= Rika Nagae =

Japanese voice actress

- 長江 里加
- Born: September 28; Saitama Prefecture, Japan
- Years active: 2015–present
- Agent: Aoni Production
- Notable work: Asobi Asobase as Olivia; Wataten! as Hinata Hoshino; Saving 80,000 Gold in Another World for My Retirement as Mitsuha Yamano

Rika Nagae (長江 里加, Nagae Rika; born September 28) is a Japanese voice actress from Saitama Prefecture who is affiliated with Aoni Production. She started her voice acting career in 2015, and in 2017 she played her first main role as Baselard in the anime series Frame Arms Girl. Her roles include Olivia in Asobi Asobase, Hinata Hoshino in Wataten!, Hayate Hisakawa in The Idolmaster Cinderella Girls Starlight Stage, and Mitsuha Yamano in Saving 80,000 Gold in Another World for My Retirement.

== Biography ==
Nagae had dreamed of appearing on TV since childhood after becoming a fan of Disney works. She also developed an interest in music, and learned to play the piano at the age of five. Although she had heard about voice acting at an early age, it was not until she was in high school when she decided to pursue it as a career.

While in high school, Nagae was a member of a band, serving as its vocalist and later its electric guitarist. She also attended a vocational school for voice acting, believing that pursuing that career would allow her to be herself.

Nagae started her voice acting career in 2015 after a period of training, and became affiliated with the talent agency Aoni Production. In 2017 she played her first main role in an anime, voicing Baselard in the television series Frame Arms Girl; she was also among the show's cast members who performed its ending theme "Fullscratch Love".

In 2018, Nagae was cast as the character Olivia in the anime series Asobi Asobase; she also performed the show's opening and ending themes together with her fellow cast members. The following year she voiced Hinata Hoshino in Wataten!; she and other cast members performed the series' opening and ending themes under the name Wataten Five. In 2019, she was cast as the character Hayate Hisakawa in The Idolmaster Cinderella Girls: Starlight Stage. She has been cast as Mitsuha Yamano in Saving 80,000 Gold in Another World for My Retirement, which premiered in 2023.

== Filmography ==
=== Television animation ===
2017

- Frame Arms Girl, Baselard

2018

- Asobi Asobase, Olivia

2019

- Wataten!, Hinata Hoshino

2022

- Aharen-san Is Indecipherable, Raido's little sister

2023

- Saving 80,000 Gold in Another World for My Retirement, Mitsuha Yamano
- Tonikawa: Over the Moon for You – High School Days, Yaiba Shirogane
- I'm Giving the Disgraced Noble Lady I Rescued a Crash Course in Naughtiness, Dorothea Gri'mm Wallenstein
- The Family Circumstances of the Irregular Witch, Anna

2024

- Hokkaido Gals Are Super Adorable!, Momoko Fuyuki
- Go! Go! Loser Ranger!, Komachi Aizome

2025

- Alma-chan Wants to Be a Family!, Makina

2026

- Keroro☆, Private Second Class Tamama

=== Original video animation (OVA) ===
2023

- Umamusume: Pretty Derby, Ines Fujin

=== Video games ===
2019

- The Idolmaster Cinderella Girls: Starlight Stage, Hayate Hisakawa

2023

- Umamusume: Pretty Derby, Ines Fujin

2025

- Groove Coaster Future Performers, Shion Seireiin
