= Win Variation =

Japanese Thoroughbred racehorse

Win Variation ウインバリアシオン
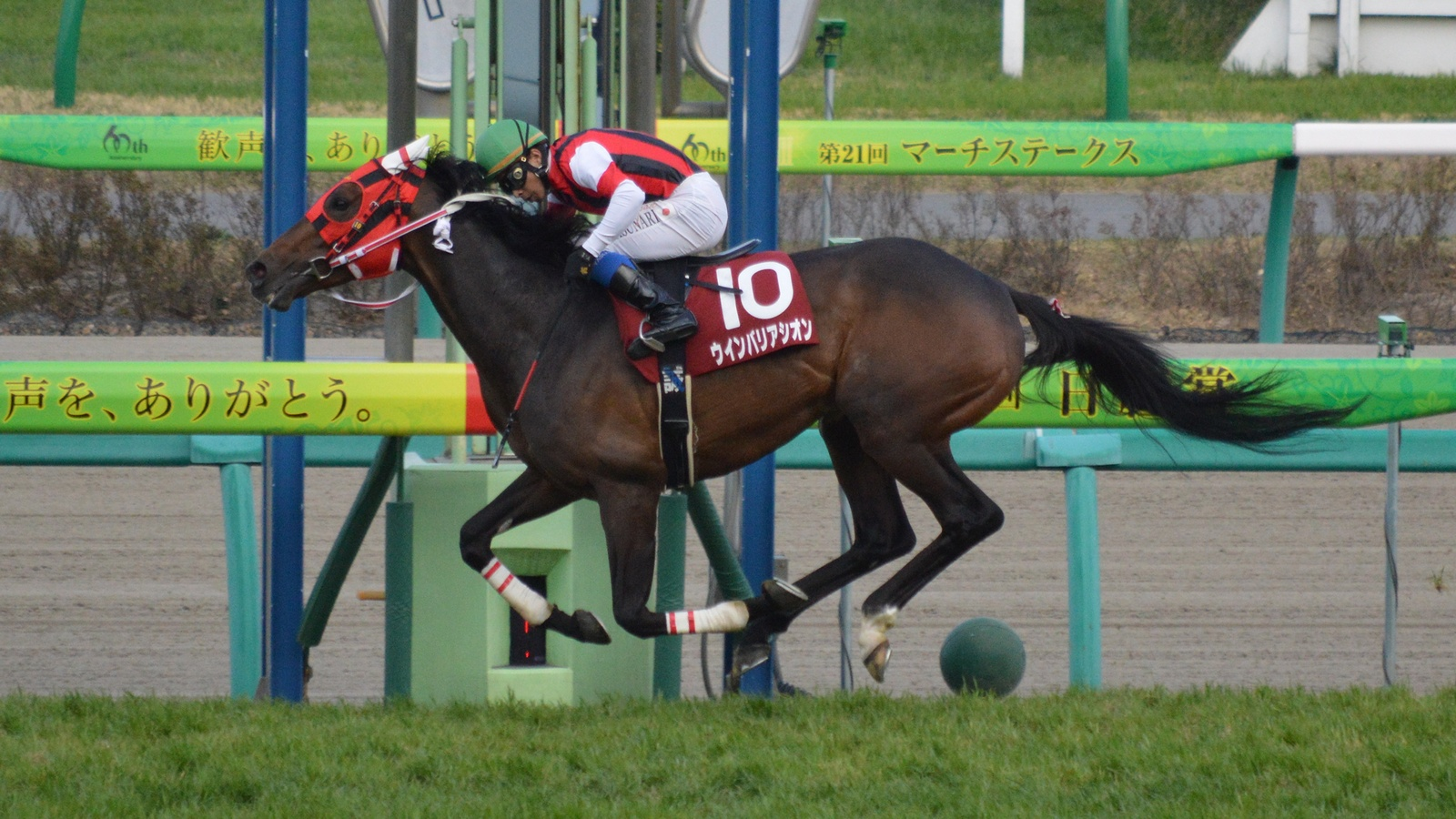
- Win Variation racing at the 2014 Nikkei Sho.
- Breed: Thoroughbred
- Sire: Heart's Cry (JPN)
- Grandsire: Sunday Silence (USA)
- Dam: Super Ballerina (JPN)
- Damsire: Storm Bird (CAN)
- Sex: Stallion
- Foaled: April 10, 2008 (age 18)
- Country: Japan
- Colour: Bay
- Breeder: Northern Farm
- Owner: Win Co., Ltd.
- Racing colours
- Trainer: Masahiro Matsunaga
- Jockey: Katsumi Ando; Yasunari Iwata
- Record: 23: 4-7-2
- Earnings: ¥579,950,000 JPY

Major wins
- Aoba Sho (2011); Nikkei Sho (2014)

Win Variation (Japanese: ウインバリアシオン, Hepburn: Uin Bariashion; foaled 10 April 2008) is a Japanese Thoroughbred racehorse and stallion. His major victories include the 2011 Aoba Sho and the 2014 Nikkei Sho. His name consists of his owner's prefix 'Win' followed by 'variation,' a solo ballet dance.

== Racing career ==
=== 2010: two-year-old season ===
Win Variation made his debut on 1 August in a maiden race over 1,800 meters on the turf at Kokura. He pulled away in the home stretch, finishing 3 lengths ahead of the runner-up to live up to his status as the favorite and win his debut race. He followed that up with a victory in the Nojigiku Stakes at Hanshin Racecourse, winning by 2½ lengths over the runner-up. However, in the Radio Nikkei Cup 2-Year-Old Stakes at the end of the year, he lacked a finishing kick in the final straight and finished fourth.

=== 2011: three-year-old season ===
In his first race of the season, the Kisaragi Sho, Win Variation finished fourth after again lacking a finishing kick in the straight, just as in his previous race. He also finished seventh in the Yayoi Sho, a trial race for the Satsuki Sho and shifted his focus to the Tokyo Yushun. Then, in the Aoba Sho, his closing kick paid off, and he claimed his first graded stakes victory, securing a priority entry into the Tokyo Yushun. In the subsequent Tokyo Yushun, he was the 10th favorite, an unusually low ranking for a trial race winner. Although he briefly took the lead in the final straight, he was overtaken by Orfèvre’s powerful surge and narrowly finished second; however, he beat third-place finisher Belshazzar by seven lengths. He began the fall season with the Kobe Shimbun Hai, moving up from the middle of the pack to a good position on the outside through the third and fourth turns, but finished second behind Orfevre. In the Kikuka Sho, he raced from the back of the field, banking on a late surge in the home stretch, but was once again beaten by Orfevre by two and a half lengths, finishing second. In the Japan Cup, his first race against older horses, he waited at the back of the pack before surging to second place at the third turn and briefly took the lead at the fourth turn, but he lacked momentum in the home stretch and finished fifth.

=== 2012: four-year-old season ===
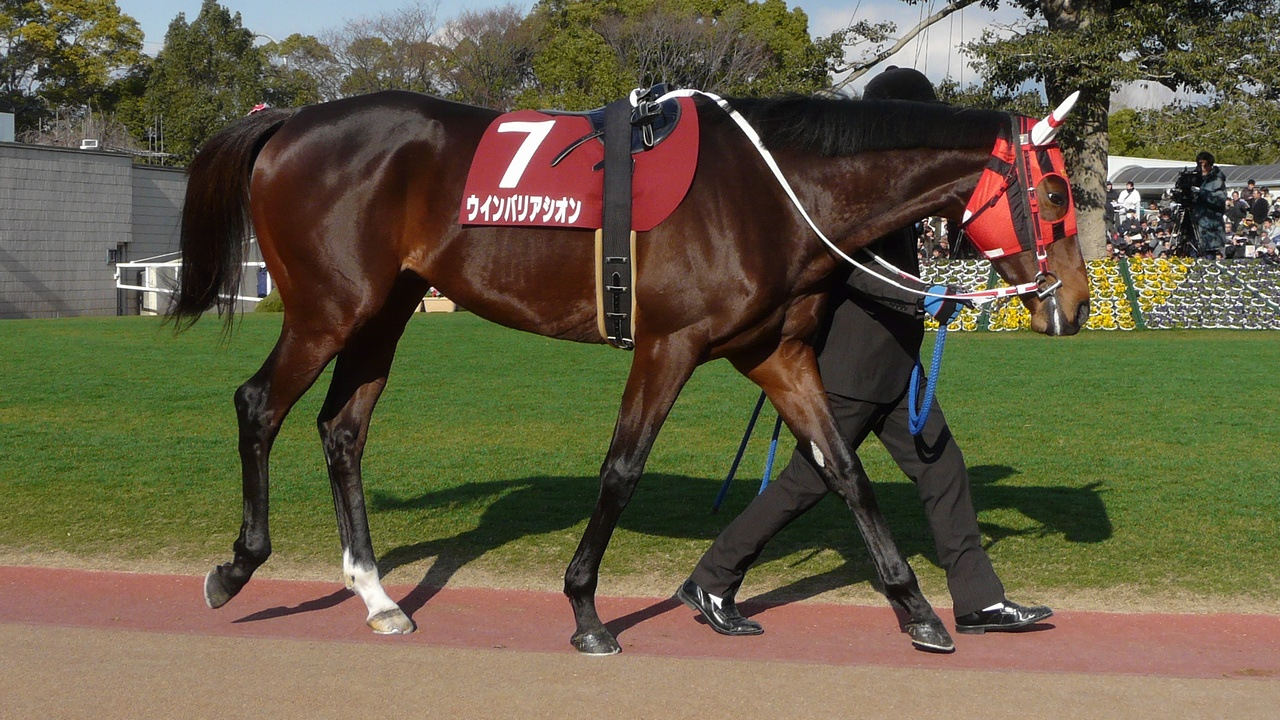
Win Variation at the 2012 Kyōto Kinen.

In his season opener, the Kyoto Kinen, Win Variation raced from the very back but lacked momentum in the home stretch and finished sixth. In the Nikkei Sho, he closed from the very back but was unable to catch the front-running Neko Punch, finishing second. In the Tenno Sho (Spring), he ran in the middle of the pack and made a late charge in the final straight but finished third behind Beat Black. This was the only race in which he finished ahead of Orfevre who finished in 11th. In the subsequent Takarazuka Kinen, he raced from the middle of the pack as in his previous start but lacked the expected finishing kick and finished fourth. He subsequently developed a mild flexor tendonitis in his left front leg and went on an extended layoff.

=== 2013: five-year-old season ===
After an extended layoff for nearly a year and a half, Win Variation made his comeback in the Kinko Sho on 30 November. Despite it being his first race in a long time, he finished third behind Karen Mirotic, demonstrating his continued ability. On December 22, he competed in the 58th Arima Kinen, putting in a valiant effort but finishing second, 8 lengths behind Orfevre, his fierce rival from his 3-year-old season.

=== 2014: six-year-old season ===
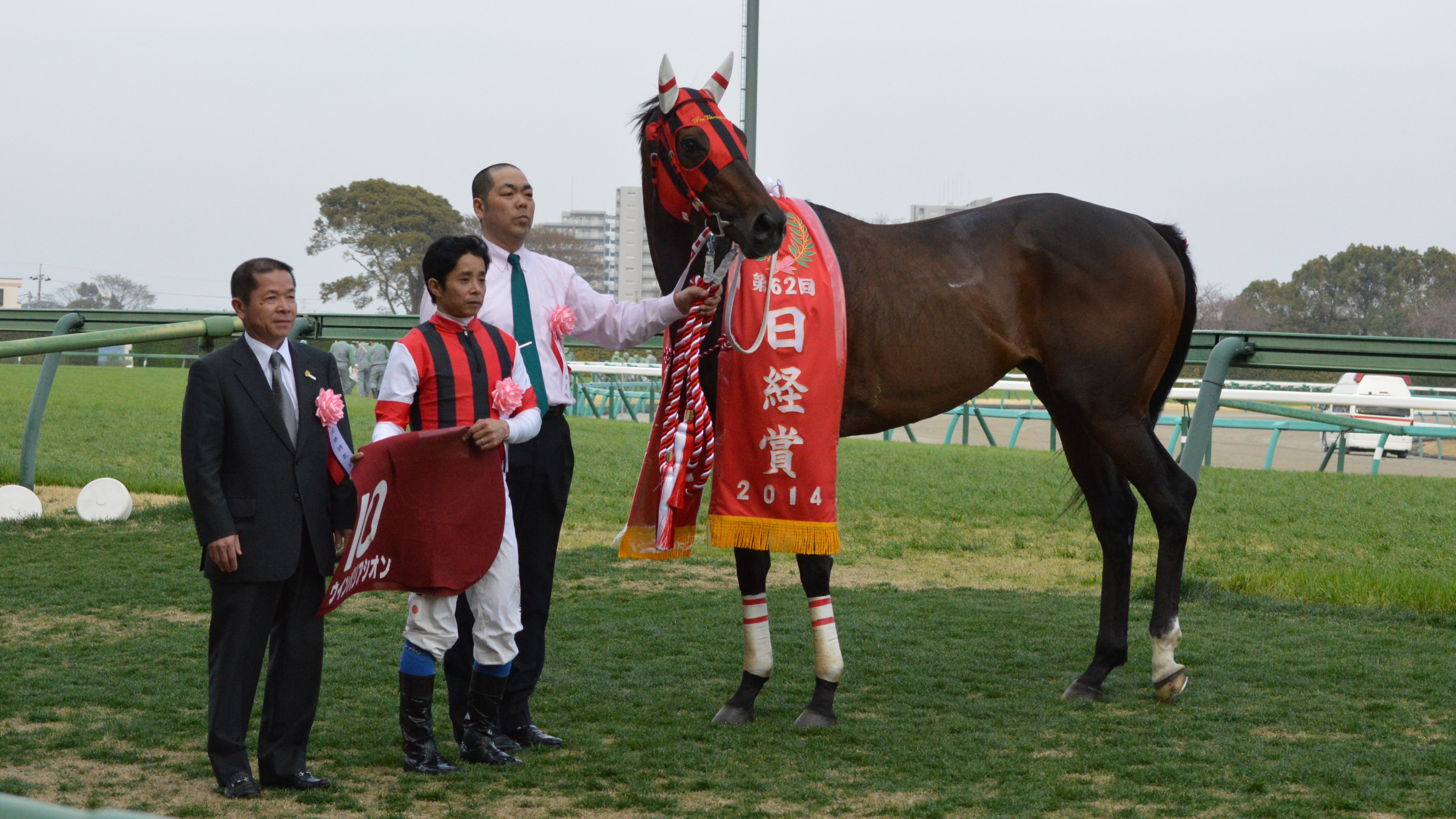
Win Variation after winning the 2014 Nikkei Sho.

In his season opener, the Nikkei Sho, while ridden by Yasunari Iwata, Win Variation secured his first victory in 1,064 days, since the 2011 Aoba Sho. Then, in the Tenno Sho (Spring), Iwata—who was originally scheduled to ride—was suspended, so the ride was supposed to go to Andrasch Starke; however, Starke was injured after being thrown from his mount in Race 5 that same day, so Koshiro Take was called in at the last minute. In the race, he made a strong run down the stretch but was unable to catch Phenomeno, who had pulled ahead earlier, and narrowly lost, finishing second for the fourth time in a Grade I race. After finishing 7th in the Takarazuka Kinen, he suffered a recurrence of flexor tendonitis in his left front leg. He finished 15th in his comeback race, the Kinko Sho, and 12th in the subsequent Arima Kinen.

=== 2015: seven-year-old season ===
Win Variation's first race of the season was the Nikkei Sho. Yuichi Fukunaga, who had last ridden him in the Yayoi Sho, was assigned to the saddle. Although he made a strong run from the inside in the home stretch, he finished second, 1 3/4 lengths behind the winner. He competed in the Tenno Sho (Spring) on May 3. He turned into the home stretch from the middle of the pack with good momentum but lost speed halfway through the stretch. He crossed the finish line in 12th place by inertia, and jockey Yuichi Fukunaga dismounted immediately afterward. Examinations revealed a partial tear of the superficial flexor tendon in his left front leg, resulting in a diagnosis that he was no longer fit to race.

According to former jockey Katsumi Ando, who rode him in six races, his gait had already been irregular since he was a 3-year-old.

== Retirement ==
Although the JRA announced that Win Variation was scheduled to become a stallion after retirement. The situation changed repeatedly with Win Variation’s official website stating that he would be used as a riding horse at Northern Farm Shigaraki. Ultimately, he became the property of Spring Farm in Towada City, Aomori Prefecture, which prevailed in negotiations against stud farms in Hokkaido, South Korea, and Australia, and was stabled at Aratani Ranch in Tohoku Town. Although he suffered from the partial tendon rupture that had caused his retirement immediately after arriving in Aomori, various treatments tried over a six-month period proved successful, and he successfully began his stud career in 2016. In his first year as a stallion, Win Variation was bred to 35 mares, with his first foal being born in February 2017.

On March 7, 2020, Dos Hearts won Race 3 at Chukyo Racecourse, marking the first victory for one of his offspring. The following year, in 2021, Barikono Yume competed in the Tulip Sho, becoming the first of his offspring to run in a graded stakes race, finishing 11th as the 10th favorite in a field of 12.

== In popular culture ==
An anthropomorphized version of Win Variation appears as a character in the Japanese multimedia franchise Umamusume: Pretty Derby, voiced by Hika Tsukishiro. She is depicted as a hardworking student and ballet dancer who dedicates herself to becoming the "principal" of racing, which is likely in reference to her namesake "variation", and her real-life dam, Super Ballerina. Like her real-life counterpart, she has a complicated rivalry with Orfevre, and feels both admiration and deep-seated resentment towards her for besting her constantly in racing.

== Racing form ==
The following form is based on information available on netkeiba.com and JBIS-Search.

Date	Age	Racecourse	Race	Grade	Distance	Gate	Odds	Fav.	Fin.	Time	Margin	Jockey	Winner (Runner-Up)
1 Aug 2010	2	Kokura	Two-Year-Old Newcomer	Maiden	T 1800m	9	3.5	1	1st	1:49.3	-0.5	Yuichi Fukunaga	(Tagano Ebene)
19 Sep 2010	2	Hanshin	Nojigiku Stakes	OP	T 1800m	7	2.8	2	1st	1:47.7	-0.4	Yuichi Fukunaga	(Meisho Naruto)
25 Dec 2010	2	Hanshin	Radio Nikkei Hai	G3	T 2000m	15	4.9	3	4th	2:02.3	0.1	Yuichi Fukunaga	Danon Ballade
6 Feb 2011	3	Kyoto	Kisaragi Sho	G3	T 1800m	9	2.8	1	4th	1:48.0	0.4	Yuichi Fukunaga	Tosen Ra
6 Mar 2011	3	Nakayama	Yayoi Sho	G2	T 2000m	7	13.3	6	7th	2:01.3	0.3	Yuichi Fukunaga	Sadamu Patek
30 Apr 2011	3	Tokyo	Aoba Sho	G2	T 2400m	4	14.5	6	1st	2:28.8	-0.1	Katsumi Ando	(Shonan Parfait)
29 May 2011	3	Tokyo	Tokyo Yushun	G1	T 2400m	1	24.4	10	2nd	2:30.8	0.3	Katsumi Ando	Orfevre
25 Sep 2011	3	Hanshin	Kobe Shimbun Hai	G2	T 2400m	5	4.5	2	2nd	2:28.7	0.4	Katsumi Ando	Orfevre
23 Oct 2011	3	Kyoto	Kikuka Sho	G1	T 3000m	13	7.8	2	2nd	3:03.2	0.4	Katsumi Ando	Orfevre
27 Nov 2011	3	Tokyo	Japan Cup	G1	T 2400m	12	14.7	7	5th	2:24.7	0.5	Katsumi Ando	Buena Vista
12 Feb 2012	4	Kyoto	Kyoto Kinen	G2	T 2200m	7	3.5	2	6th	2:13.4	1.0	Katsumi Ando	Trailblazer
24 Mar 2012	4	Nakayama	Nikkei Sho	G2	T 2500m	7	6.3	2	2nd	2:38.0	0.6	Yutaka Take	Neko Punch
29 Apr 2012	4	Kyoto	Tenno Sho (Spring)	G1	T 3200m	11	9.8	2	3rd	3:14.8	1.0	Yutaka Take	Beat Black
24 Jun 2012	4	Hanshin	Takarazuka Kinen	G1	T 2200m	1	7.9	3	4th	2:11.7	0.8	Yasunari Iwata	Orfevre
30 Nov 2013	5	Chukyo	Kinko Sho	G2	T 2000m	4	11.0	8	3rd	2:00.1	0.5	Kota Fujioka	Curren Mirotic
22 Dec 2013	5	Nakayama	Arima Kinen	G1	T 2500m	4	16.1	4	2nd	2:33.6	1.3	Yasunari Iwata	Orfevre
29 Mar 2014	6	Nakayama	Nikkei Sho	G2	T 2500m	10	2.0	1	1st	2:34.4	-0.3	Yasunari Iwata	(Hokko Brave)
4 May 2014	6	Kyoto	Tenno Sho (Spring)	G1	T 3200m	12	6.5	3	2nd	3:15.1	0.0	Koshiro Take	Fenomeno
29 Jun 2014	6	Hanshin	Takarazuka Kinen	G1	T 2200m	7	3.0	2	7th	2:14.8	0.9	Yasunari Iwata	Gold Ship
6 Dec 2014	6	Chukyo	Kinko Sho	G2	T 2000m	13	5.4	3	15th	2:00.9	2.1	Kota Fujioka	Last Impact
28 Dec 2014	6	Nakayama	Arima Kinen	G1	T 2500m	9	34.9	10	12th	2:35.9	0.6	Kota Fujioka	Gentildonna
28 Mar 2015	7	Nakayama	Nikkei Sho	G2	T 2500m	3	7.3	5	2nd	2:30.5	0.3	Yuichi Fukunaga	Admire Deus
3 May 2015	7	Kyoto	Tenno Sho (Spring)	G1	T 3200m	16	15.8	6	12th	3:15.8	1.1	Yuichi Fukunaga	Gold Ship

== Pedigree ==
Pedigree of Win Variation
Sire Heart's Cry	Sunday Silence	Halo	Hail To Reason
Sire Heart's Cry	Sunday Silence	Halo	Cosmah
Sire Heart's Cry	Sunday Silence	Wishing Well	Understanding
Sire Heart's Cry	Sunday Silence	Wishing Well	Mountain Flower
Sire Heart's Cry	Irish Dance	Tony Bin	Kampala
Sire Heart's Cry	Irish Dance	Tony Bin	Severn Bridge
Sire Heart's Cry	Irish Dance	Buper Dance	Lyphard
Sire Heart's Cry	Irish Dance	Buper Dance	My Bupers
Dam Super Ballerina	Storm Bird	Northern Dancer	Nearctic
Dam Super Ballerina	Storm Bird	Northern Dancer	Natalma
Dam Super Ballerina	Storm Bird	South Ocean	New Providence
Dam Super Ballerina	Storm Bird	South Ocean	Shining Sun
Dam Super Ballerina	Count On a Change	Time for a Change	Damascus
Dam Super Ballerina	Count On a Change	Time for a Change	Resolver
Dam Super Ballerina	Count On a Change	Count On Kathy	Dancing Count
Dam Super Ballerina	Count On a Change	Count On Kathy	War Exchange
