= Otherworldly Munchkin: Let's Speedrun the Dungeon with Only 1 HP! =

Japanese manga series

- First tankōbon volume cover

異世界マンチキン ―HP1のままで最強最速ダンジョン攻略― (Isekai Manchikin: HP 1 no Mama de Saikyō Saisoku Danjon Kōryaku)
- Genre: Comedy; Isekai
- Manga
- Written by: Yū Shimizu
- Illustrated by: Makoto Aogiri
- Published by: Kodansha
- English publisher: NA: Kodansha USA
- Imprint: Sirius KC
- Magazine: Suiyōbi no Sirius
- Original run: February 5, 2019 – present
- Volumes: 14
- Anime television series
- Directed by: Naoya Fukushi (Note: The series was originally announced in 2024 to be directed by Mamoru Yokota. In 2025, the credits were updated to list Yokota as the chief director, with Kei Yoshimizu and Naoya Fukushi as the directors. As of late 2026, the credits were further updated to only list Fukushi as the director, with Yokota and Yoshimizu's names omitted from any directing credits.)
- Written by: Hiroshi Hosokawa
- Music by: Asami Tachibana
- Studio: Durandal
- Licensed by: Crunchyroll: SEA: Muse Communication
- Original network: Tokyo MX, BS11, Nagoya TV, GTV, MBS
- Original run: January 8, 2027 – scheduled
- icon

Otherworldly Munchkin: Let's Speedrun the Dungeon with Only 1 HP! (Japanese: 異世界マンチキン ―HP1のままで最強最速ダンジョン攻略―, Hepburn: Isekai Manchikin: HP 1 no Mama de Saikyō Saisoku Danjon Kōryaku) is a Japanese manga series written by Yū Shimizu and illustrated by Makoto Aogiri. It has been serialized online via Kodansha's Niconico-based Suiyōbi no Sirius manga service since February 2019 and has been collected in fourteen tankōbon volumes. An anime television series adaptation produced by Durandal is set to premiere in January 2027.

== Plot ==
Yukito Kirihara is a high-school student who loves tabletop role-playing games. He gets reincarnated into Everworld, a fantasy world with swords and magic alongside his sister, who goes missing after being reincarnated. Yukito has a curse that makes his HP limit one, meaning that any damage can instantly kill him. Using a book he stole from the evil goddess Nephilia, he exploits loopholes in the rules of the world and other tricks to defeat his enemies. Yukito's fighting style resembles the munchkin style of pursuing optimal solutions.

== Characters ==
Yukito Kirihara (桐原ユキト, Kirihara Yukito)
Voiced by: Kazuki Ura
Charlotte R. Brownia (シャルロッテ・R・ブラウニア, Sharurotte R. Buraunia)
Voiced by: Kana Yūki
Lumilia Sherwood (ルミリア・シャーウッド, Rumiria Shāuddo)
Voiced by: Yui Ishikawa
Liverna Dark (リヴェルナ・ダーク, Riveruna Dāku)
Voiced by: Kaori Maeda
Sana Kirihara (桐原佐奈, Kirihara Sana)
Voiced by: Hika Tsukishiro
Rocinante (ロシナンテ, Roshinante)
Voiced by: Fukushi Ochiai
Managarmr (マーナガルム, Mānagarumu)
Voiced by: Ayasa Itō
Nephilia Curse (ネフィリア・カース, Nefiria Kāsu)
Voiced by: Yoko Hikasa
World Book / Narrator (世界書 / ナレーション, Sekai-sho / Narēshon)
Voiced by: Anri Katsu
Jaraza (ジャラーザ, Jarāza)
Voiced by: Yūichirō Umehara

== Media ==
=== Manga ===
Written by Yū Shimizu and illustrated by Makoto Aogiri, Otherworldly Munchkin: Let's Speedrun the Dungeon with Only 1 HP! began serialization on the Kodansha's Niconico-based Suiyōbi no Sirius manga service on February 5, 2019. Its chapters have been collected into fourteen tankōbon volumes as of May 2026. The series is licensed by Kodansha for digital-only English publication.

No.	Original release date	Original ISBN	North American release date	North American ISBN
1	September 9, 2019	978-4-06-516830-1	November 20, 2020	978-1-64-659787-1
2	April 9, 2020	978-4-06-519138-5	December 1, 2020	978-1-64-659851-9
3	October 9, 2020	978-4-06-520989-9	February 2, 2021	978-1-64-659946-2
4	May 7, 2021	978-4-06-523349-8	September 7, 2021	978-1-63-699347-8
5	November 9, 2021	978-4-06-525865-1	May 24, 2022	978-1-68-491186-8
6	May 9, 2022	978-4-06-527821-5	November 22, 2022	978-1-68-491551-4
7	November 9, 2022	978-4-06-529773-5	May 30, 2023	978-1-68-491946-8
8	May 9, 2023	978-4-06-531718-1	November 28, 2023	979-8-88-933281-7
9	November 9, 2023	978-4-06-533706-6	May 7, 2024	979-8-88-933487-3
10	May 9, 2024	978-4-06-535645-6	November 12, 2024	979-8-89-478162-4
11	November 8, 2024	978-4-06-537396-5	October 7, 2025	979-8-89-478726-8
12	June 9, 2025	978-4-06-539380-2	March 10, 2026	979-8-89-830031-9
13	November 7, 2025	978-4-06-541340-1	June 9, 2026	979-8-89-830125-5
14	May 8, 2026	978-4-06-543442-0	August 4, 2026	979-8-89-830203-0

=== Anime ===
An anime television series adaptation was announced on November 6, 2024. It is produced by Durandal and directed by Naoya Fukushi, with Hiroshi Hosokawa handling series composition, Mamoru Yokota and Yui Katō designing the characters, and Asami Tachibana composing the music. The series was originally scheduled for October 2025, but was later delayed in order to "improve the quality" of the anime series. It is set to premiere on January 8, 2027, on Tokyo MX and other networks. The opening theme song is "Sai" (サイ; lit. 'Dice'), performed by Lil League, and the ending theme song is "Zanka" (残花; lit. 'Lingering Flame'), performed by Zaq. Crunchyroll will stream the series. Muse Communication licensed the series in Southeast Asia.

== See also ==
- Bladedance of Elementalers, a light novel series written by Yū Shimizu
- The Demon Sword Master of Excalibur Academy, a light novel series written by Yū Shimizu
