= Seton Academy: Join the Pack! =

Japanese manga series

- Cover of volume 1 by Kodansha

群れなせ！シートン学園 (Murenase! Shīton Gakuen)
- Genre: Romantic comedy
- Manga
- Written by: Bungo Yamashita
- Published by: Cygames; Kodansha (distribution, 2016–2018); Shogakukan (distribution, 2019-present)
- Imprint: Cycomi, Cycomi x Ura Sunday
- Magazine: Cycomi
- Original run: May 2016 – May 2021
- Volumes: 15
- Anime television series
- Directed by: Hiroshi Ikehata
- Written by: Shigeru Murakoshi
- Music by: Yōsuke Yamashita; Yusuke Katō; Tomoya Kawasaki
- Studio: Studio Gokumi
- Licensed by: Crunchyroll; SA/SEA: Medialink
- Original network: Tokyo MX, SUN, KBS, BS11, Animax
- Original run: January 7, 2020 – March 24, 2020
- Episodes: 12 + OVA

Seton Academy: Join the Pack! (Japanese: 群れなせ！シートン学園, Hepburn: Murenase! Shīton Gakuen) is a Japanese manga series by Bungo Yamashita. It was serialized online via Cygames' Cycomi manga app and website from May 2016 to May 2021 and has been collected in fifteen tankōbon volumes by Kodansha (former) and Shogakukan (current). An anime television series adaptation by Studio Gokumi aired from January 7 to March 24, 2020.

== Synopsis ==
Seton Academy: Join the Pack takes place in a world where humans and anthropomorphic animals coexist. Female animals resemble moe girls with animal features such as kemonomimi, tails and horns, while males resemble their original species. Due to a population decline, humanoid animals now outnumber humans. The story follows Jin Mazama, a teenage human boy who attends Seton Academy as one of only two human students. Jin hates animals, but as luck would have it, he gains the attention of Ranka Ookami, a female Hokkaido wolf who dreams of forming her own pack. Jin also develops feelings for Hitomi Hino, a teenage girl and the only other human student at Seton Academy. As the story progresses, Jin must come to terms with his relationships with Ranka, Hitomi, and his thoughts on animals in general.

== Characters ==
=== Seton Academy ===
Seton Academy is the main setting of the series. All the students at Seton Academy are terrestrial (land-dwelling) animals, and the faculty is made up of extinct animals such as dinosaurs and other prehistoric creatures. The main cast is part of the academy's Cooking Club, which was started by Jin Mazama and Hitomi Hino as a way to eat properly since their school cafeteria only catered to animals. It also researches and tests recipes designed for the palates and diets of animals.

==== Cooking Club ====
Jin Mazama (間様 人, Mazama Jin)
Voiced by: Haruki Ishiya
A human boy, and one of only two humans attending Seton Academy. Jin hates animals, due to a childhood incident in which he was beaten up by three bear cubs while defending another animal (which turned out to be Ranka Ōkami). As such, he develops an intense crush on Hitomi Hino, the only other human attending his school. Early on in the series, he reunites with Ranka, who quickly becomes attached to him due to him standing up for her. Though he initially despises Ranka, even going to extreme lengths to avoid interacting with her, he eventually admits to having strong feelings for her. Despite his hate of animals in general, Jin is very knowledgeable in zoology. He also has a stubborn personality, helping Ranka and his schoolmates despite his dislike of their antics. Despite having the chance to enroll in a human school with Hitomi, Jin realizes that he is not used to being around other humans. They also miss Ranka and the other animals, resulting in them returning to Seton Academy shortly after. Jin's feelings for Ranka eventually run so deep, he opts to time-travel (over 145 times) just to ensure that Ranka stays alive, when he is stampeded by a herd of elephants in mush and Ranka dies while waiting for him to recover.
Ranka Ōkami (大狼 ランカ, Ōkami Ranka)
Voiced by: Hina Kino
A pink female Hokkaido wolf. While she considers herself a pack leader, she is its only member which often times makes her feel lonely. She is in love with Jin, treating him as the alpha male and becoming possessive and jealous when he is approached by other females. Initially, she sees Hitomi as a rival wanting to take Jin away from her, but throughout the series, they become good friends. After overhearing Jin's confession to Hitomi, Ranka opts to become the next student council president as a means to escape. Accepting Jin's unexpected opposition in the election, she and Jin challenged each other through the school tower but Jin steps down when privately admitting he is slightly attracted to her. Jin became such an important figure in Ranka's life that she would neglect her health for the sake of being with Jin, often much to his annoyance.
Hitomi Hino (牝野 瞳, Hino Hitomi)
Voiced by: Yume Miyamoto
A human girl who became friends with Jin as the few other humans at Seton. She enjoys cooking and decided to start a cooking club. Although she genuinely cares for Jin, she appears to be oblivious to his crush on her most of the time, and it isn't clear whether or not she reciprocates his feelings. She is easily embarrassed when watching Jin dealing with the animal habits of other girls. She also becomes good friends with Ranka as she genuinely cares for her too, despite their first encounter. In the future, Hitomi became a nurse tending for a patient Jin, although this is unconfirmed if it's really her personal career path once Jin's impending fate has been altered. She is implied to be bisexual, as she is seen to have feelings for both male and female students.
Yukari Komori (子守 ユカリ, Komori Yukari)
Voiced by: Misaki Kuno
A female koala who has grown tired of only eating eucalyptus and joined the Cooking Club to expand her diet. She later meets a pig who is soon to be her boyfriend. In the future, Yukari opened her p**p café company that is franchise worldwide.
Miyubi Shisho (獣生 ミユビ, Shisho Miyubi)
Voiced by: Konomi Kohara
A female three-toed sloth. Like a sloth, she moves extremely slowly and will pass out and die if she exerts herself. She has also been known to pass out (or "die") after taking a bath, eating unfamiliar foods, or walking more quickly than normal for more than a few yards. She has expressed an interest in identifying any sport she could take part in without dying and joined the Cooking Club in order to make friends. In the future, Miyubi became a vague scientist that really confuses Jin of her big vocabulary and professionalism.
Kurumi Nekomai (猫米 クルミ, Nekomai Kurumi)
Voiced by: Sora Tokui
A female cat who can elicit different feelings in others by altering the frequency of her purring. She joined the Cooking Club to make friends but is too proud to admit it. She is referred to as the club's "ghost member" as she rarely takes part in club activities but is sometimes seen around the club room and was instrumental in acquiring a steady supply of vegetables from the Gardening Club. In the future, Kurumi is suited to being a model.
Mei Mei (苺苺)
Voiced by: Yu Serizawa
A female panda who has the popularity of a celebrity. She is quite a spoiled brat who's often self-centered, haughty, and lazy. However, during her visit to the academy, she stumbled on the Cooking Club where Jin and the rest of the members were making panda dumplings. Mei Mei then snatched every piece and ate them, sparking an interest in joining the club, but of course, Jin didn't make it easy for her because of her unruly behavior. She only became a member when Kurumi gave her approval in a way that a cat does and from then on Mei Mei slowly became more cooperative, nice, but a masochist. In the future, Mei-Mei is a producer of an idol agency.
Chii Suimori (吸森 チイ, Suimori Chii)
The only vampire bat at Seton Academy who enrolled when the second-year began. Opposed to her nature, she is too scared to suck the blood out of livestock. She comes to the Cooking Club as there is salty or sour food that can satisfy her thirst, to Ranka's delight. Chii develops a natural attraction to Jin due to his unusual kindness to her. In the future, Chii runs her own drink bar compose of different types of blood. While only starring in the manga, she makes a cameo in the 11th episode of the anime.
Hana
A female Rhinograde that originally came to Seton Academy but Jin unwittingly gave her amnesia. Since her species is supposed to have existed only in fiction she lacks any sense of odor that Ranka couldn't pick up; Miyubi calls it a miracle. Nicknamed Hana, she relies on Ranka's pack to care for her. During a soccer match, Hana and her brethren of the Southern island nearly disappear from the existence that Jin predicted, but Ranka and the female cast lick her entire body to stabilize her existence. Her real name is Hoji-Hoji. In the future, Hana found her talent of being a novelist.
Rimu Urie (ウリエ リム, Urie Rimu)
A female woolly spider monkey. She acts as an advisor for the Cooking Club.

==== Students and faculty ====
Gigasu Terano (寺野 ギガス, Terano Gigasu)
Voiced by: Tesshō Genda
A male Tyrannosaurus teacher. During the Cretaceous period, when Gigasu was a student at Mesozoic Academy, he had a budding romance with a young Sameno but does not reciprocate them.
Karorisu Amano (天野 カロリス, Amano Karorisu)
Voiced by: Naoki Tatsuta
A male Anomalocaris is the headmaster of Seton Academy.
Chloe Mashima (馬縞 クロエ, Mashima Kuroe)
Voiced by: Yoshino Aoyama
A female Grévy's zebra mare who insists she is a noble species of horse and becomes embarrassed at any suggestion she is related to the donkey species. Her hobby is playing trading card games. After Ranka won the Field race, Chloe is given free space in the Cooking Club room and warms up to the others. A quagga once smitten Chloe to beat her in a game tournament until Jin exposed him.
King Shishino (獅子野 キング, Shinsino Kingu)
Voiced by: Tomokazu Sugita
A male African lion with a large harem of female lions. Despite being surrounded by females of his own species he is in love with Shiho, a female impala. As a supporter of inter-species relationships, he gets along with Jin and the members of the cooking club. A running gag includes his once impressive mane falling out whenever something goes wrong with his relationship with Shiho. King and Shiho will apparently mate and breed cubs ten years later.
Miki Hadano (肌野 ミキ, Hadano Miki)
Voiced by: Yukari Tamura
A female Naked mole-rat and Student Council President. She has an army of male naked mole-rats she considers her friends and who treat her as their queen. As a rule, she prefers being naked or partially clothed and considers having to be fully clothed at school deeply embarrassing. She is against the idea of mixed-species romance and considers it her duty to keep the students, particularly Jin, from dating outside their own species. With her presidential position expired she primarily resort to nudism again only to have gotten used to not being too revealing in public. Ten years later, Miki is the acting principal of Seton Academy.
Shiho Ihara (伊原 シホ, Ihara Shiho)
Voiced by: Marika Kōno
A female impala. She was initially unaware that King had a crush on her but after he confessed she agreed to be his friend, at least until she begins her reproductive cycle and could decide if she is romantically attracted to him.
Iena Madaraba (斑刃 イエナ, Madaraba Iena)
Voiced by: Minami Tsuda
A female spotted hyena that thinks she's a male. Even after her real gender is proven, Hitomi reassures Iena to just be the tomboyish she wants. It is hinted on multiple occasions that Iena and Hitomi have mutual feelings for each other. In the future, Iena is a martial artist.
Ferrill Ōkami (大狼 フェリル, Ōkami Feriru)
Voiced by: Asami Tano
A female Hokkaido wolf. Ferrill is Ranka's older sister and the boss of her own pack. She is 14 feet tall in size due to enduring cold climates throughout her life in the mountains.
Wolf Kuromori (黒森 ウルフ, Kuromori Urufu)
Voiced by: Junichi Yanagita
A male Eastern wolf who is a member of Ferrill's pack.
Teru Anamitsu (穴蜜 テル, Anamitsu Teru)
Voiced by: Mariko Honda
A female honey badger that tries to fight Ranka & wants to join with Ferrill. Her thick skin makes her almost invulnerable and Ferrill is one of the only characters strong enough to inflict pain on her.
Manako Kagami (鏡 マナコ, Kagami Manako)
Voiced by: Ayane Sakura
A female tarsier. Even a small amount of stress can be enough to compel her to bang her head on a hard surface in an attempt at suicide. Mei Mei makes friends with Manako.
Don Noma (野間 ドン, Noma Don)
Voiced by: Kenjiro Tsuda
A male African lion is King's rival and he's a leader of his pride.
Kuwano (桑野)
Voiced by: Kenjiro Tsuda
A male Iguanodon school doctor.

=== Sea Academy ===
Seton Academy's sister school, which is located on the coastline. Most of the students there are aquatic animals, and take their classes entirely or partially in the ocean.

Kana Shiraumi (白海 カナ, Shiraumi Kana)
Voiced by: Miho Okasaki
A female beluga whale who wants to perform in the seaside school show. She becomes a friend to Ranka and her pack.
Ruka Bando (板東 ルカ, Bando Ruka)
Voiced by: Rika Kinugawa
A female bottlenose dolphin who is the captain of the synchronized Swimming Club.
Nia Ooba (大場 ニア, Ōba Nia)
Voiced by: Kenjiro Tsuda
A male Opabinia is a headmaster of Sea Academy.

=== Darwin Academy ===
A rival school of Seton Academy. Most of its students and faculty are animals that are critically endangered or extinct.

Anne Anetani (姉谷 アン, Anetani An)
Voiced by: Sumire Uesaka
A female Neanderthal who eats very large amounts of meat as her species have twice that of modern humans' appetite. Because she has no obvious animal traits, the other characters mistake her for a human. Anne is part of Team EX that is rebellious against humans. While visiting Seton Academy, Jin mistakes her advances towards him as romance and "turns her down," to her disgrace. Anne means to interfere with Ranka's pack. After learning humans inherit 2% of neanderthal genomes, Anne makes peace with the Cooking Club and even reveals to be in love with Hitomi, much to Jin and Ranka's shock.
Man Koorimoto (氷下 マン, Kōrimoto Man)
Voiced by: Tomoko Kaneda
A female woolly mammoth. She's the boss of Team EX. Her friendship with Anne was promptly by the fact they are extinct species (because of humans theoretically). In the anime, Man's stern behavior towards humans got out of hand when she brutally beats up Ranka in a boxing match that Anne threatens to end their pact if not resolve otherwise. She and other Darwin students later have supper with the Cooking Club.
Washima Komandorski (輪島 コマンドルスキー, Washima Komandorusukī)
Voiced by: Ihara Masaaki
A male Steller sea cow that is a member of Team EX.
Babari Atlas (芭張 アトラス, Babari Atorasu)
Voiced by: Kenjiro Tsuda
A male Barbary lion that is a member of Team EX.
Ando Andrew (安藤 アンドリュー, Ando Andoryū)
Voiced by: Taiten Kusunoki
A male Andrewsarchus that is a member of Team EX.
Yangyang (揚揚, Yanyan)
Voiced by: Satomi Arai
A female Chinese river dolphin that is a member of Team EX.
Sameno Tosako (鮫野 敏子, Tosako Sameno)
A female Carcharodontosaurus teacher. For millions of years, Sameno was hopelessly waiting for Gigasu would admit his love to her. That is until Ferrill transfers and professes this in front of Sameno to her embarrassment.

== Media ==
=== Manga ===
The series is written and illustrated by Bungo Yamashita. It began serialization in Cygames's Cycomi website in May 2016.

==== Seton Academy: Join the Pack! ====
No.	Release date	ISBN
1	July 28, 2017 (Kodansha); April 30, 2020 (Shogakukan)	978-4-06-509207-1
2	September 29, 2017 (Kodansha); April 30, 2020 (Shogakukan)	978-4-06-509216-3
3	December 29, 2017 (Kodansha); April 30, 2020 (Shogakukan)	978-4-06-509229-3
4	February 28, 2018 (Kodansha); April 30, 2020 (Shogakukan)	978-4-06-509250-7
5	June 29, 2018 (Kodansha); April 30, 2020 (Shogakukan)	978-4-06-511871-9
6	November 30, 2018 (Kodansha); April 30, 2020 (Shogakukan)	978-4-06-513675-1

==== Murenase! Seton Gakuen -Animal Academy- ====
No.	Release date	ISBN
1	August 30, 2019	—
2	January 30, 2020	—
3	February 28, 2020	—
4	March 30, 2020	—
5	June 30, 2020	—
6	August 28, 2020	—
7	November 30, 2020	—
8	January 29, 2021	—
9	June 30, 2021	—

=== Anime ===
On October 4, 2019, an anime television series adaptation was announced by Cygames. The series was animated by Studio Gokumi and directed by Hiroshi Ikehata, with Shigeru Murakoshi handling series composition, and Masakatsu Sasaki designing the characters. Yōsuke Yamashita, Yusuke Katō, and Tomoya Kawasaki composed the series' music. It aired from January 7 to March 24, 2020, on Tokyo MX, SUN, KBS, BS11, and Animax. (Note: Tokyo MX lists the show at 24:30 on January 6, which is at 12:30 A.M. on January 7, 2020.) Crunchyroll streamed the series outside Asian territories. In Southeast Asia and South Asia, Medialink streamed the series on its Ani-One YouTube channel. It ran for 12 episodes, with an unaired episode to be bundled with the series' third Blu-ray volume. The series' opening theme is Gakuen Sōkan Zoo (学園壮観Zoo) by Hina Kino, Haruki Ishiya, Yume Miyamoto, Misaki Kuno, Konomi Kohara, and Sora Tokui as their respective characters, and the ending theme is "Ōkami Blues" (オオカミブルース) by Kino under her character name Ranka Ōkami.

No.	Title (Note: All English titles are taken from Crunchyroll.)	Original release date
1	"Ranka the Wolf Boss"; Transliteration: "Ookami bosu Ranka" (Japanese: おおかみ親分(ボス)ランカ)	January 7, 2020
In an alternate world of humanoid animals, the human population has declined drastically. Jin Mazama, a human, attends Seton Academy and meets Ranka Okami, a short-tempered wolf-girl who immediately develops a crush on him. To calm her down he feeds her meat, only to be invited to join her pack. Jin meets Hino Hitomi, one of the few other humans at Seton, and instantly falls in love with her, though he initially remains oblivious to Ranka's crush on him. Sensing a rival, a jealous Ranka challenges Hitomi for Jin's love, causing her to run away. Jin points out other students normally form packs with their own species. Ranka denies this as a human once beat up bear cubs bullying her. Jin realizes it was him who tried to save Ranka, but the bears beat him up, causing his hatred of animals. Ranka becomes upset when Jin forms a pack, (Cooking Club), with Hitomi. Jin later sees Ranka being used as a servant by Mashima Kuroe, a zebra-girl. Jin defeats Kuroe by revealing that zebras more closely resemble donkeys than horses, and exposes Kuroe's donkey-like tail, and panties. Hitomi invites Ranka to join the cooking club before being attacked by three bear-boys who plan to eat Hitomi. Ranka tries to fight back, allowing Hitomi to escape before Jin neutralizes them with bear spray, but they recover by washing their eyes with water. They almost kill Jin but are chased away by the giant teacher Gigasu Terano, a T-rex man. To thank her, Jin and Hitomi agree to join Ranka's pack, only for her to accept by grossly licking them both on the mouth like a wolf.
2	"Why Females Put XXX in Their Mouths"; Transliteration: "Naze Mesu-tachi wa ￮￮￮ wo Kuchi ni suru ka" (Japanese: なぜ雌達は○○○を口にするか)	January 14, 2020
Jin announces Ranka must pass a cooking test. Komori Yukari, a koala-girl also asks to join. Yukari only eats Eucalyptus but believes she once ate something else. Annoyed, Jin allows Ranka to cook a vile dish that Yukari must eat to earn membership. The vile dish makes Yukari realize the something else she once ate was undigested eucalyptus from her mother's digestive system, part of a baby koala's diet. Kurumi Nekomai, a cat-girl, uses hypnotic purring to manipulate her way into the club, though Jin is unaffected. The gardening club, a sounder of boar-boys, are convinced by Kurumi to supply them with vegetables. Kurumi tries to get everyone to quit the cooking club and start a sleeping club but fails, so she quits. Ranka suggests inviting Miyubi Shisho, a sloth-girl. The teacher Aramoto, a gigantic Alamosaurus-man, threatens them into being Miyubi's friends, as her slow movements require a lot of assistance. Ranka tries to help Miyubi take a bath, requiring Jin to save her as sloths easily overheat. After an awkward shower, Miyubi thanks Jin for letting her join the club. Jin, who had been planning on refusing, lets her join out of guilt. He also lets Kurumi join as he knows she really wants to be friends, based on her feline attention-seeking behavior. The cooking club's inter-species friendships draw the attention of the student council who decide the cooking club must be shut down.
3	"Those Who Strip with the Ones They Love"; Transliteration: "Aisuru mono tachi to nugu mono" (Japanese: 愛するものたちと脱ぐもの)	January 21, 2020
Student council president Miki Hadano warns the students to avoid unnatural inter-species relationships. In her office, she strips to her bra and panties, revealing she is a naked mole rat-girl with an army of male naked mole rats. Miki concludes Jin is trying to assemble a multi-species harem and sends her army to spy on him. Jin is kidnapped by the lion-girl harem of lion-boy King Shishino. King admits he has fallen in love with Shiho, an impala-girl, and asks Jin's advice on inter-species relationships. Jin discovers King has never spoken to Shiho and suggests King speak to her in person. Unfortunately, Shiho runs away whenever King approaches. A group of male lions suddenly challenge King for his harem, revealing they have taken Shiho hostage. King proves his dominance by beating them all and then surprises everyone by cutting off his impressive black mane, causing his harem to lose interest in him. He manages to confess his feelings to Shiho, but while she turns him down as she is not in heat, she is willing to be friends until she is ready. This convinces Miki that Jin is manipulating students into forming inter-species couples and confronts him in her underwear. She demands the club shut down, but when Ranka saves the mole rats from being eaten by Kurumi, they convince Miki there is nothing unnatural about just being friends with another species. Miki decides to leave but will continue watching Jin very closely.
4	"The Self-Styled Young Man and the Giant Wolf"; Transliteration: "Jishō shōnen to Dai ōkami" (Japanese: 自称少年と大狼)	January 28, 2020
With King cutting his mane, his throne becomes available and the school's males begin fighting amongst themselves. Ranka's older sister, Ferrill Okami, arrives at Seton but is nervous about seeing Ranka. She visits the cooking club where, after a happy reunion, she asks Ranka to return to their pack. Ranka refuses, claiming she is Jin's wife, so Ferrill decides to make Jin a pack member, until Ranka claims she hates Ferrill, defeating her. Shiho temporarily breaks up with King to focus on club activities. Ferrill is challenged by a hyena-girl named Iena Madaraba, but she ignores her. Meanwhile, several lion-boys hear that Jin defeated Ferrill, and decide to defeat him themselves. However, Iena defeats the lions, wanting to fight Jin herself, until Jin points out she is actually female, and she storms off. The next day, Iena decides to prove to Jin she is male. The naked mole-rats tell Miki that Iena is causing trouble and show her a video of Jin pulling down Iena's pants, causing Miki to faint. Meanwhile, it is shown Iena is actually trying to pull her own pants down while Jin is trying to stop her. Jin reveals that female hyenas possess a fake penis similar to the males, causing Iena to realize she actually is female. Ferrill decides she is happy Ranka formed her own pack, though she still hates Jin. Meanwhile, Iena tells her family she has accepted being a female, but after their embarrassingly enthusiastic response, she angrily goes back to calling herself, male.
5	"Who was Brave?"; Transliteration: "Dare ka yūkan deatta ka?" (Japanese: 誰が勇敢であったか？)	February 4, 2020
Field Day is approaching and Ranka wants the cooking club to compete, but everyone except Miyubi refuses. Ranka and Miyubi begin training while helping the naked mole rats construct the sports field. Seeing their determination, Hitomi and Jin decide to compete. Kuroe, now friends with the donkeys, challenges them until Yukari points out they don't have enough team members to compete. Miyubi arrives somehow able to run, only it turns out she has a cold and her increased heart rate made her faster temporarily. The cooking club loses all the morning events, unable to compete with other species, especially the cheating Chimpanzee leader, Pan Saruhama, who is able to use tools. In the afternoon, Jin lets the donkeys join their team and they easily win a footrace over a snowy mountain while Yukari surprisingly wins the arm wrestling against the gorilla-boys. Jin wins the endurance race as humans have the most stamina of any mammal. Hitomi is drugged by the chimpanzees before she can compete in the swimming, so Miyubi takes her place as sloths can swim. Miyubi takes the lead until Pan uses a boat to almost drown her. The whole crowd begins cheering for Miyubi and she manages to finish the race before dying. Ranka runs the last race through a jungle and wins after teaching Pan a lesson. Cooking club comes in the first place and wins Field Day, deciding to let the donkeys use their club room as thanks for helping.
6	"The Legend of the Panda Girl"; Transliteration: "Onna Kumaneko no Denki" (Japanese: 女熊猫の伝記)	February 11, 2020
A panda-girl named Mei Mei transfers to Seton with her manager, a red panda-man named Feng Feng. Mei Mei turns out to be a brat, having been spoiled her whole life due to her species rarity. Mei Mei disguises herself using hair stolen from King's newly regrown mane and visits the cooking club, rudely eats all the dumplings Jin made, then reveals she is the new panda student. However, Jin is unimpressed and throws her out. Having never been treated that way before she becomes embarrassed and confused. She bribes Yukari, Miyubi, and Ranka to let her join, however, Jin still treats her like a brat by insisting she cook and clean for herself. Mei Mei finds herself secretly enjoying Jin's treatment of her. Jin decides she needs the permission of all the club members, including Kurumi, who like a cat reacts negatively to strangers. To make Kurumi comfortable Jin locks Mei Mei in a cage, which she also secretly enjoys, and Mei Mei stubbornly insists on staying until Kurumi accepts her. Kurumi, meanwhile, decides to accept her. When Mei Mei wakes up, she finds out she has been given a blanket. Ranka explains Mei Mei must lick the pack leader's mouth to join the pack, so Mei Mei licks Jin, having confused him as the dominant male, then gets mad when her mistake is explained. All the girls go to Seton's hot spring, which Jin built, and it is revealed it was actually Jin who gave Mei Mei the blanket. Meanwhile, the newly shaven King becomes jealous after seeing Shiho with an impala-boy.
7	"The Wild Habits of a Troubled Animal"; Transliteration: "Nayami Shi-kemono no Yasei-teki Shūkan" (Japanese: 悩みし獣の野性的習慣)	February 18, 2020
Iena has no idea how to act female and decides to learn by stalking Hitomi. Teru Anamitsu, a tiny honey badger-girl wants to join Ferrill's pack but is rejected as the only female Ferrill will accept is Ranka. Teru decides to defeat Ranka to prove herself. Iena tries to copy Hitomi but ends up seeming even manlier. Hitomi takes her to the cooking club where Jin criticizes everything about her. Yukari suggests Hitomi act like Iena, but somehow it comes across as very stimulating. Teru demands Ranka fight her and is thrown out by Iena but appears uninjured. Iena temporarily becomes feminine but reverts to her old self after being embarrassed by her unfeminine digestive process. Teru tries to fight Ranka again but the lion-boys begin bullying her, only to find her honey badger skin makes her impervious to injury. Iena returns to her tomboy self and defeats the lions. Ranka refuses to fight so Iena challenges Teru instead. Teru uses the stink gas produced by her body, accidentally defeating Ranka. Ferrill beats up Teru for hurting Ranka and Teru decides she likes it after feeling pain for the first time. Ranka is happy Ferrill has invited a non-wolf into her pack so Ferrill lets Teru stay to keep Ranka happy. Iena proves happier as her old self while her new closeness to Hitomi almost makes Jin fight her for dominance. Meanwhile, King protects Shiho from bullying warthog-boys and she admits she loves him. King mistakes this for an invitation-only to be kicked in the face as Shiho is still not in heat.
8	"The Beach Bard"; Transliteration: "Umi no Gin'yū shijin" (Japanese: 海の吟遊詩人)	February 25, 2020
Jin's class is sent on a trip to Seton's Sea Academy. Shiraumi Kana, a Beluga whale-girl, fails to put on an impressive welcome show and flees. Ranka and Mei Mei learn Kana wants to join the schools' idols, a pod of dolphin-girls. Bando Ruka, the dolphin's leader, denied Kana entry to the swimming club as Belugas are slower than dolphins. Jin tells Kana to form a singing show, as Belugas are excellent vocalists. Unfortunately, Kana is a terrible singer. Jin is approached by Ruka who, due to the dolphin's unusual sleep patterns, alternately begs tearfully then forcefully demands Jin convince Kana to quit as a mixed species show is impossible. Jin is scared by a giraffe-boy who is romantically interested in him. Like Ruka, Kana is worried separate species can't swim together, but Ranka is confident Jin's singing idea will work since he got the cooking club girls to work together. Feeling guilty, Jin points out Kana has been trying to sing with her mouth, but Belugas actually sing using a special nasal cavity on top of their heads. Kana and the cooking club put on a show and Kana manages to sing a beautiful song that resonates with the nasal cavity in Ruka's head, causing her to realize the emotional side of her brain wants to help Kana even more. She and the other dolphins join the show with Kana leading them. The show is a success and Kana is invited to join the swimming club. Later, Jin almost has a chance to confess to Hitomi but is interrupted by the giraffe-boy.
9	"Legends of Animal Ecology"; Transliteration: "Dōbutsu seitai-den" (Japanese: 動物生態伝)	March 3, 2020
Mei Mei meets a nervous tarsier-girl named Manako Kagami who tries to commit suicide. Jin says this is normal for tarsiers since their species commit suicide when stressed. Mei Mei eventually befriends Manako who becomes so happy she tries suicide again but is stopped by Miyubi, who tells her to defeat her instincts. Shiho tells King she is finally in the heat but insists he meet her parents. Miki considers retiring as council president. A typhoon floods the school's underground, requiring the tunnel dwelling species to share bedrooms with those above ground. Hina's new roommate is Hoshino Hana, a mole-girl, while Miki turns Jin's room into her office. She asks if he wants to replace her as he can cooperate with multiple species, but reconsiders after hearing his evil plans to get rid of the animals. Jin points out Miki works with more species, meaning she also forms inter-species friendships. Realizing he is right Miki becomes so happy she strips off everything, including underwear, just as the cooking club arrives. Miki clears up the misunderstanding with the girls, who all strip to their underwear to make Miki more comfortable (without Jin present). A new predator girl arrives at Seton and immediately senses the presence of a human. Shiho's parents decide to trust King, but only if he takes part in an Impala Tournament.
10	"A Gentle Savage"; Transliteration: "Ichi nin no Onwana yabanjin" (Japanese: 一人の穏和な野蛮人)	March 10, 2020
The new girl, Anne Anetani, visits the cooking club and witnesses Jin saving Ranka, who is in her reproductive cycle, driving all the canine males crazy with lust. Anne beats up all the dogs with a stone spear. The cooking club believes Anne is human and Hitomi is happy to be with another human. Jin hides Ranka in his room, only to realize that being in heat means Ranka is also crazy with lust, so she pounces on him. Jin rejects Ranka, claiming he hates her, making her cry. Anne later tells Jin she is interested in him, which he interprets as a confession, and rejects her, infuriating her. While spending time with Hitomi, Anne faints from hunger, so Hitomi feeds her large amounts of meat. A depressed Ranka finishes her heat cycle and tells Anne she is having problems with her human boyfriend. Anne advises she dump him as humans have caused many species to go extinct. Ranka decides to confront Jin while Anne hopes they argue and the pack falls apart. Ranka confronts Jin and he admits humans are cruel liars, meaning he was lying about hating her. With the cooking club back to normal Anne angrily returns to her original school, Darwin Academy, and her team the Extinct Species Alliance, or Team EX, made up of several supposedly extinct species, who seek the complete destruction of the human race. Anne assures them she can drive the humans extinct. Meanwhile, King competes in the Impala Tournament and defeats Shiho's father, who is convinced that King is a worthy son-in-law, however, both he and Shiho's mother knock King out after learning he plans on mating with Shiho as soon as possible.
11	"Extinct Species and a Primitive Plot"; Transliteration: "Zetsumetsushu to genshi teki bōryaku" (Japanese: 絶滅種と原始的謀略)	March 17, 2020
As the school festival begins, Anne returns to Seton and helps the cooking club serve food to everyone. Iena helps as well and she and Anne instantly dislike each other as they both have feelings for Hitomi. The rest of Team EX arrives at the festival: Babari Atlas the Barbary lion-boy, Yangyang the Chinese river dolphin-girl, Washima Komandorski the Steller's sea cow-boy, and Ando Andrew the Andrewsarchus-boy, with the goal of wiping out humanity. Anne senses her team has arrived and not wanting Hitomi to be hurt, knocks her out and tries to carry her away, but Iena intercepts and fights her. Washima is distracted by the festival's games. Ando mistakes Teru for a human and attacks her, only to get beaten up by Ferrill. Yangyang is served a meal by Yukari and enjoys it, only to be horrified when Yukari says it is made of rabbit droppings. Babari captures Jin and nearly kills him, but King and Shiho rescue him. Babari mocks King's love for Shiho and slaps her, but King defeats him after Jin distracts him by pointing out Barbary lions are not actually extinct. After interrogating Babari, they realize Hitomi is in danger and look for her. Anne tells Iena that she seeks revenge on humanity for driving her species to extinction, but Iena destroys her spear. Ranka arrives and convinces Anne to stand down by sniffing her and being able to tell she regrets her actions, then having faith in her to do the right thing. Afterward, a Woolly mammoth whom Anne identifies as the boss of Team Ex berates Anne for going soft and appears with earth-shaking steps.
12	"The Animal Students I Know"; Transliteration: "Ore no shiru gakusei dōbutsu" (Japanese: オレの知る学生動物)	March 24, 2020
As Jin, King, and Shiho arrive, Jin realizes that Anne is a Neanderthal, not a human. The huge woolly mammoth was an illusion and the real boss of Team EX is Koorimoto Man, a tiny mammoth-girl. Despite her size, she is incredibly strong and effortlessly beats up King and Iena. Jin temporarily neutralizes her by spilling Shiho's bag of marbles (elephants avoid stepping on small objects), then proposes Koorimoto face Ranka in a boxing match. Koorimoto accepts, keeping Hitomi as a hostage and offering to release her if she loses, but being allowed to get revenge on Jin and Hitomi if she wins. Ferrill offers to take Ranka's place, but Ranka is determined. Anne remembers Koorimoto uniting Team EX to get revenge on humanity for driving them to extinction, but is conflicted when Hitomi says she still considers them friends even though she isn't human. With Kuroe as the referee, Ranka tries avoiding Koorimoto's punches to tire her out, but any blow Koorimoto does land causes serious damage due to her immense strength. In between rounds, Anne tries to convince Koorimoto that humans are not as evil as they thought, but she refuses to listen. Ranka gets knocked out of the ring but beats the 10-count. Jin gives Ranka encouragement, cheering her up and restoring her energy, while Anne tells Koorimoto that they are no longer friends, depressing her. Ranka knocks Koorimoto out and wins. Washima tries to attack them, but slips on the marbles and knocks himself out. Afterward, Team EX makes amends with everybody and cooks a meal with the cooking club. As Team EX leaves, Anne gets annoyed when Iena interrupts her talk with Hitomi. Later, the cooking club finds King beaten up and he says Seton Academy is under attack by the giant insect students of Fabre Academy.
OVA	"Hot Spring Conference of Animal Girls"; Transliteration: "Dōbutsu no on'nanoko no onsen kaigi" (Japanese: 動物の女の子の温泉会議)	July 3, 2020
After Seton Academy battled Fabre Academy off-screen, the female members of the cooking club, Iena, Anne, Koorimoto, and Yangyang relax in the hot spring. Iena gets increasingly jealous at how close Hitomi is getting with Anne and Koorimoto. Yukari seduces Yangyang and gets her to admit she enjoyed eating poop. Hitomi says Jin mentioned humans and Neanderthals are close enough to interbreed, causing Anne to beg Hitomi to mate with her. The thought of mating with Hitomi arouses Iena and her pseudo penis gets an erection. Enraged, Anne attacks Iena with her spear. Koorimoto admits that she has also fallen in love with Hitomi and declares that she will claim her, causing Ranka to attack her to defend Hitomi and the rest of her pack. Hitomi screams at them to stop fighting, causing them to stop and apologize, but then Anne and Iena continue to argue, much to Hitomi's frustration.

== Reception ==
Both the manga and the anime received mixed reviews from critics, with the writing, lore and characterizations receiving criticism.
