= Zatsu Tabi: That's Journey =

Japanese manga series

- First tankōbon volume cover, featuring Chika Suzugamori

ざつ旅 -That's Journey-
- Genre: Adventure
- Manga
- Written by: Kenta Ishizaka
- Published by: ASCII Media Works
- English publisher: Kadokawa (digital)
- Imprint: Dengeki Comics Next
- Magazine: Dengeki Maoh
- Original run: March 27, 2019 – present
- Volumes: 15
- Manga

Zatsu Tabi: Another Side View – Hasunuma Koyomi no Nichijō
- Written by: Kenta Ishizaka
- Illustrated by: Meidosuki
- Published by: ASCII Media Works
- Imprint: Dengeki Comics Next
- Magazine: Dengeki Maoh
- Original run: October 27, 2023 – October 27, 2025
- Volumes: 2
- Anime television series
- Directed by: Masaharu Watanabe
- Written by: Yoshiko Nakamura
- Music by: Yoshiaki Fujisawa
- Studio: Makaria (Note: Animation production assistance (アニメーション制作協力) for all episodes provided by Luminas.)
- Licensed by: Crunchyroll
- Original network: AT-X, Tokyo MX, BS11, ytv, GYT, TUF, NST, TBC, RAB, CBC TV, BBT, IBC, TSK, RCC, TSC
- Original run: April 7, 2025 – June 23, 2025
- Episodes: 12
- icon

Zatsu Tabi: That's Journey (ざつ旅 -That's Journey-) is a Japanese manga series written and illustrated by Kenta Ishizaka. It has been serialized in ASCII Media Works' seinen manga magazine Dengeki Maoh since March 2019, with its chapters collected into fifteen tankōbon volumes as of June 2026. An anime television series adaptation produced by Makaria aired from April to June 2025.

== Plot ==
Chika Suzugamori, a college student who dreams of becoming a mangaka, tells her story. After failing multiple times to get her work serialized, Chika feels stressed and decides to go on a trip to escape. Without much planning, she holds a poll on social media to choose her destinations, leading her to unexpected places across Japan. During her journey, Chika meets different people, experiences local cultures, and finds new inspiration for her manga.

== Characters ==
Chika Suzugamori (鈴ヶ森 ちか, Suzugamori Chika)
Voiced by: Hika Tsukishiro
Koyomi Hasunuma (蓮沼 暦, Hasunuma Koyomi)
Voiced by: Sayumi Suzushiro
Yui Unoki (鵜木 ゆい, Unoki Yui)
Voiced by: Sae Hiratsuka
Fuyune Kōjiya (糀谷 冬音, Kōjiya Fuyune)
Voiced by: Satomi Satō
Riri Tenkūbashi (天空橋 りり, Tenkūbashi Riri)
Voiced by: Yoko Hikasa
Yoshimoto (吉本)
Voiced by: Yū Kobayashi

== Media ==
=== Manga ===
Written and illustrated by Kenta Ishizaka, Zatsu Tabi: That's Journey began serialization in ASCII Media Works' Dengeki Maoh magazine on March 27, 2019. As of June 2026, fifteen tankōbon volumes have been released. In June 2025, Kadokawa announced that it would digitally publish the series in English on the BookWalker Global service starting on June 7.

A spin-off series illustrated by Meidosuki, titled Zatsu Tabi: Another Side View – Hasunuma Koyomi no Nichijō (ざつ旅 -Another Side View- 蓮沼暦の日常; lit. 'Zatsu Tabi: Another Side View – Koyomi Hasanuma's Daily Life'), was serialized in Dengeki Maoh from October 27, 2023, to October 27, 2025. Two tankōbon volumes were released on December 27, 2024, and December 27, 2025.

==== Volumes ====
===== Zatsu Tabi: That's Journey =====
No.	Japanese release date	Japanese ISBN
1	September 27, 2019	978-4-04-912825-3
2	February 10, 2020	978-4-04-913045-4
3	July 27, 2020	978-4-04-913299-1
4	December 26, 2020	978-4-04-913591-6
5	May 27, 2021	978-4-04-913802-3
6	December 25, 2021	978-4-04-914120-7
7	May 27, 2022	978-4-04-914430-7
8	December 26, 2022	978-4-04-914710-0
9	May 26, 2023	978-4-04-915016-2
10	December 27, 2023	978-4-04-915380-4
11	June 26, 2024	978-4-04-915797-0
12	December 27, 2024	978-4-04-916178-6
13	June 27, 2025	978-4-04-916528-9
14	December 27, 2025	978-4-04-916867-9
15	June 26, 2026	978-4-04-952278-5

===== Zatsu Tabi: Another Side View – Hasunuma Koyomi no Nichijō =====
No.	Japanese release date	Japanese ISBN
1	December 27, 2024	978-4-04-916179-3
2	December 27, 2025	978-4-04-916866-2

=== Anime ===
An anime adaptation was announced in the July issue of Dengeki Maoh on May 26, 2023. It was later revealed to be a television series produced by Makaria and directed by Masaharu Watanabe, with Yoshiko Nakamura supervising the scripts, Rere designing the characters, and Yoshiaki Fujisawa composing the music. Hitoshi Kubota served as the narrator. The series aired from April 7 to June 23, 2025, on AT-X and other networks. The opening theme song is "Tabi Shiyo! Don't You?" (旅しよ！don't you？; Let's Go on a Trip! Don't You?), performed by Harmoe, and the ending theme song is "Bookmarks", performed by Sizuk. Crunchyroll is streaming the series.

==== Episodes ====
No.	Title	Directed by	Written by	Storyboarded by	Original release date
1	"The First 1,225 Steps"; Transliteration: "Hajime no Ichi-sen Ni-hyaku Ni-jū-go Dan" (Japanese: はじめの1225段)	Masaharu Watanabe	Yoshiko Nakamura	Masaharu Watanabe	April 7, 2025
2	"The Real Deal! A Lively Journey for Two"; Transliteration: "Date ja Nai! Kitokito Futari Tabi" (Japanese: 伊達じゃない！ きときとふたり旅)	Yuri Hagiwara	Yoshiko Nakamura	Hidekazu Hara	April 14, 2025
3	"Perfect the Way It Is"; Transliteration: "Sono Mama no Koshi de" (Japanese: そのままのコシで)	Susumu Yamamoto	Yoshiko Nakamura	Masaharu Watanabe	April 21, 2025
4	"Smile by the Sea"; Transliteration: "Fu, Bai za Shī" (Japanese: ふ、ばいざしー)	Daisuke Kurose	Masahiro Yokotani	Masaharu Watanabe	April 28, 2025
5	"Crows, Dragons, Soba, and a Remote Island"; Transliteration: "Karasu to Ryū to Soba to Ritō" (Japanese: カラスと龍と蕎麦と離島)	Norikazu Ishigooka	Yoshiko Nakamura	Masaharu Watanabe	May 5, 2025
6	"An Epic Midsummer Journey!"; Transliteration: "Manatsu no Daibōken Tabi!" (Japanese: 真夏の大冒険旅！)	Susumu Yamamoto & Masaharu Watanabe	Yoshiko Nakamura	Hidekazu Hara & Masaharu Watanabe	May 12, 2025
7	"A City Where You Can Meet Gods? And Then..."; Transliteration: "Kamisama to Deaeru Machi? Soshite..." (Japanese: 神様と出会える街？ そして...)	Susumu Yamamoto	Masahiro Yokotani	Namako Umino & Yōsuke Yamamoto	May 19, 2025
8	"Three Girls, Cozy and Full of Laughs"; Transliteration: "Joshi Sannin Yotte Mutsumajii" (Japanese: 女子三人寄って睦まじい)	Gakuto Ikete	Masahiro Yokotani	Masaharu Watanabe	May 26, 2025
9	"Completion at the Hot Spring, Then the First Sunrise"; Transliteration: "Onsen de Kansei Shite, Hatsuhinode" (Japanese: 温泉で完成して、初日の出)	Taika Miyagi	Yoshiko Nakamura	Namako Umino & Ryūtarō Awabe	June 2, 2025
10	"Home in My Heart"; Transliteration: "Kokoro no Furusato" (Japanese: ココロのふるさと)	Norikazu Ishigooka	Yoshiko Nakamura	Ryūtarō Awabe & Hinako Masaki	June 9, 2025
11	"A Pilgrimage with Master"; Transliteration: "Shishō to Katamairi" (Japanese: 師匠と片参り)	Susumu Yamamoto	Yoshiko Nakamura	Daisuke Kurose	June 16, 2025
12	"That's Journey" (Note: The episode title is listed as "Tabi wa Zatsu de Ii, Zatsu ga Ii" (旅はざつでいい、ざつがいい) on the official website.)	Masaharu Watanabe	Yoshiko Nakamura	Masaharu Watanabe	June 23, 2025

== Reception ==
The series was nominated for Best Printed Manga at the Next Manga Awards for 2020 and 2021.
