= Hina Kino =

Japanese voice actress (born 1997)

- 木野 日菜
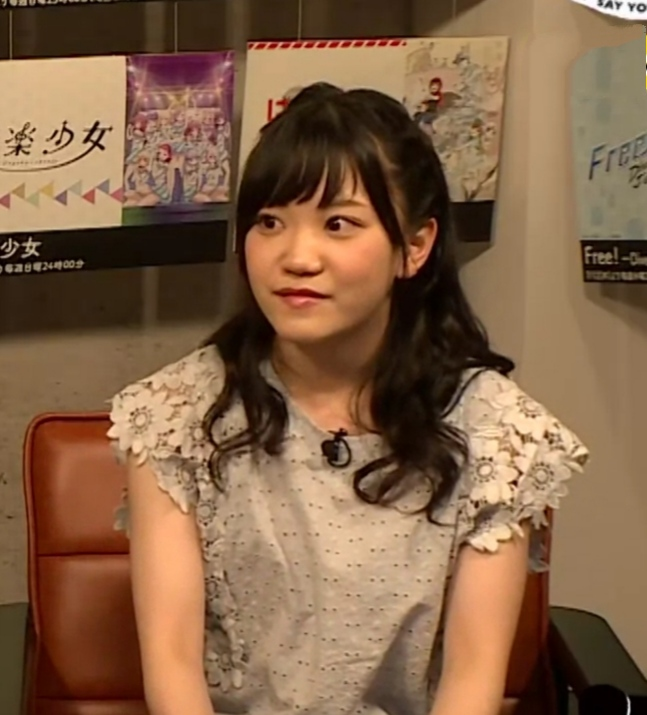
- Born: February 12, 1997 (age 29); Saitama Prefecture, Japan
- Occupation: Voice actress
- Years active: 2014–present
- Agent: Amuleto
- Spouse: Unknown (m. 2023)
- Children: 1

Hina Kino (木野 日菜, Kino Hina; born February 12, 1997) is a Japanese voice actress from Saitama Prefecture, who is affiliated with Amuleto. After starting her voice acting career in 2014, she played her first main role as Sylvia Silkcut in the 2016 anime series Hybrid × Heart Magias Academy Ataraxia. She is also known for her roles as Sayaka Itomi in Katana Maidens ~ Toji No Miko, Hanako Honda in Asobi Asobase, Ranka Okami in Seton Academy: Join the Pack!, Emu Otori in Project Sekai: Colorful Stage feat. Hatsune Miku, Lady Lishu in The Apothecary Diaries, Miri Unasaka in Buddy Daddies and Tsukuyomi in Oshi no Ko.

== Biography ==
Kino was born in Saitama Prefecture on February 12, 1997. She had been interested in anime and manga from an early age, particularly liking the series One Piece and Daily Lives of High School Boys. During her junior high school years, she became aware of the career of voice acting after watching a talk show produced by the gaming magazine Famitsu; her interest in voice acting was further influenced by watching the film One Piece: Episode of Chopper: Bloom in the Winter, Miracle Sakura. Due to these reasons, she decided to pursue a voice acting career upon entering high school.

Kino enrolled in a voice acting training school during her third year of high school. After finishing her training, she made her debut as a voice actor in the 2014 video game Thousand Memories. According to her, as it was her first role and she was nervous about how it would turn out, she decided to "practice rigorously" for the role. Her first anime followed that same year when she played the role of a waitress in an episode of the anime series A Good Librarian Like a Good Shepherd. In 2016, she played her first main role as Silvia Silkcut in the anime series Hybrid × Heart Magias Academy Ataraxia. In 2017, she played the role of Collon in the anime series WorldEnd. In 2018, she played the roles of Sayaka Itomi in Katana Maidens ~ Toji No Miko and Hanako Honda in Asobi Asobase; she together with her Asobi Asobase co-stars performed the series' opening and closing themes "Three Piece" (スリピス, Suripisu) and "Inkya Impulse" (インキャインパルス, Inkya Inparusu), respectively.

On March 21, 2023, Kino announced her marriage on Twitter.

On July 18, 2025, Kino announced that she had recently given birth to a baby boy.

== Filmography ==
=== Anime ===
2014

- A Good Librarian Like a Good Shepherd (Waitress)

2015

- Shomin Sample (Lady, Maid)
- Magical Somera-chan (Hamster, Sea Otter, Artificial Human Number 1260)

2016

- Erased (Misato)
- Aikatsu Stars! (Ayumi Naruse)
- Love Live! Sunshine!! (Student)
- Qualidea Code (Student)
- Hybrid × Heart Magias Academy Ataraxia (Sylvia Silkcut)
- Scared Rider Xechs (Female A)

2017

- Gabriel DropOut (Alexander, cat, child, crowd, girl, poodle, Ueno)
- WorldEnd (Collon)
- Senki Zesshō Symphogear AXZ (Tiki)
- Princess Principal (Julie)

2018

- Katana Maidens ~ Toji No Miko (Sayaka Itomi)
- Slow Start (Banbi Fujii)
- Steins;Gate 0 (Kaede Kurushima)
- Asobi Asobase (Hanako Honda)
- Overlord III (Kuuderika)

2019

- Mini Toji (Sayaka Itomi)
- Sword Art Online: Alicization (Linel)
- Wataten!: An Angel Flew Down to Me (Yuu Matsumoto)
- Kaguya-sama: Love Is War (Mikiti)
- Star☆Twinkle PreCure (Fuwa)
- Astra Lost in Space (Funicia Raffaëlli)
- YU-NO: A Girl Who Chants Love at the Bound of this World (Ai)
- Isekai Cheat Magician (Miro, Mero)
- African Office Worker (Sasshō Hamster)

2020

- Seton Academy: Join the Pack! (Ranka Ōkami)
- Kuma Kuma Kuma Bear (Flora)

2021

- Heaven's Design Team (Kenta)
- Irina: The Vampire Cosmonaut (Anya Simonyan)
- Fuga: Comedies of Steel (Mei Marzipan)

2022

- RPG Real Estate (Fa)
- Shine Post (Hinatsu Hinomoto)
- The Devil Is a Part-Timer!! (Alas Ramus)
- PuniRunes (Kūrune)
- Management of a Novice Alchemist (Rorea)

2023

- Buddy Daddies (Miri Unasaka)
- Ayakashi Triangle (Lucy Tsukioka)
- Campfire Cooking in Another World with My Absurd Skill (Sui)
- Classroom for Heroes (Cú Chulainn)
- Heavenly Delusion (Ohma)
- The Vexations of a Shut-In Vampire Princess (Koharu Minenaga)
- The Apothecary Diaries (Lishu)
- A Playthrough of a Certain Dude's VRMMO Life (Natalnia)

2024

- Train to the End of the World (Akira Shinonome)
- Head Start at Birth (Lilia Carol)
- No Longer Allowed in Another World (Melos)
- Oshi no Ko 2nd Season (Tsukuyomi)
- Pokétoon (Meg)

2025

- I'm Living with an Otaku NEET Kunoichi!? (Kanna Natsumi)
- Medalist (Ryōka Miketa)
- Sakamoto Days (Hana Sakamoto)
- Apocalypse Hotel (Tamako)

2026

- Chained Soldier 2 (Saki Tokoroyama)

=== Anime films ===
2025

- Colorful Stage! The Movie: A Miku Who Can't Sing (Emu Otori)

=== Web Anime ===
2024

- Negative Happy (Yuhi/Yuhi Fujimaru)

=== Video games ===
2018

- Magia Record (Ikumi Makino)

2020

- Project Sekai: Colorful Stage feat. Hatsune Miku (Emu Otori)
- Crash Fever (Benedict)

2021

- Cookie Run: Kingdom (Moon Rabbit Cookie)
- Miitopia (Mii female voice)
- Loopers (Holly)
- Deep Insanity: Asylum (Penthesilea)

2022

- Honkai Impact 3rd (Griseo)
- Anonymous;Code (Nonoka Hosho)
- World II World (Kirara)

2023

- Fire Emblem Engage (Hortensia)
- Fuga: Melodies of Steel 2 (Mei Marzipan)
- Crymachina (Lilly)
- Azur Lane (HMS Janus)
- Genshin Impact (Sigewinne)

2024

- Snowbreak: Containment Zone (Eatchel Gustav)

2025

- Trickcal: Chibi Go (Erpin)

=== Dubbing ===
==== Live-action ====
- Knock at the Cabin (Wen)

==== Animation ====
- 101 Dalmatian Street (Dallas, Deja Vu, Destiny, Snowball)
- Calamity, a Childhood of Martha Jane Cannary (Elijah)
- Masha and the Bear (Masha)

=== Live-action ===
- Anime Supremacy! (2022), Mayu (voice)
