= Hika Tsukishiro =

Japanese voice actress

- 月城 日花
- Born: March 17, 2004 (age 22); Fukuoka Prefecture, Japan
- Occupation: Voice actress
- Years active: 2019–present
- Agent: Tokyo Actor's Consumer's Cooperative Society
- Notable work: Zatsu Tabi: That's Journey as Chika Suzugamori; Umamusume: Pretty Derby as Win Variation; Alma-chan Wants to Be a Family! as Alma

Hika Tsukishiro (月城 日花, Tsukishiro Hika; born March 17, 2004) is a Japanese voice actress who is affiliated with the Tokyo Actor's Consumer's Cooperative Society. She debuted as a voice actress in 2019 after passing an audition for a role in the Monster Strike franchise. She is known for her roles as Chika Suzugamori in Zatsu Tabi: That's Journey, Win Variation in Umamusume: Pretty Derby and Alma in Alma-chan Wants to Be a Family!.

== Biography ==
Tsukishiro was born in Fukuoka Prefecture on March 17, 2004. Her interest in anime began from an early age when she would watch DVDs of Sailor Moon. During her junior high school years, she was a member of the school brass band, but lost interest after developing chūnibyō. During this time, she became a fan of Assassination Classroom, particularly the character Karma Akabane, which fueled her desire to become a voice actor. She also found it interesting that voice actors also sang for anime, which encouraged her as she liked singing. However, due to her lack of skill and difficulties in mimicking the characters' voice acting, she thought it would be difficult for her to ever become a voice actor. Her parents, however, were supportive of her dreams and she enrolled at the Fukuoka branch of the Yoyogi Animation School. At the time, she worked under the name Hika Kugisaki.

Her career began in 2019 when she became one of the winner of an open audition for roles in the Monster Strike series. When she first participated in the audition, she had only started her training and lacked experience, so she treated her initial audition like she was just practicing in front of a microphone. She became one of three winners and debuted with a role in Monster Strike. Later that year, she won a competition among all voice acting trainees of the Yoyogi Animation School's training schools.

She joined the talent agency Tokyo Actor's Consumer's Cooperative Society in 2021 and began using the stage name Hika Tsukishiro. In 2025, she played her first main role as Chika Suzugamori in the anime television series Zatsu Tabi: That's Journey. Later that year, she voiced Alma in Alma-chan Wants to Be a Family!.

== Filmography ==
=== Anime ===
2025

- Zatsu Tabi: That's Journey, Chika Suzugamori
- Alma-chan Wants to Be a Family!, Alma

2026

- Witch Hat Atelier, Richeh
- Tetsuryō! Meet with Tetsudō Musume, Usa Harutachi

2027

- Otherworldly Munchkin: Let's Speedrun the Dungeon with Only 1 HP!, Sana Kirihara

=== Games ===
2024

- Umamusume: Pretty Derby, Win Variation

2025

- Stella Sora, Chitose
