= Alma-chan Wants to Be a Family! =

Japanese manga series

- First tankōbon volume cover

少女型兵器(アルマちゃん)は家族になりたい (Aruma-chan wa Kazoku ni Naritai)
- Genre: Science fiction comedy
- Manga
- Written by: Nanateru
- Published by: Kadokawa Shoten
- English publisher: NA: Yen Press
- Imprint: Kadokawa Comics A
- Magazine: Comic Newtype
- Original run: July 9, 2021 – February 2, 2024
- Volumes: 3
- Manga

Alma-chan wa Kazoku ni Naritai Z
- Written by: Nanateru
- Published by: Kadokawa Shoten
- Imprint: Kadokawa Comics A
- Magazine: Comic Newtype
- Original run: July 19, 2024 – present
- Volumes: 2
- Anime television series
- Directed by: Yasuhiro Minami
- Written by: Yukie Sugawara
- Studio: Studio Flad
- Licensed by: Crunchyroll
- Original network: AT-X, Tokyo MX, KBS Kyoto, SUN, TVA, BS Asahi
- Original run: October 5, 2025 – December 14, 2025
- Episodes: 11

Alma-chan Wants to Be a Family! (Japanese: 少女型兵器(アルマちゃん)は家族になりたい, Hepburn: Aruma-chan wa Kazoku ni Naritai) is a Japanese manga series written and illustrated by Nanateru. It was serialized online via Kadokawa Shoten's Comic Newtype website from July 2021 to February 2024 and was collected in three tankōbon volumes. A sequel manga also illustrated by Nanateru, titled Alma-chan wa Kazoku ni Naritai Z, began serialization on the same website in July 2024. An anime television series adaptation produced by Studio Flad aired from October to December 2025.

== Plot ==
Enji Kamisato and Suzume Yobane are two genius scientists who have developed an android named Alma-chan. They designed her to be able to learn from experience and give reports about these experiences. However, because the pair created her, Alma thinks that the two are actually her parents. Using her powers, she edits the Japanese marriage registry to register them as husband and wife. The two must now live together with Alma, raising them as their daughter, all while dealing with their own feelings as a reluctant couple.

== Characters ==
Alma-chan (アルマちゃん, Aruma-chan)
Voiced by: Manaka Iwami (PV), Hika Tsukishiro (anime)
An android girl developed to have high intelligence. She is able to take in and process information around her. However, as she is still being developed, she needs to exposed to real-life situations to understand the world. She also wants to make friends, even going as far as enrolling herself in a school to do so.
Enji Kamisato (神里 エンジ, Kamisato Enji)
Voiced by: Ryōta Suzuki
One of Alma's co-developers, he is a scientist skilled in artificial intelligence. He and Suzume had been rivals since childhood, but ended up collaborating with her on Alma. Despite their initial reluctant relationship, he and Suzume later develop genuine feelings for each other, brought together by them raising Alma.
Suzume Yobane (夜羽 スズメ, Yobane Suzume)
Voiced by: M.A.O
One of Alma's co-developers, she is a scientist skilled in robotics.
Makina (マキナ)
Voiced by: Rika Nagae
Another android girl developed from plans that Suzume left behind about androids.
Neon (ネオン)
Voiced by: Hinaki Yano
The daughter of a major electronics firm, who has the appearance and personality of an ojou-sama.
Toki Kamisato (神里 トキ, Kamisato Toki)
Voiced by: Hikaru Tono
Hana Yashiki (屋敷 ハナ, Yashiki Hana)
Voiced by: Saku Mizuno
A student at an elementary school. She was previously a loner and had a poor reputation among her classmates, but things changed when Alma encounters her. One of the reasons Alma entered school was to befriend Hana.
Tokoyo Omoikane (思兼 常夜, Omoikane Tokoyo)
Voiced by: Sayaka Senbongi

== Media ==
=== Manga ===
Written and illustrated by Nanateru, Alma-chan Wants to Be a Family! was serialized on Kadokawa Shoten's Comic Newtype website from July 9, 2021, to February 2, 2024. Its chapters were collected into three tankōbon volumes released from March 10, 2022, to March 26, 2024.

In June 2026, Yen Press announced that they had licensed the series for English publication beginning in December 2026.

A sequel manga also illustrated by Nanateru, titled Alma-chan wa Kazoku ni Naritai Z, began serialization on the same website on July 19, 2024. The sequel's chapters have been collected into two tankōbon volumes as of October 2025.

==== Volumes ====
No.	Original release date	Original ISBN	English release date	English ISBN
1	March 10, 2022	978-4-04-112178-8	December 15, 2026	979-8-8554-3234-3
2	March 10, 2023	978-4-04-112934-0	—	—
3	March 26, 2024	978-4-04-114757-3	—	—

==== Alma-chan Wants to be a Family! Z ====
No.	Release date	ISBN
1	April 25, 2025	978-4-04-116175-3
2	October 10, 2025	978-4-04-116788-5

=== Anime ===
An anime television series adaptation was announced on January 17, 2025. It is produced by Studio Flad and directed by Yasuhiro Minami, with Yukie Sugawara writing series' scripts, and Mika Yamamoto designing the characters. The series aired from October 5 to December 14, 2025, on AT-X and other networks. The opening theme song is "Dramatic Overlay" (ドラマチック・オーバーレイ, Doramachikku Ōbārei), performed by Zaq, while the ending theme song is "Arifuretetai" (ありふれてたい; 'I Want to Be Ordinary'), performed by Kaf. Crunchyroll streamed the series.

==== Episodes ====
No.	Title	Directed by (Note: Production staff information is taken from the ending credits of each episode.)	Written by	Storyboarded by	Original release date
1	"Nice To Meet You"; Transliteration: "Hajimemashite" (Japanese: はじめまして)	Sota Shiro	Yukie Sugawara	Yasuhiro Minami	October 5, 2025
Genius engineer Suzume and genius artificial intelligence programmer Enji are both ostracised by the scientific community for their ridiculous theories and odd personalities. Deciding to prove their critics wrong they cooperate to build a human shaped military asset they name Autonomous Learning Military Android, or Alma. They are surprised Alma identifiers them as her parents, since they made her together and are sexually attracted to each other. Despite their immaturity concerning sex they agree to pose as Alma's parents, allowing them to keep improving her while hiding her existence. They are shocked when Alma hacks into government records and registers them as legally married, which they demand she undo immediately. To pose as a family Alma claims they should all sleep in the same room. They agree but the sudden proximity leaves them incapable of sleep, which Alma makes worse by sensing their anxiety and sexual arousal. The next day Enji tests her by sending her to buy ice cream, only Suzume panics about perverts and Enji worries she might use her weaponry in public, so they follow her. Alma meets a lost British man and, remembering her lesson on being helpful, guides him where he needs to go. Suzume and Enji are proud of her and take her to buy more ice cream, since the first one melted.
2	"Let's Eat"; Transliteration: "Itadakimasu" (Japanese: いただきます)	Reiko Nozaki	Tomayuno	Hiroaki Shimura	October 12, 2025
Alma learns to cook healthy food, as does Suzume, admitting she wants her food to make Enji happy, then insists Alma keep it secret. Enji panics by assuming Suzume is trying to impress him. Fortunately, he claims they were merely demonstrating a happy family meal. Alma tries to eat and damages herself, forcing them to build her a working stomach. While Enji works Alma goes to extremes to avoid making noise, made difficult when she accidentally turns on their suspicious robot vacuum. Suzume realises it is the first prototype she and Enji built which developed a mischievous personality. Alma decides the vacuum is her brother. With Alma living with them they decide to clean the apartment. Enji's sister Toki visits, so Alma turns herself and Suzume invisible in case Toki learns she exists or assumes Enji is dating Suzume. Toki almost sees them, so Enji makes her stop by claiming he has adult magazines hidden everywhere. Enji insists he is more comfortable living alone, making Alma curious as he lives alongside Suzume without issue. Toki finds Suzume's dirty underwear, who is so embarrassed she accidentally reveals herself. Fortunately, Toki understands about keeping Alma secret, but insists on believing Suzume is Enji's girlfriend. Alma decides Toki is her aunt while Toki decides Suzume is her new sister.
3	"See You Later"; Transliteration: "Ittekimasu" (Japanese: いってきます)	Yuji Takayama	Yukie Sugawara	Daisuke Tsukushi	October 19, 2025
Alma encounters a girl named Hana and uses her abilities to help search for her missing puppies. Hana is surprised she is a robot and that she wanted to help since her classmates all think she is scary. Alma decides she wants to be Hana's friend, so she arranges to transfer into Hana's class. Enji and Suzume rush to upgrade her overnight so she can fit in a school environment. Enji and Suzume worry about Hana keeping Alma's secret. They also grow restless as they have nothing to do without Alma there. Hana worries Alma keeps demonstrating robot abilities which luckily their classmates do not notice. When asked about her parents Alma presents a detailed report on Enji and Suzume's daily activities, including what they do at night. Her classmates assume she is talking about romantic things. Alma accidentally shows a recording of Hana with her puppies, causing their classmates to realise she is nice. Enji and Suzume are shocked when Alma returns home claiming she knows they are "lovey dovey", and has started learning bad language from the boys. Later, after bathing Alma detects Enji becomes aroused when Suzume smells nice, shocking her. Alma adds "pervert" to Enji's file. Meanwhile, two people watch their apartment from a rooftop.
4	"Hello"; Transliteration: "Konnichiwa" (Japanese: こんにちは)	Sota Shiro	Yukie Sugawara	Sota Shiro	October 26, 2025
Enji and Suzume finally clean their apartment to give Alma her own bedroom. Later, they are attacked by another robot girl, Machina, who demands a fight with Alma. Machina's head falls off and Suzume concludes her builder rushed the manufacturing process, leading to shoddy workmanship. As her goal was to prove she had surpassed Alma and not to destroy her, Enji insists they find non-violent ways of competing. After playing all day Machina's builder appears at their apartment, Tokoyo Omoikane, one of Suzume's university juniors. She admits she made Machina hoping she would impress Suzume enough to hire her as an assistant. She is instead horrified Suzume is living with Enji and raising Alma as their daughter, implying they are in a sexual relationship. Alma concludes Machina must be her younger sister. Tokoyo decides Enji has corrupted Suzume. Angry and depressed, she activates Machina's self-destruct sequence to kill them and herself. Wanting to save her new sister Alma removes Machina's head and replaces it with her own to cancel the self-destruct. Suzume and Enji confiscate Machina's body until Tokoy can be trusted with it, so she returns home with Machina's head, swearing to upgrade Machina, get revenge on Enji and return Suzume to her old self.
5	"The Moon"; Transliteration: "Otsuki-sama" (Japanese: おつきさま)	Kazuma Satō	Yukie Sugawara	Wang Zhoumei Lai Li	November 2, 2025
Enji is revealed to be scared of a ghost haunting the apartment. Lightning causes a power failure so Enji trips into Suzume's breasts and concludes it is a squishy ghost. Alma repairs the lights and they discover the original ghost was the robot vacuum. Suzume hides the identity of the "squishy ghost". Alma meets manga artist Takarada, and draws some high quality art for her. As she has deadlines Takarada desperately asks Alma to draw her manga for her. Alma agrees but soon takes over Takarada's entire job. Within weeks Takarada's manga is so popular it receives a TV series. Enji finds and scolds Alma for bothering Takarada while she is working, so Alma quits. Takarada tries to return to work but realises she has forgotten how to draw. Tokoyo reappears with a rebuilt Machina who challenges Alma to a bike race but they go so fast they leave Earth's atmosphere and crash on the moon. Low on battery Alma fears never getting back to Enji and Suzume. Floating around, Alma and Machina rescue an astronaut in trouble who cannot believe he saw real life Space Girls. They eventually find an abandoned satellite and recharge themselves with its solar panels. They manage to crash land back at the apartment where Enji and Suzume are relieved she survived. Tokoyo is furious at their family reunion and accuses Enji of flirting with Suzume again.
6	"Friends"; Transliteration: "Otomodachi" (Japanese: おともだち)	Yasuhiro Minami	Yukie Sugawara	Hiroaki Shimura	November 9, 2025
Suzume does maintenance on Alma's body, so Alma uses her toddler sized spare body. Tokoyo offers to help so Suzume shows them her lab under the apartment. Alma and Machina have fun swapping heads with one of Alma's more buxom prototype bodies. Enji is traumatised when he sees the body plus Suzume and Tokoyo in their old high school uniforms. A girl named Neon Wozniak introduces herself to Alma as heir of a military technology corporation, explaining she wishes to help Alma reach her full potential as a war machine. Enji and Suzume are furious at Neon and reject her offer to employ them for obscenely high salaries. Alma offers to be Neon's first friend, so Neon arranges to transfer into Alma's Elementary School, despite being 14 years old. Suzume catches a cold and Alma is disappointed there are no instant cures, not even secret government ones. She hears an old wives tale of inserting green onions in the rectum, which turns into a nightmare for the similarly ill Tokoyo when Machina takes the onion cure seriously. Enji is impressed with Alma's efforts since he and Suzume were never any good at looking after each other when they were ill. Suzume recovers but Alma inexplicably catches a cold, having caught a virus while hacking the shady government databases.
7	"A Project"; Transliteration: "Purojekuto" (Japanese: ぷろじぇくと)	Reiko Nozaki	Tomayuno	Reiko Nozaki	November 16, 2025
Toki visits, making Enji nervous as something about Toki always makes computers act strangely. Sure enough, Alma malfunctions after trying to decipher Toki's drawing of a bear. Everyone Alma knows visits the public baths at the same time. Alma is upset they cannot bathe with Enji, causing Tokoyo to furiously assume Suzume and Enji bathe together at home. Enji worries if Alma's artificial intelligence keeps growing while encountering so many bizarre situations there is no telling what the result will be. Alma admits she brought Enji to the baths to relax as she noticed his stress levels increasing every time she or Suzume get into a bizarre situation. Enji and Suzume are invited to Alma's school for Parent's Day. Alma and Neon reveals they got the Principal's permission for Project Amoenus; to futuristically renovate the school with a superior curriculum and robots doing 97% of the teacher's work. Eventually the plan is to expand Project Amoenus to the entire world to create an advanced utopia. Unfortunately, Machina tries to visit Alma, tripping the security system. Alma tries to intervene but loses control of everything and overheats. Enji deduces her Ai was not sufficient to run such a complex system, so he creates another AI to do it temporarily. Alma promises to improve the system next time.
8	"Play With Me"; Transliteration: "Asobō yo" (Japanese: あそぼうよ)	Harume Kosaka	Tomayuno	Hitomi Ezoe	November 23, 2025
Alma is kidnapped by a criminal named Takumi intending to ransom her. Alma allows the kidnapping so she can gain experience, calling Neon and Machina for advice. As Takumi needs money Machina suggests he get a job with whatever skills he has. Alma reveals during the kidnapping Takumi demonstrated exceptional skills at tying knots. Alma catches a nearby purse-snatcher with Takumi's rope technique, earning him praise from the crowd. Enji is horrified when Alma returns home wanting to practise tying him up, causing a misunderstanding with Suzume. Takumi finds work at a campsite tying up people's tents for them. Alma begins a sticker collecting hobby and gives Hana a dog sticker resembling her puppies, so Hana buys her a butterfly sticker in return. One of Suzume's robots goes berserk and attacks the city, growing larger every time it eats something. Toki points out the robot is behaving like a child trying to play games, so Suzume deploys all Alma's spare bodies as distractions, allowing Alma to remove its core, a prototype "Play-with-me" toy that learns from its environment. As the huge body remains stuck in the city the locals turn it into a tourist attraction. Enji scolds Suzume for causing such a mess while "Play-with-me" becomes friends with the robot vacuum.
9	"Summer Vacation"; Transliteration: "Natsuyasumi" (Japanese: なつやすみ)	Katsumi Nagai	Yukie Sugawara	Daisuke Tsukushi	November 30, 2025
Summer break arrives and Neon and Hana arrange to meet Alma for Summer Festival. While practising with her buxom body Alma accidentally knocks over a boy named Naoki who loses his house key. A cat picks it up but Alma fails to capture it as her buxom body makes her unbalanced. Naoki keeps being embarrassed by her body. They learn the key the cat stole was actually a sewing tool. Alma suddenly discovers the key in Naoki's jacket hood. Naoki is grateful as his mother gave him the keychain before she died. They part ways but Naoki is too cowardly to ask her name. A few days later he sees Alma with her original body and decides he is imagining things. For homework Alma keeps a picture diary showing the first ten days of summer were boring, so Enji decides they must do something fun. Alma plans a packed schedule to get as many activities as possible done in four days, starting with flying all the way to Neon's private Hawaiian beach. A typhoon threatens to cancel the festival, so Alma blows the clouds away with her Alma Cannon, allowing the festival to begin. Over four more days they attend the festival, ride bikes, go camping and visit penguins in Antarctica. Despite their exhaustion Enji and Suzume decide taking a break from research can be fun occasionally.
10	"Amane-Go!"	Reiko Nozaki	Yukie Sugawara	Hiroaki Shimura	December 7, 2025
Alma suffers a powerful electric shock from touching Suzume. Alma diagnoses this as powerful static electricity from Suzume's work with electrical equipment. Upset they can't hold hands, Suzume makes electricity proof rubber suits, causing a misunderstanding with Toki. Toki suggests improving Suzume's general health with a diet, exercise and proper skincare. A month later she tries to touch Alma, but the static has grown even worse. Alma suggests Enji hug Suzume to promote Oxytocin release as a form of stress relief. Alma detects they both find the experience pleasant, and it solves the static issue, allowing Suzume to hug Alma again. Alma goes viral after somebody leaks footage of her playing with construction machinery. Neon suggests using this to launch careers as an influencer group called A-Ma-Ne. They experience some popularity due to their robot abilities and while many people believe they are faking their videos with CG effects they soon reach 100,000 subscribers. They decide to perform a live concert to celebrate so Neon constructs a large theatre for the event. They perform an original song they wrote with dance moves, making their channel number one across the entire world. Unfortunately, Machina becomes so excited she detaches her head on camera and their account is permanently shut down.
11	"I Want To Be A Family"; Transliteration: "Kazoku ni Naritai" (Japanese: かぞくになりたい)	Yasuhiro Minami	Yukie Sugawara	Yasuhiro Minami	December 14, 2025
Scientists from The Institute decide to invite Enji and Suzume to work in America. Enji and Suzume plan to refuse, but Alma insists a better revenge is getting their former critics to admit their work is genius. The Americans offer them huge salaries, a lab and a mansion. Enji and Suzume are soon so busy they spend almost no time with Alma, making her lonely. Soon, a next generation robot called Familia is revealed to the public, having been built by Enji and Suzume who are so busy they miss the anniversary of when Alma was first switched on, her birthday. Enji and Suzume receive a distress call from Robot Vacuum that Alma has run away. Enji is annoyed as they are close to achieving their lifelong dream of respect and recognition. Suzume is furious and reminds him Alma is their daughter, not another prototype. Ashamed, Enji joins the search and Neon sends Machina across the world to find Alma. They find her at their apartment in Japan and explain they quit their jobs so they can be a family again. Enji reveals for work he has founded his own robotics company, Kamisato Software. Suzume surprises him by revealing she also opened her own company, Yobane Mechatronics. Enji embarrassingly asks if maybe their companies could merger, shocking all their eavesdropping friends who were sure he was about to propose marriage. They return to living in their apartment and life returns to normal.

=== Other adaptations ===
In commemoration of the release of the first volume a promotional video was uploaded to the Kadokawa Anime YouTube channel on March 10, 2022. The video featured the voice performance of Manaka Iwami as the titular character.

== Reception ==
The series was nominated for the seventh Next Manga Award in 2021 in the web category.
