= Asobi Asobase =

Japanese manga series by Rin Suzukawa

- First tankōbon volume cover, featuring Olivia

あそびあそばせ
- Genre: Surreal comedy
- Manga
- Written by: Rin Suzukawa
- Published by: Hakusensha
- English publisher: NA: Comikey (digital); Dark Horse Comics (print)
- Magazine: Young Animal Densi/Manga Park (2015–2022); Young Animal (2016–2022)
- Original run: June 26, 2015 – November 11, 2022
- Volumes: 15
- Anime television series
- Directed by: Seiji Kishi
- Produced by: Shō Tanaka; Shigeki Yamada; Aya Iizuka; Kaori Kimura; Mitsuhiro Ogata
- Written by: Yūko Kakihara
- Music by: Masato Koda
- Studio: Lerche
- Licensed by: Crunchyroll (streaming); SA/SEA: Muse Communication
- Original network: AT-X, Tokyo MX, KBS, BS11, Sun TV, TVA
- Original run: July 8, 2018 – September 23, 2018
- Episodes: 12 + OVA + 2 Specials

Asobi Asobase (あそびあそばせ) is a Japanese manga series written and illustrated by Rin Suzukawa. It began serialization on Hakusensha's Young Animal Densi website in June 2015; it also began serialization in Young Animal in November 2016 and finished in November 2022. Its chapters were collected in fifteen tankōbon volumes. An anime television series adaptation by Lerche aired in Japan from July to September 2018.

== Plot ==
The series centers on Hanako Honda, Olivia, and Kasumi Nomura, second-year students at an all-girls middle school and the only three members of the Pastimers Club, a not officially recognized club. The club has very ambiguous goals, usually consisting of whatever so-called "pastimes" the girls happen to think up.

== Characters ==
Hanako Honda (本田 華子, Honda Hanako)
Voiced by: Hina Kino
Hanako is Olivia and Kasumi's classmate who is extremely energetic, dragging both of them into her pace by playing strange games at school. Despite her childish nature, she is shown to be highly intelligent in her academics and is a natural talent in sports, although she has no interest in them. Her family is shown to be wealthy, having a butler and being able to obtain objects upon request.
Olivia (オリヴィア, Orivia)
Voiced by: Rika Nagae
Olivia is Hanako and Kasumi's classmate who pretends to be an American transfer student despite having been born and raised in Japan with foreign parents. Thus, she pretends to speak in broken Japanese to keep her image while gradually getting better to solidify her act.
Kasumi Nomura (野村 香純, Nomura Kasumi)
Voiced by: Konomi Kohara
Kasumi is Olivia and Hanako's classmate who dislikes playing games due to her sister's constant teasing when she was younger. She is very bad at English. She enjoys writing BL fantasies, though ironically, she is extremely androphobic.
Chisato Higuchi (樋口 千紗都, Higuchi Chisato)
Voiced by: Ryōko Maekawa
Chisato is a female teacher who is blackmailed into becoming the advisor for the Pastimers Club. She often feels downhearted over not being able to find a husband.
Maeda (前多)
Voiced by: Ryōtarō Okiayu
Maeda is Hanako's family butler. Due to being probed by aliens, he is capable of firing laser beams out of his butt. He can quickly build or procure any item that Hanako asks for, from an inflatable kiddie pool to a robot that speaks in pre-programmed English phrases.
Student Council President (生徒会長, Seitokaichō)
Voiced by: Honoka Inoue
She is a quiet, bespectacled girl whose real name has not been revealed. Despite her timid demeanor, she managed to win her position anyway due to her vice president's speech that sounded threatening to the rest of the student body. She constantly throws up procedural barriers for the Pastimers Club, and wavers between trying to be friends with them or undermining their club. She also has a habit of seeming terrifying and condescending when she is actually trying to be compassionate.
Oka (岡)
Voiced by: Mai Kanazawa
Nicknamed "Ruu" (るう, Rū), Oka is the leader of the Occult Research Club who befriends the Pastimers Club, teaching them occult-themed games.
Aguri Matō (間桐 あぐり, Matō Aguri)
Voiced by: Megumi Toda
Nicknamed "Agrippa" (アグリッパ, Agurippa), Aguri is Oka's fellow member in the Occult Research Club. She was temporarily out of school for medical reasons.
Tsugumi Aozora (青空 つぐみ, Aozora Tsugumi)
Voiced by: Aoi Yūki
Tsugumi is a classmate who the Pastimers suspect of being an otokonoko, especially after Olivia overheard Tsugumi breaks up with a boy saying that they have the same thing down there. This led the group to go to great lengths to find out if Tsugumi is really a boy who infiltrated the all-girls school. Tsugumi, being all too aware of their intentions, enjoys teasing the club in return, especially Kasumi.
Sainan (済南)
Voiced by: Yasunori Masutani
Sainan is the school's language teacher who often becomes the hapless victim of the girls' mischief.
Takayanagi (高柳)
Voiced by: Mitsuki Saiga
Takayanagi is the school guidance councilor who is rather manly in appearance. She has an equally manly younger sister in her third year who is president of the Swimming Club.
Kentarō Honda (本田 健太郎, Honda Kentarō)
Voiced by: Eishin Fudemura
Kentarō is Hanako's younger brother.
Olivia's Brother (オリヴィアの兄, Orivia no Ani)
Voiced by: Toshiyuki Morikawa
Olivia's older brother, he is an otaku who has two PhDs.

== Media ==
=== Manga ===
Written and illustrated by Rin Suzukawa, Asobi Asobase began serialization on Hakusensha's Young Animal Densi website on June 26, 2015, which was later replaced by Hakusensha's Manga Park website on August 1, 2017. The series also began serialization in Young Animal on November 25, 2016. It finished serialization on November 11, 2022. Hakusensha collected its chapters in fifteen tankōbon volumes, released from February 29, 2016, to November 29, 2022.

Comikey digitally published the manga in English. In March 2026, Dark Horse Comics announced that it had licensed the manga for English release in North America.

==== Volumes ====
No.	Original release date	Original ISBN	English release date	English ISBN
1	February 29, 2016	978-4-59-214179-2	January 5, 2027	978-1-50-675654-7
1. "Equivalent Exchange" (等価交換, Tōka kōkan); 2. "Cheap Thrills" (チープなスリル, Chīpuna suriru); 3. "Pastimer" (遊び人, Asobinin); 4. "Killing Time" (暇つぶし, Himatsubushi); 5. "A Kind Pervert" (優しい変態, Yasashī hentai); 6. "Friendship Game" (友情ゲーム, Yūjō gēmu); 7. "Witch Trial" (魔女裁判, Majo saiban); 8. "Non-Title Match" (ノンタイトルマッチ, Non taitoru matchi); 9. "A Battle I Can’t Afford to Lose" (絶対に負けられない戦い, Zettai ni make rarenai tatakai); 10. "Marionette" (操り人形, Ayatsuri ningyō); 11. "Illegal Occupation" (不法占拠, Fuhō senkyo)
2	August 29, 2016	978-4-59-214180-8	January 5, 2027	978-1-50-675654-7
12. "Life on the Line" (命懸け, Inochigake); 13. "Lower Body Beam" (下半身からビーム, Kahanshin kara bīmu); 14. "Devilish Sense" (悪魔的センス, Akuma-teki sensu); 15. "The Pot Calls the Kettle Black" (目クソ鼻クソ, Me kuso hana kuso); 16. "The Butt Game" (尻遊び, Shiri asobi); 17. "Leading Questions" (誘導尋問, Yūdō jinmon); 18. "Maeda's Curse" (前多の呪い, Maeda no noroi); 19. "Sex Education" (性教育, Seikyōiku); 20. "Makeover" (イメチェン, Imechen); 21. "Fierce Battle, Once Again" (激闘、再び, Gekitō, futatabi); 22. "Phantom Thief Pasclub" (怪盗・あそ研, Kaitō Aso-ken)
3	February 28, 2017	978-4-59-214708-4	January 5, 2027	978-1-50-675654-7
23. "Girl of Horror" (恐怖の女, Kyōfu no on'na); 24. "Asterisk" (アスタリスク, Asutarisuku); 25. "Test Prep" (テスト勉強, Tesuto benkyō); 26. "Go By Wackiness" (電波でGO, Denpa de GO); 27. "The Boob Tragedy" (おっぱいの悲劇, Oppai no higeki); 28. "Gotta Catch 'Em Mold!" (バイキン、ゲットだぜ！, Baikin, Getto da ze!); 29. "Worries of a Foreigner Wannabe" (エセ外国人の悩み, Ese gaikokujin no nayami); 30. "The Devil's Board Game" (魔のスゴロク, Ma no sugoroku); 31. "A Kind Teacher" (優しい先生, Yasashī sensei); Bonus: "Filmmaking" (映画制作, Eiga seisaku)
4	August 29, 2017	978-4-59-214709-1	January 5, 2027 (first omnibus); April 20, 2027 (second omnibus)	978-1-50-675654-7 (first omnibus); 978-1-50-675655-4 (second omnibus)
32. "Dutch Wife" (ダッチなワイフ, Datchina waifu); 33. "Genetic Engineering" (遺伝子操作, Idenshi sōsa); 34. "Heart Goes Hop" (心がぴょんぴょん, Kokoro ga pyon pyon); 35. "Hanako's Indecency Trial" (華子のハレンチ裁判, Hanako no harenchi saiban); 36. "Divine Revelation" (神の啓示, Kaminokeiji); 37. "The Secret of the Peen" (ティンPOの秘密, TinPO no himitsu); 38. "Goodbye Student Council President" (さよなら生徒会長, Sayonara seito kaichō); 39. "Occlub Witch Project" (オカケン・ウィッチ・プロジェクト, Okaken uitchi purojekuto); 40. "Lethal Face" (顔面凶器, Ganmen kyōki); Bonus: "Paper-Only War" (紙のみぞ戦争, Kaminomizo sensō)
5	January 26, 2018	978-4-59-214710-7	April 20, 2027	978-1-50-675655-4
41. "Re: Zero -Starting Surgery for Another Face-" (Re:ゼロから始める顔面修正, Re:Zero kara hajimeru ganmen shūsei); 42. "Daniel" (ダニエル, Danieru); 43. "Cosplaying Contest" (コスプレ大会, Kosupure taikai); 44. "Little Brother" (おとうと, Otōto); 45. "Bra Meeting" (ブラ会議, Bura kaigi); 46. "Märchen Battle Royal" (メルヘン・バトルロワイヤル, Meruhen batoru rowaiyaru); 47. "Occlub Witch Project 2" (オカケン・ウィッチ・プロジェクト2, Okaken uitchi purojekuto 2); 48. "Dear Adult Me" (大人の私へ, Otona no watashi e); 49. "Arm Strong" (アームストロング, Āmusutorongu)
6	June 29, 2018	978-4-59-216126-4	April 20, 2027	978-1-50-675655-4
50. "A Goddess Emerges" (女神爆誕, Megami bakutan); 51. "Pandemic" (パンデミック, Pandemikku); 52. "Life's Underdog" (人生の弱者, Jinsei no jakusha); 53. "Ressentiment" (ルサンチマン, Rusanchiman); 54. "Enchanted" (魔法にかけられて, Mahōnikakerarete); 55. "Savage King" (鬼畜王, Kichikuō); 56. "Brown Investigation" (茶色の研究, Chairo no kenkyū); 57. "Curse" (呪い, Noroi); 58. "Friction" (摩擦運動, Masatsu undō)
7	December 26, 2018	978-4-59-216127-1; 978-4-59-210522-0 (SE)	April 20, 2027	978-1-50-675655-4
59. "The Red-Headed Magician" (赤紙の奇術師, Akagami no kijutsushi); 60. "To You in Full Nude" (はだかざかりの君たちへ, Wada kazakari no kimitachi e); 61. "Destroying Friendships" (友情破壊, Yūjō hakai); 62. "Camera Techniques" (撮影技術, Satsuei gijutsu); 63. "Hana-chan, Jack of All Trades" (万事屋 華ちゃん, Yorozuya Hana-chan); 64. "Ressentiment Dies" (ルサンチマン死す, Rusanchiman shisu); 65. "OP Order Mistake" (OP発注ミス, OP hatchū misu); 66. "Cheating" (堪忍ぐ, Kan'nin gu); 67. "Hanakopoint" (Hanako point); 68. "Reverse-Hanako"
8	August 29, 2019	978-4-59-216128-8	April 20, 2027 (second omnibus)	978-1-50-675655-4 (second omnibus)
69. "The President's Abnormal Affection, or 'How I Stopped Caring about Everything and Started Loving Vegetable Juice'" (部長の異常な愛情または私は如何にしてもうすべてどうでもよくなっちゃってヤサイジュースを愛するようになったか, Buchō no ijōna aijō matawa watashi wa ikanishite mo usu bete dō demo yoku natchatte yasaijūsu o aisuru yō ni natta ka); 70. "Romancing Saga" (ロマンシング性, Romanshingu-sei); 71. "Time Traveler" (タイムトラベラー, Taimutoraberā); 72. "Beth's Feelings" (ベスの想い, Besu no omoi); 73. "The Elite Four's Skills" (四天王の実力, Shiten'nō no jitsuryoku); 74. "Who-Are-You" (あいつバカだから, Aitsu bakadakara); 75. "Hunter of Darkness" (闇を狩るもの, Yami o karu mono); 76. "Occlub Witch Project 3" (オカケン・ウィッチ・プロジェクト3, Okaken uitchi purojekuto 3); 77. "The Price of a Curse" (呪いの代償, Noroi no daishō)
9	February 28, 2020	978-4-59-216129-5	–	—
78. "Truth or Dare" (告白か挑戦か, Kokuhaku ka chōsen ka); 79. "It Takes Two to Tango" (どっちもどっち, Dotchi mo dotchi); 80. "Making up Part 1" (仲直り その①, Nakanaori sono ①); 81. "Making up Part 2" (仲直り その②, Nakanaori sono ②); 82. "That Sort of Background" (そういう設定, Sōiu settei); 83. "I Want to Be Happy" (幸せになりたい, Shiawaseninaritai); 84. "Who-are-you" (DA・RE・DA); 85. "The Day I Told a White Lie" (優しい嘘をついた日, Yasashī uso o tsuita hi); 86. "Counseling" (カウンセリング, Kaunseringu)
10	August 28, 2020	978-4-59-216130-1	–	—
87. "Happy-chan" (ハッピーちゃん, Happī-chan); 88. "A Clockwork Hanako's Place" (時計仕掛けの華子ん家, Tokei shikake no Hanako); 89. "Priorities" (優先順位, Yūsen jun'i); 90. "Legal High" (リーガルハイ, Rīgaruhai); 91. "Turing Test" (チューリングテスト, Chūringutesuto); 92. "Summer Vacation" (サマーバケーション, Samābakēshon); 93. "Communicating With the Eyes" (目と目で通じ合う, Me to me de tsūji au); 94. "Bling-Bling" (ブリンブリン, Burinburin); 95. "Patience Test" (忍耐力測定, Nintai-ryoku sokutei)
11	February 26, 2021	978-4-59-216196-7	–	—
96. "Battle Royale ①" (バトルロイヤル①, Batoru roiyaru ①); 97. "Battle Royale ②" (バトルロイヤル②, Batoru roiyaru ②); 98. "Battle Royale ③" (バトルロイヤル③, Batoru roiyaru ③); 99. "Serial Killer" (シリアルキラー, Shiriarukirā); 100. "Your Name" (君の名は, Kiminonaha); 101. "Discussing Worries" (お悩み相談, Onayami sōdan); 102. "Phone Number" (電話相談, Denwa sōdan); 103. "Model" (MODEL); 104. "Dummy" (おバカちゃん, Obaka-chan)
12	July 29, 2021	978-4-59-216197-4	–	—
105. "Gigolo" (ジゴロ, Jigoro); 106. "Rivals" (ライバル, Raibaru); 107. "Bayside Shakedown" (踊る【大】捜査線, Odoru [ō ] sōsa-sen); 108. "Multiverse Hanako" (マルチバース華子, Maruchibāsu Hanako); 109. "Psychopath Othello Part 1" (サイコパス・オセロ その①, Saikopasu osero sono ①); 110. "Psychopath Othello Part 2" (サイコパス・オセロ その②, Saikopasu osero sono ②); 111. "The A-Files" (A-ファイル, A-fairu); 112. "A Midsummer Olivia's Dream" (真夏のオリヴィアの夢, Manatsu no Orivia no yume)
13	January 28, 2022	978-4-59-216198-1	–	—
113. "Mr. MAtsuDo"; 114. "Exor-shit-st" (エ糞シスト, E kuso shisuto); 115. "The Collage of That Day" (あの日のコラージュ, Ano nitsu no korāju); 116. "Terrifying Children, Part I" (恐るべき子供たち（前編）, Osorubeki kodomotachi (zenpen)); 117. "Terrifying Children, Part II" (恐るべき子供たち（後編）, Osorubeki kodomotachi (kōhen)); 118. "What Happened to Kasumi?" (何が香純に起こったか？, Nani ga Kasumi ni okotta ka?); 119. "Dissecting Friends" (Friendsの解剖, Friends no kaibō)
14	November 29, 2022	978-4-59-216199-8	–	—
120. "Matsudo-sensei's Box, Part I" (松戸先生の匣（前編）, Matsudo-sensei no kushige (zenpen)); 121. "Matsudo-sensei's Box, Part II" (松戸先生の匣（後編）, Matsudo-sensei no kushige (kōhen)); 122. "Girls' Night" (女子会, Onagokai); 123. "Fake" (FAKE); 124. "MLP & UDON"; 125. "Myumyu's Cheek Pouches" (ミュウミュウの頬袋, Myūmyū no hōbukuro)
15	November 29, 2022	978-4-59-216200-1	–	—
126. "Reboot" (再起動, Saikidō); 127. "To Each Their Own Choice, Part I" (それぞれの選択（前編）, Sorezore no sentaku (zenpen)); 128. "To Each Their Own Choice, Part II" (それぞれの選択（後編）, Sorezore no sentaku (kōhen)); 129. "Stairway to Heaven" (天国への階段, Tengokuhenokaidan); 130. "Onee-chan" (お姉ちゃん, Onē-chan); 131. "Game with a God" (神との遊び, Kami to no asobi); 132. "Starting Tomorrow..." (明日から..., Ashita kara...)

=== Anime ===
A 12-episode anime television series adaptation, directed by Seiji Kishi and animated by Lerche, aired from July 8 to September 23, 2018. The scripts were written by Yuko Kakihara and the music was composed by Masato Koda. The opening theme song is "Three Piece" (スリピス, Suripisu), while the ending theme song is "Inkya Impulse" (インキャインパルス, Inkya Inparusu), both by Hina Kino, Rika Nagae and Konomi Kohara. Crunchyroll streamed the series outside Asia. In Southeast Asia and South Asia, Muse Communication licensed the series and streamed it on their Muse Asia YouTube channel. An original video animation episode was bundled with the manga's seventh volume on December 26, 2018.

==== Episodes ====
No.	Title (Note: All English titles are taken from Crunchyroll.)	Original release date
1	"Equivalent Exchange"; Transliteration: "Tōka Kōkan" (Japanese: 等価交換)	July 8, 2018
1	"Cheap Thrills"; Transliteration: "Chīpu na Suriru" (Japanese: チープなスリル)	July 8, 2018
1	"Pleasure Seekers"; Transliteration: "Asobinin" (Japanese: 遊び人)	July 8, 2018
1	"The Kind Pervert"; Transliteration: "Yasashī Hentai" (Japanese: 優しい変態)	July 8, 2018
Annoyed by her noisy classmates Hanako and Olivia, Kasumi shows them how to play a proper game of "look over there". Struggling in her English grades, Kasumi tries to get English lessons from Olivia, who secretly does not know any English, in exchange for teaching her Japanese pastimes. To this end, Kasumi sets up a Pastimers Club and recruits Hanako and Olivia as members, with their first activity being playing in an inflatable pool.
2	"Killing Time"; Transliteration: "Himatsubushi" (Japanese: 暇つぶし)	July 15, 2018
2	"Friendship Game"; Transliteration: "Yūjō Gēmu" (Japanese: 友情ゲーム)	July 15, 2018
2	"The Witch Trials"; Transliteration: "Majo Saiban" (Japanese: 魔女裁判)	July 15, 2018
2	"Non-title Match"; Transliteration: "Non Taitoru Matchi" (Japanese: ノンタイトルマッチ)	July 15, 2018
The girls unsuccessfully try to negotiate with the student council president to get their Pastimers Club officially recognised and obtain funds. Afterwards, Kasumi confronts Olivia over how she does not actually know English. Later, Hanako tries on some makeup before challenging the soft tennis club with hagoita rackets.
3	"A Battle That Must Be Won"; Transliteration: "Zettai ni Makerarenai Tatakai" (Japanese: 絶対に負けられない戦い)	July 22, 2018
3	"Puppets"; Transliteration: "Ayatsuri Ningyō" (Japanese: 操り人形)	July 22, 2018
3	"Betting My Life"; Transliteration: "Inochigake" (Japanese: 命懸け)	July 22, 2018
The girls play a game in which the loser must smell the others' armpits, which turns deadly when it becomes apparent how bad Olivia's pits smell. Later, teacher Chisato Higuchi seeks the girls help in finding love, only to get blackmailed into becoming their club advisor. Afterwards, the girls are challenged by the Shogi Club for the right to use their clubroom.
4	"Lower Body Lasers"; Transliteration: "Kahanshin Kara Bīmu" (Japanese: 下半身からビーム)	July 29, 2018
4	"Pots and Kettles"; Transliteration: "Me Kuso Hana Kuso" (Japanese: 目クソ鼻クソ)	July 29, 2018
4	"Illegal Occupation"; Transliteration: "Fuhō Senkyo" (Japanese: 不法占拠)	July 29, 2018
4	"Butt Play"; Transliteration: "Shiri Asobi" (Japanese: 尻遊び)	July 29, 2018
Not being able to tell a young Hanako the rules of shogi, her butler Maeda spends most of her childhood shooting laser beams out of his butt. Chisato hears from one of her college friends about an alleged "Lord of Pastimers", who turns out to be something else entirely. After playing teshuo sumo together, Hanako discovers Kasumi's hobby of writing yaoi novel, which happens to be a Harry Potter × Draco Malfoy BL fanfic, leading to Maeda offering advice on writing a boys' love novel.
5	"Devilish Taste"; Transliteration: "Akuma-teki Sensu" (Japanese: 悪魔的センス)	August 5, 2018
5	"Loaded Questions"; Transliteration: "Yūdō Jinmon" (Japanese: 誘導尋問)	August 5, 2018
5	"Maeda's Curse"; Transliteration: "Maeda no Noroi" (Japanese: 前多の呪い)	August 5, 2018
5	"Sex Ed"; Transliteration: "Seikyōiku" (Japanese: 性教育)	August 5, 2018
Hanako wears a rather bizarre outfit that proves distracting for Kasumi and Olivia during a study session at a restaurant. Olivia discovers that there is allegedly a crossdressing boy attending their school, suspecting it may be their classmate Tsugumi Aozora. Oka, the sole member of the Supernatural Club, teaches the Pastimers Club an occult pastime. Later, the girls have an awkward conversation about how babies are made.
6	"Asterisk"; Transliteration: "Asuterisuku" (Japanese: アスタリスク)	August 12, 2018
6	"Studying for Exams"; Transliteration: "Tesuto Benkyō" (Japanese: テスト勉強)	August 12, 2018
6	"A New Look"; Transliteration: "Imechen" (Japanese: イメチェン)	August 12, 2018
6	"Spirited Combat, Again"; Transliteration: "Gekitō, Futatabi" (Japanese: 激闘、再び)	August 12, 2018
Oka learns that her former clubmate Aguri Mato fell ill and tries voodoo to make her better. Hanako feels downhearted when she places second in her class, so Maeda makes her an android to help her study. Olivia attempts to cut her own hair with disastrous results. Later, the gang play yet another bizarre pastime.
7	"Phantom Thieves: Pass Club"; Transliteration: "Kaitō Aso-ken" (Japanese: 怪盗・あそ研)	August 19, 2018
7	"Woman of Terror"; Transliteration: "Kyōfu no On'na" (Japanese: 恐怖の女)	August 19, 2018
7	"Weirdo Go"; Transliteration: "Denpa de Gō" (Japanese: 電波でGO)	August 19, 2018
7	"Boobie Tragedy"; Transliteration: "Oppai no Higeki" (Japanese: おっぱいの悲劇)	August 19, 2018
Tsugumi asks the girls to sneak into the student council's office and steal something known as the "Banana Papers". After successfully stealing it without being discovered, the gang learn that the papers are in fact a log of incidents caused by the Pastimers Club. Later, Kasumi helplessly stands outside the classroom while Hanako sneaks a peek at her BL novel. Afterwards, Hanako and Olivia try to help Kasumi with a shirt that is too small for her bust.
8	"Gotta Catch 'em All!"; Transliteration: "Baikin, Getto da ze" (Japanese: バイキン、ゲットだぜ)	August 26, 2018
8	"Divine Revelation"; Transliteration: "Kami no Keiji" (Japanese: 神の啓示)	August 26, 2018
8	"The Evil Sugoroku"; Transliteration: "Ma no Sugoroku" (Japanese: 魔のスゴロク)	August 26, 2018
Olivia plays a game about catching bacteria around the classroom. Hanako ends up regretting buying a ridiculous looking dress she bought during a shopping trip with everyone. Hanako and Kasumi decide to test Olivia's luck with a penalty-ridden game of sugoroku.
9	"Troubles of a Fake Foreigner"; Transliteration: "Ese Gaikokujin no Nayami" (Japanese: エセ外国人の悩み)	September 2, 2018
9	"A Dutchey Wife"; Transliteration: "Datchi na Waifu" (Japanese: ダッチなワイフ)	September 2, 2018
9	"Genetic Engineering"; Transliteration: "Idenshi Sōsa" (Japanese: 遺伝子操作)	September 2, 2018
Olivia asks Hanako to help change her reputation as an English-speaking foreigner. When Olivia is chosen to represent the class in an English-speaking competition, she tries to find a quick way out. Olivia's older brother is called to school to apologize to the teacher after she is caught reading manga in class.
10	"Heart Go Boing Boing"; Transliteration: "Kokoro ga Pyon Pyon" (Japanese: 心がぴょんぴょん)	September 9, 2018
10	"Hanako's Trial of Shame"; Transliteration: "Hanako no Harenchi Saiban" (Japanese: 華子のハレンチ裁判)	September 9, 2018
10	"Secret of the Dong"; Transliteration: "TinPO no Himitsu" (Japanese: ティンPOの秘密)	September 9, 2018
10	"Film Production"; Transliteration: "Eiga Seisaku" (Japanese: 映画制作)	September 9, 2018
English-speaking classmate Fujiwara learns about Olivia's inability to speak English, while Kasumi is suddenly kissed by Tsugumi. Upon hearing about this, Hanako flips out and puts Kasumi on trial. After having a dubious dream that she cannot get her mind off of, Kasumi becomes determined to look up Tsugumi's skirt to properly determine their gender. Later, the girls film a sci-fi movie for the upcoming culture festival.
11	"Goodbye, Student Council President"; Transliteration: "Sayonara Seito-kaichō" (Japanese: さよなら生徒会長)	September 16, 2018
11	"Oka-ken Witch Project"; Transliteration: "Okaken Witchi Purojekuto" (Japanese: オカケン・ウィッチ・プロジェクト)	September 16, 2018
11	"Face of Mass Destruction"; Transliteration: "Ganmen Kyōki" (Japanese: 顔面凶器)	September 16, 2018
The student council president tries to sneak out to visit the nearby boys' school across the street, which the vice-president always ditches work to go to. Meanwhile, the Supernatural Club make some cookies for the upcoming culture festival, which they give to the language teacher to taste test. Later, the vice-president has to deal with the Pastimers Club members trying to get their culture festival project approved as she tries to put her makeup on.
12	"Daniel"; Transliteration: "Danieru" (Japanese: ダニエル)	September 23, 2018
12	"Bra Meeting"; Transliteration: "Bura Kaigi" (Japanese: ブラ会議)	September 23, 2018
12	"Fairy Tale Battle Royale"; Transliteration: "Meruhen Batoru Rowaiyaru" (Japanese: メルヘン・バトルロワイヤル)	September 23, 2018
12	"Paper Wars"; Transliteration: "Kaminomizo Sensō" (Japanese: 紙のみぞ戦争)	September 23, 2018
The Pastimers Club look after Chisato's friend's baby Daniel, who they soon discover has a bad attitude for his age. Hanako looks into buying her first bra, only to discover her bust is smaller than she thought. The girls play a cutesy appearing online game, which soon turns out to be a gory battle royale game. Afterwards, the girls, along with Maeda, play a drawing battle game that makes little sense.
OVA	"Cosplay Contest"; Transliteration: "Kosupure Taikai" (Japanese: コスプレ大会)	December 26, 2018
OVA	"To the Future Me"; Transliteration: "Otona no Watashi e" (Japanese: 大人の私へ)	December 26, 2018
The Pastimers Club decide what to wear at the premiere of their movie at the cultural festival. The Eiken (Film Studies) Club, consisting of a young Chisato, Andou and Hijiri, write future letters to themselves on an iMac 15 years previously.

==== Specials ====
No.	Title	Original release date
1	"Little Brother"; Transliteration: "Otōto" (Japanese: おとうと)	November 28, 2018
The Pastimers Club meets Hanako's little brother Ken, and they play games at the park.
2	"Armstrong"; Transliteration: "Āmusutorongu" (Japanese: アームストロング)	December 21, 2018
The Pastimers Club hold an arm wrestling contest.

== Reception ==
In 2017, the series was ranked 19th at the third Next Manga Awards in the print category.
