= Wataten! =

Japanese manga series and its adaptations

- Wataten!: An Angel Flew Down to Me
- Cover of the first manga volume, featuring (left-to-right) Hana Shirosaki and Miyako Hoshino

私に天使が舞い降りた! (Watashi ni Tenshi ga Maiorita!)
- Genre: Comedy, yuri
- Manga
- Written by: Nanatsu Mukunoki
- Published by: Ichijinsha
- Imprint: Yuri Hime Comics
- Magazine: Comic Yuri Hime
- Original run: November 18, 2016 – April 17, 2025
- Volumes: 16
- Anime television series
- Directed by: Daisuke Hiramaki
- Written by: Yuka Yamada
- Music by: Takurō Iga
- Studio: Doga Kobo
- Licensed by: Crunchyroll
- Original network: Tokyo MX, BS11, KBS, SUN, TVA, TVQ
- Original run: January 8, 2019 – March 26, 2019
- Episodes: 12 + OVA
- Anime film

Wataten!: An Angel Flew Down to Me: Precious Friends
- Directed by: Daisuke Hiramaki
- Written by: Yuka Yamada
- Studio: Doga Kobo
- Licensed by: Crunchyroll
- Released: October 14, 2022
- Runtime: 67 minutes
- icon

Wataten!: An Angel Flew Down to Me (Japanese: 私に天使が舞い降りた!, Hepburn: Watashi ni Tenshi ga Maiorita!) is a Japanese four-panel yuri comedy manga series written and illustrated by Nanatsu Mukunoki. The series was published in Ichijinsha's Comic Yuri Hime magazine from November 2016 to April 2025. An anime television series adaptation produced by Doga Kobo aired in Japan between January and March 2019. A theatrical anime film titled Wataten!: An Angel Flew Down to Me: Precious Friends premiered in October 2022.

== Plot ==
Miyako Hoshino is a very shy college student. When her younger sister Hinata Hoshino brings home her classmate, Hana Shirosaki, Miyako becomes enchanted by her cuteness and begins having her dress up in cosplay in exchange for snacks. The series follows Miyako as she grows closer to Hana, along with Hinata's other friends, Noa Himesaka, Koyori Tanemura, and Kanon Konomori.

== Characters ==
Miyako Hoshino (星野 みやこ, Hoshino Miyako)
Voiced by: Reina Ueda
A college student who is very shy around strangers and spends most of her time indoors. She becomes smitten by Hana and starts making her snacks in exchange for getting her to dress up in the cosplay outfits she makes. She pursues a career as a fashion designer.
Hinata Hoshino (星野 ひなた, Hoshino Hinata)
Voiced by: Rika Nagae
Miyako's younger sister and Hana's classmate. She is particularly fond of her sister, who she nicknames "Mya-nee" (みゃー姉), and has a considerable sister complex.
Hana Shirosaki (白咲 花, Shirosaki Hana)
Voiced by: Maria Sashide
An elementary school student who is classmates with Hinata. She is often disturbed by Miyako's behavior but puts up with it to eat her sweets.
Noa Himesaka (姫坂 乃愛, Himesaka Noa)
Voiced by: Akari Kitō
Hana and Hinata's classmate who moves next door to Miyako and Hinata. She constantly sees herself as cute and has quite a superiority/inferiority complex, often becoming downhearted when someone else (usually Hana) is said to be cuter, and has a crush on Hinata.
Koyori Tanemura (種村 小依, Tanemura Koyori)
Voiced by: Hitomi Ōwada
A class representative in Hana's class. She aspires to be someone that everyone can rely on, but is often unreliable herself.
Kanon Konomori (小之森 夏音, Konomori Kanon)
Voiced by: Naomi Ōzora
Another class representative in Hana's class and Koyori's best friend. She is kind and often seen as very reliable, much to Koyori's chagrin.
Koko Matsumoto (松本 香子, Matsumoto Kōko)
Voiced by: Lynn
A girl who was in a club with Miyako during high school. While Miyako hardly remembers her, she has been obsessively fixated on her, acting like a stalker.
Chizuru Hoshino (星野 千鶴, Hoshino Chizuru)
Voiced by: Ami Koshimizu
Miyako and Hinata's mother, who often reprimands Miyako for her shut-in behavior. She is often shown with a cigarette with nicotine filter in her mouth.
Haruka Shirosaki (白咲 春香, Shirosaki Haruka)
Voiced by: Ayumi Fujimura
Hana's mother.
Emily Himesaka (姫坂 エミリー, Himesaka Emirī)
Voiced by: Aki Toyosaki
Noa's mother. The one who rubs the complex on her daughter.
Yuu Matsumoto (松本 友奈, Matsumoto Yuuna)
Voiced by: Hina Kino
Koko's younger sister. She has a pet dog named Miyako.

== Media ==
=== Manga ===
Nanatsu Mukunoki launched the four-panel manga in Ichijinsha's Comic Yuri Hime magazine on November 18, 2016. It ended serialization on April 17, 2025. Sixteen tankōbon volumes have been released as of May 29, 2025.

No.	Japanese release date	Japanese ISBN
1	May 18, 2017	978-4-75-807672-2
2	November 16, 2017	978-4-75-807755-2
3	June 15, 2018	978-4-75-807819-1
4	November 15, 2018	978-4-75-807875-7
5	January 11, 2019	978-4-75-807896-2; 9784758078979 (SE)
6	June 18, 2019	978-4-75-807952-5
7	January 31, 2020	978-4-75-802078-7; 978-4-75-802079-4 (SE)
8	September 18, 2020	978-4-75-802156-2; 978-4-75-802157-9 (SE)
9	February 18, 2021	978-4-75-802215-6; 978-4-75-802216-3 (SE)
10	October 18, 2021	978-4-75-802306-1; 978-4-75-802307-8 (SE)
11	June 17, 2022	978-4-75-802424-2; 978-4-75-802425-9 (SE)
12	October 14, 2022	978-4-75-802460-0; 978-4-75-802461-7 (SE)
13	July 18, 2023	978-4-75-8025799; 978-4-75-802580-5 (SE)
14	February 17, 2024	978-4-75-802657-4; 978-4-75-802658-1 (SE)
15	September 28, 2024	978-4-75-802769-4; 978-4-75-802770-0 (SE)
16	May 29, 2025	978-4-75-802901-8; 978-4-75-802902-5 (SE)

=== Anime ===
An anime television series adaptation was announced in the third volume of the manga on June 15, 2018. The series is directed by Daisuke Hiramaki and written by Yuka Yamada, with animation by studio Doga Kobo and character designs by Hiromi Nakagawa. Takurō Iga is composing the series' music. The series aired on Tokyo MX and other channels between January 8 and March 26, 2019, and was simulcast by Crunchyroll. The opening and ending themes respectively are "Kimama na Tenshi-tachi" (気ままな天使たち, Carefree Angels) and "Happy Happy Friends" (ハッピー・ハッピー・フレンズ, Happī Happī Furenzu), both performed by WATATEN☆5 (Maria Sashide, Rika Nagae, Akari Kitō, Hitomi Ōwada, and Naomi Ōzora). The series aired for 12 episodes. An OVA episode was bundled with the series' third Blu-ray volume on May 24, 2019, and was streamed on Crunchyroll.

==== Episodes ====
No.	Title (Note: All English titles are taken from Crunchyroll.)	Original release date
1	"A Funny, Squirmy Feeling" "Monyottoshita Kimochi" (もにょっとした気持ち)	January 8, 2019
Miyako Hoshino, a college student who is shy with strangers, becomes oddly smitten when her little sister Hinata brings home her classmate Hana Shirosaki, but doesn't make the best first impression with her. When Hana returns for a sleepover, Miyako has Hana dress up in cosplay outfits she made, offering to treat her to as many sweets as she wants if she keeps doing so. The next day, as Miyako secretly tries on her cosplay herself, she is spotted by her new next door neighbor, Noa Himesaka.
2	"Incontestably Cute" "Saikyou ni Kawaii" (サイキョーにカワイイ)	January 15, 2019
Noa, who had transferred into Hinata's class, comes over to tease Miyako about her cosplay, but becomes disheartened when Miyako finds Hana cuter than she is. Noa holds a cosplay contest to prove she's the cutest, only to end up in last place due to Miyako's judging preferences. Later, Miyako gets wrapped up in a game of hide-and-seek with the others and ends up hiding with Hana. The next day, Noa holds another contest to see who can take the cutest photo of her.
3	"Imprinting" "Surikomi" (刷り込み)	January 22, 2019
As part of their class project, Hinata, Hana, and Noa make a board game where Miyako has to do whatever actions the players land on as a means to help her overcome her shyness. On another day, after the girls try to get home without stepping into the sunlight, Hinata gets upset with Miyako for paying more attention to the others than her, so Miyako spends the evening spoiling her to make it up to her.
4	"Can We Speak For a Moment?" "Chotto Ohanashi Yoroshii desu ka?" (ちょっとお話よろしいですか?)	January 29, 2019
After playing in an inflatable pool, the girls work on clay sculptures for their homework, with Hinata wanting to make a clay version of Miyako. Later, the girls go to a summer festival, where Miyako gets in trouble for taking sneak pictures of Hana.
5	"Don't Worry! Leave it to Me!" "Iikara Watashi ni Makasenasai!" (いいから私にまかせなさい!)	February 5, 2019
The girls are tasked with making cookies with their classmates Koyori Tanemura and Kanon Konomori, with Koyori becoming so annoyed with everyone relying on Kanon that she decides to make her own cookies with Hana, which proves disastrous. After school, Koyori and Kanon come over to meet Miyako, who tries to look like the amazing person she's been built up to be, but can't keep up the illusion for very long. The next day, Koyori ties up Kanon's hands with rope so that people will rely on her instead, only to find she can't untie her.
6	"Mya-Nee Doesn't Have Any Friends" "Myā-Nee ni Tomodachi wa Inai zo" (みゃー姉に友だちはいないぞ)	February 12, 2019
Hana and the others decide to follow Miyako to her university, where one of the students shows them around the campus while they wait for her classes to finish. On the way back, the girls find that the girl from earlier, Koko Matsumoto, is actually someone who has been stalking Miyako since high school. The next day, Koko shows up at Miyako's house, where she bonds with Hinata and dresses Miyako up in a maid outfit she made herself. Miyako then meets Hana and Noa's mothers, Haruka and Emily, who give their thanks for looking after their daughters.
7	"I Don't Understand What Mya-Nee is Saying" "Myā-Nee ga Nani Itteruka Wakannai" (みゃー姉が何いってるかわかんない)	February 19, 2019
After Hinata comes down with a cold, Miyako takes the day off of university to look after her. On Miyako's birthday, Hinata and the others give her "I'll Do Anything" tickets while Hana gets her a hairpin. When Hinata proves to be too clingy, Miyako uses one of her tickets to forbid Hinata from coming close to her for five days, leading Noa to act as a substitute for her.
8	"Sometimes Ignorance is Bliss" "Shiranai Hō ga Shiawase na Kototte Aru yo" (知らないほうが幸せなことってあるよ)	February 26, 2019
Miyako's mother Chizuru sends her and Hinata to the mall to buy some new clothes, with proves to be an impossible task due to Miyako's shyness. Opting to buy fabric instead, Miyako spends the rest of the time playing with Hinata. Later, Hana and Noa, who are on their own shopping trip, come across Koko's pet dog, also named Miyako, while Miyako herself runs into her younger sister, Yuu.
9	"Please Stay Until I Fall Asleep" "Watashi ga Neru made Ite Kudasai ne" (私が寝るまでいてくださいね)	March 5, 2019
Noa goes to see a movie with Hinata, who buys her a hairband as thanks. Later, Chizuru shows the girls a photo album of Miyako as a kid and lets them try on her old school uniform. During a sleepover, Hana gets scared after seeing a scary movie and asks Miyako to stay with her until she falls asleep.
10	"I Said Too Much Again" "Mata Yokei na Koto Icchatta" (また余計なこと言っちゃった)	March 12, 2019
While giving the girls different hairstyles, Miyako becomes curious as to why she treats Hana differently from anyone else. On another day, Miyako goes out to buy cream puffs with Hana, wearing an outfit she received from Koko. Later, Hana is chosen as the lead for the upcoming school play.
11	"In Short, It's Your Fault, Onee-san" "Tsumari Onee-san no Sei desu" (つまりお姉さんのせいです)	March 19, 2019
When Hinata's class needs costumes for their school play, Miyako supervises the girls as they make the costumes themselves. On the day of the culture festival, Miyako goes on a stamp rally with the girls, culminating in escorting Hana through a haunted house run by their parents. Afterwards, it is time for the girls' play.
12	"Angel's Gaze" "Tenshi no Manazashi" (天使のまなざし)	March 26, 2019
The girls perform their school play, where Hana plays an angel who falls in love with a human and becomes a human herself to be with her, only to meet her granddaughter. After the play, all the students gives Miyako their thanks for helping with the costumes, after which Hana gives her own thanks to Miyako for trying so hard for her sake.
OVA	"You Never Let Us Down" "Kitai o Uragiranai ne" (期待を裏切らないね)	May 24, 2019
OVA	"Always Growing Closer" "Tsune ni Yori Soi" (常に寄り添い)	May 24, 2019
OVA	"Let's Change You Into This!" "Kore ni Kigaemashou!" (これに着替えましょう！)	May 24, 2019
OVA	"I'm Your Big Sister" "Watashi ga Onee-chan da yo" (私がお姉ちゃんだよ)	May 24, 2019
The girls go camping at the lake for their vacation, bringing a reluctant Miyako with them. Koko recalls her friendship with Miyako, through rose-tinted goggles, of course. During Halloween, Miyako anticipates what costume Hana will be wearing, only to end up having to cosplay herself for Koko and Yuu. Miyako recalls when Hinata was born, quickly bonding as sisters.

=== Film ===
A new anime project was announced on November 23, 2020. It was later announced that the project would be a new film that would premiere in theaters. The main cast and staff are reprising their roles. The film, titled Wataten!: An Angel Flew Down to Me: Precious Friends (私に天使が舞い降りた！プレシャス・フレンズ, Watashi ni Tenshi ga Maiorita! Pureshasu Furenzu), premiered on October 14, 2022. The opening theme is "Precious Friends" (プレシャス・フレンズ, Pureshasu Furenzu) while the ending theme is "Zutto... Zutto..." (ずっと…ずっと…, Always... Always...), both performed by WATATEN☆5.

No.	Title	Original release date
Movie	"Wataten!: An Angel Flew Down to Me: Precious Friends" "Watashi ni Tenshi ga Maiorita! Pureshasu Furenzu" (私に天使が舞い降りた！プレシャス・フレンズ)	October 14, 2022
All of the girls, Miyako included, go on a trip to the mountains to visit Hana's grandmother, Sakura. As the girls enjoy the various sights and sounds of the area, Sakura reveals she was only pretending to be good at cooking because she was jealous of how much Hana was enjoying Miyako's sweets. While visiting a festival the next day, Hana loses a hairclip given to her by Sakura, prompting Miyako to stay behind with Hana to search for it. After finding the hairpin, as Sakura reminisces with her old friend Macchi, Hana takes Miyako to a mountain stream to watch some fireflies.

== Music ==
Opening Theme

- Kimama na Tenshi-tachi by WATATEN☆5 (Maria Sashide, Rika Nagae, Akari Kitō, Hitomi Ōwada, Naomi Ōzora) (TV)
- Precious Friends! by WATATEN☆5 (Movie)

Ending Theme

- Happy Happy Friends by WATATEN☆5 (TV)

Insert Song

- Tenshi no Manazashi Prologue by Rika Nagae, Akari Kitō, Hitomi Ōwada & Naomi Ōzora (Episode 12)
- Watashi o Yobu Koe by Maria Sashide, Hitomi Ōwada & Naomi Ōzora (Episode 12)
- Yōkoso, Tenshi no Kuni e by Hitomi Ōwada & Naomi Ōzora (Episode 12)

== Reception ==
The anime series' first episode garnered poor reviews from Anime News Network's staff during the Winter 2019 season previews. Paul Jensen commended the production for having strong animation and delivering on some decent humor but felt wary of the script's unsavory content being given those highlights. Theron Martin saw the technical aspects as "run-of-the-mill" by Doga Kobo's standards and felt some trepidation in the premise toeing the line between innocent and creepy in its presentation, concluding that there's mild entertainment to be found but will not be for everyone. Despite finding a few laughs, Rebecca Silverman was immediately disgusted over Miyako's infatuation with Hana and the uncomfortable vibe it gives off, concluding that it will only cater to "a very specific niche audience" beyond the typical all-girl slice-of-life fanbase. Nick Creamer criticized the first half for framing Miyako's attraction like a "shoujo romance" with a predatory-like gaze but gave credit to the second half for showing Hana's viewpoint of the situation and coupling it with fluid animation, expressive character designs and snappy comedic delivery, concluding that "WATATEN! is a reasonably executed premiere, but I'll be happier if Doga Kobo gets through this "profoundly predatory romance" phase."

Gadget Tsūshin listed the first episode's title in their 2019 anime buzzwords list.
