= Laid-Back Camp (2018 soundtrack) =

Laid-Back Camp Original Soundtrack

Soundtrack album by Akiyuki Tateyama
- Released: March 21, 2018
- Studio: Daikanyama Mages. Studio (Tokyo)
- Length: 95:37
- Language: Japanese
- Label: 5pb. Records

Akiyuki Tateyama chronology
Fushigi Na Tabi Wa Tsuzukunosa (2018)	Laid-Back Camp Original Soundtrack (2018)	Wake Up, Best! 3 (2018)

Laid-Back Camp Original Soundtrack is the soundtrack album of C-Station's Laid-Back Camp (2018). It was published in Japan by 5pb. on March 21, 2018.

== Background ==
Akiyuki Tateyama served as the composer for the first season of Laid-Back Camp. He composed the music characterizing the campsites based on photographs shown to him by director Yoshiaki Kyōgoku since the latter wanted the music to match a specific scenery rather than the characters. Tateyama cited acoustic guitar, banjo, and mandolin as one of the instruments he used in composing the soundtracks. For Rin Shima's theme, he used mandolin since he found its tone fitting with the character's personality and behavior.

== Track listing ==
All music is composed by Tateyama, except where indicated. Excluded from the list are the audio dramas written by Jin Tanaka, with Yumiri Hanamori and Nao Tōyama reprising their respective voice roles as Nadeshiko Kagamihara and Shima.

Disc One
No.	Title	Composer(s)	Length
1.	"Yuru Camp△Theme"		2:13
2.	"Shiny Days (TV Size)"	Sho Aratame	1:34
3.	"Campsite Theme ~Lake Motosu~"		5:48
4.	"Field Time (Chit-Chat!)"		1:59
5.	"Solo Camp△Recommendation"		2:13
6.	"Laid-Back Time"		2:15
7.	"Campsite Theme ~Fumoto~"		5:41
8.	"Conversations and Mugs"		1:53
9.	"Going My Way"		1:49
10.	"Deep Breath at Dawn"		2:29
11.	"Wakupara!"		2:17
12.	"Campsite Theme ~Takabocchi, Eastwood~"		6:37
13.	"Field Time (Chat...)"		1:48
14.	"Going Your Way"		1:47
15.	"Laid-Back Rules"		2:14
16.	"I Knew It"		1:49
17.	"Fuyu Biyori (Hikigatari ver.)"	Eri Sasaki; Hero Nakamura	1:31
Total length:			45:47

Disc Two
No.	Title	Composer(s)	Length
1.	"Campsite Theme ~Shibire Lake~"		5:33
2.	"Let's Go Camping!"		3:13
3.	"Fuji River Hymn"		2:07
4.	"Strange Blue"		2:04
5.	"Field Time (Chit-Chat Chit-Chat!)"		1:53
6.	"Herorinpa"		2:00
7.	"Campsite Theme ~Mount Jimbagata~"		6:33
8.	"Let's Dance to that Folk Dance"		2:35
9.	"Unchiku Kanchiku"		1:53
10.	"Little Cruise"		2:40
11.	"Hatena no Na?"		2:08
12.	"Campsite Theme ~Asagiri Plateau~"		7:25
13.	"Fuyu Biyori"	Eri Sasaki; Hero Nakamura	1:34
14.	"A Single Sigh"		0:36
15.	"Bumpy"		0:39
16.	"Frenzy"		0:36
17.	"Happening"		0:43
18.	"Mushrooms"		0:44
19.	"Nankoku Fantasy"		1:46
20.	"Banzai Summit"		0:51
21.	"Camping in Possible"		1:21
22.	"Nadeshiko is Speechless"		0:22
23.	"The Shimarin Dango Theme"		0:19
Total length:			49:35

== Chart ==
Year	Chart	Peak position
2018	Japan Oricon Albums Chart (Oricon)	9
