= Laid-Back Camp Movie =

2022 Japanese animated film by Yoshiaki Kyogoku

- Theatrical release poster
- Kanji: 映画 ゆるキャン△
- Revised Hepburn: Eiga Yurukyan
- Directed by: Yoshiaki Kyogoku
- Screenplay by: Jin Tanaka; Mutsumi Ito
- Based on: Laid-Back Camp by Afro
- Produced by: Kanako Ayano; Yūki Kuroda; Shota Watase; Tomoyuki Ōwada; Satoru Shimosato; Yō Okumura; Fumihiro Ozawa; Yuri Koenuma; Mimai Sawai
- Starring: Yumiri Hanamori; Nao Tōyama; Sayuri Hara; Aki Toyosaki; Rie Takahashi; Tomoyo Kurosawa; Marina Inoue; Shizuka Itō; Risae Matsuda; Akio Otsuka
- Cinematography: Hiroaki Tanaka
- Music by: Akiyuki Tateyama
- Production company: C-Station
- Distributed by: Shochiku
- Release dates: June 19, 2022 (Tokyo); July 1, 2022 (Japan)
- Running time: 120 minutes
- Country: Japan
- Language: Japanese
- Box office: US$8.34 million

Laid-Back Camp Movie (Japanese: 映画 ゆるキャン△, Hepburn: Eiga Yurukyan) (Note: Crunchyroll licensed the film under the title Laid-Back Camp: The Movie.) is a 2022 Japanese animated film based on the manga series Laid-Back Camp by Afro. Produced by C-Station and distributed by Shochiku, the film is directed by Yoshiaki Kyogoku from an original story written by Jin Tanaka and Mutsumi Ito. In the film, a grown-up Nadeshiko Kagamihara, Rin Shima, Chiaki Ōgaki, Aoi Inuyama, and Ena Saitō reunite to build a campsite.

The film was included in a project pitched by producer Shōichi Hotta to animation producer Ryoji Maru after accepting it from FuRyu. The film was announced in October 2018, with Kyogoku, Tanaka, Ito, and character designer Mutsumi Sasaki confirming their return from two seasons of Laid-Back Camp in April 2021. Yumiri Hanamori, Nao Tōyama, Sayuri Hara, Aki Toyosaki, and Rie Takahashi were confirmed in October 2021 to be reprising their voice roles from the anime television series, with their characters going to be matured in the film. Additional staff and cast for the film were revealed in March and June 2022, respectively.

Laid-Back Camp Movie had a screening in Tokyo on June 19, 2022, and was released in Japan on July 1. The film grossed over $8 million worldwide.

== Plot ==
High school students Nadeshiko Kagamihara, Rin Shima, Chiaki Ōgaki, Aoi Inuyama, and Ena Saitō, along with the Outdoor Activities Club adviser Minami Toba and Ena's pet dog Chikuwa, go on camping at New Year's Eve, during which they discuss camping again in the future as adults. Years later, Rin, a magazine editor in Nagoya, is visited by Chiaki, who has begun working at Yamanashi Prefecture's tourism promotion organization recently. While in an izakaya, Chiaki mentions working on a redevelopment plan for an abandoned facility in the prefecture when Rin suddenly suggests building a campsite on its vast space. Chiaki then drags Rin to Fujikawa, where they visit the abandoned Fuji River Youth Nature Center. Nadeshiko arrives from Tokyo after receiving a message from Chiaki inviting her, Aoi, and Ena to meet up there. Following a crab hot pot at Nadeshiko's house and Aoi's arrival, Chiaki reveals her plan to build a campsite and assigns everyone's role, including Ena who is not present due to her work.

They begin to cut overgrown grasses and branches on the campground. At the end of that day, they lay out the features to be built and discuss their campsite's concept. Rin offers help in collecting ideas since she is going to visit the campsites that she visited during high school as part of her magazine. Afterward, Chiaki gets the green light from her supervisor to begin her campsite project. They celebrate the year-end holiday first before starting the project next year. Resuming the campsite building the following year, Chiaki reveals that the deadline to finish the project is about six months. The following week, Nadeshiko and Chiaki respectively bring an excavator and a mower to hasten their work. After renovating the facility, Rin, Nadeshiko, Chiaki, Aoi, and Ena go on camping there for a trial. Chikuwa later presents to the group a mysterious shrapnel that it has dug.

After their trial camping, Chiaki informs the group that an investigation is set to take place on the campsite due to the shrapnel being connected to buried earthenware found in the prefecture. Sometime later, she informs the group that the prefecture has decided to suspend their project to turn the facility into an archaeological site. They later decide to rework their campsite project by incorporating the archaeological site to it as an attraction to campers, resulting in approval from the prefecture. Sometime later, the campsite, now named Fujikawa Matsubokkuri Camp Base, has been opened. On its opening day, the visitors get lost on their way to the campsite due to missing direction signs, prompting Rin to guide them with her old Vino scooter. With the visitors enjoying the campsite, the group decides to hold another New Year's Eve camping.

== Voice cast ==
- Yumiri Hanamori as Nadeshiko Kagamihara: A young woman who works at an outdoor goods store in Tokyo.
- Nao Tōyama as Rin Shima: A young woman who works as an editor of a town information magazine at a publishing company in Nagoya after getting promoted from the sales department.
- Sayuri Hara as Chiaki Ōgaki: A young woman who works at the tourism promotion organization of Yamanashi Prefecture after working with event organizers in Tokyo.
- Aki Toyosaki as Aoi Inuyama: A young woman who works as an elementary school teacher in Yamanashi.
- Rie Takahashi as Ena Saitō: A young woman who works as a trimmer at a pet salon in Yokohama. Her pet dog, Chikuwa, is being taken care of by her parents in Yamanashi.
- Kentarō Tone as Kariya
- Yutaka Aoyama as Editor-in-chief
- Natsu Yorita as Komaki
- Yōji Ueda as Shirakawa
- Yōhei Tadano as Okazaki
- Marina Inoue as Sakura Kagamihara
- Shintarō Ōhata as Shūichirō Kagamihara
- Nozomi Yamamoto as Shizuka Kagamihara
- Takahiro Sakurai as Wataru Shima
- Kaori Mizuhashi as Saki Shima
- Shizuka Itō as Minami Toba
- Tomoyo Kurosawa as Ayano Toki
- Risae Matsuda as Akari Inuyama
- Akio Otsuka as Hajime Shinshiro and narrator

== Production ==
=== Development ===
Producer Shōichi Hotta approached animation producer Ryoji Maru with a "big new" project, which included a film, after accepting an offer from FuRyu in July 2018 to lead a sequel project for the first season of Laid-Back Camp. In October 2018, the film was announced at the Yuru Camp Secret Society Blanket Enrollment Explanation Meeting event in Saitama Prefecture. In April 2021, it was announced that C-Station would return to produce the film from the series, with Shochiku serving as the distributor. Rie Takahashi, the voice actress for Ena Saitō in two seasons of the anime series, confirmed on her Twitter account that the announcement of the film's release date on April Fool's Day was "not a joke". Including in the announcement was a concept visual from a storyboard drawn by director Yoshiaki Kyogoku, which shows a matured Nadeshiko Kagamihara and Rin Shima and a catchphrase saying, "I am from now on." (これからも、わたしだ。, Korekara mo, watashida.)

=== Pre-production ===
In April 2021, staff from two seasons of Laid-Back Camp were confirmed to be returning for the film, including Kyogoku as the director, Jin Tanaka and Mutsumi Ito as scriptwriters, and Mutsumi Sasaki as the character designer. This is Kyogoku's first anime film that he has directed. In October 2021, Yumiri Hanamori, Nao Tōyama, Sayuri Hara, Aki Toyosaki, and Takahashi were announced to be reprising their respective voice roles from the anime series as Nadeshiko, Rin, Chiaki Ōgaki, Aoi Inuyama, and Ena. Laid-Back Camp manga creator Afro hinted that the characters are a "little bit older" in the film. He also revealed that the script, settings, and other aspects of the film were created from scratch as Kyogoku and his team collaborated with him in every step of its production.

Kyogoku wanted "to see more of the five [characters] [as adults]" after a brief scene in the final episode of the anime series' first season in which Nadeshiko imagines the five of them as adults. He originally planned for them "to have a campsite on a slightly larger scale, or to have a campsite in a different location", but he ended up with the idea of "build[ing] a campsite" since "it was something that only adults could do". One of the campsites facilitated by Minobu Nature Village (みのぶ自然の里, Minobu Shizen no Sato) was used as a filming location. According to Hanamori, the film takes place 10 years after the events of her character's high school years, while Kyogoku stated that her character's age is in the "mid-20s".

=== Post-production ===
The logo of Laid-Back Camp Movie was revealed in March 2022. In the same month, additional staff for the film were revealed, including Miho Imoto and Noriko Tsutsumiya as prop designers, Yoshimi Umino as the art director, Hiroaki Tanaka as the cinematographer, and Takeshi Takadera as the sound director. Additional cast for the film were revealed in June 2022, including Tomoyo Kurosawa as Ayano Toki, Shizuka Itō as Minami Toba, Marina Inoue as Sakura Kagamihara, Risae Matsuda as Akari Inuyama, Nozomi Yamamoto as Shizuka Kagamihara, Shintarō Ōhata as Shūichirō Kagamihara, Kaori Mizuhashi as Saki Shima, Takahiro Sakurai as Wataru Shima, Kentarō Tone as Kariya, Yutaka Aoyama as an editor-in-chief, Natsu Yorita as store manager Komaki, and Yōji Ueda as Shirakawa, with Akio Otsuka returning as the narrator.

Tōyama revealed that the film used "movie" (映画, eiga) instead of "the movie" (劇場版, gekijōban) in the title so that viewers could "enjoy the [film] as a stand-alone work, not as a [film] that can only be enjoyed by those who have seen the TV series." Kyogoku also described the film as a "stand-alone film", stating that it was "neither an extension nor an expansion of the TV series." In September 2022, Maru revealed that he made a cameo appearance in the film.

== Music ==
In March 2022, Akiyuki Tateyama was revealed to be composing Laid-Back Camp Movie after previously doing so for the two seasons of Laid-Back Camp anime series and its spin-off Room Camp (2020), while Asaka and Eri Sasaki were also revealed as the performers of the opening theme music, titled "Sun Is Coming Up", and the ending theme music, titled "Mimosa" (ミモザ), respectively. Sasaki came up with the title of the ending theme music when she received a bouquet of mimosa flowers from the owner of her favorite flower shop where they filmed its music video. The original soundtrack and the two theme music were released in Japan by Mages on June 29, 2022.

Laid-Back Camp Movie: Original Soundtrack track listing
No.	Title	Length
1.	"Big Flowers Bloom in the Summer Night Sky"	3:02
2.	"Sun Is Coming Up (Movie Edit)"	1:38
3.	"Solo Camp Girl = Office Girl"	2:30
4.	"This Is My New World"	2:58
5.	"Memories of the Lantern"	0:23
6.	"Relax per Person"	0:57
7.	"Sashi Drink, Chicken Wings, and Reunion."	2:31
8.	"Pine Cone Suite ~Silence and Twilight~"	2:41
9.	"Pine Cone Suite ~Hinode Zuru-sato~"	2:55
10.	"I'm Coming!"	0:40
11.	"Grant the Title"	2:12
12.	"It Looks Fun and It Feels Good"	0:57
13.	"Senpai's Help Boat"	0:28
14.	"It's Like When I Was in High School"	1:24
15.	"Pine Cone Suite ~Start Building the Campsite!~"	2:12
16.	"Pine Cone Suite ~Mowing and Hot Lemons~"	2:29
17.	"Touring the Nostalgic Campsite"	2:21
18.	"Concept Required"	2:01
19.	"First Snowfall of the Year"	1:15
20.	"Pine Cone Suite ~Dynamism of Excavator~"	2:43
21.	"Objects from the Forest X"	1:00
22.	"Test Camp at Yororeich"	1:56
23.	"Cooking"	1:05
24.	"Bon Appetite! Camp Meal"	1:20
25.	"Full? There's Another Plate!"	1:05
26.	"Starry Sky Alone"	1:51
27.	"Pending Commotion"	2:14
28.	"Suspension"	0:57
29.	"I'm So Lonely, It's a Lie"	1:40
30.	"Things I Really Wanted to Do"	1:11
31.	"Tsuka-Tsuka-Tsukapong"	1:27
32.	"Snow Road and Eisen"	2:50
33.	"Secret Hot Spring in the Sky 2150"	0:29
34.	"What We Can Do Now"	2:39
35.	"It's Like Club Activities"	0:48
36.	"Pine Cone Suite ~Rise Up and Challenge Again!~"	2:14
37.	"Sustainable Plan"	1:52
38.	"Pine Cone Suite ~Summer Sky and Big Plan~"	2:37
39.	"Pine Cone Suite ~Completion Fanfare~"	0:42
40.	"Trouble"	0:47
41.	"Emergency Dispatch 24 Hours! Solo Camping Girl on a Light Blue Motorcycle"	1:38
42.	"Pine Cone Suite ~Connected at This Place~"	2:06
43.	"Mimosa (Movie Edit)"	4:31
Total length:		77:16

== Marketing ==
A teaser visual for Laid-Back Camp Movie was released in October 2021. A commercial video for the film was released in January 2022. A series of "candid photo visuals" that features the daily lives of each of the characters began releasing that year, starting with Nadeshiko and Rin in January, Chiaki and Aoi in February, and Ena in March. A teaser trailer and the second teaser visual for the film were released in March 2022. The main visual for the film was released in May 2022. Additionally, Volume 13.5 of Laid-Back Camp manga series, which includes a 24-page manga illustrated by Afro titled "Rin and Nadeshiko Go Spring Camping at Lake Inaga" (リンとなでしこの伊奈ヶ湖春キャンプ, Rin to Nadeshiko no Inagako Harukyan), the original character designs by Afro for the film, a "memorial album" for the anime series, and a cover illustrated by Afro, was announced as a bonus book for filmgoers during the film's premiere in Japan. A new trailer for the film was released in June 2022. A pop-up kitchen car to promote the film began its tour in Hokkaido on June 19, 2022, and concluded in Yamanashi on July 18.

Promotional partners for the film included Animate; Lawson; the Japanese credit card company Epos Card; Shimobe Roadside Station, a roadside station in Minobu; the Fujinokuni Camping Car & Outdoor Show, an outdoor event by the Japan Recreational Vehicle Association for campers; the Japanese shopping center Ario via their branch in Hashimoto, Sagamihara; Nissin Foods; Homestar, the home edition of Megastar planetarium projector by Sega; Mori Park Outdoor Village in Akishima; the Japanese streetwear brand Zozotown; Fuji Kyuko; and the Japan Weather Association.

== Release ==
=== Theatrical ===
Laid-Back Camp Movie had an early screening in Shinjuku Piccadilly theater in Tokyo on June 19, 2022, and was released in 121 theaters in Japan on July 1, with additional 26 theaters added on August 26. The Dolby Cinema version of the film was screened in seven theaters on September 30, 2022. Crunchyroll held the American premiere of the film at Anime NYC on November 18, 2022.

=== Home media ===
Laid-Back Camp Movie was released on Amazon Prime Video in Japan on November 4, 2022. Crunchyroll began streaming the film on November 24, 2022. The film was released on Blu-ray and DVD in Japan on April 26, 2023. The features of the Blu-ray's collector's edition include a 100-page booklet and a 120-minute behind-the-scenes of the film.

== Reception ==
=== Box office ===
Laid-Back Camp Movie grossed $8.24 million in Japan and $102,251 in South Korea, for a worldwide total of $8.34 million. The film is the thirteenth highest-grossing anime film and the thirty-ninth-overall highest grossing film of 2022 in Japan.

The film grossed ¥351.4 million ($2.59 million) in its opening weekend, ranking third place behind Lightyear (2022) at the Japanese box office. In its second weekend, the film dropped to sixth place after earning ¥121 million ($881,400). The film earned ¥70.5 million ($509,000) in its third weekend, ranking down to eighth at the box office, and ¥33.99 million ($249,100) in its fourth weekend, ranking down to tenth. It reached the one-billion-yen box office in its eighth weekend, becoming the seventh Japanese animated film of 2022 to do so.

=== Critical response ===
The Japanese review and survey firm Filmarks placed Laid-Back Camp Movie third in their first-day satisfaction ranking, with an average rating of 4.02/5, based on 997 reviews.

Hinataka of Netorabo praised the film for its "carefully spun" story, "funny and comedic" elements, the production that "looks great on the theater screen", and depiction of a working adult setting. Giving the film 4 out of 5 stars for the South China Morning Post, James Marsh felt that "there is something undeniably soothing about the entire experience, a downshift into a serene state of static existence that proves an undeniably gratifying escape from the daily grind." He noted the film might be a "hard sell" to first-time viewers since nothing major happened in the story, except for anything related to camping. Writing for Crunchyroll, Alicia Haddick felt the film was "accessible to newcomers and long-term fans alike, with a genuinely touching message about reconnecting with your passions and never losing sight of what you love." She found Rin and Nadeshiko had the "most time to grow" in the film and the supporting cast being "pushed aside". Kim Morrissy of Anime News Network graded the film "B", feeling that it "serves up an extra generous helping of mellow adventures with this two-hour installment, which is great for anyone who wants to see more of the characters, although it might also perhaps be too much of a good thing." Morrissy praised the "[n]uanced and understated writing and presentation" and how the film explored the responsibilities of being an adult, while criticized the long runtime for a simple plot.

=== Accolades ===
In December 2022, Laid-Back Camp Movie placed fifth among the top 20 Japanese animated films voted by fans to win the Anime of the Year at Tokyo Anime Award Festival 2023. That month, Animate Times ranked the film 18th on their poll for the top 20 animated films of 2022.

== Guide books ==
Yaesu Publishing released the guide book Yuru Camp Movie: Holy Land Pilgrimage Drive & Touring Guide (映画 ゆるキャン△ 聖地巡礼ドライブ&ツーリングガイド) in Japan in January 2023. It contains driving and touring guide to locations depicted in Laid-Back Camp Movie, as well as the featured camping gears and cooking recipes. The official guide book of the film, titled Yuru Camp Movie Official Guidebook: Coverage Record of the Campsite (映画 ゆるキャン△ 公式ガイドブック キャンプ場取材記録), was released by Houbunsha in Japan on April 12, 2023. It contains interviews with the cast and staff of the film, synopsis, character descriptions, and valuable setting materials.
