= Laid-Back Camp (TV series) =

Japanese television series

- Title card seen in the first season
- Kanji: ゆるキャン△
- Revised Hepburn: Yurukyan
- Genre: Drama
- Based on: Laid-Back Camp by Afro
- Screenplay by: Ayako Kitagawa
- Directed by: Takashi Ninomiya; Mamoru Koshino; Kyōhei Tamazawa
- Starring: Haruka Fukuhara; Yūno Ōhara; Momoko Tanabe; Yumena Yanai; Sara Shida; Yurina Yanagi; Kaho Tsuchimura
- Opening theme: "Without Blinking" by H△G (season 1); "Hello Youth" by Longman (season 2)
- Ending theme: "Replay" by Longman (season 1); "Please Don't Forget" by Sarasa Kadowaki (season 2)
- Composer: Dai Odagiri
- Country of origin: Japan
- Original language: Japanese
- No. of seasons: 2
- No. of episodes: 24

Production
- Producers: Shinya Fujino; Kiichi Kumagai; Tatsuya Iwakura; Tomohiro Goda
- Cinematography: Shinji Suzuki
- Editor: Norihisa Yamada
- Running time: 24 minutes
- Production companies: TV Tokyo; SDP; Headquarters

Original release
- Network: TV Tokyo; TV Osaka; TV Aichi
- Release: January 10, 2020 – June 18, 2021

Related
- Laid-Back Camp

Laid-Back Camp (Japanese: ゆるキャン△, Hepburn: Yurukyan) is a Japanese drama television series based on the manga of the same name written and illustrated by Afro. Produced by TV Tokyo, SDP, and Headquarters, the series is directed by Takashi Ninomiya, Mamoru Koshino, and Kyōhei Tamazawa from a script written by Ayako Kitagawa. It follows Rin Shima encountering Nadeshiko Kagamihara for the first time while camping at Lake Motosu.

The series stars Haruka Fukuhara, Yūno Ōhara, Momoko Tanabe, Yumena Yanai, Sara Shida, Yurina Yanagi, and Kaho Tsuchimura as Rin Shima, Nadeshiko Kagamihara, Chiaki Ōgaki, Aoi Inuyama, Ena Saitō, Sakura Kagamihara, and Minami Toba, respectively. A live-action adaptation of the manga series for television was announced in November 2019 and was given a second season renewal in November 2020.

The series premiered in Japan on TV Tokyo, TV Osaka, and TV Aichi on January 10, 2020, and concluded on June 18, 2021, with 24 episodes broadcast over two seasons. Ahead of the premiere of the second season is a special program for the series, which was aired on March 29, 2021.

== Episodes ==
=== Season 1 (2020) ===
No.	Directed by	Written by	Original release date
1	Takashi Ninomiya	Ayako Kitagawa	January 10, 2020
While biking to a campsite at Lake Motosu, Rin Shima finds a sleeping girl by the roadside toilet. Later that night, the girl seeks help from Rin, explaining that she recently moved to Yamanashi and also biked on her way to see Mount Fuji. Inviting her over to the camp and cooking her a curry-flavored instant ramen, Rin helps the girl to contact her older sister. After she was picked up by her sister, the girl introduces herself as Nadeshiko Kagamihara. The following day, the two unknowingly cross paths with each other in the same high school.
2	Takashi Ninomiya	Ayako Kitagawa	January 17, 2020
Nadeshiko finds the Outdoor Activities Club and meets its members Chiaki Ōgaki and Aoi Inuyama. Chiaki initially hesitates to accept Nadeshiko's membership due to their clubroom's small size but later welcomes her to have the room upgraded. They later assemble a tent at the schoolyard, catching the attention of Rin and Ena Saitō inside the library. With Rin's suggestion, Ena helps the Outdoor Activities Club fix the broken tent pole. Nadeshiko reunites with Rin and invites her to the club, but the latter shows hesitation. Sometime later, Rin camps at Fumoto Campsite when Nadeshiko joins her after Ena told her about the camping.
3	Takashi Ninomiya	Ayako Kitagawa	January 24, 2020
Nadeshiko cooks a gyoza hot pot for the dinner with Rin. Rin later apologizes to Nadeshiko for being cold towards her when invited to join the club. Nadeshiko understands her desire to do solo camping but still invites her to try camping with others. The following day, Nadeshiko watches the sunrise behind Mount Fuji. Sometime later, Rin plans to visit Nagano.
4	Mamoru Yoshino	Ayako Kitagawa	January 31, 2020
The Outdoor Activities Club prepares for their first winter camping. Sometime later, Rin heads off riding a Vino scooter to Nagano and later stops by a store in Kirigamine to eat borscht, while the Outdoor Activities Club begins trekking their campsite and later stops by Fuefukigawa Fruit Park to eat ice cream. As they visit the Hottarakashi Onsen, the Outdoor Activities Club receives a message from Rin waving at a street's live camera.
5	Mamoru Yoshino	Ayako Kitagawa	February 7, 2020
After taking a hot spring bath, the Outdoor Activities Club eats a fried soft-boiled egg and falls asleep. Meanwhile, Rin travels to Takabocchi Highlands and plans to visit a hot spring as well, only to find it closed. She reaches a place at Mount Takabocchi for her camping and prepares soup-style pasta. Meanwhile, the Outdoor Activities Club arrives late at Pinewood Campgrounds. Nadeshiko cooks stewed curry for the dinner. Later that night, Nadeshiko and Rin send images of the city night lights of their respective locations.
6	Kyōhei Tamazawa	Ayako Kitagawa	February 14, 2020
Rin receives a compact campfire grill and daydreams with Ena on what meat to grill. Upon receiving a souvenir from Nagano, Nadeshiko invites Rin for a yakiniku camping. With Nadeshiko's older sister Sakura driving, they arrive at a campsite at Lake Shibireko after doing grocery shopping in Selva Food Market where Aoi works part-time. While walking toward the camp, Rin tells an urban legend of an ox ghost appearing from the lake, frightening Nadeshiko.
7	Kyōhei Tamazawa	Ayako Kitagawa	February 21, 2020
After setting up their camp, Nadeshiko strolls around the campsite, while Rin prepares to light up the charcoals in her grill. Nadeshiko encounters their neighbor pair of campers and takes a picture of their camping equipment. Rin struggles to light up the charcoals, so Nadeshiko calls one of the campers for help. Nadeshiko and Rin enjoy their yakiniku and hot pot soup, with them giving their portion to the siblings and receiving a jambalaya in return. Later night, Rin encounters a silhouette of what she assumes to be the ox ghost, prompting her to run and sleep inside Nadeshiko's tent. It turns out to be one of the campers, who is drunk and still inebriated.
8	Takashi Ninomiya	Ayako Kitagawa	February 28, 2020
On their next camping trip, Nadeshiko suggests a Christmas camping to Chiaki and Aoi, with them later inviting Ena to join them. With Sakura driving, the Outdoor Activities Club visits the Elk outdoor products store, where a gas lantern catches the attention of Nadeshiko, and eats manjū near JR Minobu Station. Nadeshiko then decides to find a job to purchase several camping gears and the gas lantern. Sometime later, Rin travels alone to Nagano after Nadeshiko was unable to join her planned camping at Nanbu due to sickness. Planning to detour, she finds a road at Yashajin Pass closed to private vehicles. Stopping by a trailhead for Mount Hōō, Rin encounters a climber and receives a tea product from her.
9	Mamoru Yoshino	Ayako Kitagawa	March 6, 2020
While at Tsuetsuki Pass, Rin is offered by Nadeshiko to be her navigator, receiving suggestions of places between Ina and Komagane. She later visits Kōzen-ji and takes a hot spring bath and a meal in Komakusa no Yu. Meanwhile, Chiaki visits Nadeshiko and cooks hōtō for her family. Afterward, they begin planning their Christmas camping when Nadeshiko suggests inviting Rin. Later that night, Rin is still at Komakusa after falling asleep and rushes to her campsite, only to find another closed road.
10	Mamoru Yoshino	Ayako Kitagawa	March 13, 2020
Chiaki contacts Rin after learning of her predicament and advises her to ignore the roadblock sign as it might have been forgotten to be removed. Rin manages to arrive at Jimagatayama Campgrounds and prepares a grilled meat bun for her late dinner. Afterward, she receives another call from Chiaki inviting her to the Christmas camp but declines it. With Ena's convincement, Rin tells Chiaki that she will reconsider her invitation. Back at Motosu High School, the Outdoor Activities Club and Ena meet up to prepare for the upcoming Christmas camp when a teacher named Minami Toba notices their camping fire. The Hiking Club adviser, Ōmachi, suggests Minami be the adviser of the Outdoor Activities Club. Nadeshiko then discovers that Minami is the drunkard sister she and Rin had met at Lake Shibireko.
11	Takashi Ninomiya	Ayako Kitagawa	March 20, 2020
Chiaki, Aoi, and Minami arrive at Fujisan YMCA Global Eco Village, the campsite that Rin learned from her grandfather and suggested for their Christmas camping. While Chiaki and Aoi are at Makaino Farm eating ice cream, Rin and Nadeshiko arrive, with Rin cooking s'mores for Nadeshiko. Ena also arrives with her pet dog Chikuwa and lets Nadeshiko play with it. Nadeshiko eventually loses track of Chikuwa and encounters Hiroshi also camping at the site. With everyone gathering and viewing Mount Fuji, Chiaki declines to meet Hiroshi, her idol, to let him enjoy his solo camping, and Minami clarifies to Rin and Nadeshiko that the one who was with her at Lake Shibireko is her little sister instead of what the two assume to be her boyfriend.
12	Takashi Ninomiya	Ayako Kitagawa	March 27, 2020
Aoi prepares Kansai-style sukiyaki for the group's dinner. Meanwhile, Ena offers Nadeshiko a part-time job delivering New Year's cards at the post office where she works. Aoi later prepares tomato sukiyaki. As she is about to cook cheese pasta, their stove runs out of gas, prompting Rin to buy more. The following day, the group enjoys a breakfast meal as they watch the sunrise behind Mount Fuji. Back at Motosu High School, the Outdoor Activities Club discusses their plan to recruit more to expand their clubroom since Ena declined their invitation, while Rin watches them afar in the library. In the epilogue, Rin and Nadeshiko prepare to meet up for camping at Lake Motosu, with the latter showing a gas lantern with her.

=== Laid-Back Camp Special (2021) ===
Directed by	Written by	Original release date
Takashi Ninomiya	Ayako Kitagawa	March 29, 2021
Rin, Nadeshiko, Chiaki, and Ena share their plans during their break from work. A day before the new year, Rin visits Omaezaki to view the ocean near the Omaesaki Lighthouse. Later, she stops by a tea store in Kakegawa and reunites with the climber she first encountered at Yashajin Pass who works there. She suggests Rin visit Fukude Beach to view the first sunrise of the new year. Afterward, Rin visits Mitsuke Tenjin Shrine. She finally settles at a campsite in Iwata and prepares duck soup for her dinner. The following morning, Chiaki, Aoi and her little sister Akari, and Minami visit the summit of Mount Minobu to greet the first sunrise. As the sun rises at their respective locations, Rin, Chiaki, and Aoi greet Nadeshiko, who continues delivering postcards in her part-time job, for a new year. Later, Chiaki suggests seeing the second sunrise behind Mount Fuji from the angle at Takaori in Fujikawa, but they arrive late as the sun has already risen. Meanwhile, Rin receives a call from her mom telling her to stay in Shizuoka for the next two days due to frozen roads on her way home.

=== Season 2 (2021) ===
No.	Directed by	Written by	Original release date
1	Takashi Ninomiya	Ayako Kitagawa	April 2, 2021
During her prolonged stay in Shizuoka, Rin stays in Hamana. The following day, Rin meets with Nadeshiko, who invites her to stay in her grandmother's house in Hamamatsu, and they eat together in an unagi store. Upon reaching the house, Rin encounters Nadeshiko's childhood friend Ayano Toki. Room Camp #1: The Outdoor Activities Club discusses what lies they tell during April Fools' Day.
2	Takashi Ninomiya	Ayako Kitagawa	April 9, 2021
Nadeshiko, Rin, and Ayano bond together. Later night, they visit an observation deck viewing Lake Hamana. Rin shares her thoughts on how camping can also be enjoyed alone, while Ayano understands how the two enjoy camping in winter, promising to visit Yamanashi in summer. Back at Motosu High School, Nadeshiko and Aoi discuss their recent vacations as Chiaki enjoys their souvenirs for her. The Outdoor Activities Club starts its first activity of the year by setting up a hexagon tarp. They later discuss how Nadeshiko will soon purchase a gas lantern with the money she earned from her part-time job. Room Camp #2: The Outdoor Activities Club tries different objects that can be used as insulation for sleeping in their winter camping.
3	Kyōhei Tamazawa	Ayako Kitagawa	April 16, 2021
The Outdoor Activities Club checks job openings for Nadeshiko and discusses a portable heater they found in a magazine. Later, Sakura treats Nadeshiko to a tempura meal and introduces her to the store's job hiring. The Outdoor Activities Club then visits the Elk store for Nadeshiko to purchase a gas lantern. Her excitement causes the item to be launched in the air, only to be caught by the store manager. Returning home, Nadeshiko presents the gas lantern to her family. As she leaves for a convenience store, Sakura receives a portable heater from Nadeshiko as a gift. Room Camp #3: The Outdoor Activities Club checks the photos they have taken during their previous camping when Nadeshiko presents printed photos of them and plans to cover the clubroom's wall with them.
4	Mamoru Yoshino	Ayako Kitagawa	April 23, 2021
Chiaki presents new camping gears to Aoi, which consists of a skillet, wooden utensils, and a mini table. Aoi later notices that the wooden bowl cannot be used for hot food and water. Chiaki and Aoi prepare to remove the lacquer from the wooden bowl and "season" the skillet inside the school's home economics room, with Ena later joining them. The three decide to go on camping at Fuji Five Lakes next week. Afterward, Chiaki tries to use the wooden bowl with corn soup, only to emit a foul smell. Room Camp #4: The Outdoor Activities Club gestures with their body the different practices during camping.
5	Kyōhei Tamazawa	Ayako Kitagawa	April 30, 2021
Chiaki, Aoi, and Ena take a bus tour for Lake Yamanaka. They later arrive at a Montbell store in Fujiyoshida, where Chiaki struggles to find a suitable hammock until the store attendant suggests using two low chairs as an alternative. Afterward, they visit a hot spring and eat ice creams. Room Camp #5: The Outdoor Activities Club discusses methods of cooking a meal in different locations.
6	Kyōhei Tamazawa	Ayako Kitagawa	May 7, 2021
Chiaki, Aoi, and Ena do grocery shopping for kiritanpo. They later arrive at Misaki Campsite near the lake, where Chiaki plans to set their camp at the end of the cape, but the campsite manager denies her plan for safety reasons. After setting up their tent somewhere near the lake, the trio instead relaxes at the cape when they meet a corgi owned by a fellow camper. As the evening approaches, they notice a colder temperature than what they experienced before in their Christmas camping, learning that the location is situated at a higher altitude. Chiaki rushes to a convenience store to buy more hand warmers, while Aoi and Ena try to ask the manager for help in finding firewoods, only to find him leaving the campsite. Room Camp #6: Nadeshiko and Chiaki argue about what shape of the wiener they prefer, with the former favoring octopus style and the latter favoring a plain style.
7	Kyōhei Tamazawa	Ayako Kitagawa	May 14, 2021
Upon returning from the convenience store, Chiaki finds Aoi and Ena missing. Later night, a worried Minami finds the camp empty, only to find the trio in another tent by campers who own the corgi. Minami reveals that Rin contacted her worrying about their condition and advises them to do more research on winter camping. They later join the campers in a hot pot party. Back at Motosu High School, Nadeshiko finally tells Rin that she wants to try solo camping after struggling to tell this with her on the phone call the previous night. Room Camp #7: The Outdoor Activities Club presents ways to clean up the site after camping.
8	Mamoru Yoshino	Ayako Kitagawa	May 21, 2021
Rin gives Nadeshiko tips in her first solo camping. Sometime later, the Outdoor Activities Club visits Ena's house for a garden camping. Chiaki prepares her homemade sausages, but they do not like the result. After her part-time job, Rin visits them, only to be greeted by a cheerful Ena's father. Room Camp #8: The Outdoor Activities Club discusses anti-theft measures during camping. Chiaki improvises a way to sit if their camping chairs are stolen.
9	Mamoru Yoshino	Ayako Kitagawa	May 28, 2021
Nadeshiko begins her solo camping at Fujinomiya. She visits Fujisan Hongū Sengen Taisha and drops by an okonomiyaki shop. Meanwhile, Rin spends her day off by visiting Akasawa in Hayakawa and the giant cedar tree in Yushima. She later notices Sakura's car passing by. She drives off to Lake Narada and visits a hot spring, where she finds Sakura also visiting the area. Despite the effort to stealthily follow her, Rin is caught off-guard by Sakura. Room Camp #9: Rin has a terrifying dream of her Vino scooter in the voice of Nadeshiko telling her to not ignore the scooter's maintenance, prompting her to hastily clean it the following day.
10	Mamoru Yoshino	Ayako Kitagawa	June 4, 2021
Staying in Kagiya café, Rin and Sakura discuss their favorite show and Nadeshiko's ongoing solo camping. Meanwhile, Nadeshiko arrives at Fuji and reaches the Nodan Mountain Health Green Area Park for her camping. Parting ways, Sakura visits the hot spring and later a meat shop, while Rin drives off to Lake Amehata and tries to cross a hanging bridge. Rin stays in Villa Amehata when she becomes worried about Nadeshiko after being unable to receive any updates from her, prompting her to drive off towards her camp. Room Camp #10: Ena finds Rin asleep inside the library, giving her the advantage to style her hair. Afterward, fellow students notice Rin's pagoda-style hair as she walks past them.
11	Mamoru Yoshino	Ayako Kitagawa	June 11, 2021
Nadeshiko prepares foil-wrapped grilled fruits and vegetables and shares them with the two children camping with their father, during which Rin arrives and sees them afar. After checking Nadeshiko's condition, Rin is about to leave the campsite when she encounters Sakura also at the place to check on her sister. They stay for a moment to view the city lights but immediately hide when they saw Nadeshiko approaching their place. Nadeshiko attempts to find a cell signal to send a message, giving Rin and Sakura a chance to leave the campsite. Nadeshiko ponders on her past camping experience. Room Camp #11: The Outdoor Activities Club imagines using an AI cooker during their camping.
12	Mamoru Yoshino	Ayako Kitagawa	June 18, 2021
After her first solo camping, Nadeshiko desires to camp with everyone again. Minami suggests doing a group camping at Izu by early March. The Outdoor Activities Club invites Rin and Ena to join them, and they begin to earn money from their part-time jobs and prepare for the upcoming test before the Izu camping. Room Camp #12: Nadeshiko messages Rin for help in cooking hōtō, but Rin finds out it is Chiaki who has been talking to her.

== Cast and characters ==
=== Main ===
- Haruka Fukuhara as Rin Shima:
  A teenage girl who has a passion for camping after being inspired by her grandfather in middle school.
- Yūno Ōhara as Nadeshiko Kagamihara:
  A teenage girl who falls asleep after riding her bicycle to Mount Fuji. Nadeshiko encounters Rin by that time and is inspired by her to try camping. She later joins the Outdoor Activities Club.
- Momoko Tanabe as Chiaki Ōgaki:
  The president of the Outdoor Activities Club who is acquainted with Rin yet is wary of her.
- Yumena Yanai as Aoi Inuyama:
  A teenage girl who speaks with a Kansai dialect and is the founding member of the Outdoor Activities Club along with Chiaki.
- Sara Shida as Ena Saitō:
  A teenage girl who is friends with Rin and supports her solo camping by sending her private messages while at home.
- Yurina Yanagi as Sakura Kagamihara:
  The older sister of Nadeshiko who loves driving.
- Kaho Tsuchimura as Minami Toba:
  A teacher at Motosu High School and the advisor of the Outdoor Activities Club.

=== Recurring ===
- Ayumi Mikata as Saki Shima: Rin's mother.
- Yusuke Noguchi as Shūichirō Kagamihara: Nadeshiko's father.
- Eiko Yamamoto as Shizuka Kagamihara: Nadeshiko's mother.
- Yuki Tayama as Nadeshiko's supervisor at her part-time job in Yutakaya

=== Guest ===
- Honoka Kitahara as Ryōko Toba: Minami's younger sister.
- Yuka Kouri as Kikukawa Subaru: A mountain climber whom Rin encounters at Yashajin Pass and later at a tea shop where she works.
- Aina Nishizawa as Akari Inuyama: Aoi's younger sister.
- Anna Ishii as Ayano Toki:
  A childhood friend of Nadeshiko who rides a motorcycle. She meets Rin when the latter visits the house of Nadeshiko's grandmother.
- Jun Hashimoto as Jun Saitō: Ena's father.
- Miki Kanai as Mr. Iida's daughter who has a pet corgi
- Manabu Hosoi as Mr. Iida: An owner of a wine shop at Izu who is camping with her daughter at Lake Yamanaka.
- Sento Takemori as Shinichi Ichinomiya: A father of two who is camping nearby at the same campsite as Nadeshiko during her first solo camping.
- Kokoro Hirasawa as Haruka Ichinomiya: Shinichi's daughter.
- Yuki Takasugi as Hiroto Ichinomiya: Shinichi's son.

== Production ==
=== Development and casting ===
In November 2019, TV Tokyo announced that Takashi Ninomiya, Mamoru Koshino, and Kyōhei Tamazawa would be directing and Ayako Kitagawa would be writing the live-action drama television adaptation of Laid-Back Camp manga series by Afro. Shinya Fujino at TV Tokyo, Kiichi Kumagai at Headquarters, and Tatsuya Iwakura at SDP would be producing the series. That month, Haruka Fukuhara, Yūno Ōhara, Momoko Tanabe, Yumena Yanai, and Sara Shida were revealed to be starring as Rin Shima, Nadeshiko Kagamihara, Chiaki Ōgaki, Aoi Inuyama, and Ena Saitō, respectively. In December 2019, Yurina Yanagi and Kaho Tsuchimura were announced to be joining the cast as Sakura Kagamihara and Minami Toba, respectively, with the talent dog Yamaguchi Choco portraying the live-action version of Chikuwa. In February 2020, comedian Hiroshi was announced to be making an appearance as "Solo Camper Hiroshi" in the eighth and eleventh episode following his voice-only role in the third episode as a radio personality.

In November 2020, the series was renewed for a second season, with Kitagawa returning to write the script and Ninomiya, Koshino, and Tamazawa returning to direct. Tomohiro Goda at TV Tokyo (replacing Fujino), Kumagai at Headquarters, and Iwakura at SDP would be producing the season, with Goda's colleague Noboru Morita serving as the chief producer. That month, Fukuhara, Ōhara, Tanabe, Yanai, Shida, Yanagi, and Tsuchimura were set to be reprising their roles from the first season. In February 2021, a special program for the series, Laid-Back Camp Special (ゆるキャン△スペシャル), was announced for a March 29 release before the second season premiere. In March 2021, a live-action adaptation of Room Camp was announced to be aired along with the season. That month, Anna Ishii and Jun Hashimoto were revealed to be joining the cast as Ayano Toki and Jun Saitō, Ena's father, respectively. In April 2021, Akio Otsuka, who voiced Rin's grandfather in the anime series of the same name, reprised his role in the second episode, and comedian Mizuki Nishimura was revealed to be making an appearance in the sixth episode as the campsite manager at Lake Yamanaka.

=== Filming ===
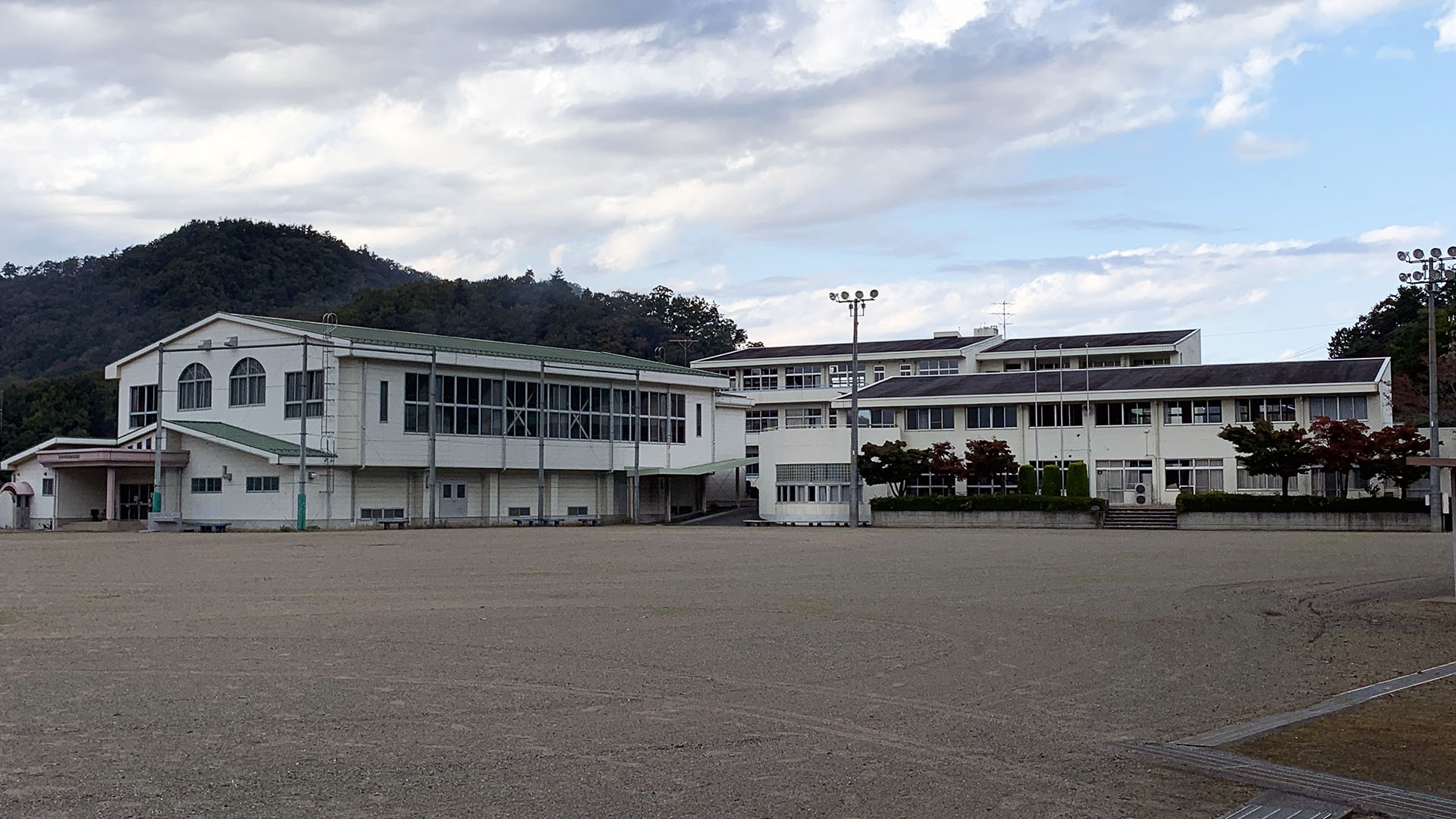
Shimobe Elementary and Middle School in Minobu, Yamanashi

Filming began in seven campsites that were used as inspiration for the settings in the manga series after obtaining a permit from the Home of Mt. Fuji Yamanashi Film Commission. The former Shimobe Elementary and Middle School in Minobu, Yamanashi was used as the filming location for Motosu High School, the fictional school where the characters of the series attend.

=== Music ===
In December 2019, it was announced that the opening and ending theme music for the first season would be "Without Blinking" (瞬きもせずに, Mabataki mo Sezu ni) by H△G and "Replay" by Longman, respectively. The ending theme music was released digitally by Sony Music Labels on January 24, 2020, and is included in the album Just a Boy by Longman, which was released in Japan on February 5. The opening theme music is included in the Blu-ray album of the same name, which was released in Japan by Feel Mee on March 25.

In February 2021, it was announced that the opening theme music for the series' special episode and second season would be "Hello Youth" by Longman. In March 2021, Sarasa Kadowaki was revealed to be performing the ending theme music "Please Don't Forget" (わすれものをしないように, Wasure mono o shinai yō ni). The opening theme music was released digitally by Sony Music Labels on March 31, 2021, and is included in the mini-album This Is Youth by Longman, which was released in Japan on May 19. The ending theme music was released digitally on April 7, 2021.

== Release ==
=== Broadcast ===
The first season of Laid-Back Camp premiered in Japan on TV Tokyo, TV Osaka, and TV Aichi on January 10, 2020, and concluded on March 27, consisting of 12 episodes. The special program Laid-Back Camp Special aired on TV Tokyo on March 29, 2021. The second season premiered on TV Tokyo, TV Osaka, and TV Aichi on April 2, 2021, and concluded on June 18, consisting of 12 episodes.

=== Home media ===
Amazon Prime Video serves as the streaming service for Laid-Back Camp in Japan. The Blu-ray and DVD for the first season was released in Japan on October 9, 2020. The Blu-ray and DVD for the second season was released in Japan on October 6, 2021, which includes the special program and the script for Room Camp.

== Reception ==
Laid-Back Camp was ranked sixth among the top ten dramas of 2020 by writer and drama critic Reiichi Narima.
