= Laid-Back Camp =

Japanese manga series by Afro

- Cover of the first volume of the manga featuring Nadeshiko Kagamihara (left) and Rin Shima (right) as released in Japan by Houbunsha

ゆるキャン△ (Yurukyan)
- Genre: Adventure; Iyashikei
- Manga
- Written by: Afro
- Published by: Houbunsha
- English publisher: NA: Yen Press
- Magazine: Manga Time Kirara Forward; (2015–2019); Comic Fuz; (2019–present)
- Original run: July 2015 – present
- Volumes: 19
- Anime television series
- Directed by: Yoshiaki Kyōgoku (S1–S2); Shin Tosaka (S3–S4)
- Written by: Jin Tanaka (S1–S2); Masafumi Sugiura (S3–S4)
- Music by: Akiyuki Tateyama
- Studio: C-Station (S1–S2); Eight Bit (S3); FuRyu Pictures (S4)
- Licensed by: Crunchyroll (streaming); SEA: Medialink
- Original network: AT-X, Tokyo MX, BS11, Sun TV, KBS Kyoto
- Original run: January 4, 2018 – present
- Episodes: 37 + 8 OVA
- Video game

Laid-Back Camp Virtual: Lake Motosu
- Developer: Gemdrops
- Publisher: Gemdrops, Clouded Leopard Entertainment
- Genre: Virtual reality, adventure game
- Platform: Microsoft Windows, PlayStation 4, Nintendo Switch, iOS, Android
- Released: WW: March 3, 2021
- Video game

Laid-Back Camp Virtual: Fumoto Campsite
- Developer: Gemdrops
- Publisher: Gemdrops, Clouded Leopard Entertainment
- Genre: Virtual reality, adventure game
- Platform: Microsoft Windows, PlayStation 4, Nintendo Switch, iOS, Android
- Released: WW: April 7, 2021
- Video game

Laid-Back Camp: Have a Nice Day
- Developer: Mages
- Publisher: Mages
- Genre: Visual novel, adventure game
- Platform: PlayStation 4, Nintendo Switch
- Released: JP: November 11, 2021
- Video game

Laid-Back Camp: All-in-One!!
- Developer: Enish
- Platform: Android, iOS, Microsoft Windows, macOS
- Released: WW: June 15, 2023
- Other
- Room Camp; Laid-Back Camp (TV series); Laid-Back Camp Movie
- icon

Laid-Back Camp (Japanese: ゆるキャン△, Hepburn: Yurukyan) is a Japanese manga series written and illustrated by Afro. Set in and around Yamanashi, Japan, the series chronicles the adventures of Rin Shima, Nadeshiko Kagamihara, and their friends as they travel to various campsites across the country.

The manga was first serialized in Houbunsha's Manga Time Kirara Forward magazine from July 2015 to February 2019 until it was transferred to the publisher website and app for manga called Comic Fuz. It has been collected in nineteen tankōbon volumes. The manga is licensed in North America by Yen Press.

An anime television series adaptation by C-Station, aired on AT-X from January to March 2018. A short anime spin-off, titled Room Camp, aired from January to March 2020. A live action drama series aired in Japan from January to March 2020, and a second drama season aired from April to June 2021. A second anime season aired from January to April 2021, and an anime film premiered on July 1, 2022. A virtual reality video game based on the series was released in March 2021, and a visual novel developed by MAGES was released in November 2021. A third anime season aired from April to June 2024. A fourth season is set to premiere in April 2027.

== Premise ==
Rin Shima, an avid solo camper, is on one of her usual solo camping trips. As night falls, she is suddenly tasked with taking care of Nadeshiko Kagamihara, who finds herself lost after oversleeping on a bench on her way to see Mount Fuji. As Nadeshiko's older sister, Sakura, picks her up, she ponders about the possibility of camping with Rin again. This involuntary encounter inspires Nadeshiko to join the Outdoor Activities Club with its two only members, Chiaki Ōgaki & Aoi Inuyama, as they all go on camping trips together, mainly in Yamanashi Prefecture, while also showcasing the camping trips of Rin Shima, who doesn't join the club, but opens up to the idea of group camping.

== Characters ==
=== Main characters ===
Nadeshiko Kagamihara (各務原 なでしこ, Kagamihara Nadeshiko)
Voiced by: Yumiri Hanamori (Japanese); Morgan Lauré Garrett (English)
Portrayed by: Yuno Ōhara
The main protagonist; a lively yet ditzy member of the Outdoor Activities Club. While initially having no experience, her interest in camping is sparked when Rin rescues her after cycling on her own to see Mount Fuji. She is passionate about food, a trait picked up from her father; it is soon revealed that she was originally chubby before her strict older sister, Sakura, forced her to lose weight by doing laps around Lake Hamana. Her skills in cooking also shows this passion, being skilled in making hot pot for the others. She also boasts great physical strength & stamina, for example, through being able to run with ease, despite the heavy camping gear on her back on her way to the Eastwood Campgrounds. Her surname hails from an alternative, traditional form of the name of Kakamigahara, Gifu.
In the film, she works as a member of a camping retail shop.
Rin Shima (志摩 リン, Shima Rin)
Voiced by: Nao Tōyama (Japanese); Celeste Perez (English)
Portrayed by: Haruka Fukuhara
A quiet and reserved girl who likes to go solo camping after inheriting the necessary equipment from her grandfather, Hajime, who was her main influence. She usually camps in the off-season in the colder months (in winter & autumn) when it is quieter. While initially being reluctant to the idea of camping in a group, she eventually warms up to the idea as the series progresses; she still does not join the Outdoor Activities Club, preferring solitude. She is shown to have passion for dogs & books, the latter being shown through her presence at the school library as the librarian, reading books at campsites, and her part-time job working at a bookstore. She often drives her Yamaha Vino moped. She is nicknamed "Shimarin" by Chiaki Ōgaki. Her surname hails from Shima, Mie.
In the film, Rin works as a magazine editor of a publishing company in Nagoya after being promoted from the sales department; she leads the project to redevelop a previously abandoned facility into a campsite in Yamanashi Prefecture.
Chiaki Ōgaki (大垣 千明, Ōgaki Chiaki)
Voiced by: Sayuri Hara (Japanese); Katelyn Barr (English)
Portrayed by: Momoko Tanabe
The boisterous president of the Outdoor Activities Club. It is revealed in Room Camp Episode 0 that a camping trip with her family in kindergarten greatly ignited her love for the outdoors, inspiring her to found the Outdoor Activities Club with her long-time friend, Aoi Inuyama. Her brashness can sometimes lead to humbling pratfalls, such as consistently underperforming in her high-school exams, or passing out when challenged to a race up the peak of Mount Misuji. She works part-time at a liquor store, adjacent to the supermarket that Aoi works at, and is often referred to as "Aki" by the others. Her surname hails from Ōgaki, Gifu.
In the film, she works in promoting the tourism industry in Yamanashi Prefecture after quitting her previous job in Tokyo, and brings the main characters together to help revitalise the aforementioned abandoned facility in the prefecture.
Aoi Inuyama (犬山 あおい, Inuyama Aoi)
Voiced by: Aki Toyosaki (Japanese); Hannah Alyea (English)
Portrayed by: Yumena Yanai
Referred to as "Inuko" by Chiaki as the result of a naming mistake, Aoi is Chiaki's long-time friend with a mutual interest in camping, co-founding the Outdoor Activities Club with her. She is a calm, soft-spoken and kind-hearted girl, although she has the tendency to lie and tell tall-tales, discerned by when her eyes dart around, a prominent running gag. She speaks in the Kansai dialect, and she also shares birthdays with Nadeshiko, both being born on March 4. Her younger sister, Akari, shares much of the same traits as her. Her surname hails from Inuyama, Aichi.
In the film, she remains in Yamanashi Prefecture to work as an elementary school teacher; her students refer to as "Aoi-chan" because of her soft-spoken nature. While the school she works at would eventually close, she gets a teaching job at another elementary school.
Ena Saitō (斉藤 恵那, Saitō Ena)
Voiced by: Rie Takahashi (Japanese); Molly Zhang (English)
Portrayed by: Sara Shida
Rin's cheery and upbeat classmate, who has a flair for sleeping in late. She likes to tease Rin and pull pranks on her, much to the latter's chagrin. Originally not interested in winter camping at all, mostly because of her dislike of the cold, she starts to see its appeal after accepting Chiaki and Aoi's offer to go Christmas camping at Asagiri Plateau. Like Rin, however, she does not join the Outdoor Activities Club, much preferring to wind down after school to sleep in even more, an activity she calls part of the "go-home club". She has a pet chihuahua named Chikuwa (ちくわ), with whom she often sleeps together with. Her name hails from Ena, Gifu.
In the film, she works at a dog grooming salon in Yokohama, with her parents taking care of Chikuwa.
Ema Mizunami (瑞浪 絵真, Mizunami Ema)
Voiced by: Maria Sashide (Japanese); Reshel Mae (English)
A new first year student who attends Motosu High School along with her best friend, Mei Nakatsugawa. She is first introduced to Ena Saitō after drawing her and Chikuwa's picture at Fujikawa Park, eventually getting to know the other main characters as the story progresses. Her main hobby is drawing; while initially having a primitive drawing tablet-phone set-up, her parents buy her a new drawing tablet as a gift for her starting high school. She plans to pay them back by working part-time at Caribou, the store that the Outdoor Activities Club frequents, after one of the original employees, Seki, moves to Niigata for her upcoming marriage.
Mei Nakatsugawa (中津川 メイ, Nakatsugawa Mei)
Voiced by: Kokoa Amano (Japanese); Gillian Lange (English)
Ema's best friend, who attends Motosu High School with her in her first year. After running late to school on her bike and getting a flat tyre, she meets up with Aoi Inuyama — now a semi-experienced mountain bike rider — who helps her fix her it. This inspires her to buy her own mountain bike, and after initial discouragement from the cycling club's intense training regiment, she becomes a new member of the Outdoor Activities Club. She is also the owner of the Samoyed dog Hanpen (半片), the mascot of one of Nadeshiko's favourite WeTube channels, Hanpen's Happy Days.

=== Supporting characters ===
Sakura Kagamihara (各務原 桜, Kagamihara Sakura)
Voiced by: Marina Inoue (Japanese); Robin Clayton (English)
Portrayed by: Yurina Yanagi
Nadeshiko's older sister. She loves driving. Often drives her Nissan Rasheen. She is a big fan of "Moped Journey" by How Do You Like Wednesday? and owns all the DVDs of East Japan (ja), West Japan, and Overseas (ja).
Minami Toba (鳥羽 美波, Toba Minami)
Voiced by: Shizuka Itō (Japanese); Leah Clark (English)
Portrayed by: Kaho Tsuchimura
A substitute teacher at Motosu High School. She became the Outdoor Activities Circle's advisor as she prefers clubs that are not busy most of the time. She drinks alcohol a lot. She is first met by Nadeshiko and Rin during their camping while she is camping with her little sister. She drives her Suzuki Hustler. Her surname comes from Toba, Mie.
Ryōko Toba (鳥羽 涼子, Toba Ryōko)
Voiced by: Sachi Kokuryu (Japanese); Rowan Gilvie (English)
Portrayed by: Honoka Kitahara
Minami's younger sister, who commonly camps with her. The Outdoor Activities Circle girls originally assume her to be a boy. She lent her Nissan Lafesta to her sister in Izu camp.
Ayano Toki (土岐 綾乃, Toki Ayano)
Voiced by: Tomoyo Kurosawa (Japanese); Katie Wetch (English)
Portrayed by: Anna Ishii
Nadeshiko's childhood friend from middle school. Often rides her Honda Ape 100. Her surname comes from Toki, Gifu.
Hajime Shinshiro (新城 肇, Shinshiro Hajime)
Voiced by: Akio Ōtsuka (anime and drama) (Japanese); Larry Cassady (English)
Rin's maternal grandfather. He loves outdoor camping, and he is the one who inspired Rin to begin camping. Often rides his Triumph Thruxton 1200R and drives his Honda Acty Van in manga and anime / Toyota HiAce in drama. He first appeared in anime as the old man who camps alone who Chiaki met when she was scouting for a campsite. His voice actor is also the narrator in the anime, which could mean he is the narrator himself. His surname comes from Shinshiro, Aichi.
Wataru Shima (志摩 渉, Shima Wataru)
Voiced by: Takahiro Sakurai (Japanese); Phil Parsons (English)
Rin's father. He goes to work with a moped. In the anime, he first appeared in a special OVA episode where he borrowed a three-wheeler motor scooter Yamaha Tricity as a substitute for Rin's moped which was being serviced at that time. Often drives his Subaru Forester.
Saki Shima (志摩 咲, Shima Saki)
Voiced by: Kaori Mizuhashi (Japanese); Kelsey Maher (English)
Portrayed by: Ayumi Mikata
Rin's mother. She went camping together with her husband and father (Rin's grandfather) in the past. She used to ride a Yamaha SR400.
Shūichiro Kagamihara (各務原 修一朗, Kagamihara Shūichiro)
Voiced by: Shintaro Ōhata (Japanese); Anthony Bowling (English)
Portrayed by: Yūsuke Noguchi
Nadeshiko's father. He loves eating.
Shizuka Kagamihara (各務原 静花, Kagamihara Shizuka)
Voiced by: Nozomi Yamamoto (Japanese); Monét Lerner (English)
Portrayed by: Eiko Yamamoto
Nadeshiko's mother.
Akari Inuyama (犬山 あかり, Inuyama Akari)
Voiced by: Risae Matsuda (Japanese); Lindsay Seidel (English)
Portrayed by: Aina Nishizawa
Aoi's mischievous younger sister.
Mineko Inuyama (犬山 みね子, Inuyama Mineko)
Voiced by: Naomi Shindō
Aoi's grandmother.
Jun Saitō (斉藤 潤, Saitō Jun)
Portrayed by: Jun Hashimoto
Ena's father.
Narration
Voiced by: Akio Ōtsuka (anime) (Japanese); Larry Cassady (English)

== Media ==
=== Manga ===
The series began serialization in Houbunsha's Manga Time Kirara Forward magazine in July 2015 until 2019 when it was transferred to the new website and app Comic Fuz. Nineteen volumes have been released so far. Yen Press has licensed the manga for a North American release, and released the first volume of the manga in English in March 2018.

No.	Original release date	Original ISBN	English release date	English ISBN
1	November 12, 2015	978-4-8322-4635-5	March 27, 2018	978-0-316-51778-2
2	July 12, 2016	978-4-8322-4719-2	June 5, 2018	978-0-316-51782-9
3	February 10, 2017	978-4-8322-4804-5	July 24, 2018	978-0-316-51785-0
4	July 12, 2017	978-4-8322-4851-9	November 13, 2018	978-1-9753-5480-0
5	December 12, 2017	978-4-8322-4900-4	February 19, 2019	978-1-9753-0192-7
6	March 12, 2018	978-4-8322-4927-1	May 21, 2019	978-1-9753-2863-4
7	October 11, 2018	978-4-8322-4983-7	September 24, 2019	978-1-9753-5812-9
8	April 26, 2019	978-4-8322-7092-3	March 24, 2020	978-1-9753-0845-2
9	January 10, 2020	978-4-8322-7149-4	August 25, 2020	978-1-9753-1537-5
10	March 12, 2020	978-4-8322-7174-6	August 31, 2021	978-1-9753-1677-8
11	January 7, 2021	978-4-8322-7240-8	April 26, 2022	978-1-9753-3583-0
12	April 12, 2021	978-4-8322-7269-9	September 27, 2022	978-1-9753-3776-6
13	March 10, 2022	978-4-8322-7352-8	April 18, 2023	978-1-9753-5174-8
14	November 10, 2022	978-4-8322-7415-0	October 17, 2023	978-1-9753-7268-2
15	November 10, 2023	978-4-8322-9501-8	October 15, 2024	978-1-9753-9696-1
16	March 12, 2024	978-4-8322-9529-2	February 18, 2025	979-8-8554-0997-0
17	March 12, 2025	978-4-8322-9621-3	February 24, 2026	979-8-8554-2597-0
18	November 12, 2025	978-4-8322-9674-9	November 24, 2026	979-8-8554-4038-6
19	October 9, 2026	978-4-8322-9757-9	—	—

=== Anime ===
An anime television series adaptation, directed by Yoshiaki Kyōgoku and produced by C-Station, aired from January 4 to March 22, 2018, on AT-X and other networks. Jin Tanaka supervised the series' scripts and Mutsumi Sasaki designed the characters. The opening theme song is "Shiny Days", performed by Asaka, while the ending theme song is "Fuyubiyori" (ふゆびより), performed by Eri Sasaki. The series was released on three Blu-ray Disc/DVD volumes between March 28 and July 25, 2018, each containing an additional OVA episode. Crunchyroll co-produced, financed and streamed the series. The season received an English dub, which was released on Crunchyroll on August 2, 2022.

A second season, new film, and short anime were announced to be in production in October 2018. The short anime, titled Room Camp, aired from January 6 to March 23, 2020. The series is directed by Masato Jinbo, with Mutsumi Ito handling series composition, and Mutsumi Sasaki as character designer. Yoshiaki Kyōgoku is credited as supervisor, while C-Station is returning to produce the short anime. The theme song is "The Sunshower", performed by Asaka. A special episode was bundled with the series' Blu-ray Disc/DVD volume on May 27, 2020. The second season aired from January 7 to April 1, 2021. The opening theme song is "Seize the Day", performed by Asaka, and the ending theme song is "Haru no Tonari" (はるのとなり; lit. 'Next to Spring'), performed by Eri Sasaki. The film premiered in Japan on July 1, 2022, with returning main staff and cast members of the television series.

A third season was announced in October 2022. It is animated by Eight Bit and directed by Shin Tosaka, with Masafumi Sugiura handling series composition and Hisanori Hashimoto designing the characters. The third season aired from April 4 to June 20, 2024. The opening theme song is "Reidobakku Jānī" (レイドバックジャーニー; lit. 'Laid-Back Journey'), performed by Kiminone, and the ending theme song is "So Precious", performed by Asaka.

A fourth season was announced to be in production in November 2024. It is animated by FuRyu Pictures, with Ryūta Ura serving as the new character designer and the rest of the staff from the third season reprising their roles. The fourth season is set to premiere in April 2027. The opening theme song is "Brand New..", performed by Asaka, and the ending theme song is "Happa no Tegami" (はっぱの手紙; lit. 'Leaf Letter') by Eri Sasaki.

=== Live action ===
A live-action television adaptation of the manga was announced in November 2019. Actress Haruka Fukuhara portrays Rin Shima, with Yuno Ōhara, Momoko Tanabe, Yumena Yanai, and Sara Shida respectively playing supporting characters Nadeshiko Kagamihara, Chiaki Ōgaki, Aoi Inuyama, and Ena Saitō. The drama premiered on TV Tokyo on January 10, 2020, and its first season concluded on March 27, 2020. A special program is scheduled for broadcast on March 29, 2021, and a second season of the drama premiered on April 2, 2021.

=== Video games ===
A virtual reality video game based on the series, titled Laid-Back Camp: Virtual Camp (ゆるキャン△ VIRTUAL CAMP, Yurukyan: Bācharu Kyanpu) was developed by Gemdrops. The game is described as a "virtual camping adventure" and is available in two versions, one set at Lake Motosu and another set at the Fumoto Campgrounds on Asagiri Plateau. It is available for Microsoft Windows, Nintendo Switch, PlayStation 4, iOS, and Android, and supports the Nintendo Labo VR Kit and PlayStation VR accessories. The Lake Motosu version was released on March 4, 2021, and the Fumoto Campgrounds version was released on April 7, 2021.

Characters from the series appeared alongside other Manga Time Kirara characters in the mobile RPG Kirara Fantasia in 2018, as well as in collaboration with Akatsuki's mobile baseball game Cinderella Nine in 2019, as well as in collaboration with Happy Elements's mobile role-playing game Merc Storia in 2021.

A visual novel, titled Laid-Back Camp: Have a Nice Day! (ゆるキャン△ Have a nice day!, Yurukyan: Habu a Naisu Dei!), was developed and published by MAGES, and released on PlayStation 4 and Nintendo Switch in Japan on November 11, 2021. There are no announced plans to release the game in other regions.

In February 2022, Enish announced the first mobile game for the anime series, which is set to be released that year. In July 2022, pre-registration for the game was opened, with the title being revealed as Laid-Back Camp: All-in-One!! (ゆるキャン△ つなげるみんなのオールインワン！！, Yurukyan: Tsunageru Minna no Ōruinwan!!). In November 2022, Enish delayed the game to 2023, stating that it was "for better game content and quality improvement". In April 2023, Enish revealed the worldwide release date of the game to be on May 24. In May 2023, the game was delayed again to June 15, with the game's producer Atsushi Sanada stating that the third delay would help in improving the server stability due to the high number of initial downloads pre-release. Upon its release, the game was revealed to be available for download on PC.

In March 2024, a mobile puzzle game based on the anime series, titled Laid-Back Camp: Puzzle Camp (ゆるキャン△～ぱずるキャンプ～, Yurukyan: Pazuru Kyanpu), was announced. It was released on Android and iOS on July 25, 2024.

In September 2025, a new "camping action game" from Enish, titled Yuru Camp: Minna de Wachawacha! Camping Cook! (ゆるキャン△ みんなでワチャワチャ！キャンピングクック！, Laid-Back Camp: Let's All Chi-Chat! Cooking Camp!), was revealed to be released on Nintendo Switch and PC that year.

=== Other media ===
A voice drama based on the anime series, titled Yuru Camp: Min'na de Nagameru Fuyu no Hoshizora Kyanpu! (ゆるキャン△ みんなで眺める冬の星空キャンプ！; lit. 'Laid-Back Camp: A Winter Starry Sky Camp for Everyone to Gaze At!'), was released on the voice drama distribution platform Mimicle on June 16, 2023. Yumiri Hanamori, Nao Tōyama, Sayuri Hara, and Aki Toyosaki reprised their roles for the drama. Toshihisa Kio wrote the scenario, which depicts Rin and the members of the Outdoor Activities Club going on a weekend camping trip one winter day to do stargazing.

A drama CD based on the anime series, titled Laid-Back Camp Drama CD: Camp Manual by Nokuru (ゆるキャン△ ドラマCD ～野クルが作るキャンプマニュアル～), was released in Japan on June 28, 2023. It follows the members of the Outdoor Activities Club creating a manual, with Rin and Ena's assistance, that features the appeal of camping to recruit new members and secure a new large clubroom.

== Reception ==
The English release of the first three volumes of the manga were included on the American Library Association's list of 2019 Great Graphic Novels for Teens. The manga was also nominated for an Eisner Award in the category "Best U.S. Edition of International Material—Asia" in 2019.

In November 2019, Polygon named Laid-Back Camp as one of the best anime of the 2010s, describing it as "the ultimate comfy, slice-of-life anime", and Crunchyroll listed it in their "Top 100 best anime of the 2010s". IGN also listed Laid-Back Camp among the best anime series of the 2010s, stating that it is "a wonderful celebration of nature and friendship". Patrick Lum of The Guardian listed Laid-Back Camp as one of his best iyashikei anime series.

The anime significantly increased local tourism for the places featured, with several campgrounds reporting their number of visitors tripling.

== See also ==
- Mono, another manga series with the same creator
