= Room Camp =

Japanese manga series

- Official banner image of the manga on Comic Fuz website

へやキャン△ (Heyakyan)
- Genre: Slice of life
- Created by: Afro
- Manga
- Written by: Afro
- Published by: Houbunsha
- Magazine: Kirara Base; 2016 – present; Comic Fuz; 2019 – present
- Original run: April 9, 2016 – present
- Anime television series
- Directed by: Masato Jinbo
- Produced by: Hideo Momota; Hiroyuki Kobayashi; Satoru Shimosato; Shōichi Hotta; Shota Watase; Shunsuke Matsumura; Sôji Miyagi; Tomoyuki Ohwada
- Written by: Mutsumi Ito
- Music by: Akiyuki Tateyama
- Studio: C-Station; DeNA
- Licensed by: Crunchyroll (Note: Crunchyroll made the series available in North America, Central America, South America, Europe, Africa, Oceania, and the Middle East.); Medialink (Note: Medialink made the series available on Ani-One worldwide, except in Hong Kong and Singapore.)
- Original network: AT-X, BS11, Tokyo MX
- Original run: January 6, 2020 – March 23, 2020
- Episodes: 12 + 1 special episode

Room Camp (Japanese: へやキャン△, Hepburn: Heyakyan) is a Japanese manga series written and illustrated by Afro as a spin-off of Laid-Back Camp. It has been serialized by Houbunsha on Kirara Base since April 9, 2016, and on their manga service Comic Fuz since March 12, 2019. The manga was later adapted into an anime series written by Mutsumi Ito and directed by Masato Jinbo, which was aired in Japan from January 6 to March 23, 2020. Selected chapters of the manga were later adapted into live action, which was shown at the end of every episode of the second season of the live-action version of Laid-Back Camp.

== Premise ==
The manga series, according to Afro, is an "extra edition" of his other manga series Laid-Back Camp that focuses on having a chat in the club room. The anime series follows Nadeshiko Kagamihara killing time inside the room of the Outdoor Activities Club, a club in Motosu High School, when Chiaki Ōgaki and Aoi Inuyama announce their plan to go on a trip and drag her on a journey across Yamanashi Prefecture.

== Media ==
=== Manga ===
Room Camp is derived from the chapter of the same name of Laid-Back Camp, which has subchapters titled "After-School" (放課後, Hōkago). Houbunsha began serializing it in Japan on Kirara Base, the official section of the publisher on the website Niconico Seiga, on April 9, 2016. The publisher's manga service Comic Fuz announced in February 2019 the addition of the manga along with Laid-Back Camp in their catalog, while its serialization on Kirara Base continues. The manga was added on March 12, 2019. Comic Fuz announced in November 2019 the creation of a separate section for the manga to address the difficulty of the readers when reading it and Laid-Back Camp on the same section. As of June 13, 2023, a total of 134 chapters have been serialized on Comic Fuz, while the 135th chapter has been released on Kirara Base.

==== Chapter list ====
- 1. "Camping Gear Is Expensive" (キャンプ道具たかい)
- 2. "Winter Camping Provisions" (冬キャン対策)
- 3. "Effects of Outdoor Cooking" (外メシ効果)
- 4. "Welcome, Newcomer" (新人さんいらっしゃい)
- 5. "Wallets and Wisdom" (財布と相談)
- 6. "Bear Infestation Warning" (クマ出没注意)
- 7. "Practice for Camping" (キャンプの練習)
- 8. "Camping Games" (キャンゲー)
- 9. "Soba 'n' Udon" (ソバウドン)
- 10. "Handle with Care" (取り扱い注意)
- 11. "Hospitality" (おもてなし)
- 12. "Winter Samurai" (冬のSAMURAI)
- 13. "Mystery of the Tuna Cans" (ツナ缶のナゾ)
- 14. "A Real-life Scary Story" (本当にあった怖い話)
- 15. "The Truly Terrifying Cinema Festival" (本当に怖いシネマフェス)
- 16. "Craftsmanship" (クラフトマンシップ)
- 17. "New Sea Camping Style" (NEW海キャンスタイル)
- 18. "Things + Animals = Mascot Characters" (物+動物=ゆるキャラ)
- 19. "Saitō-san Is Right Behind You" (うしろの斉藤さん)
- 20. "Stealth Saitō-san" (ステルス斉藤さん)
- 21. "Camping Memories" (キャンプの思い出)
- 22. "Tako-san, Wiener-san" (タコさんウインナーさん)
- 23. "Camping Bike" (キャンピング自転車)
- 24. "OEC, 10 Years Later" (野クル10年後)
- 25. "OEC, 60 Years Later" (野クル60年後)
- 26. "National Camping Characteristics" (キャンプのお国柄)
- 27. "Ever-growing Treehouse" (ぐんぐんツリーハウス)
- 28. "How Many People Can Fit in Your Tent? (あなたのテントは何人用？)
- 29. "Fun Factory Tour" (わくわく工場見学)
- 30. "Plans for Next Summer" (来年の夏の予定)
- 31. "OEC, 1,000 Years On" (野クル1000年後)
- 32. "Girl of Nature Shimarin" (大自然の少女しまりん)
- 33. "Girl of Outer Space Shimarin" (大宇宙の少女しまりん)
- 34. "The Shizu-'nashi Conflict" (静梨の乱)
- 35. "Japanese Camping Fairy Tale" (日本きゃんぷばなし)
- 36. "Tightrope Fun" (たのしいつなわたり)
- 37. "Lots of Mount Fujis" (ふじさんがたくさん)
- 38. "Snow Hut Memories" (かまくらの思い出)
- 39. "UL Camping Recs" (UL キャンプのススメ)
- 40. "I Have a Blanket" (ブランケットあるよ)
- 41. "****ing" (○○イング)
- 42. "Unused Treasure" (宝の持ち腐れ)
- 43. "Wabi-sabi" (わびさび)
- 44. "Camping Videos" (キャンプ動画)
- 45. "Chikuwa and the Frisbee" (フリスビーとちくわ)
- 46. "Lax Camp" (ゆるいキャンプ)
- 47. "Let's Look at Camping from Above" (空からキャンプを見てみよう)
- 48. "Maintenance Is Key" (整備は大事)
- 49. "Disposable" (使い捨て)
- 50. "Convenient Outdoor Goods" (アウトドア便利グッズ)
- 51. "How to Draw" (えかきうた)
- 52. "Outdoor Food Is Tasty" (外メシうまい)
- 53. "Just by Boiling Some Water" (お湯をかけるだけ)
- 54. "Convenient Outdoor Goods 2" (アウトドア便利グッズ 2)
- 55. "Scam Warning" (乗っ取り注意)
- 56. "The Waffle Maker Trap" (ワッフルメーカーの罠)
- 57. "Toyama and Mount Fuji" (富山と富士山)
- 58. "What's True of Most Campgrounds" (キャンプ場あるある)
- 59. "The Convenient Rental Trunk" (便利な貸しトランク)
- 60. "Camp Cleanup" (キャンプの片付け)
- 61. "The Rules of Cleaning Up Campsites" (キャンプ場の片づけルール)
- 62. "△△"
- 63. "What If Chikuwa Was Actually Chikuwa?" (ちくわが本当にちくわだったら)
- 64. "Hōtō As You Like It" (ほうとうはご自由に)
- 65. "Rin's Adventure" (リンの旅)
- 66. "Team Fire Snake" (ファイアスネーク組み)
- 67. "No One Asked for That" (よけいなお世話)
- 68. "Camping on the Go!" (走るキャンパー)
- 69. "The Inner Workings of Secret Society B.L.A.N.K.E.T." (秘密結社の活動内容)
- 70. "Wearable Tent" (着るテント)
- 71. "The OEC (Actually Just Chiaki), Sixty Years from Now" (野クル千明だけ60年後)
- 72. "Knitting Gaffe" (編みまちがい)
- 73. "The Kagamihara Conundrum" (各務原問題)
- 74. "One Caribō-kun per Household" (一家に一頭カリブーくん)
- 75. "Miniature Camp" (ミニチュアキャンプ)
- 76. "Burning Power" (燃やして発電)
- 77. "Those Who Smoosh" (つぶして焼くやつ)
- 78. "Sandwich Shenanigans" (サンドイッチむずい)
- 79. "Knock Knock, Kitty" (猫バンバン)
- 80. "Dys-Camp" (でぃすキャン)
- 81. "To Keep or To Toss" (取捨選択)
- 82. "Camp Crime Countermeasures" (キャンプの盗難対策)
- 83. "The Truth of the Mount Fuji Illustration" (富士山イラストの真実)
- 84. "Rainy Day Camping" (雨の日キャンプ)
- 85. "The Ordinary and the Extraordinary" (日常と非日常)
- 86. "It's a Prank" (うそやで)
- 87. "Wood Grain" (木目調)
- 88. "Various Stakes and Pegs" (色んなペグ)
- 89. "The Perfect Peg Hammer" (ペグハンマーの鑑)
- 90. "That Fresh-made Taste" (挽きたての味)
- 91. "The Reason for Using Hiragana" (ひらがなの理由)
- 92. "The Resolution of the Debate" (争いの終結)
- 93. "If I Go to Hokkaido" (北海道へ行ったら)
- 94. "A Bigger Izu" (でっかい方の伊豆)
- 95. "Pole-style Body Pillow" (棒型抱き枕)
- 96. "A Way to Stop People From Tripping" (引っかかり防止)
- 97. "Hokuto Urban Legends" (北杜市の都市伝説)
- 98. "Camp Snack Staples" (キャンプの定番おやつ)
- 99. "Nightmares" (嫌な夢)
- 100. "In Commemoration" (記念)
- 101. "How Ena and Rin Met" (えなリンの出会い)
- 102. "Outdoor Kotatsu" (アウトドアこたつ)
- 103. "Chikuwa and Mr. Saitō" (ちくわと斉藤父)
- 104. "You Can Even Eat the Plate" (皿まで食べよう)
- 105. "The Sound of Utensils" (食器の音)
- 106. "Nadeshiko's Payback" (なでしこの仕返し)
- 107. "New Local Cuisine" (新ご当地グルメ)
- 108. "Katsudon" (カツ丼)
- 109. "Legend of Noutori" (農鳥の伝説)
- 110. "Brows Showing Through" (透ける眉毛)
- 111. "The Problem of Over-remixing" (リメイクしすぎ問題)
- 112. "The Rough Map of Yamanashi" (ざっくり山梨マップ)
- 113. "Birthplace of the Inuyama Clan" (犬山一族発祥の地)
- 114. "Outdoor-themed Made-up Kanji" (アウトドア創作漢字)
- 115. "Kanji Creation, Mountain Arc" (創作漢字日本の山編)
- 116. "Rainy Day Off" (雨の休日)

=== Anime ===
Logo of the anime

An animated Room Camp was first seen in the post-credits scene of the episodes of the first season of Laid-Back Camp. In July 2018, producer Shōichi Hotta approached animation producer Ryoji Maru with a project that includes the second season of Laid-Back Camp, a short anime, and a film. In October 2018, the short anime series was announced. In April 2019, Masato Jinbo was announced as the director, Mutsumi Ito as the head of series composition, Mutsumi Sasaki as the character designer and chief animation director, and Laid-Back Camp (2018) director Yoshiaki Kyogoku as the supervisor of the series at C-Station. The series revolves around the idea of a "stamp rally". Ito ensured that viewers would feel as satisfied as they would after viewing an episode of Kuishinbo! Mansai, a weekly Japanese cooking mini-program. The staff did location scouting to feature them in the series. Akiyuki Tateyama composed the series through film scoring, while Asaka performed the ending theme music "The Sunshower" composed by Eri Sasaki. Asaka felt that the theme music gave an "after-school" feeling and described it as a "kind of song that goes well with sunsets".

The series began airing in Japan on AT-X, Tokyo MX, and BS11 on January 6, 2020, and on YBS on January 12. Crunchyroll and Ani-One also streamed the series on its premiere. FuRyu released the series on Blu-ray and DVD in Japan on May 27, 2020. They include a special episode titled "Sauna, Food, and a Three-Wheeler", directed by Kyogoku from a script written by Laid-Back Camp series composition head Jin Tanaka. It was first streamed on YouTube for one day on April 29, 2020, and was added on Crunchyroll on March 4, 2021, and on Ani-One on April 17. In November 2022, the series became available to view on Amazon Prime Video in Japan.

==== Episode list ====
| No. | Title | Original release date |
|---|---|---|
| 1 | "The Mystery of Canned Tuna"; Transliteration: "Tsunakan no Nazo" (Japanese: ツナ缶のなぞ) | January 6, 2020 |
While exploring the items stored in the Outdoors Activities Club room, Nadeshiko Kagamihara spots canned tuna. Assuming its purpose is to distract wild animals, she inadvertently opens a can when Chiaki Ōgaki and Aoi Inuyama arrive, with the former intending to use them to create oil lamps. As they discuss Nadeshiko's Yamanashi background, the trio agree to participate in a stamp rally—an effort to visit and collect stamps at the prefecture's landmarks—to win a year's worth of Minobu steamed buns.
| 2 | "So Many Mt. Fujis"; Transliteration: "Fuji-san ga Takusan" (Japanese: ふじさんがたくさん) | January 13, 2020 |
The Outdoor Activities Club visits the Mount Fuji Heritage Center, where Nadeshiko acquires her first stamp. While Nadeshiko is eating curry in Mount Fuji's form, Chiaki points out the changing shape resembles other Fuji-like mountains in Japan. The rain eventually subsides and the club attempts to observe the real mountain but is unable to due to clouds; instead, the three trace Mount Fuji's outline with their fingers.
| 3 | "Mad Dash! Kawaguchi Lake Rally"; Transliteration: "Gekisō! Kawaguchiko Rarī" (Japanese: 激走！河口湖ラリー) | January 20, 2020 |
For their next stamp, the club is biking along Lake Kawaguchi, a trip in which Chiaki and Aoi struggle to keep up with Nadeshiko. Inspired by cyclists passing by, the three press on until they reach their destination. The club meets a married couple on a cycling trip who reminisces about their travels. Upon completing the stamp, the three remark about creating their memories during the rally.
| 4 | "A Day in Shimarin's Life"; Transliteration: "Aruhi no Shimarin" (Japanese: ある日のしまりん) | January 27, 2020 |
Rin Shima overhears a television program saying those born in December will suffer a surprise attack, which leaves her wary as she goes about her day. After Ena Saitō draws Nadeshiko's face and her hot pot dinner also takes her form, Rin realizes the surprise is Nadeshiko via simulacrum effect.
| 5 | "True Facts: Kachikachi Mountain"; Transliteration: "Shinsetsu・Kachikachiyama" (Japanese: 真説・カチカチ山) | February 3, 2020 |
While riding the Tenjō-Yama Park Mt. Kachi Kachi Ropeway, the club discusses the story of Kachi-kachi Yama. However, they also add elements from "The Tortoise and the Hare" and conclude with a happy ending, confusing others in the cable cars.
| 6 | "Both of Us, Back in the Day"; Transliteration: "Ano koro wa, Futari tomo" (Japanese: あのころは、ふたりとも) | February 10, 2020 |
As they continue collecting stamps, Aoi and Chiaki recall aspects of their childhood and early friendship at various stamp locations.
| 7 | "Operation Hōtō"; Transliteration: "Hōtō Chōri Daisakusen" (Japanese: ほうとう調理大作戦) | February 17, 2020 |
Nadeshiko loses her stamp rally sheet, so Chiaki makes hōtō to cheer her up. While cooking, the club discusses hōtō variations before eating. Meanwhile, Rin's grandfather finds the stamp sheet on the side of the road.
| 8 | "Lies Spread 'Round the World"; Transliteration: "Hora wa Sekai wo Koete" (Japanese: ホラは世界を越えて) | February 24, 2020 |
Until she can recover her rally sheet, Nadeshiko improvises by stamping her notepad. After collecting another stamp, the club visits a foot bath where Aoi tells supposed legends about the water and location. Although her tales attract the attention of another bather, Nadeshiko and Chiaki quickly catch on to her lies. In an attempt to emulate her, Nadeshiko tries lying in a Kansai dialect, only for Aoi to tell yet another falsehood about the dialect being popular for legends. At the Shima household, Rin's grandfather drops off the stamp rally sheet.
| 9 | "Shizunashi War II"; Transliteration: "Shizunashi no Ran II" (Japanese: 静梨の乱 II) | March 2, 2020 |
At a grocery store, Chiaki spots a caricature of Mount Fuji and points out the outline is based on its perspective from the Yamanashi prefecture; as a result, she proclaims it to be a "victory" for that region. The club later goes to buy tuna bowls for lunch, where Aoi notes Yamanashi is the second-largest consumer of tuna in Japan, with Shizuoka Prefecture at the top. Nadeshiko is asked to pick between the two prefectures but compares herself to Mount Fuji as she is connected to both.
| 10 | "Scary Ice Caves"; Transliteration: "Hyōketsu Kowai" (Japanese: 氷穴こわい) | March 9, 2020 |
Chiaki decides to film the club during their adventures, but during a test of courage, they encounter a cult surrounding a fireplace; as it turns out, the video was a proposed horror mockumentary. The three enter the Narusawa Ice Cave, where Nadeshiko is separated from the others. Her fear amplified by the video concept, she runs out of the cave and into the forest, where she encounters Rin and receives her stamp rally sheet.
| 11 | "End of the Journey"; Transliteration: "Tabi no Owari" (Japanese: 旅のおわり) | March 16, 2020 |
The club completes their stamp rally by visiting the Misato Noyu hot spring. While relaxing, Chiaki reveals the rally was organized in advance by her and Aoi, though Nadeshiko was already aware. Nevertheless, she comments she enjoyed the journey before asking for the year's worth of steamed buns. As they leave the hot spring, Nadeshiko suggests they go camping again.
| 12 | "Room Camp"; Transliteration: "Heya Kyan" (Japanese: へや キャン) | March 23, 2020 |
Back at school, the club is camping when Nadeshiko asks why Chiaki and Aoi created the stamp rally, to which they explain they wanted her to visit and experience Yamanashi's landmarks that they grew up with. The next morning, Nadeshiko proclaims she had formed her stamp rally for the club to participate, beginning with the clubroom.
| Special | "Sauna, Food, and a Three-Wheeler"; Transliteration: "Sauna to Gohan to Sanrin Bike" (Japanese: サウナとごはんと三輪バイク) | April 29, 2020 |
Rin discovers a three-wheeled motorcycle when she returns home. Her father informs her of her scooter's annual inspection and gives her the motorcycle for her next camping trip. Rin visits a sauna, eats a tempura set meal, and goes grocery shopping on her way to a campsite.

=== Live action ===
In March 2021, a live-action adaptation of the manga series was announced to be airing alongside the second season of the live-action version of Laid-Back Camp.
