= Yumiri Hanamori =

Japanese voice actress

- 花守 ゆみり
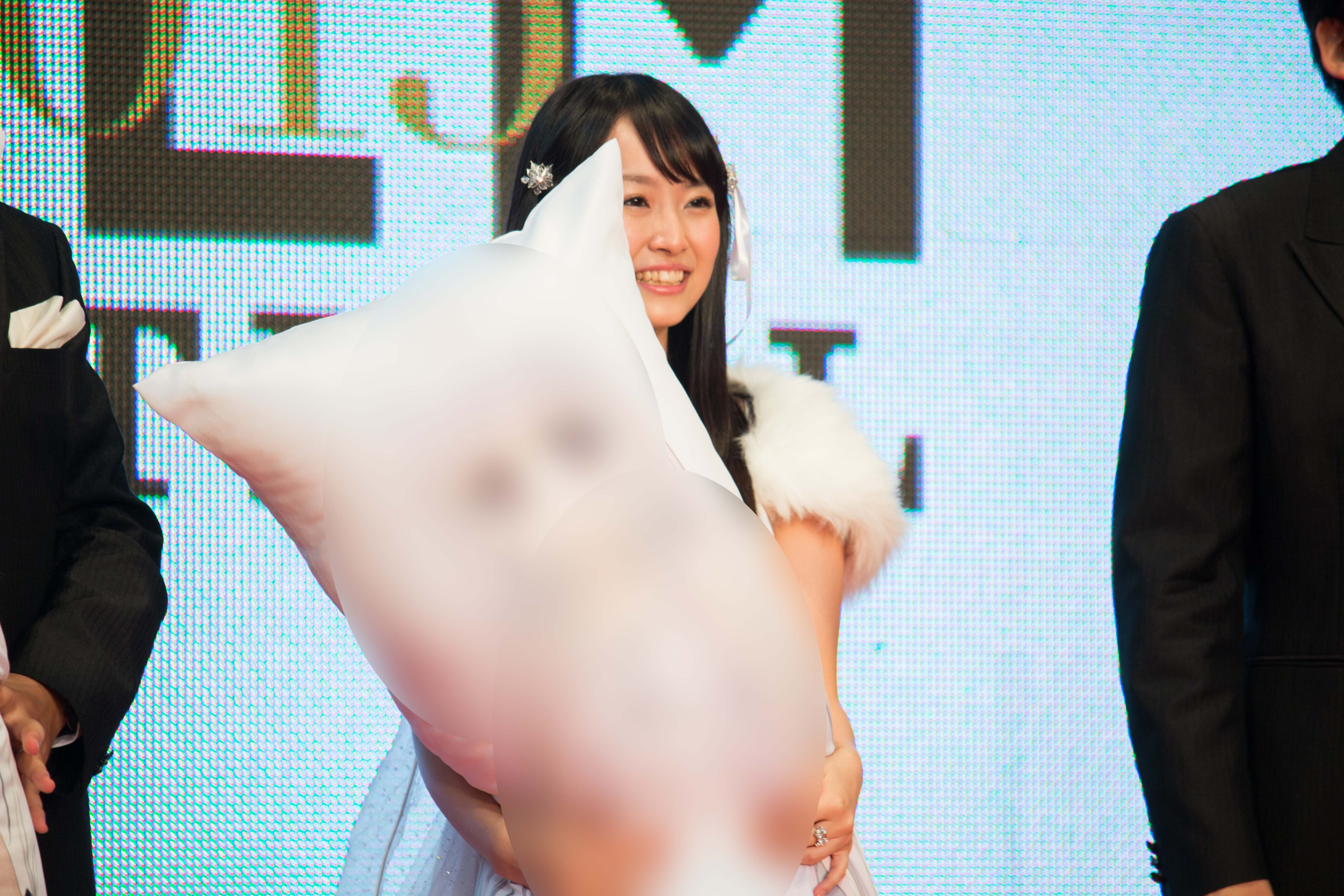
- Hanamori at the 28th Tokyo International Film Festival Opening Ceremony
- Born: September 29, 1997 (age 29); Kanagawa Prefecture, Japan
- Occupation: Voice actress
- Years active: 2013–present
- Agents: Pony Canyon Artists / Swallow (former); m&i (2017–2022); tomorrow jam (2023-present)
- Height: 157 cm (5 ft 2 in)

Yumiri Hanamori (花守 ゆみり, Hanamori Yumiri; born September 29, 1997) is a Japanese voice actress. She used the alias Rimiyu (りみゆ) – her given name in an anagram – in her debut, "The Second Audition".

== Career ==
Hanamori became interested in acting during her second year in high school.

In 2015, she served as the 62nd personality of Radio Flush. In 2016, Hanamori made her anime film debut in Garakowa: Restore the World, where she voiced Remo, the female protagonist. On October 22, 2015, Hanamori walked through the red carpet with producer Masashi Ishihama and writer Ryoichi Ishihara as a part of the Garakowa voice cast at the Tokyo International Film Festival.

Hanamori was affiliated to Pony Canyon Artists / Swallow. In 2017, she switched her affiliation to m&i. On November 1, 2019, it was announced that Hanamori would be "graduating" from Re:Stage! due to a knee injury.

On July 10, 2022, Hanamori tested positive for COVID-19.

== Filmography ==
=== Anime series ===
- Aiura (2013), Sōta Amaya
- Ace of Diamond (2013–2015), Sachiko Umemoto
- Sakura Trick (2014), Ai Kawatō
- Yuki Yuna Is a Hero (2014), Female Student – ep. 3
- Rolling Girls (2015), Chiaya Misono
- Ace of Diamond Second Season (2015–2016), Sachiko Umemoto
- Etotama (2015), Uritan
- Lance N' Masques (2015), Sae Igarashi
- Yuruyuri San Hai! (2015), Female Student – ep. 10–11
- Anne Happy (2016), Anne Hanakoizumi/Hanako
- Rilu Rilu Fairilu (2016–2017), Lip
- Magical Girl Raising Project (2016), Nemurin – ep. 1–2
- Scorching Ping Pong Girls (2016), Koyori Tsumujikaze
- Grimoire of Zero (2017), Zero
- The Idolmaster Cinderella Girls Theater (2017), Shin Sato
- Two Car (2017), Kurosu Itō
- Yuki Yuna is a Hero: The Washio Sumi Chapter (2017), Gin Minowa
- Laid-Back Camp (2018–2024), Nadeshiko Kagamihara
- Overlord II (2018), Evileye
- Caligula (2018), Shounen Doll
- Seven Senses of the Re'Union (2018), Nozomi Kusaka
- Happy Sugar Life (2018), Asahi Kōbe
- Overlord III (2018), Evileye
- That Time I Got Reincarnated as a Slime (2018–2019), Shizu
- Radiant (2018–2020), Seth
- Merc Storia: The Apathetic Boy and the Girl in a Bottle (2018), Toto
- The Price of Smiles (2019), Yūki Soleil
- Pastel Memories (2019), Nao Mejiro
- Kaguya-sama: Love Is War (2019–2022), Ai Hayasaka
- Bakumatsu Crisis (2019), Mori Ranmaru
- Hachigatsu no Cinderella Nine (2019), Akane Ukita
- Re:Stage! Dream Days♪ (2019), Haruka Itsumura
- Arifureta: From Commonplace to World's Strongest (2019–present), Shizuku Yaegashi
- Kochoki: Wakaki Nobunaga (2019), Kichō
- Demon Slayer: Kimetsu no Yaiba, (2019), Hinaki Ubuyashiki
- Cautious Hero: The Hero Is Overpowered but Overly Cautious, (2019), Rosalie Roseguard
- Darwin's Game (2020), Sui/Sōta
- Keep Your Hands Off Eizouken! (2020), Doumeki
- Heya Camp (2020), Nadeshiko Kagamihara
- Smile Down the Runway (2020), Chiyuki Fujito
- Iwa-Kakeru! Sport Climbing Girls (2020), Maruno Satō
- One Room Third Season (2020), Saya Orisaki
- Our Last Crusade or the Rise of a New World (2020), Rin Vispose
- Akudama Drive (2020), Execution Division Pupil
- Magatsu Wahrheit -Zuerst- (2020), Shake
- Warlords of Sigrdrifa (2020), young Odin
- Otherside Picnic (2021), Sorao Kamikoshi
- Suppose a Kid from the Last Dungeon Boonies Moved to a Starter Town (2021), Lloyd Belladonna
- Kemono Jihen (2021), Kon
- Tropical-Rouge! Pretty Cure (2021), Sango Suzumura/Cure Coral
- Shadows House (2021), Sophie
- Seven Knights Revolution: Hero Successor (2021), Leda
- Kageki Shojo!! (2021), Ai Narata
- The Detective Is Already Dead (2021), Hel
- Megaton Musashi (2021), Haruki Kitane
- Blue Period (2021), Ryuji Ayukawa
- Mieruko-chan (2021), Kyōsuke Yotsuya
- The Fruit of Evolution (2021), Airi Seto
- Tokyo 24th Ward (2022), Kana Shishido
- Kotaro Lives Alone (2022), Ayano Kobayashi
- The Dawn of the Witch (2022), Mysterious Witch
- Don't Hurt Me, My Healer! (2022), Ryoko
- Date A Live IV (2022), Nibelcole
- Smile of the Arsnotoria the Animation (2022), Voynii
- Call of the Night (2022), Akira Asai
- Eternal Boys (2022), Ren Ukita
- Bibliophile Princess (2022), Lilia
- Is It Wrong to Try to Pick Up Girls in a Dungeon? IV (2023), Alise Lovell
- Handyman Saitō in Another World (2023), Lilyza
- Junji Ito Maniac: Japanese Tales of the Macabre (2023), Tsukiko Izumisawa
- The Reincarnation of the Strongest Exorcist in Another World (2023), Seika Lamprogue
- Trigun Stampede (2023), Young Knives
- Boruto: Naruto Next Generations (2023), Daemon
- Hell's Paradise: Jigokuraku (2023), Yamada Asaemon Sagiri
- Too Cute Crisis (2023), Liza Luna
- My Tiny Senpai (2023), Chinatsu Hayakawa
- The Dreaming Boy Is a Realist (2023), Kei Ashida
- Undead Girl Murder Farce (2023), Vera
- Helck (2023), Sharuami
- Shangri-La Frontier (2023), Psyger-100
- Akuma-kun (2023), Mio Kazama
- Ron Kamonohashi's Forbidden Deductions (2023), Winter Moriarty
- Hokkaido Gals Are Super Adorable! (2024), Sayuri Akino
- Ishura (2024), Lana the Moon Tempest
- Blue Archive the Animation (2024), Hoshino Takanashi
- Rising Impact (2024), Lancelot Norman
- Magilumiere Magical Girls Inc. (2024), Hitomi Koshigaya
- Puniru Is a Cute Slime (2024), Alice Okanega
- The Seven Deadly Sins: Four Knights of the Apocalypse Season 2 (2024), Io
- Aquarion: Myth of Emotions (2025), Sakko Ōtori
- Promise of Wizard (2025), Akira Masaki
- Sorairo Utility (2025), Izumi Akina
- Umamusume: Cinderella Gray (2025), Dicta Striker
- Gachiakuta (2025), Riyo
- The Summer Hikaru Died (2025), Asako Yamagishi
- With You and the Rain (2025), Wako
- Sword of the Demon Hunter: Kijin Gentōshō (2025), Kaneomi
- Cat's Eye (2025), Ai Kisugi
- Inexpressive Kashiwada and Expressive Oota (2025), Tabuchi
- Scum of the Brave (2026), Sara Kashiwagi Pendragon
- The Villainess Is Adored by the Prince of the Neighbor Kingdom (2026), Akari
- Onegai AiPri (2026), Choco and Gamuto Tomosaka
- The World Is Dancing (2026), Oniyasha
- Young Ladies Don't Play Fighting Games (2026), Hana Ichinose

=== Anime films ===
- Garakowa: Restore the World (2016), Remo
- Yuki Yuna is a Hero: Washio Sumi Chapter (2017), Gin
- Laid-Back Camp Movie (2022), Nadeshiko Kagamihara
- Kaguya-sama: Love Is War – The First Kiss That Never Ends (2022), Ai Hayasaka
- Rakudai Majo: Fūka to Yami no Majo (2023), Karen
- Whoever Steals This Book (2025), Takayama

=== Video games ===
- Crusader Quest (2015), Popo
- MapleStory (2015), Dolphy
- Rebellion Blade (2015), Amu
- Yuki Yuna is a Hero: Memory of the Forest (2015), Gin Minowa
- The Caligula Effect (2016), Shonen-Doll
- The Idolmaster Cinderella Girls (2016), Shin Sato
- Alternative Girls (2017), Hina Momoi
- Blue Reflection (2017), Ako Ichinose
- Yuki Yuna is a Hero: Hanayui no Kirameki (2017), Gin Minowa
- Girl's Frontline (2018), A-91 & Cx4 Storm
- Azur Lane (2018), HMS Matchless, HMS Musketeer
- Dragalia Lost (2018), Fleur
- Our World is Ended (2019), Tatiana
- Dragon: Marked for Death (2019), Witch (Voice D)
- Fire Emblem: Three Houses (2019), Mercedes
- Gunvolt Chronicles: Luminous Avenger iX (2019), Kohaku
- Arknights (2019), Ifrit
- Epic Seven (2019), Yufine
- Ash Arms (2019), T-34, SBD-3 Dauntless.
- Fire Emblem Heroes (2019), Mercedes, Tanya, Innes (child)
- Cytus 2 (2020), NEKO#ΦωΦ
- KonoSuba: Fantastic Days (2020), Lean
- Sangokushi Hadou (2020), Guan Yinping
- Granblue Fantasy (2020), Risette
- Fate/Grand Order (2020), Captain Nemo
- ALTDEUS: Beyond Chronos (2020), Noa
- Blue Archive (2021), Takanashi Hoshino
- Grandchase (2021), Lapis
- Genshin Impact (2021), Yanfei
- Toaru Majutsu no Index: Imaginary Fest (2021), Mitsuari Ayu
- Laid-Back Camp - Virtual - Lake Motosu (2021), Nadeshiko Kagamihara
- Gate of Nightmares (2021-2022), Luisa / Chloe
- SoulWorker (2016-2022), Dhana Opini
- Heaven Burns Red (2022), Yuina Shirakawa
- Soul Hackers 2 (2022), Tatara
- Path to Nowhere (2022), Hecate
- Guardian Tales (2023), Hana
- 404 Game Re:set (2023), Space Harrier
- TEVI (2023), Fray
- Honkai Impact 3rd (2024), Lantern
- League of Legends (2025), Yunara
- Tokyo Afterschool Summoners (2026), Hel

=== Radio ===
- Etotama Radio: Soruraru Kurenya (2014-2016)
- Radio Dot I Hanamori Yumiri no Ironna Yumiri wo Mite Yumiri (* '▽`*) (2015)
- Yumiri to Aina no Mogumogu Communications (2016-ongoing)
- Anne Happy Shiawase Radio (2016)
- Shūkan Chotto Kowai Hanashi (2016)
- Mahōsōjo Ikusei Keikaku SIDE D (2016-2017)
- Zero no Sho Radio Zeroraji! (2017-ongoing)

=== Drama CD ===
- Strike Witches: Suomus Misfits Squadron ReBOOT! (2018), Haruka Sakomizu
- My Stepmom's Daughter Is My Ex (2020), Isana Higashira

=== Dubbing ===
==== Live-action ====
- The Legend of Ochi, Yuri (Helena Zengel)
- Mortal Kombat II (film), Kitana (Adeline Rudolph)

==== Animation ====
- Batwheels, Red
