= Snow Flower (film) =

2019 Japanese romance film

- Poster
- 雪の華
- Directed by: Kojiro Hashimoto
- Written by: Yoshikazu Okada
- Based on: Yuki no Hana by Mika Nakashima
- Produced by: Toshihisa Watai; Ikumi Taguchi
- Starring: Hiroomi Tosaka; Ayami Nakajo
- Cinematography: Yoshinori Oshima
- Edited by: Koji Hara
- Music by: Taro Hakase
- Production company: A FILMS
- Distributed by: Warner Bros. Pictures
- Release date: February 1, 2019
- Running time: 125 minutes
- Country: Japan
- Language: Japanese
- Box office: ¥1.12 billion

Snow Flower (雪の華, Yuki no Hana) is a 2019 Japanese romance film directed by Kojiro Hashimoto from a screenplay by Yoshikazu Okada, with inspiration from Mika Nakashima's song of the same title, which was also used as the theme song of the film. It stars Hiroomi Tosaka and Ayami Nakajo, with Saki Takaoka, Kenta Hamano, Yumena Yanai, Masahiro Ezaki, and Seiichi Tanabe in supporting roles. The story is of a romance between Miyuki, who finds out that she has a limited amount of time left to live, and Yusuke, a young man dreams of becoming a glass artist. It was released in Japan on February 1, 2019. It grossed ¥1.12 billion yen in total.

== Content ==
Miyuki has been ill since she was a child and is finally told that she has only one year to live. She has given up on everything, but when she becomes the victim of a snatch and grab after she left the hospital where she has been told the news, she is drawn to a man who saves her by chance. Six months later, she meets him again by chance. His name is Yusuke, and he is raising his siblings on his own while trying to become a glass artist. When Miyuki learns that the café where Yusuke works is in financial crisis, she summons the courage up to ask him to be her lover for one month in exchange for one million yen. The two gradually fall in love for real, and when Yusuke learns the truth about Miyuki's health, he tries his best to achieve Miyuki's last wish.

== Cast ==
- Hiroomi Tosaka as Yusuke Watahiki, a young man who works as a cafe to raise his siblings on his own. He dreams of becoming a glass artist.
- Ayami Nakajo as Miyuki Hirai, a girl who has been ill since she was a child. Despite being told that she has only one year to live, she still dreams of seeing aurora in Finland for once.
- Saki Takaoka as Miyuki's mother Reiko Hirai, who cares deeply for her daughter.
- Seiichi Tanabe as Wakamura, a doctor who cares for Miyuki's health and supports her so that she can live her life without regrets.
- Kenta Hamano as Iwanaga, a senior staff member at the café where Yusuke works.
- Yumena Yanai as Yusuke's younger sister Hatsumi Watahiki.
- Masahiro Ezaki as Yusuke's younger brother Kosuke Watahiki.
- So Yamanaka as Miyuki's father.

== Production ==
Snow Flower is inspired by Mika Nakashima's famous song of the same title, while Yoshikazu Okada wrote an original story with the image of the song. Approximately half of the film was shot in Finland, and the main cast made two trips to Finland to shoot the scenes of different seasons in Finland in February and June 2018. With a temperature of minus 15 °C in the February of Levi, Finland, the crew and cast experienced a difficult shooting. To capture the aurora borealis scenes in the film, the crew shot about 10 times from 8 am and about 10 times from 2 pm and the battle against time lasted 4 or 5 days. The scene where Miyuki waits for the aurora was shot in Elves' Hideaway Village, which offers more natural scenes of snowfields. Director Kojiro Hashimoto chose the location with the image of Miyuki coming to the "farthest reaches of the earth" to see the aurora. He also thought that the village, without modern facilities for skiing, would create the right atmosphere that made it seem impossible for a young woman to come alone, and thus showed the determination of Miyuki.

== Release ==
The film had its premiere at Tokyo Dome City Hall in Tokyo on January 24, 2019, and opened in Japan on February 1 of the same year.

=== Marketing ===
On February 27, 2018, a film project starring Hiroomi Tosaka and Ayami Nakajo was announced, revealing that they have just finished shooting in Finland, and would come back to Finland in June. On June 28, the project was announced to be a live-action film of Mika Nakashima's "Snow Flower", while the main cast and crew were also announced. On August 30, the film announced that it would be released on February 1, 2019. On October 11, it was announced that Taro Hakase would compose for the film.

A novel version of the story, written by writer Yoshikazu Okada and Kei Kunii, was released on February 27, 2018. On January 18, a visual illustration of the film by manga artist Riyoko Ikeda was released. The film premiered On January 24, 2019, with Hiroomi Tosaka, Ayami Nakajo and Mika Nakashima attending. Mika Nakashima sang "Yuki no Hana" at the premiere. On February 1, the release date of the film, another visual illustration of the film by manga artist Arina Tanemura was released. A stage greetings event was held on February 2, and Hiroomi Tosaka, Ayami Nakajo attended the event with director Kojiro Hashimoto.

== Reception ==
=== Box office ===
The film earned more than ¥280 thousand yen on its opening weekend with 230 thousand audiences. 70% of its first weekend audiences were female, while most male audiences were around 20 and saw the film on a date with their female partner. It earned a total of ¥1.12 billion yen at the Japanese box office, becoming the 35th highest-grossing Japanese film released that year in the country.

=== Critical response ===
The film had generally positive reviews, with Mika Nakashima praising that "I was moved by the fact that the song I sang was portrayed as such a pure love story." Film critic Akira Kubota described the film as a film that would make you cry, while radio personality Kelly Ryusuke also pointed out that the music by Taro Hakase is "a plus, and as the music accompanies and embraces the hero and heroine, it was just wonderful."
