= Yumena Yanai =

Japanese actress and model (born 2000)

- 箭内夢菜
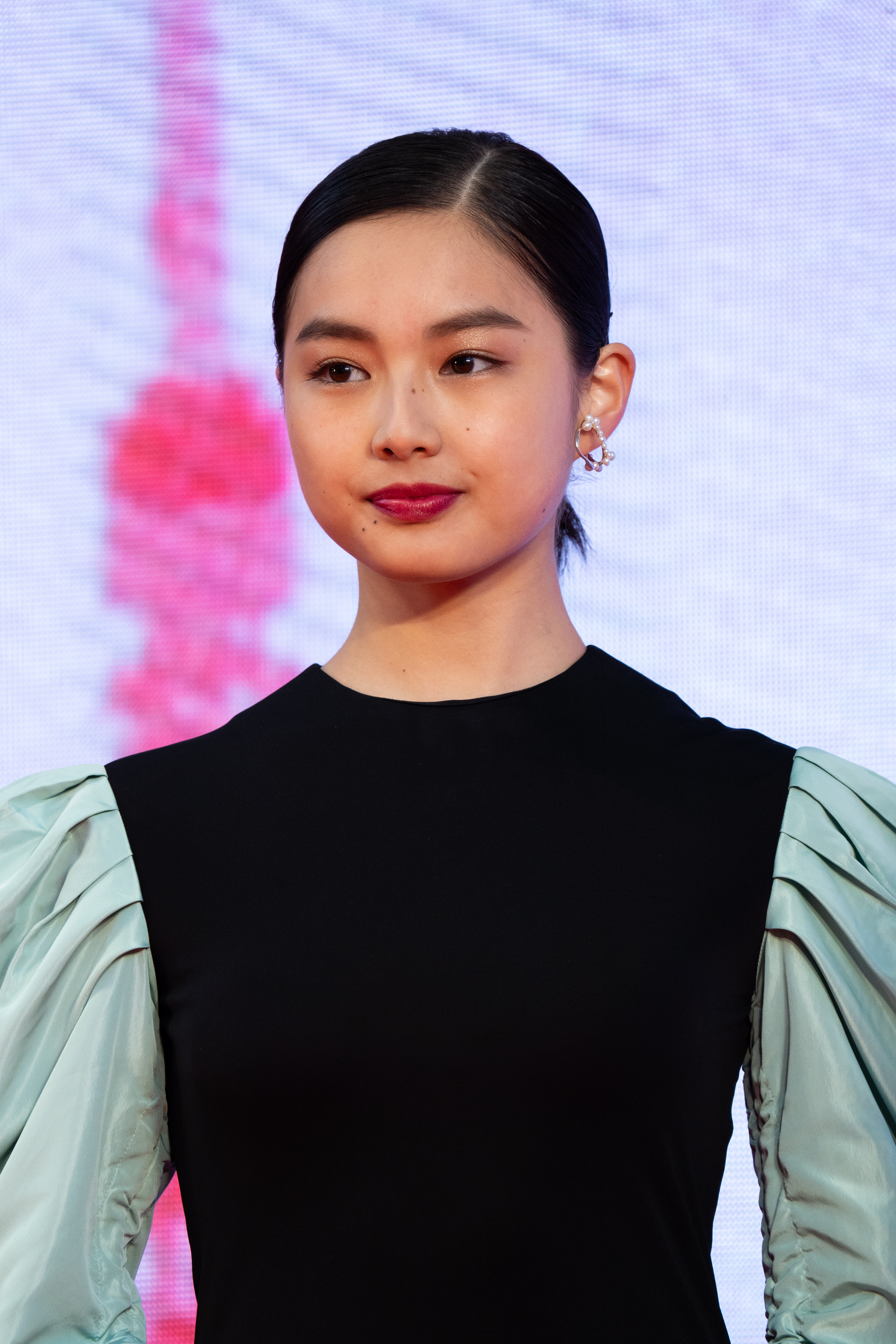
- Yanai in October 2019
- Born: June 21, 2000 (age 26); Kōriyama, Fukushima Prefecture, Japan
- Other name: Yumeppe (夢っぺ)
- Occupations: Actress; model
- Years active: 2017–present
- Agent: Irving
- Modeling information
- Height: 164 cm (5 ft 5 in)
- Hair color: black
- Eye color: brown

Yumena Yanai (箭内 夢菜, Yanai Yūmena; June 21, 2000), is a Japanese actress and model. She is signed under the talent agency Irving.

== Biography ==
Yanai was born on June 21, 2000, in Kōriyama City, Fukushima Prefecture. She is the eldest of four siblings, with two younger brothers and one younger sister.

== Career ==
In 2016, Yanai participated in the "Miss Seventeen 2016" exclusive model audition for Seventeen magazine, in which she was selected as one of the 20 finalists from a total of 6,103 candidates. In the same year, Yanai was scouted by an entertainment agency while out in Harajuku. In October, she joined the talent agency Irving, and was selected as the cover model for "Fukushima Bishojo Zukan" and for a commercial.

In 2017, she again took part in the "Miss Seventeen 2017" pageant and this time became the grand prize winner out of 5,981 candidates and became an exclusive model for the said magazine. A year later in July 2018, she made her debut as an actress in the television drama Let's Go Jets! as Honoka Tachibana.

In 2019, she appeared in the thriller and mystery drama Mr. Hiiragi's Homeroom as a student named Yuki Misaki. Yanai also appeared in the drama Where Did My Skirt Go? as Momo Horie. Yanai made her first film appearance in the movie Snow Flower released on February 1 of the same year. On December 8, she made a guest appearance in the ninth episode of the afternoon drama Nippon Noir: Detective Y's Rebellion, playing the role of Yuki Misaki, the character she played in Mr. Hiiragi's Homeroom. In 2020, she launched her own YouTube channel called "Yumena Yanai's Dream" (箭内夢菜のユメ).

In 2020, Yanai played the role of Aoi Inuyama in the live-action television adaptation of the manga Laid-Back Camp. This work soon became a big hit with both the television audience and readers of the original work for its "faithful portrayal" of the storyline in the manga, so much so that a special drama was produced in March 2021 and a second season was produced in April of that year. In July, she also appeared in the drama's Midsummer Boy: 19452020 in TV Asahi and Koto no Hana.

In 2021, Yanai was appointed as the "Degawa Girl" of Sekai no Hate Made Itte Q!. In March, she "graduated" as an exclusive model for the women's fashion magazine Seventeen after over three and a half years with the brand. In April of the same year, she played her first leading role in a film in the movie Two in Space, the film was released in theaters two years later in October 2023. Yanai also portrayed the lead role of Hana Morimura in the serial teen drama The High School Heroes.

In April 2023, she appeared in the Sunday drama Passion for Punchlines as the protagonist's older sister, Mai Wakabayashi, marking her second prime-time drama appearance in four years since Where Did My Skirt Go? in 2019. In October of the same year, she appeared in the Tuesday drama My Second Aoharu as the main lead's classmate, Sumika Asada, also making her first attempt in portraying a gal role.

In April 2024, Yanai played the role of Nishio Futaba in the television drama 9 Border. In the following year in May 2025, she played her first lead role as Kotori Ogata in the drama I Fell in Love With The Hypothermic Boy.

== Filmography ==
=== Film ===
Year	Title	Role	Notes	Ref.
2019	Snow Flower	Hatsumi Watabiki		
2019	High&Low The Worst	Yui Ueda		
2019	Dark School Rules	Kirarin Uesaka		
2019	He Won't Kill, She Won't Die	Yamato Nadeshiko		
2021	Two in Space	Yume	Lead role; anthology film	
2021	My Heart Beats Because of You	Yayoi Hoshikawa		
2022	The Violence Action	Rika		
2023	And Yet, You Are So Sweet	Hina		
2023	You Made My Dawn	Sayaka		
2024	Blue Period	Miki Kinemi		
2025	A Bad Summer	Rika		

=== Television ===
Year	Title	Role	Notes	Ref.
2018	We Are Rockets!	Honoka Tachibana		
2018	Small River, Ryoma Comes	as Herself		
2019	Mr. Hiiragi's Homeroom	Yuki Misaki		
2019	Where Did My Skirt Go?	Momo Horie		
2019	Dark School Rules	Kirarin Uesaka		
2019	Nippon Noir: Detective Y's Rebellion	Yuki Misaki		
2020	Laid-Back Camp	Aoi Inuyama		
2020	Midsummer Boy: 19452020	Akina Koizumi		
2020	Kotonoha	Ayumi Sato		
2021	The High School Heroes	Hana Morimura		
2021	Solomon's Perjury	Yukiko Dobashi	Episodes 1 and 8	
2021	True Horror Stories: The Seven Mysteries of a Certain School	Yuna Nakamura		
2022	Tomorrow, I'll Be Someone's Girlfriend	Moe Maya		
2022	Solo Girls, Activity Recommendation 2	"Airsoft Girl"		
2022	Swim! Carp	Reiko Watanabe		
2022	Cinderella Again	Kaori Ito		
2023	Passion for Punchlines	Mai Wakabayashi		
2023	My Second Aoharu	Sumika Asada		
2024	9 Border	Nishio Futaba		
2025	I Fell in Love With The Hypothermic Boy	Kotori Ogata		
2026	Mirai's Future Son	Rio Suzuki		
2026	Too Many Lovers, Too Many Murders	Rei Kenmochi		
2026	I Killed My Husband	Elena Kikuchi		
