= Nozomi Yamamoto =

Japanese voice actress (born 1988)

- 山本 希望
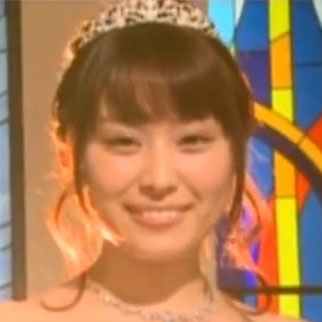
- Born: August 9, 1988 (age 38); Misawa, Aomori, Japan
- Other name: Nojo
- Occupations: Voice actress, rapper
- Years active: 2010–present
- Agent: VIMS
- Children: 1

Nozomi Yamamoto (山本 希望, Yamamoto Nozomi; born August 9, 1988) is a Japanese voice actress and rapper affiliated with VIMS.

== Personal life ==
Yamamoto married in January 2020. In January 2023, Yamamoto announced her pregnancy.

== Voice acting roles ==
=== Anime television series ===
2011

- Haganai as Yukimura Kusunoki
- Un-Go as Rie Kaishō

2012

- Girls und Panzer as Satoko Nakajima
- Joshiraku as Tetora Bōhatei
- K as Sakura Asama
- Sword Art Online as Announcer; Yolko
- Tsuritama as Erika Usami

2013

- Arpeggio of Blue Steel ~Ars Nova~ as I-402
- Haganai NEXT as Yukimura Kusunoki
- Genshiken Nidaime as Chika Ogiue
- Love Live! as Fumiko
- Pretty Rhythm: Rainbow Live as Ai Jōzenji, Coolun, Cosmo Hōjō, Sexiny
- Sunday Without God as Muu
- Super Seisyun Brothers as Shinmoto Chiko
- Tanken Driland: Sennen no Mahō as Beast Goddess Gracia

2014

- Captain Earth as Ai
- PriPara as Cosmo Hōjō
- Wake Up, Girls! as Moka Suzuki
- A Good Librarian Like a Good Shepherd as Senri Misono
- Yona of the Dawn as Sū Won (young), Ao

2015

- Absolute Duo as Julie Sigtuna
- Sky Wizards Academy as Misora Whitale
- The Idolmaster Cinderella Girls as Rika Jōgasaki
- Utawarerumono: The False Faces as Nosuri

2016

- Aokana: Four Rhythm Across the Blue as Mashiro Arisaka
- Schwarzesmarken as Irisdina Bernhard

2017

- Schoolgirl Strikers as Ryoko Shinonome
- A Sister's All You Need as Chihiro Hashima

2018

- Senran Kagura Shinovi Master as Rasetsu

2019

- Why the Hell are You Here, Teacher!? as Chizuru Tachibana

2020

- Hypnosis Mic: Division Rap Battle: Rhyme Anima as Nemu Aohitsugi
- Umayon as Yukino Bijin

2021

- Gekidol as Aki Asagi
- Gunma-chan as Kiryū-san

2022

- Utawarerumono: Mask of Truth as Nosuri

2025

- The Gorilla God's Go-To Girl as Carissa
- There's No Freaking Way I'll be Your Lover! Unless... as Michiru Hirosaki

2026

- The Daily Life of a Part-time Torturer as Berta

=== Original video animation (OVA) ===
2011

- Boku wa Tomodachi ga Sukunai as Yukimura Kusunoki

2018

- Umamusume: Pretty Derby – BNW's Oath as Yukino Bijin

2021

- Alice in Deadly School as Yumiya Akashima

=== Original net animation (ONA) ===
2022

- Umayuru as Yukino Bijin

=== Anime films ===
- Wake Up, Girls! - Seven Idols as Moka Suzuki
- Laid-Back Camp Movie as Shizuka Kagamihara
- Umamusume: Pretty Derby – Beginning of a New Era as Yukino Bijin

=== Video games ===
- Gal Gun as Aoi Uno
- Granblue Fantasy as Razia
- Girls' Frontline as AR70, EVO 3, G28
- Schoolgirl Strikers as Ryoko Shinonome
- Secret of Mana (2018) as Primm
- Yuki Yuna is a Hero: Hanayui no Kirameki as Natsume Kohagura
- Azur Lane as Wichita, Hornet, Hornet II, Akatsuki
- Ys VIII: Lacrimosa of Dana as Ricotta
- Sid Story as Chaerin
- Arknights as Estelle
- Umamusume: Pretty Derby as Yukino Bijin
- No More Heroes III as Kimmy Love / Dr. Juvenile
- Blaster Master Zero 3 as Jennifer Gardner
- The Legend of Heroes: Trails Through Daybreak as Viola
- Honkai Impact 3rd as Pardofelis
- Omega Labyrinth Life as Juri Minase
- Reverse: 1999 as Regulus
- Livestream 2: Escape from Togaezuka Happy Place as Miyabi Himemiya

=== Dubbing ===
- Crisis on Earth-X as Amaya Jiwe / Vixen (Maisie Richardson-Sellers)
