= C-Station =

Japanese animation studio

C-Station Co., Ltd.
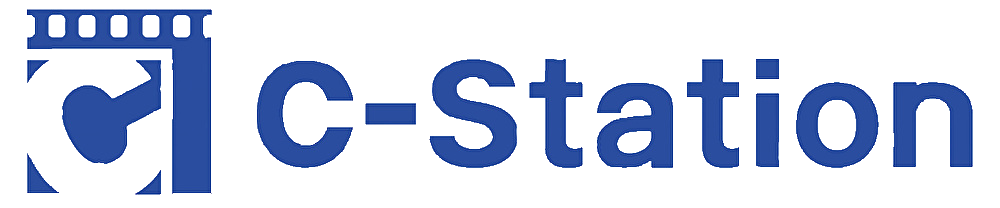
- Native name: シーステイション株式会社
- Romanized name: Shīsuteishon Kabushiki-gaisha
- Type: Kabushiki gaisha
- Industry: Japanese animation
- Founded: August 2009; 17 years ago
- Headquarters: Honcho, Kokubunji, Tokyo, Japan
- Key people: Ryoji Maru (representative director)
- Number of employees: 41 (as of June 2017)
- Parent: Bee Train Production (2009–2012)
- Divisions: Digital (Note: C-Station Digital, the studio's compositing and digital effects department.)
- Website: www.cstation.jp

C-Station Co., Ltd. (Japanese: シーステイション株式会社, Hepburn: Shīsuteishon Kabushiki-gaisha) is a Japanese animation studio established in 2009 as an extension of Bee Train Production and chaired by Ryoji Maru, a former producer and production manager for Bee Train.

In 2012, C-Station split from Bee Train and in 2013, it was announced that it would be animating the series Dragonar Academy, making it their first produced show.

== Works ==
=== Television series ===
Year	Title	Director(s)	Animation producer(s)	Source	Eps.	Refs.
2014	Dragonar Academy	Shunsuke Tada	Ryoji Maru	Light novel	12	
2015–2019	Star-Myu	Shunsuke Tada	Ryoji Maru	Original work	36	
2018	Hakyū Hoshin Engi	Masahiro Aizawa (as Kagetsu Aizawa)	Ryoji Maru	Manga	23	
2018–2021	Laid-Back Camp	Yoshiaki Kyougoku	Ryoji Maru	Manga	25	
2020	Heya Camp	Masato Jinbo	Ryoji Maru	Manga	12	
2023	Opus Colors	Shunsuke Tada	Ryoji Maru	Original work	12	
2024	Kinokoinu: Mushroom Pup	Kagetoshi Asano	TBA	Manga	12	
2026	Let's Go Kaikigumi	Yutaka Hirata	TBA	Manga	TBA	

=== Films ===
Year	Title	Director(s)	Animation producer(s)	Source	Refs.
2022	Laid-Back Camp Movie	Yoshiaki Kyougoku	Ryoji Maru	Manga	

=== OVA/ONAs ===
Year	Title	Director(s)	Animation producer(s)	Source	Eps.	Refs.
2014	Akame ga Kill! Theater	Masafumi Tamura; Shunsuke Itou	—N/a	Light novel	24	
2016–2018	Star-Myu	Shunsuke Tada	Ryoji Maru	Original work	2	
2018–2021	Laid-Back Camp	Yoshiaki Kyougoku	Ryoji Maru	Manga	5	

== Notable staff ==
=== Representative staff ===
- Ryoji Maru (founder and president)

=== Animators ===
- Yoshimitsu Yamashita
- Mutsumi Sasaki (animator)
