= List of Laid-Back Camp episodes =

Title logo of the anime series

Laid-Back Camp is a Japanese manga series written and illustrated by Afro, which was later adapted into an anime series. It follows Rin Shima in her solo camping when she encounters Nadeshiko Kagamihara, whom she later inspires to enjoy camping.

The series debuted on AT-X, with the first season aired from January 4 to March 22, 2018, and consists of 12 episodes. The second season aired from January 7 to April 1, 2021, and consists of 13 episodes. The third season aired from April 4 to June 20, 2024, and consists of 12 episodes. The fourth season will be aired in April 2027.

The three seasons are available on Blu-ray and DVD, as well as on streaming services.

== Series overview ==
Season	Episodes	Originally released		
Season	Episodes	First released	Last released	Network
1	12	January 4, 2018	March 22, 2018	AT-X
2	13	January 7, 2021	April 1, 2021	AT-X
3	12	April 4, 2024	June 20, 2024	AT-X
4	TBA	April 2027	TBA	TBA

== Episodes ==
=== Season 1 (2018) ===
No. overall	No. in season	Title	Directed by	Written by	Storyboarded by	Original release date
1	1	"Mount Fuji and Curry Noodles"; Transliteration: "Fuji-san to Karēmen" (Japanese: ふじさんとカレーめん)	Yoshiaki Kyogoku	Jin Tanaka	Yoshiaki Kyogoku	January 4, 2018
2	2	"Welcome to the Outdoor Activities Club!"; Transliteration: "Yōkoso Nokuru e" (Japanese: ようこそ 野クルへ)	Shingo Kaneko	Jin Tanaka	Yoshiaki Kyogoku / Shingo Kaneko	January 11, 2018
3	3	"Mount Fuji and Relaxed Hot Pot Camp"; Transliteration: "Fuji-san to Mattari Onabe Kyanpu" (Japanese: ふじさんとまったりお鍋キャンプ)	Tarō Iwasaki	Jin Tanaka	Yuta Yamazaki	January 18, 2018
4	4	"The Outdoor Activities Club and the Solo Camping Girl"; Transliteration: "Nokuru to Soro Kyan Gāru" (Japanese: 野クルとソロキャンガール)	Makoto Sokuza	Mutsumi Ito	Masafumi Tamura	January 25, 2018
5	5	"Two Camps, Two Campers' Views"; Transliteration: "Futatsu no Kyanpu, Futari no Keshiki" (Japanese: 二つのキャンプ、二人の景色)	Nobuharu Kamanaka	Mutsumi Ito	Yoshiaki Kyogoku	February 1, 2018
6	6	"Meat and Fall Colors and the Mystery Lake"; Transliteration: "Oniku to Kōyō to Nazo no Mizuumi" (Japanese: お肉と紅葉と謎の湖)	Norihiko Nagahama	Jin Tanaka	Fumiyo Kamanaka	February 8, 2018
7	7	"A Night on the Lake Shore and Campers"; Transliteration: "Kohan no Yoru to Kyanpu no Hitobito" (Japanese: 湖畔の夜とキャンプの人々)	Yuta Yamazaki	Jin Tanaka	Yuta Yamazaki	February 15, 2018
8	8	"Exams, Caribou, Steamed Buns, Yum!"; Transliteration: "Tesuto, Karibū, Manjū Umai" (Japanese: テスト、カリブー、まんじゅううまい)	Kaoru Yabana	Mutsumi Ito	Katsumi Terato	February 22, 2018
9	9	"A Night of Navigator Nadeshiko and Hot Spring Steam"; Transliteration: "Nadeshiko Nabi to Yukemuri no Yoru" (Japanese: なでしこナビと湯けむりの夜)	Norihiko Nagahama	Jin Tanaka	Masayuki Kurosawa	March 1, 2018
10	10	"Clumsy Travelers and Camp Meetings"; Transliteration: "Tabi Heta-san to Kyanpu Kaigi" (Japanese: 旅下手さんとキャンプ会議)	Yuta Yamazaki	Mutsumi Ito	Yuta Yamazaki	March 8, 2018
11	11	"Christmas Camp!"; Transliteration: "Kuri Kyan!" (Japanese: クリキャン！)	Yayoi Takano	Jin Tanaka	Shingo Kaneko	March 15, 2018
12	12	"Mount Fuji and the Laid-Back Camp Girls"; Transliteration: "Fuji-san to Yuru Kyan Gāru" (Japanese: ふじさんとゆるキャンガール)	Yoshiaki Kyogoku	Jin Tanaka	Yoshiaki Kyogoku	March 22, 2018

=== Season 2 (2021) ===
No. overall	No. in season	Title	Directed by	Written by	Storyboarded by	Original release date
13	1	"Curry Noodles Are the Best Travel Companion"; Transliteration: "Tabi no Otomoni Karēmen" (Japanese: 旅のおともにカレーめん)	Yoshiaki Kyogoku	Jin Tanaka	Yoshiaki Kyogoku	January 7, 2021
14	2	"New Year's Solo Camper Girl"; Transliteration: "Ōmisoka no Soro Kyan Gāru" (Japanese: 大晦日のソロキャンガール)	Shingo Kaneko	Jin Tanaka	Shingo Kaneko	January 14, 2021
15	3	"Surprise Camping and Some Deep Thoughts"; Transliteration: "Tanabota Kyanpu to Aratamete Omotta Koto" (Japanese: たなぼたキャンプと改めて思ったこと)	Tarō Iwasaki	Jin Tanaka	Yoshiaki Kyogoku	January 21, 2021
16	4	"What Are You Buying With Your Temp Job Money?"; Transliteration: "Baito no Okane de Nani o Kau?" (Japanese: バイトのお金で何を買う？)	Kaoru Suzuki	Jin Tanaka	Masayuki Kurosawa	January 28, 2021
17	5	"Caribou-kun and Lake Yamanaka"; Transliteration: "Karibū-kun to Yamanakako" (Japanese: カリブーくんと山中湖)	Masato Jinbo	Mutsumi Itō	Mayu Hirotomi	February 4, 2021
18	6	"Cape Ohmama in Winter"; Transliteration: "Ōmama Misaki no Fuyu" (Japanese: 大間々岬の冬)	Norihiko Nagahama	Mutsumi Itō	Mayu Hirotomi	February 11, 2021
19	7	"Nadeshiko's Solo Camp Planning"; Transliteration: "Nadeshiko no Soro Kyan Keikaku" (Japanese: なでしこのソロキャン計画)	Kaoru Suzuki	Jin Tanaka	Masayuki Kurosawa	February 18, 2021
20	8	"Camping Alone"; Transliteration: "Hitori no Kyanpu" (Japanese: ひとりのキャンプ)	Kagetsu Aizawa	Jin Tanaka	Shingo Kaneko	February 25, 2021
21	9	"Winter's End and the Day of Departure"; Transliteration: "Fuyu no Owari to Shuppatsu no Hi" (Japanese: 冬の終わりと出発の日)	Norihiko Nagahama	Jin Tanaka	Yoshiaki Kyogoku	March 4, 2021
22	10	"The Izu Camp Trip Begins!"; Transliteration: "Izu Kyan! Hajimari" (Japanese: 伊豆キャン！ はじまり)	Tarō Iwasaki	Mutsumi Itō	Tarō Iwasaki	March 11, 2021
23	11	"Izu Camping!! On the Way"; Transliteration: "Izu Kyan!! Michiyuki" (Japanese: 伊豆キャン!! みちゆき)	Yayoi Takano	Mutsumi Itō	Masafumi Tamura	March 18, 2021
24	12	"Izu Camping!!! Birthdays!"; Transliteration: "Izu Kyan!!! Bāsudē!" (Japanese: 伊豆キャン!!! バースデー！)	Shingo Kaneko	Jin Tanaka	Shingo Kaneko	March 25, 2021
25	13	"I'm Home" (Note: The previous episode's preview titled this as "We're Home".); Transliteration: "Tadaima" (Japanese: ただいま)	Kagetoshi Asano; Yoshiaki Kyogoku	Jin Tanaka	Kagetoshi Asano; Yoshiaki Kyogoku	April 1, 2021

=== Season 3 (2024) ===
No. overall	No. in season	Title	Directed by	Written by	Storyboarded by	Original release date
26	1	"Where Should We Go Next?"; Transliteration: "Tsugi, Doko Ikou Ka" (Japanese: 次、どこ行こうか)	Shin Tosaka	Masafumi Sugiura	Shin Tosaka; Masashi Kojima	April 4, 2024
27	2	"Mini Camping and Yard Camping"; Transliteration: "Puchikyan to Niwakyan" (Japanese: プチキャンと庭キャン)	Norio Kashima	Brazily Anne Yamada	Shin Tosaka; Masashi Kojima	April 11, 2024
28	3	"We're Off! Land of Suspension Bridges"; Transliteration: "Shuppatsudesu! Tsuribashi no Kuni" (Japanese: 出発！吊り橋の国)	Arisa Shima; Shinta Inokawa; Ryōtarō Honda	Masafumi Sugiura	Masashi Kojima	April 18, 2024
29	4	"Hatanagi Attack! Death Road from Hell"; Transliteration: "Hatanagi Atakku! Jigoku no Desurōdo" (Japanese: 畑薙アタック！！地獄のデスロード)	Naoki Horiuchi	Masafumi Sugiura	Masashi Kojima	April 25, 2024
30	5	"Campfires and Beef Feasts"; Transliteration: "Takibi to Ushi Matsuri" (Japanese: 焚き火と牛まつり)	Norio Kashima	Brazily Anne Yamada	Masashi Kojima	May 2, 2024
31	6	"See You Again Someday"; Transliteration: "Sore Jā Mata, Itsuka" (Japanese: それじゃあまた、いつか)	Takaaki Nagano	Brazily Anne Yamada	Chizuko Kusakabe; Masashi Kojima	May 9, 2024
32	7	"True or Embellished? Retrospective Camping"; Transliteration: "Hora ka Honmaka? Kaisō Kyanpu" (Japanese: ホラかホンマか回想キャンプ)	Norihiko Nagahama	Masafumi Sugiura	Masashi Kojima	May 16, 2024
33	8	"The Food Porn Begins!!"; Transliteration: "Meshitero Hajimaru yo!!" (Japanese: めしテロはじまるよ！！)	Takuma Suzuki	Yumi Suzumori	Masashi Kojima	May 23, 2024
34	9	"Touring and Checking Out the Cherry Blossoms"; Transliteration: "Tsūringu to Sakura Meguri" (Japanese: ツーリングと桜めぐり)	Seo Chuanbeng	Brazily Anne Yamada	Yasushi Murotani	May 30, 2024
35	10	"Chikuwa, Trains, Chiaki's Solo Camping"; Transliteration: "Chikuwa to Densha to Chiaki no Sorokyan" (Japanese: ちくわと電車と千明のソロキャン)	Harume Kosaka	Masafumi Sugiura	Maya Munemura; Chihiro Nitta (ChuChu)	June 6, 2024
36	11	"Scenery from Way Back"; Transliteration: "Omoide no Fūkei" (Japanese: 思い出の風景)	Kentarō Sugimoto	Yumi Suzumori	Chuchu; Kiyoshi Okuyama; Chihiro Nitta	June 13, 2024
37	12	"April 2nd: Cherry Blossom Camp Trip"; Transliteration: "4-tsuki 2-nichi, Hanami Kyanpu" (Japanese: 4月2日、花見キャンプ)	Shin Tosaka	Masafumi Sugiura	Chuchu	June 20, 2024
