= Asaka (musician) =

Japanese singer from Nagoya (born 1999)

Asaka 亜咲花
- Born: October 7, 1999 (age 26); Nagoya, Japan
- Genres: J-pop, anison
- Occupation: Singer
- Years active: 2016–present
- Labels: 5pb. Records; AniTone Music
- Website: asaka1007.jp

Asaka (亜咲花; born October 7, 1999) is a Japanese singer from Nagoya who is signed to 5pb. Records. She made her debut in 2016 with the release of her first single "Open your eyes", which was used as the ending theme to the 2016 anime television series Occultic;Nine. Her music has also been featured in the anime series A Centaur's Life and Laid-Back Camp. She made her first U.S. appearance at Anime Boston 2018. In 2024 she made her debut as a voice actress in Umamusume: Pretty Derby, where she voiced Espoir City.

== Biography ==
Asaka was born in Nagoya on October 7, 1999. At the age of three, her family moved to Michigan, where she would stay for five years. While in America, she had become exposed to anime series Crayon Shin-chan and Doraemon, which led her to become interested in anime. After returning to Japan, she initially wanted to move to Tokyo, but instead she moved back to Nagoya. While in Japan, she watched the anime series Inazuma Eleven and The Melancholy of Haruhi Suzumiya; she was inspired by characters singing and playing the guitar in Haruhi Suzumiya, which led her to study about character songs. Although she considered becoming an interpreter because of her knowledge of English, after watching the series Macross Frontier and listening to May'n, the singing voice of the character Sheryl Nome, she decided that she wanted to become an anison singer. At the encouragement of her father, and after listening to the singer Konomi Suzuki, Asaka decided to pursue a career in music. Prior to debuting as a singer, she also appeared at various events as a cosplayer.

Asaka began participating in competitions, winning a singing contest in Chubu in 2014. She later participated in an anison contest sponsored by NHK as the representative of the Chubu region in 2015. Following this, she made her debut as a musician in 2016 with the release of her first single "Open your eyes", the title track of which was used as the ending theme to the 2016 anime television series Occultic;Nine. Her second single "Edelweiss" was released in 2017; the title track is used as the ending theme to the anime series A Centaur's Life. Her third single "Play the game", released in November 2017, was used as the opening theme to the Occultic;Nine visual novel. Her fourth single "Shiny Days" was released on January 24, 2018; the title track is used as the opening theme to the anime series Laid-Back Camp, which aired on January 4, 2018. Asaka also performed the ending theme to the Laid-Back Camp spin-off Heya Camp, titled "The Sunshower" which was released as her seventh single. Her fifth single "Eternal Star" was released on August 15, 2018; the title track is used as the ending theme to the anime series Island. She released a mini-album titled 19Box on January 9, 2019. Her sixth single "Kono Yo no Hate de Koi o Utau Shōjo" (この世の果てで恋を唄う少女) was released on April 24, 2019; the title track is used as the opening theme to the anime series YU-NO: A Girl Who Chants Love at the Bound of this World.

In April 2020, it was announced that she would take a one-month hiatus from music activities to recover from vocal cord surgery. She released her eighth single "I believe what you said" on October 14, 2020; the title track is used as the opening theme to the anime series Higurashi: When They Cry – GOU. Her ninth single "Seize the Day" was released on January 27, 2021; the title track is used as the opening theme of the second season of Laid-Back Camp. She released her second album Pontoon on August 11, 2021. Her song "Believe Myself" was used as the opening theme of the 2021 anime series Shikizakura. The song was released as her tenth single on November 10, 2021. Her eleventh single "Ready Set Go!!" was released on January 26, 2022. The title's track was used as the opening theme to the anime series She Professed Herself Pupil of the Wise Man. Her twelfth single "Sun Is Coming Up" was released on June 29, 2022. The title's track was used as the opening theme to the anime movie Laid-Back Camp. Her thirteenth single "Natsuyume Noisy" (夏夢ノイジー) was released on August 10, 2022. The title's track was used as the second opening theme to the anime series Summer Time Rendering. Her 14th single "Wayawayawaa—!" was used as the ED song for the anime Hokkaido Gals Are Super Adorable! and her 15th single, "So Precious" was used for the 3rd season ED song for Laid-Back Camp, both in 2024.

== Discography ==
=== Singles ===
	Title	Oricon peak position	Album
1st	"Open Your Eyes": Release date: October 26, 2016	89	Heart Touch
2nd	"Edelweiss": Release date: July 26, 2017	74	Heart Touch
3rd	"Play the Game": Release date: November 8, 2017	47	Heart Touch
4th	"Shiny Days": Release date: January 24, 2018	32	Heart Touch
5th	"Eternal Star": Release date: August 15, 2018	46	Heart Touch
6th	"Kono Yo no Hate de Koi o Utau Shōjo" (この世の果てで恋を唄う少女): Release date: April 24, 2019	48	Heart Touch
7th	"The Sunshower": Release date: January 29, 2020	32	Pontoon
8th	"I Believe What You Said": Release date: October 14, 2020	23	Pontoon
9th	"Seize the Day": Release date: January 21, 2021	19	Pontoon
10th	"Believe Myself": Release date: November 10, 2021	41	Who's Me?
11th	"Ready Set Go!!": Release date: January 26, 2022	44	Who's Me?
12th	"Sun Is Coming Up": Release date: June 29, 2022	25	Who's Me?
13th	"Natsuyume Noisy" (夏夢ノイジー): Release date: August 10, 2022	54	Who's Me?
14th	"Wayawayawaa—!" (わやわやわー！): Release date: February 7, 2024	42	Song of Life
15th	"So Precious": Release date: April 24, 2024	34	Song of Life
16th	"Give & Take": Release date: February 26, 2025	44	Song of Life

==== Digital singles ====
Year	Song	Album
2021	"See the Light": Release date: November 11, 2021	Who's Me?
2022	"Easy Life, Easy Curry": Release date: March 11, 2022	Who's Me?
2023	"Touka": Release date: January 25, 2023	Who's Me?
2023	"Tsuisou": Release date: June 21, 2023	Who's Me?
2023	"All Is Mind!": Release date: October 12, 2023	Non-album singles
2025	"Hakanairensa": Release date: October 8, 2025	Non-album singles
2025	"Christmas☆Parade": Release date: November 5, 2025	Non-album singles
2025	"Satellite City": Release date: December 17, 2025	Non-album singles
2026	"Kamome Ga Tonda Hi": Release date: January 1, 2026	Sing that Song!!!
2026	"Savage": Release date: April 1, 2026	Song of Life

=== Albums ===
	Title	Oricon peak position
1st	Heart Touch: Release date: October 7, 2019	40
2nd	Pontoon: Release date: August 11, 2021	45
3rd	Who's Me?: Release date: June 28, 2023	70

==== Mini-albums ====
	Title	Oricon peak position
1st	19Box: Release date: January 9, 2019	49

==== Cover albums ====
	Title	Oricon peak position
1st	Sing That Song!!: Release date: January 28, 2026	44

==== Best albums ====
	Title	Oricon peak position
1st	Song of Life: Release date: September 16, 2026	TBA

=== Other appearances ===
Title	Album	Oricon peak position
Never ending true stories: Release date: September 27, 2018	Yuusha Neptunia Sekaiyo Uchuuyo Katsumokuseyo Ultimate Rpgsengen (Theme of "Yuusha Neptunia Sekaiyo Uchuuyo Katsumokuseyo Ultimate Rpgsengen")	148
Konobasyode: Release date: March 31, 2021	TV Animation "Laid-back Camp Season 2" Original Soundtrack	21
Hikarito kageno laplace: Release date: September 22, 2021	SINce Memories hoshinosoraoshitade shudaikashu	111
See The Light: Release date: November 11, 2021	Switch/PS4 "Yurucamp Have a nice day!" OP&ED	—
Mob's God's: Release date: July 28, 2022	ANONYMOUS;CODE Theme Song Book	—
i to ai [Asaka ver.]: Release date: April 23, 2025	Non-album single	—

== Filmography ==
=== Anime ===
- Harmony of Mille-Feuille (2025), Zoe Delaunay
- Romelia War Chronicle (2026), Ryoki

=== Video games ===
- Umamusume: Pretty Derby (2024), Espoir City
