= Eri Sasaki =

Eri Sasaki 佐々木 恵梨
- Born: June 13, 1989 (age 37); Fukuoka Prefecture, Japan
- Years active: 2015–present
- Labels: 5pb. Records (2015-2024); AniTone (2024-present); Sony Music Publishing (2015-2022)
- Website: www.erisasaki.net

Eri Sasaki (佐々木 恵梨, Sasaki Eri; born June 13, 1989) is a Japanese musician from Fukuoka Prefecture who is signed to 5pb. Records and Sony Music Publishing. She made her music debut in 2015 with the release of her first single "Ring of Fortune", which is used as the opening theme to the anime television series Plastic Memories. She released her first album in 2017.

== Biography ==
Sasaki was born in Fukuoka Prefecture on June 13, 1989. She began having an interest in music when, during her kindergarten years, her mother noticed that a classmate played the piano. Her mother then asked her if she wanted to learn how to play an instrument, and she replied that she wanted to play the violin. She played both the violin and the piano into her high school years, when she also learnt to play the guitar. While in high school, she became interested in joining a band. As her school only allowed bands during school festivals, she organized a band on such occasions.

After graduating from high school, Sasaki took up studies at Kyoto University, where she pursued a degree in humanities. During this time, she joined a light music club and performed her first original song, which she sang for her seniors' band called FPS. She later formed her own band, which she named Lattice. While pursuing her graduate thesis, she tried writing songs in the hope that she would soon make her professional début. During her college years, she became increasingly interested in anime, particularly after watching the series Steins;Gate and Robotics;Notes.

After finishing her graduation thesis, Sasaki learned of a competition to write a song for the anime series Plastic Memories, which was written by Naotaka Hayashi, who also worked on Steins;Gate and Robotics;Notes. She participated in the competition, and although her submission was not chosen, she decided to audition instead to be the winning entry's singer. She passed the audition and was chosen to sing the series' opening theme "Ring of Fortune". "Ring of Fortune" was released as her first single on June 8, 2015; the single peaked at number 28 on the Oricon weekly charts and charted for six weeks. Later that year, she made an appearance at Animelo Summer Live.

Sasaki's next release was her second single "Recalling/Last Diary", the title track of which was used as the opening theme to the 2016 visual novel YU-NO: A Girl Who Chants Love at the Bound of this World. She released her first album Period on August 23, 2017. Her third single "Fuyu Biyori" (ふゆびより) is scheduled for release on January 24, 2018; the title track is used as the ending theme to the anime series Laid-Back Camp. On January 26, 2018, recorded guest vocals on track "Choices" from album Amida by Japanese metal band Cyclamen.

On February 2, 2022, Sasaki announced in her official website that she had left Sony Music Publishing and become freelance.
