= Laid-Back Camp season 4 =

Upcoming season of anime television series

Laid-Back Camp
- Season 4
- Main key visual
- Starring: Yumiri Hanamori; Nao Tōyama; Sayuri Hara; Aki Toyosaki; Rie Takahashi; Tomoyo Kurosawa; Maria Sashide; Kokoa Amano; Akio Otsuka

Season chronology
- ← Previous; Season 3

The fourth season of the Japanese animated television series Laid-Back Camp is based on the manga series of the same name by Afro. It is animated by FuRyu Pictures, with Pierre Sugiura supervising the series composition and Shin Tosaka directing.

Production on the season began in November 2024. The staff and cast were announced in March 2026, with additional staff being revealed in November.

The fourth season is set to premiere in April 2027.

== Production ==
=== Development ===
In November 2024, the anime adaptation of the manga series Laid-Back Camp by Afro was renewed for a fourth season. Afro confirmed that the season would highlight the characters Ema Mizunami and Mei Nakatsugawa, who made a few appearances in the third season; they were voiced by Maria Sashide and Kokoa Amano, respectively. In March 2026, Shin Tosaka returned to direct the season at FuRyu Pictures, replacing Eight Bit from the previous season as the animation studio, and Pierre Sugiura confirmed to be handling the series composition. Additionally, Ryūta Ura replaced Hisanori Hashimoto from the previous season as the character designer. By June 2026, voice recording was completed up to the third episode.

Additional staff working on the season were revealed in November 2026, namely Kōichi Motomura for cooking design, Masateru Inada for prop design, Nanako Okazaki as the color key artist, Masatoshi Muto as the art director, Yūta Katayama as the compositing director of photography, Kazuto Furuya as the CG director, Akinori Mishima for offline editing, and Sōta Machiguchi as the animation producer.

=== Casting ===
In March 2026, several voice cast from the previous season were set to reprise their roles, namely Yumiri Hanamori as Nadeshiko Kagamihara, Nao Tōyama as Rin Shima, Sayuri Hara as Chiaki Ōgaki, Aki Toyosaki as Aoi Inuyama, Rie Takahashi as Ena Saitō, Tomoyo Kurosawa as Ayano Toki, Sashide as Ema, Amano as Mei, and Akio Otsuka as the narrator.

=== Music ===
In March 2026, Akiyuki Tateyama confirmed to be returning to compose the fourth season of Laid-Back Camp, after previously doing so on the previous three seasons of the series. That month, Asaka and Eri Sasaki were set to perform the opening and ending theme songs, respectively, as well as the Japanese music unit Kiminone performing the series theme. In November 2026, the opening theme song was titled "Brand New." (ぶらんにゅ。), the ending theme song was titled "Happa no Tegami" (葉っぱの手紙, Leaf Letter), and the series theme was titled "Tonari ni Ireba" (となりにいれば).

== Marketing ==
The teaser trailer and visual for the fourth season of Laid-Back Camp were released in March 2026. The main trailer and visual for the season were released in November 2026. A collaboration with the car buying and selling franchise Carseven was held that month, which will last until December.

== Release ==
The fourth season of Laid-Back Camp is set to broadcast in Japan in April 2027.
