= Laid-Back Camp (2021 soundtrack) =

Laid-Back Camp: Season 2 – Original Soundtrack

Soundtrack album by Akiyuki Tateyama
- Released: March 31, 2021
- Studio: Daikanyama Mages. Studio (Tokyo)
- Length: 102:18
- Language: Japanese
- Label: Mages

Akiyuki Tateyama chronology
It's a Perfect Blue (2021)	Laid-Back Camp: Season 2 – Original Soundtrack (2021)	Freesia (2021)

Laid-Back Camp: Season 2 – Original Soundtrack is the soundtrack album of C-Station's Laid-Back Camp (season 2, 2021). It was published in Japan by Mages on March 31, 2021.

== Background ==
Akiyuki Tateyama served as the composer for the second season of Laid-Back Camp. He revealed that the soundtracks with tilde in the title were created through film scoring. For the soundtracks used in the Izu camping episodes, Tateyama incorporated South American folklore music, particularly from the Andes region, with the help of specialist musicians who played folk instruments such as quena and charango.

For the soundtracks used during the scenes between Rin Shima and her grandfather, Tateyama composed them with the inclusion of bassoon at the end of production when most of the soundtracks had been written. He cited the film Cinema Paradiso (1988) as the influence in composing those soundtracks. For Nadeshiko Kagamihara's theme, he used Royal piano to match her "bright and sparkling" personality. Her two soundtracks ("Nadeshiko" and "Nadeshiko's Thoughts") were built around the four musical notes (do, mi, so, do).

=== Participating musicians ===
Musicians	Instruments	Ref.
Akiyuki Tateyama	Acoustic guitar, Irish bouzouki, banjo, mandolin, and lap steel guitar	
Kazuha Takahashi	Violin and viola	
Nobuhiro Shioya	Flute, alto flute, bass flute, tin whistle, etc.	
Kohei Takeda	Quena and zampoña	
Kenichi Kuwabara	Charango	
Masaki Tanaka	Bassoon	
Ryohei Nomura	Drums	
Panao Matsushita	Percussion	

== Track listing ==
All music is composed by Tateyama, except where indicated. Excluded from the list are the audio dramas written by Mutsumi Itō, with Yumiri Hanamori and Nao Tōyama reprising their respective voice roles as Kagamihara and Shima.

Disc One
No.	Title	Composer(s)	Length
1.	"Yuru Camp△ Season 2 Theme"		2:26
2.	"Seize The Day (TV Size)"	Kento Nagatsuka	1:29
3.	"First Time at Lake Motosu ~The Beginning Starts Here~"		2:34
4.	"First Time at Lake Motosu ~Is it Done? Camping Rice~"		1:29
5.	"First Time at Lake Motosu ~Mount Fuji by Twilight~"		2:33
6.	"What About Our Next Camping Trip?"		2:37
7.	"A Taste of Solo Camping"		2:56
8.	"Everyone's New Year's Eve"		4:44
9.	"It's Time For a Camping Course"		2:06
10.	"Lake Hamana Theme ~Surrounded by Pewter~"		1:18
11.	"Lake Hamana Theme ~Allure of Top-grade Eel~"		2:22
12.	"Lake Hamana Theme ~Ancient Observation Deck~"		1:41
13.	"Lake Hamana Theme ~Lonely But Fun~"		2:20
14.	"Nadeshiko"		2:22
15.	"Thank You For All That You Do, Big Sister"		3:04
16.	"Relaxing Camp"		2:15
17.	"Lake Yamanaka Theme ~A Journey By Bus Is Also Good?~"		2:23
18.	"Lake Yamanaka Theme ~We've Arrived At The Whale-shaped Lake~"		1:43
19.	"Lake Yamanaka Theme ~-2°C Could Be Dangerous~"		2:03
20.	"Lake Yamanaka Theme ~Sitting Around The Wood Stove~"		2:52
21.	"Lake Yamanaka Theme ~Lakeside Sunrise~"		1:50
22.	"Nadeshiko's Thoughts"		2:17
23.	"U・SO・YA・DE"		1:10
24.	"Preview For Next Episode"		0:16
Total length:			52:83

Disc Two
No.	Title	Composer(s)	Length
1.	"At This Place."		4:07
2.	"It's Group Camping After All!"		3:29
3.	"Nodayama Park Theme ~First Time Solo Camping~"		1:50
4.	"Nodayama Park Theme ~Camping Cooking is Fun~"		2:21
5.	"Nodayama Park Theme ~Thoughts on the Night Scenery~"		1:38
6.	"Mysterious Lake"		1:43
7.	"Nadeshiko Has No Signal"		2:13
8.	"Silly Talk"		2:00
9.	"Grandpa Rides a Motorcycle"		0:54
10.	"Together with Grandpa"		1:27
11.	"Let's Ride Together Again, Grandpa"		1:56
12.	"Welcome to Geopark"		2:08
13.	"Joyful Route 136"		2:10
14.	"Historical Peninsula"		2:12
15.	"Sea! Mountain! Cape! Cave!"		1:58
16.	"Blown Away By The Peninsula's Wind Gusts"		2:35
17.	"Enchanted Peninsula"		1:53
18.	"Land Created By The Volcano"		2:13
19.	"Hot Spring Heaven Geopark"		2:12
20.	"Izu Izu Izu Izu"		1:50
21.	"Starry Sky Charango"		2:04
22.	"Let's Go Camping Again!"		2:18
23.	"Next to Spring (TV Size)"	Eri Sasaki; Hero Nakamura	1:36
24.	"Shimarin Dango Ice Cream"		0:22
Total length:			48:48

== Insert song ==
Eri Sasaki, in collaboration with Asaka and Tateyama under the group "Indoor Activity Circle", performed the insert song composed by Tateyama and played in the seventh episode titled "At This Place." (この場所で。, Kono Basho de.). The song's lyrics was written by Asaka. It was originally posted on YouTube in May 2020 under the Camping at Home campaign, which was created to allow people enjoy the feeling of home camping through the series in the midst of COVID-19 pandemic.

== Chart ==
Year	Chart	Peak position
2021	Japan Oricon Albums Chart (Oricon)	21
