= Laid-Back Camp season 3 =

Season of anime television series

Laid-Back Camp
- Season 3
- Main key visual
- Starring: Yumiri Hanamori; Nao Tōyama; Sayuri Hara; Aki Toyosaki; Rie Takahashi; Tomoyo Kurosawa; Shizuka Itō; Marina Inoue; Risae Matsuda; Maria Sashide; Kokoa Amano; Akio Otsuka
- No. of episodes: 12

Release
- Original network: AT-X
- Original release: April 4 – June 20, 2024

Season chronology
- ← Previous; Season 2 Next → Season 4

The third season of the Japanese animated television series Laid-Back Camp, based on the manga series of the same name by Afro, sees the Outdoor Activities Club continuing their adventures and camping in Yamanashi and Shizuoka prefectures following the group camping at Izu Peninsula, with Nadeshiko Kagamihara's childhood friend Ayano Toki now experiencing camping. It was animated by Eight Bit, with Masafumi Sugiura supervising the series composition and Shin Tosaka directing.

Yumiri Hanamori, Nao Tōyama, Sayuri Hara, Aki Toyosaki, Rie Takahashi, Tomoyo Kurosawa, Shizuka Itō, Marina Inoue, Risae Matsuda and Akio Otsuka reprise their roles from the previous seasons. Production on a third season was confirmed in October 2022. A new staff and studio working on the season were announced in July 2023, with additional staff joining in October. Maria Sashide and Kokoa Amano joined the cast in March 2024 to voice the new characters Ema Mizunami and Mei Nakatsugawa, respectively.

The third season premiered on AT-X on April 4, 2024, running for twelve episodes until June 20. The series was renewed for a fourth season in November 2024.

== Episodes ==
| No. overall | No. in season | Title | Directed by | Written by | Storyboarded by | Original release date |
|---|---|---|---|---|---|---|
| 26 | 1 | "Where Should We Go Next?"; Transliteration: "Tsugi, Doko Ikou Ka" (Japanese: 次、どこ行こうか) | Shin Tosaka | Masafumi Sugiura | Shin Tosaka; Masashi Kojima | April 4, 2024 |
Rin Shima camps at Lake Shōji, during which she reminisces about visiting her grandfather in Aichi Prefecture in her fourth grade to see Yahagi Dam and experiencing camping for the first time at Inabu. Meanwhile, Nadeshiko Kagamihara, Aoi Inuyama, and Chiaki Ōgaki build DIY alcohol stoves after school, with supervision from their advisor Minami Toba, as part of doing activities as the Outdoor Activities Club. Ena Saitō, who joined them during the activity, invites the OAC members to camp on her yard where she can trim Chiaki's hair. In a post-credits scene, Ayano Toki sends an unsuspecting Rin a text message while relaxing inside a tent.
| 27 | 2 | "Mini Camping and Yard Camping"; Transliteration: "Puchikyan to Niwakyan" (Japanese: プチキャンと庭キャン) | Norio Kashima | Brazily Anne Yamada | Shin Tosaka; Masashi Kojima | April 11, 2024 |
Ayano buys a pocket stove and visits Cape Irago. During her stay, she checks for cheap tents to purchase. Once she receives the tent, Ayano texts Rin and invites her to go motorcycle camping. Meanwhile, Nadeshiko, Aoi, and Chiaki arrive at Ena's house to camp in her yard. After setting up a tent for Ena's pet dog Chikuwa, Ena begins to cut Chiaki's hair. Once done, Chiaki prepares to make and cook a homemade sausage, but it ends up tasting bad after missing a crucial step. After the yard camp, Nadeshiko receives a text from Ayano inviting her to a camping trip at the Ōi River with Rin.
| 28 | 3 | "We're Off! Land of Suspension Bridges"; Transliteration: "Shuppatsudesu! Tsuribashi no Kuni" (Japanese: 出発！吊り橋の国) | Arisa Shima; Shinta Inokawa; Ryōtarō Honda | Masafumi Sugiura | Masashi Kojima | April 18, 2024 |
Nadeshiko and Rin are invited to camp in a remote area of the Ōi River by Ayano, who has prepared camping equipment. Using the campsite as a meeting place, Nadeshiko travels alone by train, while Rin and Ayano meet up at Senzu Station on the way and decide to go touring on their motorcycles together. While enjoying the journey to the campsite, the two bikers go to their destination, Lake Hatanagi, and at Ayano's suggestion, they visit a series of suspension bridges in the river's basin.
| 29 | 4 | "Hatanagi Attack! Death Road from Hell"; Transliteration: "Hatanagi Atakku! Jigoku no Desurōdo" (Japanese: 畑薙アタック！！地獄のデスロード) | Naoki Horiuchi | Masafumi Sugiura | Masashi Kojima | April 25, 2024 |
Nadeshiko arrives at Abt Ichishiro Station and witnesses the train she rode being linked with an Abt rack system-powered train to climb a steep railway ahead. After arriving first at Camp Ichishiro and securing a campsite, Nadeshiko heads to Okuōikojō Station. Meanwhile, Rin and Ayano continue navigating rough roads past Lake Sesso to reach Lake Hatanagi, dubbing it a "death road". Upon reaching Hatanagi, the two bravely cross the suspension bridge there. They later visit an onsen.
| 30 | 5 | "Campfires and Beef Feasts"; Transliteration: "Takibi to Ushi Matsuri" (Japanese: 焚き火と牛まつり) | Norio Kashima | Brazily Anne Yamada | Masashi Kojima | May 2, 2024 |
While waiting for Rin and Ayano to arrive from Hatanagi, Nadeshiko prepares wood for a campfire and makes amazake-flavored cookies. Later that night, they prepare hamburg steak and beef stew. Nadeshiko combines the beef dishes into a Hatanagi Dam-styled omurice.
| 31 | 6 | "See You Again Someday"; Transliteration: "Sore Jā Mata, Itsuka" (Japanese: それじゃあまた、いつか) | Takaaki Nagano | Brazily Anne Yamada | Chizuko Kusakabe; Masashi Kojima | May 9, 2024 |
After eating canapés for breakfast, Rin and Ayano ride their motorcycles while Nadeshiko takes a bus to head to Sumata Pass to see and cross the Yume no Tsuribashi. (Note: lit. 'Dream Suspension Bridge') They later eat keiryū soba for lunch and go to an onsen. After that, the trio visit the Shiogo suspension bridge as the last bridge for their trip. Ayano does not want to go home yet, so they visit the Hōrai Bridge before going separate ways.
| 32 | 7 | "True or Embellished? Retrospective Camping"; Transliteration: "Hora ka Honmaka? Kaisō Kyanpu" (Japanese: ホラかホンマか回想キャンプ) | Norihiko Nagahama | Masafumi Sugiura | Masashi Kojima | May 16, 2024 |
While chopping firewood on school grounds, Chiaki and Aoi reveal to Nadeshiko that they also have gone camping during the latter's time at the Ōi River. They recount their experiences with Ena to Nadeshiko while embellishing some minor details: meeting at Nirasaki Station, arriving at the Akeno area of Hokuto, passing by Lake Mizugaki to eat yakitori at Godo, taking the alternative yet steep route to enjoy a hot spring at Masutomi, and finally reaching their destination at Mount Mizugaki Natural Park.
| 33 | 8 | "The Food Porn Begins!!"; Transliteration: "Meshitero Hajimaru yo!!" (Japanese: めしテロはじまるよ！！) | Takuma Suzuki | Yumi Suzumori | Masashi Kojima | May 23, 2024 |
Chiaki and Aoi continue recounting their embellished memories at Mizugaki to Nadeshiko: after Ms. Toba arrives at the campsite to bring their cooking materials, the Outdoor Activities Club prepares tomato-flavored yakisoba, okonomiyaki using pizza dough, slow-cooked tomato sauce pizza, smoked cheese, nuts, smoked potato chips, Chiaki's improved homemade sausage, and minestrone.
| 34 | 9 | "Touring and Checking Out the Cherry Blossoms"; Transliteration: "Tsūringu to Sakura Meguri" (Japanese: ツーリングと桜めぐり) | Seo Chuanbeng | Brazily Anne Yamada | Yasushi Murotani | May 30, 2024 |
Rin goes on a solo camping at Oyanagawa Keiryu Park Campsite. She notices a pile of trash while touring the area, prompting her to clean it up. She is helped by two campers, who later invite her into their campervan for a coffee. For her lunch, Rin prepares spinach and tomato pasta. Meanwhile, Nadeshiko and her sister Sakura go on a car trip to view cherry blossoms. They visit the cherry blossom trees found at Naisenji Temple, Utsubuna Park, Mt. Minobu Kuonji Temple, and Daiboshi Park, and the Wanitsuka no Sakura tree. After her camping, Rin visits the onsen at Tōge no Yu.
| 35 | 10 | "Chikuwa, Trains, Chiaki's Solo Camping"; Transliteration: "Chikuwa to Densha to Chiaki no Sorokyan" (Japanese: ちくわと電車と千明のソロキャン) | Harume Kosaka | Masafumi Sugiura | Maya Munemura; Chihiro Nitta (ChuChu) | June 6, 2024 |
Rin traverses the routes that surround the Kōfu Basin. Nadeshiko and Sakura eat lunch at Akasakadai Park in Kai. The three later encounter each other at Jinroku Cherry Blossoms Park. Meanwhile, Ena takes Chikuwa for a walk at Fujikawa Park, where she meets Ema drawing a sketch of them. Chiaki goes on a solo camping for the first time at Ide in Nanbu. She then prepares Sataroga Cooler, a non-alcoholic cocktail, and makes a paracord bracelet. Chiaki visits a nearby onsen, where she surprisingly encounters Aoi.
| 36 | 11 | "Scenery from Way Back"; Transliteration: "Omoide no Fūkei" (Japanese: 思い出の風景) | Kentarō Sugimoto | Yumi Suzumori | Chuchu; Kiyoshi Okuyama; Chihiro Nitta | June 13, 2024 |
Aoi explains that she has received a road bike from her aunt, which she tests by traveling towards Chiaki's location. The tire then gets flat, resulting in Aoi joining Chiaki in her camping while waiting for her father to pick her up. Meanwhile, Rin, Nadeshiko, and Sakura visit Jiunji Temple and eat baked custard pudding. Rin brings the Kagamihara sisters to Fuefuki to witness the bonfire event oigatayaki.
| 37 | 12 | "April 2nd: Cherry Blossom Camp Trip"; Transliteration: "4-tsuki 2-nichi, Hanami Kyanpu" (Japanese: 4月2日、花見キャンプ) | Shin Tosaka | Masafumi Sugiura | Chuchu | June 20, 2024 |
At night, Rin checks up on Chiaki regarding the latter's solo camping experience. The following day, Chiaki is joined by Rin, Nadeshiko, Aoi and her sister Akari, Ena, and Ms. Toba for their cherry blossom viewing camping. They prepare jingisukan with lamb, pork, and frog meats. Later that night, the girls share their cherry blossom photos and witness a cherry blossom tree with a full moon at the background. The following morning, Rin and Nadeshiko share their ideas for the next camping trip as the others begin to wake up and join them. In a post-credits scene, Ena, now a second-year student, finds Ema and her friend, both new first-year students, being invited by other clubs. Meanwhile, the Outdoor Activities Club prepares a recruitment poster.

== Cast and characters ==
- Yumiri Hanamori as Nadeshiko Kagamihara
- Nao Tōyama as Rin Shima
- Sayuri Hara as Chiaki Ōgaki
- Aki Toyosaki as Aoi Inuyama
- Rie Takahashi as Ena Saitō
- Tomoyo Kurosawa as Ayano Toki
- Shizuka Itō as Minami Toba
- Marina Inoue as Sakura Kagamihara
- Risae Matsuda as Akari Inuyama
- Maria Sashide as Ema Mizunami
- Kokoa Amano as Mei Nakatsugawa
- Akio Otsuka as the narrator

== Production ==
=== Development ===
In October 2022, the cast of Laid-Back Camp Movie revealed a third season for the Laid-Back Camp anime series during their stage greeting at the Marunouchi Piccadilly theater in Tokyo, with the franchise's official Twitter account confirming it to be already in production. In July 2023, Shin Tosaka, Masafumi Sugiura, and Hisanori Hashimoto were revealed as the director, head of series composition, and character designer, respectively, of the season produced at Eight Bit; replacing the staff who had worked on the previous seasons and the film at C-Station. This was Hashimoto's debut in character designing. As the new director for the series, Tosaka stated that he wanted to do "an honest and careful portrayal of the charm of the [manga]" in the season, and acknowledged the difference of the new character designs from the previous seasons due to incorporating the "taste of the original manga".

Additional staff working on the season were revealed in October 2023, including Miho Hasegawa as the color designer, Taketo Gonpei as the art director, and Katsuto Ogawa as the director of photography. The Japanese background art production company Creative Freaks was also revealed to be producing the background arts for the season. Tomoyo Kurosawa, who voiced Ayano Toki in the season, confirmed in November 2023 that the dubbing was finished. In April 2024, Point Pictures confirmed that they produced the opening animation.

=== Writing ===
According to Laid-Back Camp author Afro, the season would introduce his favorite "Death Road" story from the manga series, which is the fifty-ninth chapter in the eleventh volume ("Hatanagi Attack!! Death Road from Hell" (畑薙アタック！！地獄のデスロード)).

=== Casting ===
In July 2023, Yumiri Hanamori, Nao Tōyama, Sayuri Hara, Aki Toyosaki, and Rie Takahashi were set to reprise their respective roles from the previous seasons of Laid-Back Camp as Nadeshiko Kagamihara, Rin Shima, Chiaki Ōgaki, Aoi Inuyama, and Ena Saitō. In September 2023, Kurosawa and Akio Otsuka were also set to return for their recurring roles as Ayano and the narrator. Additional recurring cast were revealed in March 2024, namely Shizuka Itō as Minami Toba, Marina Inoue as Sakura Kagamihara, and Risae Matsuda as Akari Inuyama. That month, Maria Sashide and Kokoa Amano joined the cast as Ema Mizunami and Mei Nakatsugawa, respectively. The English dub cast for the season was announced in April 2024, namely Celeste Perez as Rin, Morgan Garrett as Nadeshiko, Katelyn Barr as Chiaki, Hannah Alyea as Aoi, Molly Zhang as Ena, Katie Wetch as Ayano, Larry Cassady as Hajime (Rin's grandfather) and the narrator, Leah Clark as Minami, Jalitza Delgado as Hana, and Marianne Bray as Hana's mother.

=== Designs ===
==== Model locations ====
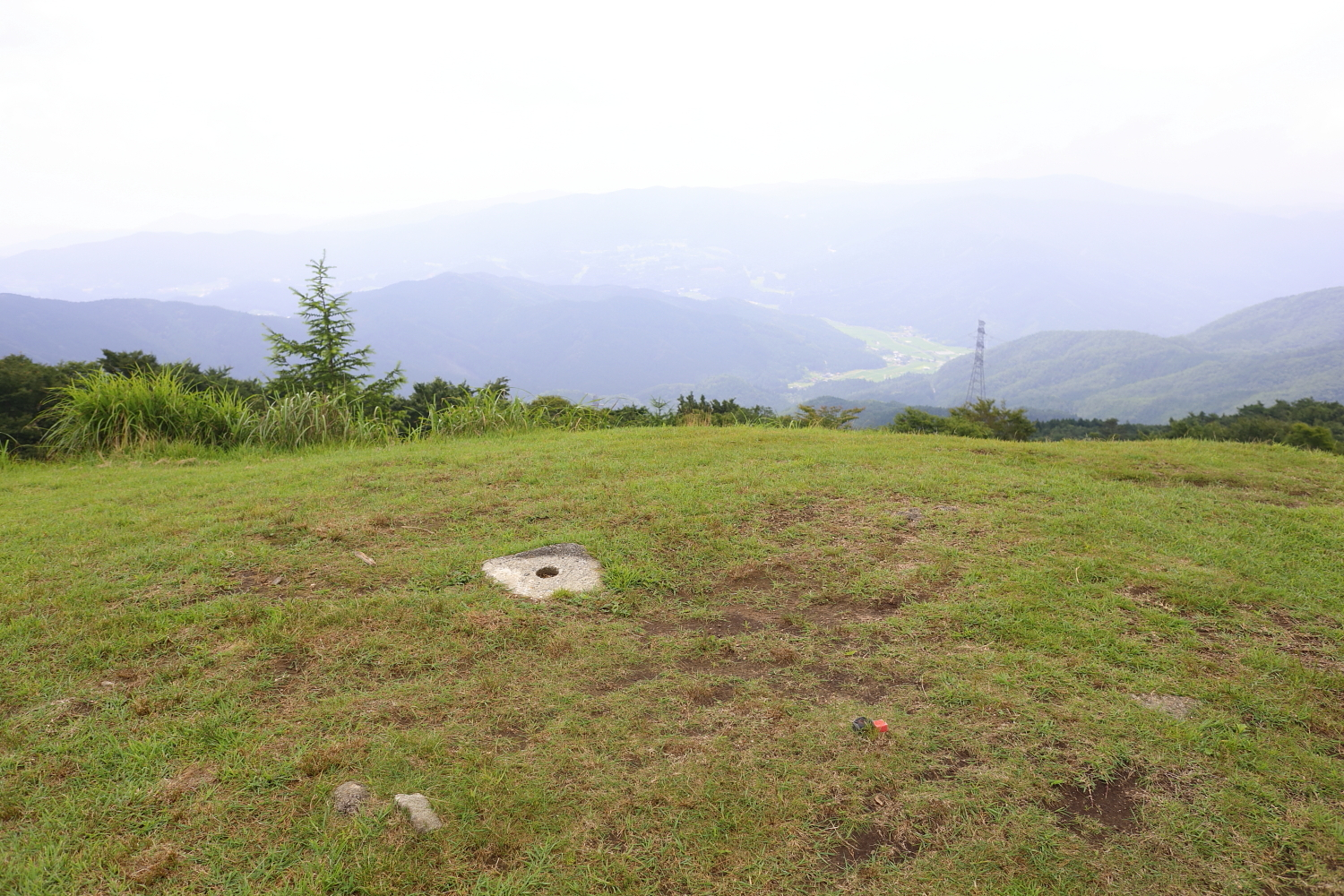
Mount Iyama summit

In the first episode of the season, the Iyama Observation Deck, an observation deck at Mount Iyama in Aichi Prefecture was featured. The outdoor specialty store featured in the second episode, where Ayano visited to shop for equipment that would heat her drink, was based on the real-life Campal Shop Bentenjima store found in Kosai, Shizuoka. In the same episode, the Hamanako Flight Park 2nd Takeoff of Hamanako Paraglider School in Hamamatsu, Shizuoka was also featured.

==== Motorcycles ====
The motorcycles featured in the season, ridden by Rin and Ayano, were based on the Yamaha Vino by Yamaha Motor Company and Ape 100 Special by Honda, respectively.

=== Music ===
Akiyuki Tateyama was revealed to be composing the season in July 2023, after previously working on the first two seasons of Laid-Back Camp. In September 2023, the Japanese music unit Kiminone and Asaka were revealed as the performers of the opening and ending theme songs for the season, respectively. Eri Sasaki was also revealed to be producing the ending theme song. In February 2024, the title of the opening and ending theme songs were revealed as "Laid-Back Journey" (レイドバックジャーニー, Reidobakku Jānī) and "So Precious", respectively. Their singles were released in Japan on April 24, 2024.

== Marketing ==
The teaser visual for the third season of Laid-Back Camp was unveiled in July 2023; its other half was revealed alongside the release of a teaser trailer in September. A character visual for Nadeshiko was released in October 2023, followed by Rin and Ayano in November, Chiaki in December, Aoi in January 2024, and Ena with her pet dog Chikuwa in February. In March 2024, the main visual and a new trailer featuring the theme songs for the season were released.

In January 2024, Weiß Schwarz, a collectible card game by Bushiroad, announced a trial deck and booster pack based on the third season. The trial deck was released on June 28, 2024, and the booster pack on November 8. Additional promotional partners included the outdoor goods brand Aozoragear, which featured a camper that was designed with illustrations of Nadeshiko and Rin; the shokugan (food toy) company Heart, which produced character-themed 3D magnets; and the insecticide manufacturer Fumakilla.

== Release ==
=== Broadcast ===
The first three episodes of the third season of Laid-Back Camp premiered at Shinjuku Piccadilly theater in Shinjuku, Tokyo on February 24, 2024. The season debuted on AT-X on April 4, 2024. It aired twelve episodes, concluding on June 20, 2024.

=== Home media ===
The third season of Laid-Back Camp was simulcast on streaming services d-anime Store and Abema in Japan, on Crunchyroll worldwide (except Asia), and Ani-One in Southeast Asia.

Three volumes of Blu-ray and DVD for the season, each containing four episodes and an original video animation (OVA), were released in Japan: first volume on June 26, 2024, second volume on August 28, and third volume on October 23. The title of the OVAs were The Outclub's Room (野クルのへや, Nokuru no Heya), Rainy Camping (あめキャン△, Amekyan), and Rin and Nadeshiko Go Spring Camping at Lake Inaga (リンとなでしこの伊奈ヶ湖春キャンプ, Rin to Nadeshiko no Inagako Harukyan).

== Reception ==
=== Critical response ===
In his review of the first three episodes, Steve Jones of Anime News Network noted the noticeable change, particularly the compositing, between the third season and the previous seasons after Eight Bit took over the production from C-Station. Jones criticized how the characters "poorly... mesh" with their backgrounds and the use of lightly edited photographs layered into the background. However, he became "more acclimated to the new style" with each new episode released. Despite the new staff and studio, he lauded the season for how it still depicted the spirit of camping and laid-back style, and highlighted areas of Japan that were never heard about such as the Ōi River. He also praised the "heightened presence" of Ayano in the episodes.

=== Accolades ===
In April 2025, the third season was nominated for Best Slice of Life Anime category at the 9th Crunchyroll Anime Awards.

== Original video animations ==
| No. | Title | Directed by | Written by | Original release date |
|---|---|---|---|---|
| 1 | "The Outclub's Room"; Transliteration: "Nokuru no Heya" (Japanese: 野クルのへや) | Sho Kitamura | Brazily Anne Yamada | June 26, 2024 |
| 2 | "Rainy Camping"; Transliteration: "Amekyan" (Japanese: あめキャン△) | Shin Tosaka | Brazily Anne Yamada | August 28, 2024 |
| 3 | "Rin and Nadeshiko Go Spring Camping at Lake Inaga"; Transliteration: "Rin to Nadeshiko no Inagako Haru Kyanpu" (Japanese: リンとなでしこの伊奈ヶ湖春キャンプ) | Shin Tosaka | Brazily Anne Yamada | October 23, 2024 |
