= Laid-Back Camp season 1 =

Season of anime television series

Laid-Back Camp
- Season 1
- Main key visual
- Starring: Yumiri Hanamori; Nao Tōyama; Sayuri Hara; Aki Toyosaki; Rie Takahashi; Marina Inoue; Akio Otsuka
- No. of episodes: 12

Release
- Original network: AT-X
- Original release: January 4 – March 22, 2018

Season chronology
- Next → Season 2

The first season of the Japanese animated television series Laid-Back Camp, based on the manga series of the same name by Afro, follows Rin Shima in her solo camping trip by Lake Motosu in Yamanashi Prefecture and her first meeting with Nadeshiko Kagamihara. It was animated by C-Station, with Jin Tanaka supervising the series composition and Yoshiaki Kyogoku directing.

The season stars Yumiri Hanamori, Nao Tōyama, Sayuri Hara, Aki Toyosaki, Rie Takahashi, and Marina Inoue, with Akio Otsuka serving as the narrator. Initial talks for a television adaptation of the manga series began in July 2015. It was officially confirmed in January 2017, with Kyogoku and Tanaka joining the staff in June.

The first season premiered on AT-X on January 4, 2018, running for twelve episodes until March 22. It received critical acclaim among critics and fans and inspired others to try camping. The series was renewed for a second season, which premiered on January 7, 2021.

== Episodes ==
No. overall	No. in season	Title	Directed by	Written by	Storyboarded by	Original release date
1	1	"Mount Fuji and Curry Noodles"; Transliteration: "Fuji-san to Karēmen" (Japanese: ふじさんとカレーめん)	Yoshiaki Kyogoku	Jin Tanaka	Yoshiaki Kyogoku	January 4, 2018
A girl named Rin Shima comes to a campsite in Lake Motosu, facing opposite Mount Fuji, to spend the day camping. While setting up a campfire, Rin notices a peculiar girl sleeping by the public restroom. Later that night, Rin once again comes across the girl, later introducing as Nadeshiko Kagamihara, who had gotten tired from bicycling toward the area after just moving to a new house, and shares her curry noodles with her before they both get a clear view of Mount Fuji. After eventually managing to get her sister to pick her up, Nadeshiko leaves Rin with her phone number in the hopes of camping with her once again. A few days later, Nadeshiko begins attending her new school, which Rin also attends. Room Camp: Chiaki Ōgaki and Aoi Inuyama discuss about a tent with a heating system, but Chiaki ends up describing a kotatsu.
2	2	"Welcome to the Outdoor Activities Club!"; Transliteration: "Yōkoso Nokuru e" (Japanese: ようこそ 野クルへ)	Shingo Kaneko	Jin Tanaka	Yoshiaki Kyogoku / Shingo Kaneko	January 11, 2018
Nadeshiko pays a visit to her school's Outdoor Activities Club, consisting of its members Chiaki and Aoi. The girls attempt to put together a cheap tent only for it to break on them. They are helped out by Rin's friend Ena Saitō, who draws Nadeshiko's attention towards the fact Rin also attends her school. Later, as Rin goes on another solo camping trip to Asagiri Plateau, Nadeshiko, having been informed about the trip by Ena, goes over with some hotpot ingredients. Room Camp: To celebrate Nadeshiko joining the Outdoor Activities Club, Chiaki treats her and Aoi with kikyō shingen mochi, during which she teaches them on how to eat it.
3	3	"Mount Fuji and Relaxed Hot Pot Camp"; Transliteration: "Fuji-san to Mattari Onabe Kyanpu" (Japanese: ふじさんとまったりお鍋キャンプ)	Tarō Iwasaki	Jin Tanaka	Yuta Yamazaki	January 18, 2018
While Nadeshiko makes gyoza hotpot for Rin, Chiaki gets a job at a liquor store to fund the club. After enjoying the meal, Rin apologizes for being cold towards Nadeshiko when she invited her to join the club and promises to camp again with her sometime. After spending the night in her sister's car, Nadeshiko wakes up early to watch the sunrise over Mount Fuji. Room Camp: Aoi suggests Nadeshiko to try climbing Mount Fuji due to her love with the mountain while Chiaki dubs her "Fujiko".
4	4	"The Outdoor Activities Club and the Solo Camping Girl"; Transliteration: "Nokuru to Soro Kyan Gāru" (Japanese: 野クルとソロキャンガール)	Makoto Sokuza	Mutsumi Ito	Masafumi Tamura	January 25, 2018
While planning for their first camping trip together, the Outdoor Activities Club experiments with cost-effective ways to make their sleeping bags more effective in cold weather before ultimately deciding to buy some sleeping bags online. Meanwhile, Rin gets her motorcycle license and goes on a solo camping trip in Nagano Prefecture. As the club members hike through Fuefuki, stopping at a cafe and hot springs resort along the way, they are sent a live security camera feed of Rin on the highway. Room Camp: The members of Outdoor Activities Club practice different camping practices.
5	5	"Two Camps, Two Campers' Views"; Transliteration: "Futatsu no Kyanpu, Futari no Keshiki" (Japanese: 二つのキャンプ、二人の景色)	Nobuharu Kamanaka	Mutsumi Ito	Yoshiaki Kyogoku	February 1, 2018
The club members take a nice relaxing dip in the hot springs, almost succumbing to the urge to eat before they reach their campsite. Meanwhile, Rin arrives at the Takabotchi Highlands and is overcome by a desire to go to a hot spring too, only to discover the nearest one has closed down. A dejected Rin decides to climb up the peak, where she is rewarded with a lovely view, before finding a spot to cook some pasta. The club members finally arrive at their campsite, where Nadeshiko makes curry for everyone. While the others are asleep, Nadeshiko goes to take a picture of the city lights to send to Rin, who goes to the summit of Mount Takabotchi to send her a similar view in return. Room Camp: Nadeshiko plans to cover the wall of the Outdoor Activities Club room with photos of their camping.
6	6	"Meat and Fall Colors and the Mystery Lake"; Transliteration: "Oniku to Kōyō to Nazo no Mizuumi" (Japanese: お肉と紅葉と謎の湖)	Norihiko Nagahama	Jin Tanaka	Fumiyo Kamanaka	February 8, 2018
Rin opens a package to find a mini-grill, which she dreams of using to cook various meats while talking with Ena. Nadeshiko overhears their conversation and suggests a camping trip to try the grill. The two visit a supermarket to buy meat but are forced to settle for substitutes as their desired items were not available. While there, they meet Aoi, who is working as a cashier, and tell her of their plans. Meanwhile, Chiaki is visiting Lake Shibire when she encounters a man grilling steak in a skillet, who offers her part of it. Rin and Nadeshiko are driven by the latter's sister to the lake. Room Camp: Nadeshiko and Chiaki discuss why there are many soba udon restaurants at a certain mountain when Aoi tells a tall tale about its history.
7	7	"A Night on the Lake Shore and Campers"; Transliteration: "Kohan no Yoru to Kyanpu no Hitobito" (Japanese: 湖畔の夜とキャンプの人々)	Yuta Yamazaki	Jin Tanaka	Yuta Yamazaki	February 15, 2018
At Lake Shibire, Rin and Nadeshiko set up their tents as the latter worries about the myth of a ghost in the lake, while Rin's mother calls the man who had offered Chiaki the steak, revealing him as Rin's grandfather. Rin struggles to ignite the coals in the mini-grill, so Nadeshiko visits a nearby camp for advice. She meets a pair of siblings, one of whom is drunk; the other offers input and new coal for use. After cooking the meat, the two head back to the siblings' campground to give them plates of food as thanks, receiving jambalaya in return. That evening, Rin leaves her tent and encounters a silhouette of a beastly creature, prompting her to run off. As it turns out, the still-inebriated sister had stumbled upon their campsite. Room Camp: Chiaki plans to hold a massive recruitment for their club to have their room be upgraded and asks Nadeshiko and Aoi to draw a mascot to attract attention.
8	8	"Exams, Caribou, Steamed Buns, Yum!"; Transliteration: "Tesuto, Karibū, Manjū Umai" (Japanese: テスト、カリブー、まんじゅううまい)	Kaoru Yabana	Mutsumi Ito	Katsumi Terato	February 22, 2018
Chiaki shows off a wooden bowl and skillet set to Aoi, which she learns must have the lacquer finish removed to place hot food inside and be seasoned, respectively. As they work on this, Ena visits and the three talk about their new substitute teacher and camping after exams. Nadeshiko, Chiaki, and Aoi later visit an outdoor sporting goods store in Minobu, where Nadeshiko declares her intention to get a job to buy a gas lantern. Room Camp: Rin finds Nadeshiko in a panoramic map.
9	9	"A Night of Navigator Nadeshiko and Hot Spring Steam"; Transliteration: "Nadeshiko Nabi to Yukemuri no Yoru" (Japanese: なでしこナビと湯けむりの夜)	Norihiko Nagahama	Jin Tanaka	Masayuki Kurosawa	March 1, 2018
Nadeshiko plans to go camping with Rin, but she catches a cold the night before and has to stay at home. As such, Rin decides to go on her own to a campsite at Kamīna and attempts to take a detour to get there, but she later finds out that the road is closed. After meeting some mountain climbers, she lets Nadeshiko and Chiaki decide where she goes next and visits a temple and a hot spring before eating at a restaurant and oversleeping. Meanwhile, Chiaki visits Nadeshiko at home and cooks hōtō for her family. Room Camp: Ena finds a sleeping Rin and styles her hair into a pagoda.
10	10	"Clumsy Travelers and Camp Meetings"; Transliteration: "Tabi Heta-san to Kyanpu Kaigi" (Japanese: 旅下手さんとキャンプ会議)	Yuta Yamazaki	Mutsumi Ito	Yuta Yamazaki	March 8, 2018
Rin oversleeps and is rushing to her campsite when she encounters a roadblock. Upon being told by Chiaki that it may have been left there and never moved, she proceeds and reaches the site, where she struggles to set up due to the windy conditions. Nadeshiko, Chiaki, and Aoi plan their Christmas camping trip and invite Rin, who initially refuses before being convinced by Ena to accept. Minami Toba, the new teacher, is unintentionally lured into becoming the Outdoor Activities Club advisor and is invited to the Christmas camp. Upon hearing Ms. Toba mention bringing beer along, Nadeshiko realizes she was the drunk sister from the Lake Shibire trip. Room Camp: Chiaki tells Nadeshiko that their and Aoi's surnames are names of the cities found in Gifu Prefecture, but Aoi refutes due to the city that is similar to her surname is found in Aichi Prefecture.
11	11	"Christmas Camp!"; Transliteration: "Kuri Kyan!" (Japanese: クリキャン！)	Yayoi Takano	Jin Tanaka	Shingo Kaneko	March 15, 2018
Chiaki and Aoi check in at the Asagiri Plateau campsite while Ms. Toba sets up her grill and starts drinking. While the two eat at a nearby restaurant, Rin prepares her tent and Nadeshiko shows up shortly after. The four purchase firewood and return to Ms. Toba's table, where she has fallen asleep as Ena and her pet dog Chikuwa arrive. The campers and Chikuwa spend the afternoon playing frisbee with other kids before going their separate ways. At night, Aoi cooks sukiyaki for the group. When their stove runs out of gas, Rin leaves to buy more. She remembers Ena's comments about how fun a group camping trip would be, to which she smiles.
12	12	"Mount Fuji and the Laid-Back Camp Girls"; Transliteration: "Fuji-san to Yuru Kyan Gāru" (Japanese: ふじさんとゆるキャンガール)	Yoshiaki Kyogoku	Jin Tanaka	Yoshiaki Kyogoku	March 22, 2018
Nadeshiko tells the group what she expects them to be like in ten years when Rin returns. After bathing, the campers enjoy various movies and shows on a tablet Chiaki had brought along until they decide to call it a night. Under the stars, Rin and Nadeshiko talk about their plans for the new year before going to sleep. The next morning, the two cook breakfast and watch the sunrise behind Mount Fuji. Rin returns to her job at a bookstore, while Nadeshiko continues pondering about getting one of her own to afford camping equipment. Ena texts her about a job opportunity delivering New Year's cards, which she accepts. In the epilogue, Nadeshiko returns to Lake Motosu to solo camp when she receives a message from Rin, who also happens to be doing the same. Nadeshiko proposes sending photos of their respective campsites to one another; after seeing herself in Rin's picture, she turns around and realizes they will be camping at the same location.

== Cast and characters ==
- Yumiri Hanamori as Nadeshiko Kagamihara
- Nao Tōyama as Rin Shima
- Sayuri Hara as Chiaki Ohgaki
- Aki Toyosaki as Aoi Inuyama
- Rie Takahashi as Ena Saitō
- Marina Inoue as Sakura Kagamihara
- Akio Ōtsuka as the narrator

== Production ==
=== Development ===
Producer Shōichi Hotta initially proposed an anime adaptation of the manga series Laid-Back Camp by Afro shortly after it began serialization in the July 2015 issue of Manga Time Kirara Forward magazine. The adaptation was confirmed in January 2017. In June 2017, the staff animating the season at C-Station were announced, including Yoshiaki Kyogoku as the director, Jin Tanaka as the head of the series composition, and Mutsumi Sasaki as the character animation designer. Kyogoku was introduced by Ryoji Maru, animation producer and the president of the studio, to the producer of the season due to his "good compatibility" with it, earning him his directorial debut.

=== Writing ===
Laid-Back Camp adapted the first four volumes of the manga series. Hotta laid out three themes—focus on fun camping, create a new kind of daily life anime, and feature beautiful places that are still in Japan—beforehand for the season, while also had set two things that needed to forbid—"When a character praises another one of the other girls, don't make them say 'You're cute'" and "Don't let them get touchy-feely so easily"—to portray "raw human relationships" between characters. To depict the camping experience in the season, the staff went on scouting trips to 10 different locations that the characters would be visiting and experienced camping during the winter.

=== Casting ===
In June 2017, Yumiri Hanamori and Nao Tōyama were announced as Nadeshiko Kagamihara and Rin Shima, respectively, as the main cast of Laid-Back Camp. Kyogoku found Hanamori's "fresh" and "ticklish" voice suitable for the character's "innocent" and "energetic" image. Sayuri Hara, Aki Toyosaki, and Rie Takahashi joined the cast in August 2017 as Chiaki Ōgaki, Aoi Inuyama, and Ena Saitō, respectively. Marina Inoue and Akio Otsuka also joined in December 2017 as Sakura Kagamihara and the narrator, respectively. The owner of Suimeiso campsite depicted in the sixth and seventh episodes of the season was modeled after the real-life owner Kitajima Shinsuke. The English dub cast for the season was announced in August 2022, including Morgan Garrett as Nadeshiko, Celeste Perez as Rin, Hannah Alyea as Aoi, Katelyn Barr as Chiaki, Molly Zhang as Ena, and Robin Clayton as Sakura.

=== Design ===
Rin Shima's moped depicted in the season was modeled after the Yamaha Vino scooter, while the camping tools were based on Afro's personal equipment.

=== Music ===
Akiyuki Tateyama served as the composer of Laid-Back Camp. In November 2017, Asaka was announced as the singer of the opening theme song titled "Shiny Days", while Eri Sasaki would be performing the ending theme song titled "Fuyu Biyori" (ふゆびより; "A Sunny Winter Day"), with both singles released on January 24, 2018.

== Marketing ==
The first trailer for Laid-Back Camp was released in November 2017, followed by the second trailer in December. An advanced screening followed by a talk show event with the cast was held at Toho Cinemas in Shinjuku on December 10, 2017. A book containing 200 pages of settings and background arts from the season, titled Yuru Camp Key Animation Book (ゆるキャン△ 設定・背景美術集), was set to be shipped in Japan in early July 2023.

== Release ==
=== Broadcast ===
The first season of Laid-Back Camp debuted on AT-X on January 4, 2018. It aired twelve episodes, concluding on March 22, 2018.

=== Home media ===
Crunchyroll simulcast the first season of Laid-Back Camp worldwide, excluding Asia. Ani-One began streaming the season on their official YouTube channel on December 24, 2020. In November 2022, the season became available to view on Amazon Prime Video in Japan.

The first volume of Blu-ray and DVD for the season was released in Japan on March 28, 2018, which contains an original video animation (OVA) titled Room Camp Episode 0. The second volume was released on May 23, 2018, which contains the second OVA titled Tall Tale Camp. The third and final volume was released on July 28, 2018, which contains the third OVA titled Survival Camp. The three volumes also contain a six-episode camping program starring Yumiri titled Hanamori Yumiri's Beginner Solo Camping (花守ゆみり はじめてのキャンプ入門).

== Reception ==
=== Critical response ===
Stig Høgset of THEM Anime Reviews rated the first season of Laid-Back Camp a complete 5 stars, lauding the series for its "leisurely pace to its fun characters and silly banter, and certainly not least the lovely scenery" and describing it as "Encouragement of Climb season 2.5". Nick Creamer of Anime News Network graded the season "B+", stating that it managed to deliver a "terrific balance of comedy and atmospheric slice of life" and bring the "joy of camping to life" while criticizing some episodes that depicted "less visually compelling" scenes. Rafael Motamayor of /Film praised the season for its beautiful backgrounds and the pacing that would "sell you on the idea of camping", comparing its depiction of Japan's outdoors to how The Lord of the Rings explored the sceneries of New Zealand. IGN listed the season as one of the best anime of the decade.

=== Accolades ===
Year	Award	Category	Nominee(s)	Result	Ref.
2019	Crunchyroll Anime Awards	Best Girl	Nadeshiko Kagamihara	Nominated	
2019	Crunchyroll Anime Awards	Best Voice Actor Performance (Japanese)	Nao Tōyama	Nominated	
2019	Tokyo Anime Awards Festival	Individual Award for Directors	Yoshiaki Kyogoku	Won	

=== Impact ===
In February 2018, YBS Wide News reported that due to the influence of Laid-Back Camp, fans were inspired to try winter camping despite the chilly season, and all of the manga's first five volumes, excluding the fourth volume, were sold out at a bookstore in Kōfu. In the same month, dealers of Yamaha Vino also reported a sold-out sale of the scooters designed with the colors of Rin's scooter. Yamanashi Prefecture had seen a significant increase in the number of tourists visiting the sites that are featured in the season, particularly the Kōan and Suimeiso campgrounds.

Atsushi Tanaka, a tourism professor at the University of Yamanashi, and the Jogaoka Revitalization Promotion Council in Minobu surveyed the economic impact of the season on Yamanashi. The five events for the season, which were held from April 2018 to January 2019, brought in ¥86 million in total earnings from the consumption of local goods and souvenirs, with visitors spending 40% more than the tourism average in the past. The increase on spending was attributed to the "psychological effect" of the season to fans wanting to spend money on the featured locations.

== Original video animations ==
The first OVA for the first season of Laid-Back Camp was released on YouTube for a limited time from December 12, 2019, to January 6, 2020. All of the three OVAs aired on AT-X in May 2020, and aired collectively as "Episode 13" on Tokyo MX and BS11 on March 31, 2022, on TV Aichi and TVQ Kyushu on April 1, on MBS on April 2, and on SBS on April 6.

No.	Title	Directed by	Written by	Original release date
1	"Room Camp Episode 0"; Transliteration: "Heya Kyan Episode 0" (Japanese: へやキャン△episode0)	—	Mutsumi Ito	March 28, 2018
Chiaki and Aoi are examining their cluttered clubroom when the latter presents a camping magazine. The two balk at the equipment's high prices so Chiaki proposes using standard gear from home, though Aoi notes her ideas are impractical or illegal. Aoi finds three metal poles and ties them together to create a tripod grill, which convinces Chiaki to improvise camping gear with other spare items in the clubroom. However, her plan falls apart when they agree it makes them look like hobos, and they settle for buying a cheap tent online.
2	"Tall Tale Camp"; Transliteration: "Hora Kyan" (Japanese: ほらキャン△)	Misuzu Hoshino	Mutsumi Ito	May 23, 2018
While Nadeshiko is reading a magazine, Chiaki and Aoi discuss camping customs in other countries. Aoi briefly leaves before coming back but catches Nadeshiko's suspicion as she is smaller; the real Aoi returns shortly after and reveals the doppelgänger is her younger sister Akari. When Nadeshiko notices Akari's Mount Fuji keychain, the latter and Aoi warn her of an impending war between the Shizuoka and Yamanashi prefectures over who has the better view of the mountain, scaring Nadeshiko. Chiaki chides Nadeshiko for her gullibility when Akari shows up dressed as Rin; although Nadeshiko successfully sees through her ploy, she falls for her older sister Sakura doing the same.
3	"Survival Camp"; Transliteration: "Saba Kyan" (Japanese: サバキャン△)	Yoshiaki Kyogoku	Mutsumi Ito	July 25, 2018
During a plane flight to Australia, turbulence causes Chiaki to panic and jump out with her friends in tow, with the five parachuting onto a deserted island. After establishing a base camp, they struggle to find food and are forced to share a cup of ramen. The next day, the five's luck increases when Chiaki discovers a wealth of bananas and Rin catches a large fish. Although they enjoy themselves, Nadeshiko and Chiaki realize they spent too much time camping on the island over trying to escape, prompting them to run to a cliff and call for help.
