= Long Riders! =

Japanese manga series

- Cover of Long Riders! volume 1 by Ichijinsha

ろんぐらいだぁす! (Rongu Raidāsu!)
- Genre: Comedy, slice of life, sports
- Manga
- Written by: Taishi Miyake
- Published by: Ichijinsha; Bushiroad
- Magazine: Monthly Comic Rex (2012–2018); Monthly Bushiroad (2019–present)
- Original run: 2012 – present
- Volumes: 10
- Anime television series
- Directed by: Tatsuya Yoshihara
- Produced by: Koichi Ishii; Kei Fukura; Atsushi Sugita; Masafumi Kasai; Fuminori Yamazaki; Yōhei Kisara; Masakatsu Omuro
- Written by: Natsuko Takahashi
- Music by: Hiroaki Tsutsumi
- Studio: Actas
- Licensed by: NA: Sentai Filmworks; SEA: Muse Communication
- Original network: AT-X, Tokyo MX, KBS, Sun TV, BS11
- Original run: October 8, 2016 – February 5, 2017
- Episodes: 12

Long Riders! (Japanese: ろんぐらいだぁす!, Hepburn: Rongu Raidāsu!) is a Japanese manga series by Taishi Miyake, which began serialization in Ichijinsha's shōnen manga magazine Comic Rex from 2012 and has been collected in nine tankōbon volumes. Another volume containing material which predated the first Comic Rex chapter was published on May 27, 2014, as Volume 0. An anime television adaptation by Actas aired in Japan between October and December 2016, with the remaining episodes aired on February 5, 2017. A light-novel version by Kei Aramoto began with Volume 1 in August 2020.

== Plot ==
Upon seeing someone ride on a bike, college student Ami Kurata buys a folding bike and takes up cycling with her friend Aoi Niigaki. After meeting experienced cyclists Hinako Saijo, Yayoi Ichinose, and Saki Takamiya, Ami starts going further into the world of road cycling and soon forms her own team, Fortuna.

== Characters ==
Ami Kurata (倉田 亜美, Kurata Ami)
Voiced by: Nao Tōyama
A slightly clumsy college student who takes up cycling. She owns a red Pontac folding bicycle, which she nicknames "Ponta-kun", and later gets a road bike.
Aoi Niigaki (新垣 葵, Niigaki Aoi)
Voiced by: Hiromi Igarashi
Ami's best friend who owns a Gigant bicycle.
Hinako Saijō (西条 雛子, Saijō Hinako)
Voiced by: Rumi Okubo
A cyclist whose family runs a Chinese restaurant, a common prank in the series is when she works in her family's restaurant, she is forced to use cosplay as bunny girl or chinese dress to get a better pay.
Yayoi Ichinose (一之瀬 弥生, Ichinose Yayoi)
Voiced by: Yurika Kurosawa
Hinako's friend who often rides with her.
Saki Takamiya (高宮 紗希, Takamiya Saki)
Voiced by: Yōko Hikasa
Hinako's friend, who often rides to various places instead of taking public transport.
Miya Saeki (佐伯 美弥, Saeki Miya)
Voiced by: Aina Kusuda
Ami's colleague at college who becomes inspired by her to take up cycling herself and later joins Team Fortuna.
Emi Kurata (倉田 恵美, Kurata Emi)
Voiced by: Yui Watanabe
Ami's younger sister.
Alpaca Cycle Manager (アルパカサイクル店長, Arupaka Saikuru Tenchō)
Voiced by: Sayako Tōjō
The manager of a local bicycle shop who always wears an alpaca motif.

== Media ==
=== Manga ===
Long Riders! began as a series of comic strips which Taishi Miyake contributed to doujinshi LongRiders starting with issue 2.0 in February 2012. Throughout that year, he also published a number of web comics using the same characters. Publication of the manga version began in Comic Rex magazine from the November 2012 issue (published Sept 27), and included a credit to the LongRiders doujinshi for draft/planning cooperation. Publication in Comic Rex ended in 2018, and resumed in Monthly Bushiroad Magazine in 2019 under the title Long Rider Stories!. Volume 0 of the collected editions contained the early strips from the LongRiders doujinshi, plus all of the web comics.

No.	Release date	ISBN
1	March 27, 2013	978-4-7580-6367-8
2	October 26, 2013	978-4-7580-6414-9
0	May 27, 2014	978-4-7580-6445-3
3	July 26, 2014	978-4-7580-6446-0
4	December 27, 2014	978-4-7580-6482-8
5	May 27, 2015	978-4-7580-6506-1
6	December 26, 2015	978-4-7580-6561-0
7	June 27, 2016	978-4-7580-6596-2
8	November 26, 2016	978-4-7580-6633-4
9	July 27, 2017	978-4-7580-6673-0
10	July 31, 2019	978-4-0489-9447-7

=== Anime ===
An anime television series adaptation was produced by Actas. The first ten episodes aired in Japan between October 8, 2016, and, December 24, 2016, and were simulcast by Daisuki and Anime Network. After production delays on episodes 3 and 5, the TV station declined to adjust its schedule, and so the final two episodes were not aired in sequence. They were first broadcast during a marathon session on February 5, 2017. The opening theme is "♡Km/h" (Heart kilometers per hour) by Ray while the ending theme is "Happy Ice Cream!" (ハッピーアイスクリーム！, Happī Aisukurīmu!) by the principal voice actors (Nao Tōyama, Hiromi Igarashi, Rumi Ookubo, Yurika Kurosawa, and Yōko Hikasa). Sentai Filmworks licensed the anime in North America.

==== Episode list ====
No.	Title (Note: All English episode titles are taken from the official Sentai Blu Ray release.)	Original release date
1	"A Small Miracle"; Transliteration: "Chīsana Kiseki" (Japanese: 小さな奇跡)	October 8, 2016
Upon entering college with her friend Aoi Niigaki, Ami Kurata takes an interest in cycling after seeing someone ride a folding bicycle. After visiting a few cycle shops and spotting several expensive bicycles, Ami eventually manages to find one within her price range, buying it straight away. The next day, Ami goes cycling with Aoi on a bike path alongside the river, enjoying herself until she inevitably overworks herself and succumbs to hunger knock due to skipping breakfast. Luckily, they come across two other cyclists who give Ami a food supplement before taking her to a dairy farm for some gelato. The next day, Ami and Aoi once again come across the two cyclists, who go to the same college as them.
2	"Seaside Cycling"; Transliteration: "Umizoi Saikuringu" (Japanese: 海沿いサイクリング)	October 15, 2016
The two cyclists from before, Hinako Saijo and Yayoi Ichinose, show Ami and Aoi around the bike shop Alpaca Cycle where Hinako buys a light for riding in brevet events. Over the weekend, Hinako and Yayoi invite Ami and Aoi to Miura for a ride along the coastline. Upon coming up against a long hill, Ami struggles to keep up with everyone, but Aoi manages to help her ascend at a more comfortable pace. After briefly stopping by a restaurant, Aoi helps Ami deal with some bottom pain before they finally reach their destination and are treated to some beautiful scenery.
3	"A New World"; Transliteration: "Atarashii Sekai" (Japanese: 新しい世界)	October 29, 2016
The girls set off for Yabitsu Pass, which is more challenging than the hills Ami has previously faced. Halfway through the route, however, Ami gets a painful cramp in her legs as a result of sweating so much, prompting the others to call it a day despite Ami's protests. Despite the disappointment of her failure, Ami remains determined to keep cycling so she can eventually keep up with everyone. Wanting to cheer Ami up, Aoi invites her on a family trip to Shibu Pass, where they meet another cyclist who tells Ami the advantages of using a road bike when riding up hills.
4	"The Secret Part-Time Job"; Transliteration: "Himitsu no Arubaito" (Japanese: 秘密のアルバイト)	November 5, 2016
Taking an interest in owning a road bike, Ami spots one on sale and puts down a deposit for it, only to discover that the pedals and other accessories are sold separately. Worried about the expenses, Ami takes on a second part-time job, learning that Hinako works at her family's Chinese restaurant. As Aoi becomes worried about what kind of job Ami has taken on, the girls decide to tail her to a maid café, where her clumsiness is seen as an asset.
5	"A Different World"; Transliteration: "Kawaru Sekai" (Japanese: 変わる世界)	November 19, 2016
Ami finally picks up her road bike, instantly coming to enjoy the feel of riding it. While riding out together with everyone, Ami and Aoi discover that the cyclist they met at Shibu Pass is Hinako's friend, Saki Takamiya. Wanting to ride her bike more, Ami decides to go for a ride by herself, ending up with a flat tire while trying to outrace another cyclist. After Ami's attempts at fixing it herself results in all of her spare tubes bursting, she is helped out by a group of cyclists wearing the same jerseys as Hinako and Yayoi. Continuing her lonely ride, Ami feels relieved when she comes across Aoi, realising that cycling is more fun with friends.
6	"Fortuna"; Transliteration: "Forutūna" (Japanese: フォルトゥーナ)	November 26, 2016
Wanting to prove that she has gotten better at cycling, Ami requests to once again try riding Yabitsu Pass with the others. Getting past where she retired last time, Ami is finally able to complete the route, receiving praise from the others. Afterwards, Hinako reveals that the cyclists Ami met before were part of her team, Miko Cycling, who all wear custom-made jerseys. This gives Ami the idea of ordering matching jerseys for her and her friends so they can ride a fléche together. Although Hinako points out that Ami and Aoi can't ride a fléche until they turn 20, she and the others agree to get the jerseys. After picking a design from the various drafts Ami drew, the girls try and come up with a team name, ultimately settling on "Team Fortuna".
7	"The Bonds of the Team"; Transliteration: "Chīmu no Kizuna" (Japanese: チームの絆)	December 3, 2016
As Ami gives her bikes a wash, Aoi suggests that she get her road bike checked in for maintenance. Ami's custom jerseys soon arrive, so the girls take a ride together to a curry restaurant to celebrate. On the way back, Saki warns Ami about being careful when riding downhill, recalling when she got into an accident herself. Afterwards, the team decide to enter the Azumi Autumn Ride cycling event, which involves riding over 100km.
8	"The Expanding World"; Transliteration: "Hirogaru Sekai" (Japanese: 広がる世界)	December 10, 2016
Ami's friend from college, Miya Saeki, hears about her interest in cycling. To prepare Ami for the Azumi Autumn Ride, the girls take her on a 100km course to gain experience. Enjoying both the rides and the food at the rest stops, Ami manages to make it past 100km without even realising it. The girls soon arrive at the Azumi Autumn Ride event, checking into an inn and enjoying the communal baths. After a rested evening, the girls get ready to set off as the event begins.
9	"Azumi Autumn Ride! Part One"; Transliteration: "Azumi Ōtamu Raido! Zenpen" (Japanese: あずみオータムライド! 前編)	December 17, 2016
The moment the event begins, Ami ends up separated from the rest of her team after the staff enforces a gap between them. As a result, Ami overexerts herself in order to catch up with the others, who advise her to rest and pace herself more. After charging up on energy food at the first aid station, Ami becomes motivated by the different kinds of food offered at the other aid stations ahead. After reaching the halfway point and beginning their return journey downhill, the team learn they are running close to their time limit because of all of their food stops.
10	"Azumi Autumn Ride! Part Two"; Transliteration: "Azumi Ōtamu Raido! Kōhen" (Japanese: あずみオータムライド! 後編)	December 24, 2016
The girls begin their rush back down the course, using a slipstream technique to allow everyone to move at higher speeds. The team soon get caught up in some heavy winds, making the uphill sections harder for Ami, who begins worrying about slowing down the team. Receiving encouragement from the others, who feel finishing as a team is the most important thing, Ami manages to keep up the pace and reach the goal in the nick of time. After Ami returns home from the event, proud of her accomplishment, her younger sister Emi gets a flat tire, which Ami manages to fix.
11	"The Moment the Town Starts to Move"; Transliteration: "Machi ga Ugokidasu Shunkan" (Japanese: 街が動き出す瞬間)	February 5, 2017
Yayoi proposes that everyone go on a stargazing night ride to help Ami prepare for taking on a fléche, hiding the fact that she'd be riding all night for 100km. Initially enjoying the nighttime view, Ami starts to become scared when her headlight battery runs out during a dark stretch and she comes close to falling after hitting a stray branch. Luckily, Yayoi manages to replenish her battery and help her catch up with the others. After spending the next stretch cycling with Aoi, Ami gets to watch the sun rise over the ocean with everyone before ending the ride at a hot spring inn.
12	"Long Riders!"; Transliteration: "Rongu Raidāsu!" (Japanese: ろんぐらいだぁす！)	February 5, 2017
Ami and the others go on a two-day cycling trip to Shimanami Kaidō. Along with various eating stops, the girls also visit bicycle shrines during their travels. While stopping at an inn, Hinako, Yayoi, and Saki explain their dream of participating in the Paris–Brest–Paris brevet event in France, inspiring Ami to do the same. The next day, the girls find themselves in a rainstorm, but Ami remains determined to complete her journey even in the rain, though quickly learns how slippery grates can be when wet. Managing to learn from her near-slip, Ami pushes through and is treated to the sight of a rainbow. Finally reaching their destination, Ami feels thankful for discovering cycling. Later, Ami comes across Miyu, who had become inspired by her to take up road cycling, and invites her to join Team Fortuna and ride alongside everyone.
