= Sayuri Hara =

Japanese voice actress

- 原 紗友里
- Born: November 5, 1988 (age 38); Tokyo, Japan
- Occupation: Voice actress
- Years active: 2009–present

Sayuri Hara (原 紗友里, Hara Sayuri; born November 5, 1988) is a Japanese voice actress from Tokyo, Japan. She is affiliated with 81 Produce.

== Personal life ==
In December 2023, Sayuri Hara announced her marriage on X (formerly Twitter).

== Filmography ==
=== Anime ===
2009

- Jewelpet as Rinko Kougyoku

2010

- Haiyoru! Nyaruani: Remember My Mr. Lovecraft as Nyarue

2011

- Kimi to Boku as Kyoko Mamiya
- Last Exile: Fam, the Silver Wing as Primula
- Pretty Rhythm: Aurora Dream as Rizumu Amamiya

2012

- Jormungand as Maurice
- Jormungand: Perfect Order as Maurice
- Kimi to Boku 2 as Kyoko Mamiya
- Last Exile: Fam, the Silver Wing as Navi-kun
- Pretty Rhythm: Dear My Future as Rizumu Amamiya
- Sengoku Collection as Beheading God Bokuden Tsukahara
- Sket Dance as Nori-chan
- Tanken Driland as Hiawy

2013

- Aku no Hana as Mayu Miyake
- Arpeggio of Blue Steel ~Ars Nova~ as Makie Osakabe
- Love Live! School Idol Project as Mika
- Pretty Rhythm: Rainbow Live as Femini; Poppin; Rina Uchida
- Sunday Without God as Deceased; Serika; Sphere; Volrath Fahren

2014

- Inari, Konkon, Koi Iroha as Kon
- Age 12 as Kokoa

2015

- The Idolmaster Cinderella Girls as Mio Honda
- Aikatsu! as Tomoyo Shirozawa
- The Idolmaster Cinderella Girls 2nd Season as Mio Honda

2016

- KonoSuba as Luna
- Age 12: A Little Heart-Pounding as Kokoa Hamana
- JoJo's Bizarre Adventure: Diamond Is Unbreakable as Reimi Sugimoto

2017

- The Idolmaster Cinderella Girls Theater (4 seasons from April 2017 to June 2019)

2018

- Laid-Back Camp as Chiaki Ōgaki
- Captain Tsubasa as Sanae Nakazawa

2020

- Room Camp as Chiaki Ōgaki

2021

- Laid-Back Camp: Season 2 as Chiaki Ōgaki

2022

- Laid-Back Camp Movie as Chiaki Ōgaki

2024

- Laid-Back Camp: Season 3 as Chiaki Ōgaki

=== Video games ===
2011

- The Idolmaster Cinderella Girls as Mio Honda

2013

- Puyopuyo!! Quest as Chico

2015

- Cross Ange: Rondo of Angels and Dragons tr. as Naomi

2018

- Dragalia Lost as Philia and Yachiyo
- Kirara Fantasia as Ōgaki Chiaki

2019

- Azur Lane as Z36

2020

- Captain Tsubasa: Rise of New Champions as Sanae Nakazawa

2021

- Tales of Arise as Rinwell

2024

- Zenless Zone Zero as Nekomiya Mana

=== Dubbing ===
- Thomas & Friends as Alice
