= Maria Sashide =

Japanese voice actress

- 指出 毬亜
- Born: September 20, 1998 (age 28); Saitama, Japan
- Other name: Chunrun
- Occupation: Voice actress
- Years active: 2015–present
- Agent: With Line
- Height: 163 cm (5 ft 4 in)

Maria Sashide (指出 毬亜, Sashide Maria; born September 20, 1998) is a Japanese voice actress from Saitama Prefecture. She is affiliated with the agency With Line.

== Biography ==
Sashide was born in Saitama Prefecture on September 20, 1998. Sashide's mother enjoyed anime, which influenced her daughter and naturally led to Sashide's dream to become an actress. She initially wanted to act in the theater, but after she was told her voice had changed she decided to go into voice acting instead.

After graduating from A&G Academy in 2016, and joined her current agency in April of that year. Sashide was cast as Emma Verde in Love Live's "Perfect Dream Project" idol group. Apart from Love Live!, her voice acting roles include Hana Shirosaki in Wataten!: An Angel Flew Down to Me, Mai Inose in Asteroid in Love and Eve Kagayaki in Kiratto Pri☆Chan.

== Personal life ==
As a child, Sashide's favorite anime were Soul Eater, Gurren Lagann and Fullmetal Alchemist. She also likes the idol groups Nogizaka46, Keyakizaka46 and Hello! Project.

Her skills include jazz dance, tap dance and playing piano. She often plays original songs that her older sister wrote.

== Filmography ==
=== Anime ===
Year	Title	Role
2016	Scorching Ping Pong Girls	Female student 2
2019	Wataten!: An Angel Flew Down to Me	Hana Shirosaki
2020	Asteroid in Love	Mai Inose
2020	Love Live! Nijigasaki High School Idol Club	Emma Verde
2020	Kiratto Pri☆Chan	Eve Kagayaki
2022	Aharen-san Is Indecipherable	Futaba
2022	Love Live! Nijigasaki High School Idol Club 2nd Season	Emma Verde
2022	Beast Tamer	Luna
2024	Laid-Back Camp: Season 3	Ema Mizunami
2024	Loner Life in Another World	Nudist Girl
2025	I Left My A-Rank Party to Help My Former Students Reach the Dungeon Depths!	Nene

=== Anime films ===
Year	Title	Role
2017	Zunda Horizon	Ōedo Chanko
2022	Wataten!: An Angel Flew Down to Me: Precious Friends	Hana Shirosaki

=== Video games ===
Year	Title	Role
2016	Gyakuten Othellonia	Fredricka
2016	Gekitotsu! Crash Fight	Marsha
2016	Chain Chronicles	Paula
2017	Ichi Banketsu Online	Orihime
2017	Tenka Hyakken -Zan-	Yamatorige Ichimonji
2017	Tokyo Clanpool	Shirokka
2017	Puyopuyo!! Quest	Yue and Mappera
2019	Love Live! School Idol Festival	Emma Verde
2019	Love Live! School Idol Festival All Stars	Emma Verde
2020	Dead or Alive Xtreme Venus Vacation	Tsukushi
2020	Duel Masters PLAY's	Cocco Lupiko
2020	Kiratto Pri☆Chan	Eve Kagayaki
2022	Takt Op. Destiny in the City of Crimson Melody	Twinkle Twinkle Little Star
2022	Azur Lane	Emanuele Pessagno
2022	Stella of The End	Philia
2024	Umamusume: Pretty Derby	North Flight
2026	Azur Lane	Tsukushi

=== Other ===
- VR Idol Stars Project "Hop Step Sing!" as Niina Nijikawa
- Onsen Musume as Kaoru Yuda
