= Aki Toyosaki =

Japanese voice actress (born 1986)

- 豊崎 愛生
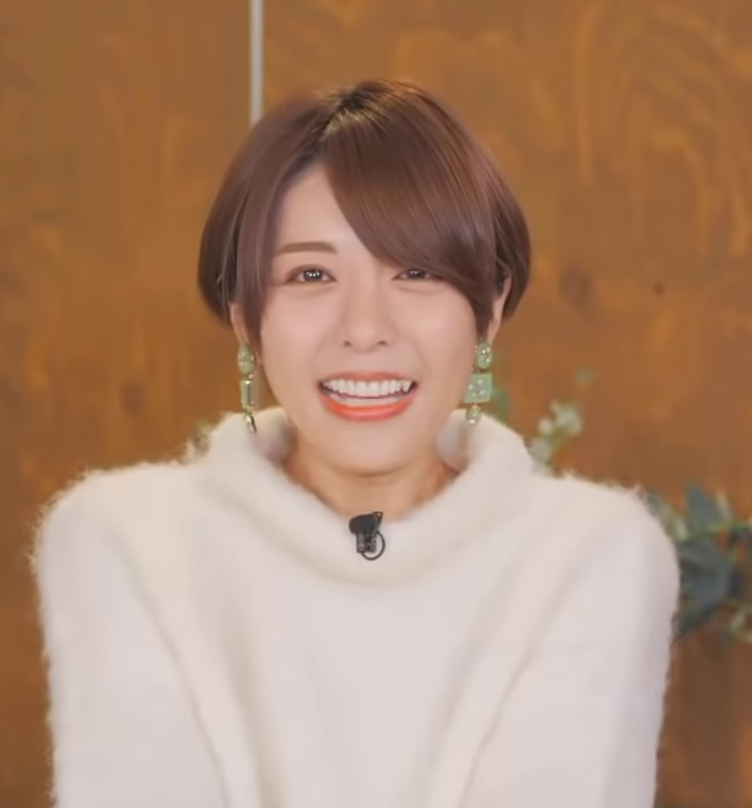
- Toyosaki in 2021
- Born: 28 October 1986 (age 40); Tokushima, Tokushima Prefecture, Japan
- Occupations: Actress; voice actress; singer
- Years active: 2003–present
- Employer: Music Ray'n
- Height: 169 cm (5 ft 7 in)
- Spouse: Undisclosed (m. 2017; died 2025)
- Musical career
- Genres: J-Pop; Anison
- Instruments: Vocals; guitar
- Years active: 2009–present
- Label: Sony Music Entertainment Japan / Music Ray'n
- Member of: Sphere
- Website: www.toyosakiaki.com

Aki Toyosaki (豊崎 愛生, Toyosaki Aki; born 28 October 1986) is a Japanese actress and singer. She had her first major voice acting roles in 2007, voicing Amuro Ninagawa in Kenkō Zenrakei Suieibu Umishō and Su in Shugo Chara!. She was named "Best New Actress" at the 4th Seiyu Awards in 2010 for her role as Yui Hirasawa in K-On! and Kana Nakamachi in Kanamemo, and received the "Best Lead Actress" and "Best Personality" awards at the 5th Seiyu Awards in 2011.

Her career as a musician began with her performance of the opening and ending theme songs of the anime series K-On! in April 2009. That same month, she and three other voice actresses debuted as the musical group Sphere with their single "Future Stream". Later, K-On!'s ending theme was given Animation Kobe's "Best Song" award. She released her first solo single "Love Your Life" in October 2009, and has since released two albums and eleven singles that have placed in the top 20 of Oricon's weekly charts. She was awarded "Best Musical Performance" at the 4th Seiyu Awards for her performance on the K-On! mini-album Hōkago Tea Time with four other actresses.

== Acting career ==
Toyosaki had her first major role as voice actor in 2007, providing the voice of Amuro Ninagawa, the main character of the anime series Kenkō Zenrakei Suieibu Umishō. She was then featured in Minami-ke and Shugo Chara! as Yoshino and Su, respectively.

In 2008, Toyosaki reprised the two roles in Minami-ke: Okawari and Shugo Chara!! Doki—. She is also the voice of Charlotte in the new movie adaptations of Kentaro Miura's dark-fantasy manga Berserk.

She went on to voice Najimi Tenkūji in the 2009 series Akikan! and held the leading role in K-On!, providing the voice of protagonist Yui Hirasawa. She later took the roles of Koyoi Bessho, in First Love Limited, and Kana Nakamachi, the protagonist of Kanamemo. In Minami-ke: Okaeri, she reprised her role as Yoshino a second time.

In 2012, she voiced Chiyuri Kurashima in Accel World, and title character Medaka Kurokami in the two seasons of the high school anime Medaka Box. In 2013, she voiced Kon, the main character's Familiar in Tokyo Ravens.

In 2014, she voiced Seitenshi in Black Bullet, and was the third gender main character Izana Shinatose in Knights of Sidonia, which was also broadcast as a Netflix-exclusive series.

In 2017, she created the stop-motion anime short about the unicorn sponge titled Unicorn no Kyupi.

In addition to voice acting, Toyosaki has also appeared on camera. Her first acting job was on Shikoku Broadcasting's informational variety show Saturday Secret!! (土曜はナイショ!!, Doyō wa Naisho!!) from 2003 to 2004. She, Ayahi Takagaki, Haruka Tomatsu, and Minako Kotobuki appeared twice on the Anime Song Plus (アニソンぷらす, Anison Purasu) television show as the musical group Sphere on 20 April 2009, and 27 July 2009. During its run in July 2009, Toyosaki also narrated the show. At the 2010 Seiyu Awards, she was named as a "Best New Actress" for her role as Yui Hirasawa and Kana Nakamachi. At the 2011 Seiyu Awards, she won Best Lead Actress for her work in K-ON!! and Best Personality for her work on Radion!!, Pl@net Sphere, and Toyosaki Aki no Okaeri Radio.

In Animage's annual Anime Grand Prix awards, Toyosaki placed first overall for Best Voice Actor in 2009. Her character Yui Hirasawa also placed first overall among Best Characters. She also ranked tenth overall in 2012 and eighth overall in 2014.

On 15 August 2025, her agency announced that she would limit her entertainment activities following the death of her husband from a subarachnoid hemorrhage a month prior.

== Musical career ==
Toyosaki's first musical performance was with fellow voice actress Eri Kitamura on the Minami-ke Weather (みなみけ びより, Minami-ke Biyori) image song CD on 23 April 2008. She then performed the opening and ending themes of the 2009 anime series K-On!, "Cagayake! Girls" and "Don't say 'lazy'", respectively, with voice actresses Yōko Hikasa, Satomi Satō, and Minako Kotobuki. Both themes were released as singles on 22 April 2009. The "Cagayake! Girls" single sold about 62,000 copies during its debut week, ranking fourth on Oricon's latest weekly singles chart, while the "Don't say 'lazy' " single sold about 67,000 copies during its debut week, placing second on the chart. The opening and ending singles remained on the chart during the week of 27 April to 3 May, falling to sixth and fifth, while selling an additional 19,963 and 22,094 copies. On 23 June 2009, "Don't say 'lazy'" was awarded Animation Kobe's "Best Song" award.

Toyosaki performed the opening theme of the 2009 First Love Limited series, titled "Future Stream" with Ayahi Takagaki, Haruka Tomatsu, and Minako Kotobuki. Shortly after, the four formed the musical group Sphere. They are affiliated with Music Ray'n, an artist management and publishing group of Sony Music Entertainment Japan. The theme was released as the group's first single on 22 April 2009.

Toyosaki, Hikasa, Satō, and Kotobuki performed the insert song, a song that occurs within the episodes of the anime, "Fuwa Fuwa Time" for K-On!. It was released as a single on 20 May 2009. On 17 June 2009, Toyosaki released a K-On! image song single named after her K-On! character Yui Hirasawa. The single ranked third on Oricon's weekly singles chart during the week of 15 to 21 June, selling 31,384 copies.

Shortly after, Toyosaki, Kaoru Mizuhara, and Rie Kugimiya performed "Heart Connected to You", the opening theme of Kanamemo, which was released 5 August 2009. On 25 June 2009, she provided the narration of a television advertisement for the performance of "Blue Feather", a single by the musical group Binecks. The First Love Limited Character File Vol. 3 image album, released 23 July 2009, includes a song featuring Toyosaki. In July, the anime series Sora no Manimani debuted with the Sphere performed opening theme "Super Noisy Nova", which was released as a single on 29 July 2009. Toyosaki, Hikasa, Satomi Satō, Kotobuki and Ayana Taketatsu performed on K-On!'s Hōkago Tea Time (放課後ティータイム, lit. "After School Tea Time") mini-album released 22 July 2009. The mini-album sold over 67,000 copies to debut at the number one spot on Oricon's latest weekly album chart. It is the first album credited to fictional anime characters to do so. On 27 October 2009, Toyosaki released her first solo single "love your life". Sphere released their third single "It Raises the Wind/Brave my heart" on 25 November 2009. The group released their first album A.T.M.O.S.P.H.E.R.E on 23 December 2009.

After, the group performed the opening theme of Ichiban Ushiro no Daimaō, "REALOVE:REALIFE", which began airing in April 2010. The theme was released as a single 21 April 2010. Sphere next performed on the first day of Animelo Summer Live 2010, at Saitama Super Arena on 28 August 2010. At the 2010 Seiyu Awards, Toyosaki and her collaborators were awarded "Best Musical Performance" for their performance on Hōkago Tea Time. On 28 May 2010, Toyosaki released her second solo single, titled "Looking for Me". In July 2010, the Asobi ni Ikuyo: Bombshells from the Sky anime series began airing with "Now loading...SKY!!" by Sphere as its opening theme. The theme was later released as a single on 28 July 2010. In October, the Otome Yōkai Zakuro anime premiered with Sphere's "MOON SIGNAL" as the opening theme. Toyosaki's voice is also featured in "Junjō Masquerade" (純情マスカレイド, "Pure Heart Masquerade"), one of the series' three ending themes. "MOON SIGNAL" was released as a single on 20 October 2010, and "Junjō Masquerade" was released with the other endings on 24 November 2010. Toyosaki was the fourth top-selling voice actress in 2011.

== Personal life ==
Toyosaki married someone from outside show business in 2017. Her husband died in August 2025 due to a subarachnoid hemorrhage.

== Filmography ==
=== Anime ===
List of voice performances in anime
Year	Title	Role	Notes	Source
2006	Red Garden	Female student		
2007	Gakuen Utopia Manabi Straight!	Handicraft staff 手芸部員		
2007	Love Com	Student, elementary school student		
2007	Bokurano: Ours	Child		
2007	Kenkō Zenrakei Suieibu Umishō	Amuro Ninagawa		
2007	Potemayo	Shizuka Shiina		
2007–09	Shugo Chara! series	Su		
2007	Kimikiss: Pure Rouge	Kazuki Aihara (childhood) 相原一輝（子供時代）		
2007–13	Minami-ke series	Yoshino		
2008–22	夢想夏郷, 東方 (Touhou Musou Kakyou / A Summer Day's Dream)	Suika Ibuki		
2008	Noramimi ja:のらみみ	Girl		
2008	Net Ghost PiPoPa	Siren, Kyoko Urasawa		
2008	Nijū Mensō no Musume	Maid		
2008–09	Nogizaka Haruka no Himitsu series	Mai Asahina, Eri Togasaki	also OVA in 2012	
2008	Akaneiro ni Somaru Saka	Yocchan よっちゃん		
2008–09	*Dolly☆Variety ja:ドーリィ☆バラエティ	Sora Aoki		
2008	Hell Girl: Three Vessels	Yuko Hiraishi 平石逸子		
2008	Bihada Ichizoku ja:美肌一族	Ai Shiratori		
2008	Nodame Cantabile Paris	Student		
2009	Akikan!	Najimi Tenkūji		
2009–10	K-ON!	Yui Hirasawa	2 seasons	
2009	Asura Cryin' series	An Ōhara	2 seasons	
2009	Arad Senki: Slap Up Party	Stella, others		
2009	First Love Limited	Koyoi Bessho		
2009	Umi Monogatari: Anata ga Ite Kureta Koto	Oshima		
2009	Umineko When They Cry	Asmodeus		
2009	Aoi Hana	Miwa Mogi		
2009	Kanamemo	Kana Nakamachi		
2009	Suspended 宙のまにまに	Aiko Wakashi 和下あいこ		
2009	Spice and Wolf II	Merta		
2009	Tokyo Magnitude 8.0 東京マグニチュード8.0	Yuka ユカ		
2009	A Certain Scientific Railgun	Kazari Uiharu	also OVA in 2010	
2009	The Sacred Blacksmith	Lisa		
2009	Kobato.	Hiromi Omura 大村裕美	TV 洋菓子店「チロル」の店員。読みは「おおむら・ゆみ」	
2009	To Love Ru	Momo Belia Deviluke	OVA ep. 4	
2010–11	The Qwaser of Stigmata	Tomo Yamanobe	2 seasons	
2010	Maid Sama!	Manager Satsuki		
2010	Demon King Daimao	Keena Soga		
2010–15	Jewelpet series	Angela, Lady Diana, others	starting with Twinkle	
2010	Shimajirō Hesoka	Nono-chan, Marurin Sasaki		
2010	Okami-san and Seven Companions	Otohime Ryūgū		
2010–11	Mitsudomoe	Yuki Yoshioka	2 seasons	
2010	Cat Planet Cuties	Melwin	also OVA in 2011	
2010	Heaven's Lost Property: Forte	Chaos		
2010	Hyakka Ryōran Samurai Girls	Kanetsugu Naoe	Also Samurai Bride in 2013	
2010	Motto To Love Ru	Momo Belia Deviluke		
2010	Otome Yōkai Zakuro	Bonbori		
2010	A Certain Magical Index II	Kazari Uiharu		
2010–11	Princess Resurrection	Reiri Kamura	OADs	
2011	Beelzebub	Aoi Kunieda		
2011	Wandering Son	Momoko Shirai		
2011	Fractale	Megan		
2011	Hanasaku Iroha	Nako Oshimizu		
2011	Softenni	Yura Hiratsuka		
2011	The World God Only Knows II	Jun Nagase		
2011	Anohana: The Flower We Saw That Day	Tetsudō Hisakawa (child)		
2011–15	YuruYuri series	Chitose Ikeda		
2011	Nekogami Yaoyorozu	Shamo	Also OVA in 2012	
2011	Manyū Hiken-chō	Kaede		
2011	Last Exile: Fam, The Silver Wing	Fem Fan Fan		
2011	Un-Go	Inga, Sumie Yada		
2012	Inu x Boku SS	Chino Kotomura		
2012	Kokon the Animation ja:こいけん！ ～私たちアニメになっちゃった！～	Wakaba Otowa 音羽わかば		
2012	Shimajirō no Wao!	Marurin Sasaki		
2012	Queen's Blade: Rebellion	Mirim		
2012	Medaka Box	Medaka Kurokami	2 seasons	
2012	Natsuiro Kiseki	Rinko Tamaki		
2012	Accel World	Chiyuri Kurashima / Lime Bell		
2012	Hyōka	Rie Zenna		
2012	Kokoro Connect	Iori Nagase		
2012	Busou Shinki	Valona		
2012–17	To Love Ru Darkness	Momo Belia Deviluke	2 seasons	
2013	Valvrave the Liberator	Lieselotte W. Dorssia	2 seasons	
2013	A Certain Scientific Railgun S	Kazari Uiharu		
2013	The "Hentai" Prince and the Stony Cat	Azuki's mother		
2013	Servant × Service	Megumi Chihaya		
2013	Sunday Without God	Ai Astin		
2013	I Couldn't Become a Hero, So I Reluctantly Decided to Get a Job	Aki Toyosaki		
2013	Tokyo Ravens	Kon		
2014–15	Noragami	Kofuku	2 seasons	
2014	D-Frag!	Funabori		
2014	If Her Flag Breaks	Tsumugi Ryukishihara		
2014	Monster Retsuden Oreca Battle	Data Uchiki		
2014	Black Bullet	Seitenshi		
2014	Knights of Sidonia	Izana Shinatose	Also Battle for Planet Nine in 2015	
2014–16	Terra Formars	Yaeko Yanasegawa	2 seasons	
2014	Celestial Method	Yuzuki Mizusaka		
2014	Girl Friend Beta	Raimu Nejikawa		
2015	Fairy Tail	Seilah		
2015	Ultimate Otaku Teacher	Kōtarō Araki		
2015	Mikagura School Suite	Senior		
2015–16	Ushio and Tora	Yuu Hiyama	2 seasons	
2015	Kamisama Minarai: Himitsu no Cocotama	Melory		
2015–16	Concrete Revolutio	Emi Kino	2 seasons	
2016	Kuma Miko: Girl Meets Bear	Clerk		
2016	Kuromukuro	Yukihime		
2016	Berserk	Charlotte		
2016	Time Travel Girl	Mari Hayase		
2016	Ange Vierge	Elel		
2016	Flip Flappers	Welwitschia		
2017	KonoSuba 2	Yunyun		
2017	Scum's Wish	Akane Minagawa		
2017–present	Duel Masters	Momo Uraraka, Queen of the Nature Civilization, additional voices		
2017	Alice & Zouroku	Sanae Kashimura		
2017	Re:Creators	Altair		
2017	Made in Abyss	Marulk		
2017	Our love has always been 10 centimeters apart	Miō Aida		
2018	Laid-Back Camp	Aoi Inuyama		
2018	Kira Kira Happy Hirake! Cocotama	Marme		
2018	A Certain Magical Index III	Kazari Uiharu		
2019	Wataten!: An Angel Flew Down to Me	Emily Himesaka		
2019	Demon Slayer: Kimetsu no Yaiba	Teoni (childhood)		
2019	Isekai Quartet	Yunyun		
2019	Demon Lord, Retry!	Angel White		
2019	Wasteful Days of High School Girls	Shiori "Robo" Saginomiya		
2019	A Certain Scientific Accelerator	Kazari Uiharu		
2019	Fruits Basket	Isuzu Soma		
2019	Cautious Hero: The Hero Is Overpowered but Overly Cautious	Ristarte		
2019	Dr. Stone	Homura		
2020	Heya Camp	Aoi Inuyama		
2020	A Certain Scientific Railgun T	Kazari Uiharu		
2020	Isekai Quartet 2	Yunyun, Ristarte		
2020	Mewkledreamy	Mew		
2020	The Misfit of Demon King Academy	Isabella		
2021	Laid-Back Camp: Season 2	Aoi Inuyama		
2021	Idoly Pride	Kokoro Akazaki		
2021	Rumble Garanndoll	Mimi Kagurazaka		
2022	Uncle from Another World	Alicia Edelsia		
2022	Parallel World Pharmacy	Pharma de Médicis		
2023	The Dangers in My Heart	Honoka Hara		
2023	The Aristocrat's Otherworldly Adventure: Serving Gods Who Go Too Far	Sarah		
2023	KonoSuba: An Explosion on This Wonderful World!	Yunyun		
2023	Skip and Loafer	Sakura Hanazono		
2023	Gamera Rebirth	Junichi		
2024	Sengoku Youko	Nau		
2024	Laid-Back Camp: Season 3	Aoi Inuyama		
2025	Aquarion: Myth of Emotions	Toshi Hatano		
2025	City the Animation	Niikura		
2025	Reincarnated as a Neglected Noble: Raising My Baby Brother with Memories from My Past Life	Princess Hyakka		
2025	Dekin no Mogura	Maggie		
2025	Isekai Quartet 3	Yunyun, Ristarte		
2026	The Warrior Princess and the Barbaric King	Alyssa Marsius		

=== Film ===
List of voice performances in film
Year	Title	Role	Notes	Source
2010	Book Girl	Chia Takeda		
2011	Pokémon the Movie: Black—Victini and Reshiram and White—Victini and Zekrom:	Choroneko		
2011	Un-Go Episode 0: Inga Chapter	Inga		
2011	K-On!: The Movie	Yui Hirasawa		
2012	Berserk: The Golden Age I – The Egg of the King	Charlotte		
2012	Berserk: The Golden Age Arc II – The Battle for Doldrey	Charlotte		
2012	Jewelpet the Movie: Sweets Dance Princess	Angela		
2013	Berserk: The Golden Age Arc III – The Advent	Charlotte		
2013	A Certain Magical Index: The Movie – The Miracle of Endymion	Kazari Uiharu		
2013	Hanasaku Iroha: The Movie – Home Sweet Home	Nako Oshimizu		
2013	Anohana: The Flower We Saw That Day	Tetsudō "Poppo" Hisakawa (young)		
2013	The Lost 15 Boys: The Big Adventure on Pirates' Island	Raymond		
2014	Sora no Otoshimono Final: Eternal My Master	Chaos		
2015	Knights of Sidonia Movie	Izana Shinatose		
2016	Zutto Mae Kara Suki Deshita	Mio Aida		
2016	Accel World: Infinite Burst	Chiyuri Kurashima		
2016	Suki ni Naru Sono Shunkan o	Mio Aida		
2017	Blame!	The Authority		
2019	KonoSuba: God's Blessing on this Wonderful World! Legend of Crimson	Yunyun		
2019	Blackfox	Madara		
2021	Knights of Sidonia: Love Woven in the Stars	Izana Shinatose		
2022	Re:cycle of Penguindrum	Momoka Oginome		
2022	Laid-Back Camp Movie	Aoi Inuyama		
2025	Toi-san	Momo Mochizuki		

=== Video games ===
List of voice performances in video games
Year	Title	Role	Notes	Source
2007	Gakuen Utopia Manabi Straight! Happy Festa	Takeuchi 武内	PS2	
2007	Kenkō Zenrakei Suieibu Umishō	Amuro Ninagawa	PS2	
2008–09	Akaneiro ni Somaru Saka games	Yocchan よっちゃん	PS2	
2008	Momo Taisen Papers ja:桃色大戦ぱいろん	Sherry-mine / Aoyama シェリー=マイン/青山あろえ	PC（一般）	
2008–09	Shugo Chara! games	Su	DS	
2009	Kazeiro Surf 風色サーフ	Arisa Beriev アリサ・ベリエフ	PS2	
2009	Arc Rise Fantasia	Sonia Carlisle ソニア・カーライル	Wii	
2009	Record of Agarest War Zero	Apli	PS3, also Dawn of War in 2010	
2009	Luminous Arc 3	Sion シオン	DS	
2009	Queen's Blade: Spiral Chaos	Ranchel / Suschel ランシェル/スーシェル	PSP	
2010	Keroro RPG: Kishi to Musha to Densetsu no Kaizoku	Ilinx イリンクス	DS	
2010	Marriage Royale Prism Story	Iyo Uwajima	PSP	
2010	Class of Heroes 2G	Olive オリーブ	PS3	
2010	K-On! Hōkago Live!!	Yui Hirasawa	PSP	
2010	Class of Heroes 3	Kirsch-Torte キルシュトルテ	PSP	
2010	Umineko no Naku Koro ni: Majo to Suiri no Rondo	Asmodeus	PS3	
2011	Gashira! ~ Rampage Teacher in High School ~ ja:ガチトラ! 〜暴れん坊教師 in High School〜	Moe Asami 浅見萌	PSP	
2011	Terror of the Stratus	Yui Asai 麻井由比	PSP	
2011	A Certain Scientific Railgun	Kazari Uiharu	PSP, also title in 2013	
2011	Umineko no Naku Koro ni Chiru: Shinjitsu to Gensō no Nocturne	Asmodeus	PS3	
2012	New Little King's Story	Apricot	PS Vita	
2012	Anohana: The Flower We Saw That Day	Tetsudō "Poppo" Hisakawa (child)	PSP	
2012	Accel World: Awakening of the Silver Wings	Chiyuri Kurashima	PS3, PSP	
2012	Girl Friend Beta	Raimu Nejikawa	Also Summer Vacation in 2015	
2012	Kokoro Connect Yochi Random	Iori Nagase	PSP	
2013	Accel World: The Peak of Acceleration	Chiyuri Kurashima	PS3, PSP	
2013	Killer Is Dead	Mika Takekawa	PS3, Xbox 360	
2013	Phantom Breaker: Extra	Yuzuha Fujibayashi	PS3, Xbox 360	
2014	Granblue Fantasy	Melleau	iOS, Android, Web Browser	
2014	J-Stars Victory VS	Medaka Kurokami	PS3, other	
2014	To Love-Ru Trouble Darkness: Battle Ecstasy	Momo Belia Deviluke		
2015	7th Dragon III Code: VFD	Mio Nagumo	3DS	
2015	To Love-Ru Trouble Darkness: True Princess	Momo Belia Deviluke		
2015	Dengeki Bunko: Fighting Climax Ignition	Kazari Uiharu	PS3, other	
2016	Girl's Frontline	Suomi	iOS, Android	
2016	Zero Time Dilemma	Q	3DS, PS Vita	
2016	Persona 5	Caroline, Justine	PS3, PS4	
2016	Monster Hunter Frontier Z	female voice 37 and 38	PS3, PS4, PC	
2018	Food Fantasy	Udon	iOS, Android	
2019	A Certain Magical Index: Imaginary Fest	Kazari Uiharu	iOS, Android	
2019	Dragalia Lost	Ramona	iOS, Android	
2019	Pokémon Masters	Mei	iOS, Android	
2019	Arknights	Bagpipe	iOS, Android	
2021	Idoly Pride	Kokoro Akazaki	iOS, Android	
2021	Alchemy Stars	Tessa, Dawn	iOS, Android	
2021	Cookie Run: Kingdom	Fig Cookie	iOS, Android	
2023	Genshin Impact	Navia	iOS, Android, PC, PS4, PS5	
2023	Persona 5 Tactica	Lavenza		
2025	Umamusume: Pretty Derby	Yunohana Bloom	iOS, Android, PC	

=== Drama CD ===
List of voice performances in drama CD
Year	Title	Role	Notes	Source
2010	Aquarian Age	Fenrir		
2011	Oreshura	Chiwa Harusaki	2 volumes	
2011	Wanna Be the Strongest in the World	Sakura Hagiwara		

=== Tokusatsu ===
List of voice performances in tokusatsu
Year	Title	Role	Notes	Source
2012	Tokumei Sentai Go-Busters	Tiaraloid	Ep. 37	

=== Other dubbing ===
List of voice performances in overseas and other dubs
Year	Title	Role	Notes	Source
2011	Sucker Punch	Blondie		
2012	The Twilight Saga: Breaking Dawn – Part 2	Renesmee Cullen		
2014	We Are What We Are	Iris Parker		
2016	The Powerpuff Girls	Blossom		
2016	Our Times	Lin Zhen-xin		
2017	Smurfs: The Lost Village	Smurflily		
2022	Jaws 2	Tina Wilcox	BS Tokyo edition	
2022	Last Night in Soho	Sandie		
2022	We Are Lady Parts	Momtaz		
2022	Amsterdam	Libby Voze		
2026	Obsession	Nikki		

== Discography ==
=== Solo singles ===
Title	Release date	Chart positions		Oricon sales		Album
Title	Release date	Oricon Weekly Singles Chart	Billboard Japan Hot 100	First week	Total	Album
"love your life"	28 October 2009	12	–	6,999	9,233	Love your life, love my life
"Boku wo Sagashite" (ぼくを探して, lit. "What I'm Looking For")	26 May 2010	11	86	10,865	13,341	Love your life, love my life
"Dill"	10 November 2010	14	85	11,504	15,209	Love your life, love my life
"Shun Pu" (春風 SHUN PU; lit. "Spring Breeze")	13 April 2011	5	56	12,453	17,388	Love your life, love my life
"Music"	25 January 2012	12	77	9,043	10,143	Love Letters
"Shirotsumekusa" (シロツメクサ; lit. "White Clover")	23 May 2012	20	98	7,669	8,904	Love Letters
"Orion to Supankoru" (オリオンとスパンコール; lit. "Orion and Spangles")	19 December 2012	10	66	9,812	11,581	Love Letters
"flip flop" (フリップ フロップ, Furippu furoppu)	22 May 2013	18	66	8,955	9,730	Love Letters
"Cheeky"	28 August 2013	16	86	7,092	7,692	Love Letters
"Delight" (ディライト, Diraito)	19 March 2014	17	–	5,513	6,389	all time Lovin'
"Kanae Tamae" (叶えたまえ)	9 July 2014	11	70	5,307	5,989	all time Lovin'
"Portrait" (ポートレイト)	12 November 2014	17	–	4,743	5,149	all time Lovin'
"Uh-LaLa"	24 June 2015	14	–	5,166	5,569	all time Lovin'
"Walk on Believer ♪"	31 August 2016	25	–	4,529	4,858	
"Honey and Loops" (ハニーアンドループス)	31 May 2017	14	–	4,514	4,514	

=== Solo albums ===
Title	Release date	Chart positions		Oricon sales	
Title	Release date	Oricon Weekly Albums Chart	Billboard Japan Top Albums Sales	First week	Total
love your life, love my life	1 June 2011	7	7	22,447	28,581
Love letters	25 September 2013	13	12	10,574	12,646
all time Lovin'	23 March 2016	10	10	7,836	8,784
