= Laid-Back Camp season 2 =

Season of anime television series

Laid-Back Camp
- Season 2
- Main key visual
- Starring: Yumiri Hanamori; Nao Tōyama; Sayuri Hara; Aki Toyosaki; Rie Takahashi; Tomoyo Kurosawa; Marina Inoue; Shizuka Itō; Risae Matsuda; Akio Otsuka
- No. of episodes: 13

Release
- Original network: AT-X
- Original release: January 7 – April 1, 2021

Season chronology
- ← Previous; Season 1 Next → Season 3

The second season of the Japanese animated television series Laid-Back Camp, based on the manga series of the same name by Afro, sees the adventures of Nadeshiko Kagamihara and Rin Shima in their next camping trip following their first group camping with members of the Outdoor Activities Club last Christmas. It was animated by C-Station, with Jin Tanaka supervising the series composition and Yoshiaki Kyogoku directing.

The season sees the reprisal of cast members Yumiri Hanamori, Nao Tōyama, Sayuri Hara, Aki Toyosaki, Rie Takahashi, Marina Inoue, Shizuka Itō, Risae Matsuda, and Akio Otsuka, with Tomoyo Kurosawa joining them as the voice of Ayano Toki, a childhood friend of Kagamihara. A project involving a second season was commenced in July 2018, which was later confirmed in October.

The second season premiered on AT-X on January 7, 2021, running for thirteen episodes until April 1. The series was renewed for a third season, which began airing on April 4, 2024.

== Episodes ==
No. overall	No. in season	Title	Directed by	Written by	Storyboarded by	Original release date
13	1	"Curry Noodles Are the Best Travel Companion"; Transliteration: "Tabi no Otomoni Karēmen" (Japanese: 旅のおともにカレーめん)	Yoshiaki Kyogoku	Jin Tanaka	Yoshiaki Kyogoku	January 7, 2021
In her middle school days, Rin Shima receives her first camping equipment from her grandfather. She then experiences her first camping trip at Lake Motosu. Rin struggles to set up a fire and cook her food until her mother calls her about the emergency ration she put in her bag, which turns out to be a cup of curry-flavored instant noodles. Back in the present, Nadeshiko Kagamihara takes a part-time job in a post office with Ena Saitō. Rin begins to plan her solo camping at Iwata in Shizuoka Prefecture on New Year's Eve. On her way, she encounters Nadeshiko near a convenience store and receives a cup of instant noodles from her. Inu-Inu-Inuko-san: Nadeshiko asks Chiaki Ōgaki why she calls Aoi Inuyama "Inuko", but Aoi jokingly tells her that her family owns a dog café and they are born in the Year of the Dog.
14	2	"New Year's Solo Camper Girl"; Transliteration: "Ōmisoka no Soro Kyan Gāru" (Japanese: 大晦日のソロキャンガール)	Shingo Kaneko	Jin Tanaka	Shingo Kaneko	January 14, 2021
After visiting the sea at Omaezaki, Rin drops by a tea house at Kakegawa. Upon the recommendation of the owner, whom she met at Yashajin Toge Pass before, (Note: As depicted in the ninth episode of Laid-Back Camp (2018).) she decides to visit Fukuda Beach on New Year's Day. Rin then visits the Mitsuke Tenjin Shrine in Iwata to see Shippeitaro and camps at Ryuyokaiyo Koen Auto Camping Ground later that night. The following morning, Chiaki, Aoi and her little sister Akari, and Outdoor Activities Club advisor Minami Toba visit the top of Mount Minobu to greet the first sunrise of the new year. Rin sees the sunrise by the torii gate at the beach, while Nadeshiko continues to deliver postcards in her part-time job. Chiaki suggests seeing the "Diamond Fuji" next at Fujikawa for the "second sunrise", but the sun already rises upon their arrival. Meanwhile, Rin's mother cautions her about the frozen roads on the way back to Minobu and informs her that her grandfather will pick her up in two days instead.
15	3	"Surprise Camping and Some Deep Thoughts"; Transliteration: "Tanabota Kyanpu to Aratamete Omotta Koto" (Japanese: たなぼたキャンプと改めて思ったこと)	Tarō Iwasaki	Jin Tanaka	Yoshiaki Kyogoku	January 21, 2021
Upon learning about Rin's prolonged stay in Shizuoka, Nadeshiko invites her to spend time at her grandmother's house in Hamamatsu once she arrives. While waiting for her arrival, Rin camps at a campground in Hamana and visits the sea by the Hamana Bridge. The following day, Nadeshiko meets up with Rin at Sakume Station and treats her to unagi. She then brings Rin to her grandmother's house, where they meet her childhood friend Ayano Toki staying over. Later that night, the three visit an observation deck viewing Lake Hamana, where Rin shares her feelings on finding joy in camping alone. The following day, Rin's grandfather arrives to pick her up. Inu-Inu-Inuko-san: Nadeshiko and Chiaki discuss that there are some people believe that Mount Fuji is located in Toyama Prefecture, but Chiaki jokingly tells that the mountain is used to be in the said prefecture before the tectonic plate movement.
16	4	"What Are You Buying With Your Temp Job Money?"; Transliteration: "Baito no Okane de Nani o Kau?" (Japanese: バイトのお金で何を買う？)	Kaoru Suzuki	Jin Tanaka	Masayuki Kurosawa	January 28, 2021
After setting up the hexagon tarp that Chiaki bought, the Outdoor Activities Club members discuss what they will buy with the money they earned from their winter break jobs. Inside the library, Ena reveals to Rin that she ordered a dog tent for her pet dog Chikuwa. After visiting the outdoor sports store Caribou, Nadeshiko ponders Rin's experience camping solo. She begins to look for a new part-time job to save up money for her next camping trip. Nadeshiko's older sister Sakura treats her to a shrimp tempura and suggests she work at the restaurant. Nadeshiko finally buys the gas lamp at Caribou and secretly purchases an oil-based reusable portable heater as a gift for her sister to use instead of disposable pocket heaters.
17	5	"Caribou-kun and Lake Yamanaka"; Transliteration: "Karibū-kun to Yamanakako" (Japanese: カリブーくんと山中湖)	Masato Jinbo	Mutsumi Itō	Mayu Hirotomi	February 4, 2021
Chiaki and Aoi invite Ena to a camping trip at Lake Yamanaka. Before camping, they visit a Caribou store near Mount Fuji Radar Dome to buy camping equipment, relax at a hot spring, and shop ingredients for kiritanpo and wakasagi. They finally arrive at the lake. Chiaki plans for the group to camp at the center of it via its cape, but they get denied by the campsite's manager since it is dangerous. In a post-credits scene, Rin dreams that during her camping, she begins to understand plants and animals.
18	6	"Cape Ohmama in Winter"; Transliteration: "Ōmama Misaki no Fuyu" (Japanese: 大間々岬の冬)	Norihiko Nagahama	Mutsumi Itō	Mayu Hirotomi	February 11, 2021
The trio relaxes at the lake's cape when they begin to notice the sudden drop of the temperature in the area. As Chiaki heads to a convenience store to purchase heat packs and cardboard boxes, Aoi and Ena struggle to find firewood until they are found by a fellow lady camper they met earlier with a corgi. They are invited by Me. Ida to his tent with a wood stove in it, with Chiaki joining them later upon her return. They decide to hold a hot pot party when Ms. Toba arrives to look for them since she was notified by Rin earlier about the temperature drop in the area. In a post-credits scene, Rin begins to clean her moped when Nadeshiko calls her about her desire to try solo camping.
19	7	"Nadeshiko's Solo Camp Planning"; Transliteration: "Nadeshiko no Soro Kyan Keikaku" (Japanese: なでしこのソロキャン計画)	Kaoru Suzuki	Jin Tanaka	Masayuki Kurosawa	February 18, 2021
Rin gives Nadeshiko advice about what to do during solo camping. The following weekend, Nadeshiko visits Fujinomiya to begin her first solo camping trip, while Rin arrives at Akasawa in Hayakawa and later goes to a hot spring in Minami-Alps after encountering Sakura and following her there. Meanwhile, Nadeshiko visits an okonomiyaki restaurant and orders the local delicacy shigureyaki. Sakura notices Rin following her and invites her to relax with her while discussing her little sister's solo camping.
20	8	"Camping Alone"; Transliteration: "Hitori no Kyanpu" (Japanese: ひとりのキャンプ)	Kagetsu Aizawa	Jin Tanaka	Shingo Kaneko	February 25, 2021
Nadeshiko arrives at the Fujikawa Health Ryokuchi Park campsite in Fujinomiya. Meanwhile, Rin and Sakura become worried about Nadeshiko due to being unable to receive an update from her so they decide to check her. Later that night, Nadeshiko grills foil-wrapped vegetables and shares them with the two kids who are also camping with their father. She then views the city lights and manages to send a picture of it to her friends despite the bad signal reception. After encountering each other and sneakily checking Nadeshiko's status, Rin and Sakura leave the campsite. Inu-Inu-Inuko-san: Aoi dreams of camping with a life-sized Caribō-kun mascot but finds its price in its store too high.
21	9	"Winter's End and the Day of Departure"; Transliteration: "Fuyu no Owari to Shuppatsu no Hi" (Japanese: 冬の終わりと出発の日)	Norihiko Nagahama	Jin Tanaka	Yoshiaki Kyogoku	March 4, 2021
The Outdoor Activities Club members begin preparing for the next group camping trip at Izu in March, during which Nadeshiko and Aoi will celebrate their birthdays. Rin and Ena also decide to join them, with the latter revealing her knowledge about Rin's secret visit to Nadeshiko's solo camping trip. Akari also wants to join them to see capybaras. The night before the trip, Rin's father and grandfather help her with installing scooter parts. The following morning, her grandfather rides with her to send her off before parting ways. In a post-credits scene taking place one month before the camping trip, Nadeshiko's mother tells Ena working in a convenience store what Sakura told her about Rin's secret visit to Nadeshiko's camping trip.
22	10	"The Izu Camp Trip Begins!"; Transliteration: "Izu Kyan! Hajimari" (Japanese: 伊豆キャン！ はじまり)	Tarō Iwasaki	Mutsumi Itō	Tarō Iwasaki	March 11, 2021
The Outdoor Activities Club members, along with Ena and Akari, begin the Izu camping trip, with visiting geoparks as one of the themes of their trip. Ahead of them, Rin visits Cape Ose and Ryugu Sea Cave, while the group passes by Mount Shiroyama. Rin arrives earlier than the group at Shimoda, their meeting place, due to them getting stuck in traffic at Kawazu, but they eventually meet later and proceed with traveling together. After buying ingredients for their camping meals, the group arrives at Cape Tsumeki for Ms. Toba's plan to camp by the sea, but they get denied by the landowner. They contact Mr. Īda for help to find a new campsite, which happens to be owned by his friend on the shores of west Izu. The group later visits Hosono Highlands before going to the campsite.
23	11	"Izu Camping!! On the Way"; Transliteration: "Izu Kyan!! Michiyuki" (Japanese: 伊豆キャン!! みちゆき)	Yayoi Takano	Mutsumi Itō	Masafumi Tamura	March 18, 2021
The group visits a hot spring at Nishiizu following their tour at Mount Misuji. Ms. Toba accidentally slurps a beer after taking a bath, forcing them to take a designated driver service to reach their campsite at Cape Kogane. Nadeshiko and Aoi prepare gambas al ajillo and red sea bream soup pasta as one of their dinner meals. While everyone is asleep, Nadeshiko and Ena share their experience and future plans in camping. Waking up ahead of them, Rin takes time strolling around the cape, visiting Sawada Park, and taking a bath in a hot spring. Inu-Inu-Inuko-san: Aoi and Akari prepare a Mount Fuji-shaped tokoroten, but it ends up in a failure.
24	12	"Izu Camping!!! Birthdays!"; Transliteration: "Izu Kyan!!! Bāsudē!" (Japanese: 伊豆キャン!!! バースデー！)	Shingo Kaneko	Jin Tanaka	Shingo Kaneko	March 25, 2021
After eating kaisendon for their lunch, the group visits Dogashima and the tombolo of Sanshiro Islands. Afterward, they visit Darumayama Highlands and lodge at a campsite located on the plateau near Mount Daruma. Ms. Toba and Akari bring Nadeshiko and Aoi to Cape Mihama, while the rest prepare for dinner. Later night, they celebrate Nadeshiko and Aoi's birthdays. The following morning, the group, except for Ms. Toba and Akari, greet the sunrise on top of Mount Daruma.
25	13	"I'm Home" (Note: The previous episode's preview titled this as "We're Home".); Transliteration: "Tadaima" (Japanese: ただいま)	Kagetoshi Asano; Yoshiaki Kyogoku	Jin Tanaka	Kagetoshi Asano; Yoshiaki Kyogoku	April 1, 2021
The group stops by Mr. Īda's wine shop before going to Mount Ōmuro. Afterward, they visit Izu Cactus Zoo for Akari to see capybaras. As they head home, Rin part ways with the group at Shuzenji. The group riding Ms. Toba's car manages to arrive back at their houses in Yamanashi Prefecture later night, while Rin is still outside riding back home. A worried Nadeshiko decides to meet her by surprise at Lake Motosu, where they discuss the conclusion of their recent Izu camping trip.

== Cast and characters ==
- Yumiri Hanamori as Nadeshiko Kagamihara
- Nao Tōyama as Rin Shima
- Sayuri Hara as Chiaki Ōgaki
- Aki Toyosaki as Aoi Inuyama
- Rie Takahashi as Ena Saitō
- Tomoyo Kurosawa as Ayano Toki
- Marina Inoue as Sakura Kagamihara
- Shizuka Itō as Minami Toba
- Risae Matsuda as Akari Inuyama
- Akio Otsuka as the narrator

== Production ==
=== Development ===
Initial talks for a second season began during the airing of the first season of Laid-Back Camp due to its positive feedback, but the staff stated that another season was not possible "right away" due to their work schedule. Director Yoshiaki Kyogoku felt that it was "impossible" to happen. In July 2018, producer Shōichi Hotta was offered by FuRyu to lead the second season project despite being no longer affiliated with the company. Hotta then approached animation producer Ryoji Maru with a "big new" project, which consisted of the second season, a short anime, and a film, and discussed the season with writer Jin Tanaka and Kyogoku in an izakaya near C-Station's office.

In October 2018, the season was greenlit at the Yuru Camp Secret Society Blanket Enrollment Explanation Meeting, an event for the anime series. The returning staff included Kyogoku, Tanaka, character animation designer Mutsumi Sasaki, and cinematographer Hiroaki Tanaka. The season was produced by DeNA and animated by C-Station.

=== Writing ===
The staff based the second season of Laid-Back Camp starting from the fifth volume of the manga series and included the concept of "family", which was found in those volumes to complete its story, which it covers until the ninth volume. In an interview with Business Insider, Hotta explained that unlike the first one, which focused on the characters meeting each other and becoming friends, the second season would explore their individual "journey[s]" as they began to think about what they wanted to do, particularly Nadeshiko Kagamihara becoming interested in solo camping. This idea was based on a line from the fifth volume: "... you enjoy the solitude." (さみしさも楽しむもの) Hotta created two catchphrases for the season, which are "It's lonely, but also fun" and "It's fun, but also lonely".

Hotta, Kyogoku, and several other C-Station staff went on a camping trip to locations that would be featured in the season as part of their research and managed to complete it before the COVID-19 pandemic worsen. More than 10 scouting trips were conducted to various locations in Yamanashi and Shizuoka prefectures, and other places that the characters would be visiting in the season.

=== Casting ===
Yumiri Hanamori, Nao Tōyama, Sayuri Hara, Aki Toyosaki, Rie Takahashi, Marina Inoue, Shizuka Itō, and Risae Matsuda reprised their respective roles from the first season as Nadeshiko Kagamihara, Rin Shima, Chiaki Ōgaki, Aoi Inuyama, Ena Saitō, Sakura Kagamihara, Minami Toba, and Akari Inuyama, with Akio Otsuka also returning as the narrator and voice of Rin's grandfather. In August 2020, Tomoyo Kurosawa joined the cast as Nadeshiko's childhood friend named Ayano Toki. Tadahisa Fujimura and Masamichi Ureshino, directors of How Do You Like Wednesday?, made cameo appearances as a smelt fisherman and the manager of the campsite at Cape Ohmama. The English dub cast for the season was announced in January 2024, including Celeste Perez as Rin, Morgan Garrett as Nadeshiko, Molly Zhang as Ena, Katelyn Barr as Chiaki, Hannah Alyea as Aoi, Phil Parsons as Wataru, Kelsey Cruz as Saki, Larry Cassady as the narrator, Katie Wetch as Ayano, and Ian Sinclair as the clerk.

=== Music ===
External videos
- 【特別公開】『ゆるキャン△ SEASON２』ノンクレジットOP／亜咲花『Seize The Day』 presents composer Kento Nagatsuka's Laid-Back Camp: Season 2 opening theme music as performed by Asaka with the opening credit sequence, YouTube video from Anime Channel by フリュー's channel

Akiyuki Tateyama returned as the composer of the second season. The opening theme song is "Seize the Day", performed by Asaka, while the ending theme song is "Haru no Tonari" (はるのとなり; "Next to Spring"), performed by Eri Sasaki, which were both released on January 27, 2021. Sasaki revealed that the song was already recorded when she did a recording session with Hero Nakamura, co-creator of the first season's ending theme music, in September 2018. She also performed the insert song "Kono Basho de." (この場所で。; "At This Place.") for the seventh episode.

== Marketing ==
A teaser trailer for the second season of Laid-Back Camp was released on September 21, 2020, followed by the second trailer on November 20. On November 29, 2020, advanced screening for the first episode was held in Marunouchi Piccadilly in Tokyo and streamed live in other 36 movie theaters in Japan. In December 2020, the Shizuoka Prefecture created two maps featuring model locations and campsites in the prefecture that would be introduced in the season. A full trailer for the series was released on December 23, 2020.

== Release ==
=== Broadcast ===
The second season of Laid-Back Camp debuted on AT-X on January 7, 2021. It aired thirteen episodes, concluding on April 1, 2021.

=== Home media ===
Ani-One simulcast the second season of Laid-Back Camp on their official YouTube channel, while Netflix began streaming it on June 30, 2021. In November 2022, the season became available to view on Amazon Prime Video in Japan.

The first volume of Blu-ray and DVD for the season was released in Japan on March 24, 2021. The second volume was released on May 26, 2021, which contains a new original video animation (OVA) titled Mystery Camp. The third and final volume was released on July 28, 2021, which contains the second OVA titled Traveling Rin Shima. Each of the volumes contains an episode of the director's cut version of Akio Camp (あきキャン△) starring Otsuka and the camping program Aki Camp (愛生キャン△) starring Toyosaki.

== Reception ==
=== Critical response ===
Steve Jones of Anime News Network reviewed the first three episodes of the second season of Laid-Back Camp, stating that the series was not just about camping but also a "travelogue about the sights and experiences of Japan outside of the major metropolitan areas", while Jones' colleague Theron Martin found the first episode "nothing... quite as funny as the better moments in the first season" but lauded the scenes, attention-to-detail camping tools, and "low-key" music. Stig Høgset of THEM Anime Reviews rated the season a complete 5 stars, stating that it was an "absolute masterpiece of a relaxed zen winter camping endorsement". Writing for Polygon, Julia Lee lauded the second season for being a "semi-educational show" like the first one and how it provided "fun looks into some cool areas of Japan", and dubbed it the "most comfy anime" in the last decade.

=== Accolades ===
In December 2021, the second season of Laid-Back Camp was among the Top 100 Favorites nominated for the Anime of the Year at the Tokyo Anime Award Festival 2022.

Year	Award	Category	Nominee(s)	Result	Ref.
2021	Shanghai Television Festival	Best Animation	Laid-Back Camp season 2	Nominated	
2022	Setsucon Anime Awards	Sequel of the Year	Laid-Back Camp season 2	Nominated	
2022	Setsucon Anime Awards	Best Ship	Rin × Nadeshiko	Nominated	
2022	Location Japan Award	Special Award – Approval Rating	Laid-Back Camp season 2 × Shizuoka Prefecture	Won	

=== Impact ===
The number of visitors to tourist facilities in Iwata, such as the torii gate at Fukuda Beach, Ryuyokaiyo Koen Auto Camping Ground, and Mitsuke Tenjin Shrine, had seen a significant increase due to the city being featured in the second season of Laid-Back Camp. According to Shizuoka Economic Research Institute in February 2023, an economic ripple effect of ¥411.48 million was generated in Shizuoka after the prefecture collaborated with the series to hold a stamp rally featuring the locations visited by the characters in the second season, which was held from November 12, 2021, to March 21, 2022.

== Original video animations ==
No.	Title	Directed by	Written by	Original release date
1	"Mystery Camp"; Transliteration: "Misuterī Kyanpu" (Japanese: ミステリーキャンプ)	Kagetsu Aizawa	Mutsumi Ito	May 26, 2021
Aoi introduces the following events that she describes as "extraordinary": Nadeshiko and Aoi use a service app that allows delivering their camping equipment when needed, but they forget to have a packaged Chiaki be delivered; Nadeshiko arrives at a dystopian campsite; Nadeshiko talks about s'mores with Rin while they roast a marshmallow that turns out to be a king trumpet mushroom.
2	"Traveling Rin Shima"; Transliteration: "Tabi suru Shima Rin" (Japanese: 旅するしまりん)	Kagetsu Aizawa	Mutsumi Ito	July 28, 2021
While camping, Ena, Nadeshiko, Chiaki, and Aoi fantasize about Rin's solo camping trip such as camping on Mars, traveling to Hokkaido and Shikoku, and visiting different hot springs.
