= Nao Tōyama =

Japanese voice actress

- 東山 奈央
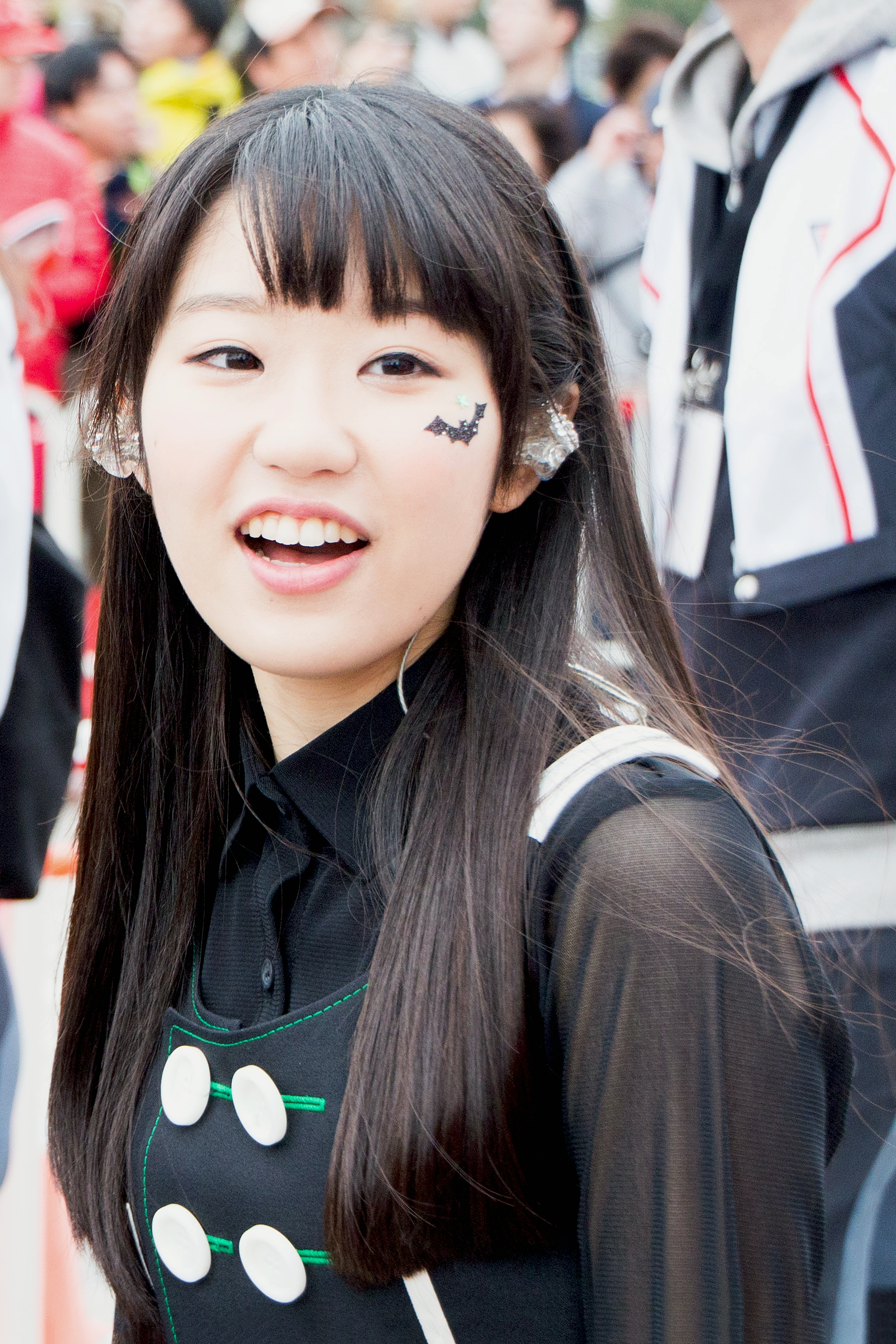
- Tōyama at T-SPOOK 2016
- Born: March 11, 1992 (age 34); Tokyo, Japan
- Education: Waseda University
- Occupations: Voice actress; singer
- Years active: 2010–present
- Agent: Intention
- Height: 152 cm (5 ft 0 in)
- Musical career
- Genre: J-Pop
- Instrument: Vocals
- Years active: 2017–present
- Label: Flying Dog
- Website: toyamanao.com

Nao Tōyama (東山 奈央, Tōyama Nao; born March 11, 1992) is a Japanese voice actress and singer affiliated with the agency Intention. She was a member of Arts Vision. She debuted as a voice actress in 2010, and played her first leading role as Kanon Nakagawa in The World God Only Knows. She is also known for her roles as Chitoge Kirisaki in Nisekoi, Yui Yuigahama in My Youth Romantic Comedy Is Wrong, As I Expected, Chiho Sasaki in The Devil Is a Part-Timer!, Tomoe Koga in Rascal Does Not Dream of Bunny Girl Senpai, Karen Kujō in Kin-iro Mosaic, Ruka Sarashina in Rent-A-Girlfriend, Rin Shima in Laid-Back Camp and Giselle Gewelle in Bleach: Thousand-Year Blood War. In 2019, she won the Best Supporting Actress Award with Yū Serizawa and the Game Award in the 13th Seiyu Awards.

Her music career began when she released songs for The World God Only Knows under her character name Kanon Nakagawa. She later made her solo debut as a singer on February 1, 2017, with the release of the double A-side single "True Destiny" / "Chain the World" under the Flying Dog label. She also voiced a member of the music unit Walküre, which performed songs as part of the Macross franchise.

== Biography ==
=== Early life and education ===
Tōyama was born in Tokyo. Her father had spent nine years abroad and frequently spoke in English at home. From an early age she had an interest in anime, in particular the series Ojamajo Doremi and Sailor Moon. However, it was the anime series Fullmetal Alchemist that was the first to inspire her to become a voice actress. She met Romi Park.

While in junior high school and high school, she became part of a chorus club to help her overcome tone deafness. It was also during this time she decided to pursue a voice acting career, as she had interacted with schoolmates who had similar interests. Her parents approved of her decision, provided that she did well in university entrance exams. While in high school, she enrolled at the Japan Narration Acting Institute. After completing her training, she became affiliated with the voice acting agency Arts Vision.

=== Voice acting career ===
Tōyama made her voice acting debut, starring in the original video animation Hiyokoi. That same year, she played her first main role as Kanon Nakagawa in the anime series The World God Only Knows. The following year, she was cast as Yune in Croisée in a Foreign Labyrinth and Margot Knight in Horizon in the Middle of Nowhere.

In 2012, Tōyama played the roles of Shiori Terashima in Symphogear, Ako Atarashi in Saki, and Shino Enjōji in Kokoro Connect. The following year, she was cast as the characters Karen Kujō in Kin-iro Mosaic, Yukiho Kōsaka in Love Live!, Yui Yuigahama in My Teen Romantic Comedy SNAFU, and Mana Natsukawa in Oreshura. In 2014, she played the roles of Chitoge Kirisaki in Nisekoi, Kayo Gōtokuji in Sabagebu!, Himiko in Nobunaga the Fool, Momo Kawanagare in Ai Tenchi Muyo!, Sylvia Ikaruga Misurugi in Cross Ange, and Lieselotte Sherlock in Trinity Seven. That same year, she left Arts Vision and transferred to the agency Intention.

In 2015, Tōyama was cast as Mizuki Kawashima in The Idolmaster Cinderella Girls, Claudia Enfield in The Asterisk War, Lecty Eisenach in Sky Wizards Academy, and Shizuku Kurogane in Chivalry of a Failed Knight. The following year, she played the roles of Rin Suzunoki in Bakuon!!, Ami Kurata in Long Riders!, Reina Prowler in Macross Delta, Maria Imari in This Art Club Has a Problem!, and Nozomi Kasaki in Sound! Euphonium 2. In 2017, she played Ryōko Sonoda in Tsuki ga Kirei, and the following year, she voiced Rin Shima in Laid-Back Camp and Tomoe Koga in Rascal Does Not Dream of Bunny Girl Senpai.

=== Music career ===
In 2010, she released a number of singles and performed at various events for The World God Only Knows' as Kanon Nakagawa. In 2014, she became part of the music group Rhodanthe*, which performs theme songs for the Kin-iro Mosaic series. She has also released singles as her Idolmaster character Mizuki Kawashima. In 2016, she voiced a member of the in-universe music group Walküre, which performed songs for the anime series Macross Delta.

Tōyama made her solo music debut with the release of her first single "True Destiny" / "Chain the world" on February 1, 2017. The song "True Destiny" was used as the ending theme of the anime television series Chain Chronicle ~Haecceitas no Hikari~, and "Chain the world" was used as the opening theme of its movie version. Her second single "Ima Koko" / "Tsuki ga Kirei" was released on May 24, 2017; the song "Ima Koko" was used as the opening theme to the anime series Tsuki ga Kirei, while the song "Tsuki ga Kirei" was used as the series' ending theme. She released her first album Rainbow on October 25, 2017. In February 2018, she held a solo concert at the Nippon Budokan. Her official fanclub, "Niji no Wakka", was launched on the same day. She released her third single "Tomoshibi no Manima ni" on May 30, 2018. She released her second album Gunjō Infinity on April 3, 2019. She released her fourth single "Aruiteikō!" on February 5, 2020; the title song is used as the opening theme of the anime series Asteroid in Love.

== Filmography ==
=== Anime series ===
Year	Title	Role	Notes	Ref.
2010	Star Driver	Tiger Sugatame		
2010	The World God Only Knows	Kanon Nakagawa		
2011	Astarotte's Toy	Isold		
2011	Blue Exorcist	Nee-chan, Caliburn		
2011	Horizon on the Middle of Nowhere	Margot Knight		
2011	Croisée in a Foreign Labyrinth	Yune		
2011	Last Exile: Fam, the Last Wing	Félicité Collette		
2011	Yondemasuyo, Azazel-san	Female High-School Student (ep 5), Passerby (ep 6)		
2012	AKB0048	Vera		
2012	Beelzebub	Yuuko	Episode 53	
2012	Eureka Seven: AO	Noah, Maeve McCaffrey, Miyu Arata, Demo woman (ep 4)		
2012	Horizon in the Middle of Nowhere II	Margot Knight		
2012	Kokoro Connect	Shino Enjōji		
2012	Listen to Me, Girls. I Am Your Father!	Luna Fleur	Episode 10	
2012	Saki: Achiga-hen	Ako Atarashi		
2012	Senki Zesshō Symphogear	Shiori Terashima, Student A, Mother		
2012	The Pet Girl of Sakurasou	Momoko (ep 6), Girl A (ep 1)		
2013	AKB0048 next stage	Vera		
2013	Arpeggio of Blue Steel -Ars Nova-	Shizuka Hazumi		
2013	Day Break Illusion	Meltina Melvis		
2013	Galilei Donna	Karen	Episode 5	
2013	Kin-iro Mosaic	Karen Kujō		
2013	Love Live!	Yukiho Kōsaka		
2013	Maoyu	Little Sister Maid		
2013	Majestic Prince	Peko Yamada, Jane		
2013	My Teen Romantic Comedy SNAFU	Yui Yuigahama		
2013	Oreshura	Mana Natsukawa		
2013	Senki Zesshō Symphogear G	Shiori Terashima		
2013	Tamayura: More Aggressive	Tomo		
2013	The Devil Is a Part-Timer!	Chiho Sasaki		
2013	The World God Only Knows: Goddesses	Kanon Nakagawa, Apollo		
2013	Unlimited Psychic Squad	Yūgiri		
2014	Ai Tenchi Muyo!	Momo Kawanagare		
2014	Chaika – The Coffin Princess: Avenging Battle	Ursula Tatra 12		
2014	Cross Ange	Sylvia Ikaruga Misurugi, Olivier		
2014	Encouragement of Climb: Second Season	Honoka Kurosaki		
2014	Girl Friend Beta	Emi Sagara		
2014	Glasslip	Hina Fukami		
2014	Inugami-san to Nekoyama-san	Suzu Nekoyama		
2014	Love Live! 2nd Season	Yukiho Kōsaka		
2014	Magical Warfare	Mui Aiba		
2014	Nisekoi	Chitoge Kirisaki		
2014	No-Rin	Takumi Nakazawa		
2014	Nobunaga the Fool	Himiko		
2014	Noragami	Girl	Episode 5	
2014	Robot Girls Z	Doublas M2		
2014	Sabagebu!	Kayo Gōtokuji		
2014	Saki: The Nationals	Ako Atarashi		
2014	The Irregular at Magic High School	Pixie		
2014	Trinity Seven	Lieselotte Sherlock		
2015	Gate: Jieitai Kano Chi nite, Kaku Tatakaeri	Lelei la Lelena		
2015	Go! Princess PreCure	Pafu/Sayaka Kano		
2015	Hello!! Kin-iro Mosaic	Karen Kujō		
2015	Kantai Collection	Kongō class, Takao, Atago		
2015	Miritari!	Lieutenant Lutgalnikov		
2015	My Teen Romantic Comedy SNAFU TOO!	Yui Yuigahama		
2015	Nisekoi:	Chitoge Kirisaki		
2015	Rakudai Kishi no Cavalry	Shizuku Kurogane		
2015	Senki Zesshō Symphogear GX	Shiori Terashima		
2015	Sky Wizards Academy	Lecty Eisenach		
2015	The Asterisk War	Claudia Enfield		
2015	The Idolmaster Cinderella Girls	Mizuki Kawashima		
2015	The Idolmaster Cinderella Girls 2nd Season	Mizuki Kawashima		
2016	The Asterisk War 2nd Season	Claudia Enfield		
2016	Bakuon!!	Rin Suzunoki		
2016	Gate: Jieitai Kanochi nite, Kaku Tatakaeri – Enryuu-hen	Lelei la Lelena		
2016	Kono Bijutsubu ni wa Mondai ga Aru!	Maria Imari		
2016	Long Riders!	Ami Kurata		
2016	Luck & Logic	Venus		
2016	Macross Delta	Reina Prowler		
2016	Magical Girl Raising Project	Koyuki Himekawa / Snow White		
2016	Regalia: The Three Sacred Stars	Kei Tiesto		
2016	Sound! Euphonium 2	Nozomi Kasaki		
2016	Tanaka-kun Is Always Listless	Saya		
2017	Granblue Fantasy The Animation	Lyria		
2017	Chain Chronicle ~Light of Haecceitas~	Musica		
2017	Blue Exorcist: Kyoto Saga	Nee		
2017	Battle Girl High School	Nozomi Amano		
2017	Tsuki ga Kirei	Ryōko Sonoda		
2017	18if	Yurina Kanzaki		
2017	Classroom of the Elite	Honami Ichinose		
2017	Restaurant to Another World	Iris		
2018	Laid-Back Camp	Rin Shima		
2018	Beatless	Lacia		
2018	Last Hope	Chloe Lau		
2018	Kakuriyo: Bed and Breakfast for Spirits	Aoi Tsubaki		
2018	Devils' Line	Nanako Tenjō		
2018	Encouragement of Climb: Third Season	Honoka Kurosaki		
2018	Goblin Slayer	High Elf Archer		
2018	Rascal Does Not Dream of Bunny Girl Senpai	Tomoe Koga		
2018	Iroduku: The World in Colors	Kurumi Kawai		
2018	The Girl in Twilight	Mia Silverstone		
2018	Million Arthur	Coupy		
2018	Radiant	Miss Melba		
2019	The Magnificent Kotobuki	Ririko		
2019	Million Arthur 2nd Season	Coupy		
2019	Carole & Tuesday	Katy Kimura		
2019	How Heavy Are the Dumbbells You Lift?	Gina Boyd		
2019	Kochoki: Wakaki Nobunaga	Oichi, Nobuyuki Oda (child)		
2019	Oresuki	Chiharu "Tsubaki" Youki		
2019	Granblue Fantasy The Animation Season 2	Lyria		
2019	Kono Oto Tomare! Sounds of Life	Akira Dōjima		
2019	Welcome to Demon School! Iruma-kun	Crocell Keroli-Kuromu		
2019	Case File nº221: Kabukicho	Mary Morstan		
2019	The Disastrous Life of Saiki K.: Reawakened	Hii Suzumiya		
2020	Asteroid in Love	Mikage Sakurai		
2020	Room Camp	Rin Shima		
2020	Infinite Dendrogram	Xunyi		
2020	Gleipnir	Claire Aoki		
2020	Moriarty the Patriot	Louis James Moriarty (young)		
2020	My Teen Romantic Comedy SNAFU Climax	Yui Yuigahama		
2020	Rent-A-Girlfriend	Ruka Sarashina		
2020	Re:Zero − Starting Life in Another World Season 2	Daphne		
2021	Banished from the Hero's Party	Megria		
2021	Demon Slayer: Kimetsu no Yaiba – Entertainment District Arc	Suma		
2021	Laid-Back Camp: Season 2	Rin Shima		
2021	Peach Boy Riverside	Kibitsu Mikoto		
2021	Restaurant to Another World 2	Hilda		
2021	Remake Our Life!	Eiko Kawasegawa		
2021	Seirei Gensouki: Spirit Chronicles	Liselotte Cretia		
2021	Shinkansen Henkei Robo Shinkalion Z	Nagara Anjō		
2021	So I'm a Spider, So What?	Katia / Kanata Ōshima		
2021	The Aquatope on White Sand	Marina Yonekura		
2022	A Couple of Cuckoos	Hiro Segawa		
2022	Classroom of the Elite 2nd Season	Honami Ichinose		
2022	Encouragement of Climb: Next Summit	Honoka Kurosaki		
2022	Girls' Frontline	Kalina		
2022	Hanabi-chan Is Often Late	Tacoslot Sumi Horie		
2022	Heroines Run the Show	Arisa Takamizawa		
2022	KanColle: Someday in that Sea	Kongou, Haruna		
2022	Phantom of the Idol	Asahi Mogami		
2022	Rent-A-Girlfriend Season 2	Ruka Sarashina		
2022	Slow Loop	Niji Yoshinaga		
2022	The Devil Is a Part-Timer!!	Chiho Sasaki		
2022	The Genius Prince's Guide to Raising a Nation Out of Debt	Lowellmina Earthworld		
2023	Bleach: Thousand-Year Blood War	Giselle		
2023	Classroom for Heroes	Sophie		
2023	Goblin Slayer II	High Elf Archer		
2023	Handyman Saitou in Another World	Lafanpan		
2023	I Got a Cheat Skill in Another World and Became Unrivaled in the Real World, Too	Night		
2023	I Shall Survive Using Potions!	Celestine		
2023	My Tiny Senpai	Hoshi Ayukawa		
2023	Rent-A-Girlfriend Season 3	Ruka Sarashina		
2023	Ron Kamonohashi's Forbidden Deductions	Mofu Usaki		
2023	Shy	Iko Koishikawa		
2023	Spy Classroom	Sibylla		
2023	Tearmoon Empire	Rafina Orca Belluga		
2024	365 Days to the Wedding	Claudia		
2024	A Sign of Affection	Ema Nakazono		
2024	Classroom of the Elite 3rd Season	Honami Ichinose		
2024	Grandpa and Grandma Turn Young Again	Shiori		
2024	Grendizer U	Hikaru Makiba		
2024	How I Attended an All-Guy's Mixer	Kohaku		
2024	Jellyfish Can't Swim in the Night	Ariel		
2024	Laid-Back Camp: Season 3	Rin Shima		
2024	Nina the Starry Bride	Muhulum		
2024	The Foolish Angel Dances with the Devil	Yūka Tanabashi		
2024	The Magical Girl and the Evil Lieutenant Used to Be Archenemies	Spica		
2024	The Many Sides of Voice Actor Radio	Mekuru Yubisaki		
2024	The Misfit of Demon King Academy 2nd Season	Arcana		
2024	Train to the End of the World	Yōka Nakatomi		
2024	Whisper Me a Love Song	Kyou Amasawa		
2025	Aharen-san Is Indecipherable 2nd Season	Riku Tamanaha		
2025	Aquarion: Myth of Emotions	Haida		
2025	From Old Country Bumpkin to Master Swordsman	Allucia Citrus		
2025	Hell Teacher: Jigoku Sensei Nube	Noriko Nakajima		
2025	Ishura Season 2	Linaris the Obsidian		
2025	Maebashi Witches	Rinko Mitsuba		
2025	Mechanical Marie	Marie		
2025	Miru: Paths to My Future	Miho		
2025	Possibly the Greatest Alchemist of All Time	Maria		
2025	Sakamoto Days	Aoi Sakamoto		
2025	Harmony of Mille-Feuille	Kikka Sengoku		
2025	Your Forma	Bigga		
2026	Agents of the Four Seasons: Dance of Spring	Nazuna		
2026	Dandivine	Haru		
2026	Dark Machine: The Animation	Ark		
2026	The Villager of Level 999	Alice		
2026	Magical Girl Raising Project: Restart	Koyuki Himekawa / Snow White		
2026	My Stepmother and Stepsisters Aren't Wicked	Hachi Ura		
2026	Star Detective Precure!	Luluka Moria / Cure Arcana Shadow / Eclipse Shadow / Cure Arcana		
2026	Tune In to the Midnight Heart	Ao Hyakusai		

=== Original video animation ===
Year	Title	Role
2011	The World God Only Knows: Four People and an Idol	Kanon Nakagawa
2013	Assassination Classroom	Nagisa Shiota
2013	The World God Only Knows: Magical Star Kanon 100%	Kanon Nakagawa
2014	Nisekoi	Chitoge Kirisaki
2015	Nisekoi	Chitoge Kirisaki
2016	Bakuon!!	Rin Suzunoki
2016	Strike the Blood II	Yume Eguchi
2020	Oresuki: Oretachi no Game Set	Chiharu "Tsubaki" Youki
2023	Love Live! Nijigasaki High School Idol Club NEXT SKY	Isla
2024	Code Geass: Rozé of the Recapture	Catherine
2024	Girls und Panzer: Taicho War!	Éclair

=== Original net animation ===
Year	Title	Role
2019	7 Seeds	Natsu Iwashimizu
2022	Bastard!! -Heavy Metal, Dark Fantasy-	Sheila Tuel Meta-Ilicana

=== Anime films ===
Year	Title	Role
2011	Fullmetal Alchemist: The Sacred Star of Milos	Karina
2012	Blue Exorcist: The Movie	Nee
2013	Star Driver: The Movie	Tiger Sugatame
2015	Love Live! The School Idol Movie	Yukiho Kōsaka
2016	Pretty Cure All Stars: Everyone Singing♪ The Miracle Magic!	Puff/Pafu
2016	Suki ni Naru Sono Shunkan o: Kokuhaku Jikkō Iinkai	Arisa Takamizawa
2016	KanColle: The Movie	Kongō class, Chōkai, Ayanami, Shikinami
2017	Doraemon the Movie 2017: Great Adventure in the Antarctic Kachi Kochi	Yuka-tan
2017	Pretty Cure Dream Stars!	Puff/Pafu
2017	Trinity Seven the Movie: Eternity Library and Alchemic Girl	Lieselotte Sherlock
2018	Liz and the Blue Bird	Nozomi Kasaki
2018	Yo-kai Watch: Forever Friends	Tae Arihoshi
2019	Trinity Seven: Heavens Library & Crimson Lord	Lieselotte Sherlock
2019	Birthday Wonderland	Pipo
2019	Rascal Does Not Dream of a Dreaming Girl	Tomoe Koga
2020	Goblin Slayer: Goblin's Crown	High Elf Archer
2021	Kin-iro Mosaic: Thank You!!	Karen Kujō
2022	Laid-Back Camp Movie	Rin Shima
2023	Rascal Does Not Dream of a Sister Venturing Out	Tomoe Koga
2023	Rascal Does Not Dream of a Knapsack Kid	Tomoe Koga
2024	Ōmuro-ke	Ai Miwa
2025	Dream Animals: The Movie	Giraffe
2025	Whoever Steals This Book	Hirune Mikura
2026	Rascal Does Not Dream of a Dear Friend	Tomoe Koga
2026	Made in Abyss: Mezameru Shinpi	Sherumi

=== Video games ===
Year	Title	Role
2011	The Idolmaster Cinderella Girls	Mizuki Kawashima
2012	Under Night In-Birth	Vatista
2012	Skullgirls	Marie
2013	Drakengard 3	Mikhail
2013	Fairy Fencer F	Harley
2013	Kantai Collection	Kongō-class, Takao-class, Ayanami, Shikinami, Jervisn Javelin
2013	Monster Monpiece	Neff
2013	Yahari Game demo Ore no Seishun Love Come wa Machigatteiru.	Yui Yuigahama
2014	Crayon Shin-chan: Arashi wo Yobu Kasukabe Eiga Stars!	Toki
2014	Granblue Fantasy	Lyria, Pink Creature
2014	J-Stars Victory VS	Chitoge Kirisaki
2014	Nisekoi: Yomeiri!?	Chitoge Kirisaki
2015	Xblaze Lost: Memories	Nobody
2015	Battle Girl High School	Nozomi Amano
2015	Fate/Grand Order	Ibaraki Douji, Suzuka Gozen, Calamity Jane
2015	Closers	Yuri Asuma
2015	School of Ragnarok	Smileheart
2015	JoJo's Bizarre Adventure: Eyes of Heaven	Trish Una
2016	Digimon World: Next Order	Himari Oofuchi
2016	Star Ocean: Integrity and Faithlessness	Miki Sorvesta
2016	Super Robot Taisen OG: The Moon Dwellers	Festenia Muse
2016	Girl's Frontline	Kalina
2016	Yahari Game demo Ore no Seishun Rabukome wa Machigatteiru. Zoku	Yui Yuigahama
2017	The Legend of Heroes: Trails of Cold Steel III	Juna Crawford
2017	Fire Emblem Echoes: Shadows of Valentia	Celica
2017	Fire Emblem Heroes	Celica
2017	Fire Emblem Warriors	Celica
2018	The Legend of Heroes: Trails of Cold Steel IV	Juna Crawford
2018	Valkyria Chronicles 4	Riley Miller
2018	Metal Gear Survive	Virgil AT-9
2018	BlazBlue: Cross Tag Battle	Vatista
2018	Destiny Child	Hera
2018	Magia Record	Chisato Shion
2018	Judgment	Sana mihama
2019	Onmyoji	Shiranui
2019	Grimms Notes	Charlotte Grimm
2019	Umineko When They Cry	Piece
2020	The Legend of Heroes: Trails into Reverie	Juna Crawford
2022	Soul Hackers 2	Nana
2022	Tactics Ogre: Reborn	Iuria Wolph
2023	Fire Emblem Engage	Celica
2023	Blue Archive	Mika Misono
2023	Umamusume: Pretty Derby	Mejiro Ramonu
2023	Wo Long: Fallen Dynasty	Hong Jing
2023	Street Fighter 6	Kimberly
2023	Granblue Fantasy: Relink	Lyria
2023	Goblin Slayer Another Adventurer: Nightmare Feast	High Elf Archer
2024	Genshin Impact	Mualani
2026	Pragmata	Diana
2026	Nekopara: Sekai Connect	Brownie

=== Dubbing ===
- The Dark Crystal: Age of Resistance, Deet

== Discography ==
=== Singles ===
Release date	Title	Catalog No.	Oricon chart position
February 1, 2017	"True Destiny" / "Chain the world"	VTZL-119 (Limited Edition); VTCL-35252 (Regular Edition); VTCL-35253(Anime Edition)	13
May 24, 2017	"Imakoko" / "Tsuki ga Kirei" (イマココ / 月がきれい)	VTZL-128 (Limited Edition); VTCL-35256 (Regular Edition); VTCL-35257(Anime Edition)	11
May 30, 2018	"Tomoshibi no Manima ni" (灯火のまにまに)	VTZL-144 (Limited Edition); VTCL-35275 (Regular Edition); VTCL-35276(Anime Edition)	14
February 5, 2020	"Aruiteikō!" (歩いていこう！)	VTZL-165 (Limited Edition); VTCL-35312 (Regular Edition); VTCL-35313(Anime Edition)	6
October 23, 2024	"Hoshi no Dengon" (星の伝言)	VTZL-245 (Limited Edition); VTCL-35378 (Regular Edition); VTZL-246 (Anime Limited Edition)	10

=== Albums ===
Release date	Title	Catalog No.	Oricon chart position
October 25, 2017	Rainbow	VTZL-140 (Limited Edition); VTCL-60461 (Regular Edition)	12
April 3, 2019	Gunjō Infinity (群青インフィニティ)	VTZL-156 (Limited Edition); VTCL-60495 (Regular Edition)	

=== Video releases ===
Release date	Title	Catalog No.	Oricon chart position
May 30, 2018	Nao Toyama 1st LIVE「Rainbow」at Nippon Budoukan	VTXL-33 (BD)	17
