= Strange House (disambiguation) =

Strange House is the debut studio album by English rock band the Horrors.

Strange House may also refer to:

- A Strange House, a Japanese suspense film starring Shotaro Mamiya
- The Strange House, a Chinese horror thriller film
- Strange Houses, a mystery novel written by Uketsu
