= Strange Pictures =

2022 novel by Uketsu

- Author: Uketsu
- Language: Japanese
- Genre: Suspense
- Publisher: Futabasha (Japanese) HarperVia (English US) Pushkin Vertigo an imprint of Pushkin Press (English UK)
- Publication date: October 20, 2022 (Japanese); January 14, 2025 (English)
- Publication place: Japan
- Pages: 376 (Japanese); 240 (English)
- ISBN: 978-4575528138

Strange Pictures (変な絵, Hen na e) is a 2022 mystery novel by Japanese YouTuber and writer Uketsu, published by Futabasha. An English translation by Jim Rion was published in the United States by HarperVia in 2025, and in the United Kingdom by Pushkin Vertigo, an imprint of Pushkin Press that same year. Since its release, the book has been translated to over 30 languages and sold over 1.5 million copies.

== Plot ==
The book contains several stories focusing on various characters and drawings related to murders, disappearences, or other phenomenon, all of which are connected at the end. A psychologist delivers a lecture on a girl who murdered her physically abusive mother, stating that her rehabilitation was possible because of the psychological contents of her drawing. A college student goes through a blog run by a man going by Raku online, whose wife Yuki died in childbirth, leaving behind encoded drawings suggesting she was murdered.

The third chapter follows Naomi Konno trying to find Yuta Konno, her grandson, through a drawing he made in class. It is revealed he is the child of Yuki and "Raku" whose real name is Haruto Konno - both dead. The next chapter takes place several years in the past. A budding journalist, Iwata, investigates the murder of his high school art teacher, Yoshiharu Miura, via a drawing he made, but is killed by Naomi, his wife. Yoshiharu's college friend Toyokawa, the prime suspect, is found dead via suicide with a confession to both murders.

The last chapter tells the story in chronological order. Naomi was the girl who murdered her mother and made the drawing in the first chapter. As an adult, two friends, Toyokawa and Yoshiharu, competed for her love. Naomi married Yoshiharu, but when he started abusing their son, Haruto, Naomi murdered him. Yuki, Yoshiharu's former highschool student, started spending time with Naomi and Haruto, a child at the time. Toyokawa reveals he witnessed the murder, and leveraging it as blackmail, rapes Naomi. Naomi finds out through Yuki that Iwata is investigating Yoshiharu's murder, so she kills Iwata and then Toyokawa to take the fall.

Years later, Haruto and Yuki get married. Naomi was apprehensive about their age gap and Yuki's confession that she was in love with Yoshiharu, whom Haruto reminds her of. When Yuki became pregnant, Naomi gave Yuki salt pills that would increase the chance of her dying at birth due to existing complications, in order to raise Yuta as her own. Yuki had a premonition of her death and makes the drawings that Haruto uploaded on his blog as Raku. After her death, Haruto decoded the drawings and committed suicide. The novel goes back to the present: Naomi is arrested, and Yuta is adopted by the detective who tracked her down.

== Background and composition ==
With regard to the book's inspiration, Uketsu stated that they were interested in "drawing tests" used in psychoanalysis, after which they endeavored to write a work of suspense that involved deriving a story from pictures that were "scary and eerie."

Flaunt wrote that, in the novel, "the boundaries between detective and reader, between fiction and reality, begin to blur: university students discover a blog recounting a woman's pregnancy, a child draws a haunted photo of his home, the victim of a murder sketches a picture in his final moments." The Critic called the book "An interesting approach" "with hidden clues in numerous pictures and diagrams that are reproduced in the story, but also a fine guide to the personal tensions bound up in Japanese social structures." Japan Nakama lauded the book's interactiveness insofar as it allowed readers to lead the investigation of "the truth" of the plot.

ABC News stated that "Uketsu's storytelling combines images and diagrams with text to draw readers into a horrific puzzle that they witness gradually getting solved, piece by piece. The pictures serve as whodunit clues to chillingly gruesome happenings." Telegraph called Uketsu a possible Richard Osman-like writer for Japan, stating that the book was "a collection of eerie mystery stories, ingeniously connected to each other in ways that only become apparent towards the end of the book. It is a highly visual work, full of pictures that readers must study intently to solve a succession of horrifying murders."

== Adaptations ==
In March 2024, a manga adaptation, drawn by Aiba Kiko, was announced and released in Manga Action.

== See also ==
- Strange Houses
- The Strange House (manga)
