= The Man Who Died Seven Times =

1995 Japanese novel by Yasuhiko Nishizawa

The Man Who Died Seven Times (七回死んだ男) is a 1995 Japanese novel by Yasuhiko Nishizawa. Jesse Kirkwood translated the English version, published in 2025 by Pushkin Vertigo. It was the first book by Nishizawa to be published in English.

The novel is about a 16-year old boy, Hisataro, trying to figure out who is trying to kill his grandfather, Reijiro Fuchigami. Hisataro has a condition where he experiences some days nine times, and in the process is trying to prevent a murder he knows will occur, but each time he experiences the events, a different person kills Reijiro.

== Reception ==
Kirkus Reviews describes the "twist" as "engaging", and book overall as "fresh and clever".

Publishers Weekly described the work as "lighthearted" and whimsical.

Laura Wilson of The Guardian described it as "An ingenious and highly entertaining riff".
