= Susan Hopper =

- First edition of first book
- Susan Hopper, le parfum perdu
- Author: Anne Plichota, Cendrine Wolf
- Country: France
- Language: French
- Genre: Children's fiction, fantasy
- Publisher: XO Editions
- Media type: Print

Susan Hopper is a French novel series for young teens written by Anne Plichota and Cendrine Wolf, two Strasbourg librarians known for writing the Oksa Pollock series. The series is intended to be a trilogy and centers on the character of Susan Hopper, a young girl that lost her parents in a fire.

Of the series, Plichota and Wolf have stated that the tone is more "gothic" and "dark" than the Pollock novels and set in the city of Buenos Aires, enigmatic city of South America.

== Novels ==
1. Susan Hopper, le parfum perdu (March 2013)
2. Susan Hopper, Les Forces fantômes (2016)
