= Strange Houses =

2021 novel by Uketsu

- Cover of the 2025 Pushkin Press edition
- Author: Uketsu
- Original title: 変な家
- Language: Japanese English
- Genre: Horror Crime Mystery
- Publisher: Asuka Shinsha (Japanese); HarperVia (US Pressing); Pushkin Vertigo (UK Pressing)
- Publication date: July 22, 2021 (Japanese); June 3, 2025 (English)
- Pages: 248 pages (Japanese); 208 pages (English)
- ISBN: 978-4864108454

Strange Houses (変な家, Hen na ie) is a 2021 novel by Japanese YouTuber and writer, Uketsu, published by Asuka Shinsha. It was translated into English by Jim Rion and was published in the United States by HarperVia in 2025, and in the United Kingdom by Pushkin Vertigo, a crime and mystery genre imprint of Pushkin Press in the same year. In Japan, Strange Pictures was preceded by Strange Houses, while the publication order was reversed in the Western market. It has three sequels: Strange Pictures, Strange Buildings, and Strange Maps.

== Synopsis ==
A writer is asked to examine the floor plan of a house with a peculiar design. With the help of Kurihara, he analyzes a number of puzzling features and inconsistencies in the architecture, including concealed spaces, that suggest that the house may have been built to facilitate a crime. Their curiosity expanded their search to other properties, past incidents, and a slew of characters that revealed a much more sinister connection.

== Background and composition ==
In 2020, the concept for the novel started as a YouTube mystery video and a simultaneous story published on the fictional story site, Omokoro, that the author posted about a series of floor plans, after which he was advised to adapt the material into a full-length novel.

During the editorial phase of the English edition, Rion and an editor noticed a significant plot hole that was never resolved by any of the characters in the original Japanese publication. When they reached out to Uketsu about the possibility of adding something to clarify the plot hole, his response was of surprise, as he said, “In the two years since publication not a single person has even asked about that.” He incorporated a new afterword "by Kurihara" for the new mass market paperback edition. Uketsu proposed adding the afterword and making amendments in the English edition that would incorporate the plot hole into Kurihara's doubts.

Uketsu told in an interview with Toyo Keizai Online, "The reason I debuted with 'Strange House' and wrote a novel that wasn't in the mainstream was because I lacked the skills to write a mainstream novel. At that time, I had no choice but to throw balls. From those negatives, I wrote my weaknesses backwards."

== Adaptations ==
In 2023, Ichijinsha's Comic Howl released a manga adaptation, written and drawn by Kyō Ayano.

A movie adaptation directed by Jun'ichi Ishikawa was released in 2024.

== See also ==
- Uketsu
- Strange Pictures
- Strange Pictures (manga)
