= Ruriko Aoki =

Japanese voice actress

- 青木 瑠璃子
- Born: March 24, 1990 (age 36); Saitama Prefecture, Japan
- Occupation: Voice actress
- Years active: 2009–present
- Agent: Asleben
- Height: 170 cm (5 ft 7 in)

Ruriko Aoki (青木瑠璃子, Aoki Ruriko; born March 24, 1990) is a Japanese voice actress affiliated with Asleben. She voiced Riina Tada in The Idolmaster Cinderella Girls, for which she received a top-ten charting single. She also voiced Ranra in The World Is Still Beautiful, Yucho La in Idol Memories, Katrina in RoboMasters: The Animated Series, and Marin in Hyrule Warriors Legends.

== Biography ==
Ruriko Aoki was born on 24 March 1990 in Saitama Prefecture. In junior high school, Aoki became conscious of the profession of voice actors for the first time. She was a member of the high school broadcasting club, where she worked in production, advertising, and announcer work. Aoki went to university aiming at broadcasting relations because there were a wide range of possibilities.

In 2014, she was cast as Ranra in The World Is Still Beautiful. In 2017, she was cast as Katrina in RoboMasters: The Animated Series. She voices Ayu in the second episode of Hakata Mentai! Pirikarako-chan, which aired in 2019.

She voiced Riina Tada in The Idolmaster Cinderella Girls. Riina Tana's single, released on 23 January 2013, charted at #7 in the Oricon Singles Chart on 4 February 2013. She reprised her Idolmaster role in the Cinderella Girls Theater, and also appears in several albums and singles made for Cinderella Girls. She later said in an interview that she called the producers' voices the best part of the Cinderella Girls' first live concert in April 2014. She also voices the Chinese-born Yucho La in Idol Memories.

She voices Marin in Hyrule Warriors Legends, for which she also appeared in a gameplay video released in January 2016. Aoki said in an interview with Famitsu that, as a kid, she was a fan of the Legend of Zelda video game franchise. Aoki appeared in NHK's Symphonic Gamers concert in October 2016. She also makes an appearance in a March 2016 magazine/book for Splatoon.

== Personal life ==
Aoki has a younger brother.

== Filmography ==
=== Anime ===
2012

- Ginga e Kickoff!!, schoolgirl
- Shirokuma Cafe, elementary school student
- Sword Art Online, player
- My Little Monster, Maki
- Yu-Gi-Oh! Zexal, researcher

2013

- Day Break Illusion, Priscilla Twilight
- Samurai Flamenco, convenience store clerk, girl B
- Namiuchigiwa no Muromi-san, mermaid #2

2014

- Your Lie in April, audience, announcement, broadcasting club Girls
- The World Is Still Beautiful, Ranra
- Noragami, Keiichi's mom, teacher
- Hamatora, high school girl, newscaster

2015

- The Idolmaster Cinderella Girls, Riina Tada
- Cross Ange, Nonna

2016

- Idol Memories, Yucho La

2017

- Yowamushi Pedal: New Generation, student
- Sakura Quest, young Noge
- RoboMasters: The Animated Series, Katrina

2018

- Anonymous Noise, homeroom teacher
- Takunomi, Mama Kiriyama
- Umamusume: Pretty Derby, Air Groove
- Xuan Yuan Sword Luminary, Muyu Rou

2019

- Hakata Mentai! Pirikarako-chan, Ayu (ep 2)

2021

- PuraOre! Pride of Orange, Juri Kikuchi
- Muv-Luv Alternative, Yūko Kōzuki
- Komi Can't Communicate, Nene Onemine

2022

- The Rising of the Shield Hero 2, Eclair Seaetto
- Lucifer and the Biscuit Hammer, Kil Zonne

2023

- Handyman Saitou in Another World, Franlil
- Saving 80,000 Gold in Another World for My Retirement, Elinu
- The Café Terrace and Its Goddesses, Ōka Makuzawa
- Blue Orchestra, Tsubasa Takahashi
- Beyblade X, Meiko Meiden

2024

- Beastars Final Season, Azuki

2025

- Hands Off: Sawaranaide Kotesashi-kun, Miyuki Hongō

2026

- Fist of the North Star, Mamiya
- Let's Go Kaikigumi, Mechako
- Saved by the Ice Cold Prince's Embrace, Cheryl Sashebal
- The Ghost in the Shell, Tomiliand Robots
- Dandivine, Yūga Shinonome
- Red River, Queen Nadia.

=== Anime film ===
2012

- Wolf Children

2024

- Mononoke the Movie: Phantom in the Rain, Matsu

2025

- 100 Meters, Mother

=== Video games ===
2009

- Lord of Vermilion, Byūnei

2010

- Lord of Arcana, female player voice

2012

- The Idolmaster Cinderella Girls, Riina Tada
- E.X. Troopers, Yuna
- Kaizoku Fantasia, Rinon

2013

- Ken ga Kimi, Hattori Hanzō

2014

- White Cat Project Anna, Kathy, Lupinous
- Rage of Bahamut, Reizu

2015

- Ukiyo-no-Shishi, dragon
- Ken ga Kimi for V, Hattori Hanzō

2016

- Hyrule Warriors Legends, Marin
- Ensemble Girls!, Mai Anjou
- Icchibanketsu Online, Mikoshinyūdō, Fukusuke
- Girls' Frontline as M500, M590

2017

- Alternative Girls, Natalie Nakata

2018

- Far Cry 5, Kim Lai
- Octopath Traveler, Tresa Corzone
- WarioWare Gold as Mona, 5-Volt, Mimi

2019

- Touhou Cannonball, Sakuya Izayoi

2020

- Azur Lane, HMS Dido HMS Sirius

2021

- WarioWare: Get It Together! as Mona, 5-Volt
- Umamusume: Pretty Derby, Air Groove

2022

- Witch on the Holy Night, Touko Aozaki

2023

- Fire Emblem Engage as Marni (Maron), Madeline
- Crymachina, Mikoto Sengiku
- WarioWare: Move It! as Mona, 5-Volt, Cicada

2024

- Ex Astris, Starling

=== Dubbing ===
2013

- Hostages, Morgan Sanders
- Rizzoli & Isles

2014

- Endeavour
- Person of Interest Season 4, Claire Mahoney
- Bates Motel, Hayden

2026

- Primate, Hannah

=== Digital comics ===
2012

- Milenovich, schoolgirl,

2013

- Kono Oto Tomare! Sounds of Life, sempai
