= The World Is Still Beautiful =

Japanese manga series

- First tankōbon volume cover, featuring Nike Lemercier

それでも世界は美しい (Soredemo Sekai wa Utsukushii)
- Genre: Adventure; Fantasy; Romantic comedy
- Manga
- Written by: Dai Shiina
- Published by: Hakusensha
- Imprint: Hana to Yume Comics
- Magazine: Hana to Yume
- Original run: March 5, 2009 – May 20, 2020
- Volumes: 25
- Anime television series
- Directed by: Hajime Kamegaki
- Produced by: Marina Sasaki; Shirō Ishihara; Tomohiro Shindō; Toshio Nakatani; Yuka Ōshima
- Written by: Shinzō Fujita
- Music by: Kousuke Yamashita
- Studio: Studio Pierrot
- Licensed by: NA: Sentai Filmworks
- Original network: Nippon TV
- Original run: April 6, 2014 – June 29, 2014
- Episodes: 12
- icon

The World Is Still Beautiful (Japanese: それでも世界は美しい, Hepburn: Soredemo Sekai wa Utsukushii) is a Japanese manga series written and illustrated by Dai Shiina. It started with a one-shot published in Hakusensha's shōjo manga Hana to Yume in March 2009, which was followed by a second one in June of that same year and a third one in September 2011. It began a regular serialization in the same magazine in December 2011 and finished in May 2020; its chapters were collected in 25 tankōbon volumes. A 12-episode anime television series adaptation by Studio Pierrot aired on Nippon Television between April and June 2014.

== Plot ==
Nike, the fourth princess of the Rain Dukedom, possesses the power to call forth the rain. She travels to the Sun Kingdom to marry Sun King Livius for the sake of her country, despite her own reluctance. She soon discovers that the King, who conquered the world in only three years after his ascendance to the throne, is still a child. Furthermore, for trivial reasons, he has demanded that Nike call forth the rain, and when she refuses, he has her thrown in jail. The story follows the two who, while at first are a married couple only in name, gradually begin to establish an emotional bond with one another.

== Characters ==
=== Main characters ===
Nike Lemercier (ニケ・ルメルシエ, Nike Rumerushie)
Voiced by: Rena Maeda
The fourth and youngest princess of the Rain Dukedom, Nike can summon rain through song. Forced to marry the Sun King Livius after losing a game to her sisters, she resents her fate but later grows fond of him upon realizing he is still a child. Kind yet strong-willed, she wins public admiration through compassion and physical prowess, even defeating palace guards. Though she forgives Rani for attempting to kill her, she retaliates by overpowering him.
Livius Orvinus Ifrikia (リヴィウス・オルヴィヌス・イフリキア, Riviusu Oruvinusu Ifurikia) / Livius I (リヴィウス一世, Riviusu-Issei)
Voiced by: Nobunaga Shimazaki, Haruka Kudō (younger)
Livius, the child king of the Sun Kingdom, conquers the world within three years of his reign. The son of the former king and a commoner mother, he lived isolated in the palace until her death. A skilled ruler, he eliminates government corruption and defeats rival nations. He demands Princess Nike as his bride in exchange for sparing her homeland, eventually developing affection for her. Raised among enemies, Livius grows cold and distrustful after his mother's death. Though often childish, he reacts violently when those he cares about are threatened. His jealousy leads him to imprison his uncle and threaten Nike's homeland when suspecting betrayal, revealing his lingering capacity for cruelty.
Neil (ニール, Nīru)
Voiced by: Tomokazu Sugita
Neil is Livius's butler and tutor who often accompanies Livius during his travels. He seems to understand Livius and he cares about him a great deal. When Nike arrives it is he who provides her with pertinent information and helps her fit into her new life as Livius' prospective Queen.

=== Sun Kingdom ===
Bardwin Cecil Ifrikia (バルドウィン・シシル・イフリキア, Barudouin Shishiru Ifurikia) / Bard (バルド, Barudo)
Voiced by: Takahiro Sakurai
Bard (short for Bardwin) is Livius's uncle and the former Prime Minister of the Sun Kingdom until he fled mysteriously. Apart from that, he is also flirty and likes to tease Livius, causing the two to have a shaky relationship and to disagree a lot. After they manage to reestablish their relationship as family thanks to Nike, Livius reappoints Bard as the Prime Minister again.
Sheila (シーラ, Shīra)
Voiced by: Keiko Han
Sheila is Livius's mother and consort of the former king of the Sun Kingdom. As she and her son were both discriminated by the people due to having a lower social status and coming from a "low-class", both of them lived a quiet life together until she died, which affected Livius's entire world.
Ranra (ランラ), Sūnya (スーニャ),and Mikia (ミキア)
Voiced by: Ruriko Aoki (Ranra), Mizuki Ōtsuka (Sūnya), Uki Satake (Mikia)
Nike's personal maids who take joy in dressing her. They often tell her about the affairs in the castle.
Vordan (ヴォーダン, Vuōdan), Ratcliff (ラトクリフ, Ratokurifu), and Catesby (ケイツビー, Keitsubī)
Voiced by: Shūichi Ikeda (Vordan), Kōsei Tomita (Ratcliff), Issei Futamata (Catesby)
Royal advisors of the Sun Kingdom.
Rani Aristes (ラニ・アリステス, Rani Arisutesu)
Voiced by: Daisuke Namikawa
The high priest from the Ministry of Priesthood of the Sun Kingdom and is in-charge of Livius's and Nike's marriage and engagement affairs.
Jaina (ジャイナ)
Voiced by: Kenji Nomura
The royal chef of the Sun Kingdom and head of the kitchens. He sometimes treats Nike to food despite Carl's insistence for her to lose weight.
Miranda (ミランダ)
Voiced by: Yōko Sōmi
The reporter of the Sun Kingdom's Royal Family Bulletin.
Carl (カール, Kāru)
Voiced by: Takeharu Ōnishi
The Sun Kingdom's top designer. He has a firm belief that his designs will make anyone look beautiful and is mainly in charge of putting together Nike's ballgowns for prestigious occasions.

=== Rain Dukedom ===
Tohara (トハラ)
Voiced by: Chisa Yokoyama
Tohara is the previous sovereign of the Rain Dukedom, Nike's grandmother, and rain-summoning teacher. Even though Teteru is the reigning duke, Tohara is the true decision-maker, her words being law that even the royal family cannot go against.
Teteru Lemercier (テテル・ルメルシエ, Teteru Rumerushie)
Voiced by: Toshiharu Sakurai
Teteru is the reigning duke of the Rain Dukedom, Nike's father, and Tohara's son-in-law. The "Duke" is only a title, however, as Tohara is the true mastermind of the Rain Dukedom.
Iraha (イラハ)
Voiced by: Michie Tomizawa
Iraha is Nike's mother and the daughter of Tohara. She has always been sickly and often seen on her sickbed.
Mira Lemercier (ミラ・ルメルシエ, Mira Rumerushie)
Voiced by: Mariya Ise
Mira is Nike's oldest sister. She is the first princess of the Rain Dukedom & specializes in making rain.
Nia Lemercier (ニア・ルメルシエ, Nia Rumerushie)
Voiced by: Ai Kayano
Nia is Nike's second older sister. She is the second princess of the Rain Dukedom & specializes in making wind.
Kara Lemercier (カラ・ルメルシエ, Kara Rumerushie)
Voiced by: Yuka Terasaki
Kara is Nike's third older sister. She is the third princess of the Rain Dukedom & specializes in mentation (medicine).
Kitora (キトラ)
Voiced by: Takayuki Kondō, Maasa Kobayashi (child)
Kitora is Nike's cousin. He lost his parents when he was a child, so he and Nike were raised together by Tohara. Kitora was unable to use his powers when he was a child and gave up quickly; he admires Nike for being able to push through hardships in order to be able to summon rain. It is implied that he has romantic feelings for Nike.
Aki (アキ)
Voiced by: Norihiro Inoue
Aki is member of the royal family of the Rain Dukedom and Tohara's nephew.

=== Others ===
Amaluna Luirasael (アマルナ・ルイラサエル, Amaruna Ruirasaeru) / Luna (ルナ, Runa)
Voiced by: Yuki Matsuoka
The first Princess of Sea Kingdom (with two older brothers) and Livius' childhood friend. Before, she was in love with Livius but realised that Nike was a more suitable match and is currently engaged to Marquiz Fortis, Duke of The Autonomous State of Fortis.

== Media ==
=== Manga ===
Written and illustrated by Dai Shiina, The World Is Still Beautiful started with three one-shots published in Hakusensha's shōjo manga magazine Hana to Yume; the first was published on March 5, 2009; the second was published on June 5, 2009; and the third was published on September 5, 2011. (Note: The first two one-shots were released in 2009; the first one in the magazine's seventh issue, released on March 5, and the second one in the thirteenth issue, released on June 5.) It started its regular serialization in the magazine on December 20, 2011, and finished on May 20, 2020. Hakusensha collected its chapters in 25 tankōbon volumes, released from December 20, 2011, to August 20, 2020.

==== Volumes ====
No.	Release date	ISBN
1	December 20, 2011	978-4-592-18872-8
2	June 20, 2012	978-4-592-19472-9
3	December 20, 2012	978-4-592-19473-6
4	April 19, 2013	978-4-592-19474-3
5	August 20, 2013	978-4-592-19475-0
6	January 20, 2014	978-4-592-19476-7
7	April 18, 2014	978-4-592-19477-4
8	September 19, 2014	978-4-592-19478-1
9	January 20, 2015	978-4-592-19479-8
10	June 19, 2015	978-4-592-21570-7
11	October 20, 2015	978-4-592-21571-4
12	February 19, 2016	978-4-592-21572-1
13	June 20, 2016	978-4-592-21573-8
14	October 20, 2016	978-4-592-21574-5
15	February 20, 2017	978-4-592-21575-2
16	June 20, 2017	978-4-592-21576-9
17	November 20, 2017	978-4-592-21577-6
18	February 20, 2018	978-4-592-21578-3
19	June 20, 2018	978-4-592-21579-0
20	October 19, 2018	978-4-592-21580-6
21	February 20, 2019	978-4-592-21325-3
22	June 20, 2019	978-4-592-21637-7
23	October 18, 2019	978-4-592-21638-4
24	May 20, 2020	978-4-592-21639-1
25	August 20, 2020	978-4-592-21640-7

=== Anime ===
A 12-episode anime television series adaptation, produced by Nippon Television, VAP, Hakusensha and Studio Pierrot, aired on Nippon TV from April 6 to June 29, 2014. (Note: Nippon TV listed the series air dates on Saturday at 26:20, which is effectively Sunday at 2:20 a.m. JST.) It was directed by Hajime Kamegaki, with Shinzō Fujita handling series composition, Ichirō Uno designing the characters, and Kousuke Yamashita composing the music. The opening theme song is "Beautiful World", performed by Joanna Koike, while the ending theme song is "Promise", performed by Rena Maeda. The series features an insert song, "Amefurashi no Uta: Beautiful Rain" (アメフラシの歌 ～Beautiful Rain～), performed by Maeda, and another one, titled "Ame Okuri no Uta" (雨おくりの歌; lit. 'Song for Sending Off the Rain'), performed by Chisa Yokoyama.

In North America, the series was licensed by Sentai Filmworks, which released the series on home video format on October 6, 2015.

==== Episodes ====
No.	Title	Directed by	Written by	Original release date
1	"The Sun Kingdom"; Transliteration: "Hare no taikoku" (Japanese: 晴れの大国)	Hajime Kamegaki	Shinzō Fujita	April 6, 2014
Nike, the fourth and youngest princess of the Rain Kingdom, arrives in the Sun Kingdom after losing a bet with her sisters, forcing her to wed the Sun King—a ruler rumored to be a merciless conqueror who subdued the world within three years of his ascension. Her arrival is met with immediate misfortune: her possessions are stolen, leaving her stranded, and the hostile locals scorn her due to her kingdom's impoverished status and worthless currency. A compassionate commoner family shelters her, and Nike vows to repay their kindness. When their eldest daughter is mistakenly kidnapped, Nike intervenes, wielding her power over weather to defeat the assailants and compel them to escort her to the palace. Upon arrival, she is stunned to discover that the Sun King, her betrothed and the world's feared conqueror, is merely a child.
2	"The Rain Princess"; Transliteration: "Ame no kōjō" (Japanese: 雨の公女)	Hiroki Takagi	Shinzō Fujita	April 13, 2014
Livius I, the Sun King, is revealed to be a child, leaving Nike stunned. Upon learning she is the Rain Princess, he demands she summon rain for his entertainment. Refusing, Nike insists she cannot call rain without first witnessing the world's beauty. Livius offers lavish gifts—fine dresses, exquisite meals—but she clarifies she means the natural world. Over time, Nike realizes Livius perceives no beauty in his surroundings and resolves to show him, but their efforts are interrupted when an assassin targets him. Nike shoves Livius aside, taking an arrow herself, though it misses vital organs. Fearing for her safety, Livius sends her away by carriage. Soon after, a second assassination attempt occurs: the palace is set ablaze with Livius trapped inside. Seeing the smoke, Nike rushes back and summons a downpour to extinguish the flames. As the rain clears, a rainbow appears—and for the first time, Livius smiles.
3	"Chancellor's Declaration"; Transliteration: "Kanpaku sengen" (Japanese: 関白宣言)	Tomoya Tanaka	Shinzō Fujita	April 20, 2014
Livius hosts a party to present Nike as his bride. When foreign nobles mock her, he retaliates before resting his head in her lap. Their ensuing argument leaves Nike hurt, believing him uncaring. That night, she dreams of Livius as a child with his late mother. Learning he picks her daily flowers himself, Nike smiles, calling him "an idiot". Though absent for most of the event, Nike makes a dramatic entrance with wind-scattered rose petals. After thanking guests, she sings while summoning rain, mesmerizing all present.
4	"Ring of tales ①"	Yoshinori Otaka	Seiko Takagi	April 27, 2014
The Ministry of Priesthood annuls Nike's engagement to Livius, deeming her Rain Kingdom heritage unsuitable for royalty. When both refuse to accept this, the Priesthood imposes the Rite of Illumination—a deadly trial where Nike must retrieve an ancient wedding ring from a temple cave. Livius reveals the rite's grim history: many princesses who attempted it never returned alive.
5	"Ring of tales ②"	Seimei Kidokoro	Seiko Takagi	May 4, 2014
Nike begins the Rite of Illumination only to discover the ring is missing and the cave surrounded by Priesthood members—exposing their centuries-long use of the trial to eliminate "unworthy" royal brides. As they attack, Livius appears via a secret tunnel and aids her escape. Without rings for their engagement ceremony, Nike conjures a white rainbow encircling the sun. When a failed assassin exposes Livius's illegal cave entry—unintentionally confessing their plot—Nike forgives them despite execution being justified. The lead assassin acknowledges her influence on Livius's growth, and the head priest officially recognizes their engagement.
6	"Call my name"	Kenichirō Komaya	Shinzō Fujita	May 11, 2014
Luna of the Ocean Kingdom, a childhood acquaintance of Livius, arrives claiming to be his true fiancée despite his clear disinterest. She torments Nike by outperforming her in all activities. Consumed by jealousy after witnessing Livius's happiness with Nike, Luna challenges her to a deadly horse race toward an aqueduct—the first to brake loses, while continuing means certain death. Nike accepts. When Luna falters and nearly falls, Nike exhausts herself using wind magic to save her. Humbled, Luna departs amicably. In the aftermath, Nike uses Livius's given name for the first time, prompting him to kiss her.
7	"Wild waltz"	Hiroki Takagi	Seiko Takagi	May 25, 2014
Livius's estranged uncle Bard returns, charming and accomplished. At a noble banquet, Bard feigns romantic interest in Nike to test her loyalty to Livius. When Livius discovers them together in Nike's chambers, he misinterprets the situation. Enraged, he confines Nike to her quarters and vows to execute Bard for adultery through personal torture. The incident reveals Bard's true motive—evaluating Nike's suitability as Livius's future queen—though his methods nearly provoke a fatal confrontation with his nephew.
8	"Shelter From the Rain"; Transliteration: "Amayadori" (Japanese: 雨やどり)	Tomoya Tanaka	Seiko Takagi	June 1, 2014
Nike orchestrates a reconciliation between Livius and Bard, facilitating a private discussion after freeing Bard from imprisonment. Their partial resolution leads Livius to reinstate Bard as Prime Minister. However, Bard promptly resumes flirtations with Nike, reigniting tensions with Livius. The fragile peace proves temporary as their competitive dynamic resurfaces, demonstrating the ongoing complexity of their familial relationships.
9	"The Principality of Rain"; Transliteration: "Ame no kōkoku" (Japanese: 雨の公国)	Mamiko Sekiya	Shinzō Fujita	June 8, 2014
Nike receives news that her grandmother Tohara has collapsed in the Principality of Rain. After performing a subpar rain summoning for guests, she confesses the situation to Livius, who immediately arranges their travel. Upon arrival, they find Tohara merely suffered back pain. Livius meets Nike's family while Tohara and cousin Kitora conspire to prevent Nike's return. Noticing Livius's discomfort, Nike shows him their night sky and prepares rice porridge. During this intimate moment, she realizes her love for Livius and kisses him, leaving both flustered. Unbeknownst to them, Kitora observes the exchange, foreshadowing future conflict.
10	"A Righteous Country"; Transliteration: "Tadashī kuni" (Japanese: 正しい国)	Yoshinori Otaka	Shinzō Fujita	June 15, 2014
Kitora deceives Nike into imprisonment within a power-suppressing cell, revealing Tohara's plot to erase Livius's memories and retain Nike in the Principality. Anticipating the scheme, Livius—aided by Nike's sister—confronts Tohara, who discards the cell key into a lake. She declares she will only accept their union if Livius retrieves it. As Livius is overwhelmed by a wave while searching, Nike injures herself attempting to break free, proclaiming her love. Both assert life without the other would be meaningless. Their simultaneous declarations of devotion culminate in a mutual rejection of separation, framing their bond as existential.
11	"A Passing Wind"; Transliteration: "Tōrisugiru kaze" (Japanese: 通り過ぎる風)	Hikaru Satō	Shinzō Fujita	June 22, 2014
Overcome by guilt, Kitora releases Nike from confinement. Reunited with her sister—who aided Livius out of independent conviction—Nike learns he drowned during his desperate search for the key. Arriving at the lakeside, she finds him unconscious but he awakens moments later, declaring victory in Tohara's trial. Nike's sisters formally apologize for their actions as the reunited couple visits her now-recovered mother. During their public celebration in the Principality, Livius vows eternal devotion and protection. In a private conclusion, Livius permits Nike to confront Kitora alone, demonstrating respect for her agency in resolving familial conflicts.
12	"Homecoming"; Transliteration: "Kikan" (Japanese: 帰還)	Hajime Kamegaki	Shinzō Fujita	June 29, 2014
Upon returning to the Sun Kingdom with her grandmother's farewell, Nike and Livius find Bard has entertained numerous guests in their absence. The couple becomes immersed in separate administrative duties for extended periods, preventing any contact. Their prolonged isolation culminates in an emotional reunion at Livius's secret retreat, where they mutually confess their loneliness and dependence on one another. The moment concludes with a kiss, followed by a retrospective sequence of their shared memories. This denouement underscores both the burdens of royal responsibility and the enduring strength of their bond despite external pressures.
