= Anne Plichota =

French children's author (born 1968)

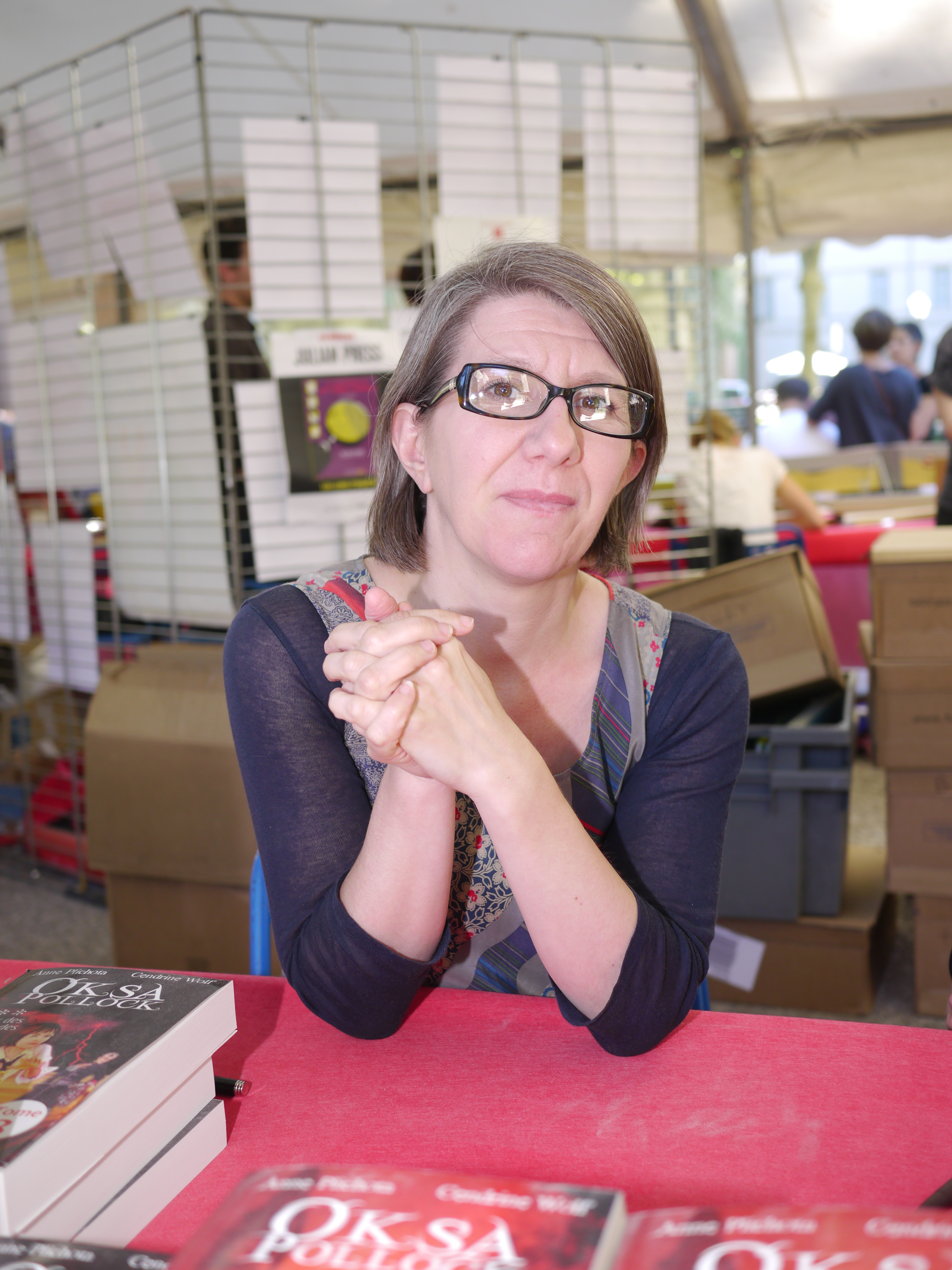
Photo of Anne Plichota

Anne Plichota (born Dijon, 1968) is a French children's author. With her fellow Strasbourg librarian Cendrine Wolf she co-authored Oksa Pollock (2007–2013), a French fantasy series, and a second more "gothic" trilogy Susan Hopper (first novel published March 2013).

The two authors were originally refused by major publishing houses so self-published the first book and distributed it locally in Strasbourg. The series acquired a teen blog following and became a local phenomenon in Alsace, then throughout France. Then in translation in Germany and Spain. The Oksa series is published in English in the UK by Pushkin Press.
