= Let's Go Kaikigumi =

Japanese manga series

- First tankōbon volume cover

レッツゴー怪奇組 (Rettsu Gō Kaikigumi)
- Genre: Comedy horror
- Manga
- Written by: Byū
- Published by: Burg Hamburg Burg (serialization); Shogakukan (volumes)
- Imprint: N.O. Comics
- Magazine: Omocoro
- Original run: July 19, 2018 – July 12, 2024
- Volumes: 6
- Anime television series
- Directed by: Yutaka Hirata
- Written by: Mutsumi Ito
- Music by: Akiyuki Tateyama
- Studio: C-Station
- Licensed by: Crunchyroll
- Original network: JNN (TBS), BS11
- Original run: July 5, 2026 – September 27, 2026
- Episodes: 12
- icon

Let's Go Kaikigumi (Japanese: レッツゴー怪奇組, Hepburn: Rettsu Gō Kaikigumi; lit. 'Let's Go Mysterious Group') is a Japanese manga series written and illustrated by Byū. It was serialized on Burg Hamburg Burg's web media Omocoro from July 2018 to July 2024, with Shogakukan publishing the series between September 2021 and July 2026. An anime television series adaptation produced by C-Station aired from July to September 2026.

== Plot ==
Mechako is the leader of the Kaikigumi, a supernatural organization that she is trying to revive. When the unnamed protagonist, a man who is easily scared, encounters her, he becomes involved in the organization as well.

== Characters ==
Protagonist (主人公, Shujinkō)
Voiced by: Tasuku Hatanaka
Mechako (メチャ子)
Voiced by: Ruriko Aoki
Shurako (シュラ子)
Voiced by: Yoshino Aoyama
Doppelganger (ドッペルゲンガー, Dopperugengā)
Voiced by: Yuki Sakakihara
Cursed Doll (呪いの人形, Noroinoningyō)
Voiced by: Mayumi Shintani
Yukinko (ゆきんこ)
Voiced by: Kana Hanazawa

== Media ==
=== Manga ===
Written by Byū, Let's Go Kaikigumi was serialized in Burg Hamburg Burg's web media Omocoro for 53 chapters between July 19, 2018, and July 12, 2024. Shogakukan compiled the chapters into six tankōbon volumes released between September 29, 2021, and July 3, 2026.

No.	Release date	ISBN
1	September 29, 2021	978-4-7780-3413-9
2	January 28, 2022	978-4-7780-3414-6
3	July 27, 2022	978-4-7780-3415-3
4	April 27, 2023	978-4-7780-3416-0
5	August 29, 2024	978-4-7780-3417-7
6	July 3, 2026	978-4-7780-3423-8

=== Anime ===
An anime television series adaptation was announced on October 11, 2025. It is produced by C-Station and directed by Yutaka Hirata, featuring scripts by Mutsumi Ito, character designs by Yoshimitsu Yamashita, and music by Akiyuki Tateyama. The series will be narrated by Shigeru Chiba. The series aired from July 5 to September 27, 2026, on TBS and its affiliates. The opening theme song is "Kimi ga Waruindakara ne" (気味が悪いんだからねっ; Cuz It's Creepy, Right?), performed by Sweet Steady, while the ending theme song is "Norowashite ne?" (呪わしてね?; Of Course, I'll Curse You, Right?), performed by Uketsu. Crunchyroll is streaming the series.

==== Episodes ====
No.	Title	Directed by	Storyboarded by	Original release date
1	"Mystery 1"; Transliteration: "Dai Ichi Kai" (Japanese: 第一怪)	Yutaka Hirata	Yutaka Hirata	July 5, 2026
2	"Mystery 2"; Transliteration: "Dai Ni Kai" (Japanese: 第二怪)	Yutaka Hirata	Yutaka Hirata	July 12, 2026
3	"Mystery 3"; Transliteration: "Dai San Kai" (Japanese: 第三怪)	Shingo Kaneko	Shingo Kaneko	July 19, 2026
4	"Mystery 4"; Transliteration: "Dai Yon Kai" (Japanese: 第四怪)	Ryōsuke Ugagami	Kagetoshi Asano	July 26, 2026
5	"Mystery 5"; Transliteration: "Dai Go Kai" (Japanese: 第五怪)	Yutaka Hirata	Yutaka Hirata	August 2, 2026 (Note: Due to the broadcast of the 2026 FIVB Men's Volleyball Nations League, this episode aired at 3:30 p.m. JST, 1 hour before the regular air time on JNN.)
6	"Mystery 6"; Transliteration: "Dai Roku Kai" (Japanese: 第六怪)	Yoshiaki Kyōgoku	Shingo Kaneko	August 9, 2026
7	"Mystery 7"; Transliteration: "Dai Nana Kai" (Japanese: 第七怪)	Ryōsuke Ugagami & Hisashi Sano	Hisashi Sano	August 16, 2026
8	"Mystery 8"; Transliteration: "Dai Hachi Kai" (Japanese: 第八怪)	Yutaka Hirata	Yutaka Hirata	August 23, 2026
9	"Mystery 9"; Transliteration: "Dai Kyū Kai" (Japanese: 第九怪)	Shingo Kaneko	Shingo Kaneko & Yutaka Hirata	August 30, 2026
10	"Mystery 10"; Transliteration: "Dai Jū Kai" (Japanese: 第十怪)	Ryōsuke Ugagami & Akari Sano	Akari Sano	September 6, 2026
11	"Mystery 11"; Transliteration: "Dai Jū-ichi Kai" (Japanese: 第十二怪)	Yutaka Hirata	Yutaka Hirata	September 13, 2026
12	"Mystery 12"; Transliteration: "Dai Jū-ni Kai" (Japanese: 第十一怪)	Yutaka Hirata	Yutaka Hirata	September 27, 2026
