= PuraOre! Pride of Orange =

Japanese mixed-media project

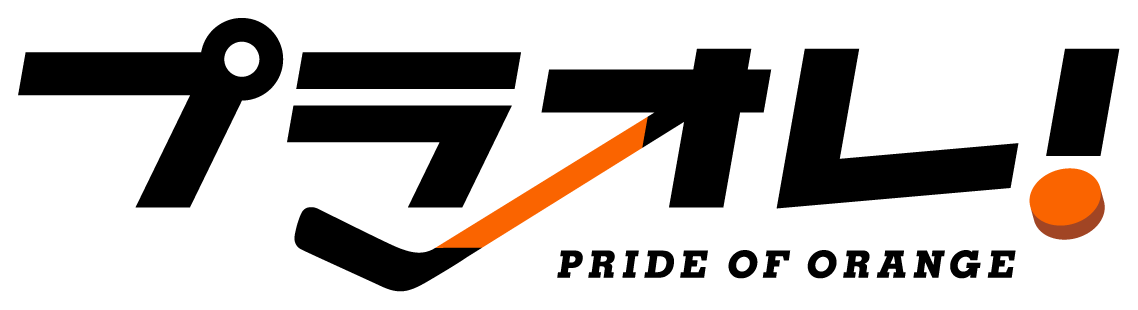
- Franchise logo

プラオレ！～PRIDE OF ORANGE～
- Genre: Sports (ice hockey)
- Anime television series
- Directed by: Takebumi Anzai
- Produced by: Takashi Murakami; Hiroshi Takita
- Written by: Touko Machida
- Music by: MONACA; Yōhei Kisara
- Studio: CAAnimation (production); C2C (animation)
- Licensed by: Crunchyroll (Note: In North America through Crunchyroll, LLC (formerly known as Funimation).): SA/SEA: Medialink
- Original network: Tokyo MX, SUN, BS-NTV, GYT, GTV, OHK, TVA, UHB, RAB, SBC, Animax
- Original run: October 6, 2021 – December 22, 2021
- Episodes: 12
- Video game

PuraOre! Smile Princess
- Developer: EXNOA
- Publisher: DMM Games
- Platform: Android, iOS, PC (DMM Game Player)
- Released: JP: March 15, 2022

PuraOre! Pride of Orange (プラオレ！～PRIDE OF ORANGE～) is a mixed-media project produced by CyberAgent and DMM Games about girls playing ice hockey. An anime television series produced by CAAnimation and C2C aired from October to December 2021, while a mobile game developed by EXNOA was released in March 2022.

== Characters ==
=== Nikkō Dream Monkeys ===
==== "Newcomer Set" ====
Manaka Mizusawa (水沢 愛佳, Mizusawa Manaka)
Voiced by: Riku Masuda (Japanese); Bryn Apprill (English)
Left wing forward for the Dream Monkeys. Her family runs an inn, and she is a member of her school's embroidery club. She becomes inspired to take up ice hockey after coming across a poster advertising it in her school.
Riko Saginuma (鷲沼 梨子, Saginuma Riko)
Voiced by: Saika Kitamori (Japanese); Kayli Mills (English)
Center for the Dream Monkeys, She initially wanted to quit playing ice hockey, but was convinced to pick up the sport again by the Dream Monkeys.
Yu Kiyose (清瀬 優, Kiyose Yū)
Voiced by: Satomi Hongo (Japanese); Ryan Bartley (English)
Right wing forward for the Dream Monkeys. She transfers to Manaka's school initially to avoid playing ice hockey at her former school, only to be lured into returning to the sport.
Ayaka Mizusawa (水沢 彩佳, Mizusawa Ayaka)
Voiced by: Mayu Sagara (Japanese); Lizzie Freeman (English)
Manaka's younger sister; left defenceman for the Dream Monkeys. She also serves as the team's mascot.
Naomi Takagi (高木 尚美, Takagi Naomi)
Voiced by: Asuka Shioiri (Japanese); Julia Gu (English)
Right defenceman for the Dream Monkeys.
Kaoruko Yanagida (柳田 薫子, Yanagida Kaoruko)
Voiced by: Yurika Moriyama (Japanese); Morgan Lauré (English)
Goaltender for the Dream Monkeys.

==== "Senior Set" ====
China Yoneyama (米山 千奈, Yoneyama China)
Voiced by: Hisako Tōjō (Japanese); Caitlyn Elizabeth (English)
Left wing forward for the Dream Monkeys.
Juri Kikuchi (菊池 樹里, Kikuchi Juri)
Voiced by: Ruriko Aoki (Japanese); SuzAnne DeCarma (English)
Center for the Dream Monkeys. Captain of the team.
Shino Ukita (浮田 志乃, Ukita Shino)
Voiced by: Aina Suzuki (Japanese); Helena Walstrom (English)
Right wing forward for the Dream Monkeys.
Runa Hirano (平野 るな, Hirano Runa)
Voiced by: Eriko Matsui (Japanese); Natalie Van Sistine (English)
Left defenceman for the Dream Monkeys.
Minato Shishiuchi (獅子内 湊, Shishiuchi Minato)
Voiced by: Shizuku Hoshinoya (Japanese); Ashely Biski (English)
Right defenceman for the Dream Monkeys.
Mona Fujishiro (藤代 もな, Fujishiro Mona)
Voiced by: Kurumi Takase (Japanese); Shara Kirby (English)
Goaltender for the Dream Monkeys.

==== "Staff" ====
Yōko Matsunaga (松永 羊子, Matsunaga Yōko)
Voiced by: Mikako Komatsu (Japanese); Corey Pettit (English)
Coach for the Dream Monkeys. She aims to combine ice hockey and idols in order to increase the sport's popularity.
Sō Satō (佐藤 想, Satō Sō)
Voiced by: Yoshiaki Hasegawa (Japanese); Stephen Fu (English)
Assistant for Yōko Matsunaga.

=== Kushiro Snow White ===
Seiko Kuga (久賀 セイコ, Kuga Seiko)
Voiced by: Aina Aiba (Japanese); Rachelle Heger (English)
Left wing forward for the Snow White.
Yuka Iihara (飯原 有香, Iihara Yuka)
Voiced by: Miku Itō (Japanese); Maddie Matsumoto (English)
Center for the Snow White.
Sachie Kaibara (貝原 さちえ, Kaibara Sachie)
Voiced by: Ayasa Goto (Japanese); Cat Protano (English)
Right wing for the Snow White.
Eri Yamanaka (山中 依里, Yamanaka Eri)
Voiced by: Suzuko Mimori (Japanese); Christie Cate (English)
Left defenceman for the Snow White.
Ema Yoshiike (吉池 えま, Yoshiike Ema)
Voiced by: Sora Tokui (Japanese); Analesa Fisher (English)
Right defenceman for the Snow White.
Rio Teruya (照屋 理央, Teruya Rio)
Voiced by: Eri Ozeki (Japanese); Christina Costello (English)
Goaltender for the Snow White.
Maya Walker (マヤウォーカー, Maya Uōkā)
Voiced by: Sumire Uesaka (Japanese); Katelyn Barr (English)
A Canadian girl who plays center for the Snow White.

=== West Tokyo Ice Rabbits ===
Mami Ono (小野 真美, Ono Mami)
Voiced by: Yoshino Aoyama (Japanese); Michelle Marie (English)
Left wing forward for the Ice Rabbits. She was a schoolmate of Manaka and the others, but transferred.

== Media ==
=== Anime ===
In December 2020, an anime television series produced by CAAnimation and animated by C2C was announced. The series was directed by Takebumi Anzai, with Touko Machida in charge of series composition, Kii Tanaka designing characters based on Craft Egg's original designs, Takashi Murakami and Hiroshi Takita served as producers, and MONACA and Yōhei Kisara composing the series' music. Funimation licensed the series outside of Asia. Medialink licensed the series in Southeast Asia, South Asia, Micronesia, and Polynesia. It aired from October 6 to December 22, 2021, on Tokyo MX and other networks. The seven main cast members, under the name "Smile Princess", performed the series' opening theme song "Fire Fight!", while May'n performed the series' ending theme song "Orange."

The English dub was released on December 30, 2022.

==== Episodes ====
No.	Title	Directed by (Note: Information is taken from the ending credits of each episode.)	Written by	Storyboarded by	Original release date (Note: Episodes were released on AbemaTV every Wednesday at 10:30 p.m. JST, 30 minutes before the original air time on Tokyo MX.)
1	"face off"	Hiroki Ikeshita	Touko Machida	Takebumi Anzai	October 6, 2021
2	"best friends"	Ayumu Uwano	Touko Machida	Takebumi Anzai	October 13, 2021
3	"all for one"	Kōji Nagatomi	Touko Machida	Takebumi Anzai	October 20, 2021
4	"grinder"	Hiroyuki Tsuchiya	Touko Machida	Takebumi Anzai	October 27, 2021
5	"shoot out"	Shunsuke Takarai	Touko Machida	Takebumi Anzai	November 3, 2021
6	"debut"	Takeshi Nishino	Touko Machida	Takebumi Anzai	November 10, 2021
7	"cheer up!"	Ayumu Uwano	Touko Machida	Takebumi Anzai	November 17, 2021
8	"accident"	Yūsuke Onoda	Touko Machida	Takebumi Anzai	November 24, 2021
9	"awakening"	Kōji Nagatomi	Touko Machida	Takebumi Anzai	December 1, 2021
10	"reunion"	Hiroyuki Tsuchiya	Touko Machida	Takebumi Anzai	December 8, 2021
11	"barn burner"	Itoko Nagai	Touko Machida	Takebumi Anzai	December 15, 2021
12	"PRIDE OF ORANGE"	Takeshi Nishino	Touko Machida	Takebumi Anzai	December 22, 2021

=== Game ===
A smartphone application game, titled PuraOre! Smile Princess (プラオレ！〜SMILE PRINCESS〜), was developed by EXNOA. It was released on March 15, 2022, for Android, iOS, and PC via DMM Game Player. The game ended service on November 30, 2022.

== Reception ==
The anime series' first episode garnered poor reviews from Anime News Network's staff during the Fall 2021 season previews. Richard Eisenbeis felt "utterly shattered" by the premiere's mixture of idol and sports anime elements through "real world logic", saying that all-girl slice-of-life fans will enjoy it more than him. Caitlin Moore was also baffled by the series' opening and found the idol angle insulting for infringing on the ice hockey segments. Nicholas Dupree commended the production values of the hockey and idol parts in the beginning, but felt the premiere stretched itself too thin by trying to appease to both genres and lacked characters for viewers to care about, saying "the overall show feels stitched together by a marketing department trying to build a money printer out of spare parts." Rebecca Silverman criticized the episode for not showcasing enough ice hockey scenes for its intended audience and found framing issues when utilizing idol elements throughout the sports segments.

Fellow ANN editor Christopher Farris reviewed the complete anime series in 2022 and gave it a B− grade. While praising the engaging story for developing its cast and showcasing ice hockey with appealing presentation, he felt the technical aspects of the sport were "incidental" and "surface-level" because of "languid pacing" and both the slice-of-life and idol elements being prioritized more than the overall narrative, concluding that: "It definitely still isn't the hockey anime a lot of people were hoping for, but it is more of a hockey anime than those initial visions of girls breaking out into dance numbers indicated, and ends up decidedly working better as a sports show than a lot of the other let-downs out there."
