= List of Dragonar Academy volumes =

Dragonar Academy is a Japanese light novel series written by Shiki Mizuchi, illustrated by Kohada Shimesaba, and published by Media Factory under the MF Bunko J imprint. The first volume was released on June 25, 2010, with a total of 20 volumes available in Japan so far. A manga adaptation by the illustrator, Ran, began serialization in Monthly Comic Alive during its June 2011 issue. The manga is licensed in North America by Seven Seas Entertainment under the title Dragonar Academy.

== Light novels ==
No.	Release date	ISBN
01	June 25, 2010	978-4-8401-3420-0
1. Prologue; 2. Chapter 1: "Eco the Dragon Girl"; 3. Chapter 2: "The Streets of Ansarivan"; 4. Chapter 3: "Necromancia's Attack"; 5. Epilogue
02	September 24, 2010	978-4-8401-3508-5
1. Prologue; 2. Chapter 1: "Silver Knight"; 3. Chapter 2: "Ironblood Valkyrie"; 4. Chapter 3: "Veronica and Silvia"; 5. Chapter 4: "Avdocha the Convicted"; 6. Epilogue
03	January 25, 2011	978-4-8401-3696-9
1. Prologue; 2. Chapter 1: "The Month of Gemini's Selective Training Camp"; 3. Chapter 2: "Rebecca's Dangerous Command"; 4. Chapter 3: "The Lakeside Vacation"; 5. Chapter 4: "The Battle at Willingham Mausoleum"; 6. Epilogue
04	April 25, 2011	978-4-8401-3895-6
1. Prologue; 2. Chapter 1: "The Knight Princess's Proposal"; 3. Chapter 2: "Fontaine City, The Knights' Capital"; 4. Chapter 3: "Oswald the Paladin"; 5. Chapter 4: "Beowulf's Conspiracy"; 6. Chapter 5: "Mordred's Tombstone"; 7. Chapter 6: "Ancient Palace's Abandoned Garden"; 8. Chapter 7: "Masquerade"; 9. Chapter 8: "Avalon's Imperial Princess"; 10. Epilogue
05	July 23, 2011	978-4-8401-3975-5
1. Prologue; 2. Chapter 1: "Tragedy of Apollo House and Mirabel's Decision"; 3. Chapter 2: "Ash's and Silvia's Study Group"; 4. Chapter 3: "Navi's Visit and the Practical skill Test"; 5. Chapter 4: "The Lost Memory at Albion Forest"; 6. Epilogue
06	October 25, 2011	978-4-8401-4271-7
1. Prologue; 2. Chapter 1; 3. Chapter 2; 4. Chapter 3; 5. Chapter 4; 6. Chapter 5; 7. Chapter 6; 8. Epilogue
07	January 25, 2012	978-4-8401-4374-5
1. Prologue; 2. Chapter 1; 3. Chapter 2; 4. Chapter 3; 5. Chapter 4; 6. Chapter 5; 7. Chapter 6; 8. Chapter 7; 9. Epilogue
08	April 25, 2012	978-4-8401-4548-0
1. Prologue; 2. Chapter 1; 3. Chapter 2; 4. Chapter 3; 5. Chapter 4; 6. Chapter 5; 7. Chapter 6; 8. Chapter 7; 9. Chapter 8; 10. Epilogue
09	July 25, 2012	978-4-8401-4645-6
1. Prologue; 2. Chapter 1; 3. Chapter 2; 4. Chapter 3; 5. Chapter 4; 6. Chapter 5; 7. Chapter 6; 8. Chapter 7; 9. Chapter 8; 10. Chapter 9; 11. Chapter 10; 12. Epilogue
10	October 25, 2012	978-4-8401-4847-4
11	January 25, 2013	978-4-8401-4960-0
1. Prologue; 2. Chapter 1: "Ash's Decision and the New Student Council System"; 3. Chapter 2: "Rebecca's Graduation Ceremony"; 4. Chapter 3: "Ash's Little Sister"; 5. Chapter 4: "Linda's Star Mark"; 6. Chapter 5: "Aries' Party Aboard a Warship"; 7. Chapter 6: "Linda's Miscalculation"; 8. Chapter 7: "The Darkness Princess and the Mechanical Dragon"; 9. Epilogue
12	April 25, 2013	978-4-8401-5157-3
13	July 25, 2013	978-4-8401-5246-4
14	November 25, 2013	978-4-04-066072-1
15	April 25, 2014	978-4-04-066377-7
16	June 25, 2014	978-4-04-066778-2
17	November 24, 2014	978-4-04-067167-3
18	March 25, 2015	978-4-04-067469-8
19	July 24, 2015	978-4-04-067715-6
20	November 25, 2015	978-4-04-067953-2

== Manga ==
No.	Original release date	Original ISBN	English release date	English ISBN
1	October 22, 2011	978-4-8401-4048-5	February 4, 2014	978-1-626920-04-0
1. "The Boy with the Dragon"; 2. "Eco, the Dragon's Daughter"; 3. "The Town of Ansullivan"; 4. "The Scarlet Empress of Ansullivan"; 5. "The Ark of the Scarlet Empress"
2	April 23, 2012	978-4-8401-4434-6	May 20, 2014	978-1-626920-16-3
6. "Attack of the Necromancia"; 7. "The Donning of the Ark"; 8. "The Silver Knight"; 9. "The Iron-Blooded Valkyrie"; 10. "Veronica and Sylvia"
3	October 23, 2012	978-4-8401-4733-0	August 5, 2017	978-1-626920-45-3
11. "Veronica and Sylvia: Part 2"; 12. "Avdocha the Executioner: Part 1"; 13. "Avdocha the Executioner: Part 2"; 14. "Avdocha the Executioner: Part 3"; 15. "After-school Monster Hunter"
4	April 23, 2013	978-4-8401-5049-1	November 18, 2014	978-1-626920-83-5
16. "The Invitational Training Camp in the Month of Gemini"; 17. "Rebecca's Dangerous Command"; 18. "Man and Dragon"; 19. "Vacation by the Lakeside"; 20. "An Unfamiliar Space"
5	July 23, 2013	978-4-0406-6531-3	February 10, 2015	978-1-626921-13-9
21. "The Battle of Willingham Mausoleum"; 22. "An Impenetrable Shield"; 23. "The Maestro that Dances In the Night Sky"; 24. "The Secret Letter"; 25. "Fontaine, the Knightdom's Capital"
6	November 22, 2013	978-4-0406-6117-9	May 5, 2015	978-1-626921-29-0
26. "The City's Evening Magic"; 27. "Conspiracy Aboard the Beowulf"; 28. "In the Palace's Abandoned Garden"; 29. "The Masquerade Ball"; 30. "The Time of Awakening"
7	March 22, 2014	978-4-0406-6504-7	August 4, 2015	978-1-626921-67-2
31. "The Time of Awakening"; 32. "The Imperial Princess of Avalon"; 33. "Steed"; 34. "Bond"; 35. "The Knight of Avalon"
8	November 22, 2014	978-4-0406-6896-3	November 10, 2015	978-1-626922-11-2
36. "Mirabelle's Arrival"; 37. "The Tragedy of the Apollo House"; 38. "Memories"; 39. "Ash and Sylvia's Study Group"; 40. "A Visitor During Exam Preparations!"
9	April 23, 2015	978-4-0406-7512-1	February 16, 2016	978-1-626922-40-2
40. "Worries and Decisions"; 41. "Ash's Memories: Part 1"; 42. "Ash's Memories: Part 2"; 43. "Ash's Memories: Part 3"; 44. "Ash's Memories: Part 4"
10	August 22, 2015	978-4-0406-7595-4	August 2, 2016	978-1-626922-70-9
45. "The Return of Rebecca Randall"; 46. "The Sonic Baron (Part 1)"; 47. "The Sonic Baron (Part 2)"; 48. "The Sonic Baron (Part 3)"; 49. "The Sonic Baron (Part 4)"
11	March 23, 2016	978-4-04-068221-1	April 18, 2017	978-1-626922-95-2
50. "Anya's Return"; 51. "The Chevron Royal Family's Key Requirement 1"; 52. "The Chevron Royal Family's Key Requirement 2"; 53. "The Chevron Royal Family's Key Requirement 3"; 54. "The Ansullivan 500-Year Festival 1"
12	June 23, 2016	978-4-04-068277-8	June 13, 2017	978-1-626925-29-8
55. "The Ansullivan 500-Year Festival 2"; 56. "The Ice Blue Princess vs. the Elfin Dancer"; 57. "The Night Àfter the Battle, The Calm Before the Storm"; 58. "Ashley's Imprisonment 1"; 59. "Ashley's Imprisonment 2"
13	December 23, 2016	978-4-04-068592-2	December 5, 2017	978-1-626925-89-2
60. "The Battle Tournament of Holy Knights 1"; 61. "The Battle Tournament of Holy Knights 2"; 62. "The Battle Tournament of Holy Knights 3"; 63. "Uranus and Pluto 1"; 64. "Uranus and Pluto 2"; 65. "Epilogue"
