= Rena Maeda =

Japanese voice actress and narrator (born 1989)

- 前田 玲奈
- Born: April 28, 1989 (age 37); Fukuoka Prefecture, Japan
- Occupations: Voice actress; narrator
- Years active: 2008–present
- Agent: Stay Luck
- Height: 163 cm (5 ft 4 in)

Rena Maeda (前田 玲奈, Maeda Rena; born April 28, 1989) is a Japanese voice actress and narrator. A former member of AIR AGENCY, she works at Stay Luck.

== Filmography ==
=== Anime ===
- AKB0048 – Gina, Candidate A
- Anpanman – Iroenbitsuman
- BAR Kiraware Yasai – Tomato
- The Beginning After the End – Alice Leywin
- Bonjour Sweet Love Patisserie – Misae Shimazu
- Campione! – Woman
- Cardfight!! Vanguard G – Female Student
- Cardfight!! Vanguard G GIRS Crisis – Shion's mother
- Concrete Revolutio – Rin
- Crayon Shin-chan – Pretty Girl A, University Student A
- Cross Ange – Hilda's younger sister
- Dropout Idol Fruit Tart – Riri Higashi
- Edens Zero – Fake Sister Ivry
- Even the Student Council Has Its Holes! as Shou Mizunoe
- Farewell, My Dear Cramer – Rui Kikuchi
- Gate Season 2: Jieitai Kano Umi nite, Kaku Tatakaeri – Announcer
- Girl Friend Beta – Misuzu Tōyama
- Hanasaku Iroha – Absent Call, Student A, B and C
- Heaven's Memo Pad – Girl A
- Helck – Hyura
- Hetalia: The Beautiful World – Italy (female)
- High School DxD – Woman
- Himouto! Umaru-chan – Child, Store employee, Teacher, Female student
- Hunter × Hunter – Machi, Reporter
- Hunter × Hunter: Phantom Rouge – Machi
- In/Spectre – Yosuzume, Yama no Ayakashi
- Invaders of the Rokujouma!? – Megumi
- Jinsei – Ayaka Nikaidō
- Kaitō Tenshi Twin Angel – Schoolgirl E
- Keijo – Hanabi Kawai
- Lagrange: The Flower of Rin-ne – Yuina Niisho, Kurumi Mamaai
- Lagrange: The Flower of Rin-ne: Kamogawa Days – Yuiha Shinjō
- Layton Mystery Tanteisha: Katori no Nazotoki File – Jennifer
- Minivan – Riviere
- Momokuri – Rio Sakaki
- Mr. Tonegawa – Saeko Nishiguchi
- My Love Story!! – Mariya Saijō, Female student 3
- Nurse Witch Komugi-chan R – Misuzu-Sensei
- Parasyte – Akiho Suzuki; Parasite, Mother Female, Voice inside Gotō
- Reborn as a Vending Machine, I Now Wander the Dungeon – Mikene
- Rinkai! – Rio Kishiwada
- Sekkō Boys – Kinue Yamashita
- Soreike! Anpanman – Yukidaruman
- Tari Tari – Matsuko Arita, Takahashi's baby
- Umamusume: Pretty Derby – Grass Wonder
- Valkyrie Drive: Mermaid – Hexe
- Waiting in the Summer – Shop Assistant, Student
- The World Is Still Beautiful – Nike Lemercier
- YU-NO: A Girl Who Chants Love at the Bound of this World – Kaori Asakura

=== Video games ===
- Action Taimanin – Lan Xiang
- Alchemy Stars – Beretta
- Granado Espada – Elisabeth
- Tokyo 7th Sisters – Mana Misonoo, Sabina Shima
- Umamusume: Pretty Derby – Grass Wonder
- White Cat Project – Pastel

=== Dubbing ===
- Forbidden Games (New Era Movies edition) – Berthe Dollé (Laurence Badie)
- Midsommar – Karin (Anna Åström)
- Spontaneous – Mara Carlyle (Katherine Langford)
