= Strange Pictures (manga) =

Japanese manga series

- First tankōbon volume cover

変な絵 (Henna E)
- Genre: Horror; Mystery
- Created by: Uketsu
- Manga
- Written by: Kikō Aiba
- Published by: Futabasha
- English publisher: NA: Titan Comics
- Imprint: Action Comics
- Magazine: Comic CMoa; Manga Action; (April 16, 2024 – July 21, 2026)
- Original run: March 15, 2024 – July 15, 2026
- Volumes: 5

Strange Pictures (変な絵, Henna E) is a Japanese manga series written and illustrated by Kikō Aiba. It is based on the novel of the same name written by Uketsu. It was serialized on NTT Solmare's Comic CMoa website from March 2024 to July 2026.

== Publication ==
Written and illustrated by Kikō Aiba, Strange Pictures was serialized on NTT Solmare's Comic CMoa website from March 15, 2024, to July 15, 2026. It was later also serialized in Futabasha's seinen manga magazine Manga Action from April 16, 2024, to July 21, 2026. Its chapters have been collected in four tankōbon volumes as of February 2026.

In October 2025, Titan Comics announced that they had licensed the series for English publication, with the first volume set to release in June 2026.

No.	Original release date	Original ISBN	English release date	English ISBN
1	October 23, 2024	978-4-575-44070-6	July 14, 2026	978-1-787-74931-3
1. "The Woman in the Wind"; 2. "The Trick Picture"; 3. "A Vision of the Future"; 4. "Fog Enveloping the Room"
2	March 19, 2025	978-4-575-44078-2	September 15, 2026	978-1-806-18505-4
5. "A Critical Mistake"; 6. "The Gray Crayon"; 7. "Drawing of Mother"; 8. "Reunion"
3	August 7, 2025	978-4-575-44094-2	December 1, 2026	978-1-806-18506-1
4	February 12, 2026	978-4-575-44109-3	—	—
5	November 26, 2026	978-4-575-44135-2	—	—

== Reception ==
The series, alongside Hanechin to Bucky no Okosama Shinryōroku, won the Men's Comic Prize at NTT Solmare's 2025 Digital Comic Awards.
