= Opus Colors =

Japanese anime television series

- Key visual
- Created by: Rin Hinata; NBCUniversal Entertainment Japan
- Anime television series
- Directed by: Shunsuke Tada
- Written by: Sayaka Harada
- Music by: Ken Arai
- Studio: C-Station
- Licensed by: Crunchyroll
- Original network: Tokyo MX, BS11
- Original run: April 7, 2023 – June 23, 2023
- Episodes: 12
- icon

Opus Colors (stylized as Opus.COLORs) is an original Japanese anime television series created by Rin Hinata, animated by C-Station and produced by NBCUniversal Entertainment Japan. It is directed by Shunsuke Tada and written by Sayaka Harada, with Asami Watanabe designing the characters, and Ken Arai composing the music. It aired from April 7 to June 23, 2023, on Tokyo MX and BS11. The opening theme song is "Shiny" by Urashimasakatasen, while the ending theme song is "New Frame" by Yuma Uchida and Ryōta Ōsaka. Crunchyroll streamed the series.

== Characters ==
Kazuya Yamanashi (月見里 和哉, Yamanashi Kazuya)
Voiced by: Yuma Uchida
Kyo Takise (多岐瀬 響, Takise Kyō)
Voiced by: Ryōta Ōsaka
Jun Tsuzuki (都築 純, Tsuzuki Jun)
Voiced by: Natsuki Hanae
Michitaka Nanba (難波 道臣, Nanba Michitaka)
Voiced by: Toshiyuki Toyonaga
Iori Haijima (灰島 伊織, Haijima Iori)
Voiced by: Yūichirō Umehara
Takumi Yura (由羅 拓海, Yura Takumi)
Voiced by: Nobunaga Shimazaki
Anju Ikaruga (斑鳩 杏寿, Ikaruga Anju)
Voiced by: Taku Yashiro
Chiharu Sakaki (榊 知陽, Sakaki Chiharu)
Voiced by: Makoto Furukawa
Kaede Mikuriya (御来屋 楓, Mikuriya Kaede)
Voiced by: Yoshiki Nakajima
Mashu Kirinoe (桐乃江 麻秀, Kirinoe Mashū)
Voiced by: Ryōta Suzuki
Yuichi Shido (織堂 優一, Shidō Yūichi)
Voiced by: Shugo Nakamura
Kohei Tose (登世 康平, Tose Kōhei)
Voiced by: Daiki Yamashita
Daiki Yura (由羅 大樹, Yura Daiki)
Voiced by: Nobuhiko Okamoto
Rio Nakashizu (中静 理央, Nakashizu Rio)
Voiced by: Katsuyuki Konishi
Makoto Yanagi (八柳 真, Yanagi Makoto)
Voiced by: Daisuke Ono
Naoki Yamanashi (月見里 直輝, Yamanashi Naoki)
Voiced by: Jun Fukuyama
Akari Yamanashi (月見里 朱莉, Yamanashi Akari)
Voiced by: Kaori Nazuka
Togo Takise (多岐瀬 統梧, Takise Tōgo)
Voiced by: Kohsuke Toriumi

== Episode list ==
No.	Title	Directed by	Written by	Storyboarded by	Original release date
1	"The Intersection of Colors #FFD900"; Transliteration: "Majiwaru, Iro to Iro #FFD900" (Japanese: 交わる、色と色 / #FFD900)	Shunsuke Tada	Sayaka Harada	Shunsuke Tada	April 7, 2023
2	"A Knot in the Red Thread of Fate #D91E10"; Transliteration: "Akai Ito no Musubime #D91E10" (Japanese: 赤い糸の結び目 / #D91E10)	Mirai Minato; Yamato Ōuchi	Sayaka Harada	Shinya Kawatsura	April 14, 2023
3	"The Colors of Day and Night That Don't Overlap #F19072"; Transliteration: "Kasanariawanai, Hidamari to Yoru no Iro #F19072" (Japanese: 重なり合わない、陽だまりと夜の色 / #F19072)	Kaoru Suzuki	Sayaka Harada	Kaoru Suzuki	April 21, 2023
4	"The Transparent Color Waiting in the Woods We're Led To #000000"; Transliteration: "Michibikareta Mori ni Matsu Tōmei #000000" (Japanese: 導かれた森に待つ透明 / #000000)	Masahiko Suzuki	Daisuke Daitō	Shingo Kaneko	April 28, 2023
5	"Gray Thunder #6E60A8"; Transliteration: "Haizora no Hekireki #6E60A8" (Japanese: 灰空の霹靂 / #6E60A8)	Kei Akazawa; Ryōsuke Ugajin	Rie Koshika	Masayuki Kurosawa	May 5, 2023
6	"Future Plans of Complementary Colors #000000"; Transliteration: "Hantaishoku no Mirai Keikaku #000000" (Japanese: 反対色の未来計画 / #000000)	Michiru Itabisashi	Sayaka Harada	Katsuyuki Kodera	May 12, 2023
7	"The Emperor Loves That Color #20AEE5"; Transliteration: "Kōtei wa, Kano Iro o Aisu #20AEE5" (Japanese: 皇帝は、かの色を愛す / #20AEE5)	Kaoru Suzuki	Sayaka Harada	Shunsuke Tada	May 19, 2023
8	"The Scene That Can Be Seen There #EAF4FC"; Transliteration: "Soko ni 'Mieru' Keshiki #EAF4FC" (Japanese: そこに"視える"景色 / #EAF4FC)	Claire Barbou des Courières	Daisuke Daitō	Masayoshi Nishida	May 26, 2023
9	"The Room Hiding in the Color of Darkness #E4007F"; Transliteration: "Yamiiro no Hisomu Heya #E4007F" (Japanese: 闇色の潜む部屋 / #E4007F)	Mirai Minato; Yamato Ōuchi	Rie Koshika	Kagetoshi Asano	June 2, 2023
10	"The Faint Distance of Orange #F36C21"; Transliteration: "Daidai ni wa Awai Kyori #F36C21" (Japanese: だいだいには淡い距離 / #F36C21)	Norihiko Nagahama	Rie Koshika	Katsuyuki Kodera	June 9, 2023
11	"The Heat Haze Clouded by Blue #C44303"; Transliteration: "Aoku Nigoru Kagerō #C44303" (Japanese: 青く濁る陽炎 / #C44303)	Takahiro Hirata	Sayaka Harada; Rie Koshika	Tarō Iwasaki	June 16, 2023
12	"Colors #FFFFFF"	Shunsuke Tada	Sayaka Harada	Shunsuke Tada, Masayuki Kurosawa	June 23, 2023
