= Mayu Sagara =

Japanese voice actress

- 相良 茉優
- Born: April 17, 1995 (age 31); Kyoto Prefecture, Japan
- Occupation: Voice actress
- Years active: 2015–present
- Height: 155 cm (5 ft 1 in)
- Musical career
- Instrument: Vocals
- Years active: 2023–present
- Label: Universal Music Japan
- Website: www.universal-music.co.jp/sagara-mayu/

Mayu Sagara (相良 茉優, Sagara Mayu; born April 17, 1995) is a Japanese voice actress from Kyoto Prefecture. She is known for her roles as Miku Kajiwara in Idol Memories, Kasumi Nakasu in Love Live! Nijigasaki High School Idol Club, Ayaka Mizusawa in PuraOre! Pride of Orange, Miruki Amauri in Waccha PriMagi!, and Luceria in A Nobody's Way Up to an Exploration Hero.

== Biography ==
Sagara was born in Kyoto Prefecture on April 17, 1995. She had an interest in anime from a young age and wanted to pursue a career as a voice actress by the time she was in her sixth year of elementary school. This desire was strengthened after watching the anime series Magical Girl Lyrical Nanoha and noticing that its lead cast members, Yukari Tamura and Nana Mizuki, performed the show's opening and ending themes. After graduating from high school she enrolled in a training school operated by the voice acting agency Pro-Fit; after completing her training, she became affiliated with the agency's subsidiary Link-Plan.

Sagara's first named voice acting role was as the character Mirai Kajiwara in the anime series Idol Memories. In 2017 she was cast as the character Kasumi Nakasu in Love Live! Nijigasaki High School Idol Club. In 2020 she voiced Moe Isurugi in Warlords of Sigrdrifa. That same year she left Link-Plan and transferred to talent agency Digital Double. In 2021 she played Ayaka Mizusawa in PuraOre! Pride of Orange.

On September 8, 2023, she made her solo singer debut under Universal Music Japan with her first album releasing on November 15, 2023.

== Filmography ==
=== Anime ===
2015

- World Break: Aria of Curse for a Holy Swordsman, Student

2016

- Idol Memories, Mirai Kajiwara

2017

- Idol Time PriPara, Chako

2019

- Hensuki, Announcer
- Kiratto Pri Chan, Yukari Daikuhara
- Demon Lord, Retry!, Manami

2020

- Love Live! Nijigasaki High School Idol Club, Kasumi Nakasu
- Warlords of Sigrdrifa, Moe Isurugi

2021

- Waccha PriMagi!, Miruki Amauri
- PuraOre! Pride of Orange, Ayaka Mizusawa

2022

- Love Live! Nijigasaki High School Idol Club 2nd Season, Kasumi Nakasu
- Teppen!!!!!!!!!!!!!!! Laughing 'til You Cry, Kana Kiyotsuru
- Aru Asa Dummy Head Mike ni Natteita Ore-kun no Jinsei, Ume Toranomon

2023

- My Life as Inukai-san's Dog, Mike Nekotani

2024

- A Nobody's Way Up to an Exploration Hero, Luceria

2025

- Catch Me at the Ballpark!, Sara
- I'm Living with an Otaku NEET Kunoichi!?, Kiraa Ventol
- There's No Freaking Way I'll be Your Lover! Unless..., Haruna Amaori

2026

- I Became a Legend After My 10 Year-Long Last Stand, Sia Wolcott

=== Video games ===
2019

- Love Live! School Idol Festival All Stars, Kasumi Nakasu
- Magia Record, Chiharu Hiroe

2020

- Higurashi No Naku Koro Ni Mei, Kazuho Kimiyoshi

2022

- Azur Lane, Z16 Friedrich Eckoldt

2026

- Nekopara: Sekai Connect, Saffron

=== Others ===
2024

- Project:;Cold, Kirara Sumida
