= Idol Memories =

Japanese anime television series

アイドルメモリーズ (Aidoru Memorīzu)
- Genre: Comedy drama, Idol, Science fiction
- Anime television series
- Directed by: Katsuya Kikuchi
- Written by: Hiroshi Oonogi
- Music by: I've Sound
- Studio: Seven Arcs Pictures
- Original network: Tokyo MX, AT-X
- English network: SEA: Animax Asia
- Original run: October 3, 2016 – December 18, 2016
- Episodes: 12

Idol Memories (アイドルメモリーズ, Aidoru Memorīzu) is a Japanese idol anime television series produced by Seven Arcs Pictures and Happy Elements. It is a "hybrid anime", where the first half of the show is a typical animation and the second half is a live-action segment featuring the anime's voice actresses.

Katsuya Kikuchi directed the anime with scripts written by Hiroshi Oonogi, and I've Sound produced the music. Idol Memories debuted on October 3, 2016, on Tokyo MX with further airings on AT-X.

== Summary ==
The series is set in the near future, where live idol music performances in virtual reality have become common across the globe. Many wannabe idols decide to join prestigious idol training academies in order to polish their skills and emerge victorious.

In this setting two idol groups, StarRing and Shadow, compete against each other in order to win the coveted 'tiara', which represents the No. 1 spot in the 'Idol League'.

== Characters ==
=== StarRing ===
Vivi Lin (林 薇薇, Rin Vivi)
Voiced by: Moe Toyota
Honest and cheerful, she can always put the other members in a good mood. She often goes to karaoke to train her singing skills.
Sena Hattori (服部 惺梛, Hattori Sena)
Voiced by: Marika Hayase
The oldest of the StarRing members and the self-appointed leader of the group. She looks like a knowledgeable older sister, but she's actually an airhead.
Kokona Hayakawa (早川 心桜, Hayakawa Kokona)
Voiced by: Yuu Kimura
A girl with idol-like adorableness. She decided to become an idol because she admired her great-grandmother, who was a stage actress.

=== Shadow ===
Miku Kajiwara (梶原 未来, Kajiwara Miku)
Voiced by: Mayu Sagara
A serious and dependable girl. Despite being the youngest member, she's the leader of Shadow. She is mature and acts that way, but sometimes has a childish side.
Yucho La (羅 雨照, Ra Yuchō)
Voiced by: Ruriko Aoki
A super-lazy girl who wants to become an idol, but lacks the motivation to work for it.
Nanami Hoshi (星 七海, Hoshi Nanami)
Voiced by: Riko Kohara
A demure girl who's easily embarrassed and shy in front of new people. She is an indoor type.

=== Kanon Private Academy ===
Shoko Shirayuki (白雪 翔子, Shirayuki Shōko)
Voiced by: Nana Mizuki
Shirayuki is the director of the Kanon Private Academy.
Soichiro Kataoka (片岡 宗一郎, Kataoka Sōichirō)
Voiced by: Kosuke Sakaki
Kataoka is the deputy director of the Kanon Private Academy.
Minato Yasukawa (安川 みなと, Yasukawa Minato)
Voiced by: Seira Ryū
Minami Yasukawa (安川 みなみ, Yasukawa Minami)
Voiced by: Ayahi Takagaki

=== Crimson Star Academy ===
Ren Hayami (速水 蓮, Hayami Ren)
Voiced by: Ryotaro Okiayu
The main antagonist of the anime series, Hayami is the director of the Crimson Star Academy.
Takumi Mori (森 拓海, Mori Takumi)
Voiced by: Takuma Nagatsuka
Hayami's lackey. He also works undercover as a Kanon Academy student to help hack the top ranking.

== Episode list ==
No.	Title	Original release date
1	"Glorious Tiara"; Transliteration: "Eikō no Tiara" (Japanese: 栄光のティアラ)	October 3, 2016
2	"Road to Idol"; Transliteration: "Aidoru e no Michi" (Japanese: アイドルへの道)	October 10, 2016
3	"Shining and Sparkling"; Transliteration: "Kagayaki to Kirameki" (Japanese: 輝きときらめき)	October 17, 2016
