= Pushkin Press =

British-based publishing house

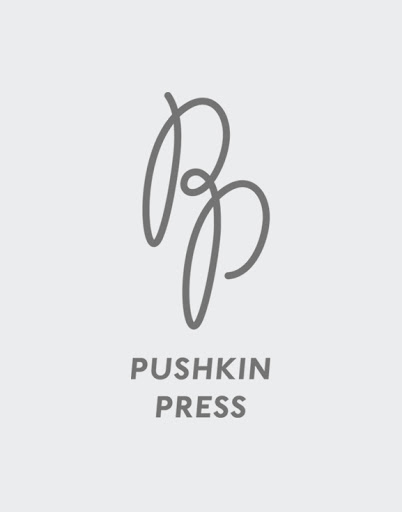
- Status: Active
- Founded: 1997; 29 years ago
- Founder: Melissa Ulfane
- Country of origin: United Kingdom
- Headquarters location: London
- Distribution: HarperCollins(UK); Penguin Random House (US and India); Allen & Unwin (Australia and New Zealand)
- Fiction genres: Literature in translation, general fiction, juvenile fiction, children's books, crime, classics, non-fiction
- Imprints: Pushkin Press, Pushkin Children’s Books, ONE, Pushkin Vertigo, Pushkin Press Classics, Steerforth Press
- Owner: Adam Freudenheim
- Official website: https://pushkinpress.com/

Pushkin Press is a London-based publishing house dedicated to publishing novels, essays, memoirs and children's books. The London-based company was founded in 1997 and is notable for publishing authors such as Stefan Zweig, Marcel Aymé, Antal Szerb, Paul Morand and Yasushi Inoue, as well as award-winning contemporary writers, including Andrés Neuman, Edith Pearlman, Ayelet Gundar-Goshen, Eka Kurniawan, Ryu Murakami, Dorthe Nors and Benjamín Labatut.

== History ==
Pushkin Press was founded in 1997 by Melissa Ulfane, whose ambition was to bring literature in translation to the UK. It is notable for rediscovering less known European classics of the twentieth century and is largely responsible for reigniting worldwide interest into authors such as Stefan Zweig and Antal Szerb.

In 2012, Pushkin Press was bought by Adam Freudenheim, then Penguin Classics Publisher, and Stephanie Seegmuller, a former Penguin senior business development manager. Seegmuller left Pushkin in March 2015.

In 2013, Pushkin Press created Pushkin Children's Books, an imprint dedicated to publishing tales for younger readers. In its first year, Pushkin Children's Books published English translations of the French children's series Oksa Pollock by Anne Plichota and Cendrine Wolf, the first of which, The Last Hope, was the company's bestselling title in 2014. Dutch Classic The Letter for the King by Tonke Dragt, translated into English by Laura Watkinson, has been the company's most successful children's book. Other children's titles in translation include Jakob Wegelius's The Murderer's Ape (translated by Peter Graves), followed by The Legend of Sally Jones and Sally Jones and the False Rose. In 2025, Pushkin launched Pushkin Children's Classics.

In Autumn 2013, Pushkin Press created ONE, an imprint focused on literary debuts that initially published one exceptional fiction or non-fiction title a season. All titles published under the ONE imprint were initially commissioned and edited by Elena Lappin. Lappin left Pushkin in 2017, but the ONE imprint continues with the focus on contemporary English-language originals.Titles published by ONE include Chigozie Obioma's The Fishermen, shortlisted for the 2015 Man Booker Prize, and Rebecca May Johnson's Small Fires: An Epic in the Kitchen

In 2014, Pushkin Press published Anthea Bell's English translation of Erich Kästner's 1949 German children's novel The Parent Trap, the basis for Disney's 1961 film adaptation of the same name starring Hayley Mills and its 1998 remake starring Lindsay Lohan. Then in 2020, Australian actress Ruby Rees recorded an unabridged narration of Bell's translation for Bolinda.Pushkin also publishes Bell's translations of Kästner's The Flying Classroom and Dot and Anton.

In September 2015, they launched Pushkin Vertigo, a foreign crime imprint, publishing crime novels translated into English from around the world, notably focusing on Japan and France. In 2024 it won the CWA Dagger for Best Crime and Mystery Publisher.The Pushkin Vertigo list includes Japanese classics such as Seishi Yokomizo's The Honjin Murders and Yukito Ayatsuji's The Decagon House Murders, and more recent translated titles such as Uketsu's Strange Pictures (2025) and Strange Houses (2025) and Strange Buildings (2026). English-language authors on the list include Callum McSorley, whose debut Squeaky Clean won the McIlvanney Prize.

In 2021, Pushkin published a new translation of Ulrich Alexander Boschwitz's rediscovered novel The Passenger, translated by Philip Boehm. It became the publisher's first Sunday Times top-ten bestseller and its first Waterstones Fiction Book of the Month, and was the first Pushkin title to sell more than 100,000 copies.

In 2024, Pushkin acquired New Hampshire–based narrative nonfiction publisher Steerforth Press and its sister company, Hanover Publisher Services. Pushkin has had a relationship with the companies since 2014, when Hanover began distributing Pushkin in the U.S. through Penguin Random House Publishers Services.In 2025, Steerforth became an imprint of Pushkin Press US, and former Little, Brown editor Ben George joined Pushkin Press US as executive editor to lead its US list.

In 2026, Pushkin Press acquired the literary estate of Stefan Zweig, strengthening its position as his principal English-language publisher.

== Awards ==
Puskpin Press was named Independent Publisher of the Year at the British Book Awards in 2022 and 2026.In 2024, Pushkin Vertigo won the CWA Dagger for Best Crime and Mystery Publisher. Books published by Pushkin Press have also won or been shortlisted for major literary prizes.

Award	Year	Result	Title	Author (translator / illustrator)
International Booker Prize	2021	Winner	At Night All Blood Is Black	David Diop (tr. Anna Moschovakis)
International Booker Prize	2021	Shortlist	When We Cease to Understand the World	Benjamín Labatut (tr. Adrian Nathan West)
International Booker Prize	2017	Shortlist	Mirror, Shoulder, Signal	Dorthe Nors (tr. Misha Hoekstra)
Nero Book Award (Children's)	2024	Winner	The Twelve	Liz Hyder (ill. Tom de Freston)
Branford Boase Award	2020	Winner	Bearmouth	Liz Hyder
Carnegie Medal	2020	Shortlist	Lampie	Annet Schaap (tr. Laura Watkinson)
Carnegie Medal	2026	Shortlist	Wildful	Kengo Kurimoto

Other Pushkin Press titles have been longlisted for the International Booker Prize, including Red Dog (2020), Pyre (2023), Undiscovered (2024) and Solenoid (2025).
