= The Strange House (manga) =

Japanese manga series

- First tankōbon volume cover

変な家 (Henna Ie)
- Genre: Horror; Mystery; Supernatural
- Created by: Uketsu
- Manga
- Written by: Kyō Ayano
- Published by: Ichijinsha
- English publisher: NA: Seven Seas Entertainment
- Imprint: HOWL Comics
- Magazine: Comic Howl
- Original run: January 25, 2023 – present
- Volumes: 7

The Strange House (変な家, Hen na Ie) is a Japanese manga series written and illustrated by Kyō Ayano. It is based on the novel Strange Houses written by Uketsu. It began serialization on Ichijinsha's Comic Howl manga website in January 2023.

== Synopsis ==
A writer specializing in occult stories receives the floor plan of an unusual house from a friend. At first glance, the building appears ordinary, but strange architectural features are revealed: a windowless room, hidden passages, and an illogical arrangement of rooms. Intrigued, the writer, along with the architect Kurihara, begins an investigation that leads them to terrifying discoveries.

== Publication ==
Written and illustrated by Kyō Ayano, The Strange House began serialization in Ichijinsha's Comic Howl manga website on January 25, 2023. The series is based on the novel Strange Houses written by Uketsu. The series' chapters have been collected into seven tankōbon volumes as of June 2026. The series is licensed in English by Seven Seas Entertainment.

No.	Original release date	Original ISBN	North American release date	North American ISBN
1	June 16, 2023	978-4-7580-2550-8	August 6, 2024	979-8-89160-611-1
Chapters 1–4
2	November 30, 2023	978-4-7580-2610-9	December 10, 2024	979-8-89160-612-8
Chapters 5–8
3	March 8, 2024	978-4-7580-2667-3	April 8, 2025	979-8-89373-180-4
Chapters 9–12
4	October 16, 2024	978-4-7580-2785-4	September 2, 2025	979-8-89373-967-1
Chapters 13–16
5	March 14, 2025	978-4-7580-2874-5	January 27, 2026	979-8-89561-724-3
Chapters 17–21
6	December 16, 2025	978-4-7580-8875-6	September 1, 2026	979-8-89765-372-0
Chapters 22–26
7	June 16, 2026	978-4-7580-9932-5	March 2, 2027	979-8-90209-059-5
Chapters 27–31

== Reception ==
The series, alongside You and I Are Polar Opposites, won the Men's Comic Prize at NTT Solmare's "Minna ga Erabu!! Denshi Comic Taishō 2024" competition in 2024.

By October 2024, the manga had over 1.8 million copies in circulation.
