= Saved by the Ice Cold Prince's Embrace =

Japanese web novel series

- First tankōbon volume cover, featuring Clarence Nartisner (left) and Katrina Sashabal (right)

身代わり令嬢を救ったのは冷酷無慈悲な氷の王子の愛でした (Migawari Reijō o Sukutta no wa Reikoku Mujihi na Kōri no Ōji no Ai Deshita)
- Genre: Romantic fantasy
- Novel series

Shiitagerarete Ita Migawari Reijō ga Noroware Ōji ni Tokeru Hodo ni Ai Sareru Made
- Written by: Hokuhoku Yakiimo
- Published by: Shōsetsuka ni Narō
- Original run: July 12, 2023 – July 28, 2023
- Manga
- Written by: Hokuhoku Yakiimo
- Illustrated by: Kusabi Kurokawa
- Published by: Funguild
- English publisher: NA: MangaPlaza
- Imprint: Spira Comics
- Magazine: Comic CMoa (Comic Spira)
- Original run: June 22, 2024 – present
- Volumes: 4
- Anime television series
- Directed by: Yūsuke Morishita
- Studio: Imagica Infos; Imageworks Studio
- Licensed by: SEA: Medialink
- Original network: tvk
- Original run: July 7, 2026 – September 22, 2026
- Episodes: 12

Saved by the Ice Cold Prince's Embrace (Japanese: 身代わり令嬢を救ったのは冷酷無慈悲な氷の王子の愛でした, Hepburn: Migawari Reijō o Sukutta no wa Reikoku Mujihi na Kōri no Ōji no Ai Deshita; lit. 'What Saved the Stand-In for the Aristocratic Daughter Was the Cold-Hearted, Cruel Ice Prince's Love'), also known as Shiitagerarete Ita Migawari Reijō ga Noroware Ōji ni Tokeru Hodo ni Ai Sareru Made (虐げられていた身代わり令嬢が呪われ王子に溶けるほどに愛されるまで), is a Japanese web novel series written by Hokuhoku Yakiimo. It was serialized online in July 2023 on the user-generated novel publishing website Shōsetsuka ni Narō. A manga adaptation with art by Kusabi Kurokawa has been serialized online via the Comic CMoa website under Funguild's Comic Spira label since June 2024 and has been collected in four tankōbon volumes. A "light anime" television series adaptation produced by Imagica Infos and Imageworks Studio aired from July to September 2026.

== Plot ==
Katrina, the illegitimate daughter of a count and a maid, grows up mistreated by her stepmother and stepsister after her mother's death. When her stepsister is ordered to travel to the northern frontier to be punished for her behavior. She is to be placed under the supervision of a prince rumored to be cruel, so Katrina is sent in her place instead.

Arriving in the remote northern territory, Katrina expects harsh treatment, but she instead discovers that the prince is quiet and emotionally distant rather than cruel, and he treats her with unexpected kindness and respect. As Katrina begins living in his northern residence, she gradually adjusts to her new life and becomes closer to the prince while learning about his past and the reason for his cold reputation.

== Characters ==
Katrina Sashabal (カトリーナ・サシャバル, Katorīna Sashabaru)
Voiced by: Miku Itō
Clarence Nartisner (クラレンス・ナルティスナ, Kurarensu Narutisuna)
Voiced by: Yōhei Azakami
Cheryl Sashebal (シャルル・サシャバル, Sharuru Sashabaru)
Voiced by: Ruriko Aoki
Countess Sashebal (サシャバル伯爵夫人, Sashabaru Hakushaku Fujin)
Voiced by: Yoko Hikasa
Nina (ニナ)
Voiced by: Kana Ichinose
Tomas (トーマス, Tōmasu)
Voiced by: Shōya Chiba

== Media ==
=== Web novel ===
Written by Hokuhoku Yakiimo, Saved by the Ice Cold Prince's Embrace was serialized as a web novel on the Shōsetsuka ni Narō website from July 12 to 28, 2023.

=== Manga ===
A manga adaptation with art by Kusabi Kurokawa began serialization on the Comic CMoa website under Funguild's Comic Spira label on June 22, 2024. Its chapters have been collected into four tankōbon volumes as of August 2026.

The manga is published in English on NTT Solmare's MangaPlaza website.

No.	Japanese release date	Japanese ISBN
1	June 17, 2025	978-4-91-061741-1
2	January 19, 2026	978-4-91-061754-1
3	May 18, 2026	978-4-91-061772-5
4	August 17, 2026	978-4-91-061787-9

=== Anime ===
A "light anime" television series adaptation was announced on April 1, 2026. The series is produced by AnimationID, animated by Imagica Infos and Imageworks Studio and directed by Yūsuke Morishita. It aired on tvk from July 7 to September 22, 2026. The ending theme song is "Tokete Kirameru" (とけて煌る; 'Melting and Shimmering'), performed by neNna. Medialink licensed the series.
