= Adam Freudenheim =

American-born publisher (born c. 1974)

Adam Freudenheim (born c. 1974) is an American-born publisher based in the United Kingdom. Since 2012 he has been the publisher and managing director of Pushkin Press, an independent London publishing house specialising in literature in translation. He was previously publisher of Penguin Classics and Penguin Modern Classics.

== Early life and education ==
Freudenheim was born in Baltimore and spent part of his youth in Washington, D.C., where as a student he worked at the Politics and Prose bookshop. He spent a year as a high-school exchange student in Germany. He studied at Harvard University, graduating with a concentration in German, and afterwards returned to Germany on a Harvard Shaw Fellowship. He subsequently took an MPhil in European literature at the University of Cambridge.

== Career ==
=== Pushkin Press ===
In 2012, Freudenheim and Stephanie Seegmuller acquired Pushkin Press, an independent publisher established in 1997 with a vision on literature in translation, including works by Stefan Zweig. Under his direction the company expanded its list beyond classics into contemporary fiction and children's books, launching imprints including Pushkin Children's Books, Pushkin Vertigo and Pushkin Press Classics. Titles he has published include the first English translation of Tonke Dragt's The Letter for the King.

Freudenheim has pursued a strategy of acquiring other independent publishers and their backlists; in 2024 Pushkin Press acquired the American publisher Steerforth Press, which became its United States imprint. In 2026 Pushkin Press was named Independent Publisher of the Year at the British Book Awards.

=== Penguin Books ===
Freudenheim began his publishing career at Granta Books and then worked at Yale University Press in London. In 2004 he joined Penguin Books, where at the age of 29 he was appointed publisher of Penguin Classics and Penguin Modern Classics. During his time at Penguin he oversaw the first English-language publication of Hans Fallada's novel Alone in Berlin (2009), translated by Michael Hofmann; the book sold around 500,000 copies across its English-language editions.

== Recognition and personal life ==
In 2025 the Jewish Literary Foundation established the Freudenheim Translation Prize, funded by his parents in his honour, for books on Jewish themes translated into English.

Freudenheim lives in London and is a member of Belsize Square Synagogue.
