= Dragonar =

Dragonar may refer to:

- Metal Armor Dragonar, a 1987 anime series with 48 episodes
- Dragonar Academy, a 2010 light novel series adapted into a 2011 manga and 2014 anime with 12 episodes
