= Oksa Pollock =

- French cover for L'Inespérée
- L'Inespérée; La forêt des égarés Le coeur des deux mondes Les liens maudits Le règne des félons La dernière étoile
- Author: Anne Plichota, Cendrine Wolf
- Country: France, Germany, United Kingdom
- Language: French, German, English, Swedish
- Genre: Children's fiction, fantasy
- Publisher: XO Editions (France), Oetinger (Germany), Pushkin Press (UK)
- Published: 2007 - current
- Media type: Print

The Oksa Pollock is a series of seven fantasy children's novels written by French authors Anne Plichota and Cendrine Wolf. Plichota and Wolf initially tried to publish the series through Éditions Gallimard in 2007, but were rejected. The authors then self-published the series until 2010, when the books were picked up by XO Editions. Of the central character of Oksa Pollock, the authors have stated that they named her after a Ukrainian aunt of Plichota's named Oksana.

The series has been published in multiple languages, including Hebrew, French, German, and English.

== Synopsis ==
The series follows Oksa Pollock, a young girl that has just moved to London with her family. She lives the life of an average thirteen-year-old girl, dreaming of being a ninja while hanging out with her best friend Gus and complaining about her unpleasant and strange maths teacher. Oksa soon discovers that she has supernatural powers as well as a strange new mark on her stomach. Her grandmother Dragomira reveals that this is because she was previously a resident and princess of the land of Edefia and had to flee for her life from the dangerous group known as the Felons. Dragomira was the Gracious (was to be the next Queen and daughter of the older Gracious Malorone), and now Oksa has inherited her powers and is the "Last Hope". As the series progresses, Oksa must team together with the "Runaways", a group of Edefians fleeing the Felons, in order to fight against their evil leader Ocious.

== Bibliography ==
1. The Last Hope (L'Inespérée) (Fr: 2007; En: 2013)
2. The Forest of Lost Souls (La forêt des égarés) (Fr: 2010; En: 2014)
3. The Heart of Two Worlds (Le coeur des deux mondes) (Fr: 2011; En: 2015)
4. Tainted Bonds (Les liens maudits) (Fr: 2012; En: 2016)
5. Le règne des félons (2012)
6. La dernière étoile (2013)
7. Promises of tomorrows (Fr: 2019; En: ????)

== Film adaptation ==
Film rights to the series were purchased by SND/M6 Group, a shareholder of Summit Entertainment.
