= Cendrine Wolf =

French writer

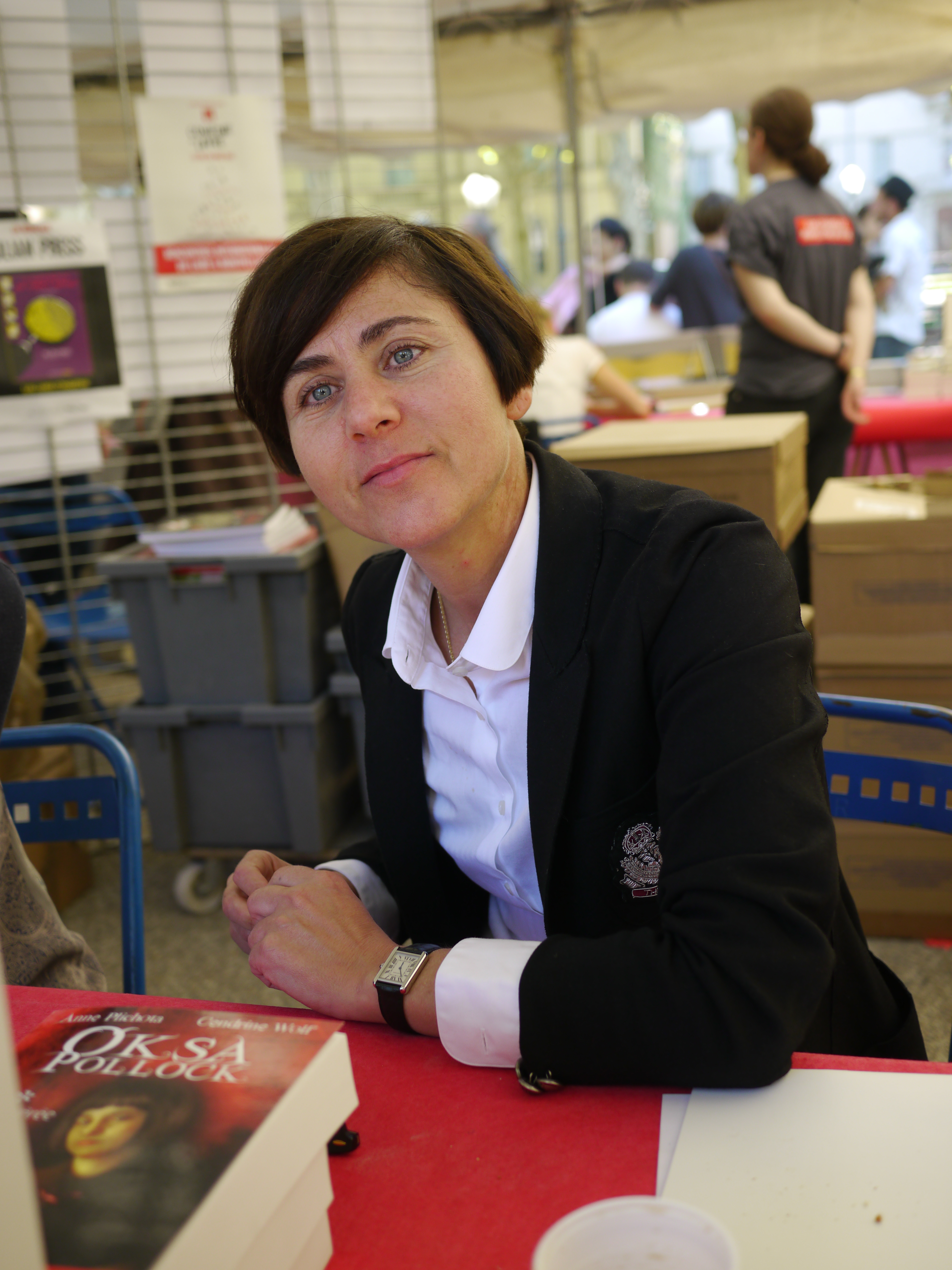
- Born: 1969 (age 56–57); Colmar
- Occupation: Author
- Writing career
- Notable work: Oksa Pollock

Cendrine Wolf (born 1969 in Colmar) is a French children's writer, known for co-writing the Oksa Pollock series with Anne Plichota. In 2012 the two announced that they would be collaborating on a new series centering on the character of Susan Hopper.

== Bibliography ==
=== Oksa Pollock ===
1. L'Inespérée (2010)
2. La forêt des égarés (2010)
3. Le coeur des deux mondes (2011)
4. Les liens maudits (2012)
5. Le règne des félons (2012)

=== Susan Hopper ===
1. Le parfum perdu (2013)
