= RoboMaster =

Annual intercollegiate robot competition

机甲大师 RoboMaster

Tournament information
- Sport: Robot competition
- Location: Shenzhen, Guangdong, China
- Established: 2015
- Administrator: RoboMaster Organizing Committee
- Host: DJI
- Venue: Shenzhen Bay Sports Center
- Participants: University students
- Website: robomaster.com

RoboMaster (Chinese: 机甲大师; pinyin: Jījiǎ Dàshī) is an annual intercollegiate robot competition held in Shenzhen, Guangdong, China. First started in 2015, it is the brainchild of DJI's founder and CEO Frank Wang, and jointly sponsored by the Communist Youth League Central Committee, the All-China Students' Federation (ACSF) and the Shenzhen City Government. It is the first shooting sport-style robotics competition in China.

RoboMaster is one of the four major robotics competitions under the China University Robot Competition (Chinese: 全国大学生机器人大赛) banner, along with Robocon, ROBOTAC and the Robot Start-ups Competition. It currently includes four sub-competitions — the RoboMaster Robotics Competition, the RoboMaster Technical Challenge, the ICRA RoboMaster AI Challenge, and the new RoboMaster Youth Tournament.

== History ==
The competition's idea began in 2013 as a small-scale internal competition held inside DJI's headquarter office with a makeshift racecourse, a chance for engineers to blow off steam while still working on technology core to the company business. It later integrated with a summer camp for university students, with only 24 participants, who were tasked to achieve autonomous moving target shooting using computer vision. In 2014, this summer camp grew to 100 students, who were challenged to improve and upgrade prior technical designs via a series of 4-on-4 robot shooting matches. This was the foundation of the later RoboMaster competition.

In 2015, Robomasters was first launched as a robotics competition. This competition introduced a confrontational 5-on-5 MOBA-style robot combat to the world for the first time, and over 3,000 university students all over Mainland China participated. In 2016, in order to improve the technical quality and competition experience, the organizing committee developed a new-generation robot referee system, and required each teams to have 6 units featuring 1 Hero, 3 Standard, 1 Base and 1 Aerial robots in their lineup in the 2nd Robomasters competition. This is also the first year Robomasters included teams from outside Mainland China, with universities from Hong Kong, Macao and Taiwan participating.

On September 29, 2017, the competition was officially renamed to RoboMaster, upgraded to 7 robots per team, and developed into a competition that demands the comprehensive skills involving all science and engineering disciplines. In addition, RoboMaster also added the Technical Challenge series, and co-hosted with the Institute of Electrical and Electronics Engineers (IEEE) the first IRCA AI Challenge in Singapore.

In 2018, the 4th RoboMaster Robotics Competition added extra technical requirements for features such as the loading and launching mechanism requirements for Sentry and Aerial robots, and focused heavily on training practical engineering personnels, attracting nearly 200 global teams. In the same year, DJI held the 2nd ICRA AI Challenge in Australia, focusing on robotics academic research.

In 2019, the RoboMaster competition sports a total prize pool of 3,750,000 RMB (US$600,000), with 500,000 RMB (US$75,000) for the winning team. In addition to the prize money, winners can achieve celebrity status among the 6 million fans who watch livestream online. According to DJI's CEO Frank Wang, RoboMaster is his passion project for engineers "to have a stage, a competition, to become loved by lots of people, to show their wisdom, show their precision", and the tournament was designed to "make superstars out of nerdy college students", and in doing so, boost interest in the field of robotic engineering. By sponsoring a popular competition, DJI can also set itself up to be the default industrial platform, as almost every major robotics program at Chinese universities now use DJI's infrastructure.

The 2020 competition was cancelled due to the COVID-19 pandemic. In 2021, while competitions were also impacted by the pandemic, some did occur across China, in addition to the first North American RoboMaster University League competition held at the Texas A&M University campus in College Station, Texas. The North American competition included 1v1 and 3v3 events. A union team of RoboX from Pennsylvania State University and Telpochcalli of Tecnológico de Monterrey was named champions of the 2021 1v1 North American competition, and ARUW from the University of Washington was champion of the 2021 3v3 North American competition.

== Competitions ==
=== RoboMaster Robotics Competition ===
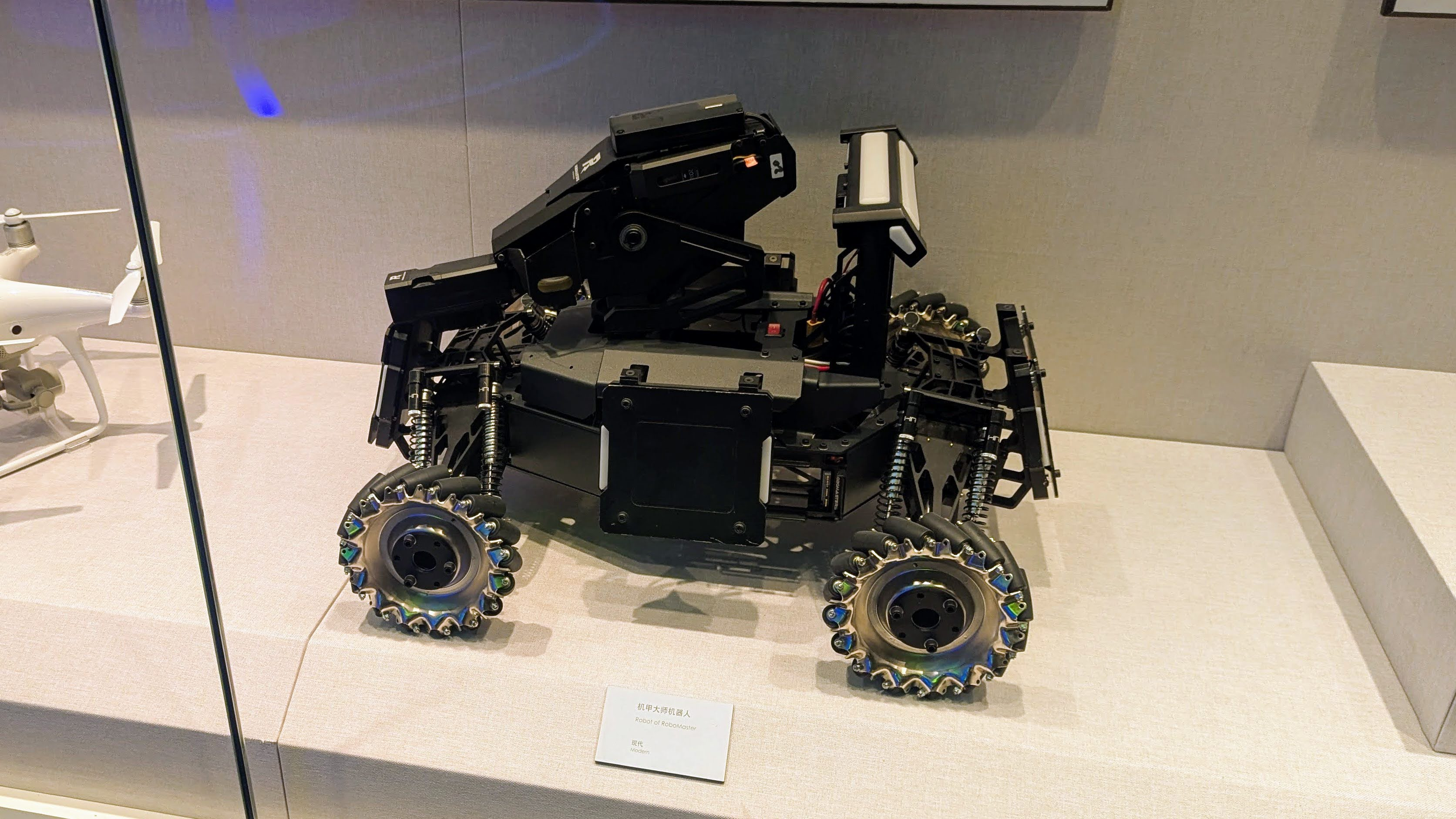
A RoboMaster robot, Nanshan Museum, Shenzhen

The RoboMaster Robotics Competition (Chinese: 机甲大师对抗赛, "RoboMaster confrontational competition"), also called the RoboMaster FPS Competition in English, is RoboMaster's main event robot combat tournament, reported to be "the world's biggest, most complex and completely over-the-top student robotics competition" by The Verge, and has attracted the interest of hundreds of colleges/universities, nearly 1,000 tech companies/organizations and tens of thousands of robotics enthusiasts around the world. Unlike the Western gladiator-style single/battle royal melee seen in Robot Wars or BattleBots, the RoboMaster battles focus primarily on ranged attacks, featuring two opposing teams (red vs. blue) of rover-like robotic UGVs (initially 5 units, increased to 7 units including a UAV in later years) engaged in co-op skirmish battles similar to a multiplayer first-person shooter (FPS) video game. The competition is held in an innovative e-sports match presentation aimed to create spectacles for the crowd and make the confrontation more intuitive and intense.

The competition is web-streamed live on its official website, and on various video streaming platforms such as Youku Sports, Tencent Video/QQLive and Bilibili, as well as on Twitch for international audiences. In 2019, augmented reality features were added to provide live streaming audience with additional information such as floating health bars for each robot, real-time mini-map and energy/ammo status for drones.

The RoboMaster matches focus on the ability to apply and practise comprehensive knowledges in science and engineering disciplines, and require the participating members to fully integrate robotics disciplines such as machine vision, embedded system, mechanical engineering, inertial navigation and human–computer interaction, etc. The participating teams are required to independently design and build robots with different tactical roles, each remotely controlled by a team member. Automated target acquisition (i.e. "aimbot") are not only allowed but rather encouraged, because the teams that can programme better and faster targeting software are simply proving themselves to be superior engineers and thus should rightfully have a technical advantage over their opponents. Only electric and pneumatic power sources (<20 MPa) are allowed for the robots, and internal combustion, explosives and hazardous chemicals are banned. Robot weight, dimensions, power output and muzzle velocities are strictly regulated to prevent competitors gaining unfair advantages by merely having access to buy better components.

Mecanum wheels is a ubiquitous feature found on all ground robots, primarily due to the gameplay need for agility and tactical flexibility. Other than the Engineer robot, every competing robot is equipped with a projectile launcher that uses two motor-driven wheels to propel 17 mm (0.67 in) or 42 mm (1.7 in) plastic balls like a squash ball machine. Each robot is also equipped with an armor system with frequency-sensitive pressure sensor plates (provided by DJI) installed on its chassis, which detect projectile impacts. Real-time impact data are Wirelessly streamed to a centralized referee system, which will register health point (HP) deduction suffered by the hit robot. A robot will become offline and deactivated ("destroyed") if its HPs are completely depleted, but can be "revived" if a friendly Engineer retrieves it back to the regeneration area at its own Base. All the robots can only carry a limited volume of projectiles within their onboard hoppers, and need to periodically go back to the Base's supply point for reloading. The heavier 42 mm projectiles will register 10 times more damage than the standard 17 mm ones, but can only be collected at an elevated "resource island" in the center of the arena (accessible only by the Engineer). To discourage weapon spamming, each projectile launched by a robot is regarded to slightly "heat up" its gun, and prolonged shooting will "overheat" and cause health damage to itself. If a robot occupies a designated defensive position on the field known as "Outpost" (Chinese: 前哨站), it will receive a cover bonus that halves the damage suffered and a "cooling" bonus that triples its recovery rate from weapon "heating". During the match, the robots that survive longer and score more effective hits can also accumulate experience points and achieve leveling-ups to further increase its combat power. The robots can also complete on-field tasks — typically by shooting a spinning electronic targets known as the Power Rune (Chinese: 能量机关) — and activate various minute-long power-ups to give its own team tactical advantages.

Accidental collision of the sensor plate with other objects will result in a slight HP deduction, but ramming is considered an illegal attack. Deliberate entanglement, restraining or obstruction of an opponent robot's movements and reloading procedures is also considered foul play, and perpetrator will be penalized. Depends on the severity of the offense, the penalty can vary from direct verbal warning by referees in the control room, the team's control interface being blacked out for 3 seconds, HP deduction, dismissal of the perpetrator, or even forfeiting the game.

The RoboMaster robots come in the following tactical types:

- Hero Robot (英雄机器人) — Heavy unit, only 1 per team (designated #1), launches 42 mm projectiles (originally golf balls, later plastic) that cause 100 HPs of damage to opponents with each hit, but relies on the Engineer to acquire and supply ammunition.
- Engineer Robot (工程机器人) — Optional support unit, only 1 per team (designated #2), has no offensive weaponry but has a large health pool and can regenerate its own HPs over time (therefore often serve as a meat shield or a blocker), can harvest 42 mm ammunitions from the resource island and deliver them to the Hero, and retrieves destroyed teammates for revival.
- Standard Robot (步兵机器人) — Light unit also known as Infantry, 2-3 per team (designated #3 to #5), launches 17 mm projectiles (originally rubber balls, later plastic) that causes 10 HPs of damage with each hit, and can complete on-field tasks that activate power-ups for the team.
- Aerial Robot (空中机器人) — Multicopter unit, only 1 per team (designated #6), can provide teammates with bird's-eye view information of the entire battlefield or shoot at enemies from the air, carries 500 rounds of 17 mm projectiles but needs to be fully charged on the Base helipad before flying in attack mode.
- Sentry Robot (哨兵机器人) — Fully automated Base defense sentry gun, only 1 per team (designated #7), moves along an elevated rail to shoot and repel invading enemies with 17 mm projectiles.

Each team's Base building (designated #8) is tetrahedron-shaped with six sensor plates — three on the top, three at the sides. It starts off with three protective shields completely concealing the side sensors, making it impervious to all direct fire attacks from ground level, and can only suffer HP damage if the top sensors are hit from above (by a drone strafing run, or a high-arching lobbing attack). The Base building is also protected by a regenerable "virtual shield", which offers 50 HPs of additional protection against short bursts of light projectile attack (until "overwhelmed" by prolonged attack, or hit by a heavy projectile) and recovers fully if receiving no attack for 10 seconds, but loses 50% defensive capability (25 HPs) once any friendly robot is lost on the field. If the Sentry robot is destroyed, the protective shields covering the side sensors are fully lowered and the "virtual shield" also disappears, and the Base becomes completely vulnerable to all projectile damage. The Base is deemed "destroyed" when its HP is reduced to zero.

When a team manages to destroy the enemy base, they capture the flag and achieves a sudden death victory. If neither team manages to destroy the enemy Base at the end of the round, the team with the highest remaining Base HP wins. If both Base HPs are the same, then the team that inflicted on the opponents higher overall HP damages wins. If the Base HPs and inflicted damages are the same, then the team with the higher overall remaining HPs wins. If everything is the same, then the match is considered a draw. In the elimination stage, where there must be a clear winner for match, an overtime tiebreaker round will be played if needed.

==== Tournament format ====
The competition takes place in two stages — the preliminary regional stage (Chinese: 分区赛) and the final stage (Chinese: 总决赛).

In the regional stage, the tournament uses a round-robin format like a soccer league, held at the campus of a nominated university in each group region. Each match consists of two 7-minute skirmish games with 3 points rewarded for winning both games, 1 point for winning just one game, or 0 points for failing to win either game (draws and losses are both regarded as "failing to win"). The university teams from Mainland China are categorized into three regional groups — "North", "Central" and "South", and the top 8 teams from each group (can change depending on the actual number of teams participating in the group that year) will automatically qualify for the next stage. The next 4 teams from each Mainland group will have to compete in a 12-team "revival stage" (Chinese: 复活赛) to produce four extra wildcard qualifiers. Teams outside Mainland China (Hong Kong, Singapore, Japan, United States, Canada, etc.) are categorized as one "International" group, and will also go round-robin to produce the 4 qualifying teams. The regional stage will produce a total of 32 playoff teams to advance to the final stage.

The final stage is held annually in the Shenzhen Bay Sports Centre as five rounds of single-elimination tournament, where a best-of-three (for the first 3 rounds, 28 matches in total) or a best-of-five format (for semifinals, third place playoff and championship match, 4 matches in total) applies.

==== Winners ====
Year	Champion	Runner-up	3rd Place	4th Place
2015	One Point Five; University of Electronic Science and Technology of China (UESTC)	TOE RM Challengers; Dalian Jiaotong University (DJU)	Flying Tigers; Southwest University of Science and Technology (SWUST)	TOE Robomasters; Dalian Jiaotong University (DJU)
2016	One Point Five S University of Electronic Science and Technology of China (UESTC)	SPR; China University of Petroleum - Beijing (CUPB)	South China Tigers; South China University of Technology (SCUT)	RobotPilotsPlus; Shenzhen University (SZU)
2017	South China Tigers; South China University of Technology (SCUT)	Smartrobot; Shandong University of Science and Technology (SDUST)	Fireline; Taiyuan Institute of Technology (TIT)	I Hiter; Harbin Institute of Technology (HIT)
2018	South China Tigers; South China University of Technology (SCUT)	T-DT; Northeastern University (NEU)	CUBOT; China University of Mining and Technology (CUMT)	I Hiter; Harbin Institute of Technology (HIT)
2019	T-DT; Northeastern University (NEU)	Jiao Dragons; Shanghai Jiao Tong University (SJTU)	One Point Five; University of Electronic Science and Technology of China (UESTC)	TOE; Dalian Jiaotong University (DJU)

=== RoboMaster Technical Challenge ===
The RoboMaster Technical Challenge (Chinese: 机甲大师单项赛, "RoboMaster single-event competition") is derived from and is held concurrently with the RoboMaster Robotics Competition, but focuses on academic research in specific fields of robotics, and aims to encourage in-depth exploration of technology, cultivate cutting-edge robotics and motivate participants to subspecialize. It tests the efficiency, quality and time consumption by the robots to complete single specified tasks required from the actual robot combat matches. Teams can choose to participate in one or more challenges such as "Hero ranged shooting", "Engineer scaling island for ammo", "Infantry speed shooting" and "Infantry confrontation".

=== ICRA AI Challenge ===
The ICRA RoboMaster AI Challenge (Chinese: 人工智能挑战赛) is organized by RoboMaster Organizing Committee in conjunction with the Institute of Electrical and Electronics Engineers (IEEE). The competition adopts the form of “autonomous robot shooting confrontation”, in a venue that full of functional booby traps. The participating teams need to use the official robot platform to conduct motion planning and control, by letting the robots independently sensing the environmental information and making decisions regarding the situations on the field, launch projectiles at their opponents. At the end of the game, the team with the highest remaining hit points win.

The competition is held in a different country every year to further expand its influence in the field of international robotics, attracting a large number of top universities and research institutions from around the world to participate. The annual robotics challenge was previously held in Singapore (2017), Brisbane (2018), Montreal (2019).

=== RoboMaster Youth Tournament ===
Following the successful 5-year run of the RoboMaster Robotics Competition, the RoboMaster Youth Tournament (Chinese: 机甲大师青少年挑战赛, "RoboMaster youth challenge competition"), a brand-new competition targeted at underage participants was launched in early 2020. A simplified form of the main Robotics Competition, the Youth Tournament involves teams of primary/secondary school students divided into two categories: Junior (age 9–15) and Senior (age 15–19). The early concept for the 2020 season include two commercial RoboMaster S1 educational robots (designed as "Standard"), one RoboMaster EP robot (designated as "Engineer") and one Ryze Tello EDU mini-drone (designated as "Aerial"). The opposing teams will engage in 4-on-4 tactical shooting battles with their self-developed/modified robots, as well as completing multiple on-field tasks such as projectile reloading by the Engineer, automated target recognition, line-tracking and power rune activation by the Standards, and breaching base armors by the Aerial. If the bases of both teams are still surviving after the end of the match, the team with the highest remaining base HP will be the winner.

The Youth Tournament focuses on building the theoretical engineering knowledge and AI application skills among STEM-talented youths, and helping them progress from grasping robotic basics and simple programming to mastering AI and robot control theory. Its competitive format is a test of the participants’ adaptability, troubleshooting and problem-solving skills, as well as the participants’ teamwork and sense of responsibility.

== Promotional product ==
=== RoboMaster S1 ===
The DJI RoboMaster S1 is an "intelligent educational robot" unveiled by DJI on June 11, 2019, as the first product from the RoboMaster series of consumer ground drone, aimed at introducing robotics to young children. Heavily promoted during the 2019 RoboMaster Robotics Competition, it has become an unofficial mascot of the competition.

The S1 (meaning "Step 1") is a chibi tank-like rover remotely controlled via Wi-Fi and app on Microsoft Windows, Apple iOS and Google Android mobile devices, with features such as spring-dampened beam axle front suspension, four omnidirectional 12-roller Mecanum wheels that allow agile strafing, a 1080p FVP camera mounted within a 2-axis gimbal turret "head", and the ability to "fight" other S1 units via either an infrared beam illuminator (which "tags" other objects like in laser tag) or a coaxial gel blaster gun (which shoots hydrogel beads with green LED illumination for tracer effects). Designed to be a mass-produced version of the Infantry robots used in the official competition, the S1 has a total of six sensor panels — four infrared/sound hybrid sensor on four sides of the chassis, and two infrared-only sensor on the lateral sides of the turret), which register hit points for match scoring.

The RoboMaster S1 has a top sped of 3.5m/s (12.6km/h) forward, 2.5 m/s (7.2km/h) backwards and 2.8 m/s (10km/h) sideways. The turret rotation speed maxes out at 600°/s and the robot weighs 3.3kgs.

Out of the box, the user has to assemble the S1 from loose parts (guided by a detailed instruction manual) and program its AI functionality to complete custom tasks. Both Scratch and Python are employed by DJI along with software modules to help the end users learning coding.

=== RoboMaster EP ===
The DJI RoboMaster EP is the second educational robot from the RoboMaster line, officially released on March 9, 2020, although it was first anonymously teased in a RoboMaster S1 commercial on YouTube dated on November 25, 2019.

The EP shares similar chassis and Mecanum wheel designs with the S1, is compatible with multi-party hardware, supports multiple software platforms and has an open SDK. The new hardwares include high-performance servos, robotic arms, grippers, infrared depths sensors, sensor transfer, modules and power transfer modules, as well as more than 50 programmable modules. The steering gear of the RoboMaster EP can be customized through a programming interface. The EP supports more than 20 third-party sensors and open-source hardware such as Micro Bit, Arduino and Raspberry Pi.

=== RoboMaster TT ===
The Robomaster TT (Tello Talent) is an educational variant of the Ryze Tello quadcopter drone released in May 2021. An improved version of the Tello EDU, the Robomaster TT can be programmed with Python, Scratch, and Swift, which can be used to manipulate the latter's new 8×8 LED display. The Robomaster TT also has a built-in ESP32 microcontroller and an infrared time-of-flight sensor.

The Robomaster TT was discontinued alongside the other Tello variants in January 2024.

== Media ==
=== Reality show ===
In 2017, DJI produced a six-episode reality television web series called 超能理工派 (pinyin: Chāonéng Lǐgōng Pài, lit. "Superpower STEM Party") in collaboration with Hunan TV. The show aired on iQiyi, Youku and Bilibili at 20:30 UTC+8 every Friday from March 23 to April 27.

The show was shot from August 13–26 in Dapeng New District, and features a science contest between a "Champions" team (consisting of members from the RoboMaster 2017 winner South China University of Technology) and an "Avengers" team (consists of RoboMaster 2017 finalists from other universities), with each episode featuring 5 rounds of technical challenges. In each round of contest, the competitors are required to decrypt messages to acquire and complete tasks, and the winners will obtain perks for the subsequent robot battle. In the first 3 rounds, the loser from the battle will have a team member eliminated, who would be substituted by a random newcomer assigned by the showrunners.

=== Anime ===
Robomasters: The Animated Series is a six-episode Chinese/Japanese co-production anime miniseries directed by Yasutaka Yamamoto (My Monster Secret, Hero Bank), Masayuki Sakoi (Ep 3) and Katsuyuki Kodera (Ep 5), produced by DJI and features animation by DandeLion Animation Studio LLC (Pingu in the City, The Girl in Twilight) and GONZO as well as score by Yoshihiro Ike. It aired on WOWOW from October 13 to November 17, 2017.

The plot follows Fang Dandan, a geeky college freshman who is determined to make his twin-tiltrotor drone KAKA the greatest robot in the world. However, on the first day he accidentally hit a girl in the head with a frisbee when testing autonomous fetch. Impressed by KAKA's design, the girl invites him to join her club — the Clear Water Bay Studio, an understaffed breakaway robotics group headed by the uptight mechatronics genius Zheng Zhun, who wanted to beat out his old varsity team for the Robomasters competition. Despite Dandan's repulsion towards Robomasters due to bad childhood memories, he finds it hard to resist the temptation...

The anime's theme song is "super nova", performed by Ken'ichirō Ōhashi, better known by the stage name KENN.

=== Documentary ===
The RoboMaster Documentary (Chinese: 《机甲大师纪录片》) is an annual documentary series, with each episode focusing on a prominent university team, and interviewing the crews about these young engineers' aspiration, introspection and personal struggle leading up to the competition that year. The first season consists of 26 episodes and debuted on April 13, 2018, exclusively on Tencent Video, with 2 new episodes released weekly. The second season consists of 23 episodes and debuted on April 17, 2019.

== See also ==
- Robocon
- RoboGames
- Robot Fighting League
- Robot Wars
- BattleBots
