= Uketsu =

Japanese YouTuber and writer

- 雨穴
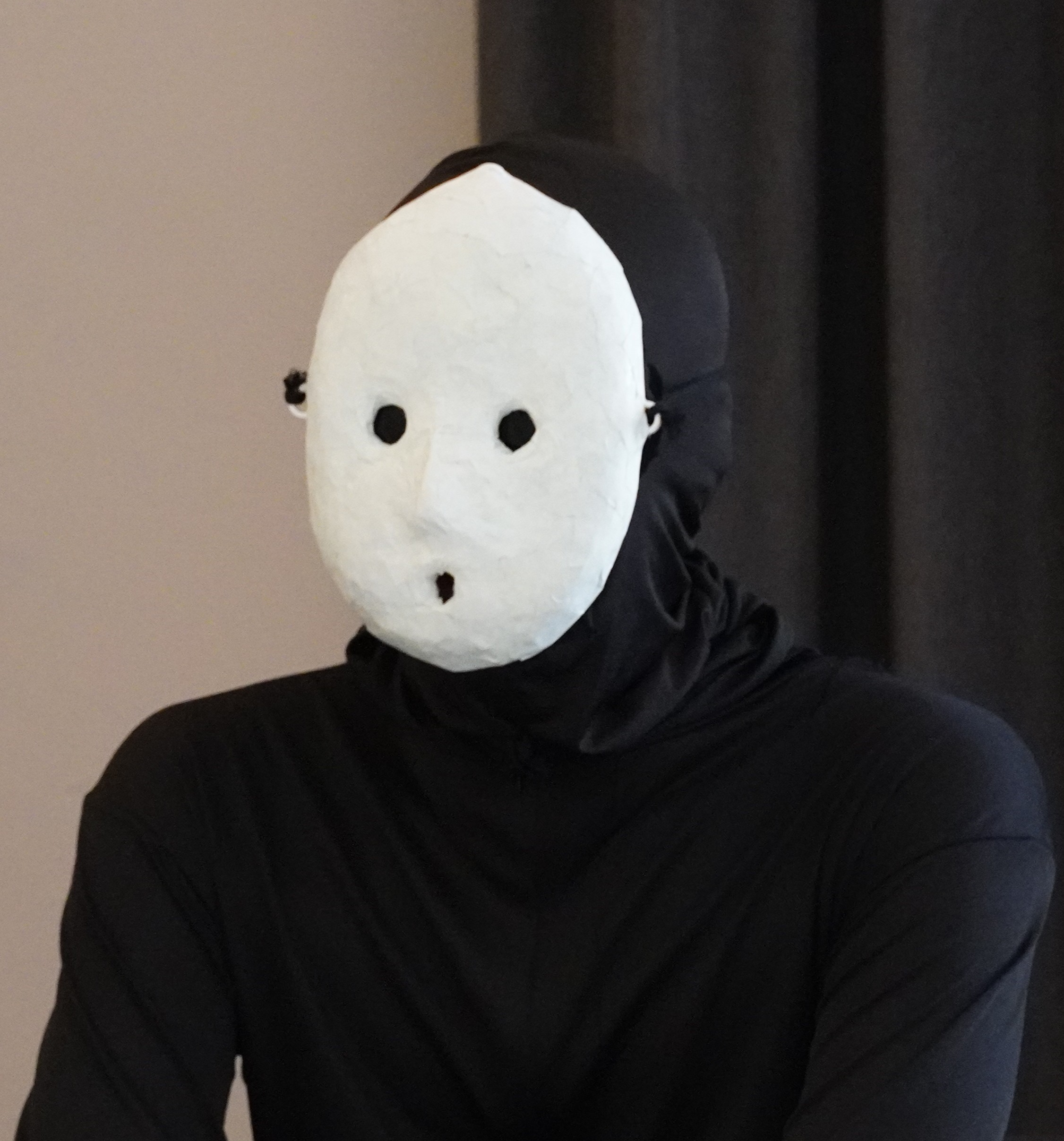
- Uketsu in 2026
- Occupations: YouTuber; writer; singer

YouTube information
- Channel: Uketsu
- Years active: 2018–present
- Genre: Surreal
- Subscribers: 2.01 million
- Views: 267 million
- Last updated: July 4, 2026
- Writing career
- Period: 2020s–present
- Genres: Horror; mystery
- Notable works: Strange Pictures; Strange Houses
- Musical career
- Origin: Japan
- Instrument: Vocals
- Years active: 2026–present
- Labels: Sony Japan; Echoes

Uketsu (Japanese: 雨穴) is a Japanese YouTuber, writer, and singer of unknown identity. He creates surreal short films and writes mystery and horror fiction.

Uketsu's novels and short stories incorporate diagrams and images as integral elements of the narrative. In 2024, three of his books were on the list of Japan's top ten fiction bestsellers.

== Career ==
Uketsu first gained notoriety through a series of unusual, often unsettling short videos posted to his YouTube channel, in which everyday objects or scenes are presented with minor distortions or surreal alterations.

In addition to uploading narrative short films, Uketsu has participated in public events and media appearances while maintaining his masked persona, including a press conference in Tokyo that was covered by both international and Japanese media.

Uketsu's fiction blends conventional prose with visual elements (drawings, diagrams, and floor plans) that are presented as clues within the text. His 2022 novel Strange Pictures sold over 1.2 million copies in Japan and 2 million copies worldwide. In France, it was named Fnac's Book of the Month, and in Germany it topped the May 2025 Krimibestenliste as the best crime novel of the month. In the UK, the novel was shortlisted for the 2026 CWA Dagger for Crime Fiction in Translation.

In July 2026, Uketsu signed an artist contract with Echoes and released his debut single "Of Course I'll Curse You, Right?" on July 5, serving as an ending theme for the 2026 anime series Let's Go Kaikigumi.

== Identity and appearance ==
Uketsu appears in public wearing a white papier-mâché mask and a black bodysuit and uses a voice changer to conceal his identity. Little is known about his life, except that he is a man, lives in Kanagawa Prefecture southwest of Tokyo, and lived in Surrey, United Kingdom, during his childhood. His parents divorced when he was young.

He has stated in an interview that he keeps rabbits as pets. He plays the guitar, the piano, and the drums. He has also stated that only around 30 people know his identity, including his family, publisher, and colleagues.

== Novels ==
Original publication		English publication	
Title	Year	Title	Year
Hen na Ie (変な家)	2021	Strange Houses	2025
Hen na E (変な絵)	2022	Strange Pictures	2025
Hen na Ie 2 (変な家2)	2023	Strange Buildings	2026
Hen na Chizu (変な地図)	2025	Strange Maps	2027

== Discography ==
=== Singles ===
List of singles, showing year released, and album name
Title	Year	Album
"Of Course I'll Curse You, Right?" (呪わしてね)	2026	Non-album single
