= Love Live! discography =

Love Live! is a Japanese multimedia project created by Hajime Yatate and Sakurako Kimino. Each of the individual titles within the franchise revolves around teenage girls who become "school idols". The first series in the franchise, titled Love Live! School Idol Project, was created in 2010 and introduced a nine-member group named μ's. (Note: pronounced Muse) Aqours, (Note: pronounced Aqua) a second nine-member group, was introduced in 2015. In 2017, a 12-member group of solo idols named Nijigasaki High School Idol Club was introduced as part of the then-upcoming game, Love Live! School Idol Festival All Stars. The fourth group, Liella!, was introduced in 2020 and has 11 members. In 2023, Hasunosora Girls' High School Idol Club, an eight-member group with yearly member lineup changes, was introduced for the mobile game Link! Like! Love Live!. They are primarily split into four subunits. The sixth group, Ikizurai Club!, was introduced in 2025 and has ten members.

The franchise's music is produced by Bandai Namco Arts under the label, Lantis. Aki Hata serves as the main lyricist for μ's and Aqours.

Some titles containing English words which are officially stylized in unusual title case are rendered below in normal title case.

== Overview ==
Group		Series	Discography	Introduced
	μ's	Love Live! School Idol Project	Love Live! School Idol Project discography	2010
	Aqours	Love Live! Sunshine!!	Love Live! Sunshine!! discography	2015
Saint Snow		Love Live! Sunshine!!	Love Live! Sunshine!! discography	2016
	Nijigasaki High School Idol Club	Love Live! Nijigasaki High School Idol Club	Love Live! Nijigasaki High School Idol Club discography	2017
	Liella!	Love Live! Superstar!!	Love Live! Superstar!! discography	2020
Sunny Passion		Love Live! Superstar!!	Love Live! Superstar!! discography	2021
	Hasunosora Girls' High School Idol Club	Link! Like! Love Live!	Link! Like! Love Live! discography	2023
TBA	Ikizurai Club!	Love Live! Bluebird	Love Live! Bluebird discography	2025

== Love Live! School Idol Project ==
μ's discography
- Cover of "Snow Halation" single, released in December 2010. The song has been cited as representative of the Love Live! franchise.
- Soundtrack albums: 3
- Compilation albums: 17
- Singles: 50
- Music videos: 7
- Solo version albums: 30
- Blu-ray Disc original CDs: 15
- Live concerts: 6

The first Love Live! group, μ's, has 50 singles. They were originally active from August 2010 until March 2016. In commemoration of the project's ninth anniversary, they later released the single "A Song for You! You? You!!" in March 2020. Seven of μ's' singles include an anime music video.

Aside from individual and duet singles, the nine idols of μ's are divided into three subunits: Printemps (Honoka, Kotori, and Hanayo), BiBi (Eli, Maki, and Nico), and Lily White (stylized in all lowercase) (Umi, Rin, and Nozomi).

=== Singles ===
Title	Artist(s)	Release date	Peak Oricon chart positions	Certifications (sales thresholds)	Notes
"Bokura no Live Kimi to no Life" (僕らのLIVE 君とのLIFE, Our Live, Life with You)	μ's	August 25, 2010	167		μ's' first single
"Snow Halation"	μ's	December 22, 2010	74		μ's' second single
"Love Marginal"	Printemps	May 25, 2011	85		Printemps' first single
"Diamond Princess no Yūutsu" (ダイヤモンドプリンセスの憂鬱, The Diamond Princess' Melancholy)	BiBi	June 22, 2011	79		BiBi's first single
"Shiranai Love*Oshiete Love" (知らないLove*教えてLove, I don't know Love*Teach me Love)	Lily White	July 27, 2011	81		Lily White's first single
"Natsuiro Egao de 1, 2, Jump!" (夏色えがおで1, 2, Jump!, Summer-colored Smile 1, 2, Jump!)	μ's	August 24, 2011	62		μ's' third single
"Mogyutto 'love' de Sekkinchū!" (もぎゅっと"love"で接近中!, A Tight Love is Approaching!)	μ's	February 15, 2012	31		μ's' fourth single
"Mermaid Festa Vol. 2 (Passionate)"	Honoka Kōsaka (Emi Nitta) and Rin Hoshizora (Riho Iida)	April 25, 2012	57		Duo singles
"Otome Shiki Ren'ai Juku" (乙女式れんあい塾, Maiden's Love Formula Lesson)	Nico Yazawa (Sora Tokui) and Nozomi Tojo (Aina Kusuda)	May 23, 2012	64		Duo singles
"Kokuhaku Biyori, desu!" (告白日和、です!, A Good Day for a Confession!)	Kotori Minami (Aya Uchida) and Hanayo Koizumi (Yurika Kubo)	June 27, 2012	43		Duo singles
"Soldier Game"	Maki Nishikino (Pile), Umi Sonoda (Suzuko Mimori) and Eli Ayase (Yoshino Nanjō)	July 25, 2012	38		Trio single
"Wonderful Rush"	μ's	September 5, 2012	30		μ's' fifth single
"Bokura wa Ima no Naka de" (僕らは今のなかで, We're all Living in this Moment)	μ's	January 23, 2013	12		Opening theme of the first season of the Love Live! School Idol Project anime
"Kitto Seishun ga Kikoeru" (きっと青春が聞こえる, You'll Surely Hear Our Youth)	μ's	February 6, 2013	8		Ending theme of the first season of the Love Live! School Idol Project anime
"Susume→Tomorrow" (ススメ→トゥモロウ, Advance→Tomorrow) / "Start:Dash!!"	Honoka Kōsaka (Emi Nitta), Kotori Minami (Aya Uchida) and Umi Sonoda (Suzuko Mimori)	February 20, 2013	11		Insert songs from the first season of the Love Live! School Idol Project anime
"Korekara no Someday" (これからのSomeday, Someday in the Future) / "Wonder Zone"	Honoka Kōsaka (Emi Nitta), Kotori Minami (Aya Uchida), Umi Sonoda (Suzuko Mimori), Rin Hoshizora (Riho Iida), Maki Nishikino (Pile), Hanayo Koizumi (Yurika Kubo) and Nico Yazawa (Sora Tokui) / μ's	March 6, 2013	7		Insert songs from the first season of the Love Live! School Idol Project anime
"No Brand Girls" / "Start:Dash!!"	μ's	April 3, 2013	5		Insert songs from the first season of the Love Live! School Idol Project anime
"Binetsu kara Mystery" (微熱からMystery, Mystery from Slight Fever)	Lily White	June 26, 2013	4		Lily White's second single
"Cutie Panther"	BiBi	July 24, 2013	8		BiBi's second single
"Pure Girls Project"	Printemps	August 21, 2013	10		Printemps' second single
"Music S.T.A.R.T!!"	μ's	November 27, 2013	5		μ's' sixth single
"Takaramonozu" (タカラモノズ, Treasures) / "Paradise Live"	μ's	January 29, 2014	4	JP: Gold	Special single to celebrate 1 million downloads of Love Live! School Idol Festival in Japan
"Endless Parade"	μ's	February 3, 2014	—		Special single released alongside the tickets sales for μ's→Next LoveLive! 2014: Endless Parade
"It's Our Miraculous Time" (Note: Official English title from Love Live! School Idol Festival video game series.) (それは僕たちの奇跡, Sore wa Bokutachi no Kiseki; lit. "That's Our Miracle")	μ's	April 23, 2014	3	JP: Gold	Opening theme of the second season of the Love Live! School Idol Project anime
"Donna Toki mo Zutto" (どんなときもずっと, Always No Matter What)	μ's	May 8, 2014	2		Ending theme of the second season of the Love Live! School Idol Project anime
"Yume no Tobira" (ユメノトビラ, The Door of Dreams)	μ's	May 28, 2014	3		Insert songs from the second season of the Love Live! School Idol Project anime
"Love Wing Bell" / "Dancing Stars on Me!"	Rin Hoshizora (Riho Iida), Maki Nishikino (Pile), Hanayo Koizumi (Yurika Kubo), Eli Ayase (Yoshino Nanjō), Nozomi Tojo (Aina Kusuda) and Nico Yazawa (Sora Tokui) / μ's	June 11, 2014	3		Insert songs from the second season of the Love Live! School Idol Project anime
"KiRa-KiRa Sensation!" / "Happy Maker!"	μ's	July 9, 2014	3		Insert songs from the second season of the Love Live! School Idol Project anime
"Shangri-La Shower"	μ's	October 1, 2014	5		Love Live! School Idol Paradise exclusive song
"Eien Friends" (永遠フレンズ, Forever Friends)	Printemps	November 12, 2014	6		Printemps' third single, in collaboration with Love Live! School Idol Festival as celebration for reaching 3 million downloads in Japan
"Aki no Anata no Sora Tōku" (秋のあなたの空遠く, Your Distant Autumn Sky)	Lily White	November 26, 2014	3		Lily White's third single, in collaboration with Love Live! School Idol Festival as celebration for reaching 3 million downloads in Japan
"Fuyu ga Kureta Yokan" (冬がくれた予感, The Premonition that Winter Gave Me)	BiBi	December 24, 2014	2	JP: Gold	BiBi's third single, in collaboration with Love Live! School Idol Festival as celebration for reaching 3 million downloads in Japan
"CheerDay CheerGirl!"	Printemps	December 25, 2014	—		Released as bonus CDs for those who bought the Love Live! season 2 Blu-ray Discs from Gamers, Animate, and Softmap, respectively
"Onaji Hoshi ga Mitai" (同じ星が見たい, I Want To See the Same Stars)	Lily White	December 25, 2014	—		Released as bonus CDs for those who bought the Love Live! season 2 Blu-ray Discs from Gamers, Animate, and Softmap, respectively
"Silent Tonight"	BiBi	December 25, 2014	—		Released as bonus CDs for those who bought the Love Live! season 2 Blu-ray Discs from Gamers, Animate, and Softmap, respectively
"Dreamin' Go! Go!!"	μ's	January 15, 2015	—		Special single released alongside the tickets sales for μ's Go→Go! LoveLive! 2015: Dream Sensation!
"Mi wa μ'sic no Mi" (ミはμ'sicのミ, M is for mu'sic; M is for μ'sic)	μ's	April 22, 2015	5		Collaboration single with Dengeki G's Magazine
"Saitei de Saikō no Paradiso" (最低で最高のParadiso, The Best and Worst Paradiso)	BiBi	May 23, 2015	—		Lottery prize during Love Live! The School Idol Movie
"Otohime Heart de Love Kyūden" (乙姫心で恋宮殿, A Palace of Love in the Young Princess' Heart)	Lily White	May 23, 2015	—		Lottery prize during Love Live! The School Idol Movie
"Museum de Dō Shitai" (MUSEUMでどうしたい, What Would You Like to Do At the Museum?)	Printemps	May 23, 2015	—		Lottery prize during Love Live! The School Idol Movie
"Angelic Angel" / "Hello, Hoshi o Kazoete" (Hello,星を数えて, Hello, Count the Stars)	μ's / Maki Nishikino (Pile), Hanayo Koizumi (Yurika Kubo) and Rin Hoshizora (Riho Iida)	July 1, 2015	2		Songs from Love Live! The School Idol Movie
"Sunny Day Song" / "?←Heartbeat" (Hate na Heartbeat)	μ's / Nico Yazawa (Sora Tokui), Eli Ayase (Yoshino Nanjō) and Nozomi Tojo (Aina Kusuda)	July 8, 2015	2		Songs from Love Live! The School Idol Movie
"Bokutachi wa Hitotsu no Hikari" (僕たちはひとつの光, We Are a Single Light) / "Future Style"	μ's / Honoka Kousaka (Emi Nitta), Umi Sonada (Suzuko Mimori) and Kotori Minami (Aya Uchida)	July 15, 2015	2		Songs from Love Live! The School Idol Movie
"Heart to Heart!"	μ's	October 28, 2015	3		Special songs for Love Live! School Idol Festival
"Wao-Wao Powerful Day!"	Printemps	November 25, 2015	3		Special songs for Love Live! School Idol Festival
"Omoide Ijō ni Naritakute" (思い出以上になりたくて, I Want It to Be More Than Just a Memory)	Lily White	December 23, 2015	3		Special songs for Love Live! School Idol Festival
"Sakkaku Crossroads" (錯覚CROSSROADS, Illusionary Crossroads)	BiBi	January 20, 2016	2	JP: Gold	Special songs for Love Live! School Idol Festival
"Moment Ring"	μ's	March 2, 2016	2	JP: Gold	This single was considered to be μ's' "final" single before their hiatus
"A Song for You! You? You!!"	μ's	March 25, 2020	2		μ's single with a music video for Love Live!'s ninth anniversary. Also the first single after a four-year hiatus since "Moment Ring" was released.
"—" denotes releases that were ineligible to chart.

=== Original song CDs ===
BD volume	Title	Artist	Release date
Season 1
1	"Yume Naki Yume wa Yume janai" (夢なき夢は夢じゃない, A Dream Without a Dream is Not a Dream)	Honoka Kōsaka (Emi Nitta)	March 22, 2013
2	"Anemone Heart"	Kotori Minami (Aya Uchida) and Umi Sonoda (Suzuko Mimori)	April 24, 2013
3	"Nawatobi" (なわとび, Jumping Rope)	Hanayo Koizumi (Yurika Kubo)	May 28, 2013
4	"Beat in Angel"	Rin Hoshizora (Riho Iida) and Maki Nishikino (Pile)	June 21, 2013
5	"Nico Puri Joshi Dō" (にこぷり♡女子道, Nico Puri Girl's Path)	Nico Yazawa (Sora Tokui)	July 26, 2013
6	"Glass no Hanazono" (硝子の花園, Garden of Glass)	Eli Ayase (Yoshino Nanjō) and Nozomi Tojo (Aina Kusuda)	August 28, 2013
7	"Loneliest Baby"	μ's	September 25, 2013
Season 2
1	"Shiawase Iki no Smiling!" (シアワセ行きのSMILING!, The Smiling Towards Happiness!)	Honoka Kōsaka (Emi Nitta)	June 20, 2014
2	"Zurui yo Magnetic Today" (ずるいよMagnetic today, That Unfair Magnetic Today)	Maki Nishikino (Pile) and Nico Yazawa (Sora Tokui)	July 25, 2014
3	"Kururin Miracle" (くるりんMIRACLE, Twirling Miracle)	Rin Hoshizora (Riho Iida)	August 27, 2014
4	"Storm in Lover"	Eli Ayase (Yoshino Nanjō) and Umi Sonoda (Suzuko Mimori)	September 24, 2014
5	"Moshimo kara Kitto" (もしもからきっと, From If To I'm Sure)	Nozomi Tojo (Aina Kusuda)	October 29, 2014
6	"Suki desu ga Suki desu ka?" (好きですが好きですか？, I Love You, but Do You Love Me?)	Kotori Minami (Aya Uchida) and Hanayo Koizumi (Yurika Kubo)	November 21, 2014
7	"Soshite Saigo no Page niwa" (そして最後のページには, And On the Last Page is)	μ's	December 25, 2014
Film
	"Korekara" (これから, From Here Onwards)	μ's	December 15, 2015

=== Albums ===
Title	Artist(s)	Release date	Peak Oricon chart positions	Certifications	Notes
Umiiro Shōjo ni Miserarete (海色少女に魅せられて, The Enchanted Ocean-colored Maiden)	Umi Sonoda (Suzuko Mimori)	November 23, 2011	97		Umi Sonoda's first solo album
Kotori Lovin' You (ことりLovin' you)	Kotori Minami (Aya Uchida)	December 14, 2011	109		Kotori Minami's first solo album
Honnori Honokairo! (ほんのり穂乃果色!, Faint Honoka Color)	Honoka Kōsaka (Emi Nitta)	January 25, 2012	90		Honoka Kōsaka's first solo album
μ's Best Album Best Live! Collection	μ's	January 9, 2013	12	JP: Gold	Singles compilation from the franchise from August 2010 to October 2012
Notes of School Idol Days	μ's, A-Rise, & Yoshiaki Fujisawa	April 10, 2013	10		Soundtrack from the first season of the Love Live! School Idol Project anime
Orange Cheers!	Honoka Kōsaka (Emi Nitta)	April 2, 2014	44		Separated albums from Solo Live! collection Memorial Box II
Ice Blue no Shunkan (アイス・ブルーの瞬間)	Eli Ayase (Yoshino Nanjō)	April 2, 2014	28		Separated albums from Solo Live! collection Memorial Box II
Junpaku Romance (純白ロマンス)	Kotori Minami (Aya Uchida)	April 2, 2014	37		Separated albums from Solo Live! collection Memorial Box II
Ao no Shinwa (蒼の神話)	Umi Sonoda (Suzuko Mimori)	April 2, 2014	41		Separated albums from Solo Live! collection Memorial Box II
Ring a Yellow Bell	Rin Hoshizora (Riho Iida)	April 2, 2014	53		Separated albums from Solo Live! collection Memorial Box II
Scarlet Princess	Maki Nishikino (Pile)	April 2, 2014	31		Separated albums from Solo Live! collection Memorial Box II
Violet Moon (バイオレットムーン)	Nozomi Tojo (Aina Kusuda)	April 2, 2014	59		Separated albums from Solo Live! collection Memorial Box II
Wakakusa no Season (若草のSeason)	Hanayo Koizumi (Yurika Kubo)	April 2, 2014	52		Separated albums from Solo Live! collection Memorial Box II
Momoiro Egao (ももいろ♡えがお)	Nico Yazawa (Sora Tokui)	April 2, 2014	47		Separated albums from Solo Live! collection Memorial Box II
Solo Live! Collection Memorial Box II	μ's	April 2, 2014	8		Second solo album box set
Notes of School Idol Days: Glory	μ's, A-Rise, & Yoshiaki Fujisawa	August 27, 2014	7		Soundtrack from the second season of the Love Live! School Idol Project anime
Love Live! 1st Season Compilation Album	μ's	April 28, 2015	—		Compilation of songs from its respective season of Love Live! School Idol Project
Love Live! 2nd Season Compilation Album	μ's	April 28, 2015	—		Compilation of songs from its respective season of Love Live! School Idol Project
μ's Best Album Best Live! Collection II	μ's	May 27, 2015	1	JP: Gold	Singles compilation from the franchise from January 2013 to December 2014
Notes of School Idol Days: Curtain Call	μ's, Takayama Minami, & Yoshiaki Fujisawa	August 5, 2015	4		Soundtrack from Love Live! The School Idol Movie
Memories with Honoka	Honoka Kōsaka (Emi Nitta)	March 28, 2018	56		Separated albums from Solo Live! collection Memorial Box III
Memories with Eli	Eli Ayase (Yoshino Nanjō)	March 28, 2018	36		Separated albums from Solo Live! collection Memorial Box III
Memories with Kotori	Kotori Minami (Aya Uchida)	March 28, 2018	42		Separated albums from Solo Live! collection Memorial Box III
Memories with Umi	Umi Sonoda (Suzuko Mimori)	March 28, 2018	44		Separated albums from Solo Live! collection Memorial Box III
Memories with Rin	Rin Hoshizora (Riho Iida)	March 28, 2018	54		Separated albums from Solo Live! collection Memorial Box III
Memories with Maki	Maki Nishikino (Pile)	March 28, 2018	43		Separated albums from Solo Live! collection Memorial Box III
Memories with Nozomi	Nozomi Tojo (Aina Kusuda)	March 28, 2018	58		Separated albums from Solo Live! collection Memorial Box III
Memories with Hanayo	Hanayo Koizumi (Yurika Kubo)	March 28, 2018	50		Separated albums from Solo Live! collection Memorial Box III
Memories with Nico	Nico Yazawa (Sora Tokui)	March 28, 2018	55		Separated albums from Solo Live! collection Memorial Box III
Solo Live! Collection Memorial Box III	μ's	March 28, 2018	11		Third solo album box set
μ's Complete Best Box Chapter 01	μ's	December 25, 2019			Separated albums (as "Chapters") from μ's Memorial CD-Box "Complete Best Box" for digital releases
μ's Complete Best Box Chapter 02	μ's	December 25, 2019			Separated albums (as "Chapters") from μ's Memorial CD-Box "Complete Best Box" for digital releases
μ's Complete Best Box Chapter 03	μ's	December 25, 2019			Separated albums (as "Chapters") from μ's Memorial CD-Box "Complete Best Box" for digital releases
μ's Complete Best Box Chapter 04	μ's	December 25, 2019			Separated albums (as "Chapters") from μ's Memorial CD-Box "Complete Best Box" for digital releases
μ's Complete Best Box Chapter 05	μ's	December 25, 2019			Separated albums (as "Chapters") from μ's Memorial CD-Box "Complete Best Box" for digital releases
μ's Complete Best Box Chapter 06	μ's	December 25, 2019			Separated albums (as "Chapters") from μ's Memorial CD-Box "Complete Best Box" for digital releases
μ's Complete Best Box Chapter 07	Printemps	December 25, 2019			Separated albums (as "Chapters") from μ's Memorial CD-Box "Complete Best Box" for digital releases
μ's Complete Best Box Chapter 08	BiBi	December 25, 2019			Separated albums (as "Chapters") from μ's Memorial CD-Box "Complete Best Box" for digital releases
μ's Complete Best Box Chapter 09	Lily White	December 25, 2019			Separated albums (as "Chapters") from μ's Memorial CD-Box "Complete Best Box" for digital releases
μ's Complete Best Box Chapter 10	μ's	December 25, 2019			Separated albums (as "Chapters") from μ's Memorial CD-Box "Complete Best Box" for digital releases
μ's Complete Best Box Chapter 11	μ's	December 25, 2019			Separated albums (as "Chapters") from μ's Memorial CD-Box "Complete Best Box" for digital releases
μ's Complete Best Box Chapter 12	μ's	December 25, 2019			Separated albums (as "Chapters") from μ's Memorial CD-Box "Complete Best Box" for digital releases
μ's Memorial CD-Box "Complete Best Box"	μ's, Printemps, BiBi, & Lily White	December 25, 2019	11		CD collection of all μ's' songs up to "Moment Ring" single. Was available for a limited time between December 25, 2019, and March 31, 2021, as part of Love Live!'s ninth anniversary.
Honoka Kōsaka Extra (高坂穂乃果 Extra)	Honoka Kōsaka (Emi Nitta)	October 25, 2019 (with Blu-ray Box Forever Edition) September 9, 2020 (digital streaming)			Solo albums for Blu-ray Disc original CD songs. These albums are originally included with Love Live! 9th Anniversary Blu-ray Box Forever Edition, later released as separate albums for digital streaming services.
Eli Ayase Extra (絢瀬絵里 Extra)	Eli Ayase (Yoshino Nanjō)	October 25, 2019 (with Blu-ray Box Forever Edition) September 9, 2020 (digital streaming)			Solo albums for Blu-ray Disc original CD songs. These albums are originally included with Love Live! 9th Anniversary Blu-ray Box Forever Edition, later released as separate albums for digital streaming services.
Kotori Minami Extra (南ことり Extra)	Kotori Minami (Aya Uchida)	October 25, 2019 (with Blu-ray Box Forever Edition) September 9, 2020 (digital streaming)			Solo albums for Blu-ray Disc original CD songs. These albums are originally included with Love Live! 9th Anniversary Blu-ray Box Forever Edition, later released as separate albums for digital streaming services.
Umi Sonoda Extra (園田海未 Extra)	Umi Sonoda (Suzuko Mimori)	October 25, 2019 (with Blu-ray Box Forever Edition) September 9, 2020 (digital streaming)			Solo albums for Blu-ray Disc original CD songs. These albums are originally included with Love Live! 9th Anniversary Blu-ray Box Forever Edition, later released as separate albums for digital streaming services.
Rin Hoshizora Extra (星空 凛 Extra)	Rin Hoshizora (Riho Iida)	October 25, 2019 (with Blu-ray Box Forever Edition) September 9, 2020 (digital streaming)			Solo albums for Blu-ray Disc original CD songs. These albums are originally included with Love Live! 9th Anniversary Blu-ray Box Forever Edition, later released as separate albums for digital streaming services.
Maki Nishikino Extra (西木野真姫 Extra)	Maki Nishikino (Pile)	October 25, 2019 (with Blu-ray Box Forever Edition) September 9, 2020 (digital streaming)			Solo albums for Blu-ray Disc original CD songs. These albums are originally included with Love Live! 9th Anniversary Blu-ray Box Forever Edition, later released as separate albums for digital streaming services.
Nozomi Tojō Extra (東條 希 Extra)	Nozomi Tojo (Aina Kusuda)	October 25, 2019 (with Blu-ray Box Forever Edition) September 9, 2020 (digital streaming)			Solo albums for Blu-ray Disc original CD songs. These albums are originally included with Love Live! 9th Anniversary Blu-ray Box Forever Edition, later released as separate albums for digital streaming services.
Hanayo Koizumi Extra (小泉花陽 Extra)	Hanayo Koizumi (Yurika Kubo)	October 25, 2019 (with Blu-ray Box Forever Edition) September 9, 2020 (digital streaming)			Solo albums for Blu-ray Disc original CD songs. These albums are originally included with Love Live! 9th Anniversary Blu-ray Box Forever Edition, later released as separate albums for digital streaming services.
Nico Yazawa Extra (矢澤にこ Extra)	Nico Yazawa (Sora Tokui)	October 25, 2019 (with Blu-ray Box Forever Edition) September 9, 2020 (digital streaming)			Solo albums for Blu-ray Disc original CD songs. These albums are originally included with Love Live! 9th Anniversary Blu-ray Box Forever Edition, later released as separate albums for digital streaming services.
"—" denotes releases that were ineligible to chart.

=== Live concerts and video albums ===
Title	Artist(s)	Concert date(s)	Video release date(s)	Format	Peak Oricon chart positions	Notes
μ's First Love Live! (Note: Held at Yokohama Blitz)	μ's	February 19, 2012	November 21, 2012	BD/DVD	206 (DVD); 28 (BD)	Concerts
μ's New Year LoveLive! 2013 (Note: Held at Tokyo Dome City Hall)	μ's	January 3, 2013	April 24, 2013 (Part 1); June 21, 2013 (Part 2); August 28, 2013 (Part 3)	BD	—	Concerts
μ's 3rd Anniversary LoveLive! (Note: Held at Pacifico Yokohama National Convention Hall)	μ's	June 16, 2013	December 25, 2013	BD/DVD	49 (DVD); 3 (BD)	Concerts
μ's→Next LoveLive! 2014: Endless Parade (Note: Held at Saitama Super Arena)	μ's	February 8–9, 2014	July 23, 2014 (Day 2); July 25, 2014 (Day 1, Part 1); September 24, 2014 (Day 1, Part 2); November 21, 2014 (Day 1, Part 3)	BD (for both days) / DVD (for Day 2 only)	7 (DVD); 6 (BD) (Day 2 Only)	Concerts
μ's Go→Go! LoveLive! 2015: Dream Sensation!	μ's	January 31 & February 1, 2015	September 30, 2015	BD/DVD	10 (DVD Day 1); 11 (DVD Day 2); 61 (BD Day 1); 59 (BD Day 2); 1 (BD Memorial Box)	Concerts
μ's Final LoveLive! μ'sic Forever (Note: Held at Tokyo Dome)	μ's	March 31 & April 1, 2016	September 28, 2016	BD/DVD	5 (DVD Day 1); 3 (DVD Day 2); 55 (BD Day 1); 22 (BD Day 2); 1 (BD Memorial Box)	This concert was considered to be μ's' "final" concert before their hiatus
Love Live! μ's Live Collection	μ's	—	August 26, 2016	BD	3	Collection of all music videos and animated sequences throughout the series and film

=== Radio CDs ===
Title	Artist(s)	Release date	Peak Oricon chart positions	Notes
Love Live Radio Kagai Katsudō Nicorinpana Theme Song DJCD (ラブライ部 ラジオ課外活動 にこりんぱな テーマソングDJCD)	Nico Yazawa (Sora Tokui), Rin Hoshizora (Riho Iida) and Hanayo Koizumi (Yurika Kubo)	October 17, 2012	73	Theme song from the Love Live! μ's Public Relations Department: NicoRinPana radio program

== Love Live! Sunshine!! ==
Aqours and Saint Snow discography
- The compilation album, titled Aqours Chronicle (2015–2017), released in October 2020
- EPs: 2
- Soundtrack albums: 4
- Live albums: 1
- Compilation albums: 3
- Singles: 64
- Music videos: 10
- Solo version albums: 36
- Blu-ray Disc original CDs: 25
- Live concerts: 24

Aqours was introduced in 2015. The nine members of Aqours are grouped into three subunits: CYaRon! (Chika, You and Ruby), Azalea (stylized in all-caps; Kanan, Dia and Hanamaru), and Guilty Kiss (Riko, Yoshiko and Mari). Seven of Aqours' singles include an anime music video, while two others include a live-action music video featuring the members' voice actresses.

Aqours' duo rival group, Saint Snow, has their own singles, as well as one music video. Some songs are included in Aqours' own singles and albums, while others have their own standalone releases. Aqours and Saint Snow also have a joint idol group named Saint Aqours Snow.

=== Singles ===
Title	Artist(s)	Release date	Peak Oricon chart positions	Certifications (sales thresholds)	Notes
"Kimi no Kokoro wa Kagayaiteru Kai?" (君のこころは輝いてるかい?, Is Your Heart Shining?)	Aqours	October 7, 2015	3	JP: Gold (Note: Select May 2017 from the drop down menu.)	Aqours' first single
"Koi ni Naritai Aquarium" (恋になりたいAQUARIUM, I Want To Fall In Love Aquarium)	Aqours	April 27, 2016	3	JP: Gold (Note: Select September 2017 from the drop down menu.)	Aqours' second single
"Genki Zenkai Day! Day! Day!" (元気全開DAY! DAY! DAY!, Full Speed Energetically DAY! DAY! DAY!)	CYaRon!	May 11, 2016	6		CYaRon!'s first single
"Torikoriko Please!!" (トリコリコPLEASE!!, Please Let Me Capture Your Heart!!)	Azalea	May 25, 2016	7		Azalea's first single
"Strawberry Trapper"	Guilty Kiss	June 8, 2016	5		Guilty Kiss' first single
"Aozora Jumping Heart" (青空Jumping Heart, Blue Sky Jumping Heart)	Aqours	July 20, 2016	4		Opening theme of the anime's first season
"Kimeta yo Hand in Hand" (決めたよHand in Hand, We've Decided Hand in Hand) / "Daisuki dattara Daijōbu!" (ダイスキだったらダイジョウブ!; If You Love It, It's Alright!)	Chika Takami (Anju Inami), You Watanabe (Shuka Saitō), and Riko Sakurauchi (Rikako Aida)	August 3, 2016	5		First insert song's single of the anime's first season
"Yume Kataru yori Yume Utaō" (ユメ語るよりユメ歌おう, Rather Than Talking About Our Dreams, Let's Sing Them)	Aqours	August 24, 2016	3		Ending theme of the anime's first season
"Yume de Yozora o Terashitai" (夢で夜空を照らしたい, I Want To Light Up The Night Sky With Our Dreams) / "Mijuku Dreamer" (未熟DREAMER, Young DREAMER)	Chika Takami (Anju Inami), Riko Sakurauchi (Rikako Aida), You Watanabe (Shuka Saitō), Yoshiko Tsushima (Aika Kobayashi), Hanamaru Kunikida (Kanako Takatsuki), and Ruby Kurosawa (Ai Furihata) / Aqours	September 14, 2016	2		Other two insert song's singles of the anime's first season
"Omoi yo Hitotsu ni Nare" (想いよひとつになれ, Our Feelings, Become One) / "Mirai Ticket"	Chika Takami (Anju Inami), Kanan Matsuura (Nanaka Suwa), Dia Kurosawa (Arisa Komiya), You Watanabe (Shuka Saitō), Yoshiko Tsushima (Aika Kobayashi), Hanamaru Kunikida (Kanako Takatsuki), Mari Ohara (Aina Suzuki), and Ruby Kurosawa (Ai Furihata) / Aqours	November 9, 2016	3		Other two insert song's singles of the anime's first season
"Jingle Bells ga Tomaranai" (ジングルベルが止まらない, Can't Stop The Jingle Bells)	Aqours	November 23, 2016	3		Special single for Love Live! School Idol Festival
"P.S. no Mukōgawa" (P.S.の向こう側, The Other Side of the Postcard)	CYaRon!	March 24, 2017	—		Bonus singles for buying all of the anime's first season Blu-ray volumes from Gamers, Softmap, and Animate, respectively
"Lonely Tuning"	Azalea	March 24, 2017	—		Bonus singles for buying all of the anime's first season Blu-ray volumes from Gamers, Softmap, and Animate, respectively
"Guilty Eyes Fever"	Guilty Kiss	March 24, 2017	—		Bonus singles for buying all of the anime's first season Blu-ray volumes from Gamers, Softmap, and Animate, respectively
"Happy Party Train"	Aqours	April 5, 2017	2		Aqours' third single
"Kinmirai Happy End" (近未来ハッピーエンド, Happy End In The Near Future)	CYaRon!	May 10, 2017	6		CYaRon!'s second single
"Galaxy Hide and Seek"	Azalea	May 31, 2017	4		Azalea's second single
"Kowareyasuki" (コワレヤスキ, Fragile) (Note: The title is the attributive form of the classical Japanese adjective "kowareyasushi" (壊れ易し).)	Guilty Kiss	June 21, 2017	4		Guilty Kiss' second single
"Landing Action Yeah!!"	Aqours	June 30, 2017	3		Aqours' Next Step! Project's theme song. Available on Aqours Club CD Set.
"Mirai no Bokura wa Shitteru yo" (未来の僕らは知ってるよ, Our Future Selves Know)	Aqours	October 25, 2017	3	JP: Gold (Note: Select October 2017 from the drop down menu.)	Opening theme of the anime's second season
"Yūki wa Doko ni? Kimi no Mune ni!" (勇気はどこに？君の胸に！, Where Can You Find Courage? Inside Your Heart!)	Aqours	November 15, 2017	4		Ending theme of the anime's second season
"My Mai Tonight (MY舞☆TONIGHT, MY Dance TONIGHT) / Miracle Wave"	Aqours	November 29, 2017	2		Insert songs of the anime's second season
"Awaken the Power"	Saint Aqours Snow (Aqours & Saint Snow)	December 20, 2017	3	JP: Gold (Note: Select December 2017 from the drop down menu.)	Insert songs of the anime's second season
"Water Blue New World" / "Wonderful Stories"	Aqours	January 18, 2018	4		Insert songs of the anime's second season
"Sakura Bye-bye" (サクラバイバイ, Bye-bye Cherry Blossoms)	CYaRon!	June 22, 2018	—		Bonus singles for buying all of the anime's second season Blu-ray volumes from Gamers, Softmap, and Animate, respectively
"Sotsugyō desu ne" (卒業ですね, It's Graduation)	Azalea	June 22, 2018	—		Bonus singles for buying all of the anime's second season Blu-ray volumes from Gamers, Softmap, and Animate, respectively
"Guilty!? Farewell Party"	Guilty Kiss	June 22, 2018	—		Bonus singles for buying all of the anime's second season Blu-ray volumes from Gamers, Softmap, and Animate, respectively
"Hop Step Waai!" (ホップ・ステップ・ワーイ！, Hop! Step! Yippee!)	Aqours	June 30, 2018	4		Theme song for the Aqours Hop! Step! Jump! Project which also contains subunit mixes for each group. Available on Aqours Club CD Set 2018.
"Thank You, Friends!!" / "No. 10"	Aqours	August 1, 2018	3		Theme song of Aqours 4th LoveLive! Sailing to the Sunshine concert
"Hajimari Road" (ハジマリロード, Starting Road)	Yoshiko Tsushima (Aika Kobayashi), Hanamaru Kunikida (Kanako Takatsuki), and Ruby Kurosawa (Ai Furihata)	November 24, 2018	—		Bonus singles from 7-Eleven
"Marine Border Parasol"	Chika Takami (Anju Inami), Riko Sakurauchi (Rikako Aida), and You Watanabe (Shuka Saitō)	November 24, 2018	—		Bonus singles from 7-Eleven
"Yosoku Fukanou Driving!" (予測不可能Driving!, Unpredictable Driving!)	Kanan Matsuura (Nanaka Suwa), Dia Kurosawa (Arisa Komiya), and Mari Ohara (Aina Suzuki)	November 24, 2018	—		Bonus singles from 7-Eleven
"Bokura no Hashittekita Michi wa..." (僕らの走ってきた道は..., The path we ran on was...) / "Next Sparkling!!"	Aqours	January 23, 2019	1		Songs from Love Live! Sunshine!! The School Idol Movie: Over the Rainbow
"Tōsō Meisō Mobius Loop" (逃走迷走メビウスループ, Runaway Stray Mobius Loop) / "Hop? Stop? Nonstop!"	Kanan Matsuura (Nanaka Suwa), Dia Kurosawa (Arisa Komiya), and Mari Ohara (Aina Suzuki) / Aqours	January 30, 2019	2		Songs from Love Live! Sunshine!! The School Idol Movie: Over the Rainbow
"Believe Again" / "Brightest Melody" / "Over the Next Rainbow"	Saint Snow / Aqours / Saint Aqours Snow	February 6, 2019	3		Songs from Love Live! Sunshine!! The School Idol Movie: Over the Rainbow
"Jump Up High!!"	Aqours	June 30, 2019	2		Theme song for the Aqours' Jump Up! Project, which also contains subunit mixes for each group. Available on Aqours Club CD Set 2019.
"Bouken Type, A, B, C!!" (冒険Type A, B, C‼, Adventure Type A, B, C!!)	Aqours	July 26, 2019	—		Theme song for the Aqours Real Escape Game held in Awashima Marine Park
"Mitaiken Horizon" (未体験HORIZON, Unexperienced HORIZON)	Aqours	September 25, 2019	3		Aqours' fourth single
"Kokoro Magic 'A to Z'" (HEART Magic "A to Z")	Aqours	October 30, 2019	4		Special single for Love Live! School Idol Festival All Stars
"New Romantic Sailors"	Guilty Kiss	November 27, 2019	2		Special singles for Love Live! School Idol Festival
"Braveheart Coaster"	CYaRon!	December 4, 2019	3		Special singles for Love Live! School Idol Festival
"Amazing Travel DNA"	Azalea	December 11, 2019	3		Special singles for Love Live! School Idol Festival
"CYaZalea Kiss Dadandaaan" (シャゼリア☆キッス☆ダダンダーン, CYaZalea Kiss Maulers)	Aqours (as "CYaZalea Kiss") (Note: The name is a combination of Aqours' subunit names: CYaRon!, Azalea and Guilty Kiss.)	May 8, 2020	—		Special CD single for Unit Live Adventure 2020: Perfect World. The song was first featured as part of an official April Fools' Day video on April 1, 2020.
"Fantastic Departure!"	Aqours	July 22, 2020	3	JP: Gold (Note: Select July 2020 from the drop down menu.)	Theme song for the group's sixth live
"Dazzling White Town"	Saint Snow	August 19, 2020	5		Saint Snow's first single
"Jimo-Ai Dash!"	Aqours	August 26, 2020	5		Theme song for the group's 5th anniversary, which also contains solo mixes for each member. Available on Aqours Club CD Set 2020.
"Smile Smile Ship Start!"	Aqours	March 31, 2021	4		Aqours' fifth anniversary single with 3D animated music video
"Dreamy Color"	Aqours	June 30, 2021	4		Aqours' We Are Challengers Project's theme song, featuring a live-action music video, and available on Aqours Club CD Set 2021.
"Ku-Ru-Ku-Ru Cruller!"	Aqours	September 22, 2021	6		Collaboration single with Mixi for Monster Strike video game. Includes a music video.
"Gemstone "De-A-I""	Aqours	March 29, 2022	—		Included in the Love Live! Sunshine!! Blu-ray box.
"Nando datte Yakusoku!" (なんどだって約束！, Countless Promises!)	Aqours	April 13, 2022	3		Theme song for Aqours' sixth live.
"Yume+Mirai=Mugendai!" (ユメ+ミライ=無限大！, Dreams + Future = Infinity)	Aqours	June 30, 2022	5		Aqours' Mugendai World Project's theme song, available on Aqours Club CD Set 2022.
"Banzai! Digital Trippers"	Aqours, Hatsune Miku	August 24, 2022	3		Collaboration single with Hatsune Miku. Includes a music video.
"Sora, Fuji, Sunshine!"	Aqours	June 30, 2023	6		Theme song for the group's 8th anniversary, available on Aqours Club CD Set 2023.
"Genjitsu Mysterium" (幻日ミステリウム, Parhelion Mysterium)	Aqours	July 26, 2023	7		Opening theme of Yohane the Parhelion: Sunshine in the Mirror
"Kimi no Tame Boku no Tame" (キミノタメボクノタメ, For You, For Me)	Aqours	August 2, 2023	7		Ending theme of Yohane the Parhelion: Sunshine in the Mirror
"Far Far Away" / "Be As One!!!"	Yohane (Aika Kobayashi) / Dia (Arisa Komiya), Ruby (Ai Furihata), and Chika (Anju Inami)	August 23, 2023	8		Insert songs from Yohane the Parhelion: Sunshine in the Mirror
"R・E・P" / "Hey, Dear My Friends"	Hanamaru (Kanako Takatsuki), You (Shuka Saitō), and Kanan (Nanaka Suwa) / Yohane (Aika Kobayashi), Riko (Rikako Aida), and Mari (Aina Suzuki)	September 6, 2023	14		Insert songs from Yohane the Parhelion: Sunshine in the Mirror
"Girls!!" / "Wonder Sea Breeze"	Yohane (Aika Kobayashi) / Yohane (Aika Kobayashi), Hanamaru (Kanako Takatsuki), Dia (Arisa Komiya), Ruby (Ai Furihata), Chika (Anju Inami), You (Shuka Saitō), Kanan (Nanaka Suwa), Riko (Rikako Aida), and Mari (Aina Suzuki)	September 27, 2023	13		Insert songs from Yohane the Parhelion: Sunshine in the Mirror
"Forever U & I" / "La La Yuuki no Uta" (La la 勇気のうた, La la Song of Courage)	Yohane (Aika Kobayashi) / Yohane (Aika Kobayashi), Hanamaru (Kanako Takatsuki), Dia (Arisa Komiya), Ruby (Ai Furihata), Chika (Anju Inami), You (Shuka Saitō), Kanan (Nanaka Suwa), Riko (Rikako Aida), and Mari (Aina Suzuki)	October 11, 2023	11		Insert songs from Yohane the Parhelion: Sunshine in the Mirror
"Deep Blue"	Aqours	May 29, 2024	15		Theme song for Yohane the Parhelion: Blaze in the Deep Blue
"Bokura no Umi de Mata Aou" (僕らの海でまた会おう, Let's Meet At Our Ocean Again)	Aqours	June 30, 2024	7		Theme song for Aqours' 9th anniversary project
"Eikyuu Hours" (永久hours, Eternal Hours)	Aqours	December 18, 2024	1	JP: Platinum (Note: Select December 2024 from the drop down menu.)	Theme song for Aqours Finale Love Live!, featuring a live-action music video.
TBA	GKSS / Guilty Kiss / Saint Snow	March 11, 2026	TBA		GKSS's first single, including two songs by GKSS, one song by Guilty Kiss, and one song by Saint Snow.
"—" denotes releases that were ineligible to chart.

=== Original song CDs ===
BD volume	Title	Artist(s)	Release date
Season 1
1	"Pops Heart de Odorun da mon!" (Pops heartで踊るんだもん!, Because We Want to Dance in Pops Heart)	Aqours	September 27, 2016
2	"Sora mo Kokoro mo Hareru kara" (空も心も晴れるから, Because Our Hearts Will Clear Up Just Like The Skies)	Chika Takami (Anju Inami), Riko Sakurauchi (Rikako Aida), and You Watanabe (Shuka Saitō)	October 26, 2016
3	"Waku-Waku-Week!"	Yoshiko Tsushima (Aika Kobayashi), Hanamaru Kunikida (Kanako Takatsuki), and Ruby Kurosawa (Ai Furihata)	November 25, 2016
4	"Daydream Warrior"	Aqours	December 22, 2016
5	"G Senjō no Cinderella" (G線上のシンデレラ, Cinderella on the G String)	Kanan Matsuura (Nanaka Suwa), Dia Kurosawa (Arisa Komiya), and Mari Ohara (Aina Suzuki)	January 27, 2017
6	"Thrilling One-way" (スリリング・ワンウェイ, Suriringu Wanwei)	Aqours	February 24, 2017
7	"Taiyō o Oikakero!" (太陽を追いかけろ!, Follow the Sun!)	Aqours	March 24, 2017
Season 2
1	"One More Sunshine Story"	Chika Takami (Anju Inami)	December 22, 2017
2	"Oyasuminasan!" (おやすみなさん！, lit. "Good Night Everyone!")	Kunikida Hanamaru (Kanako Takatsuki)	January 26, 2018
3	"In This Unstable World"	Yoshiko Tsushima (Aika Kobayashi)	February 23, 2018
3	"Pianoforte Monologue"	Riko Sakurauchi (Rikako Aida)	February 23, 2018
4	"Beginner's Sailing"	You Watanabe (Shuka Saitō)	March 23, 2018
5	"Red Gem Wink"	Ruby Kurosawa (Ai Furihata)	April 24, 2018
5	"White First Love"	Dia Kurosawa (Arisa Komiya)	April 24, 2018
6	"New Winding Road"	Mari Ohara (Aina Suzuki)	May 25, 2018
6	"Sakana ka Nanda ka?" (さかなかなんだか?)	Kanan Matsuura (Nanaka Suwa)	May 25, 2018
7	"Kiseki Hikaru" (キセキヒカル, Shining Miracle)	Aqours	June 22, 2018
Film
	"I-n-g, I Try!!"	Aqours	July 26, 2019
Yohane the Parhelion
1	"Te・Ki・Na Music" (テ・キ・ナ ミュージック)	Yohane (Aika Kobayashi)	September 27, 2023
2	"Tick-Tack, Tick-Tack"	Yohane (Aika Kobayashi) and Hanamaru (Kanako Takatsuki)	October 27, 2023
3	"Best Wishes"	Dia (Arisa Komiya) and Mari (Aina Suzuki)	November 22, 2023
4	"Special Holidays"	Chika (Anju Inami), Kanan (Nanaka Suwa), and You (Shuka Saitō)	December 22, 2023
5	"Koukishin Journey" (好奇心ジャーニー, Curiosity Journey)	Riko (Rikako Aida) and Ruby (Ai Furihata)	January 26, 2024
6	"Numazu Yassa Yoisa Uta" (ヌマヅやっさよいさ唄)	Aqours	February 28, 2024
7	"Bloom of Colors"	Aqours and Lailaps (Yoko Hikasa)	March 27, 2024

=== Extended plays (EPs) ===
Title	Artist(s)	Release date	Track listing	Peak Oricon chart positions	Notes
Duo/Trio Collection CD Vol. 1 Summer Vacation (デュオトリオコレクションCD VOL.1 SUMMER VACATION)	Aqours	August 2, 2017	4 tracks: 1. "Natsu e no Tobira Never End Ver." (夏への扉 Never end ver.) by Riko Sakurauchi, Hanamaru Kunikida, and Mari Ohara; 2. "Manatsu wa Dare no Mono?" (真夏は誰のモノ?) by Dia Kurosawa and Ruby Kurosawa; 3. "Jimo Ai ♡ Mantan ☆ Summer Life" (地元愛♡満タン☆サマーライフ) by You Watanabe and Yoshiko Tsushima; 4. "Natsu no Owari no Amaoto ga" (夏の終わりの雨音が) by Chika Takami and Kanan Matsuura	4	Aqours' first duo and trio EP
Duo/Trio Collection CD Vol. 2 Winter Vacation (デュオトリオコレクションCD VOL.2 WINTER VACATION)	Aqours	December 9, 2020	4 tracks: 1. "Kimochi mo Yume mo Issho da ne!" (キモチもユメも一緒だね!) by Hanamaru Kunikida and Ruby Kurosawa; 2. "Namida ga Yuki ni Naru Mae ni" (涙が雪になる前に) by Kanan Matsuura and Mari Ohara; 3. "Misty Frosty Love" by Riko Sakurauchi and You Watanabe; 4. "Party! Party! PaPaPaParty!" by Chika Takami, Dia Kurosawa, and Yoshiko Tsushima	5	Aqours' second duo and trio EP

=== Albums ===
Title	Artist(s)	Release date	Peak Oricon chart positions	Notes
Sailing to the Sunshine	Aqours, Saint Snow & Tatsuya Kato	November 30, 2016	6	Soundtrack from the anime's first season
Journey to the Sunshine	Aqours, Saint Snow, Saint Aqours Snow (Aqours & Saint Snow) & Tatsuya Kato	January 31, 2018	7	Soundtrack from the anime's second season
Sailing to the Rainbow	Aqours, Saint Snow, Saint Aqours Snow (Aqours & Saint Snow) & Tatsuya Kato	February 27, 2019	18	Soundtrack from Love Live! Sunshine!! The School Idol Movie Over the Rainbow
Chika Takami First Solo Concert Album: One More Sunshine Story	Chika Takami (Anju Inami)	August 1, 2020	3	First batch of solo albums
Riko Sakurauchi First Solo Concert Album: Pianoforte Monologue	Riko Sakurauchi (Rikako Aida)	September 19, 2020	8	First batch of solo albums
Ruby Kurosawa First Solo Concert Album: Red Gem Wink	Ruby Kurosawa (Ai Furihata)	September 21, 2020	10	First batch of solo albums
Aqours Chronicle (2015–2017)	Aqours	October 7, 2020	3	A compilation of songs that also includes one new song, "made by everyone"
Dia Kurosawa First Solo Concert Album: White First Love	Dia Kurosawa (Arisa Komiya)	January 1, 2021	2	First batch of solo albums
Kanan Matsuura First Solo Concert Album: Sakana ka Nanda ka?	Kanan Matsuura (Nanaka Suwa)	February 10, 2021	5	First batch of solo albums
Hanamaru Kunikida First Solo Concert Album: Oyasuminasan!	Hanamaru Kunikida (Kanako Takatsuki)	March 4, 2021	4	First batch of solo albums
You Watanabe First Solo Concert Album	You Watanabe (Shuka Saitō)	April 17, 2021	4	First batch of solo albums
Aru Hi... Eien Mitai ni! (ある日...永遠みたいに！)	CYaRon!	June 2, 2021	2	CYaRon!'s first album
Mari Ohara First Solo Concert Album: New Winding Road	Mari Ohara (Aina Suzuki)	June 13, 2021	7	First batch of solo albums
We'll Get the Next Dream!!!	Azalea	June 23, 2021	5	Azalea's first album
Yoshiko Tsushima First Solo Concert Album: In This Unstable World	Yoshiko Tsushima (Aika Kobayashi)	July 13, 2021	4	First batch of solo albums
Shooting Star Warrior	Guilty Kiss	July 28, 2021	3	Guilty Kiss' first album
Second Solo Concert Album: The Story of Feather – Starring Takami Chika	Chika Takami (Anju Inami)	August 1, 2021	11	Second batch of solo albums
Second Solo Concert Album: The Story of Feather – Starring Sakurauchi Riko	Riko Sakurauchi (Rikako Aida)	September 19, 2021	9	Second batch of solo albums
Second Solo Concert Album: The Story of Feather – Starring Kurosawa Ruby	Ruby Kurosawa (Ai Furihata)	September 21, 2021	16	Second batch of solo albums
Aqours Chronicle (2018–2020)	Aqours	October 7, 2021	3	Second compilation album
Second Solo Concert Album: The Story of Feather – Starring Kurosawa Dia	Dia Kurosawa (Arisa Komiya)	January 1, 2022	3	Second batch of solo albums
Second Solo Concert Album: The Story of Feather – Starring Matsuura Kanan	Kanan Matsuura (Nanaka Suwa)	February 10, 2022	10	Second batch of solo albums
Second Solo Concert Album: The Story of Feather – Starring Kunikida Hanamaru	Hanamaru Kunikida (Kanako Takatsuki)	March 4, 2022	8	Second batch of solo albums
Second Solo Concert Album: The Story of Feather – Starring Watanabe You	You Watanabe (Shuka Saitō)	April 17, 2022	7	Second batch of solo albums
Second Solo Concert Album: The Story of Feather – Starring Ohara Mari	Mari Ohara (Aina Suzuki)	June 13, 2022	11	Second batch of solo albums
Second Solo Concert Album: The Story of Feather – Starring Tsushima Yoshiko	Yoshiko Tsushima (Aika Kobayashi)	July 13, 2022	10	Second batch of solo albums
Third Solo Concert Album: The Story of "Over the Rainbow" – Starring Takami Chika	Chika Takami (Anju Inami)	August 1, 2022	18	Third batch of solo albums
Third Solo Concert Album: The Story of "Over the Rainbow" – Starring Sakurauchi Riko	Riko Sakurauchi (Rikako Aida)	September 19, 2022	15	Third batch of solo albums
Third Solo Concert Album: The Story of "Over the Rainbow" – Starring Kurosawa Ruby	Ruby Kurosawa (Ai Furihata)	September 21, 2022	11	Third batch of solo albums
Third Solo Concert Album: The Story of "Over the Rainbow" – Starring Kurosawa Dia	Dia Kurosawa (Arisa Komiya)	January 1, 2023	17	Third batch of solo albums
Third Solo Concert Album: The Story of "Over the Rainbow" – Starring Matsuura Kanan	Kanan Matsuura (Nanaka Suwa)	February 10, 2023	9	Third batch of solo albums
The Blue Swell	Aqours	February 15, 2023	16	Rock remixes of 10 songs from the Love Live! series.
Third Solo Concert Album: The Story of "Over the Rainbow" – Starring Kunikida Hanamaru	Hanamaru Kunikida (Kanako Takatsuki)	March 4, 2023	12	Third batch of solo albums
Third Solo Concert Album: The Story of "Over the Rainbow" – Starring Watanabe You	You Watanabe (Shuka Saitō)	April 17, 2023	12	Third batch of solo albums
Third Solo Concert Album: The Story of "Over the Rainbow" – Starring Ohara Mari	Mari Ohara (Aina Suzuki)	June 13, 2023	12	Third batch of solo albums
Third Solo Concert Album: The Story of "Over the Rainbow" – Starring Tsushima Yoshiko	Yoshiko Tsushima (Aika Kobayashi)	July 13, 2023	8	Third batch of solo albums
Everyone's Sound	Aqours & Tatsuya Kato	October 25, 2023	47	Soundtrack from Yohane the Parhelion: Sunshine in the Mirror
Fourth Solo Concert Album: The Story of Sunshine! – Starring Takami Chika	Chika Takami (Anju Inami)	August 1, 2024	21	Fourth batch of solo albums
Fourth Solo Concert Album: The Story of Sunshine! – Starring Sakurauchi Riko	Riko Sakurauchi (Rikako Aida)	September 19, 2024	20	Fourth batch of solo albums
Fourth Solo Concert Album: The Story of Sunshine! – Starring Kurosawa Ruby	Ruby Kurosawa (Ai Furihata)	September 21, 2024	22	Fourth batch of solo albums
Fourth Solo Concert Album: The Story of Sunshine! – Starring Kurosawa Dia	Dia Kurosawa (Arisa Komiya)	January 1, 2025	12	Fourth batch of solo albums
Fourth Solo Concert Album: The Story of Sunshine! – Starring Matsuura Kanan	Kanan Matsuura (Nanaka Suwa)	February 10, 2025	17	Fourth batch of solo albums
Fourth Solo Concert Album: The Story of Sunshine! – Starring Kunikida Hanamaru	Hanamaru Kunikida (Kanako Takatsuki)	March 4, 2025	26	Fourth batch of solo albums
Fourth Solo Concert Album: The Story of Sunshine! – Starring Watanabe You	You Watanabe (Shuka Saitō)	April 17, 2025	13	Fourth batch of solo albums
Fourth Solo Concert Album: The Story of Sunshine! – Starring Ohara Mari	Mari Ohara (Aina Suzuki)	June 13, 2025	17	Fourth batch of solo albums
Fourth Solo Concert Album: The Story of Sunshine! – Starring Tsushima Yoshiko	Yoshiko Tsushima (Aika Kobayashi)	July 13, 2025	20	Fourth batch of solo albums
Aqours Chronicle (2021–2024)	Aqours	November 12, 2025	15	Third compilation album
Aqours Finale LoveLive! Eikyuu Stage – Live Recording CD (Aqours Finale LoveLive! ～永久stage～ ライブ音源CD)	Aqours	March 11, 2026	TBA	Live recording album of songs on the set list of Aqours Finale LoveLive! Eikyuu Stage

=== Live concerts and video albums ===
Title	Artist(s)	Concert date(s)	Video release date(s)	Format	Peak Oricon chart positions
Aqours First Love Live! Step! Zero to One (Note: Held at Yokohama Arena)	Aqours	February 25–26, 2017	September 27, 2017	BD/DVD	35 (DVD Day 1); 20 (DVD Day 2); 114 (BD Day 1); 51 (BD Day 2); 2 (BD Memorial Box)
Aqours 2nd Love Live! Happy Party Train Tour (Note: Held at Nippon Gaishi Hall (Nagoya), World Memorial Hall (Kobe) & MetLife Dome (Saitama).)	Aqours	August 5–6, 2017 (Nagoya); August 19–20, 2017 (Kobe); September 29–30, 2017 (Saitama)	April 25, 2018 (Saitama) (Note: The performances exclusively held in Nagoya and Kobe are included in a bonus disk.)	BD/DVD	34 (DVD Day 1); 24 (DVD Day 2); 74 (BD Day 1); 41 (BD Day 2); 4 (BD Memorial Box)
Saint Snow Presents Love Live! Sunshine!! Hakodate Unit Carnival (Note: Held at Hakodate Arena.)	Saint Snow; CYaRon! Azalea; Guilty Kiss	April 27–28, 2018	October 24, 2018	BD/DVD	57 (DVD Day 1); 50 (DVD Day 2); 176 (BD Day 1); 133 (BD Day 2); 3 (BD Memorial Box)
Aqours 3rd Love Live! Tour Wonderful Stories (Note: Held at MetLife Dome (Saitama), Osaka-jo Hall (Osaka) & Marine Messe Fukuoka (Fukuoka).)	Aqours	June 9–10, 2018 (Saitama); June 16–17, 2018 (Osaka); July 7–8, 2018 (Fukuoka)	March 6, 2019 (Saitama) (Note: The performances exclusively held in Osaka and Fukuoka are included in a bonus disc.)	BD/DVD	22 (DVD); 1 (BD); 1 (BD Memorial Box)
Aqours World Love Live in LA: Beyond the Pacific (Note: Held at Microsoft Theater (Los Angeles).)	Aqours	July 4, 2018	TBA	TBA	TBA
Aqours 4th Love Live! Sailing to the Sunshine	Aqours	November 17–18, 2018	May 29, 2019	BD/DVD	30 (DVD Day 1); 19 (DVD Day 2); 86 (BD Day 1); 43 (BD Day 2); 1 (BD Memorial Box)
Aqours World Love Live! Asia Tour 2019 (Note: Held at National Exhibition and Convention Center (Shanghai), Taipei International Convention Center (Taipei), Makuhari Event Hall (Chiba), & Korea University Hwajeong Tiger Dome (Seoul.))	Aqours	March 23–24, 2019 (Shanghai); April 6–7, 2019 (Taipei); April 13–14, 2019 (Chiba); April 20–21, 2019 (Seoul)	February 16, 2022 (Seoul) (Note: The performances for day 2 of the Seoul leg of Aqours World Love Live! Asia Tour 2019 and day 1 of Aqours World Love Live! in LA: Brand New Wave are both included in the Aqours World Love Live! Blu-ray Memorial Box album.)	BD	8
Aqours 5th Love Live! Next Sparkling!! (Note: Held at Belluna Dome (formerly MetLife Dome).)	Aqours	June 8–9, 2019	January 8, 2020	BD/DVD	24 (DVD Day 1); 17 (DVD Day 2); 78 (BD Day 1); 50 (BD Day 2); 1 (BD Memorial Box)
Aqours World Love Live! in LA: Brand New Wave (Note: Held at The Novo by Microsoft (Los Angeles).)	Aqours	July 5–6, 2019	February 16, 2022	BD	8
Unit Live Adventure 2020: Guilty Kiss' First Love Live! New Romantic Sailors (Note: Held at Musashino Forest Sport Plaza.)	Guilty Kiss	February 8–9, 2020	August 25, 2021	BD	8
Unit Live Adventure 2020: CYaRon!'s First Love Live! Braveheart Coaster (Note: Held at West Japan General Exhibition Center.)	CYaRon!	February 22–23, 2020	August 25, 2021	BD	12
Unit Live Adventure 2020: Azalea's First Love Live! Amazing Travel DNA (Note: Planned to be held at Xebio Arena Sendai)	Azalea	Cancelled (Note: Originally planned to be held on March 7–8, 2020, then was rescheduled to June 3–4. Ultimately cancelled due to the COVID-19 pandemic.)	–	–	–
Unit Live Adventure 2020: Extra Live Performance – Perfect World (Note: Planned to be held at Saitama Super Arena.)	CYaRon! Azalea; Guilty Kiss	Cancelled (Note: Originally planned to be held on May 9–10, 2020. Cancelled due to the COVID-19 pandemic.)	–	–	–
Aqours 6th Love Live! Dome Tour 2020	Aqours	Cancelled (Note: Originally planned to be held from September 2020 to January 2021 at various venues. Cancelled due to the COVID-19 pandemic.)	–	–	–
Aqours Online Love Live! Lost World (Note: Paid online live stream concert, as replacement for the cancelled 6th Love Live! Dome Tour.)	Aqours	October 10–11, 2020	July 7, 2021 (Note: Both Aqours Online Love Live! performances are included in a Blu-ray Disc Memorial Box album.)	BD	4
Saint Snow's 1st Gig: Welcome to Dazzling White Town (Note: Paid online live stream concert, held at Pia Arena MM & Makomanai Sekisui Heim Ice Arena.)	Saint Snow	October 17–18, 2020 (Yokohama); November 7–8, 2020 (Sapporo)	June 9, 2021	BD	3
Aqours Countdown Love Live! White Island (Note: Online live stream concert. The first portions of the concert was streamed for free on YouTube Live, while the rest required payment.)	Aqours (Note: Excluding Kanako Takatsuki (Hanamaru Kunikida) due to her poor physical condition. However, she appeared in pre-recorded video portions in the concert.)	December 30–31, 2020	July 7, 2021	BD	4
Azalea's First Love Live! Amazing Travel DNA – Try Again (Note: The added subtitle Try Again refers to the cancellation of the first concert of the same name.)	Azalea	Cancelled (Note: Originally planned to be held on February 27–28, 2021. Cancelled due to extension of state of emergency in Japan as result of the COVID-19 pandemic.)	–	–	–
Aqours 5th Anniversary Love Live! Let's Go Wonder Trip (Note: Planned to be held at Tsumakoi Resort Aya no Sato in Shizuoka.)	Aqours	Cancelled (Note: Originally planned to be held on May 1–2, 2021. The concert is cancelled as result of the state of emergency was declared as result of COVID-19 pandemic.)	–	–	–
Azalea's 1st Love Live! In the Dark - Himitsu no Story (AZALEA 1st LoveLive! ～In The Dark /*秘密の物語*/～) (Note: Held at Xebio Arena Sendai.)	Azalea (Note: Excluding Kanako Takatsuki (Hanamaru Kunikida) due to her poor physical condition.)	August 14–15, 2021	June 1, 2022	BD	4
Guilty Kiss' 2nd Love Live! Return to Love Kiss Kiss Kiss (Note: Held at Tokyo Garden Theater.)	Guilty Kiss	September 25–26, 2021	December 7, 2022	BD	15
CYaRon!'s 2nd Love Live! Dai Kakumei Wake Up Kingdom (CYaRon! 2nd LoveLive! ～大革命☆Wake Up Kingdom～) (Note: Held at Makuhari Messe Event Hall.)	CYaRon!	October 16–17, 2021	November 16, 2022	BD	12
Azalea's 2nd Love Live! Amazing Travel DNA Reboot	Azalea	November 15–16, 2021	December 21, 2022	BD	TBA
Aqours Extra LoveLive! Dreamy Concert 2021 (ラブライブ！サンシャイン!! Aqours EXTRA LoveLive! ～DREAMY CONCERT 2021～) (Note: Held at Pia Arena MM.)	Aqours	December 29–30, 2021	August 17, 2022	BD	4
Aqours 6th Love Live! Ku-Ru-Ku-Ru Rock 'n' Roll Tour (Note: Held at Vantelin Dome Nagoya, Belluna Dome (formerly MetLife Dome) & Tokyo Dome.)	Aqours	February 12–13, 2022 (Ocean Stage, Nagoya); March 5–6, 2022 (Sunny Stage, Saitama); June 25–26, 2022 (Windy Stage, Tokyo)	November 2, 2022 (Nagoya); December 14, 2022 (Saitama); February 15, 2023 (Tokyo)	BD	7 (Ocean Stage); 10 (Sunny Stage); 5 (Windy Stage)
Aqours Extra LoveLive! 2023: It's a Mugendai World (Aqours EXTRA ラブライブ！ 2023 ~It's a 無限大☆WORLD~) (Note: Held at Musashino Forest Sport Plaza & Makuhari Messe Event Hall.)	Aqours	February 11–12, 2023 (Valentine's Day Concert, Chofu); March 11–12, 2023 (White Day Concert, Chiba)	December 13, 2023	BD	12
Yohane the Parhelion: The Story of the Sound of Heart (幻日のヨハネ -The Story of the Sound of Heart-)	Aqours	December 15–17, 2023	November 27, 2024	BD	20
Aqours Finale LoveLive! Eikyuu Stage (ラブライブ!サンシャイン!! Aqours Finale LoveLive! ～永久stage～)	Aqours	June 21–22, 2025	February 11, 2026	BD	TBA
Guilty Kiss × Saint Snow Two-Man Live	Guilty Kiss; Saint Snow	July 4–5, 2026	TBA	TBA	TBA

=== Radio CDs ===
Title	Artist(s)	Release date	Peak Oricon chart positions	Notes
"Waai Wai Wai Wai Wai Wai!" (わーいわいわい わいわいわい！)	YYY (Note: A subunit with You Watanabe (Shuka Saitō), Yoshiko Tsushima (Aika Kobayashi), and Ruby Kurosawa (Ai Furihata).)	November 9, 2022	12	First theme CD by the hosts of the Love Live! Sunshine!! radio program.
"Peace Piece Pizza"	YYY	May 8, 2024	10	Second theme CD by the hosts of the Love Live! Sunshine!! radio program.

== Love Live! Nijigasaki High School Idol Club ==
Nijigasaki High School Idol Club discography
- Tokimeki Runners was the Nijigasaki High School Idol Club's first album, released in November 2018. It is also the opening theme for Love Live! School Idol Festival All Stars.
- Studio albums: 5
- EPs: 3
- Soundtrack albums: 4
- Singles: 46
- Music videos: 3
- Blu-ray Disc original CDs: 17
- Live concerts: 19

The twelve members of Nijigasaki High School Idol Club release music both as solo idols and as a collective group. Though not a member of the idol group, a thirteenth member of the club introduced in the group's anime, Yu, occasionally participates in group releases and events. The group initially debuted with a nine-member lineup in 2018, consisting of Ayumu, Kasumi, Shizuku, Karin, Ai, Kanata, Setsuna, Emma, and Rina. In 2020, Shioriko joined the group, while members Mia and Lanzhu would follow in 2021. They have three anime music videos released across one album and one single.

Unlike the previous subunit format used for μ's and Aqours, the first nine members of Nijigasaki High School Idol Club were instead split into three groups of two, three, and four members. A fourth subunit featuring the last three members to join would later follow. These four subunits are: DiverDiva (Karin and Ai), A・Zu・Na (Ayumu, Shizuku, and Setsuna), Qu4rtz (pronounced "Quartz"; Kasumi, Kanata, Emma, and Rina), and R3birth (pronounced "Rebirth"; Shioriko, Mia, and Lanzhu).

=== Singles ===
Title	Artist(s)	Release date	Peak Oricon chart positions	Notes
"Super Nova"	DiverDiva	February 12, 2020	9	DiverDiva's 1st single
"Dream Land! Dream World!"	A・Zu・Na	February 12, 2020	8	A・Zu・Na's 1st single
"Sing & Smile!!"	Qu4rtz	February 12, 2020	10	Qu4rtz's 1st single
"Muteki-kyū*Believer" (無敵級*ビリーバー, Invincible Believer)	Kasumi Nakasu (Mayu Sagara)	July 29, 2020	3	A single by Kasumi Nakasu, who won a solo single election held in 2019. Also includes single by Nijigasaki, "Mirai Harmony" (未来ハーモニー). Includes music videos for both singles.
"Nijiiro Passions!" (虹色Passions!, Rainbow-Colored Passions!)	Nijigasaki High School Idol Club	October 21, 2020	4	Anime series opening theme
"Neo Sky, Neo Map!"	Nijigasaki High School Idol Club	November 4, 2020	5	Anime series ending theme
"Dream With You" / "Poppin' Up!" / "Dive!"	Ayumu Uehara (Aguri Ōnishi), Kasumi Nakasu (Mayu Sagara), & Setsuna Yuki (Tomori Kusunoki)	November 18, 2020	3	Insert songs from episodes 1–3. Divided into 3 jacket types.
"Saikō Heart" (サイコーハート, Brave Heart) / "La Bella Patria" / "Tsunagaru Connect" (ツナガルコネクト)	Ai Miyashita (Natsumi Murakami), Emma Verde (Maria Sashide), & Rina Tennoji (Chiemi Tanaka)	December 2, 2020	3	Insert songs from episodes 4–6. Divided into 3 jacket types.
"Butterfly" / "Solitude Rain" / "Vivid World"	Kanata Konoe (Akari Kitō), Shizuku Osaka (Kaori Maeda), & Karin Asaka (Miyu Kubota)	December 16, 2020	5	Insert songs from episodes 7–9. Divided into 3 jacket types.
"Awakening Promise" / "Yume ga Koko Kara Hajimaru yo" (夢がここからはじまるよ, Our Dreams Begin Here)	Ayumu Uehara (Aguri Ōnishi) & Nijigasaki High School Idol Club	January 13, 2021	3	Insert songs from episodes 12–13. Divided into 2 jacket types.
"The Secret Night"	DiverDiva	May 26, 2021	9	DiverDiva's 2nd single
"Maze Town"	A・Zu・Na	June 16, 2021	6	A・Zu・Na's 2nd single
"Swinging!"	Qu4rtz	July 14, 2021	5	Qu4rtz's 2nd single
"Monster Girls"	R3birth	October 6, 2021	7	R3birth's 1st single. Includes solo songs of each member.
"Colorful Dreams! Colorful Smiles!"	Nijigasaki High School Idol Club	April 20, 2022	3	Opening theme of the anime's second season
"Yume ga Bokura no Taiyō sa" (夢が僕らの太陽さ, Our Dream Is Our Sun)	Nijigasaki High School Idol Club	April 27, 2022	3	Ending theme of the anime's second season
"Enjoy It!"	Qu4rtz	May 11, 2022	6	Insert song from episode 3.
"Eternal Light"	DiverDiva	May 25, 2022	7	Insert song from episode 4.
"Infinity! Our Wings!!"	A・Zu・Na	June 8, 2022	7	Insert song from episode 6.
"Eutopia" / "Emotion" / "Stars We Chase"	Lanzhu Zhong (Akina Homoto), Shioriko Mifune (Moeka Koizumi), & Mia Taylor (Shu Uchida)	June 22, 2022	5	Insert songs from episodes 1, 7 and 9. Divided into 3 jacket types.
"Future Parade"	Nijigasaki High School Idol Club	July 27, 2022	10	Insert song from episode 13.
"Vroom Vroom"	R3birth	September 28, 2022	2	R3birth's 2nd single
"Shadow Effect"	DiverDiva	October 5, 2022	5	DiverDiva's 3rd single
"Eien no Isshun" (永遠の一瞬, A Moment of Eternity)	Nijigasaki High School Idol Club	October 12, 2022	6	Includes single by Nijigasaki, "Our P13ces!!!"
"Blue!"	A・Zu・Na	November 2, 2022	5	A・Zu・Na's 3rd single
"Pastel"	Qu4rtz	November 23, 2022	10	Qu4rtz's 3rd single
"What You Gonna Do?" (わちゅごなどぅー)	Nijigasaki High School Idol Club	February 1, 2023	4	Ending theme of Nijiyon Animation.
"Kagayaki Don't Forget!"	Nijigasaki High School Idol Club	June 7, 2023	13	Insert song in Chapter 53 of Love Live! School Idol Festival All Stars.
"Feel Alive" / "Go Our Way!"	R3birth & Nijigasaki High School Idol Club	June 28, 2023	5	Insert songs from the OVA. Divided into 2 jacket types.
"Singing, Dreaming, Now!"	Nijigasaki High School Idol Club	July 5, 2023	5	Ending theme from the OVA.
"New Year's March!" / "Radio Taisou Dai Ichi (Nijigasaki High School Idol Club Ver.)" (ラジオ体操第一(虹ヶ咲学園スクールアイドル同好会 Ver.), Radio Calisthenics No. 1 (Nijigasaki High School Idol Club Ver.))	Nijigasaki High School Idol Club	January 24, 2024	5	Double A-side single containing a theme song for Love Live! School Idol Festival 2: Miracle Live!
"Nijigasaki Gakuen Kōka" (虹ヶ咲学園校歌, Nijigasaki High School Song)	Nijigasaki High School Idol Club	April 10, 2024	4	Ending theme of Nijiyon Animation's second season.
"White Delight"	Mia Taylor (Shu Uchida)	January 29, 2025	10	Singles for Nijigaku Monthly Songs Project.
"Starry Night Serenade"	Emma Verde (Maria Sashide)	February 12, 2025	11	Singles for Nijigaku Monthly Songs Project.
"The Sweetest Time♡"	Ayumu Uehara (Aguri Ōnishi)	March 12, 2025	10	Singles for Nijigaku Monthly Songs Project.
"Nijiiro☆Lumiere" (にじいろ☆ルミエール)	Kasumi Nakasu (Mayu Sagara)	April 1, 2025	11	Singles for Nijigaku Monthly Songs Project.
"What a Beautiful Day!"	Kanata Konoe (Akari Kitō)	May 1, 2025	16	Singles for Nijigaku Monthly Songs Project.
"Eternalize Love!!"	Nijigasaki High School Idol Club	May 14, 2025	15	Theme song for the visual novel Tokimeki Roadmap to Future (トキメキの未来地図, Tokimeki no Mirai Chizu), which also contains solo mixes for each member.
"Pichichaputintontanton" (ピチチャプティントンタントン)	Shizuku Osaka (Kaori Maeda)	June 11, 2025	13	Singles for Nijigaku Monthly Songs Project.
"Ride the Wave!"	Ai Miyashita (Natsumi Murakami)	July 16, 2025	13	Singles for Nijigaku Monthly Songs Project.
"Summer Warning"	Rina Tennoji (Chiemi Tanaka)	August 6, 2025	8	Singles for Nijigaku Monthly Songs Project.
"Cheer Mode"	A.L.A.N (Note: An alias used by Rina Tennoji (Chiemi Tanaka) in Love Live! Nijigasaki High School Idol Club The Movie Final Chapter Part 2.)	August 27, 2025 (Digital)	—	Insert song from Love Live! Nijigasaki High School Idol Club The Movie Final Chapter Part 2.
"Sanketsu" (酸欠)	Shioriko Mifune (Moeka Koizumi)	September 17, 2025	9	Singles for Nijigaku Monthly Songs Project.
"Dress Code"	Karin Asaka (Miyu Kubota)	October 15, 2025	20	Singles for Nijigaku Monthly Songs Project.
"Yes! to Tomorrow"	Setsuna Yuki (Coco Hayashi)	November 19, 2025	12	Singles for Nijigaku Monthly Songs Project.
"Bravo!"	Lanzhu Zhong (Akina Homoto)	December 24, 2025	15	Singles for Nijigaku Monthly Songs Project.

=== Original song CDs ===
BD volume	Title	Artist(s)	Release date
Season 1
1	"Power Spot!!"	DiverDiva	December 24, 2020
2	"Kakushiaji!"	A・Zu・Na	January 27, 2021
3	"Make-Up Session ABC"	Qu4rtz	February 25, 2021
4	"Saika" (祭花 -saika-)	DiverDiva	March 26, 2021
5	"Happy Nyan! Days"	A・Zu・Na	April 27, 2021
6	"Twinkle Town"	Qu4rtz	May 26, 2021
7	"Hurray Hurray"	Nijigasaki High School Idol Club	June 25, 2021
Season 2
1	"Fashionista"	DiverDiva	June 24, 2022
2	"Fuwa Fuwa Hour!" (Fuwa Fuwaアワー！)	Qu4rtz	July 27, 2022
3	"Romance no Naka de" (ロマンスの中で)	A・Zu・Na	August 26, 2022
4	"Look At Me Now"	R3birth	September 28, 2022
5	"Tokimeki Runners (12 Members Ver.)" (TOKIMEKI Runners（12人Ver.))	Nijigasaki High School Idol Club	October 28, 2022
6	"Love U My Friends (12 Members Ver.)" (Love U my friends（12人Ver.)	Nijigasaki High School Idol Club	November 25, 2022
7	"Just Believe!!! (12 Members Ver.)" (Just Believe!!!（12人Ver.))	Nijigasaki High School Idol Club	December 23, 2022
OVA
	"Waku Waku! Monday Morning"	Kasumi Nakasu (Mayu Sagara), Shizuku Osaka (Kaori Maeda), Rina Tennoji (Chiemi Tanaka), & Shioriko Mifune (Moeka Koizumi)	June 23, 2023
The Movie: Final Chapter Part 1
	"Poka Poka Biyori" (Poka Poka 日和)	Ayumu Uehara (Aguri Ōnishi), Ai Miyashita (Natsumi Murakami), Setsuna Yuki (Coco Hayashi), & Lanzhu Zhong (Akina Homoto)	January 29, 2025
The Movie: Final Chapter Part 2
	"Coro Coro Lovely Time!!!" (CORO CORO ラブリーTIME!!!)	Karin Asaka (Miyu Kubota), Kanata Konoe (Akari Kito), Emma Verde (Maria Sashide), & Mia Taylor (Shu Uchida)	March 25, 2026

=== Extended plays (EPs) ===
Title	Artist(s)	Release date	Track listing	Peak Oricon chart positions	Notes
Doko ni Ite mo Kimi wa Kimi (どこにいても君は君)	Nijigasaki High School Idol Club	September 25, 2024	6 tracks: 1. "Rise Up High!" by Shizuku Osaka; 2. "Daydream Mermaid" by Kanata Konoe; 3. "Cara Tesoro" by Emma Verde; 4. "Phoenix" by Lanzhu Zhong; 5. "Stellar Stream" by Ayumu Uehara; 6. "Doko ni Ite mo Kimi wa Kimi" (どこにいても君は君)	7	Nijigasaki High School Idol Club's 1st mini album, containing the theme songs for Love Live! Nijigasaki High School Idol Club The Movie Final Chapter Part 1. Divided into 6 jacket types.
Yakusoku ni Nare Bokura no Uta (約束になれ僕らの歌)	Nijigasaki High School Idol Club	November 8, 2025	7 tracks: 1. "Itoshiki Yume yo Izanaite" (いとしき夢よ いざないて) by Shioriko Mifune; 2. "Cheer Mode" by A.L.A.N; 3. "Like a Treasure" by Mia Taylor; 4. "Stay" by Rina Tennoji; 5. "Burn!!" by Setsuna Yuki; 6. "Circle of Love" by Ai Miyashita; 7. "Yakusoku ni Nare Bokura no Uta" (約束になれ僕らの歌)	14	Nijigasaki High School Idol Club's 2nd mini album, containing the theme songs for Love Live! Nijigasaki High School Idol Club The Movie Final Chapter Part 2. Divided into 6 jacket types.
Nijigaku Flower Music	Nijigasaki High School Idol Club	December 17, 2025	7 tracks: 1. "Viva!" by Rina Tennoji and Shioriko Mifune; 2. "Dizzy Lily Valley" by Ayumu Uehara and Karin Asaka; 3. "Savotina!!" by Setsuna Yuki and Mia Taylor; 4. "Sol de Rosa" by Ai Miyashita and Lanzhu Zhong; 5. "Wondermates" (ワンダーメイツ) by Shizuku Osaka and Kanata Konoe; 6. "Fuwa Fuwari" (ふわふわり) by Kasumi Nakasu and Emma Verde; 7. "Boooooom Boooooom Bee!!"	11	Nijigasaki High School Idol Club's 3rd mini album, containing the theme songs for Nijigasaki High School Idol Club Flower Music Live: Boooooom Boooooom Bee!!. Divided into 6 jacket types.

=== Albums ===
Title	Artist(s)	Release date	Track listing	Peak Oricon chart positions	Notes
Tokimeki Runners	Nijigasaki High School Idol Club	November 21, 2018	10 tracks: 1. "Tokimeki Runners"; 2. "Yume e no Ippo" (夢への一歩) by Ayumu Uehara; 3. "Diamond" (ダイアモンド") by Kasumi Nakasu; 4. "Anata no Risou no Heroine" (あなたの理想のヒロイン) by Shizuku Osaka; 5. "Starlight" by Karin Asaka; 6. "Meccha Going!!" (めっちゃGoing!!) by Ai Miyashita; 7. "Nemureru Mori ni Ikitai na" (眠れる森に行きたいな) by Kanata Konoe; 8. "Chase!" by Setsuna Yuki; 9. "Evergreen" by Emma Verde; 10. "Dokipipo☆Emotion" (ドキピポ☆エモーション) by Rina Tennoji	5	The group's 1st album containing the opening theme song for Love Live! School Idol Festival All Stars. Includes a music video.
Love U My Friends	Nijigasaki High School Idol Club	October 2, 2019	10 tracks: 1. "Kaika Sengen" (開花宣言) by Ayumu Uehara; 2. "☆Wonderland☆" (☆ワンダーランド☆) by Kasumi Nakasu; 3. "Audrey" (オードリー) by Shizuku Osaka; 4. "Wish" by Karin Asaka; 5. "Yu & Ai" (友 & 愛) by Ai Miyashita; 6. "My Own Fairy-Tale" by Kanata Konoe; 7. "Melody" by Setsuna Yuki; 8. "Koe Tsunagou yo" (声繋ごうよ) by Emma Verde; 9. "Tele-Telepathy" (テレテレパシー) by Rina Tennoji; 10. "Love U My Friends"	5	The group's 2nd album
Just Believe!!!	Nijigasaki High School Idol Club	September 2, 2020	12 tracks: 1. "Say Good-Bye Namida" (Say Good-Bye 涙) by Ayumu Uehara; 2. "Margaret" by Kasumi Nakasu; 3. "Yagate Hitotsu no Monogatari" (やがてひとつの物語) by Shizuku Osaka; 4. "Fire Bird" by Karin Asaka; 5. "Tanoshii no Tensai" (楽しいの天才) by Ai Miyashita; 6. "Märchen Star" by Kanata Konoe; 7. "Like It! Love It!" by Setsuna Yuki; 8. "Aion no Uta" (哀温ノ詩) by Emma Verde; 9. "Analog Heart" (アナログハート) by Rina Tennoji; 10. "Ketsui no Hikari" (決意の光) by Mifune Shioriko; 11. "Tokimeki Runners (Chapter 17 ver.)" 12. "Just Believe!!!"	5	The group's 3rd album.
Sound of Tokimeki	Nijigasaki High School Idol Club & Naoki Endo	January 27, 2021		15	Soundtrack album from the anime's first season
L! L! L! (Love the Life We Live)	Nijigasaki High School Idol Club	October 13, 2021	13 tracks: 1. "L! L! L! (Love the Life We Live)"; 2. "Break the System" by Ayumu Uehara; 3. "To Be Yourself" by Kasumi Nakasu; 4. "Ieisa" (イエイ戦サー) by Shizuku Osaka; 5. "Turn It Up!" by Karin Asaka; 6. "Diabolic Mulier" by Ai Miyashita; 7. "Silent Blaze" by Kanata Konoe; 8. "Yada!" (ヤダ！) by Setsuna Yuki; 9. "Itsu Datte for You!" (いつだってfor you!) by Emma Verde; 10. "First Love Again" by Rina Tennoji; 11. "Concentrate!" (コンセントレイト！) by Shioriko Mifune; 12. "Toy Doll" by Mia Taylor; 13. "Ye Mingzhu" (夜明珠（イエミンジュ）) by Lanzhu Zhong	7	The group's 4th album.
Bound for Tokimeki	Nijigasaki High School Idol Club & Naoki Endo	July 13, 2022		8	Soundtrack album from the anime's second season
Fly With You!!	Nijigasaki High School Idol Club	October 4, 2023	13 tracks: 1. "Walking Dream" by Ayumu Uehara; 2. "Senobi Shitatte" (背伸びしたって) by Kasumi Nakasu; 3. "Koakuma Love♡" (小悪魔LOVE♡) by Shizuku Osaka; 4. "My Shadow" by Karin Asaka; 5. "Request for U" by Ai Miyashita; 6. "Cooking With Love" by Kanata Konoe; 7. "Cherry Bomb" (チェリーボム) by Setsuna Yuki; 8. "Koisuru Sunflower" (恋するSunflower) by Emma Verde; 9. "Watashi wa Magnet" (私はマグネット) by Rina Tennoji; 10. "Koufukuron" (咬福論) by Shioriko Mifune; 11. "Lemonade" by Mia Taylor; 12. "5201314" by Lanzhu Zhong; 13. "Fly With You!!"	4	The group's 5th album.
Sangoshou no Kioku (珊瑚礁の記憶)	Nijigasaki High School Idol Club & Naoki Endo	December 4, 2024		15	Soundtrack album from Love Live! Nijigasaki High School Idol Club The Movie Final Chapter Part 1.
Sazameki no Machikado (さざめきの街角)	Nijigasaki High School Idol Club & Naoki Endo	February 4, 2026		TBA	Soundtrack album from Love Live! Nijigasaki High School Idol Club The Movie Final Chapter Part 2.

=== Live concerts and video albums ===
Title	Artist(s)	Concert date(s)	Video release date(s)	Video release format	Peak Oricon chart positions	Notes
Njigasaki High School Idol Club Memorial Box: Blooming Rainbow	Nijigasaki High School Idol Club	November 10, 2018 (Note: Tokimeki Runners release commemoration event: Odaiba Tokimeki Stage, held at DiverCity Tokyo Plaza Festival Square.); March 30, 2019 (Note: School Matching Festival, (校内マッチングフェスティバル, Kōnai Matching Festival) held at Stellar Ball.)	August 21, 2019	BD	3 (BD Memorial Box)	The Blu-ray Disc album which includes the Tokimeki Runners release commemoration event, and the School Matching Festival live performance event.
Nijigasaki High School Idol Club First Live with You	Nijigasaki High School Idol Club	December 14–15, 2019	August 5, 2020	BD	115 (Day 1); 98 (Day 2); 4 (BD Memorial Box)	Nijigasaki's first live concert.
Nijigasaki High School Idol Club 2nd Live!	Nijigasaki High School Idol Club	September 12, 2020 (Brand New Story); September 13, 2020 (Back to the Tokimeki)	March 24, 2021 (Note: The performances of the day stage in Brand New Story were included in bonus discs of anime BDs.)	BD	129 (Day 1); 5 (BD Memorial Box)	Second live concert, with Moeka Koizumi's (Shioriko Mifune) debut. Due to the COVID-19 pandemic, the concerts were held without a live audience, and were only held through a paid online livestream.
Nijigasaki High School Idol Club Shuffle Festival in School	Nijigasaki High School Idol Club	March 20–21, 2021	November 3, 2021	BD	5	Live performance event where each member performed other member's solo songs, which were selected through fan voting.
Nijigasaki High School Idol Club 3rd Live! School Idol Festival	Nijigasaki High School Idol Club	May 9–10, 2021	January 12, 2022	BD	3	Third live concert. Due to it being based on season 1 of the anime series, only the 9 members who appeared in season 1 participated in the concert, alongside Hinaki Yano (Yu Takasaki) who served as a supporting role.
Nijigasaki High School Idol Club Unit Live & Fan Meeting Vol. 1 DiverDiva: Big Bang	DiverDiva	September 11–12, 2021	June 24, 2022 (Note: Day 2 of each Unit Live & Fan Meeting concert was released consecutively in Blu-ray volumes 1-4 for the Love Live! Nijigasaki High School Idol Club anime's second season.)	BD	—	DiverDiva's first subunit concert and fan meeting.
Nijigasaki High School Idol Club Unit Live & Fan Meeting Vol. 2 Qu4rtz: Sweet Cafe	Qu4rtz	October 9–10, 2021	July 27, 2022	BD	—	Qu4rtz's first subunit concert and fan meeting.
Nijigasaki High School Idol Club Unit & Fan Meeting Vol. 3 A・Zu・Na: The Night Before	A・Zu・Na	October 23–24, 2021	August 26, 2022	BD	—	A・Zu・Na's first subunit concert and fan meeting.
Nijigasaki High School Idol Club Unit Live & Fan Meeting Vol. 4 R3birth: First Delight	R3birth	January 22–23, 2022	September 28, 2022	BD	—	R3birth's first subunit concert and fan meeting.
Nijigasaki High School Idol Club 4th Live! Love the Life We Live (Note: Held at Kyocera Dome)	Nijigasaki High School Idol Club	February 26–27, 2022	July 27, 2022	BD	10	Fourth live concert, with Shu Uchida (Mia Taylor) and Akina Houmoto's (Lanzhu Zhong) numbered concert debuts. (Note: Uchida and Houmoto's franchise debuts were in Love Live! Series Presents Countdown Love Live! 2021→2022: Live with a Smile!, while their subunit debuts were in Nijigasaki High School Idol Club Unit Live & Fan Meeting Vol. 4 R3birth: First Delight.)
Nijigasaki High School Idol Club 5th Live! Where the Rainbow Blooms (Note: Held at Tokyo Garden Theater & Musashino Forest Sport Plaza.)	Nijigasaki High School Idol Club	September 10–11, 2022 (Colorful Dreams! Colorful Smiles!); September 17–18, 2022 (Next Tokimeki)	March 22, 2023	BD	3	Fifth live concert. This was Tomori Kusunoki's (Setsuna Yuki) final appearance in a numbered concert. (Note: Kusunoki later stepped down from her role as Setsuna Yuki on March 31, 2023, following her diagnosis with Ehler-Danlos syndrome. Her final concert appearance as Setsuna Yuki would later be at Nijigasaki High School Idol Club Unit Live! A・Zu・Na Lagoon on February 4–5, 2023.)
Nijigasaki High School Idol Club Unit Live! R3birth R3volution	R3birth	January 14–15, 2023	October 18, 2023	BD	4	R3birth's second subunit concert.
Nijigasaki High School Idol Club Unit Live! A・Zu・Na Lagoon	A・Zu・Na	February 4–5, 2023	October 18, 2023	BD	4	A・Zu・Na's second subunit concert.
Nijigasaki High School Idol Club Unit Live! DiverDiva Galactic Trip	DiverDiva	February 25–26, 2023	October 18, 2023	BD	4	DiverDiva's second subunit concert.
Nijigasaki High School Idol Club Unit Live! Qu4rtz Fluffy Magic	Qu4rtz	March 18–19, 2023	October 18, 2023	BD	4	Qu4rtz's second subunit concert.
Nijigasaki High School Idol Club 6th Live! I Love You ⇆ You Love Me (Note: Held at Aichi Sky Expo Hall A & K-Arena Yokohama.)	Nijigasaki High School Idol Club	December 23–24, 2023 (Aichi); January 13–14, 2024 (Yokohama)	July 31, 2024	BD	6	Sixth live concert, with Coco Hayashi's (Setsuna Yuki) debut. (Note: Hayashi assumed the role of Setsuna Yuki on April 1, 2023, following Tomori Kusunoki's departure.)
Nijigasaki High School Idol Club 7th Live! New Tokimeki Land (Note: Held at K-Arena Yokohama.)	Nijigasaki High School Idol Club	October 19–20, 2024	June 18, 2025	BD	9	Seventh live concert.
Nijigasaki High School Idol Club Flower Music Live: Boooooom Boooooom Bee!! (Note: Held at Keio Arena Tokyo.)	Nijigasaki High School Idol Club	January 17–18, 2026	July 1, 2026	BD	TBA	Special "Flower Music" live concert.
Nijigasaki High School Idol Club 8th Live! Tokimeki Express (Note: Held at Osaka-jo Hall and Keio Arena Tokyo.)	Nijigasaki High School Idol Club	June 6–7, 2026 (Osaka); June 13–14, 2026 (Tokyo)	TBA	TBA	TBA	Eighth live concert.

== Love Live! Superstar!! ==
Liella! discography
- Studio albums: 3
- EPs: 1
- Soundtrack albums: 2
- Compilation albums: 3
- Singles: 31
- Music videos: 5
- Blu-ray Disc original CDs: 9
- Live concerts: 6

=== Singles ===
Title	Artist(s)	Release date	Peak Oricon chart positions	Notes
"Hajimari wa Kimi no Sora" (始まりは君の空, The Beginning Is Your Sky)	Liella!	April 7, 2021	2	Liella!'s debut single, released in two versions.
"Start!! True Dreams"	Liella!	July 21, 2021	6	Anime series opening theme
"Mirai wa Kaze no Yō ni" (未来は風のように, The Future Is A Gust of Wind)	Liella!	August 4, 2021	6	Anime series ending theme
"Mirai Yohō Hallelujah!" (未来予報ハレルヤ！, Future Forecast Hallelujah!) / "Tiny Stars"	Liella!	August 25, 2021	6	Anime insert songs, each released in two versions.
"Tokonatsu☆Sunshine" (常夏☆サンシャイン) / "Wish Song"	Liella!	September 29, 2021	4	Anime insert songs, each released in two versions.
"Nonfiction!!" (ノンフィクション!!) / "Starlight Prologue"	Liella!	October 20, 2021	3	Anime insert songs, each released in two versions.
"Hot Passion!"	Sunny Passion	February 2, 2022	6	Insert songs from anime first season sung by Sunny Passion
"Crescendo Yu-ra" (クレッシェンドゆ・ら, Wavering crescendo)	Keke Tang (Liyuu), Ren Hazuki (Nagisa Aoyama)	February 25, 2022	—	Released as bonus CDs for those who bought the Love Live! Superstar!! Blu-ray Discs from Rakuten Books, A-on Store, Sofmap x Animaga, Animate, and Gamers respectively.
"Sagashite! Future" (探して！Future, Search for it! Future)	Liella!	February 25, 2022	—	Released as bonus CDs for those who bought the Love Live! Superstar!! Blu-ray Discs from Rakuten Books, A-on Store, Sofmap x Animaga, Animate, and Gamers respectively.
"Kawaranai Subete" (変わらないすべて, Everything remains the same)	Kanon Shibuya (Sayuri Date), Chisato Arashi (Nako Misaki)	February 25, 2022	—	Released as bonus CDs for those who bought the Love Live! Superstar!! Blu-ray Discs from Rakuten Books, A-on Store, Sofmap x Animaga, Animate, and Gamers respectively.
"Happy To Do Wa!"	Keke Tang (Liyuu), Sumire Heanna (Naomi Payton), Ren Hazuki (Nagisa Aoyama)	February 25, 2022	—	Released as bonus CDs for those who bought the Love Live! Superstar!! Blu-ray Discs from Rakuten Books, A-on Store, Sofmap x Animaga, Animate, and Gamers respectively.
"Stella"	Kanon Shibuya (Sayuri Date), Chisato Arashi (Nako Misaki), Sumire Heanna (Naomi Payton)	February 25, 2022	—	Released as bonus CDs for those who bought the Love Live! Superstar!! Blu-ray Discs from Rakuten Books, A-on Store, Sofmap x Animaga, Animate, and Gamers respectively.
"We Will!"	Liella!	August 3, 2022	4	Anime second season opening theme
"Oikakeru Yume no Saki de" (追いかける夢の先で, Beyond the Dream We Chase)	Liella!	August 10, 2022	2	Anime second season ending theme
"Welcome to Bokura no Sekai" (Welcome to 僕らのセカイ, Welcome to Our World) / "Go!! Restart" (Go!! リスタート)	Liella!	August 17, 2022	3	Anime second season insert songs, each released in two versions.
"Vitamin Summer!" (ビタミンSUMMER！) / "Chance Day, Chance Way!"	Liella!	September 21, 2022	5	Anime second season insert songs, each released in two versions.
"Sing! Shine! Smile!" / "Mirai no Oto ga Kikoeru" (未来の音が聴こえる, I Can Hear The Sound Of The Future)	Liella!	October 19, 2022	8	Anime second season insert songs, each released in two versions.
"Butterfly Wing" / "Edelstein" (エーデルシュタイン)	Wien Margarete (Yuina)	November 30, 2022	18	Anime second season insert songs by Wien Margarete
"Miracle New Story"	Liella!	May 17, 2023	7	Theme song for Love Live! School Idol Festival 2: Miracle Live!
"Universe!!"	Liella!	July 2023 (with Liella! Club CD Set 2023) (Note: Liella! Club CD Set 2023 had no specific release date. It was scheduled to begin shipment to Liella! Club members by July 5, 2023, though it shipped earlier for some.) August 2, 2023 (digital streaming)	—	Theme song for Liella! Club 2023. Contains solo mixes for each member.
"Shekira☆☆☆" (シェキラ☆☆☆, Shake It Up☆☆☆)	Liella!	January 10, 2024	1	Theme song for Liella! 5th LoveLive! Twinkle Triangle
"Distortion" (ディストーション)	CatChu!	April 24, 2024	11	CatChu's first single
"Neutral" (ニュートラル)	Kaleidoscore	April 24, 2024	10	Kaleidoscore's first single
"Jellyfish"	5yncri5e!	April 24, 2024	12	5yncri5e!'s first single
"Aikotoba!" (アイコトバ！)	Liella!	July 2024 (with Liella! Club CD Set 2024) (Note: Liella! Club CD Set 2024 had no specific release date. It was scheduled to begin shipment to Liella! Club members by July 26, 2024.) August 1, 2024 (digital streaming)	—	Theme song for Liella! Club 2024. Contains solo mixes for each member.
"Let's Be One"	Liella!	October 23, 2024	7	Anime third season opening theme
"Daisuki Full Power"	Liella!	October 23, 2024	8	Anime third season closing theme
"Bubble Rise" / "Special Color"	Liella!	November 13, 2024	7	Anime third season insert songs, each released in two versions.
"Zettaiteki Lover" (絶対的LOVER, Absolute Lover) / "Dazzling Game"	Liella!	December 11, 2024	6	Anime third season insert songs, each released in two versions.
"Egao no Promise" (笑顔のPromise, Smile Promise) / "Superstar!!" (スーパースター!!)	Liella!	January 8, 2025	4	Anime third season insert songs, each released in two versions.
"Hajimari wa Kimi no Sora 11 Ver." (始まりは君の空 ～11 Ver.～, The Beginning Is Your Sky 11 Ver.)	Liella!	January 15, 2025	9	Anime third season insert song
"Open the G☆te!!!"	Liella!	November 5, 2025	3	Theme song for Liella! 7th LoveLive! Fly! Music World♪

=== Original song CDs ===
BD volume	Title	Artist(s)	Release date
Season 1
1	"Kokoro Kirarara" (心キラララ, A Sparkling Heart)	Kanon Shibuya (Sayuri Date)	September 28, 2021
2	"Oh! Ready Steady Positive" (Oh！レディ・ステディ・ポジティブ)	Keke Tang (Liyuu)	October 27, 2021
3	"Yūki no Kakera" (勇気のカケラ, Fragments of Courage)	Chisato Arashi (Nako Misaki)	November 26, 2021
4	"Heroines☆Runway" (ヒロインズ☆ランウェイ)	Sumire Heanna (Naomi Payton)	December 24, 2021
5	"Reverb" (リバーブ)	Ren Hazuki (Nagisa Aoyama)	January 26, 2022
6	"Tu Tu Tu!" (トゥ トゥ トゥ！)	Liella!	February 25, 2022
Season 2
4	"Hoshizora Monologue"	Kanon Shibuya (Sayuri Date), Keke Tang (Liyuu), Chisato Arashi (Nako Misaki), Sumire Heanna (Naomi Payton), and Ren Hazuki (Nagisa Aoyama)	December 23, 2022
5	"Blooming Dance! Dance!"	Kinako Sakurakoji (Nozomi Suzuhara), Mei Yoneme (Akane Yabushima), Shiki Wakana (Wakana Okuma), and Natsumi Onitsuka (Aya Emori)	January 27, 2023
6	"Including You"	Liella!	February 24, 2023
Season 3
4	"Tsumi Da・Yo・Ne" (罪DA・YO・NE)	Mei Yoneme (Akane Yabushima) and Shiki Wakana (Wakana Okuma)	March 26, 2025
5	"Omoware Marionette" (想われマリオネット)	Kanon Shibuya (Sayuri Date), Chisato Arashi (Nako Misaki), Ren Hazuki (Nagisa Aoyama), Natsumi Onitsuka (Aya Emori), and Wien Margarete (Yuina),	April 23, 2025
6	"Teenage・Loneliness" (ティーンエイジ・ロンリネス)	Keke Tang (Liyuu), Sumire Heanna (Naomi Payton), Kinako Sakurakoji (Nozomi Suzuhara), and Tomari Onitsuka (Sakura Sakakura)	May 28, 2025

=== Extended plays (EPs) ===
Title	Artist(s)	Release date	Track listing	Peak Oricon chart positions	Notes
Jump Into the New World	Liella!	August 2, 2023	7 tracks: 1. "Jump Into the New World"; 2. "Alternate" (オルタネイト) by CatChu!; 3. "Kage Asobi" (影遊び) by CatChu!; 4. "Velour" (ベロア) by Kaleidoscore; 5. "Fukashi na Blue" (不可視なブルー) by Kaleidoscore; 6. "Dancing Raspberry" by 5yncri5e!; 7. "A Little Love" by 5yncri5e!	9	Liella!'s 1st unit mini-album

=== Albums ===
Title	Artist(s)	Release date	Track listing	Peak Oricon chart positions	Notes
Liella no Uta (リエラのうた)	Liella!	October 27, 2021	12 tracks: 1. "Primary"; 2. "Memories" by Kanon Shibuya; 3. "Memories" by Chisato Arashi; 4. "Anniversary" by Keke Tang; 5. "Anniversary" by Ren Hazuki; 6. "Message" by Sumire Heanna; 7. "Message" by Kanon Shibuya; 8. "Ringing!" by Chisato Arashi; 9. "Ringing!" by Keke Tang; 10. "Dears" by Ren Hazuki; 11. "Dears" by Sumire Heanna; 12. "Departure"	14	A compilation of the Songs of Liella! featured in the anime series
Dreams of the Superstar	Yoshiaki Fujisawa; Liella!	October 27, 2021		19	Soundtrack from the first season of the anime series
What a Wonderful Dream!!	Liella!	March 2, 2022	10 tracks: 1. "Start!! True Dreams"; 2. "What a Wonderful Dream!!"; 3. "Mizuiro no Sunday" (水色のSunday) by Keke Tang; 4. "Flyer's High" by Chisato Arashi; 5. "Mitero!" (みてろ！) Sumire Heanna; 6. "Hajimari wa Kimi no Sora" (始まりは君の空); 7. "Binetsu no Waltz" (微熱のワルツ) by Ren Hazuki; 8. "Aozora o Matteru" (青空を待ってる) by Kanon Shibuya; 9. "Mirai wa Kaze no You ni" (未来は風のように); 10. "Unison" (ユニゾン)	3	Liella!'s 1st album
Liella no Uta 2 (リエラのうた2)	Liella!	October 26, 2022	12 tracks: 1. "Dreamer Coaster" by Kanon Shibuya; 2. "Dreamer Coaster" by Kinako Sakurakoji; 3. "Endless Circuit" (エンドレスサーキット) by Keke Tang; 4. "Endless Circuit" (エンドレスサーキット) by Sumire Heanna; 5. "Meikyuu Sanka" (迷宮讃歌) by Ren Hazuki; 6. "Meikyuu Sanka" (迷宮讃歌) by Natsumi Onitsuka; 7. "Prime Adventure" (プライム・アドベンチャー); 8. "Parade wa Itsumo" (迷宮讃歌) by Mei Yoneme; 9. "Parade wa Itsumo" (迷宮讃歌) by Shiki Wakana; 10. "Kakeru Merry-Go-Round" (駆けるメリーゴーランド) by Chisato Arashi; 11. "Kakeru Merry-Go-Round" (駆けるメリーゴーランド) by Kanon Shibuya; 12. "Time to Go"	19	A compilation of the Songs of Liella! featured in the anime series
Twinkle of the Superstar	Yoshiaki Fujisawa; Liella!	October 26, 2022		22	Soundtrack from the second season of the anime series
Second Sparkle	Liella!	March 15, 2023	13 tracks: 1. "We Will!!"; 2. "Second Sparkle"; 3. "Beginners Rock!!" (ビギナーズRock!!) by Kinako Sakurakoji; 4. "Midnight Rhapsody" (ミッドナイトラプソディ) by Ren Hazuki; 5. "Hoshikuzu Cruising" (星屑クルージング) by Keke Tang; 6. "Kimi o Omou Hana ni Naru" (君を想う花になる) by Chisato Arashi; 7. "Akane Gokoro" (茜心) by Mei Yoneme; 8. "Glass Ball Rejection" (ガラスボールリジェクション) by Shiki Wakana; 9. "Eye o Choudai" (Eyeをちょうだい) by Natsumi Onitsuka; 10. "Starry Prayer" by Sumire Heanna; 11. "Free Flight" by Kanon Shibuya; 12. "Watashi no Symphony 2022 Ver." (私のSymphony ～2022Ver.～); 13. "Oikakeru Yume no Saki de" (追いかける夢の先で)	3	Liella!'s 2nd album
Liella no Uta 3 (リエラのうた3)	Liella!	January 29, 2025	6 tracks: 1. "Dolce" by Wien Margarete; 2. "Dolce" by Tomari Onitsuka; 3. "Summer Escape!!" by Kinako Sakurakoji, Mei Yoneme, Shiki Wakana and Natsumi Onitsuka; 4. "11th Moon" by Wien Margarete and Tomari Onitsuka; 5. "Hitohira Dake" (ひとひらだけ) by Kanon Shibuya, Keke Tang, Chisato Arashi, Sumire Heanna and Ren Hazuki; 6. "Musubu Melody" (結ぶメロディ)	12	A compilation of the Songs of Liella! featured in the anime series
The Beginning of the Superstar	Yoshiaki Fujisawa; Liella!	February 5, 2025		8	Soundtrack from the third season of the anime series
Aspire	Liella!	May 28, 2025 June 4, 2025 (digital streaming)	14 tracks: 1. "Let's Be One"; 2. "Over Over" by Kanon Shibuya; 3. "Sky Linker" by Mei Yoneme; 4. "Lilia" by Shiki Wakana; 5. "Tekuteku Biyori" (てくてく日和) by Kinako Sakurakoji; 6. "Wildcard" (ワイルドカード) by Tomari Onitsuka; 7. "Fundamental" (ファンダメンタル) by Keke Tang; 8. "Just Woo!!" by Sumire Heanna; 9. "Pastel Collage" (パステルコラージュ) by Natsumi Onitsuka; 10. "Musubiba" (結び葉) by Ren Hazuki; 11. "Luca" (ルカ) by Wien Margarete; 12. "Rhythm" by Chisato Arashi; 13. "Aspire"; 14. "Daisuki Full Power"	6	Liella!'s 3rd album

=== Live concerts and video albums ===
Title	Artist(s)	Concert date(s)	Video release date(s)	Format	Peak Oricon chart positions
Liella! First Love Live! Tour ~Starlines~ (Note: Held at Beisia Culture Hall, Kurashiki City Auditorium, Manamiru Iwamizawa City Hall, Orix Theater, Line Cube Shibuya, Kitakyushu Soleil Hall, NTK Hall, Hall of the Forest 21, Phoenix Plaza, Sendai Sun Plaza Hall & Tokyo Garden Theater.)	Liella	October 30–31, 2021 (Gunma); November 6–7, 2021 (Okayama); November 14–15, 2021 (Hokkaido); November 20–21, 2021 (Osaka); November 25–26, 2021 (Tokyo); December 4–5, 2021 (Fukuoka); December 11–12, 2021 (Aichi); December 17–18, 2021 (Chiba); December 25–26, 2021 (Fukui); January 8–9, 2022 (Miyagi); January 15–16, 2022 (Tokyo)	July 6, 2022	BD	8 (BD Memorial Box); 15 (Tokyo Additional Performance)
Liella! 2nd Love Live! ～What a Wonderful Dream!!～ (Note: Held at Pia Arena MM, Nippon Gaishi Hall & Osaka-Jo Hall.)	Liella	March 12–13, 2022 (Yokohama); April 2–3, 2022 (Nagoya); June 4–5, 2022 (Osaka)	January 18, 2023	BD	11
Liella! Live & Fan Meeting Tour ~Welcome to Yuigaoka!!~ (Note: Held at Orix Theater, Tokyo Garden Theater & NTK Hall.)	Liella	June 11–12, 2022 (Osaka); June 18–19, 2022 (Tokyo); June 25–26, 2022 (Nagoya)	TBA	TBA	TBA
Liella! 3rd Love Live! Tour: We Will!! (Note: Held at Xebio Arena Sendai, Aichi Sky Expo Hall A, Makuhari Messe International Exhibition Center, Hokkai Kitayell, Osaka-Jo Hall, Musashino Forest Sport Plaza & Belluna Dome.)	Liella	December 3–4, 2022 (Miyagi); December 10–11, 2022 (Aichi); January 7–8, 2023 (Chiba); January 13–14, 2023 (Hokkaido); January 21–22, 2023 (Osaka); January 28–29, 2023 (Chofu); March 4–5, 2023 (Saitama)	October 4, 2023	BD	4
Liella! 4th Love Live! Tour: Brand New Sparkle (Note: Held at Makuhari Messe International Exhibition Center, Nagoya International Exhibition Hall & Musashino Forest Sport Plaza.)	Liella	August 19–20, 2023 (Kaleidoscore Edition, Chiba); August 26–27, 2023 (CatChu! Edition, Aichi); September 9–10, 2023 (5yncri5e! Edition, Chofu)	May 15, 2024	BD	4
Liella! 5th Love Live! Twinkle Triangle (Note: Held at West Japan General Exhibition Center & Musashino Forest Sport Plaza.)	Liella	January 20–21, 2024 (Fukuoka); February 10–11, 2024 (Tokyo)	September 18, 2024	BD	10
Liella! 6th Love Live! Tour: Let's Be One (Note: Held at Yoyogi National Gymnasium, Aichi Sky Expo, Sekisui Heim Super Arena, Marine Messe Fukuoka & Osaka-jo Hall.)	Liella	March 8–9, 2025 (Shibuya); March 22–23, 2025 (Aichi); April 19–20, 2025 (Rifu); May 3–4, 2025 (Hakata-ku); June 13–14, 2025 (Osaka)	TBA	TBA	TBA

== Link! Like! Love Live! ==
Hasunosora Girls' High School Idol Club discography
- Studio albums: 2
- EPs: 2
- Singles: 30
- Live concerts: 5

=== Singles ===
Title	Artist(s)	Release date	Peak Oricon chart positions	Notes
"Reflection in the Mirror"	Cerise Bouquet	April 26, 2023	18	Cerise Bouquet's first single. Includes three songs by the subunit.
"Sparkly Spot"	Dollchestra	April 26, 2023	19	Dollchestra's first single. Includes three songs by the subunit.
"Holiday∞Holiday" / "Tragic Drops"	Cerise Bouquet & Dollchestra	June 14, 2023	7	Split single by Cerise Bouquet and Dollchestra.
"Genyou Yakou" (眩耀夜行, Dazzling Night Travel)	Cerise Bouquet	August 9, 2023	9	Cerise Bouquet's second single.
"Mirage Voyage"	Dollchestra	August 9, 2023	13	Dollchestra's second single.
"Sugao no Pixel" (素顔のピクセル, True Face Pixel)	Cerise Bouquet	November 15, 2023	12	Cerise Bouquet's third single.
"Take It Over"	Dollchestra	November 22, 2023	10	Dollchestra's third single.
"Identity" (アイデンティティ)	Mira-Cra Park!	November 29, 2023	12	Mira-Cra Park!'s first single.
"Link to the Future"	Hasunosora Girls' High School Idol Club	January 17, 2024	4	Hasunosora Girls' High School Idol Club's first single.
"Special Thanks" / "Ao to Shabon" (青とシャボン, Blue and Soap) / "Milk" (ミルク)	Cerise Bouquet; Dollchestra; Mira-Cra Park!	February 14, 2024	3	Split single by Cerise Bouquet, Dollchestra, and Mira-Cra Park!
"Colorfulness" / "Happy Shijou Shugi!" (ハッピー至上主義!, Happy Supremacy!) / "Pleasure Feather"	Rurino to Yukai na Tsuzuri-tachi (るりのとゆかいなつづりたち) (Note: Rurino Osawa (Kanna Kan) and Tsuzuri Yugiri (Kotoko Sasaki)); KahoMegu♡Gelato (かほめぐ♡じぇらーと) (Note: Kaho Hinoshita (Nozomi Nirei) and Megumi Fujishima (Kona Tsukine)); Hasu no Kyuujitsu (蓮ノ休日) (Note: Sayaka Murano (Kokona Nonaka) and Kozue Otomune (Niina Hanamiya))	March 20, 2024	5	Shuffle unit split single.
"Ishin☆Denshin" (以心☆電信, Telepathy☆Communication)	Mira-Cra Park!	March 27, 2024	3	Mira-Cra Park!'s second single.
"Dakishimeru Hanabira" (抱きしめる花びら, Embracing Petals)	Hasunosora Girls' High School Idol Club	April 3, 2024	4	Hasunosora Girls' High School Idol Club's second single.
"Bloom the Smile, Bloom the Dream!"	Hasunosora Girls' High School Idol Club	July 17, 2024	3	Hasunosora Girls' High School Idol Club's third single.
"Tsukuyomi Kurage" (月夜見海月, Moon Jellyfish)	Cerise Bouquet	September 4, 2024	3	Cerise Bouquet's fourth single.
"Proof"	Dollchestra	September 11, 2024	7	Dollchestra's fourth single.
"Fanfare!!!" (ファンファーレ!!!)	Mira-Cra Park!	October 2, 2024	4	Mira-Cra Park!'s third single.
"Hanamusubi" (ハナムヅビ, Rosette) / "Birdcage" (ビアドケージ) / "Joushou Kiryuu" (ジョーショーキリュー, Updraft)	Cerise Bouquet; Dollchestra; Mira-Cra Park!	December 4, 2024	10	Second split single by Cerise Bouquet, Dollchestra, and Mira-Cra Park!
"Key of Like!"	Hasunosora Girls' High School Idol Club	February 5, 2025	2	Hasunosora Girls' High School Idol Club's fourth single.
"Aurora Flower"	Hasunosora Girls' High School Idol Club	February 26, 2025	7	Hasunosora Girls' High School Idol Club's fifth single.
"Yume Wazurai" (ユメワズライ, Dream Sickness)	Cerise Bouquet	March 19, 2025	6	Cerise Bouquet's fifth single.
"Compass"	Dollchestra	March 19, 2025	7	Dollchestra's fifth single.
"Zenhoui Kyun♡" (全方位キュン♡, Love In Every Direction♡)	Mira-Cra Park!	March 19, 2025	4	Mira-Cra Park!'s fourth single.
"Itsudemo, Itsumademo" (いつでも、いつまでも)	Hasunosora Girls' High School Idol Club	April 9, 2025	7	Hasunosora Girls' High School Idol Club's sixth single.
"Dream Believers(105th Ver.)" (Dream Believers(105期Ver.))	Hasunosora Girls' High School Idol Club	April 30, 2025	5	Hasunosora Girls' High School Idol Club's sixth single.
"Retrofuture"	Edel Note	May 21, 2025	TBA	Edel Note's first single.
TBA	Hasunosora Girls' High School Idol Club	July 2, 2025	TBA	Hasunosora Girls' High School Idol Club's seventh single.
TBA	Hasunosora Girls' High School Idol Club	July 9, 2025	TBA	Hasunosora Girls' High School Idol Club's eighth single.
TBA	Cerise Bouquet	August 20, 2025	TBA	Cerise Bouquet's sixth single.
TBA	Dollchestra	August 20, 2025	TBA	Dollchestra's sixth single.

=== Extended plays (EPs) ===
Title	Artist(s)	Release date	Track listing	Peak Oricon chart positions	Notes
Dream Believers	Hasunosora Girls' High School Idol Club	March 29, 2023	6 tracks: 1. "Dream Believers"; 2. "On Your Mark"; 3. "Suisai Sekai" (水彩世界, Watercolor World) by Cerise Bouquet; 4. "Awoke" by Dollchestra; 5. "Do! Do! Do!" (ド!ド!ド!) by Mira-Cra Park!; 6. "Eien no Euphoria" (永遠のEuphoria, Eternal Euphoria)	5	The group's debut mini-album.
Dream Believers (104th Ver.) (Dream Believers(104期Ver.))	Hasunosora Girls' High School Idol Club	April 17, 2024	6 tracks: 1. "Dream Believers (104th Ver.)" (Dream Believers(104期 Ver.)); 2. "On Your Mark (104th Ver.)" (On Your Mark(104期 Ver.)); 3. "Aoku Haruka" (アオクハルカ, Far-Off Blue) by Cerise Bouquet; 4. "Ladybug" (レディバグ) by Dollchestra; 5. "Mira-Creation" (みらくりえーしょん) by Mira-Cra Park!; 6. "Eien no Euphoria (104th Ver.)" (永遠のEuphoria (104期 Ver.), Eternal Euphoria (104th Ver.))	5	The group's second mini-album, and the first to include members Ginko Momose (Sakurai Hina), Kosuzu Kachimachi (Fuku Hayama), and Hime Anyoji (Rin Kurusu).

=== Albums ===
Title	Artist(s)	Release date	Track listing	Peak Oricon chart positions	Notes
Natsumeki Pain (夏めきペイン, Summery Pain)	Hasunosora Girls' High School Idol Club	September 20, 2023	10 tracks: 1. "Natsumeki Pain" (夏めきペイン, Summery Pain); 2. "Yup! Yup! Yup!"; 3. "Kokon Touzai" (ココン東西, All Eras and Countries) by Mira-Cra Park!; 4. "Zanyou" (残陽, Setting Sun) by Cerise Bouquet; 5. "Seishun no Rinkaku" (青春の輪郭, Outline of Youth) by Dollchestra; 6. "Hakuchuu à la Mode" (ハクチューアラモード, Midday à la Mode) by Mira-Cra Park!; 7. "Dear my future" by Cerise Bouquet; 8. "Parallel Dancer" (パラレルダンサー) by Dollchestra; 9. "Asu no Sora no Bokutachi e" (明日の空の僕たちへ, To Our Sky of Tomorrow); 10. "Legato"	7	The group's debut album.
Oideyo! Ishikawa Dai Kankō (おいでよ!石川大観光, Come Here! Ishikawa Tourism)	Hasunosora Girls' High School Idol Club	March 26, 2025	7 tracks: 1. "Oideyo! Ishikawa Dai Kankō" (おいでよ!石川大観光, Come Here! Ishikawa Tourism); 2. "Koigeshiki Shouwa Roman" (恋景色昭和ロマン, Love Scenery Showa Romance) by Cerise Bouquet; 3. "Veggie・Love・Roux" (ベジ・ラブ・ルー) by Dollchestra; 4. "Mahara Jamboree II" (マハラジャンボリーⅡ) by Mira-Cra Park!; 5. "Haji wa Jinsei no Kakisute" (恥は人生のかきすて, Shame is the Stirring Up of Life) by Ginko Momose, Kosuzu Kachimachi and Hime Anyoji; 6. "Love it! Wonderful Trip!" by Kaho Hinoshita, Sayaka Murano and Rurino Osawa; 7. "Asterism" (アステリズム) by Kozue Otomune, Tsuzuri Yuguri and Megumi Fujishima	TBA	Special album.

=== Live concerts and video albums ===
Title	Artist(s)	Concert date(s)	Video release date(s)	Format	Peak Oricon chart positions
Hasunosora Girls' High School Idol Club Opening Live Event: Bloom the Dream	Hasunosora Girls' High School Idol Club	June 4, 2023	TBA	TBA	TBA
Hasunosora Girls' High School Idol Club 1st Live Tour: Run! Can! Fun! (Note: Held at West Japan General Exhibition Center, Musashino Forest Sport Plaza & Aichi Sky Expo Hall A.)	Hasunosora Girls' High School Idol Club	October 21–22, 2023 (Fukuoka); November 18–19, 2023 (Tokyo); November 25–26, 2023 (Aichi)	October 16, 2024	BD	5
Hasunosora Girls' High School Idol Club 2nd Live Tour: Blooming with ○○○ (Note: Held at Makuhari Messe International Exhibition Hall 1-3 & World Memorial Hall.)	Hasunosora Girls' High School Idol Club	April 20–21, 2024 (Chiba); May 18–19, 2024 (Hyogo)	April 23, 2025	BD	9
Hasunosora Girls' High School Idol Club 3rd Live Tour: Try Tri Unity!!! (Note: Held at Tachikawa Stage Garden, Orix Theater, Nagoya Congress Center Century Hall, Ryougoku Kokugikan & Yokohama Arena.)	Mira-Cra Park! Dollchestra; Cerise Bouquet; Hasunosora Girls' High School Idol Club	November 16, 2024 (Mira-Cra Park!, Tokyo); November 24, 2024 (Dollchestra, Osaka); December 1, 2024 (Cerise Bouquet, Nagoya); December 21–22, 2024 (Live & Fan Meeting, Tokyo); January 10–11, 2025 (Hasunosora Girls' High School Idol Club, Yokohama)	August 27, 2025	BD	14
Hasunosora Girls' High School Idol Club 4th Live Dream: Bloom, The Dream Believers (Note: Held at Ishikawa Industrial Exhibition Hall #4, Glion Arena Kobe & K-Arena Yokohama.)	Hasunosora Girls' High School Idol Club	April 26–27, 2025 (Ishikawa), May 31–June 1, 2025 (Hyogo), June 7–8, 2025 (Kanagawa)	TBA	TBA	TBA

== Love Live! Bluebird ==
Ikizurai Club! discography
- Singles: 11

=== Singles ===
Title	Artist(s)	Release date	Peak Oricon chart positions	Notes
"What is My Life?"	Ikizurai Club!	July 30, 2025	11	Ikizurai Club!'s first single.
"Asakusa Guilty Girl no Uta" (浅草Guilty Girlの歌, Asakusa Guilty Girl's Song)	Polka Takahashi (Honon Ayasaki)	August 27, 2025	22	First batch of solo singles.
"Public Style"	Mai Azabu (Rina Endō)	August 27, 2025	20	First batch of solo singles.
"Itsuka Ao" (いつか碧, Someday, Blue-Green)	Akira Gotō (Seiri Miyano)	September 10, 2025	14	First batch of solo singles.
"Hibana" (HIBANA-火花-, Spark)	Hanabi Komagata (Kokoro Fujino)	September 10, 2025	13	First batch of solo singles.
"HomeRun Queen!!"	Miracle Kanazawa (Aiha Sakano)	September 24, 2025	23	First batch of solo singles.
"Koi no One-Time Password" (恋のワンタイムパスワード)	Noriko Chōfu (Ria Seko)	September 24, 2025	19	First batch of solo singles.
"Pray For Love"	Yukuri Harumiya (Yuki Okumura)	October 8, 2025	18	First batch of solo singles.
"Kimi wa Yoru no Polaris" (キミは夜のポラリス)	Aurora Konohana (Akane Amasawa)	October 8, 2025	26	First batch of solo singles.
"Little Green Iinkai" (Little Green委員会)	Midori Yamada (Honoka Motomori)	October 29, 2025	13	First batch of solo singles.
"Ikitakunai Every Day" (イキタクナイevery day)	Shion Sasaki (Aoi Suzunose)	October 29, 2025	14	First batch of solo singles.

== Love Live! franchise ==
=== Singles ===
Title	Artist(s)	Release date	Peak Oricon chart positions	Notes
"Live with a Smile!"	Aqours; Nijigasaki High School Idol Club; Liella!	November 3, 2021	3	Theme song CD for Love Live! Series Presents Countdown Love Live! 2021→2022: Live with a Smile!
"Not Alone Not Hitori / Miracle Stay Tune! (ミラクル STAY TUNE！) / Shooting Voice!!"	Aqours; Nijigasaki High School Idol Club; Liella!	November 24, 2021	3	Tie up songs for the franchise's radio program hosted in All Night Nippon. Each song is sung by each group in order.
"Ijigen Big Bang" (異次元★♥BIGBANG)	Uzuki Shimamura (Ayaka Ohashi), Shizuka Mogami (Azusa Tadokoro), Kogane Tsukioka (Karin Isobe), Chika Takami (Anju Inami), Ayumu Uehara (Aguri Onishi), Kanon Shibuya (Sayuri Date), and Kaho Hinoshita (Nozomi Nirei)	December 6, 2023	5	Theme song CD for Ijigen Fes Idolm@ster Love Live! Uta Gassen, featuring a representative member from all participating Idolmaster and Love Live! groups.
"Bring the Love!"	You Watanabe (Shuka Saitō), Ayumu Uehara (Aguri Onishi), Kanon Shibuya (Sayuri Date), Kaho Hinoshita (Nozomi Nirei), and Honoka Kōsaka (Emi Nitta) (Note: Honoka Kōsaka (Emi Nitta) is credited as a guest singer)	September 20, 2024	5	Theme song CD for Love Live! Series Asia Tour 2024: Minna de Kanaeru Monogatari, featuring a representative member from each group.

=== Albums ===
Title	Artist(s)	Release date	Peak Oricon chart positions	Notes
Ijigen Fes Idolm@ster Love Live! Uta Gassen Live CD (「異次元フェス アイドルマスター★♥ラブライブ!歌合戦」LIVE CD)	Aqours; Nijigasaki High School Idol Club; Liella! School Idol Musical; Hasunosora Girls' High School Idol Club; Cinderella Girls; Million Live! Shiny Colors	August 7, 2024	14	Live concert compilation album from Ijigen Fes Idolm@ster Love Live! Uta Gassen.

=== Live concerts ===
Title	Artist(s)	Concert date(s)	Video release date(s)	Video release format	Peak Oricon chart positions	Notes
Love Live! Series 9th Anniversary: Love Live! Fest	μ's Aqours; Saint Snow; Nijigasaki High School Idol Club (Note: Akari Kitō (Kanata Konoe) was absent on day 2 due to a conflicting schedule.)	January 18–19, 2020	September 9, 2020	BD	2	First franchise-wide concert held in commemoration of Love Live!'s ninth anniversary. It was also μ's' first live concert appearance since μ's Final LoveLive! μ'sic Forever was held in 2016.
Love Live! Series Presents Countdown Love Live! 2021→2022: Live with a Smile!	Aqours; Nijigasaki High School Idol Club; Liella!	December 31, 2021	September 14, 2022	BD	4	Franchise-wide concert held on New Year's Eve.
Ijigen Fes Idolm@ster Love Live! Uta Gassen (異次元フェス アイドルマスター★♥ラブライブ！歌合戦)	Aqours; Nijigasaki High School Idol Club; Liella! School Idol Musical; Hasunosora Girls' High School Idol Club; Cinderella Girls; Million Live! Shiny Colors	December 9–10, 2023	August 7, 2024	BD	2	Franchise-wide concert held in collaboration with The Idolmaster, featuring all active Love Live! groups alongside representatives from Idolmaster's Cinderella Girls, Million Live! & Shiny Colors. Cast members of the School Idol Musical performed as guests.
Love Live! Series Present Unit Koushien 2024 (LoveLive! Series Presents ユニット甲子園 2024)	CYaRon! Azalea (Note: Kanako Takatsuki (Hanamaru Kunikida) was originally scheduled to participate on both days, but cancelled her appearances due to poor health.); Guilty Kiss; YYY; Saint Snow; A・Zu・Na; Qu4rtz (Note: Akari Kitō (Kanata Konoe) was absent on both days. Mayu Sagara (Kasumi Nakasu) only appeared on day 2.); DiverDiva; R3birth (Note: Moeka Koizumi (Shioriko Mifune) only appeared on day 1.); CatChu! Kaleidoscore; 5yncri5e! Sunny Passion; Cerise Bouquet; Dollchestra; Mira-Cra Park!	March 9–10, 2024	November 20, 2024	BD	5	Franchise-wide sub-unit concert. NHK announcer Yasuo Fujii and Hinaki Yano (Yu Takasaki) were the event's MCs.
Love Live! Series Asia Tour 2024: Minna de Kanaeru Monogatari (LoveLive! Series Asia Tour 2024 ～みんなで叶える物語～) (Note: Held at Guangzhou International Sports Arena (Guangzhou), National Exhibition and Convention Center (Shanghai), Zepp New Taipei (Taipei), Korea University Hwajeong Gymnasium (Seoul), & K-Arena Yokohama (Yokohama))	μ's (Note: Present at the Shanghai and Yokohama legs with Emi Nitta (Honoka Kōsaka), Aya Uchida (Kotori Minami), and Pile (Maki Nishikino).); Aqours (Note: Present at the Shanghai, Taipei, and Yokohama legs with Shuka Saitō (You Watanabe), Aika Kobayashi (Yoshiko Tsushima), and Ai Furihata (Ruby Kurosawa).); Nijigasaki High School Idol Club (Note: Present at the Shanghai leg with Mayu Sagara (Kasumi Nakasu), Shu Uchida (Mia Taylor), and Akina Houmoto (Lanzhu Zhong), the Seoul leg with Aguri Ōnishi (Ayumu Uehara), Natsumi Murakami (Ai Miyashita), Coco Hayashi (Setsuna Yuki), Chiemi Tanaka (Rina Tennoji), Moeka Koizumi (Shioriko Mifune), and Shu Uchida (Mia Taylor), and the Yokohama leg with Aguri Ōnishi (Ayumu Uehara), Kaori Maeda (Shizuku Osaka), Miyu Kubota (Karin Asaka), Coco Hayashi (Setsuna Yuki), Maria Sashide (Emma Verde), and Chiemi Tanaka (Rina Tennoji).); Liella! (Note: Present at the Guangzhou, Shanghai, and Yokohama legs.); Hasunosora Girls' High School Idol Club (Note: Present at the Yokohama leg.)	October 4, 2024 (Guangzhou); October 6, 2024 (Shanghai); November 9–10, 2024 (Taipei); December 14–15, 2024 (Seoul); February 1–2, 2025 (Yokohama)	TBA	TBA	TBA	First franchise-wide tour with participation from members of all Love Live! groups.

=== Radio CDs ===
Title	Artist(s)	Release date	Peak Oricon chart positions	Notes
"Ai♡Scream" (愛♡スクリ～ム!)	AiScReam (Note: A subunit with Ayumu Uehara (Aguri Ōnishi) from Nijigasaki High School Idol Club, Shiki Wakana (Wakana Ōkuma) from Liella!, Ceras Yanagida Lilienfeld (Miu Miyake) from Hasunosora Girls' High School Idol Club, and Mai Azabu (Rina Endō) from Ikizurai Club! Ayumu Uehara and Shiki Wakana, alongside Ruby Kurosawa (Ai Furihata) from Aqours, were founding members of the group and its associated radio program. Ceras Yanagida Lilienfeld and Mai Azabu joined in 2026.)	January 22, 2025	7	Theme song CD by the hosts of Love Live!'s radio program on All Night Nippon Gold. First and only release preceding Ruby Kurosawa (Ai Furihata)'s graduation from the unit.
"Next Card"	AiScReam	May 23, 2026 (Digital)	—	Theme song for Love Live! Series Official Card Game. First single to include members Ceras Yanagida Lilienfeld (Miu Miyake) and Mai Azabu (Rina Endō).
