= Ai Scream! =

Love Live! song

- Cover artwork showing Ayumu Uehara (left), Ruby Kurosawa (center), and Shiki Wakana (right)

Single by AiScReam (Note: Consisting of Ai Furihata as Ruby Kurosawa, Aguri Ōnishi as Ayumu Uehara, and Wakana Okuma as Shiki Wakana.)
- Language: Japanese
- B-side: "Ice Limit"
- Released: January 22, 2025
- Genre: Character song; anime song
- Length: 4:22
- Label: Lantis
- Composers: DJ Chika aka Inherit; Hayato Yamamoto
- Lyricist: Aim
- Producer: Ryuichi Okubo

Music video
- "Ai Scream!" on YouTube

Lyric video
- "Ai Scream!" lyric video on YouTube

"Ai Scream!" (Japanese: 愛♡スクリ〜ム！, Hepburn: Ai Sukurimu!) is a song by AiScReam, a Japanese voice actress unit formed by Ai Furihata, Aguri Ōnishi, and Wakana Okuma, as part of the Love Live! media franchise.

Released as the group's debut single on January 22, 2025, by Lantis, the song gained significant popularity both in Japan and worldwide, driven by its viral spread on social media platforms, particularly on TikTok.

== Background and release ==
AiScReam is a Love Live! cross-franchise unit originating from the Nippon Broadcasting System radio program Love Live! Series no All Night Nippon Gold (ラブライブ!シリーズのオールナイトニッポンGOLD). The group brings together voice actresses from different sub-groups from the Love Live! franchise: Ruby Kurosawa (voiced by Ai Furihata) from Aqours, Ayumu Uehara (voiced by Aguri Onishi) from Nijigasaki High School Idol Club, and Shiki Wakana (voiced by Wakana Okuma) from Liella!. This marks the first time a Love Live! unit has featured members from multiple generations of the franchise.

Co-writer Hayato Yamamoto stated that he drew inspiration from the audience energy he witnessed while attending a Love Live! Series concert, commenting: "When I attended one of their concerts, I was blown away by the incredible energy of the audience. Seeing everyone shouting at the top of their lungs and genuinely having the time of their lives right in front of me was unforgettable." Since AiScReam was planned as a limited-time unit, Yamamoto intended for the title track to be easily sung and enjoyed by crowd members even upon their first time hearing it live. About the track's music style, Yamamoto stated: "I was not intentionally trying to adopt specific trends, but I have always been fond of Japanese idol culture, and within pop music, I have always loved that bright, sparkly, "cute" sound (...) [however] "Ai Scream" actually has a pretty heavy beat. While the three cast members' vocals make it sound cute on the surface, the core of the track is quite heavy-hitting—a sort of "sweet & spicy" blend. Whenever I produce music, my fundamental goal is to make something where the beat and bass alone get your body moving." The song's second verse incorporates a call-and-response section featuring the cast members' real-life favorite ice cream flavors, which were surveyed by the producer in advance and chosen based on how well they fit the rhythm. About this section, which would later become vital on the track subsequent vitality, Yamamoto stated: "because that raw live energy [of the Love Live! concert] was such a core foundational experience for me, I could already picture the ideal scene in my head during production—everyone in the venue shouting "Hai!" back and forth together." Yamamoto attributed the song's viral popularity to a combination of elements, including the lyrics by Aim, the distinct vocal qualities of the cast, and particularly the energetic crowd participation captured in live performance videos, adding "If we hadn't had the crowd's voices in that live video which triggered the initial buzz, I do not think it would have caught on to this extent."

"Ai Scream!" was released as the group's first single on January 22, 2025, and was first performed live at a Love Live! series joint concert held on February 1 and 2 in Yokohama. A short video from the performance showing the song's call-and-response segment, was posted on the official Love Live! TikTok account on March 6. Shortly after, it sparked widespread attention, leading to a surge in user-generated content such as lip-sync videos, dance covers, fan animations, and tribute videos across social media platforms.

== Music video ==
The live-action music video for "Ai Scream!" was published on YouTube on August 31, 2025, about six months after the single's original release date. The video was directed by Atsunori Toshi, with choreography in charge of Chami.

== Chart performance ==
"Ai Scream!" debuted at number seven on the Oricon Weekly Singles Chart for the week of February 3, 2025. Additionally, it entered the Billboard Japan Top Singles Sales chart at number eight for the week of January 29, 2025.

On the Billboard Japan Heatseekers Songs Chart, "Ai Scream!" peaked at number one for the week of May 14 (tracking period: May 5–11, 2025). For the week of May 28 (tracking period: May 19–25, 2025), it reclaimed the number one spot, climbing from number two the previous week. This was believed to be influenced by the group's first TV appearance on NHK's program Venue101, which aired on May 24.

Outside of Japan, the song ranked second on the Billboard Japan Global Japan Songs Excl. Japan chart.

== Global impact ==
"Ai Scream!" snippet
The song's call-and-response segment became the subject of viral success on social media platforms, particularly on short-form video sharing sites like TikTok.

The song's popularity extended far beyond Japan, driven by its viral spread on short-form video platforms. On the Billboard Japan Global Japan Songs Excl. Japan chart, "Ai Scream!" peaked at number 3 by May 2025. According to Luminate's music analysis tool Connect, the song saw significant streaming growth in Asia, particularly in South Korea and Thailand, where the Love Live! franchise already had a strong fanbase prior to the song's viral success.

By week 10 (March 7–13, 2025), streaming numbers increased in countries such as Indonesia, the Philippines, Mexico, and Brazil. The song's "memeification" accelerated in Week 12 (March 21–27, 2025), with notable streaming growth in North America and Europe. A key driver of its global success was its adoption by K-pop artists, starting with Ive on March 29, 2025, followed by groups such as Kep1er, BoyNextDoor, Tomorrow X Together, Twice, and Aespa. These artists posted videos featuring the song or performed parts of it live, significantly boosting its visibility. South Korea emerged as the top country for streaming outside Japan by week 14 (April 4–10, 2025), maintaining high streaming numbers for approximately a month.

== Commercial use ==
In June 2025, AiScReam collaborated with McDonald's in Japan for a promotional campaign entitled AiScReam × HiruMac (AiScReam×ひるまック). The collaboration was announced on June 30 via McDonald's Japan's official X account, and incorporated an edited version of the "Ai Scream!" performance video, with lyrics tailored to highlight each member's recommended burger.

== Reception ==
While analyzing the reasons and works behind the viral success of the title track, music critic Aone Komachi compared "Ai Scream!" to "Shikairo Days" (シカ色デイズ, Shikairo Deizu), the opening theme of the TV anime series My Deer Friend Nokotan, "Any Angle" (全方向美少女, Zenhōkō Bishōjo) by Noa, and "Ii Jan" (イイじゃん) by M!LK, identifying a common trait: a melody and phrase that stick in the listener's mind, creating a loop that leads to repeated playback. Komachi identified the combination of "loop × cute × surreal" as a key factor in their viral spread on social media.

== Track listing ==
All lyrics are written by Aim.

"Ai Scream!" - Digital release
No.	Title	Music & Arrangement	Length
1.	"Ai Scream!" (愛♡スクリ～ム!)	DJ Chika a.k.a. Inherit; Hayato Yamamoto	4:22
2.	"Ice Limit"	Hayato Yamamoto	3:44
3.	"Ai Scream!" (Off-vocal)		4:22
4.	"Ice Limit" (Off-vocal)		3:44
Total length:			16:13

"Ai Scream!" - CD single
No.	Title	Length
1.	"Ai Scream!"	4:22
2.	"Amakute Tanoshii AiScReam Radio!" (あまくてたのしい♡AiScReamラジオ!)	14:47
3.	"Ice Limit"	3:46
4.	"Ai Scream!" (Off Vocal)	4:22
5.	"Ice Limit" (Off Vocal)	3:45
Total length:		31:02

== Charts ==
=== Weekly charts ===
Weekly chart performance for "Ai Scream!"
Chart (2025)	Peak position
Global Japan Songs Excl. Japan (Billboard Japan)	2
Japan Top Singles Sales (Billboard Japan)	8
Japan Download Songs (Billboard Japan)	40
Japan Heatseekers Songs (Billboard Japan)	1
Japan (Oricon)	7
Japan Anime Singles (Oricon)	3

=== Monthly charts ===
Monthly chart performance for "Ai Scream!"
Chart (2025)	Position
Japan (Oricon)	26
Japan Anime Singles (Oricon)	8
