= Any Angle =

2024 song by Noa

Single by Noa
- Language: Japanese
- Released: 5 January 2024
- Genre: J-pop
- Length: 2:07
- Songwriter: Noa

"Any Angle" (Note: Official English title) (全方向美少女, Zen Hōkō Bishōjo; lit. "The Beautiful Girl from Every Angle") is a 2024 song by Japanese singer-songwriter Noa. Noa conceived the song by drawing inspiration from TikTok videos, one of which she released the song on in November 2023, before giving it a digital release in January 2024. Played more than 1.9 billion times by October 2024, it received praise for its lyrics, vocals, and social media themes, and generated a TikTok meme where the camera moves in all four directions.

== Composition ==
"Any Angle" is a J-pop song by Noa which draws retro inspiration in its composition and centers on the beauty of girls. Sayako Oki of Rockin'On Japan and Tsuki no Hito of Real Sound described the song as a "self-esteem boosting" one; Further, Tsuki no Hito drew comparisons to HoneyWorks' "Kawaikute Gomen", noting that both songs "serve as a form of armor, donned to survive in a modern era where the gaze of others is constantly made visible". On a UtaTen column, MarSali noted that the chorus, which praises the listeners as an "all-angle beauty" from the front, side, and below, indicates that the listener possess internal beauty instead of superficial external beauty and characterizes the narrator as showing jealousy towards the listener. Oki said that one of the chorus lines, "You're gorgeous from every angle", (Note: 君は全方向美少女) (Note: Translated lyrics are from the official music video.) symbolizes the song's focus on the listener over its narrative.

Noa cited the viral nature of front-camera TikTok videos showing one's own face as an inspiration for "Any Angle". Noa said the song is "dedicated to everyone who refuses to give up on becoming cute or beautiful [and] to everyone who resonates with the track, listens to it, or has filmed videos using it." On the song's social media themes, Rockin'On Japan noted that Noa managed to invoke widespread social media usage to "create pop music that captures the ears of the public living in the present and gives voice to their sentiments".

While most lyrics are Japanese, "Any Angle" has one verse in English, which indicates a attractive, multifaceted beauty that makes her "the fire or ice or sweet sweet dream".

== Release and promotion ==
In November 2023, Noa unveiled the song on a video posted on her TikTok account. "Any Angle" was released on 5 January 2024. The song also received a Korean-language version, released digitally on 28 February. On 25 April, it made its first live concert appearance during Noa's first concert, hosted at WWW in Shibuya.

A music video for "Any Angle", directed by Noa herself, was released on 14 February. A Licca-chan doll also appears in the music video.

Noa performed "Any Angle" on the 28 June 2024 episode of The First Take, with a specialized channel-exclusive band arrangement made for the performance. In October 2024, the song was featured in a commercial for Ito En's Relax Jasmine Tea brand; this was the first time she had a TV commercial tie-in with a company.

== Personnel ==
Credits sourced from Apple Music:

- Vocals, lyricist, and composer: Noa

== Reception and popularity ==
Prior to its 2024 official release, "Any Angle" had been played more than 480 million times. Within a month of its digital release, "Any Angle" received over 1.4 billion TikTok plays, a number that reached 1.9 billion by October. It was also the January 2024 featured song for TikTok and Spotify's Buzz Tracker joint artist-support initiative, and it won a 2024 TikTok First Half of the Year Trend Award in music. Among artists who used the track for their videos were Yua Mikami, K-pop groups NiziU and Twice, and K-pop singer Yuna.

Tsuki no Hito of Real Sound attributed the song's popularity as a background track to "her glossy yet approachable vocals, a catchy melody, and exceptional compatibility with TikTok". MarSali praised the combination of the addictive music and Noa's vocals as a perfect match, and Rockin'On Japan praised the vocals as "both alluring and mysterious" and the lyrics as "catchy". Oki also praised the contrast between the kayokyoku-like music and the "light yet alluring" lyrics, as well as the gimmicks that "allow the track itself to embody beauty from every angle".

"Any Angle" peaked at #81 at the Billboard Japan Hot 100, #69 at the Billboard Japan Streaming Songs, and #56 at the Billboard Japan Download Songs. It also topped Billboard Japan's Heatseekers Songs for the week of 8 to 14 April 2024. The song was also popular outside of Japan, including South Korea.

"Any Angle" generated a TikTok meme in which the camera moves in all four directions alongside the lyrics "From the front, from the side, even from a low angle, You're gorgeous omg". (Note: 正面で見ても横から見ても下から見てもいい女で困っちゃう) Tsuki no Hito praised it as "the perfect track for users who want to highlight their own beauty or cuteness on social media." Commenting on the song's influence on the platform, Noa herself compared it to a prompt for creating TikTok videos.

== Charts ==
=== Weekly charts ===
Weekly chart performance for "Any Angle"
Chart (2024)	Peak position
Japan (Japan Hot 100)	81
Japan (Japan Download)	69
Japan (Japan Streaming)	56
