= Noa (MR8 singer) =

Japanese singer-songwriter (born 2000)

Noa 乃紫
- Born: 2000 (age 25–26)
- Occupation: Singer-songwriter
- Instrument: Vocals
- Years active: 2023–present

Noa (乃紫; born 2000) is a Japanese singer-songwriter represented by the agency MR8. After she made her full-fledged music debut in 2023, her song "Any Angle" became popular on TikTok, and she held two solo concerts that same year. Several of her songs have appeared on Oricon and Billboard Japan's charts, and one of them, "Lose the Frames", was the first opening theme of the 2026 You and I Are Polar Opposites anime.

== Biography ==
Noa was born in 2000. (Note: An October 2025 article gives Noa an age of 25 (which puts her birth in both 1999 and 2000), as does a January 2026 article (which means she would have been born in 2000 or 2001).) As a child, Noa studied piano and violin and played her parents' acoustic guitar as a hobby. While in university, she became deeply immersed in composition after an acquaintance let them try out Logic Pro during their university years. Her full-fledged music career began in 2023, and she signed with agency MR8 that same year. Originally performing under the all-caps stage name NOA, she also adopted a new (and current) kanji-based one.

In January 2024, Noa's song "Any Angle" (全方向美少女) became popular on TikTok, topping the TikTok Weekly Top 20 for two consecutive weeks. After topping at #23 at the Billboard Japan Hot 100 Composers chart on 17 January 2024, she reached #31 at the Billboard Music Japan Artist 100 chart and #24 at the Billboard Music Hot 100 Lyricists chart. She held her first solo concert at WWW in Shibuya on 25 April 2024; she later held another solo show that same year, Noa 2nd One Man Live. Later that year, she released "Color of Our Destiny" (縁色反応), the opening theme of the MBS drama Hello, Nice to Meet You. Let's Get Divorced., and "Don't Stare at Me for 8 Seconds" (恋の8秒ルール), the theme for the Please Excuse My Younger Brothers live-action film.

In 2025, Noa released several media tie-in songs: (Note: English titles are from YouTube Music) "Something About Kiss" (接吻の手引き), the theme song for the ABC drama Love Revolution; "We Don't Need Heroes" (ヒロインになるまでは), the tie-in song for Nippon TV short drama series Mainichi Hanikamu Bokutachi wa; "Snipe the Heart" (銃口をハートに向けて), the insert song of the A Girl & Her Guard Dog film; and "A Music Score" (透明の楽譜), the theme song for the film 80-nen-go no Anata e. She also performed the song "Lose the Frames", the first opening theme of the 2026 You and I Are Polar Opposites anime; this was the first time she performed a theme song for the anime television series. In January 2026, she made her first live appearance in Malaysia, performing at Anime Fantasia. In May 2026, she released "Ikujinashi", remade from one of the songs she produced during college.

According to TuneCore, Noa "self-produces every aspect of her work, including lyrics, composition, arrangement, vocals, and artwork". In an interview with music journalist Tomonori Shiba, she cited Radwimps, Sheena Ringo, and Tokyo Jihen as influences. Rockin'on stated in a 2024 article that her music shifted from centering on her personal ego to issues centered on general audiences.

== Discography ==
Title	Year	Peak chart positions						
Title	Year	JPN Cmb.	JPN Dig.	JPN Str.	JPN Hot	JPN DL	JPN Str. (B)	JPN HS
"Any Angle" (全方向美少女)	2024	—	—	—	81	56	69	—
"My Lovely Killer" (初恋キラー)	2024	21	36	12	17	31	12	—
"1000 Days of Moments" (1000日間)	2025	46	—	39	34	86	35	20
"Lose the Frames" (メガネを外して)	2026	—	46	—	—	48	—	—
"—" denotes releases that did not chart or were not released in that region.
