= Wakana Okuma =

Japanese voice actress (born 2001)

- 大熊 和奏
- Born: April 13, 2001 (age 25); Saitama Prefecture, Japan
- Occupations: Voice actress; singer
- Years active: 2021–present
- Agent: Ken Production
- Notable work: Love Live! Superstar!! as Shiki Wakana
- Height: 156 cm (5 ft 1 in)
- Musical career
- Also known as: Spileben
- Genres: J-pop; anime song
- Instrument: Vocals
- Years active: 2022–present

Wakana Okuma (大熊 和奏, Ōkuma Wakana, born April 13, 2001) is a Japanese voice actress and singer currently affiliated with Ken Production. She is best-known for her role as Shiki Wakana, member of fictional idol group Liella! in the Love Live! Superstar!! media franchise. In late 2024, she launched her solo music project under the name Spileben.

== Biogragrphy ==
=== Early life ===
Born in Saitama Prefecture, Okuma developed an early interest in performance arts, beginning jazz dance at the age of five. Influenced by her teacher’s love for the J-pop group Arashi, she performed creative dances to their music. After a brief hiatus following her teacher’s departure during her elementary school years, Okuma resumed dancing in middle school, exploring modern and contemporary dance styles.

Her passion for voice acting began in elementary school after watching Hunter × Hunter, where she was inspired by female voice actresses portraying dynamic characters like Gon and Killua. Determined to pursue voice acting, Okuma enrolled in a public high school specializing in performing arts, a decision guided by her mother’s advice to build a strong foundation in stagecraft before entering a voice acting agency. During this period, she studied classical ballet, stage production, sound engineering, and lighting, gaining a comprehensive understanding of theater. After graduating high school, Okuma auditioned for voice acting agencies and joined her current agency, solidifying her path in the industry. Her fascination with voice acting stemmed from its ability to bring characters to life through voice alone, without relying on physical appearance. She also expressed admiration for the craft’s professionalism and the thrill of seeing her name in the credits.

=== Career ===
Okuma debuted as a voice actress in 2021, with a minor role in the Japanese dub of Marvel film Eternals. In 2022, she was announced as the voice of Wakana Shiki, second generation member of the fictional idol group Liella! from the anime Love Live! Superstar!!. As a member of Liella!'s second generation, Okuma quickly gained popularity among fans.

On August 30, 2024, Okuma announced her solo music project, Spileben, with its name representing both her artistic vision and the collaborative efforts of her team. Okuma and her team wanted the project to showcase a bold, confident persona, distinct from her earlier "cute and wholesome" image in Love Live!. Her debut EP as Spileben, titled Joshō (序章; lit. 'Prologue'), was released digitally on October 30, 2024, and physically on November 2.

In 2025, she became part of the Love Live! special group AiScReam, whose song "Ai Scream!" became a viral hit on social media worldwide.

== Discography ==
=== Studio albums ===
List of albums released as lead artist (Note: As Spileben.)
Title	Album details	Peak chart positions
Title	Album details	JPN
You Never Know	Released: October 7, 2026; Label: KPR; Formats: CD, digital download, streaming	—

=== Extended plays ===
List of extended plays released as lead artist
Title	Album details	Peak chart positions
Title	Album details	JPN Digital
Joshō	Released: October 30, 2024; Label: StarRise/Fearless Music; Formats: Digital download, streaming	46

=== Singles ===
List of singles released as lead artist
Title	Year	Peak chart positions	Album
Title	Year	JPN	Album
"Deadline"	2025	—	You Never Know
"Everything Anything"	2025	—	You Never Know
"Still's the Time"	2026	—	You Never Know
"It's Your Day"	2026	—	You Never Know
"Loop" (Note: Maaya Sakamoto cover.) (from CrosSing)	2026	—	Non-album single

== Filmography ==
=== Anime ===
- Love Live! Superstar!! (2022–2024) – Shiki Wakana
- Zom 100: Bucket List of the Dead (2023) – female zombie
- The Strongest Tank's Labyrinth Raids (2024) – female student A
- My Hero Academia: Vigilantes (2026) – schoolgirl
- You and I Are Polar Opposites (2026) – female student

=== Video games ===
- Love Live! School Idol Festival (2023–2024) – Shiki Wakana
- Sega Net Mahjong MJ (2024) – Daisangen
- Stellar Blade (2024) – Mother Sphere
- Mobile Legends: Bang Bang (2024) – Shokushin
- Magical Girl Witch Trials (2025) – Nanoka Kurobe
- Kioku no Kenban (2025)
- Infinity Nikki (2025) – Fina
- Saros (2026) – Nitya (young)
