= Love Live! Superstar!! (TV series) =

- Promotional artwork
- No. of episodes: 36

Release
- Original network: NHK Educational TV
- Original release: July 11, 2021 – December 22, 2024

Season chronology
- ← Previous; Love Live! Nijigasaki High School; Idol Club

Love Live! Superstar!! is an anime television series produced by Sunrise as the fourth installment in the Love Live! franchise. It is directed by Takahiko Kyogoku, with the screenplay written by Jukki Hanada and Atsushi Saito designing the characters. The series follows five high school girls who overcome personal challenges as members of their school idol group Liella! on their way to gaining prominence in the school idol world. The first season aired 12 episodes on NHK Educational TV from July 11 to October 17, 2021. A second season aired from July 17 to October 9, 2022. A third season aired from October 6 to December 22, 2024. Crunchyroll (previously known as Funimation) has licensed the series for international releases. The English dub of the first season, directed by Jill Harris and Michelle Rojas, was produced by Studio Nano in Irving, Texas.

For the first season, Liella! perform both the opening and ending themes, titled "Start!! True Dreams" and "Mirai wa Kaze no Yō ni" (未来は風のように) respectively, from episode 2 onwards. Special animated music videos made specifically for the NHK Educational TV broadcast featuring original songs by Liella! air after each episode titled "Songs of Liella!". For the second season, Liella! again perform both the opening and ending themes, titled "We Will!!" and "Oikakeru Yume no Saki de" (追いかける夢の先で). For the third season, Liella! again perform both the opening and ending themes titled "Let's Be One" and "Daisuki Full Power" respectively.

== Episode list ==
=== Season 1 ===
Overall	Episode	Title (Note: All English titles are taken from Crunchyroll.)	Insert song(s)	Ending theme singer(s)	Songs of Liella!	Original release date
66	1	"This Yet Unknown Feeling"; Transliteration: "Mada Na mo nai Kimochi" (Japanese: まだ名もないキモチ)	"Mirai Yohō Hallelujah!" (未来予報ハレルヤ!, Future Forecast Hallelujah!) by Liella!	—	"Primary" by Liella!	July 11, 2021
Kanon Shibuya is on her way to her first day at Yuigaoka Private Girls High School. Keke Tang, a new classmate who just transferred from China, is delighted with Kanon's singing and attempts to recruit her to form a school idol club, but Kanon refuses. Kanon later confesses to Keke that she always wanted to sing, but she passes out in a panic when she performs in public, ultimately giving up singing after she fails the exam to join Yuigaoka's music course. After failing to recruit other girls to join Keke's club, Kanon hears from Keke that her true wish is to become a school idol with her. Kanon runs away at first, but inspired by Keke, Kanon begins to sing in front of their schoolmates, apparently overcoming her fears.
67	2	"No School Idols Allowed?!"; Transliteration: "Sukūru Aidoru Kinshi!?" (Japanese: スクールアイドル禁止!?)	—	Kanon Shibuya (Sayuri Date)	"Memories" by Kanon Shibuya (Sayuri Date)	July 18, 2021
Kanon is reinvigorated by her newfound confidence only to find Keke distraught over her proposal to form a school idol club having been rejected by Ren Hazuki. Kanon enlists her friend Chisato Arashi to find out any weakness Ren may have that she may exploit, but nothing comes to light. Kanon and Keke draw up a petition to gain support for the club's formation, and after talking with the headmistress, she agrees to let them form the club if they can get first place in an upcoming local school idol festival. Chisato agrees to teach Kanon and Keke how to dance and also build up Keke's complete lack of stamina. Meanwhile, Kanon starts to write a song based on lyrics provided by Keke. After several days, Kanon completes the song and goes out to jog alongside Keke in the morning, telling her that this is only the beginning.
68	3	"KeKa"; Transliteration: "Kūkā" (Japanese: クーカー)	"Tiny Stars" by Kanon Shibuya (Sayuri Date) and Keke Tang (Liyuu)	Kanon Shibuya (Sayuri Date) and Keke Tang (Liyuu)	"Memories" by Chisato Arashi (Nako Misaki)	August 8, 2021 (Note: Due to the 2020 Summer Olympics, the third episode, originally scheduled to air on July 25, 2021, was postponed to August 8.)
Kanon once again finds that she cannot sing in front of others. Keke and Chisato try to help her overcome her fear, but after nothing works, Keke suggests that only she will sing as long as Kanon is with her on stage. As a last minute entry, the highly popular school idol duo Sunny Passion joins the same school idol festival as them, only for Keke to realize their chances of winning have now become all but impossible. However, Kanon and Keke still resolve to give their best performance. Keke again asks Chisato to join them as a school idol, but she declines. Kanon and Keke continue to practice, but once on stage during the festival, their performance is interrupted when the lights go out, prompting the crowd to light up the arena with glow sticks with shouts of encouragement. When the lights come back on, Kanon and Keke deliver a flawless performance. Although they do not win the competition, they are awarded the best newcomer award.
69	4	"Street Corner Galaxy☆彡"; Transliteration: "Machikado Gyarakushī" (Japanese: 街角ギャラクシー☆彡)	—	Sumire Heanna (Naomi Payton)	"Anniversary" by Keke Tang (Liyuu)	August 15, 2021
Kanon and Keke are allowed to form a school idol club despite Ren's misgivings. After Sumire Heanna overhears them talking about the club, she expresses her interest in joining, spurred on by her hopes of gaining more followers on social media. Sumire quickly shows promise in her dancing skills, and she confides to the others how she used to be in show business. Sumire desperately wants to be center stage during their performances, but after a poll in their class, Kanon is the overwhelming favorite for the center position. Sumire quits the club as a result, but Kanon follows her after school, wanting to learn more about her motives for being the center. Sumire never managed to break out of being a forgettable extra, and she thought of overcoming this by being the center. She apologizes for the trouble she caused them, but Kanon scouts Sumire into joining their club, challenging her to take the center position from herself.
70	5	"Passion Island"; Transliteration: "Passhon Airando" (Japanese: パッションアイランド)	—	Chisato Arashi (Nako Misaki)	"Anniversary" by Ren Hazuki (Nagisa Aoyama)	August 22, 2021
Unable to practice outside due to a heat wave, Kanon and the other girls are left to try to find somewhere else to prepare for the Love Live competition. While at Kanon's cafe, they are visited by the Sunny Passion duo of Yuuna Hijirisawa and Mao Hiiragi with an invitation to perform at a local concert in their hometown on Kōzu-shima, to which the girls accept. Chisato later consults Yuuna and Mao, only for them to point out that her friends are lacking in the strength that comes from dancing as themselves. Chisato tells the girls she will be focusing on an upcoming dance competition and will not being going with them to their concert. Once on the island, the girls enjoy a day of fun with Sunny Passion, but Kanon is having trouble coming up with lyrics for the song they will be performing soon. Keke again brings up to Kanon about asking Chisato to join them as a school idol, but Kanon would rather have Chisato pursue dancing as her true passion.
71	6	"I Was Dreaming"; Transliteration: "Yume Mite Ita" (Japanese: 夢見ていた)	"Tokonatsu☆Sunshine" (常夏☆サンシャイン) by Kanon Shibuya (Sayuri Date), Keke Tang (Liyuu), Chisato Arashi (Nako Misaki) and Sumire Heanna (Naomi Payton)	Kanon Shibuya (Sayuri Date), Keke Tang (Liyuu), Chisato Arashi (Nako Misaki) and Sumire Heanna (Naomi Payton)	"Message" by Sumire Heanna (Naomi Payton)	September 5, 2021 (Note: Due to the 2020 Summer Paralympics, the sixth episode, originally scheduled to air on August 29, 2021, was postponed to September 5.)
Kanon, Keke and Sumire continue to prepare for the upcoming concert with Yuuna and Mao. Kanon completes the lyrics for their upcoming performance and gets positive feedback from Chisato, who Kanon in turn encourages for her upcoming dance competition. Meanwhile, Ren discovers that Chisato plans to withdraw from Yuigaoka if she does not win the competition so she can gain confidence by doing something on her own as opposed to having been supported up to now by Kanon. The day of the dance competition, Kanon comes back to mainland Tokyo to encourage Chisato, and also to tell her that she helped inspire her to become the best singer possible. After Chisato wins the competition, she goes with Kanon to join Keke and Sumire as a school idol at the concert.
72	7	"Battle! The Student Council President Elections"; Transliteration: "Kessen! Seito Kaichō-sen" (Japanese: 決戦！生徒会長選)	—	Ren Hazuki (Nagisa Aoyama)	"Message" by Kanon Shibuya (Sayuri Date)	September 12, 2021
As summer vacation comes to an end, Chisato transfers to the general program and joins Kanon's class. When the girls discover that the student council election is about to happen, Keke wants Kanon to apply for the student council president's position, much to the latter's dismay. Chisato also decides to root for Kanon, as both girls believe that if Ren becomes the president, school idols would be prohibited. To Kanon's excitement, Sumire decides to nominate herself, and despite her widely ranging campaign, she loses to Ren. When Ren goes back on her campaign promise and announces the school festival's main act will feature only the music program students, the school idols decide to investigate and discover Ren's motivation. They go to Ren's house and discover that she is the only Hazuki family member left in the house and that she has run out of money, meaning the school is at risk of closure.
73	8	"Connecting Feelings"; Transliteration: "Musubareru Omoi" (Japanese: 結ばれる想い)	"Wish Song" by Liella!	—	"Ringing!" by Chisato Arashi (Nako Misaki)	September 19, 2021
Tension continues to rise at school between the music program students and the general education students, prompting Kanon to try to find a middle ground, but to no avail. The headmistress tells Ren to explain her position at an upcoming assembly so as to reach an agreement among the students. Ren tells the school idols how her mother had once tried to save her school from closing down by being a school idol, but was unsuccessful in saving the school. Ren could not find any records of her mother as a school idol and concluded her mother regretted the attempt. After hearing from Ren about her mother's hopes of bringing people together, Kanon looks in the club room and finds a locked box containing the photos and other records of when Ren's mother was a school idol, showing Ren that she had actually cherished those memories. As a result, Ren accepts Kanon's offer to join them as a school idol. The whole school continues to prepare for the school festival, and all five school idols perform for the first time together.
74	9	"What's Your Name?"; Transliteration: "Kimitachi no Na wa?" (Japanese: 君たちの名は？)	"Dreaming Energy" by Liella!	Keke Tang (Liyuu), Chisato Arashi (Nako Misaki), Sumire Heanna (Naomi Payton) and Ren Hazuki (Nagisa Aoyama)	"Ringing!" by Keke Tang (Liyuu)	September 26, 2021
Applications for the upcoming Love Live! competition have opened, but Keke tells the other girls that it will not be easy making it through the preliminary rounds. They first have to decide on a group name, but they cannot settle on anything, and turn to livestreaming in the hopes of getting suggestions from their fans, only for it to end in failure. Meanwhile, Kanon is having trouble thinking up lyrics for their new song, preventing Ren from composing the music until she is done. The next day, Kanon is inspired by a conversation with her classmates about how they view the school idols, soon completing the lyrics and even coming up with their group name: Liella!
75	10	"Check It Out!!"; Transliteration: "Chekera!!" (Japanese: チェケラッ!!)	"Nonfiction!!" (ノンフィクション!!) by Liella!	Keke Tang (Liyuu) and Sumire Heanna (Naomi Payton)	"Dears" by Ren Hazuki (Nagisa Aoyama)	October 3, 2021
Due to there being more Love Live! applicants this year than ever before, the school idols have to perform a song based on a rap theme, with the groups who pass allowed to continue to the preliminary round. Sumire shows the other girls that she has a knack for rapping, allowing her to take the center position for their stage performance, despite some misgivings from Keke. However, Keke's opinion of Sumire changes when she sees how hard she has been working to prepare for the concert. After the girls upload a test video, the general opinion of their schoolmates is that Sumire should not be in the center position, upsetting her as a result. After school, Sumire overhears a phone call with Keke and her sister, saying that she will go back to Shanghai if her ambitions as a school idol do not pan out. Unsure of her own abilities, Sumire tries to give up the center position, but Keke reassures her that she thinks Sumire can do it, giving her the confidence she needs to perform as the center at the concert.
76	11	"Once More, at That Place"; Transliteration: "Mō Ichido, Ano Basho de" (Japanese: もう一度、あの場所で)	"Watashi no Symphony" (私のSymphony, My Symphony) by Kanon Shibuya (Sayuri Date)	Liella!	"Dears" by Sumire Heanna (Naomi Payton)	October 10, 2021
Liella! makes it through into the preliminary rounds for Love Live!, and the girls agree to perform at the elementary school Kanon and Chisato had attended. Chisato is concerned about Kanon's performance issues returning at the school where her stage fright had first manifested, and the girls visit the school with Kanon able to sing on stage while holding hands with the others. Liella! will have to perform a solo as the theme for the Tokyo preliminary round, and Kanon is unanimously elected to perform it for the competition. To help Kanon overcome her fears, the other girls conspire to have Kanon sing alone at the elementary school. Kanon realizes she has to overcome this herself, and remembers that she was scared to sing in front of others even as a child. Kanon sings flawlessly on stage, soon followed by the other girls to sing with her.
77	12	"Song for All"	"Starlight Prologue" by Liella!	Liella!	"Departure" by Liella!	October 17, 2021
Liella!'s recent concert has brought in new applicants to their school for the following year, and they are gearing up for a live-streamed concert on Christmas to determine which school idol group will represent Tokyo. Their schoolmates offer to produce the stage for the concert so Liella! can focus on their performance. Sunny Passion visits Kanon, and the latter explains how she has never really cared about winning or losing as long as she could sing. Sunny Passion tells her that once she sings at Love Live!, she will understand why everyone feels like they have to win. Liella! continue practicing, and their schoolmates unveil an illuminated stage set up downtown for the concert. Following the performance, Liella! takes second place behind Sunny Passion, and Kanon realizes what they meant about winning so as to give something back to everyone who had helped them along the way. Reinvigorated, Liella! vows to work hard to someday make it to Love Live! and win it. Months later, a new school year has started with Liella! practicing on the school roof.

=== Season 2 ===
Overall	Episode	Title	Insert song(s)	Ending theme singer(s)	Songs of Liella!	Original release date
91 (Note: The second season of Love Live! Nijigasaki High School Idol Club aired between the first and second seasons of Love Live! Superstar!!.)	13	"Welcome to Liella!!"; Transliteration: "Yōkoso Riera! e!" (Japanese: ようこそLiella!へ！)	"Welcome to Bokura no Sekai" (Welcome to 僕らのセカイ, Welcome to Our World) by Liella!	—	"Dreamer Coaster" by Kanon Shibuya (Sayuri Date)	July 17, 2022
Kinako Sakurakoji arrives at Tokyo, and enters Yuigaoka High School. She notices Mei Yoneme fawning over Liella!, but is confused. Later, Kinako peeks at the rooftop, where Liella! is practicing, but she falls, and the girls notice her. Kinako explains that she is lost, so Kanon guides her to her apartment. On the way, Kanon takes her to her café, where she explains to Kinako that becoming a school idol changed her life. The next day, many new students are shown to be fans of Liella!, and Kinako asks Natsumi Onitsuka, who is streaming, if she is an "L-Tuber". Later, Liella! announces their spot in the Tokyo tournament. Ren then tells Liella! that the Music Course's facilities are now available to General Course students, and that many clubs are being created. However, the School Idol Club didn't get any applicants. Kinako and Liella! are separately told that nobody wants to join because they are afraid of not being good enough. That night, Kanon asks Kinako to be a school idol. The next day, Natsumi encourages Kinako, while Shiki Wakana drags her to the rooftop. Liella! then performs "Welcome to Bokura no Sekai", which amazes Kinako.
92	14	"Second-years and First-years"; Transliteration: "Ninensei to Ichinensei" (Japanese: 2年生と1年生)	—	Kinako Sakurakoji (Nozomi Suzuhara)	"Dreamer Coaster" by Kinako Sakurakoji (Nozomi Suzuhara)	July 24, 2022
During training, Kinako is shown to be unathletic, so Keke makes a training plan for her. After school, Shiki asks Kinako to invite Mei to the School Idol Club. The next morning, Kinako struggles to run, and Kanon offers to run with her. Later, Kanon tells Kinako that she wants more first-years in the club. In class, Kinako loudly asks Mei to become a school idol, but Mei tells her to not talk to her about school idols. Later, Kinako struggles with PE class, making others think that the club's training is difficult. After school, the club still has no applicants, and Kinako thinks this is her fault, as she caused others to misunderstand the training regimen's difficulty. As a result, the club tries to reduce the regimen's difficulty to attract new members, but Kinako still can't complete the lighter regimen. After training, Mei encourages Kinako. The next day, all club members coincidentally meet in the park early in the morning, and Kinako tells the second-years that she still wants to do the harder training regimen, and the club does so. That day, while training, a mysterious woman is shown stalking Kanon and saying her name.
93	15	"Next in Line to Win"; Transliteration: "Yūshō Kōho" (Japanese: 優勝候補)	"Butterfly Wing" by Wien Margarete (Yuina) "Go!! Restart" (Go!! リスタート) by Liella!	Liella!	"Endless Circuit" (エンドレスサーキット) by Keke Tang (Liyuu)	July 31, 2022
Ren finds out that Liella! will be the headliner to the year's Yoyogi School Idol Festival. They then realize that they have never actually won the Love Live!. That night, Kanon asks Sunny Passion about their endorsement. They say that Liella! did well, but not well enough to beat them. The next morning, Kinako, now more athletic, tells Kanon about Mei. The next day, Natsumi sees the Festival and becomes interested. Meanwhile, backstage, the mysterious woman calls for Kanon and leaves. Kanon, with the other members, run outside, seeing her perform "Butterfly Wing" and winning. Kanon finds out the winner, Wien Margarete, is a third-year middle school student. Outside her house, Margarete tells Kanon that she will easily beat Liella!, the predicted winner, and that the competition is pointless. Kanon says that they were only predicted to win because of Sunny Passion. The next evening, the other students congratulate Kanon, and tells her that it is fine if she didn't get first place, as other clubs didn't win anything at all. The next day, before Liella!'s performance at school, Kanon tells the group that she wants everyone to be the song's center, and they perform "Go!! Restart".
94	16	"The Two in the Science Room"; Transliteration: "Kagaku-shitsu no Futari" (Japanese: 科学室のふたり)	—	Mei Yoneme (Akane Yabushima) and Shiki Wakana (Wakana Ōkuma)	"Endless Circuit" (エンドレスサーキット) by Sumire Heanna (Naomi Payton)	August 7, 2022
Liella! begins practicing on the roof. Ren notes the growth of other school clubs, suggesting having a meeting of school presidents, and they recommend Kanon as the club president. Meanwhile, Mei watches them from the science room, with Shiki, another member of the Science Lovers' Association, teasing her about her reactions to the group's performance, telling her that she should join the club before it is too late. Later, Kanon says Chisato should be president of the club instead. Shiki joins the club to encourage Mei to do the same, who watches them all jealously. She leaves, confusing them all, and they find her room, which is full of school idol paraphernalia. Chisato appears at a meeting of school presidents as the leader of the school idol club. Kanon talks to Mei, who realizes that Shiki is more than an acquaintance for her. She teases Shiki about liking school idols and they both join the club together.
95	17	"Money Makes the World Go Round"; Transliteration: "Manī wa Tenka no Mawari Mono" (Japanese: マニーは天下の回りもの)	—	Natsumi Onitsuka (Aya Emori)	"Meikyū Sanka" (迷宮讃歌, Maze Hymn) by Ren Hazuki (Nagisa Aoyama)	August 14, 2022
Shiki, Mei, and Kinako are lauded by fellow classmates for becoming new school idol club members. Mei reveals her talent for playing piano. Shiki, Mei, and Kinako feel they will continue being outpaced by the more experienced members of the club. Some time after, Onitsuka comes to the club for selfish reasons, proposing to become their producer. Kanon signs the contract with her, though Sumire is skeptical. Some of the group members begin playing a video game, which Ren becomes addicted to. Later, Kanon says they should still practice together despite different skill levels. They confront Onitsuka about exploiting them for money. Kanon says they should wait and see. Shiki, Mei, and Kinako later go with Onitsuka's idea to train on their own schedule through the summer, instead of as part of the whole group, which Chisato accepts. Onitsuka is overjoyed that they went with her idea, claiming it will make her a lot of money.
96	18	"Dekkaidow!"	"Vitamin Summer!" (ビタミンSUMMER!) by Liella!	Liella!	"Meikyū Sanka" (迷宮讃歌, Maze Hymn) by Natsumi Onitsuka (Aya Emori)	August 21, 2022
Onitsuka gathers Shiki, Mei, and Kinako to come up with a group name, but they resist this. Later, Kanon wonders where they went wrong and why the first years don't want to practice with them, but the other group members turn around her mood to be more positive. Meanwhile, Onitsuka, Shiki, Mei, and Kinako decide to have a summer camp at Kinako's place out in the country. Onitsuka records their practices and wants to stir up a controversy so she can bring in more cash. Sumire worries about the first years getting overconfident and challenges them. Ren proposes talking to Onitsuka at least once, which the other group members agree. She challenges Shiki, Mei, and Kinako to do the same dance moves as them, with Onitsuka pushing them to surpass the other group members. She ends up joining their practice sessions as a participant. Kanon meets Onitsuka and proposes she become the group's ninth member, with Onitsuka ultimately agreeing. The whole group ends up performing at the summer festival.
97	19	"UR Ren Hazuki"; Transliteration: "Yū Āru Hazuki Ren" (Japanese: UR 葉月恋)	—	Ren Hazuki (Nagisa Aoyama)	"Prime Adventure" (プライム・アドベンチャー) by Liella!	August 28, 2022
Liella!'s group members discuss the upcoming Love Live! preliminary competition, which will be fully remote and without any theme, unlike the year before. Ren comes to the next practice in a bit of a daze and everyone is confused. She agrees to compose the song. Mei sees her in the music room and sees her playing a video game. It is revealed she recently became a gamer and became addicted. She gives Mei a key to lock up the games so she can focus rather than being distracted, and she agrees. Chisato encourages Kanon to get involves in the student council. Ren confides in Mei that she can't write the song because she is thinking too much about games. Kanon proposes that she become vice-president, surprising Ren, but she is thankful. Mei encourages Ren to be honest about her gaming addiction. She admits to the group about it and they play a VR rhythm game together. Using Kanon's lyrics, Ren composes the melody for the song for the competition on a piano.
98	20	"Chance Way"	"Chance Day, Chance Way!" by Liella!	Kinako Sakurakoji (Nozomi Suzuhara), Mei Yoneme (Akane Yabushima), Shiki Wakana (Wakana Ōkuma) and Natsumi Ōnitsuka (Aya Emori)	"Parade wa Itsumo (パレードはいつも) by Mei Yoneme (Akane Yabushima)	September 11, 2022 (Note: The eighth episode, originally scheduled to air on September 4, 2022, was postponed to September 11 due to the anime being on a 1-week hiatus.)
The new student council is sworn-in, including Kinako as secretary and Kanon as vice-president. Keke declares that creating a stage is important, so they can stand out above any competitors at the upcoming preliminary round of Love Live! Later, Keke and Mei go into a stadium to ask them if they can use it for their performance, and they get rejected. Keke is surprised the club is not holding a concert at the upcoming open house, so other clubs can shine instead. The open house comes and Kanon's sister, Aria, comes, with Keke inviting her to enroll next year and join the school idol club. Kanon looks into the city's history to get inspiration for their performance, Sunny Passion shares their stage made by fellow islanders with Liella! members, making Kanon think about their stage. Kanon tries to find a special place in the town and fellow students offer to help them. She later finds where their stage will be for their performance. They later perform their song there and Margarete is watching.
99	21	"For Victory"; Transliteration: "Shōri no Tame ni" (Japanese: 勝利のために)	—	Keke Tang (Liyuu) and Sumire Heanna (Naomi Payton)	"Parade wa Itsumo (パレードはいつも) by Shiki Wakana (Wakana Ōkuma)	September 18, 2022
After advancing to the Tokyo preliminaries for Love Live!, the idol club's members are happy for the fame, while Kanon and Chisato emphasize getting to the final round is vital. Keke reveals that Sunny Passion didn't make the cut. Sunny Passions calls them, proving what Keke said was true, saying they lost to Wien Margarete. Sumire confronts Keke about the fact she would return to Shanghai if Liella! doesn't win Love Live!, and Keke says she can't tell the group. The next day, Sumire says only the second-years should perform at Love Live!, so they can beat Margarete, an idea that Kanon and the others reject. As a result, Keke breaks down crying and practice is cancelled. The first-years sing to Sumire, saying only the first-years should perform, surprising her. After Sumire reverses herself, Keke urges them all to perform together and hugs Sumire as she is crying, saying she "hates" her while crying herself. The next day, Liella! begins their special training for the competition.
100	22	"A Song That Rings Through Shibuya"; Transliteration: "Shibuya ni Hibiku Uta" (Japanese: 渋谷に響く歌)	"Edelstein" (エーデルシュタイン) by Wien Margarete (Yuina) "Sing! Shine! Smile!" by Liella!	Liella!	"Kakeru Merry-go-round" (駆けるメリーゴーランド) by Chisato Arashi (Nako Misaki)	September 25, 2022
Liella! is at a training camp in Hokkaido, at Kinako's house, part of Kanon's plan to bring them all together, but are trapped there because of a huge blizzard. Chisato and Shiki practice dance moves together, while Ren and Mei compose the song, Kanon and Kinako try to think of lyrics, and they all connect in the process. Onitsuka, Keke, and Sumire work on preparing the set to show off to other schools, for their virtual press conference. At their conference, Kanon speaks on behalf of them all. Margarete, during the conference, says she is competing to show how amateur everyone else is in the competition. Kanon wonders about what Margarete said and what it means to sing, and talks to Chisato about it. The next day, Kanon proposes that they take a day to relax, including ice fishing, building snowmen, and snowball fights. Afterward, Kanon works on a new song. Later, Margarete performs her song, which shakes them to their core. They perform their song and eagerly await the results.
101	23	"Dreams"; Transliteration: "Yume" (Japanese: 夢)	—	Kanon Shibuya (Sayuri Date)	"Kakeru Merry-go-round" (駆けるメリーゴーランド) by Kanon Shibuya (Sayuri Date)	October 2, 2022
The results are announced, with Margarete placing second, and Liella! getting the finalist place, meaning they are advancing to the national competition. All of group members are overjoyed, including Kanon. Margarete refuses to accept the results. Kanon replies, saying if she doesn't respect the competition, she shouldn't be a school idol. Afterward, Liella! meets together. Most members are angry and annoyed with Margarete. Kanon finds out that Margarete wanted to attend the National Music Academy in Vienna. She talks to Margarete, who reveals that if she won Love Live! she could attend the school. The school headmistress tells Kanon that the elite music school is inviting her to study there but Kanon is unsure. She tells her fellow Liella! members about it. Chisato talks to Margarete after chasing her down and she reveals a deal she created: if Kanon studies abroad, then Margarete can join her. Kanon urges them to practice, even in the cold, and Chisato says Kanon should study abroad, even though they are against it.
102	24	"A Story That Makes My Dreams Come True"; Transliteration: "Watashi o Kanaeru Monogatari" (Japanese: 私を叶える物語)	"Mirai no Oto ga Kikoeru" (未来の音が聴こえる, I Can Hear The Sound Of The Future) by Liella!	Liella!	"Time to Go" by Liella!	October 9, 2022
Chisato insists that Kanon study abroad, despite Kanon saying otherwise. Keke and Sumire talk about what Chisato said. Ren talks with Chisato, who says she said nothing wrong. The first-years wonder what would happen to Liella! if Kanon left to study abroad. Kanon's mother and sister talk to her about the offer to study abroad, and what Chisato said. Kanon and Margarete talk, with Margarete transparently telling her about her talk with Chisato and the study abroad offer, suggesting she take a leap of faith. Kanon goes to her school, with Chisato continuing to insist that Kanon study abroad. She tells all of them that she wants to study abroad, so she can represent their school, even though they say Liella! isn't what it is without her there. They all pledge to win Love Live!, together. Later, they train and work together to prepare for their performance. They sing together at the Love Live! nationals and are described as the new superstars of the competition after garnering the top prize. As Kanon is about to leave the school grounds, she encounters Margarete, who declares that Kanon's study abroad is cancelled, shocking her.

=== Season 3 ===
Overall	Episode	Title	Insert song(s)	Ending theme singer(s)	Songs of Liella!	Original release date
103	25	"The Path I've Chosen"; Transliteration: "Watashi no Kimeta Michi" (Japanese: 私の決めた道)	"Butterfly Wing (Piano Ver.)" by Wien Margarete (Yuina)	Kanon Shibuya (Sayuri Date)	"Dolce" by Wien Margarete (Yuina)	October 6, 2024
Margarete starts attending Yuigaoka. It is revealed that Margarete was accurate: Kanon is not studying abroad, but will be staying there for a year to learn about singing from Kanon. This outcome disappoints Margarete and Kanon. Margarete refuses to join Liella, seeing them as the enemy, and even proposes a new school idol club to challenge them. Kanon still mulls how to tell them that she is still in Japan. Ren confronts Margarete about her new club. That night, Kanon meets Chisato secretly and reveals her conditions for staying. Chisato says she will be supportive no matter what. The next day, she announces to Liella! she will not be returning to them, but will be working with Margarete with the intention of bringing their groups together. She later offers to join Margarete's school idol group. In a post-credits scene, a mysterious girl also decides to sign up.
104	26	"TomaKanoTe"; Transliteration: "TomaKanōTe" (Japanese: トマカノーテ)	"Bubble Rise" by Kanon Shibuya (Sayuri Date), Wien Margarete (Yuina) and Tomari Onitsuka (Sakura Sakakura)	Kanon Shibuya (Sayuri Date), Wien Margarete (Yuina) and Tomari Onitsuka (Sakura Sakakura)	"Dolce" by Tomari Onitsuka (Sakura Sakakura)	October 13, 2024
Margarete flatly rejects Kanon's request, accusing her of spying on Liella!'s behalf and rewording her advertisement to explicitly ban the group's members from joining. The other girl mentions Kanon legally has a right to join since her application predates Margarete changing the ad, then adds she is only present to watch Kanon and Margarete. Liella! speculates on why Kanon chose to join Margarete's group, while Chisato surmises she wants to improve herself in a new environment. The mysterious girl eventually submits her application, introducing herself as Natsumi's younger sister Tomari Onitsuka and wishing to understand the material benefits to being a school idol. After school, Margarete moves into Kanon's house. Kanon, Margarete, and Tomari begin practicing together for the Yoyogi School Idol Festival before performing their debut song as TomaKanoTe.
105	27	"The White-Colored Center"; Transliteration: "Shiroiro no Center" (Japanese: 白色のセンター)	"Special Color" by Liella!	Mei Yoneme (Akane Yabushima) and Shiki Wakana (Wakana Ōkuma)	Special mini drama "Yuigaoka Joshi! Kyoufu no Nana Fushigi ni Liella! ga Semaru (Zenpen)" (結ヶ丘女子！恐怖の七不思議にLiella!が迫る -前編-)	October 20, 2024
Wanting an underclassman to lead them, Chisato encourages Shiki to be the center for Liella!'s next song. Shiki is hesitant about her new role as she feels she does not stand out compared to her friends. The group agrees to continue with her as school idols come from diverse backgrounds and can shine regardless of their personalities. Although Shiki is still anxious ahead of their performance, she receives motivation from Mei, who promises to be by her side.
106	28	"No Rain, No Rainbow"	–	Natsumi Onitsuka (Aya Emori)	Special mini drama "Futatsu no Yakiimo" (2つの焼き芋)	October 27, 2024
Liella! and TomaKanoTe continue preparing for the Yoyogi School Idol Festival, though Margarete is wary of Tomari, who remains distant from Margarete and Kanon despite her talent. In an encounter during training, Tomari confronts Natsumi and asks if being a school idol is worth the effort. The girls follow the Onitsukas to their home in Ibaraki Prefecture. Natsumi reveals she started attending Yuigaoka on Tomari's word as it would be beneficial to her career as an L-Tuber, while Tomari's fixation on financial success stems from growing up watching her older sister consider numerous career paths but failing each time. Since then, Tomari developed a cynical view of pursuing dreams that provide a low return on investment such as being an idol. Despite the risks, Natsumi professes she wants to continue as a school idol.
107	29	"Ni hao! Shanghai! Xiaolongbao~!"; Transliteration: "Nǐ hǎo! Shànghǎi! Xiǎolóngbāo~!" (Chinese: 你好！上海！小籠包〜！)	"Hoshikuzu Cruising (Shanghai Ver.)" (星屑クルージング ～上海 Ver.～) by Keke Tang (Liyuu)	Liella! (~8 Members Ver.~)	Special mini drama "Camp no Omoide" (キャンプの思い出)	November 3, 2024
After finals, Kanon ponders how to answer a survey about what to do after graduation while Keke is conflicted on her future, preferring to prioritize the present. Keke returns to Shanghai over summer break, while TomaKanoTe and Liella! are invited to visit. The girls are unable to find Keke, who has not been messaging them since her return home save for vague messages. At Lujiazui, they are approached by a local who seemingly knows them and invites them onto a ferry. Onboard, Keke performs a song for them before the woman introduces herself as Keke's older sister Mengmeng.
108	30	"Treasure"; Transliteration: "Takaramono" (Japanese: タカラモノ)	"Zettaiteki Lover" (絶対的LOVER, Absolute Lover) by Liella!	Keke Tang (Liyuu) and Sumire Heanna (Naomi Payton)	Special mini drama "Kanon no Latte Art" (かのんのラテアート)	November 10, 2024
Mengmeng explains her motives for inviting the girls were to have them perform at Shanghai's school idol festival, which would hopefully convince Keke's parents to pursue being an idol. Through flashbacks, Keke recalls being one of the top students but wanted to do more with her life, eventually discovering Sunny Passion and deciding that to be her new dream. Liella! encourages Keke to be their lead for the festival, though she is hesitant to reveal the news to her parents. Keke explains she plans to attend college in Beijing in accordance with her parents' wishes, though Kanon is aware of her true aspirations to continue in music. After the performance, in which the groups perform together, Keke declares to her parents on stage what she wants to do and asks for their support.
109	31	"In Order to Win Against Liella!"; Transliteration: "Liella! ni Katsu Tameni" (Japanese: Liella!に勝つために)	–	Tomari Onitsuka (Sakura Sakakura)	Special mini drama "Utagoe ga Hibiku Naka de" (歌声が響く中で)	November 17, 2024
With Love Live! approaching, Liella! wants to invite TomaKanoTe to join them since only one group can represent Yuigaoka in the competition. The second-years try to convince Margarete and Tomari to merge but are turned down. Kanon arranges a sleepover for TomaKanoTe, where Tomari and Margarete explain their intentions for staying as they are: Tomari wants to see Natsumi fully commit to being an idol, while Margarete remains focused on defeating Liella! Convinced, Kanon agrees to keep the groups separate and compete against each other.
110	32	"Yuigaoka VS Yuigaoka"; Transliteration: "Yuigaoka VS Yuigaoka" (Japanese: 結ヶ丘 VS 結ヶ丘)	"Dazzling Game" by Liella!	Chisato Arashi (Nako Misaki)	Special mini drama "Yuigaoka Joshi! Kyoufu no Nana Fushigi ni Liella! ga Semaru (Kouhen)" (結ヶ丘女子！恐怖の七不思議にLiella!が迫る -後編-)	November 24, 2024
TomaKanoTe and Liella! organize a concert at the cultural festival to compete for the right to represent their school at Love Live!, though the student body is torn and wants to see them perform a joint song again. Natsumi and Mei work with Tomari and Margerete to write the song's lyrics, and reach an agreement that the losing group would have to grant a wish from the winner. Both sides disagree on how to approach the song, increasing tensions between the Onitsukas. The others visit them and encourage Natsumi to confront her sister; Natsumi tearfully pleads for Tomari that she wishes to restore their relationship as in the past. After making amends, they complete the song. The performance entails both groups initially performing on different sides before coming together for the chorus. Afterward, the students vote for them to enter Love Live! as a single group, which they accept.
111	33	"Salzburger Nockerln"; Transliteration: "Salzburger Nockerln" (Japanese: ザルツブルガー・ノッケルン)	"Let's Be One" by Liella!	Wien Margarete (Yuina)	"Summer Escape!!" by Kinako Sakurakoji (Nozomi Suzuhara), Mei Yoneme (Akane Yabushima), Shiki Wakana (Wakana Ōkuma) and Natsumi Onitsuka (Aya Emori)	December 1, 2024
The united Liella! hosts their first practice together to prepare for the district tournament. Margarete struggles to get along with her new peers, and methods to help her warm up to them fail. The third-years split the girls into two groups for practice and ask Margarete to come up with the formation and singing roles, thinking her detached nature would allow her to provide an unbiased assessment of the group. However, Margarete feels it would be a detriment after concluding that Kinako and Natsumi should be in the background. The affected girls decide to practice with Margarete to improve themselves. At the tournament, Liella! advances through the tournament.
112	34	"Kinako Sakurakoji"; Transliteration: "Sakurakōji Kinako" (Japanese: 桜小路 きな子)	"Egao no Promise" (笑顔のPromise) by Liella!	Ren Hazuki (Nagisa Aoyama) and Kinako Sakurakoji (Nozomi Suzuhara)	"11th Moon" by Wien Margarete (Yuina) and Tomari Onitsuka (Sakura Sakakura)	December 8, 2024
Liella! qualifies for Love Live!'s Tokyo round. The girls enlist Kinako as the lyricist for the round's song, but she is unsure what to write. While moping, Kinako overhears Ren being urged to select her successor as student council president, though her efforts have been fruitless so far. Kinako offers to help, while Ren assists her in figuring out what she wants to use for lyrics. After reading notes from the other Liella! membeers, Kinako writes a song about being supported by her friends. Inspired, Ren offers her the student council president role, though she initially declines due to the pressure. After Margarete gives her support, Kinako agrees to take the post. Liella! performs her song at the Tokyo round and advances to the finals.
113	35	"Superstar!!"; Transliteration: "Superstar!!" (Japanese: スーパースター!!)	"Superstar!!" (スーパースター!!, Superstar!!) by Liella!	Liella!	"Hitohira Dake" (ひとひらだけ) by Kanon Shibuya (Sayuri Date), Keke Tang (Liyuu), Chisato Arashi (Nako Misaki), Sumire Heanna (Naomi Payton) and Ren Hazuki (Nagisa Aoyama)	December 15, 2024
The girls celebrate the new year, while Kanon is visiting Vienna's National Music Academy. Kanon meets Margarete's older sister, who encourages her to attend the school once she graduates. In Japan, Chisato is accepted for a professional dance team after a successful audition while Sumire receives an offer from a talent scout. Tomari asks Margarete to stay in Japan and lead Liella! next year, to which she subsequently agrees. Upon Kanon's return, she and the others get caught up as they finalize their plans after graduation. Liella! performs at the national round and wins the Love Live! for the second year in a row.
114	36	"Forever and Ever!"; Transliteration: "Zutto Zutto!" (Japanese: ずっとずっと！)	"Hajimari wa Kimi no Sora (11 Ver.)" (始まりは君の空 ～11 Ver.～) by Liella!	–	"Musubu Melody" (結ぶメロディ) by Liella!	December 22, 2024
The third-years prepare for their graduation. Kanon enjoys her final days in Japan before going to Vienna. Keke reveals she will return to Shanghai for college before becoming a professional idol, while also joining the same talent agency as Sumire as her producer. Ren intends to go to college before possibly taking over as Yuigaoka's director. Mei is named the new president of the school idol club. The day before graduating, the seniors reflect on their time in high school before doing a sleepover on campus, where they write a final song. As the new student council president, Kinako gives the commencement speech to the graduating class before Ren delivers her reply, both expressing their gratitude. After the ceremony, the seniors bid their farewells before performing their last song as school idols.
