= Love Live! =

Japanese multimedia franchise

Love Live! School Idol Project Series
- English franchise logo
- Created by: Hajime Yatate (story); Sakurako Kimino (concept)
- Original work: Love Live! School Idol Project
- Years: 2010–present

Print publications
- Magazine: LoveLive! Days

Films and television
- Films: Love Live! The School Idol Movie; Love Live! Sunshine!! The School Idol Movie Over the Rainbow; Love Live! Nijigasaki High School Idol Club The Movie: Final Chapter Part 1
- Television series: See below

Games
- Video games: Love Live! School Idol Festival (2013); Love Live! School Idol Festival: After School Activity (2016); Love Live! School Idol Festival All Stars (2019); Love Live! School Idol Festival 2 (2023); Link Like! Love Live! (2023)

Audio
- Original music: Love Live! discography

Love Live! School Idol Project Series (Note: Japanese: ラブライブ! School idol project series, Hepburn: Rabu Raibu! School Idol Project Series; shortened as Love Live! Series (ラブライブ!シリーズ), or simply Love Live! (ラブライブ!)) is a Japanese multimedia project created by Hajime Yatate and Sakurako Kimino and co-produced by Kadokawa through ASCII Media Works; Bandai Namco Music Live through music label Lantis; and Bandai Namco Filmworks through its animation studio Sunrise. Each of the individual titles within the franchise revolve around teenage girls who become "school idols". Starting in June 2010 with Love Live! School Idol Project, the franchise has seen multiple anime television series, three anime films, light novels, manga, and video games. The rhythm game series Love Live! School Idol Festival features characters across multiple Love Live! titles.

== Overview ==
Each title in the Love Live! franchise focuses on groups of teenage schoolgirls who become "school idols" as an extracurricular activity, and their main activities involve singing and choreographed dancing to self-written songs they perform at concerts or other music events. Other activities include designing their own costumes, as well as filming promotional videos and music videos. Top-class groups are very popular among fans of school idols, aided in part by exposure in magazines and other media, in addition to merchandise of school idols sold in shops catering to otaku-related items.

The ultimate school idol competition featuring the best groups in Japan is called Love Live, and entry into the competition is determined by the popularity of each group. The size of these groups can range anywhere from solo idols to groups with nine or more members. Due to the highly competitive nature of the Love Live competition, some school idols opt not to attempt entry and simply take part in performing at other events. However, participation in the event is very prestigious, and any group that wins the competition is afforded legendary status.

== Franchise history ==
Year introduced
2010	Love Live! School Idol Project
2011–2014
2015	Love Live! Sunshine!!
2016
2017	Love Live! Nijigasaki High School Idol Club
2018–2019
2020	Love Live! Superstar!!
2021–2022
2023	Link! Like! Love Live!
2024
2025	Ikizulive! Love Live! Bluebird

Love Live! School Idol Project was first announced in the July 2010 issue of ASCII Media Works' Dengeki G's Magazine, which revealed that the magazine would be collaborating with the anime studio Sunrise and the music label Lantis to co-produce the project. The project officially began with the August 2010 issue of Dengeki G's Magazine, which introduced the story, characters, and a more detailed explanation of the project. The original plan for the story was written by Sakurako Kimino, who also writes short stories and light novels for Love Live!. Yūhei Murota created the original character designs.

Starting in August 2010, online mobile phone popularity contests were periodically held to rank the characters, which influenced the positions of the idols in the anime music videos produced by Sunrise. For example, the idol who ranked first in a given contest would be in the center position in the front row in the music video that followed. Other polls were used to determine different aspects of the idols, such as hairstyles and costumes. Fans also determined the name of the initial school idol group, ultimately choosing the name μ's (/mjuz/, muse). Lantis released the group's first single in August 2010, and they continued to release several more singles and albums over the course of the next two years, including performing their first concert in 2012 at Yokohama Blitz in Yokohama, Japan. This was soon followed by an anime television series that aired from 2013 to 2014, and an anime film in 2015.

Japanese franchise logo

The rhythm game series Love Live! School Idol Festival developed by KLab and published by Bushiroad's Bushimo for Android and iOS platforms launched in 2013. The initial game is free-to-play with an in-app purchase system. It features songs and characters across multiple Love Live! titles, along with newly introduced girls, and stories that are not included in other media. The English localization was released worldwide in 2014, and it also was localized in China, Hong Kong, Macau, Taiwan, and South Korea. An arcade version of the game developed and published by Square Enix titled Love Live! School Idol Festival: After School Activity was released in Japan in 2016, and a PlayStation 4 port was released in North America, Japan, and Southeast Asia in 2021. Another spin-off game titled Love Live! School Idol Festival All Stars was released in 2019 in Japan and 2020 worldwide.

The next major installment in the franchise was the spin-off Love Live! Sunshine!! announced in 2015. Fans also chose the name of the idol group for Sunshine, deciding on the name Aqours (/ˈækwə/, aqua). Similarly to Love Live! School Idol Project, Lantis released the group's first single in October 2015, releasing several more singles into the following year. This was followed by an anime television series that aired from 2016 to 2017, and an anime film in 2019.

In March 2017, the official website of Love Live School Idol Festival launched the "Perfect Dream Project", which featured nine new girls that would be incorporated into Love Live! Nijigasaki High School Idol Club; a tenth member was added in 2020. Unlike μ's and Aqours, they are not a traditional group, but rather individual school idols who compete with each other are referred to collectively as the Nijigasaki High School Idol Club. The idols are featured in Love Live! School Idol Festival All Stars alongside μ's and Aqours, and appear in the main Love Live! School Idol Festival game. Lantis released the debut album for Nijigasaki High School Idol Club in 2018, and this was followed by two more albums and several singles over the course of the next two years, including performing their first concert in 2018 at DiverCity Tokyo Plaza Festival Square. An anime television series premiered in 2020, with a second season which premiered in 2022.

In January 2020, a franchise-wide concert, titled Love Live! Fest, were held at Saitama Super Arena, in commemoration for the franchise's ninth anniversary. All three groups at the time performed at this concert, including μ's, which was their first performance after a three-year hiatus since their "final" concert in April 2016.

Another spin-off titled Love Live! Superstar!! was announced in 2020 as an anime television series. Fans also chose the name of the idol group for Superstar, deciding on Liella! (/liːɛlɑː/). The anime series premiered in 2021; a second season aired in 2022. A third season premiered in 2024.

Another spin-off, focusing on "virtual school idols" was announced in February 2022. They began their activities in late 2022, with the six new girls referred to as the Hasunosora Girls' High School Idol Club. A teaser video in October 2022 announced the launch of a smartphone app, Link! Like! Love Live!, released in April 2023.

A new project that focuses on musical theater performances titled School Idol Musical was announced on September 26, 2022. It features 10 all-new girls, five of each who are students of two "legendary schools" located in Osaka and Hyogo. It has been performed in 2022 and early 2023 at the New National Theatre Tokyo and Umeda Arts Theater in Osaka; in 2024 at the Theater Milano-Za, Tokyo; and in 2025 at the Nippon Seinenkan Hall in Tokyo and Shin-Kabukiza in Osaka. It was adapted into Love Live! School Idol Musical the Drama, the first live-action television series of the franchise, on Mainichi Broadcasting System and related stations in 2024, with all the main cast played by current or former idols from Hinatazaka46 (Miho Watanabe), ≠Me (Nanaka Tomita), AKB48 (Nanami Asai, Mizuki Yamauchi), Shiritsu Ebisu Chugaku (Ayaka Yasumoto, Yuna Nakamura), Chō Tokimeki Sendenbu (Julia An), LumiUnion (Rina), STU48 (Akari Yura), and Love Cocchi (Airi Yamamoto).

A new project titled Bluebird was announced on February 2, 2025.

== School idol groups ==
The main cast from the Love Live! franchise's first three series. As distinguished by their costume sets, the group on the left is μ's, the centre is Aqours, and the right is the Nijigasaki High School Idol Club.

Name		Members								
Main groups
μ's	μ's	Honoka Kōsaka (Emi Nitta)	Eli Ayase (Yoshino Nanjō)	Kotori Minami (Aya Uchida)	Umi Sonoda (Suzuko Mimori)	Rin Hoshizora (Riho Iida)	Maki Nishikino (Pile)	Nozomi Tojo (Aina Kusuda)	Hanayo Koizumi (Yurika Kubo)	Nico Yazawa (Sora Tokui)
Aqours	Aqours	Chika Takami (Anju Inami)	Riko Sakurauchi (Rikako Aida)	Kanan Matsuura (Nanaka Suwa)	Dia Kurosawa (Arisa Komiya)	You Watanabe (Shuka Saitō)	Yoshiko Tsushima (Aika Kobayashi)	Hanamaru Kunikida (Kanako Takatsuki)	Mari Ohara (Aina Suzuki)	Ruby Kurosawa (Ai Furihata)
Nijigasaki High School Idol Club	Nijigasaki High School Idol Club	Ayumu Uehara (Aguri Ōnishi)	Kasumi Nakasu (Mayu Sagara)	Shizuku Osaka (Note: Shizuku was originally a member of Seiran High School in Love Live! School Idol Festival.) (Kaori Maeda)	Karin Asaka (Miyu Kubota)	Ai Miyashita (Natsumi Murakami)	Kanata Konoe (Note: Kanata was originally a member of Shinonome Institute in Love Live! School Idol Festival.) (Akari Kitō)	Yuu Takasaki (Note: Yuu does not perform on stage.) (Hinaki Yano)		
Nijigasaki High School Idol Club	Nijigasaki High School Idol Club	Setsuna Yuki (Tomori Kusunoki) (Note: 2017–2023) (Coco Hayashi) (Note: 2023–)	Emma Verde (Note: Emma was originally a member of Y.G. International Academy in Love Live! School Idol Festival and originally only named "Emma".) (Maria Sashide)	Rina Tennoji (Chiemi Tanaka)	Shioriko Mifune (Note: Shioriko was added in August 2020.) (Moeka Koizumi)	Mia Taylor (Note: Mia and Lanzhu were added in September 2021.) (Shu Uchida)	Lanzhu Zhong (Akina Houmoto)			
Liella!	Liella!	Kanon Shibuya (Sayuri Date)	Keke Tang (Liyuu)	Chisato Arashi (Nako Misaki)	Sumire Heanna (Naomi Payton)	Ren Hazuki (Nagisa Aoyama)	Kinako Sakurakoji (Nozomi Suzuhara)			
Liella!	Liella!	Mei Yoneme (Akane Yabushima)	Shiki Wakana (Wakana Ōkuma)	Natsumi Onitsuka (Aya Emori)	Wien Margarete (Yuina)	Tomari Onitsuka (Sakura Sakakura)				
Hasunosora Girls' High School Idol Club	Hasunosora Girls' High School Idol Club	Kaho Hinoshita (Nozomi Nirei)	Sayaka Murano (Kokona Nonaka)	Kozue Otomune (Niina Hanamiya)	Tsuzuri Yugiri (Kotoko Sasaki)	Rurino Osawa (Kanna Kan)	Megumi Fujishima (Kona Tsukine)			
Hasunosora Girls' High School Idol Club	Hasunosora Girls' High School Idol Club	Ginko Momose (Hina Sakurai)	Kosuzu Kachimachi (Fuka Hayama)	Hime Anyoji (Rin Kurusu)	Ceras Yanagida Lilienfeld (Miu Miyake)	Izumi Katsuragi (Amane Shindō)	Maika Kinjo (Julia Hoshimiya)	Aoi Reisawa (Kana Asahi)	Mion Shinowa (Kanae Yuasa)	
Ikizulive!	Ikizulive!	Polka Takahashi (Honon Ayasaki)	Mai Azabu (Rina Endō)	Akira Gotō (Seri Miyano)	Hanabi Komagata (Kokoro Fujino)	Miracle Kanazawa (Aiha Sakano)				
Ikizulive!	Ikizulive!	Noriko Chōfu (Ria Seko)	Yukuri Harumiya (Yuki Okumura)	Aurora Konohana (Akane Amasawa)	Midori Yamada (Honoka Motomori)	Shion Sasaki (Aoi Suzunose)				
Rival groups
A-Rise		Tsubasa Kira (Megu Sakuragawa)	Erena Toudou (Maho Matsunaga)	Anju Yuuki (Ayuru Ōhashi)						
Saint Snow (Note: Saint Snow officially started concert activities in December 2017, with the announcement of Saint Snow Presents Love Live! Sunshine!! Hakodate Unit Carnival.) (Note: Saint Snow may also have joint performances with Aqours, in which they are collectively known as Saint Aqours Snow.)		Sarah Kazuno (Asami Tano)	Leah Kazuno (Hinata Satō)							
Sunny Passion		Yuna Hijirisawa (Chihaya Yoshitake)	Mao Hiiragi (Yuna Yūki)							
Love Live! School Idol Festival
Seiran High School		Marika Ichinose	Minami Nagayama	Aya Sugisaki	Ayumi Torii	Seira Kujō	Sachiko Tanaka	Akira Shinomiya	Yumi Fujishiro	
Chitose Bridge High School		Yū Aizawa	Fumie Nishimura	Akemi Kikuchi	Iruka Suda	Reina Saeki	Nanaka Morishima	Saki Shimozono	Rū Tatara	Nagi Shiraki
Shinonome Academy		Coco Miyashita	Sana Yūki	Christina (Manaka Iwami)	Yuri Midō	Rika Kamiya	Haruka Konoe (Kaede Hondo)	Kasane Hasekura (Sayaka Senbongi)	Mizuki Kikkawa	
Touou Academy		Shun Kurosaki	Fumi Shitara	Tsurugi Kadota	Yūki Kirihara	Fū Saiki	Misaki Shidō (Kana Motomiya)	Himeno Ayanokōji (Natsumi Hioka)	Koyuki Shirase	Ryō Aikawa
Shion Girls' Academy		Chizuko Sakamaki	Hitomi Shiga	Mikoto Fukuhara	Akira Kizaki	Yuka Tsukishima	Sayuri Hyōdō	Sakura Kurobane (Nichika Ōmori)	Sakuya Kurobane (Reina Kondō)	Mutsuki Takamagahara
Y.G. International Academy		Ranpha	Rakshata (Saki Yamakita)	Rebecca	Isabella	Jennifer (Aimi)	Maria	Leo	Yukari Saotome	

== Media ==
=== Anime series ===
A 13-episode anime television series of Love Live! School Idol Project produced by Sunrise, directed by Takahiko Kyōgoku, and written by Jukki Hanada aired in Japan on Tokyo MX from January 6 to March 31, 2013, and was simulcast by Crunchyroll. An original video animation episode was released on November 27, 2013. A second season aired on Tokyo MX from April 6 to June 29, 2014, also airing on TV Aichi, Yomiuri TV, and BS11, and was simulcast by Crunchyroll. Both seasons are licensed in North America by NIS America, who released the premium edition of the first season on Blu-ray on September 2, 2014 and an English dubbed version was released with the standard edition of the first season, along with the premium edition of the second season, on February 14, 2016, as well as the standard edition of the second season on April 12, 2016. The Blu-ray set for season one has since gone out of print and season one was removed from Crunchyroll in 2020, although it has been returned to the streaming service as of March 2023. MVM Entertainment released the first season in the United Kingdom on July 27, 2015, on DVD, with plans to release it on Blu-ray Disc in 2016 with an English dub. MVM Entertainment also released the second season in 2016. Madman Entertainment released the first season in Australia and New Zealand on June 10, 2015, on DVD.

A 13-episode anime television series of Love Live! Sunshine!! produced by Sunrise, directed by Kazuo Sakai, and written by Jukki Hanada aired between July 2 and September 24, 2016, and was simulcast by Crunchyroll. A 13-episode second season aired between October 7 and December 30, 2017. The series is licensed in North America by Funimation, in the United Kingdom by Anime Limited, and in Australia by Madman Entertainment. An English dub by Funimation began streaming from July 30, 2016.

A 13-episode anime television series of Love Live! Nijigasaki High School Idol Club produced by Bandai Namco Filmworks, directed by Tomoyuki Kawamura, and written by Jin Tanaka, aired between October 3 and December 26, 2020. It was also streamed live through the Bandai Channel, Line Live, and YouTube Live. A second season aired between April 2 and June 25, 2022. Nijiyon Animation, an adaptation of the spin-off four-panel manga Nijiyon: Love Live! Nijigasaki Gakuen School Idol Dōkōkai Yon-Koma, was announced on September 18, 2022. It aired between January 6 and March 24, 2023.

Love Live! Superstar!! was announced in 2020 as an anime television series, and aired for 12 episodes between July 11 and October 17, 2021, on NHK Educational TV. A second season aired between July 17 and October 9, 2022. A third season aired between October 6 and December 22, 2024.

Yohane the Parhelion: Sunshine in the Mirror, a fantasy spinoff featuring the cast of Love Live! Sunshine!!, was announced on June 26, 2022. It aired for 13 episodes from July 2 to September 24, 2023.

A television anime series of Love Live! Hasunosora Girls' High School Idol Club is scheduled to premiere on January 10, 2027.

No.	Title	Start date	End date	Eps.	Director
1	Love Live! School Idol Project	January 6, 2013	June 29, 2014	26	Takahiko Kyōgoku
2	Love Live! Sunshine!!	July 2, 2016	December 30, 2017	26	Kazuo Sakai
3	Love Live! Nijigasaki High School Idol Club	October 3, 2020	June 25, 2022	26	Tomoyuki Kawamura
4	Love Live! Superstar!!	July 11, 2021	December 22, 2024	36	Takahiko Kyōgoku
5	Nijiyon Animation	January 6, 2023	June 21, 2024	24	Yūya Horiuchi
6	Yohane the Parhelion: Sunshine in the Mirror	July 2, 2023	September 24, 2023	13	Asami Nakatani

=== Films ===
An animated film titled Love Live! The School Idol Movie was released in theaters on June 13, 2015. The film was released theatrically in South Korea on September 3, 2015, in the United States on September 11, 2015 and in Indonesia on October 21. As of December 2015, the film had been shown in several other countries, including Australia, Brunei, Hong Kong, Malaysia, New Zealand, the Philippines, Singapore, Taiwan, Thailand and Vietnam, and was also scheduled to be released in Canada at the start of 2016. It was released on Blu-ray in Japan on December 15, 2015. The film was released in North America by NIS America on June 28, 2016, in a premium edition, and July 26, 2016, in a standard edition, both with an English dub.

An anime film titled Love Live! Sunshine!! The School Idol Movie: Over the Rainbow was released on January 4, 2019, in Japan. An English dub of the film was released on February 25, 2020. The main staff and cast return to reprise their roles for the film.

A trilogy of theatrical films based on the Love Live! Nijigasaki High School Idol Club began with the first film released in 2024.

No.	Title	Premiere	Runtime	Director
1	Love Live! The School Idol Movie	June 13, 2015	99 minutes	Takahiko Kyōgoku
2	Love Live! Sunshine!! The School Idol Movie: Over the Rainbow	January 4, 2019	100 minutes	Kazuo Sakai
3	Love Live! Nijigasaki High School Idol Club Final Chapter Part 1	September 6, 2024	67 minutes	Tomoyuki Kawamura
4	Love Live! Nijigasaki High School Idol Club Final Chapter Part 2	November 7, 2025	75 minutes	Tomoyuki Kawamura
5	Love Live! Nijigasaki High School Idol Club Final Chapter Part 3	Winter 2027	TBA	Tomoyuki Kawamura

=== Video games ===
Love Live! video games timeline
2013	Love Live! School Idol Festival
2014	Love Live! School Idol Paradise
2015
2016	Love Live! School Idol Festival: After School Activity (arcade)
2017
2018	Puchiguru Love Live!
2019	Love Live! School Idol Festival All Stars
2020
2021	Love Live! School Idol Festival: After School Activity (PS4)
2022
2023	Love Live! School Idol Festival 2: Miracle Live!
2023	Link! Like! Love Live!
2023	Yohane the Parhelion: Blaze in the Deepblue
2024	Yohane the Parhelion: Numazu in the Mirage
2025	Love Live! Nijigasaki High School Idol Club: Tokimeki Roadmap to Future
2025	LoveLive! Superstar!! Memory Collect

Several video games have been developed featuring characters from the Love Live! franchise, primarily consisting of rhythm games, deck-building games, visual novels, or a combination of these genres. The first video game in series, Love Live! School Idol Festival, was released in 2013 for iOS and Android, and marked the first release in the School Idol Festival (Sukufesu) series. This was followed by Love Live! School idol paradise in 2014 for the PlayStation Vita, and Love Live! School Idol Festival: After School Activity, an arcade game released in December 2016 and later ported to the PlayStation 4 in 2021. A spin-off game, Love Live! School Idol Festival All Stars, was launched in 2019, and the most recent installment, Love Live! School Idol Festival 2: Miracle Live!, was released in 2023. Although most these were initially released exclusively in Japan, many were later localised for international markets.

In 2015, Sega introduced the first nesoberi nuigurumi (寝そべりぬいぐるみ) plush toys based on Love Live! characters. In April 2018, these plushies would go on to feature in the tile-matching game Puchiguru Love Live! (ぷちぐるラブライブ!) developed by Pokelabo, Inc for iOS and Android.

In April 2025, Tokimeki Roadmap to the Future (トキメキの未来地図, Tokimeki no Mirai Chizu), developed by Bushiroad Games, was released for Steam and Nintendo Switch.

=== Magazine ===
The front cover of Love Live! Days volume 9, featuring Chika Takami and Honoka Kōsaka

A dedicated Love Live! magazine launched on July 1, 2019, as a spin-off of Dengeki G's Magazine published by ASCII Media Works. Initially untitled, the magazine offered readers the chance to suggest names for the magazine and vote on them, leading to the magazine's title of Love Live! Days starting with volume 3. The magazine offers information on the entire Love Live! franchise including the latest information on school idol groups and media adaptations, and includes serialized Love Live! manga. The magazine also gives fans the ability to influence the franchise by voting on ideas for songs and costumes.

== Sales ==
Love Live! was ranked No. 1 in top-selling physical media franchises in Japan for 2016 and ranked No. 4 in 2015. The franchise's physical media earned over ¥8 billion in 2016 and over ¥5 billion in 2015. This includes the raw yen totals of Blu-ray Discs, DVDs, music CDs, novels, and manga, but not video games, film tickets, digital downloads, and other forms of media sales. In 2013, physical media sales generated ¥2,516.3 million ($26 million) in Japan. DVD and Blu-ray sales of the anime's second season in 2014 sold ¥2,917.5 million ($24 million) in Japan. The franchise's physical media sales generated ¥23 billion ($182 million) in Japan between 2015 and 2018.

The following table lists the annual content revenue from Love Live! media in Japan, as reported by market research firm Hakuhodo.

Year	Content revenue in Japan	Ref
2014	¥42.3 billion ($399 million)	
2015	¥43.9 billion ($363 million)	
2016	¥23.8 billion ($219 million)	
2017	¥27.3 billion ($243 million)	
2018	¥11.4 billion ($103 million)	
2019	Unknown	
2020	¥18.2 billion ($170 million)	
2014 to 2020	¥166.9 billion+ ($1.503 billion+)	
