= Love Live! Nijigasaki High School Idol Club (TV series) =

- Promotional artwork
- No. of episodes: 26

Release
- Original network: Tokyo MX
- Original release: October 3, 2020 – June 25, 2022

Season chronology
- ← Previous; Love Live! Sunshine!! Next → Love Live! Superstar!!

Love Live! Nijigasaki High School Idol Club is an anime television series produced by Sunrise as the third installment in the Love Live! franchise. It is directed by Tomoyuki Kawamura, with Jin Tanaka handling series composition and Takumi Yokota designing the characters. The series follows a group of individual school idols who compete with each other while working together to keep their school idol club alive. Together, they are referred as the Nijigasaki High School Idol Club. The first season aired 13 episodes on Tokyo MX from October 3 to December 26, 2020. A second season aired from April 2 to June 25, 2022. Funimation licensed the series and streams it on their website in North America, Odex in Southeast Asia (except Thailand) and Mongolia, and on AnimeLab in Australia and New Zealand.

For the first season, Nijigasaki High School Idol Club perform both the opening and ending themes, respectively titled "Nijiiro Passions!" (虹色Passions!) and "Neo Sky, Neo Map!" For the second season, Nijigasaki High School Idol Club again perform both the opening and ending themes, titled "Colorful Dreams! Colorful Smiles" and "Yume ga Bokura no Taiyō sa" (夢が僕らの太陽さ).

TV series logo (English)

== Episode list ==
=== Season 1 ===
Overall	Episode	Title (Note: All English titles are taken from Crunchyroll.)	Insert song(s)	Original release date
53	1	"The First Thrill"; Transliteration: "Hajimari no Tokimeki" (Japanese: はじまりのトキメキ)	"Chase!" by Setsuna Yuki (Tomori Kusunoki) "Dream with You" by Ayumu Uehara (Aguri Ōnishi)	October 3, 2020
While having afternoon tea in a park, Ayumu and Yu overhear singing in the area. Coming to the area, they see Setsuna performing "Chase!" in front of an audience which thrills Yu about school idols. Seeing that there is a School Idol Club at Nijigasaki High School, they try to find the club room. However, when they reach the club room, they meet the student council president, Nana, who tells them that the School Idol Club has disbanded. On their way home, Ayumu confesses her love of school idols to Yu and tells her that she wants to start being a school idol. Yu agrees to help Ayumu become a school idol.
54	2	"Cutest♡Girl"; Transliteration: "Cutest♡Gāru" (Japanese: Cutest♡ガール)	"Poppin' Up!" by Kasumi Nakasu (Mayu Sagara)	October 10, 2020
Kasumi sneaks into the student council's office to steal the School Idol Club's nameplate. However, finding that the former School Idol Club room is occupied by another club, she gets caught by Nana who scolds her. Not wanting to give up her School Idol dream though, Kasumi recruits Ayumu and Yu to the club. In a secluded place, Kasumi and Ayumu record their self-introductions to upload onto a streaming site to attract more members. However, Kasumi pushes Ayumu too much to make her self-introduction 'cute' which leaves Ayumu embarrassed. While Kasumi feels troubled by how she forced Ayumu in the self-introduction, Ayumu gets advice from Karin to pitch herself for someone she knows. Realising this, Ayumu goes to Kasumi to record her self-introduction again as her genuine self which was positively received by Yu and Kasumi. Meanwhile, Karin and the other School Idols confront Nana in the student council room where Karin declares that, since they could not find Setsuna Yuki in the student directory, that Setsuna must be Nana. She forces Nana to explain what happened to the School Idol Club.
55	3	"Shouting Your Love"; Transliteration: "Daisuki o Sakebu" (Japanese: 大好きを叫ぶ)	"Dive!" by Setsuna Yuki (Tomori Kusunoki)	October 17, 2020
During the confrontation between Nana, Karin and the other school idols, Nana declares that she quits being a school idol, but lets the others continue preparing for Love Live without her. Nana later meets Yu while she plays the piano in the music room. Here, she explains that she quit being a school idol as she felt that she hurt herself and the others while forcing her ideas onto the others. After a chat with the other school idols, Yu later confronts Nana in the school rooftop to persuade her to come back to the School Idol Club. Yu tells Nana that she wants to see her happy as Setsuna the school idol, persuading her to come back to the School Idol Club. Setsuna reveals her school idol identity to the other students and performs "Dive!" before being welcomed back by the other School Idol Club members.
56	4	"The Uncharted Path"; Transliteration: "Michi Naru Michi" (Japanese: 未知なるミチ)	"Saikō Heart" (サイコーハート, Brave Heart) by Ai Miyashita (Natsumi Murakami)	October 24, 2020
Watching Setsuna's performance on the rooftop inspires Ai and Rina to join the School Idol Club. They try out a few activities such as stretching, singing and a quiz. However, when the school idols discuss solo performances, Ai feels unsure about herself. While running to Odaiba the next morning, Ai meets Emma on the bridge. Emma tells Ai that her presence and positivity has helped the club move forward. From that conversation, Ai realises that she can move forward by having fun with the other school idols which inspires her to perform in the middle of the park. Ai's performance inspires the others to try solo performances in the hope that something amazing will happen.
57	5	"Something I Can Only Do Right Now"; Transliteration: "Ima Shika Dekinai Koto o" (Japanese: 今しかできないことを)	"La Bella Patria" by Emma Verde (Maria Sashide)	October 31, 2020
Seeing the success of Ayumu's self-introduction in collecting views, everyone decides to create their own promotional videos (PVs) as solo idols to introduce themselves. Having been assisted to wear costumes as part of her PV, Emma tries to convince Karin to join the School Idol Club. However, Karin dismisses the idea and tells Emma not to invite her to the School Idol Club again. The next day, Emma reads Karin's questionnaire from a fashion magazine saying that Karin is most interested in school idols. Inspired, Emma spends the afternoon with Karin before she confronts Karin about wanting to know her more. Seeing the doubt about her identity in Karin's face, Emma sings a song for her which inspires Karin to join the School Idol Club. After Emma's PV is uploaded, everyone is amazed by the increasing views and comments of Emma's PV.
58	6	"The Shape of Smiles (⸝⸝>▿<⸝⸝)"; Transliteration: "Egao no Katachi (⸝⸝>▿<⸝⸝)" (Japanese: 笑顔のカタチ（⸝⸝>▿<⸝⸝）)	"Tsunagaru Connect" (ツナガルコネクト) by Rina Tennoji (Chiemi Tanaka)	November 7, 2020
Rina reminisces about when she met Ai while thinking about wanting to connect with more people. When Rina is at the game arcade with Ai, Ayumu and Yu, three of Rina's classmates run into them, and they mention how this venue is often used for school idol concerts, prompting Rina to say she will do a concert here. Encouraged by the other members of the School Idol Club, Rina asks them to help her prepare, and she makes a PV to advertise her upcoming concert. However, Rina is still concerned that she cannot express herself that well when talking to others, believing that she cannot change. When Rina does not show up for practice, the other girls go to her apartment, and Rina opens up to them about her insecurities under a cardboard box, prompting them to cheer her up. This gives Rina the idea to make an electronic monitor that hides her face during the concert. The next morning, her classmates invite her to lunch, and Rina accepts with the use of her "Rina board" notebook.
59	7	"Haruka, Kanata, and Beyond"; Transliteration: "Haruka Kanata" (Japanese: ハルカカナタ)	"Butterfly" by Kanata Konoe (Akari Kitō)	November 14, 2020
Concerned that Kanata is overworking herself, her sister Haruka who is also a school idol at Shinonome Institute comes to check out Nijigasaki's School Idol Club. However, she learns that Kanata has been more sleepy lately, prompting Haruka to say she will quit being a school idol so she can help out Kanata more with the housework. Kanata tries to persuade her not to quit, but Haruka storms out of the clubroom. Haruka talks with the other club members the next day, telling them that she wants to stay in the club while also protecting her sister's happiness. On the day of what was to be Haruka's last performance, she witnesses Kanata perform, and the two sisters reconcile by Kanata suggesting that they support each other from now on both at home and as school idols. Haruka agrees to take over the cooking at home, but she still needs her sister to teach her how to cook.
60	8	"Shizuku, Monochrome"; Transliteration: "Shizuku, Monokurōmu" (Japanese: しずく、モノクローム)	"Solitude Rain" by Shizuku Osaka (Kaori Maeda)	November 21, 2020
Shizuku is told by the president of the Drama Club that she is going to give someone else the lead role for an upcoming play, but Shizuku asks to be given another chance to show she can do it. Kasumi becomes concerned that Shizuku seems gloomier than usual, so she takes her out with Rina to try to cheer her up, but Shizuku tells them not to worry about her. Shizuku continues to worry about revealing her true self to others because she is worried about people not liking her. Rina gives Kasumi the idea to confront Shizuku, telling her that although some people may not like her, she loves everything about her. Shizuku regains the lead role in the play and the performance goes well, including Shizuku's mini concert.
61	9	"Friends but Rivals"; Transliteration: "Nakama de Raibaru" (Japanese: 仲間でライバル)	"Vivid World" by Karin Asaka (Miyu Kubota)	November 28, 2020
Haruka comes to Nijigasaki with Himeno Ayanokōji from Tooh Academy to invite the School Idol Club to Diver Fes, an annual music festival held in Odaiba, that they will also be attending. However, Nijigasaki can only perform one song, and they realize only one girl with have a chance to perform. Karin continues with her modeling work, and runs into Setsuna, Ayumu and Yu while trying to find a dance school to improve on her dance skills. After talking with her, Setsuna suggests they all discuss who will perform at Diver Fes again, with the others choosing Karin. After talking with Himeno on the day of the event, Karin starts to feel insecure about going on stage alone with such a large crowd. The other club members manage to cheer her up by showing her that she is not alone, and Karin pulls off the performance.
62	10	"Summer Begins."; Transliteration: "Natsu, Hajimaru." (Japanese: 夏、はじまる。)	—	December 5, 2020
With the first school term now over, the School Idol Club prepares for a summer training camp at the school. They spend most of the first day cooking dinner, and Kasumi enlists both Shizuku and Rina so they can try to scare the other girls, only for it to backfire on them. Yu talks with Setsuna in the music room about having trouble finding something she loves to do, and on the way back, Ayumu sees them together. The next day, Ai suggests they play tag to break up the monotony of simply jogging, followed by them playing in the pool. Yu tells Ayumu that she will be more courageous and do everything she can for all of the club members. Yu talks to the club members about wanting to organize a school idol festival for various school idol groups.
63	11	"Everyone's Dream, My Dream"; Transliteration: "Minna no Yume, Watashi no Yume" (Japanese: みんなの夢、私の夢)	—	December 12, 2020
Kasumi and Yu present a proposal for the school idol festival to the student council, but there are still some issues with it before it can be approved. The club bands together to fix what they need, starting with deciding on a venue. They also propose the festival to Haruka and Christina from Shinonome Institute, and Himeno and Misaki from Tooh Academy who all agree to participate. The club uses a suggestion box asking other students what kind of festival they would like to see. Meanwhile, Yu continues to work with Setsuna to work out the details for the proposal, something which Ayumu continues to take notice of. Kasumi and Yu later show all student council all of the suggestions they have received, and Yu tells them they have decided to have performances at multiple venues, prompting the student council to give their approval. Ayumu later hears from Setsuna that Yu has gotten better playing the piano. Yu invites Ayumu to her room, and tries to tell her about her plans for the future, but Ayumu worries about Yu becoming more distant from her.
64	12	"Blossoming Feelings"; Transliteration: "Hanahiraku Omoi" (Japanese: 花ひらく思い)	"Awakening Promise" by Ayumu Uehara (Aguri Onishi)	December 19, 2020
Preparations continue for the school idol festival, but Yu remains preoccupied with what Ayumu told her the previous night. The girls start having individual brainstorming meetings with their supporters at school to work out the details for each of their performances and venues. Yu again tries to tell Ayumu that she has found something she wants to do, but Ayumu gets distraught over the thought of Yu spending less time with her as a result. Two days before the festival, the girls go to check out each of their venues. Ayumu reveals to Setsuna that she became a school idol because she wanted Yu to watch her perform, but now she feels like she is distancing herself from Yu due to the support she is receiving from others. However, Setsuna encourages her to see things through to the end. Yu and three of Ayumu's supporters show her the stage they have prepared for her, and Yu reassures her that her feelings for her will not change. Yu later tells her that she wants to play music and plans to transfer to the music course in the next school term.
65	13	"The Place Where Everyone's Dreams Come True(School Idol Festival)"; Transliteration: "Minna no Yume o Kanaeru Basho(Sukūru Aidoru Festibaru)" (Japanese: みんなの夢を叶える場所(スクールアイドルフェスティバル))	"Yume ga Koko Kara Hajimaru yo" (夢がここからはじまるよ, Our Dreams Begin Here) by Nijigasaki High School Idol Club	December 26, 2020
The School Idol Club girls offer to help Yu prepare for her music exam so she can transfer to the music course. The school idol festival begins with each of the girls performing at each of their stages. It starts to rain after the end of the festival, resulting in a cancellation of the remaining performances. The rain stops after closing time at 7 p.m., but the vice president of the student council convinces the school to allow for one more performance with the entire Nijigasaki High School Idol Club. News of the festival spreads online, prompting other school idols groups to contact Nijigasaki about participating in the next one. Meanwhile, Yu sits down to take the music exam.

=== Season 2 ===
Overall	Episode	Title	Insert song(s)	Original release date
78 (Note: The first season of Love Live! Superstar!! aired between the first and second seasons of Love Live! Nijigasaki High School Idol Club.)	14	"A Brand New Thrill"; Transliteration: "Atarashii Tokimeki" (Japanese: 新しいトキメキ)	"Eutopia" by Lanzhu Zhong (Akina Houmoto)	April 2, 2022
Lanzhu and Mia arrive in Japan, while the School Idol Club starts creating a promotional video for the 2nd School Idol Festival. Lanzhu later arrives at Nijigasaki High School, stating her interest in becoming a school idol before meeting the rest of the Club. Then, the School Idol Club members, plus Lanzhu and Mia go to watch the promotional video. However, an outtake reel was played instead. Due to this, Lanzhu decides to perform "Eutopia" in a balcony of the school to fanfare. After the performance, Lanzhu states to the School Idol Club that she plans to enter the Festival on her own instead due to conflicting values, and starts a competition to see who garners the most attention in the event.
79	15	"Overlapping Colors"; Transliteration: "Kasanaru Iro" (Japanese: 重なる色)	—	April 9, 2022
The School Idol Club discusses details of the upcoming joint concert with Y.G. International Academy, after which they meet with Lanzhu, who reaffirms her stance on performing separately from the Club. Later, Mia is revealed to be from a family of composers, and she explains that she only has a work relationship with Lanzhu. Kasumi, Kanata, Emma and Rina later decide to stalk Lanzhu to watch her next performance, and after her performance was finished, Lanzhu finds and invites the four to her apartment, where she reveals that she wanted to be a school idol to be the center of attention. After the conversation, the four students start planning a way to convince Lanzhu to join the Club, eventually deciding on performing together as a subunit during the Joint Concert.
80	16	"Sing! Song! Smile!"	"Enjoy It!" by Qu4rtz	April 16, 2022
One week before the 2nd School Idol Festival; Kasumi, Kanata, Emma and Rina decide to hold sleepovers to brainstorm their performance. The next day, Mia and Yu are assigned to compose a song in class. Meanwhile, Shioriko proposes merging the Culture Festival and the School Idol Festival in a student council meeting, after which Lanzhu tells Shioriko that she planned to organize a larger event, and that she will go to the Joint Concert. The next night, Kasumi, after failing to find ideas for the performance, begins to doubt performing as a subunit. The next day, other members encourage Yu to find her direction after she complains about her assignment. Then, on the last night, the four successfully find out about themselves by describing others, and on the day of the Joint Performance, they announce the name of their subunit, "Qu4rtz" and perform "Enjoy It!" Yu then performs her finished assignment on piano in class the next day.
81	17	"Ai Love Triangle"; Transliteration: "Ai Rabu Toraianguru" (Japanese: アイ Love Triangle)	"Eternal Light" by DiverDiva	April 23, 2022
Ai meets Karin at a shopping mall, where Karin notices Misato Kawamoto, Ai's neighbor. Ai then invites Karin to go together with them. Misato then tells Karin that she was in and out of the hospital lately. Ai later says that Misato used to play with her, and that she wanted to return the favor. Meanwhile, the student council merges the 2nd School Idol Festival with the Culture Festival, with Shioriko managing both events. That evening, Misato tells Ai that she gave her hope when she was ill, and that seeing Ai doing something she wanted made her lose hope. The next day, Ai thinks about quitting until Karin begins musing about taking over her fan base, causing her to reconsider. Ai then asks Karin to perform together to compete on the same stage. On the day of the performance, Misato regrets what she said to Ai before watching the unit, now named "DiverDiva" perform "Eternal Light". After the performance, Misato says that she was moved, and later tells Karin that she wants to be like her.
82	18	"Dreamland Is Now Open!↑↑(*'▽')"; Transliteration: "Kaimaku! Dorīmurando↑↑(*'▽')" (Japanese: 開幕！ドリームランド↑↑(*'▽'))	—	April 30, 2022
Shioriko arranges a pre-show by the drama club for the day before the cultural fair. Later, Shizuku tells Yu that she wants to be in a unit with Ayumu and Setsuna. The next morning, Ayumu and Setsuna follow Yu and Shizuku after finding them together. Meanwhile, Shizuku hands a script, inspired by Ayumu and Setsuna, to Yu. However, she cannot assign roles for the play. After arriving, Yu and Shizuku buy tickets to an exhibit about school idols and notice Ayumu and Setsuna. They then find out about Shizuku's play and agree to perform it. The four then enter the exhibit. After leaving, they find Lanzhu, who tells Yu that she should take her studies seriously and that her dreams only overlap with those of the club. However, Shizuku thinks that Lanzhu's lecture also applies to her. Setsuna and Ayumu then encourage her and ad-lib Shizuku's play until they struggle to continue, causing Shizuku to walk in and help them. Shizuku realizes that expressing themselves is important to being a school idol, and Ayumu later tells Yu that she thought she couldn't be in a unit until she performed with Setsuna and Shizuku.
83	19	"Choose Your 'Love'"; Transliteration: "'Daisuki' no Sentaku o" (Japanese: "大好き"の選択を)	"Infinity! Our Wings!!" by A・Zu・Na	May 7, 2022
Setsuna hesitates revealing her identity as Nana Nakagawa, the Student Council President, as she thinks her personas should be kept separate. Later, Nana finds out that the School Idol Festival has too many applicants, and decides to postpone the event. After this, the School Idol Club finds Setsuna and asks her to let them help solve the problem. The next day, the Student Council holds a meeting with other schools, where Nana finds out that the other schools' cultural festivals will happen on the same week as Nijigasaki's. Because of this, she decides to host the School Idol Festival together with other schools. Meanwhile, on the night before the Festival at Nana's home, she reveals her identity as Setsuna Yuki to her mother and on the day of the 2nd School Idol Festival, Nana reveals herself to be Setsuna Yuki and performs together with Ayumu and Shizuku as A・Zu・Na.
84	20	"The Memory of Dreams"; Transliteration: "Yume no Kioku" (Japanese: 夢の記憶)	"Emotion" by Shioriko Mifune (Moeka Koizumi)	May 14, 2022
The 2nd School Idol Festival begins. During their time at Shion Academy, the club learns of Kaoruko's past as a school idol, and how Shioriko, her younger sister, looked up to her, hoping to be a school idol herself. But due to Kaoruko not making it into the Love Live! competition, Shioriko vowed to never fall into that same trap. However, thanks to encouragement from the Club, and her sister telling the truth of her retirement, she regains her passion. Shioriko then takes the stage and performs "Emotion".
85	21	"The Place Where the Rainbow Begins(Tokimeki Runners)"; Transliteration: "Niji ga Hajimaru Basho(Tokimeki Runners)" (Japanese: 虹が始まる場所(TOKIMEKI Runners))	"Queendom" by Lanzhu Zhong (Akina Houmoto) "Tokimeki Runners (TV Anime Insert Song ver.)" by Nijigasaki High School Idol Club	May 21, 2022
The last day of the 2nd School Idol Festival begins, however, Yu still cannot write a song for the Festival's closing performance. Later, the Nagashi Somen Club sends a boat through a water slider track, with plans to begin Lanzhu's performance after it finishes. Meanwhile, Yu is unable to think of a song for the Club's performance and explains that she cannot express each member while pleasing their fans. The other members then encouraged her to not overthink the song. Later, the water slider fails to reach its destination, but Lanzhu begins her performance anyway. After the performance, Yu laments the quality of Lanzhu's performance, but Mia suggests that making a song for the School Idol Club will please the audience as well. Yu then says that she wants to perform together with the Club. That evening, Yu begins the final performance by playing the piano, before transitioning to the rest of the Club performing "Tokimeki Runners".
86	22	"The Sky I Can't Reach"	"Stars We Chase" by Mia Taylor (Shu Uchida)	May 28, 2022
Lanzhu decides to go back to Hong Kong, shocking the School Idol Club. Mia then goes to Lanzhu's apartment, where Lanzhu explains that she has done everything she wanted. Mia then decides to write one more song for Lanzhu. Later, Mia shows the song to Lanzhu, but she says that it's not fit for her, angering Mia. Rina then sees Mia, who says that she wants her songs to be recognized, that she loves singing and that she doesn't want to disappoint her family. Rina then tells her to write a song for herself to sing. A few days later, Lanzhu says that she will leave that evening, and everyone rushes to the airport. There, Mia tries to convince her to not go home, then performs "Stars We Chase" for Lanzhu. Lanzhu then says that she wants to be a solo idol because she is unable to be friends with anyone. The others then encourage Lanzhu and say that she was important to the School Idol Club. After this, Lanzhu, Mia and Shioriko joins the School Idol Club.
87	23	"Kasumin☆Wonder Tour"; Transliteration: "Kasumin☆Wandā Tsuā" (Japanese: かすみん☆ワンダーツアー)	"Love U My Friends (TV Anime Insert Song ver.)" by Nijigasaki High School Idol Club	June 4, 2022
Lanzhu, Mia and Shioriko are welcomed to the School Idol Club. Kasumi then invites the Club to go on a trip to show that she is still the Club president. Kasumi plans multiple activities on the trip, hoping to show herself off, but all end in failure. The next day, Rina creates a game for the group to play while they walk around the city. Later, everyone had made progress except for Lanzhu, Shioriko and Kasumi, who decide to work together, to no avail. Later, after being questioned by Shioriko, Lanzhu says that she wants to take a photo with the Club, and Shioriko suggests taking one with her first. While taking the photo, they both realize that they have made progress in the game. After the game ends, Yu, the winner of the game, asks the rest of the Club to come up with lyrics for her song as her prize. That night, the Club writes lyrics for what eventually becomes "Love U My Friends".
88	24	"The Past, the Future, and Now"; Transliteration: "Kako Mirai Ima" (Japanese: 過去・未来・イマ)	—	June 11, 2022
The School Idol Club discusses being an official club. However, they decide to postpone the decision to after exams. The Club then decides to hold a study session together, while also discussing competing in the Love Live. That evening, after Kasumi asks them, the School Idol Club decides not to be an official club. The next day, Karin notices the others' growth, and becomes depressed. Emma and Kanata then talk to her, and she explains that the third-years don't have much time left in school. Emma and Kanata then say that she should enjoy the present. After this, Karin messages the other members about an idea for the event, causing the others to find Karin and decide on planning a solo concert.
89	25	"Cheer!"; Transliteration: "Ēru!" (Japanese: エール！)	—	June 18, 2022
The School Idol Club plans and discusses details for their first concert during New Year's Eve. Later, Yu and Ayumu tell Kanata separately that they want to follow their dreams, but are afraid of being separated from each other. That evening, students from Shinonome Academy express their desire to support Haruka in the Love Live! preliminaries, and Kanata explains her plan. The next day, Kanata also tells her plan to the rest of the Club, and they help her. On the day of the competition, Kanata and students from other schools give everyone a message of encouragement by video call. Ayumu later tells Yu she will go on an exchange program, and Yu tells Ayumu she will join the composition competition. The next day, Yu tells the Club that she wrote a solo song for everyone.
90	26	"Let This Thrill Resonate—."; Transliteration: "Hibike! Tokimeki—." (Japanese: 響け！ときめき――。)	"Future Parade" by Nijigasaki High School Idol Club	June 25, 2022
The School Idol Club's first concert begins, with every member performing a song. During the intermission, Yu, to her surprise, receives a flower stand from her fans with encouraging messages inside. She then realizes that even if she wasn't an idol, she still is important to the Club. Shortly before the final performance, Yu, in the audience, loudly proclaims her love for the Club and makes a speech about how the Club is always there for everyone. She then goes on stage as the audience thanks them. The performance, "Future Parade", then begins. After the concert, the Club members get along with each other and follow their dreams.
OVA	OVA	"Love Live! Nijigasaki High School Idol Club NEXT SKY"; Transliteration: "Rabu Raibu! Nijigasaki Gakuen Sukūru Aidoru Dōkō-kai NEXT SKY" (Japanese: ラブライブ！虹ヶ咲学園スクールアイドル同好会 NEXT SKY)	"Feel Alive" by R3birth "Go Our Way!" by Nijigasaki High School Idol Club	June 23, 2023
R3birth, a subunit consisting of Shioriko, Mia, and Lanzhu, has been gaining popularity with each performance. However, Shioriko's stiff and formal personality fails to excite the crowd, making her wonder if she should continue being a school idol. Ayumu returns from her exchange program in the United Kingdom accompanied by Isla, a British student who had invited her to study abroad. Isla is interested in becoming an idol but was unable to garner support in her home country, so the club introduces her to Japan's idol culture and has her perform with them. Although she enjoys her time in Japan, Isla decides to return home after her request to form a school idol club in Britain is denied. The club members intervene and convince her not to give up on her aspirations, after which they point out to Shioriko that her selfless nature is befitting that of a school idol's.

=== Nijigasaki High School Idol Club The Movie: Final Chapter ===
No.	Title	Insert song(s)	Original release date
1	"Part 1"	"Rise Up High!" by Shizuku Osaka "Dream Mermaid" by Kanata Konoe "Cara Tesoro" by Emma Verde "Phoenix" by Lanzhu Zhong "Stellar Stream" by Ayumu Uehara	September 6, 2024
The club enters the School Idol Grand Prix (GPX), a competition in which the most popular school idol is awarded a stadium concert. The GPX doubles as a promotion for a live streaming mobile app, which is used by contestants to record their performances or promotional videos and garner fan votes. Ayumu, Emma, Kanata, Kasumi, Lanzhu, and Shizuku visit Okinawa Prefecture, one of the host sites for the GPX. Besides streaming, the six also go sightseeing. Emma befriends Ten Akamine, a sanshin player who wants to become a school idol alongside her friend Koito Ishimine but had a falling out after a poor debut performance; Ten partners with Emma for the latter's GPX song entry, which encourages her and Koito to make amends. Lanzu's mother, a GPX sponsor, tries to accommodate the participants with better lodging and an additional stage but is mistaken for rigging the vote in her daughter's favor. After Kasumi better understands and rectifies the situation, she and the GPX staff build the stage. While pleased with her handiwork, Kasumi realizes she has yet to film her own performance.
2	"Part 2"	"Itoshiki Yume yo Izanaite" by Shioriko Mifune "Cheer Mode" by A.L.A.N. "Like a Teasure" by Mia Taylor "Stay" by Rina Tennoji "Burn!!" by Setsuna Yuki "Circle of Love" by Ai Miyashita	November 7, 2025
Ai, Karin, Mia, Rina, Setsuna, and Shioriko visit the Kansai region, going to cities like Kyoto and Osaka where other GPX entrants are sightseeing or performing. Before she could perform her entry, Mia encounters her older sister and GPX spokeswoman Chloe, who urges her to return home so their family could properly train her as a singer. Her fear of not living up to the Taylors' expectations clashes with her desire to finish her high school life as a school idol, and she considers withdrawing from Nijigasaki. Rina disguises herself as A.L.A.N., a mysterious and helmeted singer, to write a song to motivate Mia and hacks into the GPX's streams to display her performance. While Mia is encouraged by Rina during their next meeting at Umeda Sky Building, the hijacking causes the GPX servers to go offline, forcing the tournament to be canceled. Setsuna is despondent by the news, fearing it spells the end of her time as an idol. When she questions the integrity of her idol persona, Ai reassures her that Setsuna is a genuine part of her as Nana is. The club creates their own impromptu competition that leads to the GPX's revival with an additional round.
