= Date (surname) =

Date (伊達, [date]; 'gallantry' or 'showy') is a Japanese surname. It is also a Maharashtrian surname from India with a similar pronunciation. It can refer to:

== Japanese people ==
- Date clan, a lineage of daimyōs who controlled northern Japan in the late 16th century and into the Edo period
  - Date Tanemune (伊達 稙宗, 1488–1565), Japanese samurai
  - Date Harumune (伊達 晴宗, 1519–1577), Japanese daimyō
  - Date Masamune (伊達 政宗, 1567–1636), Japanese leader
  - Date Tadamune (伊達 忠宗, 1599–1658), Japanese samurai
  - Date Tsunamune (伊達 綱宗, 1640–1711), Japanese samurai
  - Date Tsunamura (伊達 綱村, 1659–1719), Japanese samurai
  - Date Yoshikuni (伊達 慶邦, 1825–1874), Japanese samurai
- A branch of the Date Clan where the heads of the Uwajima Domain, in the former Iyo Province of Japan (present-day Ehime Prefecture) on the south-eastern island of Shikoku
  - Date Hidemune (伊達 秀宗, 1591–1658), Japanese daimyō; first-born son (by concubine) of Masamune Date
  - Date Munenari (伊達 宗城, 1818–1892), Japanese leader
- Arisa Date (伊達 朱里紗, born 1991), Japanese voice actress
- Ayumi Date (伊達 あゆみ, born 1965), Japanese/American architect and designer
- Kimiko Date (伊達 公子, born 1970), Japanese professional tennis player
- Koji Date (伊達 幸志, born 1987), Japanese actor and singer
- Masashi Date (伊達 昌司, born 1975), Japanese baseball player
- Mikio Date (伊達 みきお, born 1974), Japanese comedian
- Miwako Date (伊達 美和子, born 1971), Japanese businesswoman
- Sayuri Date (伊達 さゆり, born 2002), Japanese voice actress

== Fictional Japanese characters ==
- Eiji Date in the manga/anime series Fighting Spirit (Hajime no Ippo)
- Sage Date in the anime series Ronin Warriors
- Kyosuke Date in SoulTaker
- Kenta Date in Denji Sentai Megaranger
- Akiko Date in the Young Samurai book series
- Naoto Date in the manga and anime series Tiger Mask
- Akira Date (伊達 明) in Kamen Rider OOO
- Ryuusei Date in Super Robot Wars
- Wataru Date in Case Closed
- Kyoko Date (伊達 杏子), a virtual idol
- Kaname Date in the video game AI: The Somnium Files
- Soma Date in Orient (manga)

== Other people ==
- Christopher J. Date, author and researcher in relational database technology
- Terry Date, an American record producer
- Arun Date, a Marathi singer

== See also ==
- Date (disambiguation), other uses of the word "date"
