= Date =

Date or dates most often refers to:

- Date, the fruit of the date palm (Phoenix dactylifera)
- Jujube, also known as red date or Chinese date, the fruit of Ziziphus jujuba

Date or dates may also refer to:

== Social activity ==
- Dating, a form of courtship involving social activity, with the aim of assessing a potential partner
  - Group dating
  - First date
  - Blind date
- Meeting, when two or more people come together

== Chronology ==
- Calendar date, a day on a calendar
- Date (metadata), a representation term to specify a calendar date
  - DATE command, a system time command for displaying the current date
- Chronological dating, attributing to an object or event a date in the past
  - Radiometric dating, dating materials such as rocks in which trace radioactive impurities were incorporated when they were formed

== Arts, entertainment and media ==
=== Music ===
- Date (band), a Swedish dansband
- "Date" (song), 2009, from Mr. Houston
- Date Records, a subsidiary of Columbia Records

=== Film and television ===
- "Date" (Miranda), 2009 British sitcom episode
- Dates (TV series), a British romantic drama series
- "Dates" (Only Fools and Horses), a 1988 episode of the BBC sitcom
- "The Date" (The Amazing World of Gumball), an episode of the British-American animated series
- Date Bhet, a 2023 Indian Marathi-language film

== Places ==
- Date, Fukushima, Japan
- Date District, Fukushima, Japan
- Date, Hokkaido, Japan
- Date, South Dakota, US
- Dateland, Arizona, US

== Other uses ==
- Date (surname), a family name in Japan and elsewhere, including a list of people with the name
- Date clan, a Japanese samurai kin group
- Date FM, a radio station in Miyagi Prefecture, Japan
- Design Automation and Test in Europe, a yearly conference on electronic design automation

== See also ==
- Blind date (disambiguation)
- Dating (disambiguation)
- Double date (disambiguation)
- Mystery Date (disambiguation)
