= Blind Date =

Blind Date or Blind Dating may refer to:

- Blind date, a romantic meeting between two people who have never met before

== Films ==
- Blind Date (1934 film), directed by Roy William Neill
- Blind Date (1959 film), directed by Joseph Losey
- Blind Date (1984 film), directed by Nico Mastorakis
- Blind Date (1987 film), directed by Blake Edwards
- Blind Date (1996 film), directed by Theo van Gogh
- Blind Date (2007 film), directed by Stanley Tucci
- Blind Date (2015 film), directed by Clovis Cornillac
- Blind Dates, 2013 Georgian film
- Blind Dating, 2006 film directed by James Keach
- The Blind Date (film), a 2021 Ugandan film

== Television ==
=== Series ===
- Blind Date (American game show), American dating game show based on the 1940s radio version
- Blind Date (American TV series), American dating game show that started airing in 1999
- Blind Date (Australian game show), Australian television game show
- Blind Date (British game show), British dating game show
- The Blind Date (TV series), British crime drama

=== Episodes ===
- "Blind Date" (30 Rock), 2006
- "Blind Date" (Angel), 2000
- "Blind Date" (Roswell), 2000
- "Blind Date" (The Upper Hand), 1992
- "Blind Dates" (Saved by the Bell), 1990

== Other uses ==
- Blind Date (band), musical group
- Blind Date (novel), 1986 novel by R. L. Stine
- Blind Date (radio series), 1943–1946 American radio program
- "Blind Date", 1950 Billboard-charting song sung by Margaret Whiting and Bob Hope
- Blind Date, 1977 novel by Jerzy Kosiński
- Blind Date, art piece by John Duncan

== See also ==
- Blind (disambiguation)
- Date (disambiguation)
- Dating (disambiguation)
- The Dating Game
