= Kona Tsukine =

Japanese singer and voice actress (born 2003)

- 月音 こな
- Born: 20 August 2003 (age 23)
- Occupations: Singer; voice actress
- Years active: 2023–present
- Notable work: Megumi Fujishima in Love Live! Hasunosora Girls' High School Idol Club
- Musical career
- Genre: J-pop
- Instrument: Voice
- Member of: Hasunosora Girls' High School Idol Club; LustQueen

Kona Tsukine (Japanese: 月音 こな, Hepburn: Tsukine Kona; born 20 August 2003), originally known as Koto Miura (三浦 瑚都, Miura Koto) until 2022, is a Japanese singer and voice actress from Kanagawa Prefecture, affiliated with Apollo Bay. She stars as Megumi Fujishima in Love Live! Hasunosora Girls' High School Idol Club, and she and Yuina are part of the duo LustQueen.

== Biography ==
Kona Tsukine, a native of Kanagawa Prefecture, was born on 20 August 2003. She entered the entertainment industry after participating in a child actor audition held by Amuse during her upper elementary school years. While in junior high school, she was part of the Oshiri Tantei Kodomo Chorus, who performed the children chorus version of the theme song Puputto Fumutto Kaiketsu Dance released in June 2018.

Tsukine, still known as Koto Miura, was a founding member of Amuse Inc. subsidiary Apollo Bay in 2020. On 2 April 2022, it was announced that she would change her name from Koto Miura to Kona Tsukine. She had chosen her stage name in consultation with her parents; her given name came from a dog she once owned, and her surname combined her love for the moon and her profession's use of sound and voice.

In February 2023, it was announced that Tsukine would star as Megumi Fujishima in the Love Live! Hasunosora Girls' High School Idol Club sub-franchise, including the game Link! Like! Love Live!. Having become interested in Love Live! after attending a μ's concert with her father during elementary school, she had made two unsuccessful auditions for the franchise prior to Hasunosora. In an interview, she admitted that she would "either get a job or go to college" if she failed, but also that she had forgotten to apply for the university entrance exam in the excitement over her Hasunosora audition. She is a member of the unit Mira-Cra Park!, who have had five of its releases reach the Oricon Singles Chart Top 10. She reprised her role as Megumi in the sub-franchise's Bloom: Garden Party film.

In May 2026, Tsukine joined LustQueen—the solo artist project of fellow Love Live! alumna Yuina—making it a duo. Tomokazu Nishihiro of Spice said that her singing "conveyed inner strength despite its crystalline clarity" and "blended harmoniously" with Yuina's. In June 2026, she joined Charamix, a multimedia project co-created by Kentaro Yabuki and Keisuke Makino, as Muna; on the decision to hire her for Charamix, Yabuki said that he "felt a real sense of connection" in the presence of Radical 74 (which is moon in Japanese) in both her surname and the final kanji of his own given name. On 20 August 2026, she held a solo event at Zepp Haneda, where she had a cafe where three lottery-selected fans would act as her butlers, and where she announced her solo photobook debut. That photobook, Hitotoki (ひととき; lit. "One Moment"), will be released on 9 December 2026; it was shot in Okinawa despite the area being hit by typhoon season.

Tsukine has been practicing nihon-buyō since the age of two and holds a certification in the art. She is also self-taught in guitar, a hobby she took up because she found "going to karaoke a hassle".

== Discography ==
=== Animated film ===
Year	Title	Role	Ref.
2025	Love Live! Hasunosora Girls' High School Idol Club Bloom: Garden Party	Megumi Fujishima	

=== Video games ===
Year	Title	Role	Ref.
2023	Link! Like! Love Live!	Megumi Fujishima	
