= Nagisa Aoyama =

Japanese voice actress and singer

- 青山 なぎさ
- Born: 16 May 1998 (age 28); Tokyo, Japan
- Occupations: Voice actress, actress, singer
- Years active: 2021–present
- Agent: Crocodile
- Notable work: Love Live! Superstar!! as Ren Hazuki; Synduality: Noir as Ciel
- Height: 155 cm (5 ft 1 in)
- Musical career
- Occupations: J-Pop; Anison
- Instrument: Vocals
- Years active: 2023–present
- Labels: Launch Vehicle (2023–2025); Gree Entertainment (2026–present)
- Member of: Liella!

Nagisa Aoyama (Japanese: 青山 なぎさ, Hepburn: Aoyama Nagisa; born 16 May 1998) is a Japanese voice actress and singer affiliated with Crocodile, known for voicing Ren Hazuki in Love Live! Superstar!! and Ciel in Synduality: Noir. She is a member of the idol unit Liella!.

== Biography ==
Nagisa Aoyama was born on 16 May 1998. Although she was a native of Tokyo, Aoyama lived briefly in Hokkaido as a child. She later studied at Chuo University.

As a young child, Aoyama performed for Tani Momoko Ballet. She participated in the 2019 Miss Circle Contest, where she won the Semi-Grand Prix under the name Nagisa Saitō (斎藤 渚, Saitō Nagisa).

In December 2020, Aoyama was announced as a cast member in Love Live! Superstar!! (a multimedia project in the Love Live! franchise), having passed an open audition; as part of the project, she voices the character Ren Hazuki as a member of the idol group Liella!.

In September 2022, she was cast as Ciel, a character in Synduality: Noir. In February 2023, Aoyama appeared in the music video of her Love Live! Superstar!! co-star Liyuu's song "Yellow". In March 2023, her Niconico Channel Plus radio show, Aoyama Nagisa no Katte ni IMO Kyōkai (青山なぎさの勝手にIMO協会, lit.Nagisa Aoyama's Sweet potato association call myself), won the Best Benefit Radio Award at the 8th Aniradi Awards. In May 2023, she performed the CrosSing project's cover version of "Akuma no Ko", the ending theme of the fourth season of Attack on Titan. In June 2023, she was cast as Hijiri Nojima in the October 2023 stage play adaptation of Kageki Shojo!!.

On 16 May 2024, it was officially announced that she would make her solo artist debut via Launch Vehicle, when she celebrated her 26th birthday, She released her first single, "Kaihou" (解放, lit. 'Release') on the same day. Her second single, "Kimito", was released a month later.

On 4 December 2025, she announced that she would depart Apollo Bay on 31 December, and that her contract with Launch Vehicle would be terminated the same day.

== Filmography ==
=== Anime ===
2021

- Love Live! Superstar!!, Ren Hazuki

2022

- Love Live! Superstar!! 2nd Season, Ren Hazuki

2023

- Synduality: Noir, Ciel

2024

- Synduality: Noir Part 2, Ciel
- Love Live! Superstar!! 3rd Season, Ren Hazuki

=== Stage ===
2024

- Kageki Shojo!!, Hijiri Nojima
