= Double date (disambiguation) =

A double date or group date is a romantic or social activity involving more than one couple.

Double date or double dating may also refer to:

- Double Date (1941 film), a 1941 American comedy film
- Double Date (2017 film), a British horror-comedy film
- "Double Date" (Blossom), a 1994 television episode
- "Double Date" (Call Me Kat), a 2021 television episode
- "Double Date" (Dawson's Creek), a 1998 television episode
- "Double Date" (Gilmore Girls), a 2001 television episode
- "Double Date" (Grimm), a 2015 television episode
- "Double Date" (How I Met Your Mother), a 2009 television episode
- "Double Date" (Justice League Unlimited), a 2005 television episode
- "Double Date" (The Office), a 2009 television episode
- Dual dating or double dating, in historical materials, the practice of recording an event according to more than one (usually two) dating system or calendar

== See also ==
- Date (disambiguation)
- Old Style and New Style dates, 18th-century changes in calendar conventions
