= Akina Homoto =

Japanese voice actress

- 法元 明菜
- Born: August 5, 1996 (age 30); Tottori Prefecture, Japan
- Other names: Houmin; MinMin
- Occupations: Voice actress; singer
- Years active: 2018–present
- Agent: Just Production
- Notable work: Love Live! Nijigasaki High School Idol Club as Lanzhu Zhong
- Height: 153 cm (5 ft 0 in)

YouTube information
- Channel: あきなさんち
- Years active: 2018–present
- Genres: Gaming; Culture
- Subscribers: 32.3 thousand
- Views: 2.09 million
- Last updated: 16 September 2025
- Website: 法元 明菜 - 株式会社ジャストプロ オフィシャルWEBSITE

Akina Homoto (法元 明菜, Hōmoto Akina; born August 5, 1996) is a Japanese voice actress from Osaka. She is currently affiliated with Just Production. Homoto is best known for her role as Lanzhu Zhong in Love Live! Nijigasaki High School Idol Club.

== Early life ==
Homoto was born in Tottori Prefecture. She grew up in Chiba, Guangdong, and Osaka. Homoto is a hāfu, with a Japanese father and a Chinese mother. Her father wanted her to learn Chinese, so they lived in Guangdong from 2004 to 2012, where she used her Chinese name, Yang Ming (楊明; Yáng Míng).Homoto speaks with her family using a mix of Chinese and Japanese.

After Homoto graduated from high school, she gave up on going to university and went to Tokyo alone with 100,000 yen to pursue her dream of being a voice actress.

== Career ==
Since she lived China from 2004 to 2012, Homoto can speak Mandarin fluently, and also knows some Cantonese. For that reason, she debuted in Live Animation Heart X Algorhythm, playing a Chinese character named Linlin, through audition hosted on Line.

In 2020, Homoto started her YouTube channel, holding weekly livestreams. The stream usually includes chatting, letter reading, Chinese teaching and guitar segments.

Apart from being the voice actress for the Lanzhu Zhong character in Love Live! Nijigasaki High School Idol Club, she is also a staff member under the sound cooperation unit in Love Live! Superstar!!. She helps translate Chinese and Japanese between Liyuu and the director.

== Filmography ==
=== Television anime ===
- Dropkick on My Devil! (2018–2020, Sister, Skull)
- Love Live! Superstar!! (2021, Sound cooperation)
- Gunma-chan (2021–2023, Honey Work D)
- Love Live! Nijigasaki High School Idol Club 2nd Season (2022, Lanzhu Zhong)
- Nijiyon Animation (2023, Lanzhu Zhong)
- Chiikawa (2023, Gray's children)

=== Web anime ===
- Live Animation Heart × Algorhythm (2018–2019, Linlin, Kiilin)

=== Video games ===
- Love Live! School Idol Festival All Stars (2020–2023, Lanzhu Zhong)
- Azur Lane (2022–present, Harbin)
