= Aguri Ōnishi =

Japanese actress

- 大西 亜玖璃
- Born: May 2, 1997 (age 29); Aichi Prefecture, Japan
- Other names: Agupon; Agumeeshon
- Occupations: Actress; voice actress; singer
- Years active: 2011–present
- Agent: Ancheri
- Height: 160.5 cm (5 ft 3 in)
- Musical career
- Genres: J-Pop; Anison
- Instrument: Vocals
- Years active: 2021–present
- Label: Nippon Columbia
- Website: columbia.jp/onishiaguri/

Aguri Ōnishi (大西 亜玖璃, Ōnishi Aguri; born May 2, 1997) is a Japanese actress, voice actress and singer. She is managed by Ancheri

== Career ==
In 2011, Ōnishi had a starring role in NHK's Junior High School Diaries (中学生日記 転校生シリーズ「僕と君のメロディ」, Chūgakusei Nikki Tenkōsei Shirizu "Boku to Kimi no Melody"). In 2013 Junior High School Diaries won an International Emmy Kids Award in the series category.

Ōnishi was a finalist in the 13th Japan Bishojo Contest in 2012, which led to her becoming part of an idol group called X21. The group was made up of all of the other finalists from the contest. They began performing in January 2013. She graduated from both X21 and the production agency Oscar Promotion on April 16, 2017.

She began working with Link Plan in July 2017, after completing Pro-Fit's training course. Ōnishi made her debut as a voice actress later that year as Miu Ichinose in the YomeKura drama CD. She was also announced to be the voice of Ayumu Uehara in Love Live's "Perfect Dream Project" idol group, which would be later known as Nijigasaki High School Idol Club.

From 2019 to November 14, 2020, she was a member of the voice actress unit Prima Porta.

On November 22, 2020, it was announced that Ōnishi will be making her debut as a solo singer under Nippon Columbia, with the release of her first single, "Honjitsu wa Seiten Nari" (本日は晴天なり), on March 3, 2021.

== Personal life ==
Ōnishi's hobbies are reading, karaoke, and playing the alto saxophone.

== Filmography ==
=== TV dramas ===
- Junior High School Diaries (中学生日記) (2011) as herself
- Saki (2016-2017) as Satomi Kanbara

=== Movies ===
- Saki (2017) as Satomi Kanbara

=== Anime ===
- Ms. Koizumi Loves Ramen Noodles (2018) as Female Student C
- Tada Never Falls in Love (2018) as Female Student
- Caligula (2018) as Elementary School Student
- Afterlost (2019) as Rena
- Love Live! Nijigasaki High School Idol Club (2020) as Ayumu Uehara
- Maesetsu! (2020) as Fubuki Kitakaze
- Love Live! Nijigasaki High School Idol Club 2nd Season (2022) as Ayumu Uehara
- Don't Hurt Me, My Healer! (2022) as Carla
- Kuro no Shoukanshi (2022) as Beth
- The 100 Girlfriends (2023) as Librarian
- Loner Life in Another World (2024) as Merielle
- Seirei Gensouki: Spirit Chronicles Season 2 (2024) as Masato Sendō

=== Video games ===
- PlayStation All-Stars Battle Royale (2012) as Toro Inoue
- Shironeko Project (2018) as Danby
- Love Live! School Idol Festival All Stars (2019) as Ayumu Uehara
- Magia Record (2020) as Sunao Toki
- Ys X: Nordics (2023) as Ashley

=== Drama CD ===
- YomeKura (2017) as Miu Ichinose
