= Blind Date (band) =

- Origin: Germany
- Genres: German Pop
- Years active: 1980s

Blind Date was a German pop music group formed in 1984, originally consisting of Uwe Schlürmann (vocals and guitar), Peter Koch (percussion), Matthias Baumgardt (guitar), James Michael Griffin (keyboard), Amy & Elaine Goff (vocals), Mark Oesterreich (guitar, bass and vocals), Roman Müllenbach (saxophone) and Bruce Kent (drums).

Their best known hit is probably their debut single "Your Heart Keeps Burning" which was a hit in Western Germany in 1985 and reached number 17 in the singles charts. In 1986 they recorded an extended version of "Hit the Road Jack". The group disbanded soon thereafter.

== Career ==
The nine-strong initial formation of Blind Date consisted of Uwe Schlürmann, Peter Koch, Matthias Baumgardt, James Michael Griffin, Amy & Elaine Goff, Mark Oesterreich, Roman Müllenbach, and Bruce Kent. From 1986 the band was reduced to four members: Amy & Elaine Goff, Schlürmann, and Koch. These were temporarily supported by the studio musicians Christian Felke (saxophone) and Lothar Krell (keyboards), both live musicians in the band Supermax from 1978 .

The band got its name from the fact that its members met by accident. The debut single "Your Heart Keeps Burning" was a hit in Germany in 1985 and reached number 17 in the single charts. In 1986 the LP Dreamworld was released . Most of the titles were composed by Koch and Baumgartner. Griffin wrote the music for three of the tracks and Amy & Elaine Goff wrote the lyrics. Both follow-up singles How Did You Get To Me and Hit the Road Jack flopped and the band broke up. Another remix of Hit the Road Jack was released in 1992, but with only moderate success.

Amy and Elaine Goff became backing vocalists for Meat Loaf, Christian Felke became a studio saxophonist, and has been a member of rock-jazz band Scales since 1998. Uwe Schlürmann has been the lead singer of the country band Tumbleweed since 1996.

The German dance project Lazard covered Your Heart Keeps Burning in spring 2007 and was able to place it at the top of the German dance charts.
