= Nako Misaki =

Japanese voice actress and singer

- 岬 なこ
- Born: 8 March
- Occupations: Singer; voice actress
- Years active: 2021–present
- Agent: Holy Peak
- Notable work: Love Live! Superstar!! as Chisato Arashi
- Musical career
- Genres: J-Pop; Anison
- Instrument: Vocals
- Years active: 2023–present
- Label: Lantis
- Member of: Liella!
- Website: lantis.jp/misakinako/

Nako Misaki (Japanese: 岬 なこ, Hepburn: Misaki Nako; born 8 March) is a Japanese voice actress and singer from Hyōgo Prefecture, affiliated with Holy Peak. She is known for voicing Chisato Arashi in Love Live! Superstar!!. She is also a member of the series' idol group Liella!.

In 2023, she made her solo music debut with Lantis.

== Biography ==
Nako Misaki, a native of Hyōgo Prefecture, was born on 8 March. When she was in junior high school, she learned about the Love Live! School Idol Project anime after playing Love Live! School Idol Festival, and she later aspired to become a voice actor. She also later recalled admiring Umi Sonoda's voice actress Suzuko Mimori. After graduating from high school, she began attending Osaka Amusement Media College Department of Voice Acting department.

In December 2020, Misaki was announced as a cast member in Love Live! Superstar!! (a multimedia project in the Love Live! franchise); as part of the project, she voices the character Chisato Arashi as a member of the idol group Liella. In December 2022, she released Nako no Tonari, her debut photo book from Shufunotomo; she had to spend a few days in Hokkaido for production. In July 2023, she debuted as a solo artist with her album Day to You, which peaked at #7 at the Oricon Albums Chart. In August 2023, she was announced as the singer of "Sweet Sign", the ending theme of The 100 Girlfriends Who Really, Really, Really, Really, Really Love You. In June 2025, Misaki was announced as the voice of the character Lami in the second season of I Was Reincarnated as the 7th Prince so I Can Take My Time Perfecting My Magical Ability, and the performer of its ending theme "Meteor".

On 20 June 2021, Misaki tested positive for COVID-19, and her All Night Nippon Gold appearance was subsequently delayed. On 2 July, it was announced that she had made a recovery from the disease.

She has an older sister and a younger brother.

== Filmography ==
=== Anime television ===
2021

- Love Live! Superstar!!, Chisato Arashi

2022

- Love Live! Superstar!! 2nd Season, Chisato Arashi

2024

- Love Live! Superstar!! 3rd Season, Chisato Arashi

2025

- I Was Reincarnated as the 7th Prince so I Can Take My Time Perfecting My Magical Ability, Lami

2026

- The 100 Girlfriends Who Really, Really, Really, Really, Really Love You Season 3, Toruru Kijineta

=== Video games ===
2022

- Nobunaga no Yabō: Hadō, Yoshino Midoriya

== Discography ==
=== Albums ===
Title	Album details	Peak chart positions		Sales
Title	Album details	JPN	JPN Hot	Sales
Day to You	Released: 5 July 2023; Label: Lantis	7	—	—
Repeated Reflect	Released: 14 January 2026; Label: Lantis	11	—	JPN: 4,198
"—" denotes releases that did not chart.

=== Singles ===
Title	Year	Single details	Peak chart positions
Title	Year	Single details	JPN
"Sweet Sign"	2023	Released: 1 November 2023; Label: Lantis	9
