= Masashi Date =

Japanese baseball player

- Pitcher
- Born: August 23, 1975 (age 50); Kawasaki, Kanagawa, Japan
- Batted: Right Threw: Right

NPB debut
- May 25, 2001, for the Hanshin Tigers

Last NPB appearance
- October 6, 2005, for the Yomiuri Giants

NPB statistics (through 2006)
- Win–loss record: 12-7
- Saves: 9
- ERA: 3.33
- Strikeouts: 117

Teams
- As player: Hanshin Tigers (2001–2002); Nippon-Ham Fighters/Hokkaido Nippon-Ham Fighters (2003–2005); Yomiuri Giants (2005–2006)
- Last updated on: 19 February 2014

Masashi Date (伊達 昌司, Date Masashi; born 23 August 1975) is a former baseball player for Japan. He initially played for the Hanshin Tigers in the Central League.
