= Mystery Date (disambiguation) =

Mystery Date is a 1991 American teen comedy film.

Mystery Date may also refer to:

- Mystery Date (game), a board game from the Milton Bradley Company
- "Mystery Date" (Mad Men), an episode of the American AMC series Mad Men
- "Mistery Date", an episode of the American sitcom Modern Family
- "Misery Date", an episode of Aaahh!!! Real Monsters
