= Dating (disambiguation) =

Dating is an activity by two humans who are exploring or are in a romantic relationship.

The term may also refer to:

- Courtship, period in a couple's relationship which precedes engagement and marriage
- Timestamp, information identifying the date and time when a certain event occurred
- Chronological dating, estimating the age of an object or linguistic artifact
  - Relative dating, determining the relative order of past events
  - Absolute dating, determining an approximate age in archaeology or geology
    - Radiometric dating, a family of techniques used to date objects using radioactive impurities
  - Dendrochronology, dating tree rings to the year they were formed
- "Dating" (Not Going Out), a 2007 television episode

== See also ==
- Blind date (disambiguation)
