= Yuina =

Japanese actress and singer (born 2001)

- 結那
- Born: 27 September 2001 (age 25); Yokohama, Kanagawa Prefecture, Japan
- Occupations: actress; voice actress; singer; model
- Years active: 2014–present
- Agent: Houeishinsha
- Notable work: Love Live! Superstar!! as Wien Margarete
- Musical career
- Genres: J-Pop; Anison
- Instrument: Vocals
- Years active: 2016–present
- Label: StarRise
- Member of: Liella! / LustQueen
- Formerly of: Drop Doll (2016–2019)
- Website: lustqueen.info

Yuina (Japanese: 結那, Hepburn: born 27 September 2001) is a Japanese voice actress, actress, singer and model affiliated with Houeishinsha. She was part of the all-female band Drop Doll and currently voices Wien Margarete in Love Live! Superstar!!. She is also a member of the series' idol group Liella!.

== Biography ==
Yuina, a native of Yokohama, was born on 27 September 2001. She appeared as a child actor in the films Oh! My! God! Kamisama kara no okurimono (2014), Little Performer: Kaze no kodō (2016), and Nagareyama sanjūshi (2017).

Yuina was the guitarist of the all-female band Drop Doll. She appeared as Mao Sasaki in the 2019 film JK Rock, where Drop Doll performed the theme song. She portrayed Nanako Sawada in the March 2021 production of Gekidol the Stage at the Theater Sun-mall in Tokyo. She performed at Vandaful World, an October 2021 stage performance by Subaru Kimura's theatrical troupe Genius Gekidan Bakabacca. She was a finalist at Miss World Japan 2021.

Yuina starred in the second season of Love Live! Superstar!! (a multimedia project in the Love Live! franchise) as Wien Margarete, a rival character to the show's idol group Liella! in the second season. In November 2022, her character's single "Butterfly Wing/Edelstein" was released, peaking at #18 at the Oricon Singles Chart. In March 2023, Yuina appeared as a gravure model in Weekly Young Jump alongside the nine Liella! members. In April 2023, she was promoted to Liella! as one of the two new members. On 1 April 2024, it was officially announced that she would debut her solo music project "LustQueen".

== Filmography ==
- Oh! My! God! Kamisama kara no okurimono (2014), Gongen-sama
- Little Performer: Kaze no kodō (2016), Yoshiko
- Nagareyama sanjūshi (2017), Chisa Akimoto
- JK Rock (2019), Mao Sasaki
- Gekidol the Stage (2021), Nanako Sawada
- Vandaful World (2021)
- Love Live! Superstar!! 2nd Season (2022), Wien Margarete
- Love Live! Superstar!! 3rd Season (2024), Wien Margarete

== Discography ==
Title	Year	Album details	Peak chart positions		Sales
Title	Year	Album details	JPN	JPN Hot	Sales
"Butterfly Wing/Edelstein"	2022	Released: 30 November 2022; Label: Lantis; Formats: CD	18	—	—
"—" denotes releases that did not chart or were not released in that region.
