= Aya Emori =

Japanese voice actress

- 絵森 彩
- Born: Ayaka Yoda; February 23, 2004 (age 22); Yamanashi Prefecture, Japan
- Occupations: Voice actress; Singer
- Years active: 2019–present
- Agent: Box Corporation Inc.
- Notable work: Love Live! Superstar!! 2nd Season as Natsumi Onitsuka
- Height: 163 cm (5 ft 4 in)
- Musical career
- Genres: J-Pop; Anison
- Instrument: Vocals
- Years active: 2019–present
- Label: StarRise
- Member of: Liella!
- Formerly of: Hakoiri-Musume (2019–2020)
- Website: emori-aya.net

Aya Emori (絵森 彩, Emori Aya; born February 23, 2004) is a Japanese voice actress from Yamanashi Prefecture who is affiliated with Box Corporation. She began her voice acting activities in 2022 to voice Natsumi Onitsuka, one of the main protagonists of the anime series Love Live! Superstar!!. She is also a member of the series' idol group Liella!.

== Biography ==
Emori was born in Yamanashi Prefecture on February 23, 2004.

She began her activities as an idol in 2019, and became a member of "Hakoiri-Musume". At that time, she lived in Yamanashi Prefecture, where she was from, and went to Tokyo when she was engaged in entertainment activities. In addition, she used her real name "Ayaka Yoda" during her entertainment activities. The group ended their activities with a live performance held in August 2020. After that, on September 1, 2021, she changed the name of the activity to the current "Aya Emori".

In 2022, she was cast in her first major anime role as Natsumi Onitsuka in Love Live! Superstar!! 2nd Season.

The first photo book in her own name, ayaful! was released on February 23, 2024, when she celebrated her 20th birthday. On April 1 of that same year, she officially announced that she would be a solo artist under her English name.

== Filmography ==
=== Anime ===
2022

- Love Live! Superstar!! 2nd Season, Natsumi Onitsuka

2024

- Love Live! Superstar!! 3rd Season, Natsumi Onitsuka
