= Sayuri Date =

Japanese voice actress

- 伊達 さゆり
- Born: September 30, 2002 (age 24); Sendai, Miyagi Prefecture, Japan
- Occupation: Voice actress
- Years active: 2021–present
- Agent: Apollo Bay
- Notable work: Love Live! Superstar!! as Kanon Shibuya
- Height: 150 cm (4 ft 11 in)
- Relatives: Mikio Date (uncle)

Sayuri Date (伊達 さゆり, Date Sayuri; DAH-tay; born September 30, 2002) is a Japanese voice actress and singer who is affiliated with Apollo Bay. She began her voice acting activities in 2021 after winning an open audition to voice Kanon Shibuya, the protagonist of the anime series Love Live! Superstar!!. She is also a member of the series' idol group Liella!.

== Biography ==
Date was born in Sendai, Miyagi Prefecture on September 30, 2002. She had aspired to become a voice actress from an early age. While in elementary school she became a fan of the multimedia franchise Love Live! and dreamed of becoming part of the franchise. She considered attending a vocational school after graduating from high school, but during her third year she learned that the series was holding an open audition for roles in a new upcoming project. She decided to participate as she felt that she may not have another opportunity to participate in such an audition. She participated in the audition and was selected to be among the project's cast members. She was cast as Kanon Shibuya, the protagonist of the new project, now titled Love Live! Superstar!!. She made her voice acting debut when the project's anime series began in 2021. In October of the same year she started hosting a radio show on the online radio station A&G.

In 2022 she released a photobook titled Ashiato (あしあと) to celebrate her 20th birthday.

Her uncle is Mikio Date, comedian and member of double act Sandwichman. She calls the latter "Mi-kun."

== Filmography ==
=== Anime ===
2021

- Love Live! Superstar!!, Kanon Shibuya

2022

- Love Live! Superstar!! 2nd Season, Kanon Shibuya

2024

- Love Live! Superstar!! 3rd Season, Kanon Shibuya

=== Video games ===
2022

- Brown Dust 2, Kaede
- Eiketsu Taisen, Ikeda Sen

2023

- Assault Lily: Last Bullet, Fujino Ishizuka

=== Drama ===
2023

- Gekokujo Kyuji, Miyazawa
