= Love Live! Superstar!! =

Japanese multimedia project

- Promotional image for the third season featuring the members of Liella!, clockwise from top right: Kinako, Kanon, Mei, Shiki, Natsumi, Tomari, Sumire, Keke, Chisato, Ren, Margarete.
- ラブライブ！スーパースター!!
- Genre: Musical
- Created by: Hajime Yatate (story); Sakurako Kimino (concept)
- Developed by: Jukki Hanada
- Directed by: Takahiko Kyogoku
- Music by: Yoshiaki Fujisawa
- Country of origin: Japan
- Original language: Japanese
- No. of seasons: 3
- No. of episodes: 36 (list of episodes)

Production
- Animator: Sunrise
- Production companies: Bandai Namco Filmworks (Note: Credited as Sunrise during season 1.); Bandai Namco Music Live (Note: Credited as Bandai Namco Arts during season 1.); Kadokawa; Bushiroad (S2-3)

Original release
- Network: NHK Educational TV
- Release: July 11, 2021 – December 22, 2024

Related
- Manga

Love Live! Superstar!! 2-ri no jikan! 〜 Special times 〜
- Written by: 2C Galore
- Published by: ASCII Media Works
- Original run: September 30, 2021 – November 19, 2021
- Volumes: 2
- Manga

Love Live! Superstar!! Chokotto Liella!
- Written by: moffmachi
- Published by: ASCII Media Works
- Original run: August 26, 2022 – present
- Volumes: 1
- Manga

Love Live! Superstar!! Chii-chan Buchō wa Yūnō Desu!
- Written by: Yūta Taneda
- Published by: ASCII Media Works
- Imprint: Dengeki Comics Next
- Magazine: ComicWalker, Niconico Seiga
- Original run: January 26, 2024 – December 3, 2024
- Volumes: 2

Love Live! Superstar!! (ラブライブ！スーパースター！！, Rabu Raibu! Sūpāsutā!!) is a Japanese multimedia project co-developed by Kadokawa Corporation, music label Lantis, and animation studio Sunrise, a division of Bandai Namco Filmworks. The project is the third major and fourth overall installment in the Love Live! franchise after Love Live! School Idol Project, and Love Live! Sunshine!!. Superstar initially revolves around five schoolgirls forming an idol group named Liella! as an extracurricular club activity. With each passing school year, the group makes a name for themselves and go on to recruit several other members.

An anime television series by Sunrise aired on NHK Educational TV from July to October 2021. A second season aired from July to October 2022, while a third season aired from October to December 2024.

== Plot ==
The story is set in the Yuigaoka Private Girls High School (私立結ヶ丘女子高等学校, Shiritsu Yuigaoka Joshi Kōtō Gakkō) that lies between the Omotesando, Harajuku, and Aoyama neighborhoods of Tokyo. Originally set to be demolished, the school has instead recently reopened to accept new students. Within a school that has not made a name for itself, along with no history or accomplishments to speak of, Kanon Shibuya and four other first-year students discover the existence of "school idols", and for one reason or another eventually join the school idol club (with the group later being named "Liella!") in order to leave their mark on the newly reopened academy. As time progresses, Liella! gains popularity with the general public and prospective students, which leads to new members joining with each consecutive school year. The number of club members gradually rises from the founding 5 in its first year, 9 in its second year, and 11 in its third year.

== Characters ==
The original five members are first-year students in the first season, second-year students in the second season and advance to third-year students in the third season.

=== Liella! ===
Top: official logo in Japanese
Bottom: official logo in English

Group logo

Kanon Shibuya (澁谷 かのん, Shibuya Kanon)
Voiced by: Sayuri Date (Japanese); Kristi Rothrock (English)
Kanon is a third-year student who claims to be "someone without standout characteristics". She is a kind and selfless girl who aims to support and befriend everyone, even those who were initially unfriendly towards her. Her family consists of her busy father who works as a translator, her mom who runs a cafe, and a younger sister. The sisters often help their mother with various chores around the café, with one of her specialties being creating latte art. Kanon owns a pet Eurasian scops owl who also serves the café's popular mascot.
Tang Keke (唐 可可, Tan Kūkū)
Voiced by: Liyuu (Japanese); Julia Gu (English)
Keke is a third-year student who hails from Shanghai, China, having just recently moved to Japan — her mother's homeland — to become a school idol, and is initially responsible for recruiting new members for the club. She holds the JLPT N1 certificate. Keke has a habit of speaking in Mandarin when she gets excited. Cheerful and optimistic, she encourages Kanon to overcome her self doubting personality quirks.
Chisato Arashi (嵐 千砂都, Arashi Chisato)
Voiced by: Nako Misaki (Japanese); Maddie Matsumoto (English)
Chisato is a third-year student and Kanon's childhood friend who is training to become a professional breakdancer. She is an energetic and friendly extrovert who is also fascinated by round shaped objects and things, especially Kanon's pet, Manmaru. Chisato is also known to keep up to date on gossip and rumors that are spread around the school.
Sumire Heanna (平安名 すみれ, Heanna Sumire)
Voiced by: Naomi Payton (Japanese); Lizzie Freeman (English)
Sumire is a third-year student who lives at a well-known and respected community shrine located near the school. She acts somewhat arrogant and rude to strangers, making her anti-social to her classmates. However, around her friends, Sumire becomes much nicer, yet she's still confident and prone to being cocky.
Ren Hazuki (葉月 恋, Hazuki Ren)
Voiced by: Nagisa Aoyama (Japanese); Natalie Van Sistine (English)
Ren is a third-year student who is the daughter of the school founder, Hana Hazuki, as well as the school's first student council president. She is respected around campus for being polite and obedient.
Kinako Sakurakoji (桜小路 きな子, Sakurakōji Kinako)
Voiced by: Nozomi Suzuhara
Kinako is a respectful and generous second-year student from Hokkaido who lives on her own and is not used to the big city. She was recruited by Kanon to become a school idol after getting lost on campus. Despite being soft-spoken, Kinako is a hard worker who does not back down easily from challenges. She has a tendency to be very loud and can be easily startled. Kinako has a habit of referring to herself in the third person and ends her sentence with "~ssu" due to her rural upbringing.
Mei Yoneme (米女 メイ, Yoneme Mei)
Voiced by: Akane Yabushima
Mei is a second-year student who is often mistaken as a delinquent due to her "scary eyes", which turns out to be a side effect of her poor eyesight. She speaks to strangers in a rather abrasive tone and comes off as frightening to other students, but is actually timid and has a hidden long-standing admiration for idols.
Shiki Wakana (若菜 四季, Wakana Shiki)
Voiced by: Wakana Ōkuma
Shiki is a stoic second-year student who has difficulty expressing herself. Being one of the school's only science club members, she usually can be found spending her free time in the science club room inventing strange gadgets, one of which being a pair of robotic roller-skates.
Natsumi Onitsuka (鬼塚 夏美, Onitsuka Natsumi)
Voiced by: Aya Emori
Natsumi is a second year student who is also an aspiring "L-Tuber" and decided to become a school idol to boost her online following and make a profit. She has a friendly demeanor, but can also be rather manipulative and selfish. Natsumi frequently ends her sentences with "desu no".
Wien Margarete (ウィーン・マルガレーテ, Win Marugarete)
Voiced by: Yuina^{S2 E3 credit}
Margarete is a cocky first-year exchange student from Austria who comes from a music-inclined family. She is competitive and outright hostile to other idols she sees as threats. Margrete picks up a part-time job working at the Shibuya family cafe and reluctantly lives with Kanon's family during her stay.
Tomari Onitsuka (鬼塚 冬毬, Onitsuka Tomari)
Voiced by: Sakura Sakakura
Tomari is a first-year student with a natural dancing skill who is also Natsumi's younger sister. Like her older sister, Tomari views school idol activities as a potential income stream that will generate profit for her family. However, unlike Natsumi, Tomari comes off as stiff and calculating to other idols.

=== Sunny Passion ===
Yūna Hijirisawa (聖澤 悠奈, Hijirisawa Yūna) & Mao Hiiragi (柊 摩央, Hiiragi Mao)
Voiced by: Chihaya Yoshitake & Yuna Yūki (Japanese)^{S1 E3 credit} Dani Chambers & Corey Pettit (English)
Yūna and Mao are the members of Sunny Passion, a duo school idol unit originated from Kōzu-shima who inspired Keke to move to Japan and become a school idol. Yūna is the most cheerful one of the duo, while Mao is reserved.

=== Others ===
Aria Shibuya (澁谷 ありあ, Shibuya Aria)
Voiced by: Akane Matsunaga (Japanese); Cat Protano (English)^{S2 E1 credit}
Aria is Kanon's younger sister who was initially cynical about her choice to become a school idol, but later became supportive. Like Kanon, she also helps out with her mother running the café.
Manmaru (マンマル)
Voiced by: Anna Mugiho (Japanese); Khoi Dao (English)
Manmaru is Kanon's pet owl who serves as the cafe's mascot. He is known by its customers for being inexplicably symmetrically round, much to Chisato's fascination.

== Development ==
The franchise announced a brand new anime project following the release of Love Live! Nijigasaki High School Idol Club in January 2020, with the premise featuring a new set of characters who are all first-year students in a newly-reopened school originally on the verge of demolition. The school lies between the Omotesando, Harajuku, and Aoyama neighborhoods of Tokyo. An audition for one of the main cast also occurred on March 12, 2020, but was postponed due to COVID-19. Atsushi Saitō serves as the character design adapting style of the series' original character designer Yūhei Murota. The school name was decided through fans' votes and ended in May 2020 with Yuigaoka Girls High School (結ヶ丘女子高等学校, Yuigaoka Joshi Kōtō Gakkō). The main characters names were also announced: Kanon Shibuya, Tang Keke, Chisato Arashi, Sumire Heanna, and Ren Hazuki.

The project's name, Love Live! Superstar!! was announced in July through the series' exclusive magazine Love Live! Days. In September, the school idol group's name, "Liella!" was also chosen through fans' votes. The name was chosen among 16 options that fans could vote for. The name "Liella!" comes from a combination from a French word "lier" which means "to connect", which is the same as Yui (結) in the school's name in Japanese, and "brilliante", which means an "inner glow". Behind the group's name lies the feelings of the hope that the small stars of today who have their own brilliance will become superstars someday.

The cast of the initial five main characters was later revealed in December 2020: Sayuri Date, Liyuu, Nako Misaki, Naomi Payton, and Nagisa Aoyama. Date and Aoyama are members who passed the open audition that was held earlier in the year. (Note: The open audition originally only chose one person; it was changed and two people were chosen as the result.) The group's debut single, "Hajimari wa Kimi no Sora" (始まりは君の空) released on April 7, 2021. The single includes an animation PV and released in two versions—each with different B-side tracks: "Minna de Kanaeru Monogatari" (みんなで叶える物語) and "Watashi o Kanaeru Monogatari" (私を叶える物語).

On April 28, 2022, four new characters were announced to be joining Liella!'s member lineup for the second season in an issue of the Love Live! Days magazine: Kinako Sakurakoji, Mei Yoneme, Shiki Wakana and Natsumi Onitsuka, and the second season's air date was given the timeframe of summer 2022. Shortly after the confirmation of a third season in October 2022, a second nationwide open audition recruiting one cast member for Liella!'s 'third generation' was announced. On June 11, 2023, a new character named Tomari Onitsuka was introduced in an issue of Love Live! Days magazine. Additionally, supporting character Wien Margarete, an antagonist who first appeared in the second season, was confirmed to be joining Liella!

== Broadcast and distribution ==
The anime is animated by Bandai Namco Filmworks and directed by Takahiko Kyogoku, with Jukki Hanada handling series composition and Atsushi Saito designing the characters. Yoshiaki Fujisawa returns from his work on Love Live! School Idol Project to compose the music. It aired on NHK Educational TV from July 11 to October 17, 2021. Funimation streamed the series for international releases. From Episode 2 onwards, Liella! perform both the opening and ending themes, titled "Start!! True Dreams" and "Mirai wa Kaze no Yō ni" (未来は風のように) respectively. Special animated music videos made specifically for the NHK Educational TV broadcast featuring original songs by them air after each episode titled "Songs of Liella!".

On October 24, 2021, it was announced during a live screening event of the first season that a second season was in production. The announcement was uploaded to the official Love Live! Series YouTube channel shortly after the event. The second season aired from July 17 to October 9, 2022.

A third season was announced following the conclusion of the second season alongside open auditions for a new main cast member. Sakura Sakakura won the audition and was cast as Tomari Onitsuka. The third season airied from October 6 to December 22, 2024. The opening and ending themes is performed by Liella! respectively titled "Let's be One" and "Daisuki Full Power".

== Other media ==
Various Liella! songs were playable through Love Live! School Idol Festival and its spin-off game School Idol Festival All Stars for limited amounts of time. SR cards of Liella! members were also made available through a special login bonus in School Idol Festival as commemoration of the anime series' broadcast.

A spin-off manga titled Love Live! Superstar!! Chii-chan Buchō wa Yūnō Desu!, written and illustrated by Yūta Taneda, began serialization on Kadokawa Corporation's Comic Walker manga website on March 30, 2023. The manga focuses around the character Chisato Arashi. The manga's chapters have been compiled into a single tankōbon volume as of January 26, 2024.

== Café Casa incident ==
Due to the main character of Love Live! Superstar!!'s family café being modeled after Café Casa, a real family-owned café in Shibuya, the café's staff received infringements of their privacy via social media. The increased presence of Love Live! fans at the café also affected its intended mood and atmosphere. The Love Live! staff issued a public apology for this in June 2021, admitting that they had used the café's similarity without permission or "prior consideration". Café Casa explained that Sunrise had previously reached out to them to discuss the use of their likeness. Although the owners of Café Casa tentatively agreed and were told that Sunrise staff members would visit the café the following day, the staff did not show up, leading Café Casa to assume the negotiations were over. The design of the café in the anime was later changed so it resembled Café Casa less.
