= Liyuu =

Chinese voice actress, cosplayer and singer (born 1997)

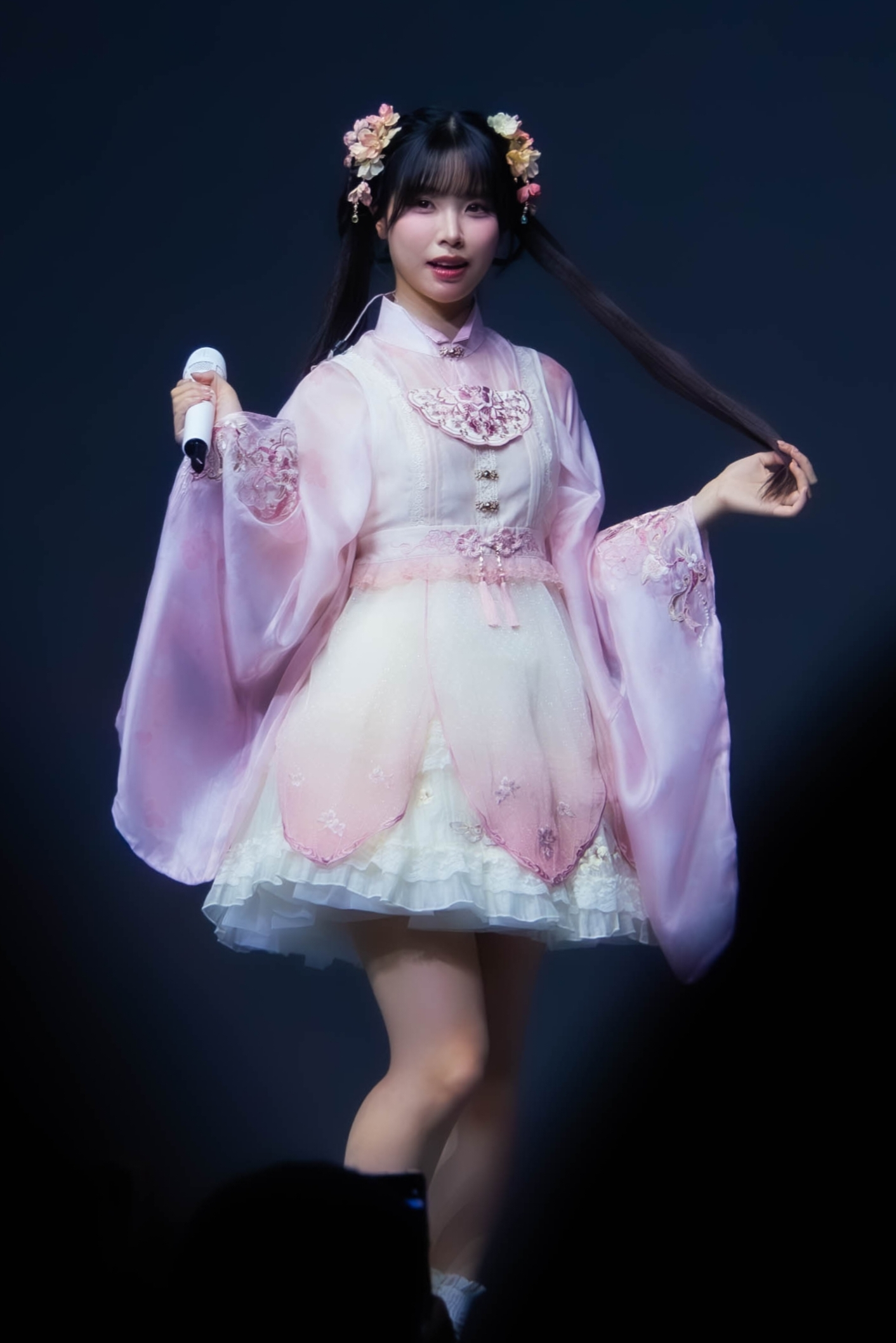
- Liyuu at a fan meeting in Shanghai in June 2025
- Born: Li Jia; 9 January 1997 (age 29); Shanghai, China
- Occupations: Singer; tarento; cosplayer; voice actress
- Agent: HoriPro International
- Musical career
- Genres: Anison; J-pop; C-pop
- Instrument: Vocals
- Years active: 2020–present
- Labels: Lantis, Modern Sky
- Website: liyuu0109.com

Birth name
- Simplified Chinese: 李嘉
Transcriptions
Standard Mandarin
- Hanyu Pinyin: Lǐ Jiā

Stage name
- Simplified Chinese: 黎狱
Transcriptions
Standard Mandarin
- Hanyu Pinyin: Lí yù

Li Jia (Chinese: 李嘉; Pinyin: Lǐ Jiā; born 9 January 1997), better known by her stage name Liyuu, is a Chinese singer, voice actress and cosplayer who is affiliated with HoriPro International and signed to Lantis and Modern Sky. Beginning her activities as a cosplayer before 2016 under the stage name 黎狱 (pinyin: Lí yù, pronounced same as "Liyuu"), she made her debut as a singer in 2020 with the release of her first single "Magic Words", the title track of which was used as the opening theme of the anime television series Hatena Illusion. Her music has also been featured in I'm Standing on a Million Lives. She is also known for her role as Tang Keke in the mixed-media project Love Live! Superstar!!. She is nicknamed Li-chan by her fellow Liella! members.

== Biography ==
Liyuu was born in Shanghai on 9 January 1997. From an early age she developed an interest in anime, particularly after watching anime series, such as Cardcaptor Sakura, Shugo Chara!, and Reborn!. During her junior high school years, she watched the series K-On! and gained an interest in the character Yui Hirasawa. While researching about anime, she discovered the practice of cosplay, which immediately interested her. Upon entering high school, she began engaging in cosplay activities, with Yui as her first character. At first, she experienced difficulties in preparing for cosplay as her school prohibited the use of make-up, leaving her with little experience in applying it to herself. She then began participating in various cosplay events in China, before attending her first overseas event, appearing at Winter Comiket in Tokyo in 2016. Her activities would gain her a following in Japan, eventually leading to her having over 1 million followers on social media.

Liyuu's interest in pursuing a career as a musician began in junior high school. Although she did not originally intended to become a singer, she developed an interest in anime music and would sing such songs in private. In high school, she published a number of songs on the Chinese video sharing website Bilibili. In 2018, she became affiliated with the Japanese talent agency HoriPro International. The following year, she sang "Polaris", which was used as an image song for the character Siren in the mobile game Dragalia Lost. In 2020, she made her major debut as a singer under Lantis with the release of her first single "Magic Words"; the title song is used as the opening theme for the anime television series Hatena Illusion. Her second single "Carpe Diem" (カルペ・ディエム, Karupe Diemu) was released on 25 November 2020; the title song is used as the closing theme for the anime television series I'm Standing on a Million Lives. In December 2020, it was announced that she will be playing the role of Keke Tang in the multimedia project Love Live! Superstar!!. She held her first solo concert in Yokohama on February 11, 2022. Later that year, she released the single "True Fool Love", the title song of which was used as the opening theme to the anime television series More Than a Married Couple, But Not Lovers.

In May 2023, Liyuu modeled for the brand Baby, The Stars Shine Bright's first fragrance.

== Personal life ==
Prior to the COVID-19 pandemic, Liyuu lived in Shanghai, visiting Japan at least once a month for cosplay and artist activities.

== Filmography ==
=== Anime television ===
2021

- Love Live! Superstar!!, Tang Keke

2022

- Love Live! Superstar!! 2nd Season, Tang Keke

2024

- Love Live! Superstar!! 3rd Season, Tang Keke

=== TV series ===
2024

- Sugar Dog Life, Shiorin

== Discography ==
=== Studio albums ===
| Title | Album details | Peak chart positions | |
| Title | Album details | JPN Oricon | JPN Billboard |
|---|---|---|---|
| Fo (u) r YuU | Release date: February 9, 2022; Label: Lantis | 15 | – |
| Soaring Heart | Release date: February 7, 2024; Label: Lantis | 17 | – |

=== Singles ===
| Title | Peak Oricon position |
|---|---|
| "Magic Words": Release date: January 22, 2020 | 44 |
| "Carpe Diem" (カルペ・ディエム, Karupe Diemu): Release date: November 25, 2020 | 60 |
| "True Fool Love": Release date: November 2, 2022 | 7 |
| "Bloomin'": Release date: September 30, 2023 | 14 |
