= Murder Mystery of the Dead =

Japanese party game

- Anime key visual

マーダーミステリー・オブ・ザ・デッド (Mādā Misuterī obu za Deddo)
- Created by: Cosaic; Group SNE
- Anime television series
- Directed by: Tomohiro Ishii
- Written by: Giggle Akiguchi; Teren Mikami
- Music by: Mayuko Kobuta
- Studio: Ziine Studio
- Original network: ABC TV, Tokyo MX
- Original run: November 14, 2024 – December 26, 2024
- Episodes: 6

Murder Mystery of the Dead (マーダーミステリー・オブ・ザ・デッド, Mādā Misuterī obu za Deddo) is a Japanese murder mystery party board game developed by Cosaic and Group SNE and released in April 2021. An anime television series based on the game aired from November to December 2024.

== Characters ==
Mikoto Amano (天野 ミコト, Amano Mikoto)
Voiced by: Moe Kahara
Ranna Kuze (久世 蘭奈, Kuze Ranna)
Voiced by: Lynn
Yū Kodama (児玉 夕, Kodama Yū)
Voiced by: Kiyono Yasuno
Fumika Shinohara (篠原 史香, Shinohara Fumika)
Voiced by: Maki Kawase
Riri Aramaki (荒牧 莉莉, Aramaki Riri)
Voiced by: Tsubaki Makino
Murumuru (ムルムル)
Voiced by: Hikaru Tono
Rumina (るみな)
Voiced by: Madoka Asahina

== Anime ==
An anime television series adaptation produced by ABC Animation and Balus aired on ABC TV and Tokyo MX from November 14 to December 26, 2024. The series is animated by Ziine Studio and directed by Tomohiro Ishii, and its scripts are handled by Giggle Akiguchi and Teren Mikami, while the music is composed by Mayuko Kubota. The opening theme song is "Kyozō" (False Image) performed by VTuber idol project Mixstgirls, while the ending theme song is "MAKE YOU CHANCE" performed by Virtual Athlete Gaming.
