= Love Live! Hasunosora Girls' High School Idol Club =

Japanese multimedia project

- Promotional visual featuring the nine main characters as of the 104th school year. From left to right: Sayaka, Tsuzuri, Kosuzu, Kozue, Kaho, Ginko, Hime, Rurino, Megumi

Link! Like! ラブライブ! (Rinku! Raiku! Rabu Raibu!)
- Created by: Hajime Yatate (story); Sakurako Kimino (concept)
- Developer: ODD No.
- Publisher: ODD No.
- Writer: Teren Mikami (main story)
- Series: Love Live!
- Platforms: Android, iOS
- Release: JP: April 15, 2023 – June 30, 2026
- Genre: Digital collectible card game
- Mode: Single-player
- Manga

Link! Life! Love Live!
- Illustrated by: Maya Mizuki
- Published by: ASCII Media Works
- Original run: February 18, 2023 – present
- Volumes: 1
- Manga

Love Live! Flowers: Hasunosora Girls' School Idol Club
- Illustrated by: Tsumumi
- Published by: Shueisha
- Imprint: Young Jump Comics
- Magazine: Ultra Jump
- Original run: November 17, 2023 – present
- Volumes: 2
- Manga

Link! Like! Love Live! @comic
- Illustrated by: Yūki Takami
- Published by: ASCII Media Works
- Magazine: LoveLive!Days
- Original run: December 27, 2024 – present
- Anime film

Love Live! Hasunosora Girls' High School Idol Club Bloom: Garden Party
- Directed by: Gō Kurosaki
- Written by: Fumiaki Maruto
- Music by: Yoshiaki Fujisawa
- Studio: Sublimation (animation); Sunrise (planning and production)
- Released: May 8, 2026
- Runtime: 75 minutes
- Anime television series
- Directed by: Gō Kurosaki
- Written by: Fumiaki Maruto
- Music by: Yoshiaki Fujisawa
- Studio: Sublimation (animation); Sunrise (planning and production)
- Original network: Tokyo MX, BS11, Sun TV, KBS Kyoto, TV Aichi, RKB, SBS, HBC, MRO
- Original run: January 10, 2027 – scheduled
- Episodes: 7

Hasunosora Girls' High School Idol Club (Note: 蓮ノ空女学院スクールアイドルクラブ, Hasunosora Jogakuin Sukūru Aidoru Kurabu) is a multimedia project in the Love Live! franchise. It consists of media like anime, manga, and previously the mobile game Link! Like! Love Live!. (Note: Japanese: Link! Like! ラブライブ!, Hepburn: Rinku! Raiku! Rabu Raibu!)

Published by ODD No., Link! Like! Love Live! was launched on April 15, 2023. Besides gameplay, the app included live streaming and stories focusing on the members of the eponymous fictional club. It ended service on June 30, 2026.

An anime film, Love Live! Hasunosora Girls' High School Idol Club Bloom Garden Party, was screened in Japanese theaters on May 8, 2026, followed by an anime television series set to premiere in January 2027.

== Premise ==
Hasunosora is marketed as a departure from previous Love Live! series, following "virtual school idols" and being "together with school idols over 365 days." The project differs from VTubers in that it has multimedia akin to predecessors that are antithetical to VTubing—wherein those portraying the characters typically remain anonymous—such as real-life live shows and emphasis on the voice actresses. Project producer Kazuki Satō explained in 2025 that the "original idea" behind it was to "create a comprehensive and enjoyable multimedia mix experience within a single app. With this app alone, you can read the original story, enjoy live streaming, and enjoy live music in a slightly unique structure."

The in-universe story takes place at Hasunosora Girls' High School in Kanazawa, Ishikawa Prefecture. In lieu of an anime, the story throughout the project's early life was primarily told through Link! Like! Love Live! and progressed in real time. Members in their final year of high school graduate and depart Hasunosora at the end of the academic year as students would in real life, while new members are added when the next school year begins. Those who graduated occasionally return with cameo appearances in the story or special streams.

Live streams in which the characters talk with viewers, called "With×MEETS", were conducted on the app as well as "Fes×LIVE" in-character concerts. Fes×LIVE shows are held every three months; they were initially monthly performances before the window was extended due to budget and time constraints. Motion capture is used for the voice actresses to appear as their characters in 3D.

== Gameplay ==
Link! Like! Love Live! was a digital collectible card game. The primary game mode, School Idol Stage, required players to accumulate as much LOVE points as possible during performances and reach a certain threshold to clear the map; LOVE was attained using a set of 18 cards and their corresponding skills. The mode can be played manually or have skills activated automatically.

Songs and cards were categorized by attributes like appeal, style type, and mood, with the most effective cards in School Idol Stage being those that match the song. Cards are also divided by rarity, with rarer UR cards having higher stats, and are acquired via a gacha system. Their strength could be further boosted with enough points for each attribute.

School Idol Show, a rhythm game mode, was implemented in 2025.

== Characters ==
Where appropriate, plot descriptions mentioned below refer to the in-game story and anime. Other parts of the franchise, such as the manga, feature some variations in the storyline.

=== Hasunosora Girls' High School Idol Club ===
Logo of the Hasunosora Girls' High School Idol Club

Unlike other Love Live! series where they are formed mid-story, Hasunosora's School Idol Club was divided into three units since the start of the project. As of the 106th class term, the club consists of Cerise Bouquet, Dollchestra, Mira-Cra Park!, and Tasogare no Rinkou. The group Edel Note existed during the 105th year.

Students who have graduated are denoted with an asterisk.

==== Cerise Bouquet ====
Cerise Bouquet (Note: スリーズブーケ, Surīzu Būke) is the oldest unit in the club. The unit is described as a "cute and traditional" group similar to those in other projects.

Kaho Hinoshita (日野下 花帆, Hinoshita Kaho)*
Voiced by: Nozomi Nirei
Kaho is an upbeat and innocent girl who radiates energy. She has a close friendship with Kozue. Kaho became joint president of the School Idol Club during her senior year alongside Sayaka. She graduated with the 103rd class.

Kozue Otomune (乙宗 梢, Otomune Kozue)*
Voiced by: Niina Hanamiya
Kozue was the president of the School Idol Club during the 103rd and 104th class years. The daughter of a musical family, she was popular on campus for her elegant nature. She graduated with the 102nd class.

Ginko Momose (百生 吟子, Momose Ginko)
Voiced by: Hina Sakurai
Ginko is a third-year student. Her family does Japanese traditional dance and embroidery, while her grandmother was a member of Hasunosora's Performing Arts Club before it became the School Idol Club. She becomes the club president during the 106th school year. Sakurai recalled in 2024 that she studied the basics of Japanese dance to prepare for her role as Ginko.

Maika Kinjo (錦上マイカ, Kinjō Maika)
Voiced by: Julia Hoshimiya
A first-year student at Hasunosora. Maika is a serious yet awkward person who initially shows a lack of interest in school idols, but starts to enjoy them after seeing the School Idol Club at the Bloom Garden Party. She previously attended Kurumibashi Middle School.

==== Dollchestra ====
Their name styled in all caps, Dollchestra (a portmanteau of "doll" and "orchestra") focuses on more serious and emotional songs than its counterparts.

Sayaka Murano (村野 さやか, Murano Sayaka)*
Voiced by: Kokona Nonaka
A figure skater who felt her career had stagnated, she was invited by Kaho to join the School Idol Club with the hope of bettering herself. With Dollchestra, Sayaka was often tasked with taking care of Tsuzuri such as attending to her basic needs. She graduated with the 103rd class.

Tsuzuri Yūgiri (夕霧 綴理, Yūgiri Tsuzuri)*
Voiced by: Kotoko Sasaki
An aloof girl, Tsuzuri tends to wander off in favor of other interests. Sasaki described Tsuzuri as having a "cat-like side" and analogized her to a penguin, which is also Tsuzuri's character icon, since penguins have a tendency to follow other bipedal animals. She graduated with the 102nd class.

Kosuzu Kachimachi (徒町 小鈴, Kachimachi Kosuzu)
Voiced by: Fūka Hayama
Kosuzu is a third-year student and the youngest daughter of a fishing family in Tsuruga, Fukui. She idolized Sayaka prior to joining the School Idol Club. Kosuzu can be hesitant and nervous at first, but is eager to try new things.

Ceras Yanagida Lilienfeld (セラス・柳田・リリエンフェルト, Serasu・Yanagida・Ririenferuto)
Voiced by: Miu Miyake
A second-year student at Hasunosora, Ceras is Kaho's childhood friend who befriended her when they were in the hospital together. She was an aspiring violinist but was unable to pursue it due to her medical problems. A former member of Edel Note, Ceras hoped to use Mizukawa's School Idol Club to save it from closing. She is half-German, though she grew up in Japan.

==== Mira-Cra Park! ====
Mira-Cra Park! (Note: みらくらぱーく！, Mirakura Pāku!) specializes in lively and chaotic music. For example, the 104th class version of "Identity" is faster than the original rendition and incorporates ska punk themes like brass instruments.

The unit's name is a portmanteau of the words "Miracle", "Kurakura" (クラクラ), and "Park". It can also be shortened to "Mirapa!" (みらぱ!).

Rurino Ōsawa (大沢 瑠璃乃, Ōsawa Rurino)*
Voiced by: Kanna Kan
Rurino briefly studied abroad in California before returning to Japan. She is a cheerful and energetic girl, but becomes weary and lethargic should she have fun for too long. She and Megumi are childhood friends. Rurino graduated with the 103rd class.

Megumi Fujishima (藤島 慈, Fujishima Megumi)*
Voiced by: Kona Tsukine
Megumi is an online streamer who likes to express her cuteness but can be cunning as well. She graduated with the 102nd class. Following her graduation, she moved to California.

Hime Anyōji (安養寺 姫芽, Anyōji Hime)
Voiced by: Rin Kurusu
A third-year student, Hime was a fan of Mirapa! before joining the group upon entering high school. She is an esports player who likes first-person shooters.

Aoi Reisawa (令沢 葵, Reisawa Aoi)
Voiced by: Kana Asahi
A first-year student at Hasunosora. An upbeat and mischievous girl, Aoi was already a big fan of the School Idol Club before seeing them in person at the Bloom Garden Party. She is an alumna of Kurumibashi.

==== Tasogare no Rinkou ====
A solo unit.

Izumi Katsuragi (桂城泉, Katsuragi Izumi)
Voiced by: Amane Shindō
Izumi is a third-year student and former member of Edel Note, a unit from Mizukawa Girls' School that competed against Hasunosora to qualify for Love Live!'s national tournament during the 2024–25 school year. After Mizukawa shut down, Edel Note transferred to Hasunosora and disbanded the following year. Izumi is a mature girl and a talented performer, and serves as Ceras' confidant.

=== Other characters ===
Mion Shinowa (紫輪みおん, Shinowa Mion)
Voiced by: Kanae Yuasa
A first-year student at Hasunosora.

Sachi Ōgami (大賀美沙知, Ōgami Sachi)
Voiced by: Konomi Kohara
Sachi was Hasunosora's student council president during the 102nd and 103rd years. She also worked as the School Idol Club's president and was a member of all three units before stepping down due to conflicts with her student council work. She was part of the school's 101st graduating class.

Tsukasa Murano (村野つかさ, Murano Tsukasa)
Voiced by: Moe Toyota
Sayaka's older sister and a figure skater.

== History ==
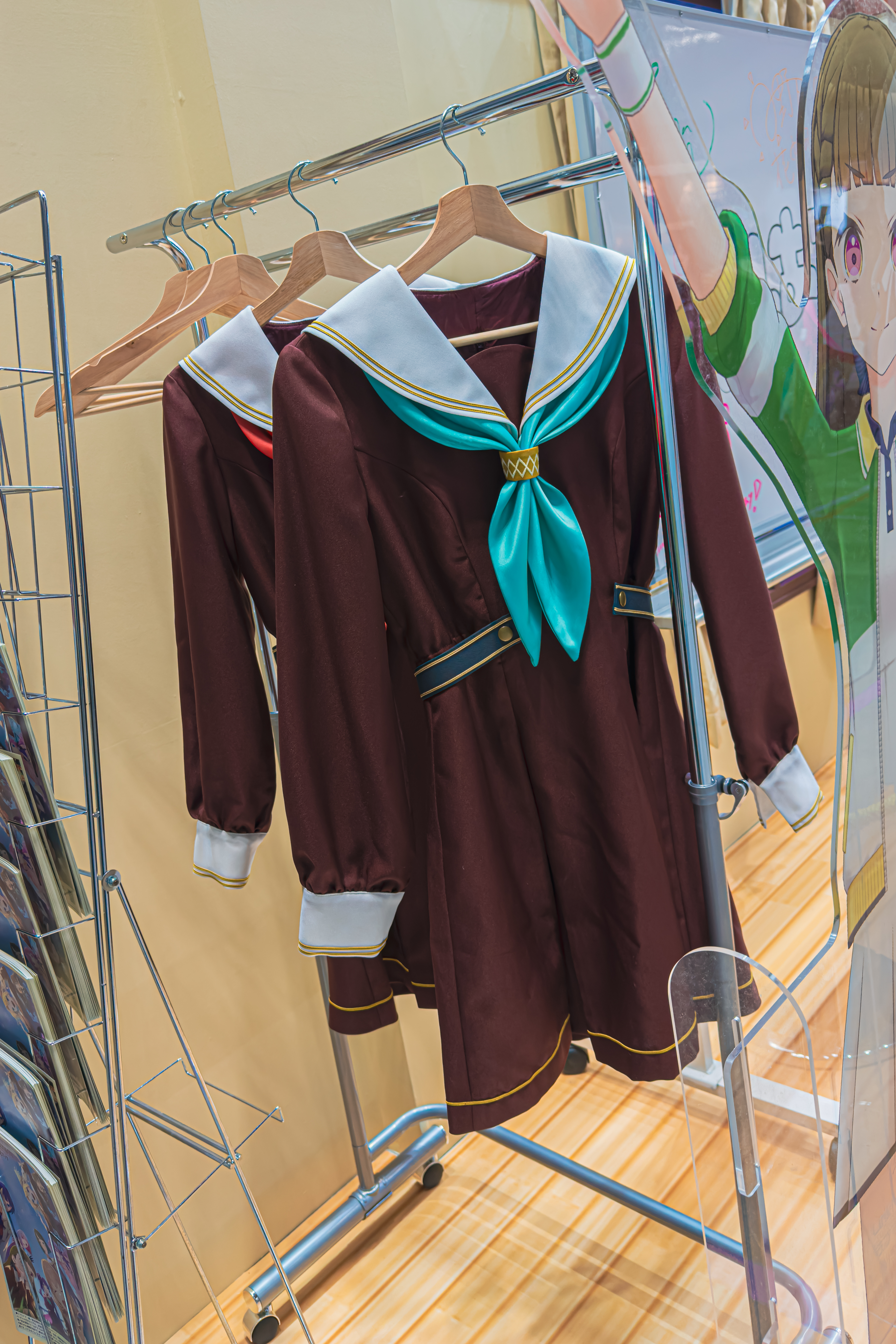
Hasunosora uniforms displayed at Comiket 105

On February 27, 2022, the Love Live! franchise announced a new project focusing on "virtual school idols." Possible names for the series were submitted by fans from October to November before the final name of Link! Like! Love Live! was unveiled in January 2023.

ODD No. became the game's publisher in December as part of a partnership with Bandai Namco Filmworks and Bandai Namco Music. According to Satō, the app was originally planned to be a rhythm game similar to its predecessor Love Live! School Idol Festival before switching to a card game. He noted this pivot prompted criticism upon release from those who thought it was a generic idol raising game; the Love Live! Days magazine jokingly described it as a "school idol cheering app."

The initial six-member cast, all of whom were Love Live! fans prior to joining the franchise, was assembled in February 2022 before being revealed on February 10, 2023. Haruko Iizuka, who worked on series like Little Busters! and Hori-san to Miyamura-kun, designed the characters. Their first live stream took place on April 2 while the game released in early access two weeks later on April 13. The app's full launch came on May 20.

"Dream Believers", the first song recorded by the six, was released as their debut single on March 29, 2023. It peaked at fifth on the Oricon Singles Chart. Their first live was held at Pacifico Yokohama on June 4.

The game surpassed 500 thousand downloads in February 2024. The 104th graduating class—Ginko, Kosuzu, and Hime—was added in April with the start of the new school year. Satō called their arrivals "big risks both inside and outside the app" since there were no advance warning or hints, but it was realistic for actual school clubs. Likewise, the 102nd class' voice actresses—Hanamiya, Sasaki, and Tsukine—departed the franchise full time following their characters' graduations and a final live tour between April and June 2025. The graduating members occasionally returned to reprise their roles for cameos in the game's story and the movie, while Tsukine hosted an in-character stream in December 2025 where Megumi discusses her life after school.

On April 6, 2026, the game's shutdown was announced for June 30 due to rising costs and increased burden on developers because of the real time format.

== Media ==
Singles and albums have been produced for each of the four units as well as the School Idol Club as a whole. Cerise Bouquet ("Reflection in the mirror") and Dollchestra's ("Sparkly Spot") debut singles were jointly released on April 26, 2023, while Mira-Cra Park's first ("Identity") came on November 29; following their addition to the club, Edel Note's first single "Retrofuture" was released on May 21, 2025. The project's music is published by Lantis.

Love Live! Flowers: Hasunosora Girls' School Idol Club, (Note: ラブライブ! flowers＊ー蓮ノ空女学院スクールアイドルクラブー, Rabu Raibu! Furawāzu*-Hasunosora Jogakuin Sukūru Aidoru Kurabu-) a manga series by Tsumumi, began serialization in Ultra Jump on November 17, 2023. Ten Tanaka, who is involved with writing the story for the game, also wrote the plot for the manga. Yonkoma comics in the game were compiled into a physical manga titled Link! Life! Love Live! and released August 1, 2024.

A 3DCG anime film was announced on June 8, 2025. Titled Love Live! Hasunosora Girls' High School Idol Club Bloom Garden Party, the film is produced and planned by Sunrise, animated by Sublimation and directed by Gō Kurosaki, with the screenplay by Fumiaki Maruto, Haruko Iizuka designing the characters, and Yoshiaki Fujisawa composing the music. It opened in Japanese theaters on May 8, 2026 with the Blu-ray by Emotion being available for purchase at cinemas on the same day.

An anime television series was announced on March 31, 2026. The staff members from the film are reprising their roles. It is set to premiere on January 10, 2027, on Tokyo MX and other networks, and will run for seven episodes covering the story of the 106th class from April to June.

=== Film ===
No.	Title	Insert song(s)	Original release date
1	"Love Live! Hasunosora Girls' High School Idol Club Bloom Garden Party"	"Hana Sakeba Yume Kakeru" "Hikari no Naka de Hana Saite"	May 8, 2026
Hasunosora is hosting the Bloom Garden Party, a cultural festival headlined by the School Idol Club; the 102nd class also returns to perform alongside the club's active members while the 103rd class prepares for their final live. The increased attention on the school leads to a traffic jam that includes a bus carrying middle school friends Aoi Reisawa and Maika Kinjo. Aoi, a fan of the club, worries the delay will cause them to miss the opening performance whereas Maika is uncaring. They begin walking to campus when they encounter Kaho, Ginko, and Ceras carrying audio equipment and offer to help. In return, the club tasks the two with filming the festival. Aoi films and interviews each subunit while Maika gradually develops an interest in them. Maika eventually encounters a lost child, who she is unable to console until Kaho arrives. As they walk together, Maika reveals she used to enjoy singing before becoming disillusioned, and tearfully laments that Kaho is graduating. Kaho reassures her that the remaining club members will also be a positive influence for her. Maika gives her Fes×LIVE ticket to the child and her mother. After the show, Maika and Aoi are found by the club and invited to their BGP staff-only concert. Ginko is entrusted with being the club's next president, and she breaks down at Kaho, Sayaka, and Rurino's impending departures. The club plays a final song as the 105th school year.

== See also ==
- There's No Freaking Way I'll be Your Lover! Unless..., a light novel series written by Teren Mikami
