= Kanna Kan =

Japanese singer and voice actress

- 菅 叶和
- Born: 19 November
- Occupations: Singer; voice actress
- Years active: 2023–present
- Employer: Tokyo Actor's Consumer's Cooperative Society
- Notable work: Rurino Ōsawa in Love Live! Hasunosora Girls' High School Idol Club
- Musical career
- Genre: J-pop
- Instrument: Voice
- Member of: Hasunosora Girls' High School Idol Club

Kanna Kan (Japanese: 菅 叶和, Hepburn: Kan Kanna; born 19 November) is a Japanese singer and voice actress from Tokyo, affiliated with Tokyo Actor's Consumer's Cooperative Society (Haikyō). She stars as Rurino Ōsawa in Love Live! Hasunosora Girls' High School Idol Club. She has also released several solo releases, with "Eureka" charting at the Billboard Japan Top Download Songs at #90.

== Biography ==
Kanna Kan, a native of Tokyo, was born on 19 November. During her school years, she was a basketball player, playing as a center due to her height. In an interview with Pia, she recalled that she became interested in music after getting her first mobile phone, and cites Majiko, Mr. Children, and Stardust Revue as infuences. She joined the Tokyo Actor's Consumer's Cooperative Society on 1 November 2022.

In February 2023, it was announced that Kan would star as Rurino Ōsawa in the Love Live! Hasunosora Girls' High School Idol Club sub-franchise, including the game Link! Like! Love Live!. She is a member of the unit Mira-Cra Park!, who have had five of its releases reach the Oricon Singles Chart Top 10. She reprised her role as Rurino in the sub-franchise's Bloom: Garden Party film.

On 25 July 2023, Kan made her solo radio host debut with Niconico Channel+'s Kan Kanna's Kangaeru na Kanjiro! Don't Think. Feel (菅叶和のカンがえるな、カンじろ！～Don't Think. Feel～). On 12 August 2024, she made her digital photobook debut with both Kanna to Vacance: BBQ-hen (かんなとばかんす～BBQ 編～) and Kanna to Vacance: Sauna-hen (かんなとばかんす～サウナ編～), as part of Weekly Playboy Gravure Japan's Voice Photobook series; each book features ASMR sounds, with the former involving chewing and the latter featuring intimate sounds. She won the Original Work Award at the Gravure Japan Awards 2024.

In addition to voice acting, Kan also releases solo music as an independent. She released two digital singles, "Eureka" and "Namida no Nioi", in 2025; the former, written by Kōhei Tsukada, peaked at the Billboard Japan Top Download Songs chart at #90.

=== Personal life and public image ===
Kan lists the Japanese tea ceremony as a special skill, having been influenced by a long-lasting family tradition of the practice and enjoying it since childhood. Takashi Saitō of Pia said that she is "popular for her cheerful personality".

In August and September 2024, Kan's Twitter/X account liked and reposted problematic posts related to her fans and co-workers. On 19 September, Kan denied that she made the posts, saying they may have been caused either by hacking or pocket dialing. On 27 September, Haikyō announced that she would be taking a break due to health issues caused by the problems with the account; revealed that the account had a high probability of being compromised, noting there were "direct messages (DMs) of unclear intent ... to multiple individuals on the same day" and several login error emails sent to the account's email address. She gradually resumed work afterwards, with the agency noting that she was taking her health into consideration.

== Discography ==
=== Animated film ===
Year	Title	Role	Ref.
2025	Love Live! Hasunosora Girls' High School Idol Club Bloom: Garden Party	Rurino Ōsawa	

=== Video games ===
Year	Title	Role	Ref.
2023	Link! Like! Love Live!	Rurino Ōsawa	
2023	Brown Dust	Chichi	
2024	Sega NET Mahjong MJ	Shousūshī	
2026	Brown Dust 2	Granade	
