= KamiKatsu =

Japanese manga series

- KamiKatsu: Working for God in a Godless World
- Cover of the first tankōbon volume

神無き世界のカミサマ活動 (Kaminaki Sekai no Kamisama Katsudō)
- Genre: Fantasy, isekai
- Manga

Working for God in a Godless World
- Written by: Aoi Akashiro
- Illustrated by: Sonshō Hangetsuban
- Published by: Hero's Inc.
- English publisher: NA: Titan Manga
- Magazine: Monthly Hero's (May 1, 2019 – October 30, 2020); Comiplex (November 27, 2020 – present)
- Original run: May 1, 2019 – present
- Volumes: 13
- Manga

The Godless World of Onee-chan
- Written by: Aoi Akashiro; Shinya Murata (composition)
- Illustrated by: Tokisada Hayami
- Published by: Hero's Inc.
- English publisher: NA: Titan Manga
- Magazine: Comiplex
- Original run: November 25, 2022 – present
- Volumes: 1
- Anime television series
- Directed by: Yuki Inaba
- Written by: Aoi Akashiro
- Music by: Yasunori Iwasaki
- Studio: Studio Palette
- Licensed by: Crunchyroll
- Original network: Tokyo MX, BS NTV, Kansai TV, Saga TV, AT-X
- Original run: April 6, 2023 – July 6, 2023
- Episodes: 12
- icon

KamiKatsu: Working for God in a Godless World (神無き世界のカミサマ活動, Kaminaki Sekai no Kamisama Katsudō; "What God Does in a World Without Gods") is a Japanese manga series written by Aoi Akashiro and illustrated by Sonshō Hangetsuban. It was initially serialized in Hero's Inc.'s seinen manga magazine Monthly Hero's from May 2019 to October 2020, before transferring to the Comiplex website since November 2020. The series has been collected into thirteen tankōbon volumes as of June 2026. An anime television series adaptation produced by Studio Palette aired from April to July 2023.

== Characters ==
=== Yukito's Kakuri ===
Yukito Urabe (卜部 征人, Urabe Yukito)
Voiced by: Junya Enoki (Japanese); Austin Tindle (English)
After being thrown by his father and his cult off a cliff into the sea as part of a ritual, he initially believed he died and was reincarnated in an isekai world, until he realized that he was still alive and was instead transported into a post-apocalyptic distant future where gods do not exist.
Yukito is immediately displeased, as he was finally hoping for death's release from his father's insane abuse; Mitama had brought him to this world to found the cult as a religion, so that she may gain followers.
Mitama (ミタマ)
Voiced by: Akari Kitō (Japanese); Sarah Wiedenheft (English)
The land goddess worshipped by Yukito’s cult. Mitama made the poor choice of Yukito as her acolyte, seemingly never paying attention to whether he was a believer in her; if it were not for her breaking down in tears and begging, Yukito would have ditched her off the bat.
Alural (アルラル, Aruraru)
Voiced by: Kana Hanazawa (Japanese); Bryn Apprill (English)
A girl who first found a time displaced Yukito and has an unhealthy obsession towards him.
Siluril (シルリル, Shiruriru)
Voiced by: Sumire Uesaka (Japanese); Lindsay Seidel (English)
The older sister of Alural.
Roy (ロイ, Roi)
Voiced by: Sho Fujisawa (Japanese); Travis Mullenix (English)
A resident pervert and a masochist in an isekai world which revealed to be a post-apocalyptic distant future, whom Yukito befriended.

=== Empire ===
Clen (クレン, Kuren) / Loki (ロキ, Roki)
Voiced by: Megumi Ogata (Japanese); Meli Grant (English)
The main antagonist first-half. Initially thought to be a regular civilian under male disguise named “Clen” whom Yukito befriended. In truth, she is actually an Archon (偽神(アルコーン), Nisegami(Arukōn); kanji: False Gods) who manipulates the entire events and knows the truth behind the Empire as Mitama does. Unfortunately, she ends up being betrayed by her recently new right hand girl resembling Mitama.
Enlilta Reesehyde Bertrand (エンリルタ・リースハイド・ベルトラン, Enriruta Rīsuhaido Berutoran)
Voiced by: Junichi Suwabe (male), Miyu Tomita (female) (Japanese); Bradley Gareth (male), Corey Pettit (female) (English)
Initially started out as a knight for the Empire. However, after being killed and resurrected by Mitama in retaliation for killing Yukito and the others whom he first befriended (save for “Clen”), his gender was swapped to his dismay.
Atar (アータル, Ātaru)
Voiced by: Aoi Yūki (Japanese); Emi Lo (English)
The youngest Archon who started out loyal to the Empire, until Mitama exposed the truth about the kingdom and Loki. Atar then joined Yukito's cult and became the second God, gaining half of Mitama's power by sharing believers.
Eudora (ユードラ, Yūdora)
A high ranked female knight of the Empire, who used to be a big fan of Beltrand before Mitama changed his gender.
Mitama (?) (ミタマ (?))
An entity who resembles original Mitama, and her existence cause the latter's power to go haywire. Initially start out as Loki's right hand, until she turns on her and stole her faith power for her own end.

=== Dakini ===
Dakini (ダキニ) / Gohonzon (御本尊)
Voiced by: Rie Takahashi (Japanese); Leah Clark (English)
A leader of an erotic cult with a gyaru attitude who claims to be a real goddess of lust. In reality, she is an Archon who borrowed the power of the real Dakini, and formerly loyal to the Empire, until they killed her first human friend.
Rish (リシュ, Rishu)
Voiced by: Mikako Komatsu
A member of Dakini cult, who is a surviving daughter of Gohonzon's late first friend, Touka (トウカ).
Dakini (Real) (ダキニ (本物), Dakini (Honmono))
A real goddess of lust.

=== Gaia ===
Gaia (ガイア)
Voiced by: Ami Koshimizu
Archon with a small stature and a leader of cult-like orphanage who borrows the power of the real Gaia, such as an ability to summon animals and beasts. Upon gaining a full Archon power, her body changes into an adult size woman. In the past prior to becoming an Archon, she was one of the researchers involved with the production of weapons that led Earth becoming a post-apocalyptic godless planet. Unlike Yukito, despite having similar background of having a parent who led their respective cult, she killed her mother in retaliation and willingly to kill all people in the Empire to get rid of Loki. She was a friend of one of the Thunder Archon twins, Jupiter during their time as the government's Anchors.
Cyan (シアン, Shian)
Voiced by: Rin Kurusu (Japanese); Hannah Alyea (English)
Kai (カイ, Kai)
Voiced by: Mutsumi Tamura (Japanese); Dusty Feeney (English)
Fau (ファウ, Fau)
Voiced by: Miyuki Akeno (Japanese); Monica Flatley (English)
Cain (ケイン, Kein)
Voiced by: Mari Hino (Japanese); Leo Matthews (English)
Yoshi (ヨシー, Yoshī)
Voiced by: Rie Kawamura (Japanese); Uku Leili (English)

=== Thunder Archon Twins ===
Summanus (スマナス, Samanasu)
An aspiring manga artist and one of the Thunder Archon twin siblings. Once a human who live a poverty live, they were forced into doing a scam cult activities by their abusive eldest sister, after their electric Archon powers awakened. After her younger sister Jupiter killed their eldest sister, they became the government's Archons, where they are tasked to protect lives from incoming enemies' missiles, and Jupiter befriended Gaia. Upon awakening at the distant future during a main event, Summanus initially being forced to work for Loki to infiltrate Mitama's Village when the former's younger sister is being held hostage into the Empire's energy source. Until Mitama's cult, including Gaia, helps her finds a way to free her sister.
Jupiter (ジュピター, Jupitā)
A younger twin sister alongside Summanus. She killed their abusive eldest human sister for both exploiting their newfound Archon powers and using them for her scam cult scheme. She started to lose memories of her past life with Summanus and sought their own deaths, the more they were both being used as pawns. When Summanus awakened in the distant future during a main event, it is revealed that Jupiter purposely let herself be the Empire's energy source and did not care about being held hostage by Loki, until Summanus gets help from Mitama's cult, including their old friend, Gaia to get her younger sister to come to her senses and restore her lost memories.

=== Past ===
Soichiro Urabe (卜部 聡一郎, Urabe Sōichirō)
Voiced by: Show Hayami (Japanese); Christopher Guerrero (English)
A father of Yukito and Chiyomaru.

=== Chiyomaru ===
Characters in the spin-off manga.

Chiyomaru Urabe (卜部 千夜丸, Urabe Chiyomaru)
The muscular older sister of Yukito with a brother complex towards him.
Ria (リヤ, Riya)
Norwe (ノルウ, Noruu)
Hephaestus (ヘパイストス, Hepaisutosu)

=== Others ===
Kama Mara (カーマ・マーラ, Kāma Māra)

== Media ==
=== Manga ===
Written by Aoi Akashiro and illustrated by Sonshō Hangetsuban, KamiKatsu: Working for God in a Godless World began serialization on Hero's Inc.'s seinen manga magazine Monthly Hero's on May 1, 2019. The series was transferred to the Comiplex website on November 27, 2020, after Monthly Hero's ceased publication on October 30 of the same year. As of June 29, 2026, thirteen tankōbon volumes have been released. The series is licensed in English by Titan Comics under the title Working for God in a Godless World.

A spin-off manga with composition by Shinya Murata and illustrated by Tokisada Hayami, titled The Godless World of Onee-chan (神無き世界のおねーちゃん活動, Kaminaki Sekai no Onee-chan Katsudō; "What My Older Sister Does in a World Without Gods"), began serialization on the Comiplex website on November 25, 2022. It has been collected in a single volume as of March 2023. The spin-off manga is also licensed in English by Titan Comics.

==== Volumes ====
| No. | Original release date | Original ISBN | English release date | English ISBN |
|---|---|---|---|---|
| 1 | February 5, 2020 | 978-4-86-468701-0 | December 17, 2024 | 978-1-78-774356-4 |
| 2 | July 4, 2020 | 978-4-86-468730-0 | February 18, 2025 | 978-1-78-774357-1 |
| 3 | January 29, 2021 | 978-4-86-468778-2 | July 8, 2025 | 978-1-78-774358-8 |
| 4 | September 29, 2021 | 978-4-86-468833-8 | November 18, 2025 | 978-1-78-774359-5 |
| 5 | April 27, 2022 | 978-4-86-468880-2 | April 14, 2026 | 978-1-78-774360-1 |
| 6 | November 29, 2022 | 978-4-86-468140-7 | — | — |
| 7 | May 29, 2023 | 978-4-86-468171-1 | — | — |
| 8 | December 27, 2023 | 978-4-86-468215-2 | — | — |
| 9 | June 28, 2024 | 978-4-86-468261-9 | — | — |
| 10 | December 26, 2024 | 978-4-86-805027-8 | — | — |
| 11 | June 30, 2025 | 978-4-86-805076-6 | — | — |
| 12 | December 26, 2025 | 978-4-86-805138-1 | — | — |
| 13 | June 29, 2026 | 978-4-86-805199-2 | — | — |

==== The Godless World of Onee-chan ====
| No. | Original release date | Original ISBN | English release date | English ISBN |
|---|---|---|---|---|
| 1 | March 29, 2023 | 978-4-86-468165-0 | April 1, 2025 | 978-1-78-774367-0 |

=== Anime ===
An anime television series adaptation was announced on April 26, 2022. It is produced by Studio Palette and directed by Yuki Inaba, with Yoshifumi Sueda serving as supervisor, Aoi Akashiro handling the scripts, Kaori Yoshikawa designing the characters, and Yasunori Iwasaki composing the music. The series aired from April 6 to July 6, 2023, on Tokyo MX and other networks. The opening theme song is "I Wish", performed by Rin Kurusu, and the ending theme song is "Steppin' Up Life!", performed by Akari Kitō. Crunchyroll is streaming the series along with an English dub.

==== Episodes ====
| No. | Title | Directed by | Written by | Storyboarded by | Original release date |
|---|---|---|---|---|---|
| 1 | "We know we are not worthy. O great Lord Mitama. Please purify us. Please cleanse us. Lord Mitama. We beg for you to hear our prayer." Transliteration: "Kakemakumokashikoki Mitamanoohomikami Harahitamahekiyometamaheto Mitama-no-mikoto Kashikomi-kashikomimawosu" (Japanese: カケマクモカシコキ ミタマノオホミカミ ハラヒタマヘキヨメタマヘト ミタマノミコト カシコミカシコミマヲス) | Yuki Inaba | Ohine Ezaki | Yuki Inaba | April 6, 2023 |
Yukito is son of a cult leader dedicated to the god Mitama. The cult drowns Yukito hoping he will be reborn as their next leader. Yukito earnestly wishes to be reborn in a world without religion. He awakens in a new world in an isolated village and makes friends with sisters Alura and Siluril, and farmers Clen and Roy. After a few weeks they visit the Imperial city so Alura and Roy can obtain pornographic magazines. Yukito witnesses a public mass suicide and learns without religion there is no fear of death, so when the government decides citizens are no longer of use or social deviants they proudly commit suicide. Alura and the villagers are all deviants who refused suicide due to fearing death. Alura was declared deviant due to her lustful personality. Alura and Silural disappear and Yukito learns outcasts can be executed at any time. Silural has already been hanged and while attempting to rescue Alura both she and Yukito are killed. Dying again, Yukito prays to Mitama who manifest as a young girl, having been impatiently waiting for him to summon her as the next cult leader. Mitama murders the government soldiers and resurrects Yukito and Alura, excited to be the only God of a brand new world.
| 2 | "We know we are not worthy. O great Lord Mitama. Beautiful is—" Transliteration: "Kakemakumokashikoki Mitamanoohomikami Kusushikutahenarumitamanofuyuniyorite Konoutsushiyoniareidetaruminishiareba Yorozunomonotsukuritamahiki Mitama-no-mikoto Kikoshimeseto Kashikomi-kashikomimawosu" (Japanese: カケマクモカシコキ ミタマノオホミカミ クスシクタヘナルミタマノフユニヨリテ コノウツシヨニアレイデタルミニシアレバ ヨロヅノモノツクリタマヒキ ミタマノミコト キコシメセト カシコミカシコミマヲス) | Yūki Matsumoto | Deko Akao | Yūki Matsumoto | April 13, 2023 |
Mitama also resurrects Siluril and other hanged deviants. Unable to understand what a God is Alura jealously assume Mitama is Yukito's lover. Fearing government revenge Yukito asks Mitama about her powers and is despondent to learn that due to having no believers in this new world she has no powers left. As there is a chance the government will send an army to their village Yukito needs to somehow get 10,000 people to worship Mitama and make her a God again. Roy, having discovered he enjoys masochism, becomes Mitama's first believer when she treats him with disgust. Mitama is disappointed that Yukito still does not really believe in her. Mitama's attempt to demonstrate her godly knowledge falls flat when she merely lists embarrassing events from Yukito's childhood. Yukito also fails to inspire belief in the villagers using fortune-telling and magic tricks. Alura's pet fox, Chilchil, dies from poison so Mitami uses the single spark of magic from Roy's belief to resurrect Chilchil, causing both Alura and Siluril to believe. With some power returned Mitama agrees to Alura's request to resurrect the soldiers she murdered, as they were innocent men following orders. The soldiers commander, Bertrandt, is furious when Mitama resurrects him as a woman.
| 3 | "We know we are not worthy. O great Lord Mitama. You who rule over all the hills of Takaamahara. All our—" Transliteration: "Kakemakumokashikoki Mitamanoohomikami Takaamaharanotsukasanimashimashite Moromoronomagagoto Magatsuhi Tsumikegarewo Harahitamahekiyometamaheto Ohotsuchinomototsukami Mitama-no-mikoto Kikoshimeseto Kashikomi-kashikomimawosu" (Japanese: カケマクモカシコキ ミタマノオホミカミ タカアマハラノツカサニマシマシテ モロモロノマガゴト マガツヒ ツミケガレヲ ハラヒタマヘキヨメタマヘト オホツチノモトツカミ ミタマノミコト キコシメセト カシコミカシコミマヲス) | Tatsuji Yamazaki | Ohine Ezaki | Tatsuji Yamazaki | April 20, 2023 |
Bertrand attempts to return to the Imperial government but with his female body is rejected as a nameless deviant. Bertrand is forced to accept Yukito's offer to live in the village, accepting a job as Mitama's Holy Knight. Using questionable recruiting methods Yukito gains Mitama another 100 worshippers by offering benefits to members only, such as priority protection from monsters and access to Mitama's healing magic. Bertrand, forced by Alura and Siluril to wear female clothes, informs Yukito the Imperial army's power comes from Archons, individual warriors granted powerful abilities by the Emperor. Yukito is fascinated by Bertrand's sword, which appears to be magical but was created by the Emperor. The Archon Atar is tasked with destroying the village yet keeps being delayed by monsters appearing from nowhere. Yukito is abruptly inspired by a memory of his father who points out that most religions become popular through martial arts training. With Clem's approval Yukito decides to drag the deviants into the 21st century. One month later Atar arrives and encounters Bertrand, now in even more risqué outfits, and decides to kidnap him to determine how his gender was altered. Atar is shocked by the village's drastic changes as they now possess modern technology including wind turbine generators, motorised vehicles and industrial sized farmlands.
| 4 | "We know we are not worthy. O great Lord Mitama. You have aaahhhhh—" Transliteration: "Kakemakumokashikoki Mitamanoohomikami Utsushiyowoshimeshitamahi Hajimemonakuwoharimonaku Tennoshichiyoukuyounijūhasshukuwokiyome Chinosanjūrokujinwokiyometamaheto Ametsuchino Mitama-no-mikoto Kikoshimeseto Kashikomi-kashikomimawosu" (Japanese: カケマクモカシコキ ミタマノオホミカミ ウツシヨヲシメシタマヒ ハジメモナクヲハリモナク テンノシチヨウクヨウニジュウハッシュクヲキヨメ チノサンジュウロクジンヲキヨメタマヘト アメツチノ ミタマノミコト キコシメセト カシコミカシコミマヲス) | Hitoshi Motoi | Ohine Ezaki | Yoshifumi Sueda & Yuki Inaba | April 27, 2023 |
It is shown Yukito had Mitama summon modern technology, the use of which he restricted to Mitama's believers. Mitama soon had almost 2000 believers. Yukito also introduced Exclusivity, the idea that believers are superior to non-believers. Clem admitted he is not actually a deviant; he once worked in the Emperors palace but grew disillusioned with that life and voluntarily moved into the deviant's village. Yukito wondered why the concept of Gods never arose to explain unexplainable events like natural disasters. Bertrandt explained all such events are explained by members of the Assembly who work under the Emperor, thus nothing has ever been “unexplainable”. Yukito learns Atar has captured Bertrandt. Atar determines modern technology is blasphemy against the Emperor and the Assembly. With the power of 2000 believers Mitama fights against Atar's Archon power but Mitama runs out of power first. Confused and enraged by their defiance Atar destroys the village, only for it to reappear unharmed. Atar realises it was an illusion just as Clem reveals he is actually a woman under an illusion disguise, Loki the Archon. Having infiltrated the village as a spy she decides Yukito and Mitama are just who she needs to help assassinate the Emperor.
| 5 | "We know we are not worthy. O great Lord Mitama. You created all things—" Transliteration: "Kakemakumokashikoki Mitamanoohomikami Yorozunomono Tsukuritamahikiha Rokukonshōjōnishite Ametsuchinoyorozumonotodoutainarugayuweni Kakarutoyoashiharamizuhonokuninisumawasetamaheto Mawosukotonoyoshiwo Ohotsuchino Mitama-no-mikoto Kikoshimesetokashikomikashikomimawosu" (Japanese: カケマクモカシコキ ミタマノオホミカミ ヨロズノモノ ツクリタマヒキハ ロクコンショウジョウニシテ アメツチノヨロズモノトドウタイナルガユヱニ カカルトヨアシハラミズホノクニニスマワセタマヘト マヲスコトノヨシヲ オホツチノ ミタマノミコト キコシメセトカシコミカシコミマヲス) | Motomasa Maeda & Yuki Inaba | Deko Akao | Motomasa Maeda & Yuki Inaba | May 4, 2023 |
Loki takes Atar, Yukito and Mitama to the Emperor but reveals he is an illusion and the castle a giant machine named Assembly that controls the Empire with the suicide system to ensure it always remains the same. Mitama reveals people did destroy the world in religious war; the survivors building Assembly to ensure religion was forgotten. Yukito realises he was not reborn in an alternate world; Mitama just sent him thousands of years into Earth's future after religion died out. Loki is tired of Assembly and offers to let them destroy it. Yukito doubts Loki's motives so she reveals she discovered from Assembly how humans once had free will. She began infiltrating deviant villages to learn free will but deduced they were also under indirect Assembly control. Then Yukito appeared, bringing God with him, the pinnacle of a being capable of free will. Desiring this for herself Loki convinced another deviant village she was God and found their belief gave her God-like powers. Thus she and the Archons, except Atar, plotted to destroy Assembly and become Gods. Yukito agrees free will is preferable so Mitama destroys Assembly by sprouting a giant tree under it. Loki is surprised when Yukito, knowing the Archons would make terrible Gods, swears to help Mitama defeat them and become the one true God.
| 6 | "We know we are not worthy. O great Lord Mitama"; Transliteration: "Kakemakumokashikoki Mitamanoohomikami Tokoyononahohiha Amaharaniariteha Hinomikunitsukinomikunihoshinomikuni Ohotsuchiniariteha Awohitokusawohajime Ikiarumoikinakimo Yoniaritoshiarumononokagiri Tokoyonoohokami Mitama-no-mikoto Kikoshimesetokashikomikashikomimawosu" (Japanese: カケマクモカシコキ ミタマノオホミカミ トコヨノナホヒハ アマハラニアリテハ ヒノミクニツキノミクニホシノミクニ オホツチニアリテハ アヲヒトクサヲハジメ イキアルモイキナキモ ヨニアリトシアルモノノカギリ トコヨノオホカミ ミタマノミコト キコシメセトカシコミカシコミマヲス) | Yuki Inaba & Hitoshi Motoi | Aoi Akashiro | Motomasa Maeda & Yuki Inaba | May 11, 2023 |
Loki leaves the powerless Atar with Yukito. Loki temporarily turns Bertrand back into a man, so she follows Loki to the Empire to hopefully become a man again permanently. Atar considers suicide until Yukito gives her hope of becoming a God herself and rebuilding Assembly. Alura assumes Yukito is a lolicon. Yukito announces Atar is now their second God; granting her half of Mitama's power by sharing believers. Siluril discovers the Archon Dakini already has 10,000 believers, having based her religion around sex, lust and perversion, with priestesses titled Sluts. Yukito decides to infiltrate the church with Mitama, Roy and Alura as fake believers, and hijack the 10,000 believers from the inside. Riche, the Chief Slut, takes them to Dakini for initiation. Yukito panics when initiation involves being locked in a room with Alura while under a powerful lust spell. Due to training he received from his father he manages to resist until Mitama rescues them. The unused lust energy passes into Riche when she enters the room, causing her to orgasm and reveal she is actually a virgin who does not believe in Dakini. Realising Mitama is also a God she requests her help in destroying Dakini's perverse religion.
| 7 | "We know we are not worthy. O great Lord Mitama. All living beings were born by" Transliteration: "Kakemakumokashikoki Mitamanoohomikami Mototsumikokoronomanimani Umushiide Ushihakimamori Sakihahetamaherumiisawono Ohokihisashikihirokiatsuki Ohomuutsukushimiwokagafurite Konoutsushiyoni Aramukagiriha Yorozunomototsuhitotsukamino Mitama-no-mikoto Kikoshimesetokashikomikashikomimawosu" (Japanese: カケマクモカシコキ ミタマノオホミカミ モトツミココロノマニマニ ウムシイデ ウシハキマモリ サキハヘタマヘルミイサヲノ オホキヒサシキヒロキアツキ オホムウツクシミヲカゞフリテ コノウツシヨニ アラムカギリハ ヨロズノモトツヒトツカミノ ミタマノミコト キコシメセトカシコミカシコミマヲス) | Tatsuji Yamazaki | Ohine Ezaki | Tatsuji Yamazaki | May 18, 2023 |
Loki shows Bertrand without Assembly society has begun to fail. Riche admits she was a Deviant whose love of porn made her a sex expert, so she was made Chief Slut for her erotic knowledge and fake expertise. Yukito promises to destroy the church, so she approves their fake membership. Mitama weakens as her absence causes her followers to spend more time worshipping Atar. Yukito has Riche spread modern sexual knowledge, toys and medications summoned from Japan, causing Dakini's followers to similarly neglect worshipping the absent Dakini to worship Riche. Furious, Dakini brainwashes Roy by teaching him masturbation is acceptable, so he betrays their plot. Yukito, Riche, Mitama and Alura are accused of heresy but Riche, having been sadistically tutored in acting by Yukito, convincingly fakes utter loyalty to Dakini and begs to be punished at their trial. This gains the support of Dakini's believers; since someone so clearly loyal to Dakini could not be a heretic. Faced with a possible rebellion Dakini postpones the trial and imprisons them. Roy affirms his loyalty to Dakini and abandons them. Yukito begins planning their escape but their cell is abruptly visited by Dakini's inhumanly strong, most loyal bodyguards, the Purgers.
| 8 | "We know we are not worthy. O great Lord Mitama. Evil cannot touch" Transliteration: "Kakemakumokashikoki Mitamanoohomikami Magatsuhinotameni Kegashiyaburarerukotonaku Kinoekinotohinoehinototsuchinoetsuchinotokanoekanotomizunoemizunoto Hifumiyoimunayakoto Ninootofuruheyurayuratofuruhe Kakuinoriseshikotonoyoshiwo Ohokuninomototsuhitotsukamino Mitama-no-mikoto Kikoshimeseto Kashikomi-kashikomimawosu" (Japanese: カケマクモカシコキ ミタマノオホミカミ マガツヒノタメニ ケガシヤブラレルコトナク キノエキノトヒノエヒノトツチノエツチノトカノエカノトミズノエミズノト ヒフミヨイムナヤコト ニノオトフルヘユラユラトフルヘ カクイノリセシコトノヨシヲ オホクニノモトツヒトツカミノ ミタマノミコト キコシメセト カシコミカシコミマヲス) | Yūki Matsumoto & Yuki Inaba | Deko Akao | Masayoshi Nishida & Yuki Inaba | June 1, 2023 (Note: Delayed by one week due to "various circumstances") |
Dakini remembers Assembly created her power to restrict human love so Assembly could ensure population control by growing babies artificially. After thousands of years humans became infertile and incapable of love. Quietly rebelling against Assembly Dakini created pornography and reawakened love in a percentage of the population, in particular a deviant named Toka. When Toka became pregnant she was murdered so Dakini swore to make humans love again no matter what. Yukito and the others are rescued from the Purgers by Atar and Siluril. Atar is now worshipped by over 6000 of Mitama's believers and can now defeat the weakened Dakini herself. Unfortunately, Dakini reveals even after Riche stole some of her believers she still has over 14,000 remaining. Riche is revealed to be Toka's daughter. Dakini infects Atar, Alura and Siluril with uncontrollable lust, so they molest Yukito. Mitama rescues them, having borrowed Riche's 1500 believers and, as a real God compared to the fake Archon's, defeats Dakini easily despite having fewer believers. Dakini tries to escape but is caught by Roy; Yukito having convinced him that betraying Dakini would make Mitama lust for him. Defeated, Dakini breaks down crying as Riche's resemblance to Toka makes her realise she was the one who destroyed human love, not Assembly, and she begs for Toka's forgiveness.
| 9 | "We know we are not worthy. O great Lord Mitama. Your perfectly pur—" Transliteration: "Kakemakumokashikoki Mitamanoohomikamino Nahohikokoroni Tsumikegareayamachiarashimezu Yorozunomononotaguhinariidenkantakaraha Ihayuru Okitsukagamihetsukagamiyatsukanotsurugiikutamamakarugaheshinotamatarutamamichikaheshinotamaorochinohirehachinohirekusagusamononohiretoifu Mitama-no-mikoto Kikoshimeseto Kashikomi-kashikomimawosu" (Japanese: カケマクモカシコキ ミタマノオホミカミノ ナホヒココロニ ツミケガレアヤマチアラシメズ ヨロズノモノゝタグヒナリイデンカンタカラハ イハユル オキツカゞミヘツカゞミヤツカノツルギイクタママカルガヘシノタマタルタマミチカヘシノタマオロチノヒレハチノヒレクサグサモノゝヒレトイフ ミタマノミコト キコシメセト カシコミカシコミマヲス) | Yuki Inaba & Hitoshi Motoi | Ohine Ezaki | Tatsuji Yamazaki | June 8, 2023 |
Riche pretends to betray Yukito so Dakini can lead the church again. This allows Yukito and the others to sneak away. Including Riche's followers Mitama finally has 10,000 followers and becomes a full God again. Returning home they find monsters completely destroyed the village. Despite only just becoming a God again Mitama uses up her power repairing the village. Archon Gaia,, who controls monsters appears and explains destroying the village was an accident. Since she only has 2 believers she is too weak to keep her monsters under control. She wants to help defeat Loki as she does not agree with Archons fighting each other. Everyone visits the city but finds Loki has built a giant wall around it. Bertrand is still female and so miserable she wants to die. Loki has near ultimate power with 1,120,000 believers, though she is confused when Yukito laughs at so small a number and leaves, taking Bertrand with them. At the village Yukito is relieved his tough guy act worked since he has no idea how to defeat Loki. Bertrand reveals society has recovered already and runs like it did under Assembly, only with Loki as Emperor. Yukito realises Loki's believers must have some residual loyalty to the old Emperor, meaning stealing them will be easy if he makes Mitama more popular than Loki, by turning her into a teen idol.
| 10 | "We know we are not worthy. O great Lord Mitama"; Transliteration: "Kakemakumokashikoki Mitamanoohomikami Aratamanigitamani Moromoronofujouwomizu Tsukushiteumukotonaku Tsutometeokotarukotonaku Uyamahikashikomimotsukahematsurusamawo Tahirakekuyasurakekukikoshimeshite Sorekamihayuwiitsunishitemikatanashi Kyonishitereiari Ametsuchihiraketekonokata Tokoyonoohomikamino Mitama-no-mikoto Kikoshimeseto Kashikomi-kashikomimawosu" (Japanese: カケマクモカシコキ ミタマノオホミカミ アラタマニギタマニ モロモロノフジョウヲミズ ツクシテウムコトナク ツトメテオコタルコトナク ウヤマヒカシコミモツカヘマツルサマヲ タヒラケクヤスラケクキコシメシテ ソレカミハユヰイツニシテミカタナシ キョニシテレイアリ アメツチヒラケテコノカタ トコヨノオホミカミノ ミタマノミコト キコシメセト カシコミカシコミマヲス) | Ken'ichi Higaki & Yuki Inaba | Deko Akao | Ken'ichi Higaki & Yuki Inaba | June 15, 2023 |
Yukito forms an idol group of Siluril, Alura, Gaia and Atar that becomes popular very quickly; since Assembly erased all music Yukito has reinvented it. Yukito confirms Mitama's power does not only depend on number of followers but also on depth of faith, so a God with fewer followers could still defeat Loki if her followers are more devout, and thanks to music Mitama's followers are more devout than ever. Yukito sends Bertrand to spy on Gaia, who has begun acting secretive, and discovers Gaia has adopted several children as her private, very small group of loyal followers. Yukito decides to crush Gaia, since the depth of devotion a child has for a parent is immeasurable and could make Gaia very dangerous. Bertrand develops a crush on Yukito and attempts to molest him. This turns out to be a prank by Dakini, though it confirms Bertrand is starting to accept his female body and mind, to his horror. Dakini is now a huge music fan as her followers enjoy playing music during sex. Yukito keeps Gaia busy with idol training, allowing Dakini to make the children love her so as to save them from Gaia's schemes. The eldest children, Kai and Cyan, are stubbornly loyal to Gaia and reveal they possess Gaia's skill to control monsters they use to attack Dakini.
| 11 | "We know we are not worthy. O great Lord Mitama. In the ancient tim—" Transliteration: "Kakemakumokashikoki Mitamanoohomikami Inishini Ohoyashimaametsuchihirakenohajime Kunitsuchinoukaretadayofukoto Tatoheba Nahomidzunouheniukaberuaburanogototokini Ametsuchinonakanihitotsunomononareri Sunahachikamitonaru Mitama-no-mikototo Mawoshimatsuru Yorozunomonowo Tsukasadoritamahite Awohitokusawo Youikushitamafu Yorozumototsu Mitama-no-mikoto Kikoshimeseto Kashikomi-kashikomimawosu" (Japanese: カケマクモカシコキ ミタマノオホミカミ イニシニ オホヤシマアメツチヒラケノハジメ クニツチノウカレタゞヨフコト タトヘバ ナホミヅノウヘニウカベルアブラノゴトトキニ アメツチノナカニヒトツノモノナレリ スナハチカミトナル ミタマノミコトト マヲシマツル ヨロズノモノヲ ツカサドリタマヒテ アヲヒトクサヲ ヨウイクシタマフ ヨロズモトツ ミタマノミコト キコシメセト カシコミカシコミマヲス) | Yuki Inaba | Aoi Akashiro | Masayoshi Nishida & Yuki Inaba | June 29, 2023 |
Gaia reappears. Cyan and Kai are overjoyed to see her, but Gaia reveals she does not need them anymore and summons her most powerful monster, Typhon the Living Fortress that absorbs Cyan and Kai. Alura and Siluril arrive with a truck to rescue everyone. Gaia's son Yushii explains Typhon is very loyal, so once it is summoned it is controllable without using magic. They also reveal Gaia based Typhon on a book from the old civilisation before Assembly. Typhon's main body, which is even larger, attacks the truck eating Yukito and Mitama. At the village everyone realises without them their religion will probably fall apart. Yukito awakens inside Typhon, which has rooms like a castle, with Mitama, Cyan and Kai. Gaia reveals she has already killed Yukito 300 times but each time Mitama's love keeps bringing him back as an immortal. She explains the old civilization created Archons through genetic engineering, but some humans rejected science to live in nature. Gaia's mother was leader of one such group who used Gaia as a tool to gain power. Unable to bear the abuse Gaia murdered her and ran away, later being turned into an Archon by the government. Gaia is tired of leaders manipulating people for selfish goals and intends to stop them permanently. Yukito realises he has become just like his father, manipulating people for power. The whole deviant village chases after Typhon on a mobile platform, with Mitama's music group rallying them in support of Yukito whom they demand Gaia releases.
| 12 | "We know we are not worthy. O great Lord Mitama. On the throne—" Transliteration: "Kakemakumoitomokashikoki Mitamanoohomikami Konokamidokoni Masematsuru Kakemakumoayanikashikoki Ohokaminoohomaheni Kashikomikashikomimomawosaku Ohokamino Hirokiatsukimitamanofuyuniyorite Magakaminomagagotonaku Sukoyakaninarihahinokotogotoni Isoshimitsutomeruwomochite Ametsuchinokamuwazanitagahashimezu Hirakeyoniokureshimezu Kusagusanowazawahinaku Yonomamorihinomamori Megumisakihahitamaheto Misoraharukaniworogamimatsurakuwo Tahirakeku Yasurakeku Kikoshimeshite Imamoyukusakimo Iyatouniiyanagani Ohokaminotakakitafutoki Mitamanofuyuniyorite Tachisakaeshimetamaheto Mitama-no-mikoto Kikoshimeseto Kashikomi-kashikomimawosu" (Japanese: カケマクモイトモカシコキ ミタマノオホミカミ コノカミドコニ マセマツル カケマクモアヤニカシコキ オホカミノオホマヘニ カシコミカシコミモマヲサク オホカミノ ヒロキアツキミタマノフユニヨリテ マガカミノマガゴトナク スコヤカニナリハヒノコトゴトニ イソシミツトメルヲモチテ アメツチノカムワザニタガハシメズ ヒラケヨニオクレシメズ クサグサノワザワヒナク ヨノマモリヒノマモリ メグミサキハヒタマヘト ミソラハルカニヲロガミマツラクヲ タヒラケク ヤスラケク キコシメシテ イマモユクサキモ イヤトウニイヤナガニ オホカミノタカキタフトキ ミタマノフユニヨリテ タチサカエシメタマヘト ミタマノミコト キコシメセト カシコミカシコミマヲス) | Hitoshi Motoi | Aoi Akashiro | Motomasa Maeda & Yuki Inaba | July 6, 2023 |
The villagers, their belief at an all time high thanks to the music, empower Atar to attack Typhon, but it heals itself. Mitama begs Yukito to finally believe in her so she can save him. He declares his belief in her, allowing her the power to free him, then immediately declares he was only joking, infuriating Mitama. Atar announces she is retiring as a god and urges her believers to believe in Mitama; they agree but only after Riche announces Atar will be joining Dakini's cult for erotic services. Mitama is freed, restrains Typhon and stabs Gaia in the heart. Typhon explodes, freeing everybody inside. Kai tries to kill the weakened Gaia for her betrayal but Cyan stops him as she had realised, in her own twisted way, Gaia really did just want a family, so Gaia reconciles with her children. Kai, who deeply loves Cyan, agrees to monitor Gaia for Yukito to help protect Cyan. Yukito realises Mitama now has 30,000 followers, exceeding the number of available villagers. Loki appears to Yukito privately, explaining she secretly gave Mitama some of her believers to stop Typhon without risking her own life, then departs to await Yukito's arrival at the capital. Yukito is retrieved by his friends who insist he join their chaotic victory celebrations. Yukito wonders if people really need gods when sometimes having each other feels like enough.
