= Null & Peta =

Japanese multimedia franchise

ぬるぺた
- Created by: Hato
- Anime television series
- Directed by: Hirofumi Ogura
- Written by: Hato
- Music by: Yūki Kishida
- Studio: Shin-Ei Animation
- Licensed by: Crunchyroll
- Original network: AT-X, Chiba TV
- Original run: October 4, 2019 – December 20, 2019
- Episodes: 12
- Video game

Null & Peta: Invasion of the Queen Bug
- Developer: Tokyotoon
- Publisher: Hobibox; Shiravune
- Platform: Windows
- Released: WW: January 30, 2020

Null & Peta (Japanese: ぬるぺた) is a Japanese multimedia franchise created by Hato. It consisted of an anime television series produced by Shin-Ei Animation and a video game developed by Tokyotoon and published by Hobibox and Shiravune. The former aired from October to December 2019, while the latter was released in January 2020.

== Characters ==
Null (ぬる, Nuru)
Voiced by: Azumi Waki
Peta (ぺた)
Voiced by: Reina Ueda

== Media ==
=== Anime ===
The series was first announced by Tokyotoon and Shin-Ei Animation in July 2019. The series was created and scripted by Hato, with Shin-Ei Animation producing the animation, Hirofumi Ogura directing, Eku Takeshima designing the characters, and Yūki Kishida composing the music. The series theme song is "#Null*Peta", performed by the main cast members. The series aired from October 4 to December 20, 2019. Internationally, the series is licensed by Crunchyroll outside of Asia.

==== Episode list ====
| No. | Title (Note: All English titles are taken from Crunchyroll.) | Original release date |
|---|---|---|
| 1 | "Sister Complete!"; Transliteration: "Onee-chan Kansei!" (Japanese: お姉ちゃん完成！) | October 4, 2019 |
| 2 | "My Big Sister's Perfect Food!"; Transliteration: "Onee-chan no Kanzen Eiyōshoku!" (Japanese: お姉ちゃんの完全栄養食！) | October 11, 2019 |
| 3 | "Big Sister, Do I Have to Go to School?"; Transliteration: "Onee-chan Gakkō Ikanakya Dame?" (Japanese: お姉ちゃん学校行かなきゃダメ？) | October 18, 2019 |
| 4 | "Big Sister, Do I Have to Go to Space?"; Transliteration: "Onee-chan Uchū Ikanakya Dame?" (Japanese: お姉ちゃん宇宙行かなきゃダメ？) | October 25, 2019 |
| 5 | "My Big Sister Is Dead?!"; Transliteration: "Onee-chan Izu Deddo!?" (Japanese: お姉ちゃんイズデッド！？) | November 1, 2019 |
| 6 | "Big Sister, What's Your Favorite Snow Cone Flavor?"; Transliteration: "Onee-chan Kakigōri no Shiroppu Nani ha?" (Japanese: お姉ちゃんかき氷のシロップなに派？) | November 8, 2019 |
| 7 | "My Big Sister's Acting Suspicious!?"; Transliteration: "Onee-chan wa Fushinsha!?" (Japanese: お姉ちゃんは不審者！？) | November 15, 2019 |
| 8 | "My Big Sister's Bugging Out!"; Transliteration: "Onee-chan Baguru!" (Japanese: お姉ちゃんバグる！) | November 22, 2019 |
| 9 | "My Big Sister's Brutal With A Hammer!"; Transliteration: "Onee-chan tte Yaban'na Hanmā!" (Japanese: お姉ちゃんって野蛮なハンマー！) | November 29, 2019 |
| 10 | "I Think Of My Sister, Therefore My Sister Is"; Transliteration: "Onee-chan Omou Yue ni Ane Ari" (Japanese: お姉ちゃん思うゆえに姉あり) | December 6, 2019 |
| 11 | "Big Sister, Big Sister, Big Sister!"; Transliteration: "Onee-chan, Onee-chan, Onee-chan!" (Japanese: お姉ちゃん、お姉ちゃん、お姉ちゃん！) | December 13, 2019 |
| 12 | "Null and Peta"; Transliteration: "Nuru Peta" (Japanese: ぬるぺた) | December 20, 2019 |

=== Video game ===
A video game for the franchise was announced at the same time as the anime. Titled Null & Peta: Invasion of the Queen Bug, the game was released on PC on January 30, 2020. It was developed by Tokyotoon and published by Hobibox and Shiravune.

== Reception ==
Gary Hartley from Honest Gamers criticized the gameplay of the game as barebones while praising the visuals and characters.

== See also ==
- Whisper Me a Love Song, a manga series written and illustrated by Eku Takeshima
- There's No Freaking Way I'll be Your Lover! Unless..., a yuri light novel series illustrated by Eku Takeshima
