= There's No Freaking Way I'll be Your Lover! Unless... =

Light novel series and its adaptations

- First English light novel volume cover, featuring Renako Amaori (left) and Mai Oduka (right)

わたしが恋人になれるわけないじゃん、ムリムリ！（※ムリじゃなかった!?） (Watashi ga Koibito ni Nareru Wakenaijan, Muri Muri! (*Muri Janakatta!?))
- Genre: Yuri; Harem; Romantic comedy
- Light novel
- Written by: Teren Mikami
- Illustrated by: Eku Takeshima
- Published by: Shueisha
- English publisher: NA: Seven Seas Entertainment
- Imprint: Dash X Bunko
- Original run: February 21, 2020 – present
- Volumes: 8 + 2 short story collections
- Manga
- Written by: Teren Mikami
- Illustrated by: Musshu
- Published by: Shueisha
- English publisher: NA: Seven Seas Entertainment
- Imprint: Young Jump Comics
- Magazine: Dash X Comic
- Original run: May 15, 2020 – July 31, 2026
- Volumes: 9
- Anime television series
- Directed by: Natsumi Uchinuma
- Written by: Naruhisa Arakawa
- Music by: Yoshiaki Fujisawa
- Studio: Studio Mother
- Licensed by: Remow
- Original network: Tokyo MX, SUN, BS11, AT-X
- Original run: July 8, 2025 – January 1, 2026
- Episodes: 17
- Anime film

There's No Freaking Way I'll Be Your Lover! Unless... ~Next Shine~
- Directed by: Natsumi Uchinuma
- Written by: Naruhisa Arakawa
- Music by: Yoshiaki Fujisawa
- Studio: Studio Mother
- Licensed by: Remow
- Released: November 21, 2025
- Runtime: 110 minutes
- Manga

There's No Freaking Way I'll be Your Lover! Unless... Second Season
- Written by: Teren Mikami
- Illustrated by: Eru Kudō
- Published by: Shueisha
- Magazine: Dash X Comic
- Original run: Q1 2027 – scheduled
- icon

There's No Freaking Way I'll be Your Lover! Unless... (Japanese: わたしが恋人になれるわけないじゃん、ムリムリ！（※ムリじゃなかった!?）, Hepburn: Watashi ga Koibito ni Nareru Wakenaijan, Muri Muri! (*Muri Janakatta!?)), also known as WataNare (わたなれ) for short, is a Japanese yuri light novel series written by Teren Mikami and illustrated by Eku Takeshima. Shueisha has released eight volumes since February 2020 under their Dash X Bunko imprint. A manga adaptation with art by Musshu was serialized on Shueisha's Dash X Comic section of the Niconico Seiga website from May 2020 to July 2026, with a second part illustrated by Eru Kudō launching on the same section in Q1 2027. Both the light novel and manga are licensed in North America by Seven Seas Entertainment. An anime television series adaptation produced by Studio Mother aired from July to September 2025. A sequel aired in January 2026.

== Plot ==
Renako Amaori spent her middle school years as a non-attending student with no friends. In high school, she is committed to getting the most out of her time. To accomplish this, she approaches the most popular girl in school, Mai Oduka. As soon as the school year begins, she is successful in joining her group of friends. However, pretending to be one of the popular girls when she has always been a loner is mentally taxing, and so as Renako walks alone to the school's rooftop one day to unwind, Mai discovers her and believes she is preparing to end her life. The miscommunication actually ends with both of them opening up to each other, and Renako returns home ecstatic that she has finally met someone to call her best friend. At least until Mai confesses her love the following day and asks her out. Renako is puzzled by the sudden confession, but Mai suggests that they play a game to see which relationship is more suitable for them: "best friend" or "lover".

== Characters ==
Renako Amaori (甘織 れな子, Amaori Renako)
Voiced by: Ayaka Ōhashi (PV), Kanna Nakamura (anime)
The protagonist and narrator of the series. Renako is a first-year high school student who seeks to reform herself as an extrovert after having been a socially anxious recluse in middle school, which she is embarrassed about. Renako is initially reluctant to engage in any romantic relationships, feeling that staying friends would be preferable. However, she later admits her homosexuality and begins dating both Mai and Ajisai in a consensual non-monogamous relationship. She is an avid gamer, having taken up the hobby from her father.
Mai Ozuka (王塚 真唯, Ōzuka Mai)
Voiced by: Azusa Tadokoro (PV), Saori Ōnishi (anime)
A teenage supermodel who is the daughter of Renée Oduka, a prominent fashion designer. As Renako's classmate, Mai is a highly popular student, known by the student body as the school's "super darling". She exudes a confident persona, but secretly is overwhelmed by her popularity and her mother's lofty expectations. Mai falls in love with Renako after the latter encourages her to take breaks from maintaining her persona. Outside of school and her modeling career, she is also skilled in playing the guitar and in calligraphy.
Ajisai Sena (瀬名 紫陽花, Sena Ajisai)
Voiced by: Manaka Iwami (PV), Yukari Anzai (anime)
Renako's friend and classmate. Ajisai has two younger brothers who she is often responsible for taking care of while her parents are working, which she finds stressful. She harbors strong affections for Renako, and Renako, in turn, is deeply infatuated with Ajisai, often referring to her as an "angel" in her internal monologue.
Satsuki Koto (琴 紗月, Koto Satsuki)
Voiced by: Kana Ichinose
Mai's childhood friend and longstanding rival. Satsuki resents Mai, and is often fiercely competitive with her, often losing out to her. She becomes girlfriends with Renako on a temporary basis in order to spite Mai by provoking her jealousy. Due to being poor, she also works a part-time job, a secret known only to Renako.
Kaho Koyanagi (小柳 香穂, Koyanagi Kaho)
Voiced by: Takako Tanaka
An enthusiastic girl who is considered the "little sister" figure of Mai's group. It is revealed later in the series that she was Renako's friend in middle school, previously known as Kaho Minaguchi, her family name having changed after her parents divorced and remarried. She has a significant online following as a popular cosplayer. Like Renako, Kaho is secretly introverted but tries to exude an extroverted persona. She wears color contacts to aid her self-confidence, and reverts back to her introverted self when not wearing them.
Haruna Amaori (甘織 遥奈, Amaori Haruna)
Voiced by: Mayu Sagara
Renako's younger sister, a more outgoing and cheerful girl who helps Renako clean up her image before starting high school. Haruna generally has a more mature and collected attitude than Renako, and often bluntly criticizes Renako for her shortcomings.
Hitoe Hanatori (花取 単衣, Hanatori Hitoe)
Voiced by: Chiwa Saitō
A housemaid and chauffeur of the Oduka family, employed to look after Mai. Hanatori strongly dislikes Renako, believing that she is a poor choice of partner to Mai and that Satsuki would be preferable as Mai's wife. However, she only lets this on when she and Renako are alone.

== Media ==
=== Light novel ===
Written by Teren Mikami and illustrated by Eku Takeshima, There's No Freaking Way I'll be Your Lover! Unless... began publication under Shueisha's Dash X Bunko imprint. The series has been collected in eight volumes as of September 25, 2025. Two short story collections were released between July and August 2025.

The light novel has been licensed for English release in North America by Seven Seas Entertainment.

No.	Original release date	Original ISBN	English release date	English ISBN
1	February 21, 2020	978-4-08-631356-8	May 30, 2023	978-1-68579-626-6
Prologue; Chapter 1: There's No Freaking Way I'll Be Your Lover!; Chapter 2: There's No Freaking Way We'll Have Our First Kiss!; Chapter 3: There's No Freaking Way We'll Do It Against My Will!; Chapter 4: I Knew There'd Be No Freaking Way, Mai! Unless...; Epilogue
Renako befriends Mai and charms her by accepting her during a moment of emotional weakness. When Mai confesses her love to Renako, Renako is reluctant to accept. The two take turns being friends and lovers, with each trying to convince the other that their preference would be superior. They ultimately decide on being "friends with Rena-fits".
2	August 25, 2020	978-4-08-631379-7	September 5, 2023	978-1-68579-646-4
Prologue; Chapter 1: There's No Freaking Way I'll Be Your Lover! (Satsuki-san Edition); Intermission: Kaho and Mai; Chapter 2: We Have Too Many Secrets! No More! No Freaking Way!; Intermission: Kaho and Satsuki; Chapter 3: Nope! No Matter How Hard I Try, There's No Freaking Way I Can Handle It When Love is War!; Intermission: Kaho and Ajisai; Chapter 4: There's No Freaking Way I'll Beat Mai and Satsuki-san – Unless...; Intermission: Kaho and Renako; Epilogue; Post Epilogue; Intermission: Satsuki and Amaori
After becoming frustrated by Mai's inconsiderate behavior, Satsuki begins acting coldly toward her, causing tension within the friend group. Satsuki strikes a deal with Renako that she will make up with Mai as long as she can date Renako for two weeks. During this period the two become closer and learn more about each other. Eventually Renako, Mai and Satsuki agree to a three-way Esports match with the winner getting to marry Renako. Renako wins and successfully convinces the two to reconcile.
3	April 23, 2021	978-4-08-631412-1	December 5, 2023	978-1-68579-948-9
Prologue; The Sena Ajisaide of the Story: Prologue; Chapter 1: There's No Freaking Way I Can Visit Ajisai-san's House!; The Sena Ajisaide of the Story: Chapter 3; Chapter 2: There's No Freaking Way I Can Take a Vacation Alone with Ajisai-san! Unless...; The Sena Ajisaide of the Story: Chapter 2; Chapter 3: There's No Freaking Way We Can Stay Like This Forever!; The Sena Ajisaide of the Story: Chapter 1; Chapter 4: There's No Freaking Way Summer's Over Already!; The Sena Ajisaide of the Story: Chapter 4; Epilogue; The Sena Ajisaide of the Story: Epilogue
Tired of constantly caring for her two younger brothers, Ajisai decides to run away from home. Renako worries for her safety and decides to accompany her on the trip. The two stay at an inn for a few days as they grow closer and learn more about each other. Mai tracks down where they are staying and joins them. Ajisai realizes at Mai's prompting that she also is in love with Renako. After returning home and making up with her family, Ajisai confesses her feelings to Renako.
4	October 25, 2021	978-4-08-631439-8	May 7, 2024	979-8-88843-443-7
Prologue; Chapter 1: There's No Freaking Way I Can Be Buddy-Buddy with Kaho-chan!; Chapter 2: There's No Freaking Way I Can Do My First Cosplay!; Chapter 3: There's No Freaking Way I Can Do This Performance! Unless...; Minaguchi Kaho's Story; Chapter 4: There's No Freaking Way We Can Stay Like This Forever, Right?; Chapter 5 Preface: Otherwise Known as Mai's Side of the Story; Chapter 6: There's No Freaking Way I'll Be Your Lover! Unless...; Epilogue; Intermission: Satsuki and Amaori 2
Renako realizes that Kaho is actually an introverted girl she once knew in middle school, Kaho Minaguchi, who has also changed her image to become popular in high school. After the two reconnect Kaho reveals that she is a well-known cosplayer online, and she convinces Renako to join her in a cosplay photo shoot. While this goes on Renako also struggles to decide whether to date either Mai or Ajisai, admitting to herself that she likes both of them, but worrying about hurting whoever she doesn't choose. Kaho is invited to participate in a prestigious cosplay event with Renako, and the two help each other overcome performance anxiety. After the performance Renako confesses to both Mai and Ajisai, asking them both to go out with her. They accept, and the three start dating.
5	February 24, 2023	978-4-08-631480-0	September 10, 2024	979-8-88843-873-2
Prologue; Group Chat Name: 5déesses (4) Part 1; Chapter 1: This Was Doomed from the Start! There Was No Freaking Way I Could Do My Best!; Group Chat Name: 5déesses (4) Part 2; Chapter 2: There's No Freaking Way I Can Do Steady Practice!; Group Chat Name: 5déesses (4) Part 3; Chapter 3: Even If I Try My Best, There's Still No Freaking Way Things'll Work Out; Group Chat Name: 5déesses (4) Part 4; Group Chat Name: Behind the 5déesses (3); Chapter 4: There's No Freaking Way I Can Ever Be a People Person!; Group Chat Name: 5déesses (4) Part 5; Epilogue; The Sena Ajisaide of the Story – Season 2; Season 2 – Prologue
The inter-class athletics competition in their school begins, and after a rival group of popular girls from another class called the '5déesses' taunts Renako's friend group, they agree to face off in a basketball match. Renako quickly learns how to play basketball with the help of her sister, Haruna, along with some of her friends and classmates. During the match, Satsuki sprains her ankle and they call in Mai to substitute her. The basketball match ends in a victory for Renako's side, and the rival group congratulates them while apologising for their taunting.
6	November 24, 2023	978-4-08-631528-9	February 11, 2025	979-8-89160-878-8
Prologue; Chapter 1: There's No Freaking Way My Mental Health Can Handle This!; Chapter 2: There's No Freaking Way It's All up to Me! Or Is There?; Group Chat Name: Elvira's Warning (2) Part 1; Chapter 3: There's No Freaking Way I Can Help My Sister!; Chapter 4: There's No Freaking Way I Can Be a Big Sister!; The Amaori Haruna Side of the Story: Season 1; The Koto Satsuki Kronicles: Season 1
One day, Haruna stops going to school, not elaborating why and only saying that she is taking a break from school for two months, while still participating in academic matters from her home. A worried Renako calls on her friends to try and convince Haruna to open up about her problems, all to no avail. Kaho then suggests contacting Seira, one of her cosplay mates who happens to be friends with Haruna, and they agree to meet up. It was there that Seira revealed that Haruna had punched their friend, Minato. Renako meets up with Minato, and upon learning that she was the younger sister of Nashiji Komachi, Renako gets flashbacks to her traumatic past in junior high and hurriedly runs away.
7	December 25, 2024	978-4-08-631568-5	December 23, 2025	979-8-89561-728-1
Chapter 5: The Horrors™ Persist? No Freaking Way!; The Amaori Haruna Side of the Story: Chapter 2; Chapter 6: Recover from This Setback? No Freaking Way!; The Amaori Haruna Side of the Story: Chapter 4; Chapter 7: There's No Freaking Way I Can Win the Sister Squabble of the Century!; The Amaori Haruna Side of the Story: Chapter 5; Chapter 8: There's No Freaking Way I Can Be a Big Sister! (Unless...?); The Amaori Haruna Side of the Story: Chapter 3; Epilogue; The Amaori Haruna Side of the Story: Redux
Despite running away, Renako confronts Haruna back home, only for her to continue refusing to answer, which makes Renako upset. Later on, Renako learns through a press release that Mai now has a fiancée, Lucie Lefebvre. Mai and Renako meet in the rooftop, where Mai explains that the suitor's party she held months ago made her mother upset about Mai's romantic life, and she wrote the press release without Mai's knowledge. Mai then assures a sobbing Renako that she still loves her and that she will never replace her. On the way home, Renako meets Seira and Minato by chance, but their talk was cut short by Renako's sobbing. Haruna learns about this exchange, and she returns to school the next day. Renako then receives an invitation to a reunion of her junior high classmates, and she asks help from her friends to accomplish her goal of showing Nashiji Komachi, the popular girl from junior high who bullied her, how much she has changed. After failing to find her in the party, Renako finds Komachi in her house, where she has become a shut-in after junior high, and finally confronts her.
SS1	July 25, 2025	978-4-08-631610-1	December 8, 2026	979-8-89863-687-6
SS2	August 25, 2025	978-4-08-631613-2	June 8, 2027	979-8-89863-688-3
8	September 25, 2025	978-4-08-631617-0	August 18, 2026	979-8-89765-401-7
Prologue; Chapter 1: I'm Not Mai's Fiancée? No Freaking Way!; Chapter 2: There's No Freaking Way I'll Bomb Queen Rose! (Unless...?); Chapter 3: There's No Freaking Way We Can Be a Throuple! (Unless...?); Chapter 4: Is There Really No Freaking Way It'll Ever Work?; The Koto Satsuki Kronicles: Redux; Epilogue
Mai issues a press release retracting her previous one, and states that she is actually engaged to Satsuki, this leaves Lucie heartbroken and she jokingly suggests to Renako that they should bomb Queen Rose. Later on, as Renako makes her way home from a date with Mai and Ajisai, she is picked up by Satsuki and Hanatori. Hanatori reveals to Renako that Reneé had tasked Terusawa Youko and Satsuki to go undercover as private investigators to sabotage Renako's relationship, she then shows her a dossier detailing her romantic relationships, which falsely concluded that Renako was dating four girls. Ajisai and Renako later agree to meet Satsuki, but on their meet-up, Satsuki runs away, which prompts Renako to chase her. Satsuki confronts Renako and rants about her hatred for romantic relationships. She then gives Renako until Christmas, the time of their engagement ceremony, to stop her from fully pursuing Mai and ending her relationship with Ajisai and Renako. That evening, Renako directly contacts Reneé on her phone, demanding that they have a talk.

=== Manga ===
A manga adaptation illustrated by Musshu was serialized on Shueisha's Dash X Comic section of the Niconico Seiga website from May 15, 2020, to July 31, 2026. The series has been collected in nine tankōbon volumes as of May 19, 2026. A second part illustrated by Eru Kudō, titled There's No Freaking Way I'll be Your Lover! Unless... Second Season, will begin serialization on the same section in Q1 2027.

The manga has also been licensed for English release in North America by Seven Seas Entertainment.

No.	Original release date	Original ISBN	English release date	English ISBN
1	October 16, 2020	978-4-08-891719-1	April 11, 2023	978-1-68579-463-7
Chapters 1–8; Bonus Chapter: When Renako Met Ajisai
2	April 19, 2021	978-4-08-891891-4	June 27, 2023	978-1-68579-590-0
Chapters 9–17; Bonus Content: Four Panel Theater
3	October 19, 2021	978-4-08-892126-6	October 3, 2023	978-1-68579-931-1
Chapters 18–26
4	April 19, 2022	978-4-08-892321-5	February 6, 2024	979-8-88843-400-0
Chapters 27–38; Bonus Content: Chapter 37.5
5	March 17, 2023	978-4-08-892654-4	June 18, 2024	979-8-88843-650-9
Chapters 39–44; Bonus Content: Chapter 42.5; Sena Ajisai's Story: Prologue; Sena Ajisai's Story: Act Three
6	December 19, 2023	978-4-08-893110-4	October 22, 2024	979-8-89160-506-0
Chapters 45–51; Bonus Content: Chapter 45.5; Sena Ajisai's Story: Act Four
7	September 19, 2024	978-4-08-893432-7	June 24, 2025	979-8-89373-323-5
Chapters 52–58; Bonus Content: When Renako Met Ajisai, Pt. 2; Sena Ajisai's Story: Act One
8	June 18, 2025	978-4-08-893790-8	April 28, 2026	979-8-89561-729-8
Chapters 59–63
9	May 19, 2026	978-4-08-894247-6	February 23, 2027	979-8-90209-069-4
Chapters 64–69
10	December 17, 2026	978-4-08-894433-3	—	—

=== Anime ===
An anime television series adaptation was announced on November 19, 2024. It is produced by Studio Mother and directed by Natsumi Uchinuma, with Naruhisa Arakawa handling series composition and scripts, Kojikoji designing the characters, and Yoshiaki Fujisawa composing the music. The series aired from July 8 to September 23, 2025, on Tokyo MX and other networks. (Note: Tokyo MX, SUN and BS11 listed the series premiere on July 7, 2025, at 25:00, which is effectively July 8 at 1:00 a.m. JST.) The opening theme song is "Muri Muri Evolution", performed by Akari Nanawo, while the ending theme song is "Mayocchauwa" (迷っちゃうわ), performed by The Dance for Philosophy. Remow licensed the series for streaming on the It's Anime YouTube channel. (Note: In selected territories for a limited time only.) The series later was added to Amazon Prime Video and Tubi.

On September 23, 2025, after the anime's finale, a sequel was announced. It was first released theatrically on November 21 of the same year under the title There's No Freaking Way I'll Be Your Lover! Unless... ~Next Shine~. The sequel then also aired on television in five episodes on January 1, 2026.

==== Episodes ====
No.	Title (Note: All English titles are taken from Remow's official YouTube uploads of the series.)	Directed by	Storyboarded by	Original release date
1	"Girlfriends? No Freaking Way!"; Transliteration: "Koibito toka, Zettai ni Muri!" (Japanese: 恋人とか、ぜったいにムリ!)	Natsumi Uchinuma	Natsumi Uchinuma	July 8, 2025
Embarrassed by having been a socially anxious loner in middle school, Renako Amaori seeks to rehabilitate her image as she starts high school. She befriends her classmate, popular supermodel Mai Oduka, and joins her clique. However, her social anxiety causes her to panic during lunch one day, and she flees to the school roof. Mai follows Renako and, mistakenly believing she is about to jump, rushes to intervene. Startled, Renako slips and falls. Mai jumps to catch Renako and redirects their fall into a tree, saving her. Renako explains her social anxiety to Mai. In turn, Mai admits that trying to live up to her popularity makes her feel as if no one knows her real self. The two become closer after confiding in one another. The following day, Mai unexpectedly confesses her love to Renako, surprising the latter as she simply wishes to be friends. The two agree to take turns being friends and lovers, with both vying to convince the other that their preferred relationship would be better. On their first date, Mai gives Renako a kiss on the nose, flustering her. As she leaves, Renako vows that she will convince Mai to be friends.
2	"First Kiss?! No Freaking Way!"; Transliteration: "Hajimete no Kisu Nante, Muri!" (Japanese: 初めてのキスなんて、ムリ!)	Yuto Nakamura	Natsumi Uchinuma	July 15, 2025
Renako invites Mai to her house, where they play video games. The next day, Mai visits again and challenges Renako to another game, on the condition that if she wins, Renako will accept one request from her. Mai wins and asks Renako for a hug. The hug surprises Renako, as she realizes the depth of Mai's affections. Later, after school, Mai and Renako write lists expressing what they would like to do as girlfriends and friends, respectively. Mai's list is overtly sexual, which flusters Renako. She invites Mai to a friendship outing, and they visit DiverCity Tokyo Plaza. As they are leaving, it suddenly rains, soaking Mai. Mai takes Renako to a hotel to wait out the rain, where they take a bath together. Renako tells Mai what her ideal friendship looks like, and Mai is surprised, saying that her ideal romance with Renako is similar. Mai advances upon and kisses Renako on the mouth. Fearing she will be seduced into fulfilling Mai's sexual desires, Renako panics. Renako tells Mai that the kiss does not count, as they are currently friends. Mai responds by "friend kissing" Renako again, reaffirming her affections.
3	"You Can't Freaking Force Me!"; Transliteration: "Muriyari Nante, Dame Muri!" (Japanese: ムリヤリなんて、だめムリ!)	Daisuke Inoue	Daisuke Inoue	July 22, 2025
After their kiss, Mai and Renako both find themselves unable to stop thinking about one another, though Renako denies this. While Mai visits Paris for modeling work, Renako goes shopping with Ajisai. Renako feels insecure due to her attraction to Ajisai, but tells herself it does not count as cheating on Mai since they are not officially dating. Ajisai makes plans to come to Renako's house. Later, Mai calls Renako, and Renako tells her about her outing with Ajisai. Mai is upset and jealous, leading to an argument. Mai arrives unannounced to the Amaori house during Ajisai's visit, surprising Renako. Ajisai leaves, and Mai comes onto Renako, pinning her to the floor and removing her shirt. Despite enjoying being touched by Mai, Renako feels conflicted, reasoning that if the situation escalates, they will not be able to remain friends. Aroused, Mai ignores Renako's pleas to stop. The encounter is cut short when Renako's younger sister Haruna walks in. Embarrassed, she immediately leaves. Renako slaps Mai and admonishes her conduct. Downcast, Mai apologizes and departs. Afterwards, Renako regrets not having been more firm in asserting her boundaries, but considers that she may have wanted to go further.
4	"Mai?! No Freaking Way! (...Or maybe?)" Transliteration: "Mai Nante, Yappari Muri Muri! (*Muri Janakatta!?)" (Japanese: 真唯なんて、やっぱりムリムリ!（※ムリじゃなかった!?）)	Kenta Kushitani	Kenta Kushitani	July 29, 2025
The next day, Renako finds that Mai has not come to school. Satsuki calls Renako to the roof, and tells Renako that Mai came to her house and tearfully told the full story. Realizing Mai regrets her actions, Renako resolves to make amends. Ajisai invites Renako to her house. Wanting to accept but unable to, as Mai is a higher priority, Renako enthusiastically tells Ajisai she really likes her and would like to hang out another time, leaving Ajisai flustered. Renako heads to a hotel where Mai is hosting a "suitors' party" to which she has invited everyone who has previously confessed to her, seeking a new partner after having decided to give up on Renako. Renako confronts Mai and admits that she has developed romantic feelings. The two kiss, and Mai cancels the suitors' party. Later, when they are set to decide whether they are friends or lovers, Renako says she is still not certain she wants to be girlfriends, but offers an alternative of "more than friends, less than lovers". Mai accepts, but declares her intent to convince Renako to commit to a proper romantic relationship before their graduation.
5	"Girlfriends? No Freaking Way! (Round 2)"; Transliteration: "Koibito Toka, Zettai ni Muri! Sono ni" (Japanese: 恋人とか、ぜったいにムリ!その2)	Yihan Shu	Takao Kato and Natsumi Uchinuma	August 5, 2025
Since Mai came to Satsuki's house to vent about her relationship with Renako, Satsuki has been irritated at Mai and the two have not spoken to each other, creating a rift within the group. In order to spite Mai, Satsuki asks Renako to date her. Despite Renako's reluctance, she ultimately agrees on the condition that they only date temporarily until Satsuki and Mai reconcile. Satsuki takes Renako to a shrine where she and Mai met as small children, and declares her intent to "defeat" Mai. The two spend some time together, drawing Mai's notice. Mai takes Renako aside privately and assures Renako that as they are not dating proper, she does not need to worry about cheating with Satsuki, as Mai will be satisfied so long as Renako ultimately ends up in a relationship with her. Later, Renako and Mai encounter each other at school, and Satsuki approaches Renako intimately in front of Mai in an attempt to provoke Mai's jealousy, prompting Renako to reflect that she has been caught in the middle of their feud.
6	"Too Many Freaking Secrets!"; Transliteration: "Futari Dake no Himitsu ga Ōsugite, Mō Muri!" (Japanese: ふたりだけのヒミツが多すぎて、もうムリ!)	Koichi Tamura	Natsumi Uchinuma and Takao Kato	August 12, 2025
Satsuki helps Renako study to improve her mediocre grades, and reflects on how she used to struggle academically, until she noticed Mai's academic aptitude and was motivated to improve. That evening, Haruna takes Renako out to get donuts. Satsuki is working at the donut shop and introduces herself as Renako's girlfriend, confusing Haruna, who assumes Renako is cheating on Mai. After Satsuki's shift ends, she takes Renako to her home. There, Renako learns that Satsuki lives in a small apartment with her single mother and that the two both work to support each other, which embarrasses Satsuki. In return, Renako admits her introverted nature, but Satsuki is unsurprised, noting Renako's low self-esteem and anxious attitude. Upset by this, Renako flees the apartment, but is found by Satsuki, who offers to let Renako stay the night. Satsuki bathes with and washes Renako, eager to "even the score" with Mai. Renako is aroused by the encounter, and Satsuki finds this irritating. That night, Satsuki asks Renako for a picture of them kissing to have proof of their relationship to show to Mai. Renako kisses Satsuki on the mouth, flustering Satsuki, who assumed the kiss would be on the cheek.
7	"No Freaking Way I'm Surviving This Mess!"; Transliteration: "Shuraba Toka, dō Agaite mo Muri!" (Japanese: 修羅場とか、どうあがいてもムリ!)	Tomoaki Takatsudo and Yuto Nakamura	Atsushi Otsuki	August 19, 2025
Renako's interactions with Satsuki at school are awkward after their kiss, although Satsuki denies that she feels any affections for Renako. Meanwhile, Ajisai expresses interest in spending more time with Renako, but Renako is unavailable due to her obligations to Satsuki. Ajisai speaks with Renako by phone, and they discuss Mai and Satsuki's feud. Renako expresses that she would like them to make up, prompting Ajisai to encourage Mai to do so. Mai asks Satsuki to clarify what offended her, but Satsuki refuses to do so and instead provokes an argument. Mai deflects by saying she will marry Renako, and Satsuki claims that she and Renako are in a relationship, showing the photo of their kiss as evidence, despite Renako's protests. The argument escalates, and Satsuki and Mai declare that they will battle for Renako's hand in marriage. Renako insists on competing as well, on the condition that if she wins, they will all return to the previous status quo as friends. She stipulates that they will play a match in an FPS game to decide the winner. Later, Satsuki comes over to Renako's house to practice her gaming skills.
8	"A Perfect Win? No Freaking Way!"; Transliteration: "Kanzen Shōri Suru Nante, Muri Muri!" (Japanese: 完全勝利するなんて、ムリムリ!)	Pei-Ni Hong	Junichi Sakata	August 26, 2025
At the FPS match, Mai wins the first of three rounds, while Renako wins the second. Satsuki excuses herself to the restroom, but after she does not return, Renako goes to check on her. Satsuki tells Renako that she is frustrated by thus far not having been able to beat Mai despite putting in all her best efforts, leading Renako to realize that her simply winning the game would not lead to the two of them making up. Renako successfully encourages Satsuki to not give up. During the third round, Satsuki tells the story of how she and Mai became friends as small children, as she let Mai visit her house when Mai, stressed by her obligations to her mother, was reluctant to return home. When Mai's mother came to collect her, Satsuki defended Mai, saying she had not done anything wrong. The recollection distracts Mai long enough for Satsuki to defeat her, satisfying Satsuki's desire for victory, after which Renako wins the match. Later, Mai's group meets up at a diner to celebrate Satsuki's birthday, and Satsuki reveals that she has beaten Mai's test scores. She revels in her victory over Mai with a satisfied smirk.
9	"Visiting Ajisai's House? No Freaking Way!"; Transliteration: "Ajisai-san no Otaku Hōmon Toka, Muri!" (Japanese: 紫陽花さんのお宅訪問とか、ムリ!)	Ayako Sugi	Natsumi Uchinuma	September 2, 2025
Renako visits Ajisai's house. Ajisai talks about her home life, saying she has no time to herself as she cares for her little brothers while her parents work. Ajisai's brothers challenge Renako to play video games with them. After they prolong their playtime despite Ajisai gently urging them to let her have her time with Renako, Ajisai snaps and yells at them, then sends them to their room. Ajisai is embarrassed by her outburst, and the rest of their hangout is awkward. Later, Ajisai calls Renako and declares her intent to run away from home. Fearing for Ajisai's safety, Renako gets up early to intercept her and the two get on a train together. Intensely anxious due to her infatuation with Ajisai, Renako excuses herself and messages Satsuki for advice. Satsuki sends Renako a list of example topics to discuss with Ajisai, but cautions Renako to not put Ajisai on a pedestal, saying that everyone has flaws. They get off the train at a small seaside town, where Ajisai plans to go to an inn she often visits with her family. Noticing Ajisai's insecurity about going somewhere familiar despite desiring an escape, Renako suggests they go to a different inn.
10	"A Trip With Just the Two of Us?! No Way!"; Transliteration: "Futarikkiri no Ryokō Nante, Muri!?" (Japanese: ふたりっきりの旅行なんて、ムリ!?)	Daisuke Inoue	Daisuke Inoue	September 9, 2025
Ajisai proposes that she pay for their stay, as she feels guilty about running away and believes she must shoulder the expense. Renako disagrees, insisting on covering her share. To settle the issue, they play ping-pong. They express their competing conceptions of friendship, with Ajisai feeling she must shoulder their burdens alone to ensure Renako's happiness. Renako refutes this, saying that their happiness should be reciprocal and they should share their problems. Although Ajisai wins the game, she agrees to let Renako pay, but instead asks Renako to join her in the hot springs. While they are washing themselves, Renako offhandedly mentions that she touched Satsuki's breasts in the bath. Ajisai offers to let Renako touch hers as well. Renako does so, and the two are aroused despite their embarrassment. Later they discuss the differences between romance and friendship, with Ajisai noting Renako's idea of friendship is like dating. The next morning, Ajisai asks Renako to roleplay as her older sister, as she is tired of her responsibilities as an older sibling and wants to be a little sister. Renako plays along with Ajisai's fantasy. They are interrupted when Mai arrives, having learned their location from Haruna.
11	"Is There No Way We Can Stay Like This?"; Transliteration: "Itsumademo Kono Mama de Iru no wa, Muri?" (Japanese: いつまでもこのままでいるのは、ムリ?)	Toshiyuki Yahagi; Hiroaki Matsushima	Toshiyuki Yahagi; Natsumi Uchinuma	September 16, 2025
Ajisai, Mai, and Renako go out together, visiting a dagashi shop and getting a group photo taken. They later prepare yukatas for a festival, during which Hanatori privately confronts Renako, expressing animosity to her as she would prefer that Mai marry Satsuki. During the festival, Mai tells Ajisai about her attraction to Renako, asking if Ajisai has similar feelings. Ajisai denies it, not wanting to interfere with Mai's own romantic pursuit. Renako reflects fondly on her time with Ajisai and Mai, and Mai leaves in the morning before Ajisai is awake, having to go to work. When Ajisai and Renako go to wait for their return train back, Renako expresses her gratitude to Ajisai for their friendship. Ajisai, in turn, says she has something she wants to tell Renako, but as she says it, the sound of a passing train drowns out her voice, and Renako does not hear Ajisai's confession. Embarrassed, Ajisai drops the subject. She reflects on the morning she ran away, when she had been planning to turn back and go home once she had reached the station until finding Renako there to greet her. Ajisai realizes that she had, at that moment, fallen in love.
12	"No Freaking Way Summer Break is Over!"; Transliteration: "Natsuyasumi ga mō Owaru! Muri!" (Japanese: 夏休みがもう終わる! ムリ!)	Koichi Tamura	Koichi Tamura; Takao Kato	September 23, 2025
Ajisai returns home with Renako, and the two of them both apologize to their families for having run away. Later, Ajisai visits Renako's house to thank Renako and apologize to her mother. As Ajisai leaves, Renako follows her and walks her to the station. Renako expresses that she often thinks about Ajisai and would like to know if there is any way she can help her feel better. In response, Ajisai begins suddenly crying, and abruptly departs, leaving Renako confused. Renako calls Mai to ask if she might know what trouble Ajisai is having. Mai says she does, but will not tell Renako, as she feels that it is a problem Ajisai must solve on her own. Later, Ajisai is reconnecting with her old middle school classmates, who ask if she has a boyfriend. They encounter Mai working at a photoshoot. Ajisai approaches Mai and admits that she is in love with Renako. Mai takes Ajisai to an aquarium where they discuss their relationships with Renako. Mai tells Ajisai there is nothing wrong with her feelings, and encourages her to confess. Ajisai calls Renako and asks to meet, and confesses, with Mai's support. Surprised, Renako seemingly accepts Ajisai's confession.
13	"Getting along with Kaho-chan? No Freaking Way!"; Transliteration: "Kaho-chan to Nakayoku wa, Muri!?" (Japanese: 香穂ちゃんと仲良くは、ムリ!?)	Kazuhito Omiya	Jun Kamiya	January 1, 2026
Renako tells Ajisai that she needs a month to answer her confession properly, and Ajisai agrees to wait. A week later, Renako is still unable to choose between Mai and Ajisai, not wanting to upset either of them with a rejection while accepting the other. Depressed, she skips school. At home, she finds an old photo of herself and her childhood friend, and realizes that it is Kaho. She returns to school and shows the photo to Kaho. Although Kaho is surprised by Renako's recognition of her, they spend some time socializing before Renako tells Kaho of the situation and asks for advice. Kaho is unsympathetic to Renako's plight, instead being jealous that Renako has received love confessions from two girls, and the two argue and have a fight. Their argument creates a rift in the group, but a few days later, Renako overhears Kaho speaking to Satsuki, who is unwilling to fulfill a favor that Kaho is asking for. Satsuki suggests Kaho ask Renako, and leaves. Kaho hastily asks Renako for forgiveness, and then requests her assistance with the favor that Satsuki abandoned.
14	"First Time Cosplaying and it's A Freaking Disaster?!"; Transliteration: "Hajimete no Kosupure wa Yabai Muri!" (Japanese: 初めてのコスプレはやばいムリ！)	Kenta Kushiya	Kenta Kushiya	January 1, 2026
Kaho tells Renako that she will be paid thirty thousand yen. The large amount of money being offered leads Renako to be suspicious that the task is something illicit, and she flees. Exhausted of dealing with people, Renako starts an intimate moment with her gaming console and sleeps with it, waking up the next day to find that it fell off her bed and stopped working. Later, Satsuki sets up another meeting between Renako and Kaho. Needing the money to fix her gaming console, Renako reluctantly agrees to Kaho's request. Kaho reveals that she is a lesbian and asks Renako if she is also, which Renako denies. The two go to Kaho's house, where it is revealed that the job is a series of cosplay photo shoots. Kaho measures Renako's body for the costume, while complementing Renako's figure, which flusters her. The first cosplay shoot does not go well due to Renako's poor self-esteem. To remedy this, Kaho records numerous salacious ASMR audio files intended to induce hypnosis to boost Renako's confidence. This succeeds, but Renako's more peppy persona proves bothersome to Kaho and the rest of the group. Despite this, the photo shoot goes well, although Renako is embarrassed when the hypnosis wears off. Renako is paid her thirty thousand yen, much to her delight, and Kaho invites her to an after party. For the after party, Kaho takes Renako to a love hotel.
15	"No Freaking Way We're Going on An Amusement Park Date?!"; Transliteration: "Yūenchi Dēto nante, Muri!" (Japanese: 遊園地デートなんて、ムリ！)	Ayako Sugi	Junichi Sakata	January 1, 2026
During their after party, Kaho and Renako confide in one another about their insecurities. The two go to bathe together when Renako discovers that Kaho's extroverted persona disappears upon the latter removing her contacts, as they allow her to feel transformed and confident. Kaho feels conflicted when she is invited to the prestigious Makuhari Cosplay Summit, but is encouraged by Renako to accept. The next day, Renako resolves to return Mai's feelings and meets her on the school rooftop. Mai proposes an amusement park date with Renako and Ajisai, so Renako postpones her talk until then. That Sunday, Renako and Ajisai meet at the amusement park, but Mai informs the latter that she will no longer be attending due to work. The two enjoy their outing at the park and finish with a ferris wheel ride, where Ajisai and Renako nearly share a kiss. Later, Kaho informs Renako she has accepted the invitation to the cosplay summit and invites Renako to perform with her, much to Renako's shock. Meanwhile, a dejected Mai visits Satsuki's apartment, believing that Renako has accepted Ajisai's feelings.
16	"Perform? On A Stage Like That? No Freaking Way!"; Transliteration: "Konna Sutēji, Watashi ni wa Muri!" (Japanese: こんなステージ、わたしにはムリ！)	Hiroaki Matsushima	Hiroaki Matsushima	January 1, 2026
A nervous Renako accepts Kaho's invitation to perform with her at the cosplay summit. Ajisai and Mai head to the rooftop where Ajisai confronts Mai on her reasoning behind missing the amusement park date. Ajisai correctly suspects Mai was lying in order to suppress her feelings and to distance herself on their behalf, which Ajisai tearfully objects to, and proposes the two go on a date together. In the meantime, Kaho and Renako rigorously rehearse for their performance. On the day of the summit, Renako and Kaho encounter Seira, one of Haruna's friends whom Renako previously met, and a cosplay rival to Kaho. They discover that her cosplay partner is no other than Satsuki, and the two become extremely uneasy. Despite Renako wanting to run away, Satsuki openly doubts she can do so. Soon after, one of Kaho's contact lenses is accidentally destroyed by a convention staff member. This causes her to fall into a downward spiral of insecurity and self-hatred, which Renako angrily snaps her out of. After deciding to perform for each other's sake, regardless of the outcome, the two confidently take the stage to perform.
17	"There's No Freaking Way I'll Be Your Lover! (Wait, Actually...!)"; Transliteration: "Watashi ga Koibito ni Nareru Wakenaijan, Muri Muri! (*Muri Janakatta!)" (Japanese: わたしが恋人になれるわけないじゃん、ムリムリ！（※ムリじゃなかった！）)	Natsumi Uchinuma	Natsumi Uchinuma	January 1, 2026
Ajisai joins Mai in modeling for photographs on their date. Once they finish, the two have a conversation about love. Mai laments that she still does not understand what love is and also fears that giving into love will jeopardize her career. Ajisai encourages Mai to pursue her feelings in spite of her anxieties and Mai thanks her for being a good friend. Shortly thereafter, Ajisai encounters Satsuki in the hallway wearing her cosplay outfit. As Renako and Kaho chat after finishing their performance, Satsuki brings Ajisai to meet with them. The four go to see Mai give a speech as the event's special guest. After she finishes, Ajisai calls out to her from the seats and invites Renako to join them on stage as Mai is about to permanently relocate to France. Renako finally confesses her feelings to both Mai and Ajisai and decides to date them both, wanting to abandon her previous objective of remaining an ordinary person. Though the two are initially conflicted about this proposal, they soon accept and tearfully embrace on stage. With their three-way relationship now official, Satsuki texts Renako asking if she could date her as well.

== Reception ==
=== Light novel ===
The novel series ranked third in the Next Light Novel Award 2021, and won first place in the original work category. Sean Gaffney of Manga Bookshelf gave the first light novel a mixed review, saying that although he could "understand the appeal", he was put off by Mai disregarding Renako's lack of consent to her advances and the "very, very panicky teenager" tone of Renako's narration. Gaffney additionally was disinterested in the harem premise of the series, saying he would prefer that the series focus on Renako and Mai's relationship development. He concluded his review by saying, "this isn't bad. It just has a lot of things I personally dislike."

=== Manga ===
The manga adaptation was nominated for the 2021 and 2022 Next Manga Award in the web manga category.

Reviewing the first six volumes of the manga adaptation for Anime News Network, Rebecca Silverman gave it a positive review, praising the art, humor, character arcs, and complexity of the harem romance dynamics. However, she expressed discomfort with Mai's lack of concern for Renako's consent in several scenes, despite acknowledging it was "clearly being done in a spirit of humor". Silverman said that readers looking for a yuri harem story would likely enjoy the series.

=== Anime ===
The first episode of the anime adaptation received mixed responses in ANN's Summer 2025 seasonal previews, with reviewers generally praising the visual presentation and animation, but divided on the premise. Caitlin Moore praised the color palette of the series, calling it "bright in a pleasing way", but was put off by Mai's characterization, describing her as "a creep". Despite this, Moore acknowledged that fans of the source material would almost certainly enjoy the "energetic" anime adaptation. Christopher Farris felt similarly about Mai, saying she was "all but pressuring", but described Renako as a relatable protagonist and expressed interest in further episodes. "Bolts (MrAJCosplay)" expressed similar sentiments, saying that they were "a bit conflicted" on the romance plot, and that they felt the episode abandoned the relatable plot thread of Renako's social anxiety in the second half. James Beckett gave the most positive review, praising the first-person perspective scene showing Renako's social anxiety at the episode's start, and called the story "a cute premise for an adorable show", saying that although it risked portraying Mai as predatory, "she and Renako would make a superstar couple".

The second episode also received a mixed response in ANN. Farris enjoyed the story's exploration of the "blurry lines" between friendship and romantic relationships, but disliked the episode's kissing scene on account of Mai continuing to further push Renako's boundaries. "Bolts (MrAJCosplay)" expressed a similar opinion. James Beckett, in contrast, acknowledged that Mai's behavior would constitute "big red flags" in reality, but opined that this was not an issue "in the universe of a cartoon rom-com".

Vrai Kaiser of Anime Feminist gave the first episode a positive review, praising the "neon edge" of the visual presentation and the premise, but commented that some viewers might not enjoy the fast pace of the series.

== See also ==
- Null & Peta, a media franchise with character designs by Eku Takeshima
- Whisper Me a Love Song, a manga series written and illustrated by Eku Takeshima
- Flower and Asura, a manga series illustrated by Musshu
- Link! Like! Love Live!, a multimedia project that is part of Love Live! franchise, with the main story written by Teren Mikami
