= I'll Become a Villainess Who Goes Down in History =

Japanese light novel series

- I'll Become a Villainess Who Goes Down in History: It Seems Turning into a High-Born Baddie Makes the Prince All the More Lovestruck
- First light novel volume cover

歴史に残る悪女になるぞ 悪役令嬢になるほど王子の溺愛は加速するようです！ (Rekishi ni Nokoru Akujo ni Naru zo: Akuyaku Reijō ni Naru hodo Ōji no Dekiai wa Kasoku suru yō desu!)
- Genre: Isekai
- Novel series
- Written by: Izumi Okido
- Published by: Shōsetsuka ni Narō
- Original run: December 11, 2018 – present
- Light novel
- Written by: Izumi Okido
- Illustrated by: Jyun Hayase
- Published by: Enterbrain
- English publisher: NA: Yen Press
- Imprint: B's Log Bunko
- Original run: August 15, 2019 – present
- Volumes: 9
- Manga
- Written by: Izumi Okido
- Illustrated by: Akari Hoshi
- Published by: Enterbrain
- English publisher: NA: Yen Press
- Magazine: B's Log Comic
- Original run: May 5, 2020 – present
- Volumes: 7
- Anime television series
- Directed by: Yūji Yanase
- Written by: Sawako Hirabayashi
- Music by: Moe Hyūga
- Studio: Maho Film
- Licensed by: Crunchyroll
- Original network: Tokyo MX, BS11, AAB, HTB, Miyatere, RNC, BSN, tys, MBS, AT-X
- English network: SEA: Animax Asia
- Original run: October 2, 2024 – December 25, 2024
- Episodes: 13
- icon

I'll Become a Villainess Who Goes Down in History: It Seems Turning into a High-Born Baddie Makes the Prince All the More Lovestruck (Note: Japanese: 歴史に残る悪女になるぞ 悪役令嬢になるほど王子の溺愛は加速するようです！, Hepburn: Rekishi ni Nokoru Akujo ni Naru zo: Akuyaku Reijō ni Naru hodo Ōji no Dekiai wa Kasoku suru yō desu!) is a Japanese light novel series written by Izumi Okido and illustrated by Jyun Hayase. It began as a web novel published on the user-generated web novel publishing site Shōsetsuka ni Narō in December 2018. It was later acquired by Enterbrain who began publishing it as a light novel under its B's Log Bunko light novel imprint in August 2019. A manga adaptation illustrated by Akari Hoshi began serialization in Enterbrain's B's Log Comic manga website in May 2020. An anime television series adaptation produced by Maho Film aired from October to December 2024.

== Synopsis ==
Instead of trying to avoid her bad ending or become a better person, a young Japanese woman gets reincarnated as Alicia Williams, the primary villainess of her favorite otome dating sim, and is thrilled about it. Having always despised the idealist heroine of the original game, Alicia decides to embrace her destiny.

== Characters ==
Alicia Williams (ウィリアムズ・アリシア, Wiriamuzu Arishia)
Voiced by: Atsumi Tanezaki (drama CD), Kanna Nakamura (anime) (Japanese); Celeste Perez (English)
The protagonist. Having been reborn as a villainess, she strives to be the best she can be in the role, especially once the king hires her to push Liz out of her comfort zone.
Duke Seeker (シーカー・デューク, Shīkā Deyūku)
Voiced by: Yuma Uchida (drama CD), Kaito Ishikawa (anime) (Japanese); Kamen Casey (English)
Prince of the Kingdom. He is in love with Alicia, but is annoyed by Liz and tries to avoid her.
Gill (ジル, Jiru)
Voiced by: Mariya Ise (drama CD), Rie Takahashi (Japanese); Mikaela Krantz (English)
Will (ウィル, Wiru)
Voiced by: Hiroshi Yanaka (Japanese); Aaron Roberts" (English)
Liz Cather (キャザー・リズ, Kyazā Rizu)
Voiced by: Manaka Iwami (Japanese); Rachel Michelle Thompson (English)
The heroine of the game. A sweet-natured but naïve soul, she has a very rosy view of the world.
Albert Williams (ウィリアムズ・アルバート, Wiriamuzu Arubāto)
Voiced by: Ryōta Ōsaka (Japanese); Eduardo Vildasol (English)
Alicia's oldest brother.
Alan Williams (ウィリアムズ・アラン, Wiriamuzu Aran)
Voiced by: Kōhei Amasaki (Japanese); Landon McDonald (English)
Henry Williams (ウィリアムズ・ヘンリ, Wiriamuzu Henri)
Voiced by: Haruki Ishiya (Japanese); Ryan Negron (English)
Eric Hudson (ハドソン・エリック, Hadoson Erikku)
Voiced by: Kent Itō (Japanese); Chase Kloza (English)
Finn Smith (スミス・フィン, Sumisu Fin)
Voiced by: Ayumu Murase (Japanese); Adam Serratos (English)
Gale Evans (エバンズ・ゲイル, Ebanzu Geiru)
Voiced by: Shōya Chiba (Japanese); Brandon Acosta (English)
Curtis Kenwood (ケンウッド・カーティス, Kenuddo Kātis)
Voiced by: Nobuhiko Okamoto (Japanese); Van Barr Jr. (English)
Arnold Williams (ウィリアムズ・アーノルド, Wiriamuzu Ānorudo)
Voiced by: Kazuyuki Okitsu (Japanese); Anthony Bowling (English)
Luke Seeker (シーカー・ルーク, Shīkā Rūku)
Voiced by: Takehito Koyasu (Japanese); Christopher Sabat (English)

== Media ==
=== Light novel ===
Written by Izumi Okido, Rekishi ni Nokoru Akujo ni Naru zo began serialization as a web novel on the user-generated web novel publishing site Shōsetsuka ni Narō in December 2018. It was then acquired by Enterbrain who began publishing it as a light novel under its B's Log Bunko light novel imprint with illustrations by Jyun Hayase on August 15, 2019. As of January 2026, nine volumes have been released. The light novel is licensed in North America by Yen Press.

No.	Original release date	Original ISBN	English release date	English ISBN
1	August 15, 2019	978-4-04-735695-5	February 18, 2025	979-8-8554-0711-2
1. "Alicia, Eldest Daughter of the Williams Family—Ages 7, 8, 10, and 13"; 2. "Albert, Eldest Son of the Williams Family—Age 13"; 3. "Curtis, Eldest Son of the Kenwood Family—Age 15"; 4. "Arnold, Father of the Williams Family—Age 36"; 5. "Gill—Age 9"; 6. "Duke, Eldest Son of the Seeker Family—Age 18"
2	February 15, 2021	978-4-04-736502-5	June 10, 2025	979-8-8554-0713-6
1. "Arnold, Father of the Williams Family—Age 40"; 2. "Gill—Age 11"; 3. "Alicia, Eldest Daughter of the Williams Family—Age 15"; 4. "Duke, Eldest Son of the Seeker Family—Age 20"; 5. "Gill's Reminiscence (Alicia—Age 13, Gill—Age 9)"; 6. "Curtis, Eldest Son of the Kenwood Family—Age 20"
3	September 15, 2021	978-4-04-736754-8	January 27, 2026	979-8-8554-0715-0
1. "Alicia, Eldest Daughter of the Williams Family—Ages 15, 16"; 2. "Gill—Age 11"; 3. "Duke, Eldest Son of the Seeker Family—Age 20"
4	September 15, 2022	978-4-04-737163-7	July 14, 2026	979-8-8554-0717-4
1. "Gill—Ages 11, 12"; 2. "Alicia, Eldest Daughter of the Williams Family—Age 16"
5	August 12, 2023	978-4-04-737605-2	November 10, 2026	979-8-8554-0719-8
1. "Gill—Age 12"; 2. "Alicia, Eldest Daughter of the Williams Family—Age 16"; 3. "Victor, Secondborn Prince of Laval—Age 19"; 4. "Leon, the Assassin—Age 14"; 5. "Liz Cather—Age 20"; 6. "Curtis, Eldest Son of the Kenwood Family—Age 20"
6	March 15, 2024	978-4-04-737855-1	—	—
7	October 15, 2024	978-4-04-738137-7	—	—
8	July 15, 2025	978-4-04-738525-2	—	—
9	January 15, 2026	978-4-04-738761-4	—	—

=== Manga ===
A manga adaptation illustrated by Akari Hoshi began serialization on Enterbrain's B's Log Comic manga website on May 5, 2020. It has been collected in seven volumes as of April 2026. The manga adaptation is also licensed in North America by Yen Press.

No.	Original release date	Original ISBN	English release date	English ISBN
1	December 28, 2020	978-4-04-736447-9	October 15, 2024	978-1-9753-9726-5
Chapters 1–6; Bonus: "When the Ice Melts"
2	October 1, 2021	978-4-04-736791-3	March 25, 2025	978-1-9753-9728-9
Chapters 7–10; Bonus: "The Uglier, the More Beloved"
3	September 1, 2022	978-4-04-737150-7	August 26, 2025	978-1-9753-9730-2
Chapters 11–15; Bonus: "That I May Stand By Her Side"
4	August 12, 2023	978-4-04-737586-4	March 24, 2026	979-8-8554-0879-9
Chapters 16–20; Bonus: "Bystander's Game"
5	September 30, 2024	978-4-04-738168-1	March 23, 2027	979-8-8554-2614-4
6	August 1, 2025	978-4-04-738530-6	—	—
7	April 1, 2026	978-4-04-500030-0	—	—

=== Anime ===
An anime television series adaptation was announced on August 9, 2023. It is produced by Maho Film and is directed by Yūji Yanase, with Sawako Hirabayashi handling series scripts, Yūko Watabe and Eri Kojima designing the characters, and Moe Hyūga composing the music. The series aired on October 2 to December 25, 2024, on Tokyo MX and other networks. (Note: Tokyo MX and BS11 lists the series premiere on October 1, 2024 at 24:30, which is effectively October 2 at 12:30 a.m. JST.) The opening theme song is "Baddududu" (バッドゥドゥドゥ), performed by Liyuu, while the ending theme song is "Wacchu Ane?" (わっちゅあね？; What's Your Name?), performed by Rin Kurusu. Crunchyroll streamed the series.

==== Episodes ====
No.	Title	Directed by	Written by	Storyboarded by	Original release date
1	"The Villainess and Working Out"; Transliteration: "Akujo to Kintore" (Japanese: 悪女と筋トレ)	Yūji Yanase	Sawako Hirabayashi	Yūji Yanase	October 2, 2024
A girl wakes up in the body of Alicia Williams, a villainess character from an otome game series. Alicia decides that from the age of seven, she will train and focus on becoming the greatest villainess ever. Unintentionally, however, she ends up charming most of the love interests in the game's plotline early on through her maturity. She then spends a few years practicing swordsmanship and reading books. Alicia manages to also impress the king with her unique insights on diplomacy. The nobility discover that the gold rose has bloomed, signaling that the saint is born.
2	"A Kiss With a Witch"; Transliteration: "Akujo to Kuchizuke" (Japanese: 悪女と口づけ)	Yūji Yanase	Sawako Hirabayashi	Yūji Yanase	October 9, 2024
Alicia spends time visiting Roana, a village of exiled criminals at night. One day, after fuming over her father's decision to not let her participate in a swordsmanship exam, Alicia heads to Roana, where she inadvertently witnesses a child being beaten near to death. Feeling powerless, she realizes that she is inferior to the story's heroine who would have saved the child. Determined not to give up, she talks to her confidant in the village, Will, and tells him she will take every step to help. After obtaining medicinal herbs, she and Will save the young boy's life. Later on, Alicia discovers hidden tomes in her family library and learns magic. Due to overusing magic, she ends up weakened. The king visits her and asks her for her unique insight again. After she tells him that she hates the kingdom due to its rigid aristocracy, she collapses. The prince Duke carries her to bed and helps her consume her medicine by kissing her while placing the medicine in his mouth.
3	"The Villainess and Trespassing"; Transliteration: "Akujo to Fuhōshin'nyū" (Japanese: 悪女と不法侵入)	Yūji Yanase	Sawako Hirabayashi	Yūji Yanase	October 16, 2024
Alicia recovers from her illness caused by mana depletion. She recalls Duke kissing her but writes it off as an emergency procedure, instead of a romantic gesture. Leaving the kiss aside, she heads towards the magic academy to spy on the heroine. Alicia quickly runs into Liz Cather, the commoner heroine of the game the world is based on. Liz escorts Alicia around, but Alicia leaves while Liz is distracted and explores the school. Back at home, Alicia meets the other nobles and demonstrates magic in front of them. The other nobility are terrified upon recognizing that Alicia is a divergent. Liz comforts Alicia and tells her that everything will be fine. Later on in Roana, Will explains that exceptionally talented mages are known to be divergent. He tells her that divergent mages have a history of bringing disaster to themselves. The child Alicia saved, Gill has awaken and reveals that he is scared of Alicia. In a roundabout manner, Alicia threatens Gill into becoming her retainer and finding a reason to live. The adults back at the manor learn that Alicia is a divergent and put her under strict training for the next three years. After three years, Alicia enrolls in the magic academy, and the king gives her a special condition: she is to be Liz Cather's overseer.
4	"The Villainess and the Flower Field"; Transliteration: "Akujo to Ohanabatake" (Japanese: 悪女とお花畑)	Naoyoshi Kusaka	Yuki Tanihara	Takeshi Mori	October 23, 2024
Alicia accepts her role as Liz Cather's overseer. The king explains that Liz is unrealistic and naive, and Alicia's role is to help make her a more pragmatic saint. Alicia gives the king her own condition: she would like to take Gill to the Academy and remove him from Roana. While retrieving Gill, Alicia runs into a badly injured woman. Alicia manages to save the woman's life but has to amputate her leg. Afterwards, Alicia asks the girl, named Rebecca, to become her informant on Roana. Gill and Alicia finally go to the magic academy, where Alicia quickly runs into Liz. Liz and her friends try to befriend Alicia, but she intentionally dissuades them by acting mean, all to further her image as a villainess. Prince Duke teleports Alicia and has a talk with her as well, as he is excited that she has enrolled. Later on, Alicia interrupts Liz's tea party and berates her naivety on integrating Roana with the rest of the kingdom, earning her the ire of Liz's supporters and cementing her role as the villainess.
5	"The Villainess and The Villainess Test"; Transliteration: "Akujo to Akuyaku Reijou Shiken" (Japanese: 悪女と悪役令嬢試験)	Kyо̄hei О̄yabu	Sawako Hirabayashi	Kyо̄hei О̄yabu	October 30, 2024
Alicia is the center of attention as all students turn on her for "bullying" Liz Cather. At Roana, Rebecca reports to Alicia that there is a strong negative sentiment among the villagers towards outsiders. Rebecca does, however, acknowledge that the villagers are slowly warming up to the idea of turning their lives around. At home, Alicia's older brother, Henri, confides to her that he believes she was correct in her debate against Liz and he cannot understand why everyone around Liz automatically sides with her. After confiding, Henri hands her an invite to the King's tea party. At the tea party, Alicia undermines Liz's point of view until Liz manages to figure out a passable solution to a neighboring country's economic woes. Duke escorts Alicia out of the castle after the tea party and spends some time talking to her. On a carriage ride with Henri and Gill, Alicia realizes that Liz might be using magic to subtly brainwash people onto her side. However, before Alicia can investigate, she and Gill are ambushed and kidnapped.
6	"The Villainess and Sleeping Side by Side"; Transliteration: "Akujo to Soine" (Japanese: 悪女と添い寝)	Naoyoshi Kusaka	Kunihiko Okada	Takeshi Mori	November 6, 2024
Alicia wakes up after being kidnapped and realizes that she has been restrained not just physically, as a magic-cancelling collar has also been placed on her. One of the kidnappers determines that Gill is worthless to ransom and considers killing him. After hearing this, Alicia, in a fit of rage, easily dispatches the kidnappers despite being tied up. One of the kidnappers flees, and Alicia chases him down. Right before she incapacitates him, Liz shows up and uses restraining magic on Alicia. Due to this, Alicia is almost killed by the kidnapper, however Duke intervenes in time to save her. Liz blames Alicia for acting in self defense, even when Alicia tells her she was about to be killed. Enraged at her, Duke tells Liz she is unfit to be called the saint and nearly freezes her. However, another student intervenes and calms the situation down. Afterwards, Duke takes Alicia to the infirmary and she later wakes up to him sleeping next to her. He helps Alicia put on her necklace and is about to kiss her, but they get interrupted by Gill. Alicia and her friends discuss the incident and narrow down the responsible party, while Gill resolves to become stronger to prevent harm from coming Alicia's way in the future. They also learn that the king allowed the kidnapping to occur. The king did this to further train the saint by giving her a challenging mission, even though it risked the lives of Gill and Alicia. Later on, due to the incident, Alicia's father orders Alicia to stop being Liz's watcher due to the danger it poses. Alicia refuses and promises that she will achieve level 90 magic if necessary in order to keep her role.
7	"The Villainess Sits This One Out"; Transliteration: "Akujo wa Ikkai Yasumi" (Japanese: 悪女は一回休み)	Yūji Yanase	Sawako Hirabayashi	Yūji Yanase	November 13, 2024
Alicia secludes herself to undergo intense training in order to reach level 90. Gill also focuses on self-improvement in his own way. Alicia's father speaks to Gill, explaining that he truly does not want her to reach level 90 for her own good, yet he acknowledges that he cannot shield her from her ambitions forever. In the village of Roana, a thief attempts to steal the potato crops that were harvested. However, Nate, the village's strongest fighter, stops the thief. Nate expresses his distrust of Alicia but admits that she might be the only one capable of improving their situation. The king and prince discuss Roana's future and the best ways to govern the country. They also recognize Alicia's exceptional talent, agreeing it would be a waste for her not to become a leading figure in the country. Six months pass, and Alicia continues her training. At the academy, the prince, Henry, and another student discuss why everyone despises Alicia and where the rumors about her originate. The prince, suspecting Liz of potentially mind-controlling the student body, sends Mel on a mission to investigate her. After two years of seclusion, Alicia completes her training and emerges as a high level mage.
8	"The Villainess and the Return"; Transliteration: "Akujo to Dai Fukkatsu" (Japanese: 悪女と大復活)	Masashi Abe	Shunma Hara	Takeshi Mori	November 20, 2024
Alicia demonstrates significant growth during her two-year seclusion, leaving Gill speechless when he finally meets her again. Alicia heads over to Roana right away, taking Gill with her. On arriving in the town, Alicia is surprised at the progress in terms of development and safety Roana has achieved in the time she was gone. After fighting the town's strongest warrior and beating him, she talks to Will. They have a short discussion and then Alicia inserts her eye into Will, allowing him to see again. While Will tries to discourage her, she says one of the main reasons she learned level 91 magic was to use this spell, and he relents. Afterwards, Alicia heads home and updates her father on her current level along with why she was missing an eye. Her father remarks that she will always be his daughter, and he wants to protect her but accepts her personality and lets her enroll in the magic academy. On her return to the academy, Alicia dresses in black and makes a grand entrance, drawing everyone's attention. Alicia runs into one of Liz's supporters, Jane, and humiliates her in front of the crowd. Liz shows up and they have a short talk; Alicia works hard to make sure everyone sees her as the villainess. After Alicia finishes her enrollment, the prince appears and sternly talks to her about the loss of her eye. Alicia rebuffs the prince, unintentionally hurting his feelings. A girl watches from afar and remarks that Alicia is a clumsy villainess.
9	"The Villainess and the Dramatic Chin Lift"; Transliteration: "Akujo to Agokui" (Japanese: 悪女と顎クイ)	Nobutaka Chikahashi	Yuki Tanihata	Kyо̄hei О̄yabu	November 27, 2024
Alicia enters her first class, due to her studying in advance, she is enrolled in upper-level classes with the older students. Liz approaches Alicia to try and make amends, but Alicia continues to rebuff her attempts. Later at lunch, Alicia apologizes to the prince for hurting his feelings but insists that his approach in observing her was incorrect. She explains to the prince that the proper way to protect someone is to be upfront. Liz is upset by the prince showing signs of affection towards Alicia and subconsciously appears to emit a negative magical aura. A girl approaches Alicia and discreetly records their conversation. After Alicia is called to one of Liz's tea parties, Jane presents a doctored recording that makes it look like Alicia was bullying the student, Marika, who approached her. Everyone turns on Alicia, which leaves her excited that her villainess status is going up. A student stands up for Alicia, surprising her, and Mel appears with a true recording of the event. With the reveal, Marika turns on Jane and says she was coerced into making the doctored recording, leaving Jane to be once again humiliated. Liz apologizes on behalf of Marika and Jane. Mel and Alicia leave and discuss why Mel intervened and how Mel knows Alicia. The prince appears and tells Alicia that Mel works for him and that he sent Mel to spy on Alicia. Later, Alicia heads to Roana with Gill and learns the shocking truth about Will: he is the king's older brother.
10	"The Villainess and the Past"; Transliteration: "Akujo to Kako" (Japanese: 悪女と過去)	Hideki Hiroshima	Kunihiko Okada	Takeshi Mori	December 4, 2024
Will Seeker explains that he was banished to Roana after being framed for conspiring against the king. He also tells Alicia that he was supposed to be the king, but due to an accident, he was unable to take the throne. When Will had reached level 80 magic at the age of 10, he became arrogant and attempted maximum level magic. Due to his attempt, he injured himself and lost the ability to use magic; in turn, he also became ineligible for the position of king. As such, his brother Luke assumed the throne. Luke's mother had framed Will due to her overprotectiveness and never told Luke what happened to Will. Alicia bids Will farewell for the time being, and they resolve to eventually have him meet the king. Back at the Academy, a few girls approach Alicia to complain about Liz, but Alicia shrugs them off and says they should talk to Liz directly. Later on, the girls tell Liz that Alicia insulted Liz and start a scene. Finn reveals to Liz that the three girls were trying to set up Alicia and that the three girls were the ones who insulted Liz. Alicia and the others take their leave, declaring the debate a waste of time. Liz, upset at her inability to get along with Alicia yet again, continues to emit a negative aura that influences people, including the three girls. The prince, Gill, Alicia, and Henry have tea and discuss a piece of information they learned during the earlier commotion. After tea, Duke warns Alicia not to get involved with Will and tries to make a move on Alicia, but she rebuffs him, warning him she won't let anyone take her freedom, which impresses Duke.
11	"The Villainess and the School Idol"; Transliteration: "Akujo to Gakuen Charisma" (Japanese: 悪女と学園カリスマ)	Yūji Yanase	Yuki Tanihata	Takeshi Mori	December 11, 2024
Gill and Alicia spend time at school, attending lectures and studying. Liz Cather observes Duke flirting with Alicia and her malice continues to grow. Duke, Gill, and Alicia discuss how to mitigate the spread of "Dotten Sickness", an illness that is spreading through the water. Liz approaches Gill later on and asks him to teach her about Roana. Gill rebuffs Liz at first, but Liz subconsciously releases her mind control aura and influences him, leading him to waver. Duke arrives and breaks the brainwashing placed on Gill. Liz is upset by Duke's intervention, and her malice grows stronger, inadvertently leading to an altercation at the cafeteria. Jane forcibly cuts Carol's hair and then illogically blames Alicia for her own actions. Jane attempts to stab Carol with the scissors, but Alicia restrains Jane with magic and then disarms her. Alicia then proceeds to cut her own hair to mimic Carol's appearance in solidarity. Many girls are surprisingly inspired by Alicia's action and also cut their own hair short to match, indicating that Liz's mind control is weakening. Alicia finds it surprising that people's opinions shifted so easily and considers investigating it. Before she can, she finds that students are now bullying Jane in place of Alicia. Feeling generous, Alicia helps Jane out, but Jane tells her to mind her own business. Alica advises her to feel her own frustration before leaving Jane to cry in private. While researching ancient texts, Mel makes a startling discovery.
12	"The Villainess and the Saint"; Transliteration: "Akujo to Seijo" (Japanese: 悪女と聖女)	Fumio Maezono	Sawako Hirabayashi	Tomohiko Ōkubo	December 18, 2024
Mel approaches the group and tells them that she found out the saint's secret. The saint has a special charm ability that only they can use. Duke deduces that Liz is subconsciously using Charm, and only those with strong mana or willpower are resistant. They further deduce that Liz is slowly spiraling out of control, which Alicia uses to explain why Liz's followers have gotten so unhinged. Gill deduces that Liz is jealous of Alicia and Duke flirting in her presence. Alicia heads to confront Liz, but Liz's supporters get in her way. After her supporters leave, the team weighs their options. Gill points out that leaving Liz in her current state is dangerous and that she needs to be trained on controlling her charm ability before she graduates. Duke decides that he will use Liz's infatuation with him as a shield and try to tackle the issue directly. After convincing Liz to leave her supporters behind, Duke teleports Liz into a room with Alicia, who explains the charm spell to Liz. Liz realizes that the charm effect might be legitimate, but she rationalizes her actions the best she can and confesses her love to Duke. However, Duke rebuffs Liz's advance and tells her plainly that he loves Alicia. Liz breaks down and snaps at everyone, after which Mel reveals that she was cloaking Liz's closest noble supporters and they all witnessed her true self. After having their illusions shattered, everyone realizes that Liz was using charm magic. Alicia tells Liz that she should stop trying to act like the ideal saint and instead live true to herself. Afterwards, Liz grabs the book Mel brought and takes her leave, telling everyone that she will learn how to properly use her powers. At night, Duke brings Will to his father, the king, in order to reunite them. Alicia explains that if Will is proven not guilty, then there will be no remaining civilians in Roana with criminal records and the village will be allowed to reintegrate with the rest of the country. With everything appearing to be resolved, Alicia intends to abdicate her position as Liz's watcher. Duke asks Alicia when she will respond to his confession. The next day, Alicia is pondering her response and comes across Duke, who has seemingly forgotten about her.
13	"The Villainess and the Prince"; Transliteration: "Akujo to Oji" (Japanese: 悪女と王子)	Yūji Yanase	Sawako Hirabayashi	Yūji Yanase	December 25, 2024
Duke questions Gill on who Alicia is leaving them shocked. The various noble children have tea together and discuss what might have caused Duke's sudden amnesia. Alicia is summoned to the castle for a trial after Duke questions whether someone tampered with his memories or with the memories of others. While the trial begins, Alicia realizes that she actually wants to be found guilty and exiled, as this would let her further explore the world. Mel testifies against Alicia during the trial and claims only a high-ranking dark magic user like her could tamper with memories. Alicia intentionally throws the trial so that she can be exiled. After Alicia is found guilty, news of her exile spreads throughout the country. The friends and colleagues of Alicia and Liz all discuss their absences. Liz approaches Alicia at her home and asks why Alicia let herself walk into such a trap. It is revealed that Duke faked his memory loss so that Alicia could have her freedom and leave the country and go to Laval. As she prepares to leave, Alicia leaves Gill a letter to deliver to Duke and tell him that she is not interested in a relationship. Duke liberates Roana by breaking down the barrier, and the exiled village is fully reunited with the country. While on the road out of the country, Alicia is intercepted by Duke, who breaks into her carriage and kisses her passionately. The two agree to meet again one day, and Alicia realizes that she will fall for Duke again. Alicia's mother reveals that the black rose had bloomed for Alicia when she was seven; the rose signified that she would bring great change to the country. After telling the prince to wait for her, Alicia reaches Laval.

== Reception ==
The series as a whole had over 850,000 copies in circulation by August 2023.
