= Teren Mikami =

Japanese light novelist

- Born: Sendai, Miyagi Prefecture, Japan
- Occupations: Novelist, manga author
- Writing career
- Language: Japanese
- Period: 2014–present
- Genre: Yuri
- Notable works: There's No Freaking Way I'll Be Your Lover! Unless...; A Yuri Story About a Girl Who Insists Two Girls Can't Be Together, But Is Thoroughly Seduced in 100 Days; If You Could See Love
- Teren Mikami on X

Teren Mikami (みかみてれん, Mikami Teren) is a Japanese novelist and manga writer. They are known for writing yuri light novels and manga, including There's No Freaking Way I'll Be Your Lover! Unless..., A Yuri Story About a Girl Who Insists Two Girls Can't Be Together, But Is Thoroughly Seduced in 100 Days, and If You Could See Love.

== Career ==
Mikami has written various light novels, manga, and stories for video games and anime during their career. Their works focus on yuri romance, high school girls, popularity, and social isolation, with comedic, social elements and harem elements, and occasional mystery and suspense elements in certain works. In an interview in February 2020, about their work, they said loved writing, and reading, citing Marimite as a major influence on their interest in yuri, noting they read every novel available in the local library. They also told the interviewer about what they perceived as different kinds of yuri focusing on students, adults, or with violence, and said they wrote "heroic tales" about boys and girls, and "commercial girls' romantic comedies" with wide appeal.

In 2014, Mikami debuted as an author, and began writing in the fantasy genre, followed by writing yuri doujinshi works and fan fiction, and was a "wannabe light novelist" as they put it in an interview years later.

In 2018, Mikami began self-publishing the light novel "A Yuri Story About a Girl Who Insists Two Girls Can't Be Together, But Is Thoroughly Seduced in 100 Days", which they co-wrote with Yukiko and Wata, in a digital format. It received a manga adaptation in 2020, which began on Square Enix's Manga Up! site, and ran until 2022.

In February 2020, Mikami began publishing two light novels: There's No Freaking Way I'll be Your Lover! Unless... and If You Could See Love, both under the Dash X Bunko label, run by Shueisha, and tapping Eku Takushima as illustrator. Both light novels received serialized manga adaptations by Musshu, launching in May 2020 on the website of Nico Nico Seiga. Yen Press would later publish a digital version of the If You Could See Love manga adaptation, while Kadokawa published book volumes compiling the manga, and on the publisher's Shōnen Ace Plus website from 2020 to 2022.

Mikami wrote the main story for Link! Like! Love Live!, a mobile game of the Hasunosora Girls' High School Idol Club, a multimedia project and part of the Love Live! franchise, that launched in April 2023. It was later adapted into three manga, entitled Link! Life! Love Live!, Love Live! Flowers: Hasunosora Girls' School Idol Club, and Link! Like! Love Live! @comic, and a May 2026 anime film, entitled Love Live! Hasunosora Girls' High School Idol Club Bloom Garden Party, written by Fumiaki Maruto.

From 2023 to 2024, Black Black Lotus, a manga which Mikami co-wrote with Ogishiro, was serialized. It was later published in Kadokawa's BookWalker platform beginning in June 2024.

In September 2024, it was announced that Mikami was the scriptwriter on the anime adaptation of a popular murder mystery party board game, entitled Murder Mystery of the Dead. The series aired from November 16 to December 26, 2024.

In November 2024, it was announced that Mikami's story There's No Freaking Way I'll be Your Lover! Unless... had received an anime adaptation, which debuted on July 7, 2025. It received a theatrical sequel entitled There's No Freaking Way I'll Be Your Lover! Unless... ~Next Shine~, which ran in Japanese theaters from November 21 to December 5, 2025. It then aired on Japanese television, broken into five episodes, and streamed beginning in January 2026.

In January 2025, Mikami's manga, Girls x Vampire, which they co-wrote with Minori Chigusa, began its serialization in Champion Buzz.

== Works ==
=== Light novels ===
- There's No Freaking Way I'll be Your Lover! Unless... (with Eku Takeshima; 2020–present)
- A Yuri Story About a Girl Who Insists Two Girls Can't Be Together, But Is Thoroughly Seduced in 100 Days (also known as Onna Dōshi toka Arienai Desho to Iiharu Onna no Ko o, 100-kakan de Tetteiteki ni Otosu Yuri no Ohanashi, with Yukiko and Wata; 2018–2022)

=== Manga ===
- Girls x Vampire (with Minori Chigusa; 2025-)
- Black Black Lotus (ブラック・ブラック・ロータス) (with Ogishiro; 2023–2024)
- If You Can See Love (with Yūki Nanaji (art); 2020–2022)

=== Anime ===
- Murder Mystery of the Dead (2024)

=== Video games ===
- Link! Like! Love Live! (2023, main story)
