= Rin Kurusu =

Rin Kurusu 来栖 りん
- Born: November 8, 2000 (age 25); Tokyo, Japan
- Occupations: Idol, tarento, singer, voice actress
- Years active: 2017–present
- Label: Lantis
- Formerly of: 26-ji no Masquerade
- Website: kurusurin.jp

Rin Kurusu (来栖 りん, Kurusu Rin; born November 8, 2000) is a Japanese singer, tarento, and voice actress from Tokyo who is affiliated with YORIDOCORO. She made her debut as a member of the idol group 26-ji no Masquerade, which was active from 2017 to 2022. After the group's disbandment, Kurusu launched a solo career, performing theme songs for anime series such as KamiKatsu, That Time I Got Reincarnated as a Slime, and I'll Become a Villainess Who Goes Down in History. She is also active as a voice actress, voicing the character Hime Anyōji in the Love Live! franchise.

== Biography ==
Kurusu was born in Tokyo on November 8, 2000. From an early age, she was an anime fan, having been influenced by trips to video stores with her mother. She liked series such as Hayate the Combat Butler!, Lucky Star, Monogatari, and The World God Only Knows. She also admired idols and musicians, particularly Reona Matsushita of the idol group Maneki Kecak.

When she was in junior high school, Kurusu was scouted by a talent agency during her trips to Harajuku; while she initially hesitated joining, she eventually accepted the offer upon her father's urging. When she was in high school, she participated in an audition for a new idol group, 26-ji no Masquerade. She passed the audition and became one of its founding members from its debut in 2017; she would ultimately remain a member until it disbanded in 2022.

Kurusu released her first photo book 16-Sai no Koakuma in July 2017. In 2018, she won the grand prize at that year's iteration of Seikore 18, an audition held by Shueisha's Weekly Young Jump magazine. She was also featured in the second photo book of model and actress Nashiko Momotsuki in 2022.

After 26-ji no Masquerade disbanded on October 30, 2022, Kurusu announced she would be launching a solo career under the record label Lantis, becoming a singer and voice actress. Although she had considered becoming a voice actress earlier in life, her activities as an idol initially prevented her from pursuing that career. Because of her lack of training, she found it difficult to transition at first, and has since spent the following years practicing her skills.

Kurusu's first single, "I Wish", was released on May 24, 2023. The title song is used as the opening theme to the anime television series KamiKatsu; the series also marked her debut as a voice actress, with her voicing the character Cyan. She released the mini-album Happy Lucky Diary on September 27, 2023. Her second single "Believer" was released on May 22, 2024, with the title song being used as the first ending theme to the third season of the anime series That Time I Got Reincarnated as a Slime. That year, she also began voicing the character Hime Anyōji in the mobile game Link! Like! Love Live!. Her third single "What's your name?" was released on November 27, 2024, with the title song being used as the ending theme to the anime series I'll Become a Villainess Who Goes Down in History. She will release her first album This is Rin on March 18, 2026. She is set to reprise her role as Hime Anyōji in the 2026 film Love Live! Hasu no Sora Jogakuin School Idol Club Bloom Garden Party.

== Discography ==
=== Singles ===
- "I Wish" (May 24, 2023)
- "Believer" (May 22, 2024)
- "What's your name?" (わっちゅあね?, Wattchuane?) (November 27, 2024)

=== Mini-albums ===
- Happy Lucky Diary (September 27, 2023)

=== Albums ===
- This is Rin (March 18, 2026)

== Filmography ==
=== Anime ===
- KamiKatsu (2023), Cyan
- Love Live! Hasu no Sora Jogakuin School Idol Club Bloom Garden Party (2026), Hime Anyōji

=== Video games ===
- Link! Like! Love Live! (2024), Hime Anyōji
