= Shuka Saitō =

Japanese voice actress

- 斉藤 朱夏
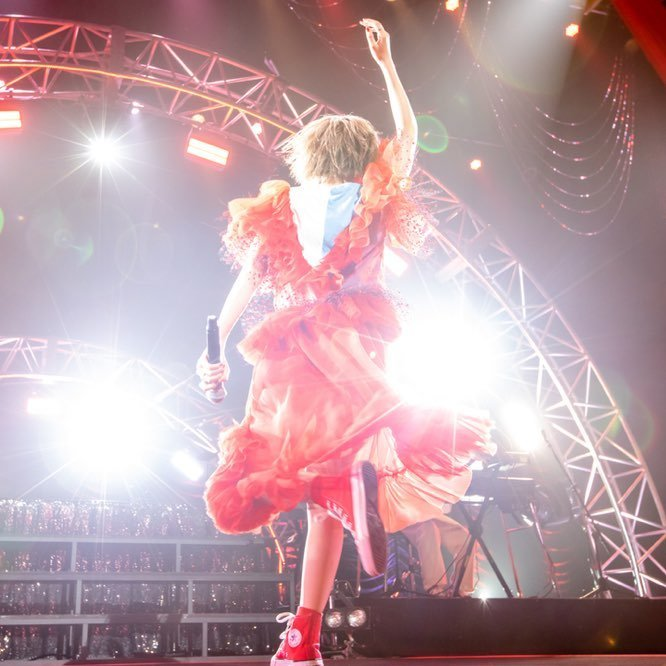
- Saitō performing at in 2021
- Born: August 16, 1996 (age 30); Saitama Prefecture, Japan
- Occupations: Voice actress; singer
- Years active: 2015–present
- Agent: YORIDOCORO
- Notable credit: Love Live! Sunshine!! as You Watanabe
- Height: 151 cm (4 ft 11 in)
- Musical career
- Genres: J-Pop; Anison
- Instrument: Vocals
- Years active: 2019–present
- Label: Sacra Music (2019–2025) MONSTER BUILDING (2026–present)
- Website: atashi-shuka.bitfan.id

Shuka Saitō (斉藤 朱夏, Saitō Shuka; born August 16, 1996) is a Japanese voice actress and singer. She is currently affiliated with YORIDOCORO. She is known for her role as You Watanabe in the multimedia franchise Love Live! Sunshine!!. She is also an idol in the unit Aqours, for the same franchise. In 2019, she made her solo debut as a musician under Sacra Music with the mini album "Kutsuhimo" (くつひも, Kutsuhimo). Later that year, she released the single "36°C/Papapa" (36°C/パパパ); the song "Papapa" was used as the opening theme to the anime series Oresuki.

== Biography ==
Shuka Saitō was born on August 16, 1996, the youngest of four children. She has an older sister and two brothers. She attended a hip-hop course in the fourth grade of elementary school, which had a great influence on her career aspirations at an early age. She took dance lessons until the third year of high school. In the second year of high school she also took singing lessons.

In 2015, Saitō attended an audition for the role of You Watanabe from the anime television series Love Live! Sunshine!! and got the role. She is part of the fictional group Aqours, which belongs to the Love Live! Franchise, and has released several singles with the group, which are very successful in Japan and some of which have received a gold record. At the eleventh Seiyū Awards in 2017, she received the Singing Award as a member of Aqours.

Shuka Saitō had other speaking roles in the anime television series Oresuki as Asaka Mayama. She also interpreted the song in the opening credits of the series with Papapa. In 2021, she had main speaking roles in anime television series Wonder Egg Priority as Rika Kawai. In addition, she spoke various characters in various video games, including Phantasy Star Online, Granblue Fantasy, Hakoniwa Company Works and Dolls Order.

In June 2019, Saitō announced that she would also work as a solo musician and signed a record deal with the Japanese music label Sacra Music. She released her debut single "36℃/Papapa" (36℃/パパパ) on November 20, 2019; "Papapa" was used as the opening theme to the anime television series Oresuki.

In August 2025, she released Best Album titled "Rabbit Girl" to commemorate her 6 years since her artist debut

In September 2025, Saitō left Sacra Music as well as Holy Peak, her talent agency of 13 years, to join the agency Fearless.

In April 2026, she was assigned to YORIDOCORO Agency

== Filmography ==
=== Anime television series ===
- Love Live! Sunshine!! (2016–17) as You Watanabe
- Time Bokan 24 (2016) as Child (ep 5)
- Time Bokan 24 (2017) as Child B (ep 14)
- Oresuki (2019) as Asaka "Sasanqua" Mayama
- D4DJ First Mix (2020) as DJ Misamisa (ep 2)
- Wonder Egg Priority (2021) as Rika Kawai
- Akebi's Sailor Uniform (2022) as Miki Fukumoto
- A Herbivorous Dragon of 5,000 Years Gets Unfairly Villainized (2023) as Water Saint (Japanese dub)
- Yohane the Parhelion: Sunshine in the Mirror (2023) as You

=== Video games ===
- Love Live! School Idol Festival (2016) as You Watanabe
- Uchi no Hime-sama ga Ichiban Kawaii (2016) as Amaterasu
- Dragon Genesis -bonds of holy war- (2017) as Proserpina
- Phantasy Star Online 2 es (2017) as Kae Traitor
- Hakoniwa Company Works (2017) as Meme Kazamidori
- Phantasy Star Online 2 es (2017) as Assassin Claw
- Phantasy Star Online 2 es (2017) as Evil Pirikanet
- Dolls Order (2018) as Lohengrin
- Qbit (2018) as Karasu Kayakari
- Granblue Fantasy (2019) as You Watanabe
- Love Live! School Idol Festival All Stars (2019) as You Watanabe
- Miko Note (2022) as Yumi Amano
- Samurai Maiden (2022) as Shingen Takeda
- Azur Lane (2023) as Felix Schultz
- Yohane the Parhelion: Blaze in the Deepblue (2023) as You

== Discography ==
=== Albums ===
No.	Single details	Catalog No.	Oricon chart peak position
1	Patchwork (パッチワーク): Released: August 18, 2021; Label: Sacra Music	VVCL-1903 ～ VVCL-1905 (Patchwork board Limited Edition), VVCL-1906 ～ VVCL-1907 (First Production Limited Edition), VVCL-1908 (regular)	13
2	Rabbit Girl: Released: August 6, 2025; Label: Sacra Music	VVCL-2273 ~ VVCL-2275(First Production Limited Edition CD + BD) VVCL-2276 (regular CD)	22

=== Singles ===
No.	Single details	Catalog No.	Oricon chart peak position
1	"36°C/Papapa" (36°C/パパパ): Released: November 20, 2019; Label: Sacra Music	VVCL-1547 (regular), VVCL-1545 ～ VVCL-1546 (limited), VVCL-1548 ～ VVCL-1549 (anime)	12
2	"Sekai no Hate" (セカイノハテ): Released: February 10, 2021; Label: Sacra Music	VVCL-1803 (regular), VVCL-1804/5 (limited), VVCL-1800/2 (First batch limited)	8
3	"Ippai Attena" (イッパイアッテナ): Released: August 17, 2022; Label: Sacra Music	VVCL-2087 (regular), VVCL-2085/6 (First batch limited)	12
4	"Bokura wa Genius" (僕らはジーニアス): Released: February 22, 2023; Label: Sacra Music	VVCL-2212 (regular), VVCL-2213/4 (limited), VVCL-2210/1 (First batch limited)	17

=== Mini albums ===
No.	Title	Catalog No.	Oricon peak position
1	Shoelace (くつひも): Released: August 14, 2019; Label: Sacra Music	VVCL-1495 (regular), VVCL-1493 ～ VVCL-1494 (limited), VVCL-1490 ～ VVCL-1492 (first limited)	5
2	Sunflower: Released: November 11, 2020; Label: Sacra Music	VVCL-1759 ~ VVLC-1759 (Limited Edition A), VVCL-1760 ~ VVLC-1761 (Limited Edition B), VVCL-1762 (regular)	11
3	Aishite Shimaeba (愛してしまえば): Released: August 9, 2023; Label: Sacra Music	VVCL-2318 (regular), VVCL-2316/7 (first limited)	14
4	555: Released: July 10, 2024; Label: Sacra Music		11
