= Ikizulive! Love Live! Bluebird =

Japanese media franchise

Official project visual. Clockwise from the center: Polka, Miracle (bottom left), Mai, Hanabi, Yukuri, Midori, Aurora, Akira, Shion, Noriko

Ikizulive! Love Live! Bluebird (イキヅライブ！ LOVELIVE! BLUEBIRD) is a project in the Love Live! multimedia franchise. It is a mixed media project with content primarily on X and YouTube. The project launched in May 2025.

== Plot ==
Love Academy High School (Love 学院高等学校, Love Gakuin Kōtō Gakkō), also known as L High, is a blended learning school with online classes as well as in-person education. The school has satellite campuses in Asakusa, Fukui Prefecture, Umeda, and Sendai.

Hoping to raise funds and attract new students, Polka Takahashi starts a school idol club called Ikizulive! (いきづらい部！, Ikizuraibu!) The name stems from an old club, which Polka felt was fitting as she had failed her entrance exams. School idols had fallen out of popularity by this point, but the club wishes to revitalize the concept.

== Characters ==
=== Ikizulive! ===
==== Asakusa ====
Polka Takahashi (高橋 ポルカ, Takahashi Poruka)
Voiced by: Honon Ayasaki
Polka is an energetic first-year student who attends L High's branch in Asakusa. She loves to break out into dance and move her feet. Polka is bad at mathematics. Her parents live in Argentina.
Mai Azabu (麻布 麻衣, Azabu Mai)
Voiced by: Rina Endō
Mai is a first-year student at the Asakusa campus. She is a web programmer and vice president of the club.
Akira Gotō (五桐 玲, Gotō Akira)
Voiced by: Seiri Miyano
Akira is a first-year student at Asakusa. An avid rock climber and weight lifter, she is from Numazu while her aunt lives near Otonokizaka Academy, so she is fairly knowledgeable about school idol groups like μ's and Aqours.
Hanabi Komagata (駒形 花火, Komagata Hanabi)
Voiced by: Kokoro Fujino
Hanabi is a first-year student in Asakusa. She is the daughter of a family who operates a kimono store and is eager to prove how they can still be worn in modern times.

==== Fukui ====
Miracle Kanazawa (金澤 奇跡, Kanazawa Mirakuru)
Voiced by: Aiha Sakano
Miracle is a second-year student at the Fukui campus and a chef who runs an online bakery. She formerly attended a cooking school but clashed with teachers, prompting her to transfer to L High so she could study by herself. Miracle is good friends with Noriko.
Noriko Chōfu (調布 のりこ, Chōfu Noriko)
Voiced by: Ria Seko
Noriko is a first-year at the Fukui campus. An anime otaku from the Hokuriku region, she aspires to become a voice actress. Noriko and Miracle are close friends.

==== Umeda ====
Yukuri Harumiya (春宮 ゆくり, Harumiya Yukuri)
Voiced by: Yuki Okumura
Yukuri is a first-year student at the Umeda campus. Skilled at ballet, she is an aspiring theater performer who hopes to join the Takarazuka Revue.
Aurora Konohana (此花 輝夜, Konohana Ōrora)
Voiced by: Akane Amasawa
Aurora is a beauty YouTuber who frequently travels overseas with her family and lived in Los Angeles before returning to Japan. She is a second-year student in Umeda.
Midori Yamada (山田 真緑, Yamada Midori)
Voiced by: Honoka Motomori
Midori is an environmentalist and first-year student at the Umeda Campus. She enjoys camping and nature, and works part-time jobs to donate her payments to charity.

==== Sendai ====
Shion Sasaki (佐々木 翔音, Sasaki Shion)
Voiced by: Aoi Suzunose
An online streamer and a first-year student at the Sendai campus. Shion was initially doubtful of the club, but is ultimately the final member to join. She is a fan of Umi Sonoda from μ's.

=== Other characters ===
Kotori Minami (南 ことり, Minami Kotori)
A teacher at Otonokizaka Academy whom Polka and Akira meet when they visit the campus. She helps Ikizulive! organize a concert at the school. Online, she uses the handle "Chun-sensei" (チュン先生).
She was mentioned by her username in posts by the characters' X accounts before her identity was confirmed in the First Fan Book. Yuhei Murota, the lead character designer for Love Live! School Idol Project, created Kotori's adult appearance.

== History ==
Project logo

The project was announced at the end of the Yokohama leg of the Love Live! Series Asia Tour 2024 on February 2, 2025. It officially launched on May 12.

"What is My Life?", the first single by Ikizulive!, was released on July 30, 2025. Each of the ten club members also received solo songs. The group's first live show took place between February 14 and 15, 2026 at Makuhari Messe.

During the project's first year, the story was primarily told through YouTube videos and X accounts representing each character. The latter method was dropped in February 2026. Love Live! creator Sakurako Kimino wrote the tweets, which were compiled into a book released on September 18, 2026.
