= Chiemi Tanaka =

Japanese voice actress

- 田中 ちえ美
- Born: October 6, 1994 (age 31); Shizuoka Prefecture, Japan
- Occupations: Voice actress; singer
- Years active: 2015–present
- Agent: Stay Luck
- Notable work: Sakura Quest as Ririko Oribe; Love Live! Nijigasaki High School Idol Club as Rina Tennoji
- Height: 154 cm (5 ft 1 in)

Chiemi Tanaka (田中 ちえ美, Tanaka Chiemi; born October 6, 1994) is a Japanese voice actress and singer from Shizuoka Prefecture who is affiliated with Stay Luck. She is known for her roles as Ririko Oribe in Sakura Quest and Rina Tennoji in Love Live! Nijigasaki High School Idol Club.

== Career ==
Tanaka was inspired to pursue a voice acting career after seeing the anime television series Macross Frontier. She enrolled at a voice acting school operated by the talent agency Sigma Seven, and after finishing her training, formally became affiliated with them in 2015. In 2016, she played Sasame Tsuji in Three Leaves, Three Colors. The following year, she played her first major role as Ririko Oribe in Sakura Quest. That same year, she was cast as Rina Tennoji in the mobile game Love Live! School Idol Festival All Stars, later reprising the role in the anime series Love Live! Nijigasaki High School Idol Club.

In 2021, Tanaka formed the music duo NACHERRY with fellow Love Live! cast member Natsumi Murakami.

== Filmography ==
=== Anime ===
2016

- Three Leaves, Three Colors, Sasame Tsuji
- Tales of Zestiria the X, Handmaiden

2017

- Sakura Quest, Ririko Oribe
- Kino's Journey, Child
- Puzzle & Dragons X, Student

2019

- A Certain Magical Index III, Boy
- Hi Score Girl, Employee

2020

- Love Live! Nijigasaki High School Idol Club, Rina Tennoji
- Warlords of Sigrdrifa, Child
- The Day I Became A God, Staff member

2021

- The Duke of Death and His Maid, Maid B
- Blue Reflection Ray, Maid B

2022

- Love Live! Nijigasaki High School Idol Club 2nd Season, Rina Tennoji
- The Little Lies We All Tell, Rikka

2024

- Quality Assurance in Another World, Kana Ōta

2026

- Kaya-chan Isn't Scary, Yuzu-chan
- The Strongest Job Is Apparently Not a Hero or a Sage, but an Appraiser (Provisional)!, Meijin

=== Video games ===
2019
Love Live! School Idol Festival All Stars, Rina Tennoji
2020
Magia Record, Rion Yuzuki
2023
Azur Lane, Ting An
