= A Herbivorous Dragon of 5,000 Years Gets Unfairly Villainized =

Japanese light novel series

- First light novel volume cover

齢5000年の草食ドラゴン、いわれなき邪竜認定 (Yowai 5000-nen no Sōshoku Dragon, Iwarenaki Jaryū Nintei)
- Novel series
- Written by: Kaisei Enomoto
- Published by: Shōsetsuka ni Narō
- Original run: June 2017 – June 2020
- Light novel
- Written by: Kaisei Enomoto
- Illustrated by: Shugao
- Published by: Kadokawa Shoten
- Imprint: Kadokawa Sneaker Bunko
- Original run: February 1, 2018 – October 1, 2019
- Volumes: 3
- Manga
- Written by: Kaisei Enomoto
- Illustrated by: Kōichi Muro
- Published by: Square Enix
- Magazine: Monthly Gangan Joker
- Original run: January 22, 2018 – November 22, 2019
- Volumes: 5
- Original net animation
- Directed by: Liu Siwen
- Produced by: Kang Jun Li Cheng
- Written by: Liu Siwen; Li Jiajie
- Studio: Studio LAN
- Licensed by: Crunchyroll
- Released: July 30, 2022 – December 19, 2024
- Runtime: 13–14 minutes
- Episodes: 24

A Herbivorous Dragon of 5,000 Years Gets Unfairly Villainized (Japanese: 齢5000年の草食ドラゴン、いわれなき邪竜認定, Hepburn: Yowai 5000-nen no Sōshoku Dragon, Iwarenaki Jaryū Nintei; lit. 'A 5000-year-old Herbivore Dragon Was Recognized as an Evil Dragon For No Reason') is a Japanese light novel series written by Kaisei Enomoto and illustrated by Shugao. It was serialized online between June 2017 and June 2020 on the user-generated novel publishing website Shōsetsuka ni Narō. It was later acquired by Kadokawa Shoten, who have published three volumes from February 2018 to October 2019 under their Kadokawa Sneaker Bunko imprint. A manga adaptation with art by Kōichi Muro was serialized in Square Enix's shōnen manga magazine Monthly Gangan Joker from January 2018 to November 2019. It was collected in five tankōbon volumes. An original net animation (ONA) adaptation by Studio LAN aired in Chinese on Bilibili from July to October 2022, with the Japanese dub airing on television from January to March 2023. A second season aired in Japan from October to December 2024.

== Plot ==
Ravendia is a 5000 year old dragon who is constantly attacked due to his frightening appearance, even though he is actually a weak coward and a vegetarian. One day, an orphan named Reiko offers to sacrifice herself to him if he would defeat the Demon Lord in exchange. Not wanting to harm her, he pretends to eat her soul. However, this makes her believe she has become his disciple, and her sheer belief causes her to awaken magical powers and monstrous super strength. Reiko drags an unwilling Ravendia on a quest to defeat the Demon Lord, but he starts to care for her.

== Characters ==
Evil Dragon Ravendia (邪竜レーヴェンディア, Jaryū Rēvendia)
Voiced by: Hōchū Ōtsuka (Japanese)
Reiko (レーコ, Rēko)
Voiced by: Aoi Yūki (Japanese)
Aliante (アリアンテ, Ariante)
Voiced by: Mariko Miyase (Japanese)
Water Saint (水の聖女, Mizu no Seijo)
Voiced by: Shuka Saitō (Japanese)
Ryatt (ライアット, Raiatto)
Voiced by: Yoshino Nanjō (Japanese)
Vanessa (ヴァネッサ, Vuanessa)
Voiced by: Yui Ishikawa (Japanese)
Rosetta (ロゼッタ, Rozetta)
Voiced by: Iori Noguchi (Japanese)
Leader of "Shikoku no Chi" (Jet Black Blood)
Voiced by: Takuma Nagatsuka (Japanese)
Woman in the organization
Voiced by: Momo Sakurai (Japanese)
Edward (エドワルド, Edowarudo)
Voiced by: Haruki Ishiya (Japanese)
Pravas (プラバス, Purabasu)
Voiced by: Chafurin (Japanese)
Mysterious Man
Voiced by: Kōhei Amasaki (Japanese)

== Media ==
=== Light novel ===
The series written by Kaisei Enomoto was serialized online between June 2017 and June 2020 on the user-generated novel publishing website Shōsetsuka ni Narō. It was later acquired by Kadokawa Shoten, who have published three light novel volumes with illustrations by Shugao from February 1, 2018, to October 1, 2019, under their Kadokawa Sneaker Bunko imprint.

No.	Release date	ISBN
1	February 1, 2018	978-4-04-106530-3
2	September 1, 2018	978-4-04-106531-0
3	October 1, 2019	978-4-04-107977-5

=== Manga ===
A manga adaptation with art by Kōichi Muro was serialized in Square Enix's shōnen manga magazine Monthly Gangan Joker from January 22, 2018, to November 22, 2019. It was collected in five tankōbon volumes.

No.	Japanese release date	Japanese ISBN
1	June 13, 2018	978-4-7575-5743-7
2	December 13, 2018	978-4-7575-5943-1
3	April 12, 2019	978-4-7575-6094-9
4	September 21, 2019	978-4-7575-6311-7
5	March 21, 2020	978-4-7575-6568-5

=== Anime ===
On November 21, 2021, a Japanese-Chinese original net animation (ONA) adaptation produced by Bilibili and animated by Studio LAN was announced. It is directed by Liu Siwen and written by Siwen and Li Jiajie. The Chinese dub aired on Bilibili from July 30 to October 8, 2022, while the Japanese dub aired on television from January 6 to March 24, 2023, on AT-X, Tokyo MX, and BS Fuji. For the Chinese dub, the opening theme song is "Wèi guāng" (为光) by Liu Junlang, while the ending theme song is "Tǎng zài qíngkōng xià" (躺在晴空下) by Xiǎo yuán. For the Japanese dub, the opening theme song is "Bokura wa Genius" (僕らはジーニアス; "We're Geniuses") by Shuka Saitō, while the ending theme song is "buddy" by Amber's. Crunchyroll licensed the series outside of Asia.

A second season was announced on October 18, 2023. It aired in Japan from October 3 to December 19, 2024. For the Japanese dub, the opening theme song is "Brave one" performed by Fukurow note, while the ending theme song is "Ameiro Suisai" (飴色水彩; "Amber Watercolor") performed by MiMi. It was also broadcast on Bilibili for the Chinese dub version.

==== Episode list ====
===== Season 1 =====
No. overall	No. in season	Title	Original release date
1	1	"Please eat me up, great evil dragon!" Transliteration: "Watashi o Omeshiagari Kudasai! Sōshoku Ryū-sama" (Japanese: 私をお召し上がりください！邪竜様)	July 30, 2022
A young orphan named Reiko offers herself as a sacrifice to a 5000-year-old dragon named Ravendia in exchange for protecting her village from the Demon Lord. However, Ravendia is actually a cowardly dragon who prefers a vegetarian diet. When Reiko insists he eats her or she kills herself in disgrace, he pretends to have eaten her soul as a sacrifice, causing Reiko to believe she is now his disciple. Returning Reiko to her village, Ravendia hopes he can return to his cave for a few hundred years until the village forgets his existence, but Reiko's friend, Raiotto, is furious that he ate Reiko's soul and tries to attack him. Suddenly, Dark Wolves attack the village, and Reiko reveals her belief in the loss of her soul has unlocked powerful repressed magical abilities and she drives the wolves away. Based on his 5000 years of experience, Ravendia realises Reiko might just be the most terrifyingly powerful wizard in history.
2	2	"Let's set out on an expedition, great evil dragon" Transliteration: "Tabi ni Demashō! Sōshoku Ryū-sama" (Japanese: 旅に出ましょう！邪竜様)	August 1, 2022
Despite Raiotto's promise to save Reiko's soul, Reiko believes she and Ravendia should leave the village to begin hunting the Demon Lord. Reiko steals a magician's outfit from Raiotto's home, though he had intended it to be a gift to her anyway, and departs with Ravendia. To avoid the Demon Lord, Ravendia claims that he must discover and join whatever rebel army who is currently opposes the Demon Lord. Reiko uses her clairvoyance to direct them to Paleodona City where strong adventurers gather and Ravendia hopes he can abandon Reiko there and quietly slip away. Unfortunately, Paleodona is under attack by monsters whom Reiko defeats. With his 5000 years of experience, Ravendia is able to direct Paleodona's General, Aliante, to the monster who is controlling all the other monsters, thus saving the city. That night, Reiko has a nightmare about her father, but she is comforted by Ravendia's presence.
3	3	"You will always be my great evil dragon!" Transliteration: "Kisama, Hontō ni Yowai no ka?" (Japanese: 貴様、本当に弱いのか？)	August 6, 2022
Ravendia attempts to convince Aliante that Reiko's power does not come from him. Aliante warns Ravendia that Reiko is still a novice at controlling her vast magic, so there is a chance that it will corrupt her and actually turns her into a true demonic dragon. She also asks if Ravendia really intends to oppose the Demon Lord, and when he admits he is unsure, she reveals she is a General of the Demon Lord's army and attacks him. Reiko awakens and protects Ravendia but is swiftly defeated as she has no experience with swords before. Aliante reveals her sword doesn't cut; it just causes intense pain, and hits him repeatedly. Eventually, Aliante is forced to accept that Ravendia really is a weak coward, so she admits her loyalty to the Demon Lord was a lie to test him and agrees to keep his weakness a secret. Realising he has to stay with Reiko, Ravendia agrees to convince her that the fight with Aliante was a dream. The next morning, Reiko awakens and, to her incredulous shock, finds out that Ravendia has shrunk to the size of a large dog.
4	4	"Let's continue our journey, great evil dragon" Transliteration: "Tabi o Tsuzukemashō! Sōshoku Ryū-sama" (Japanese: 旅を続けましょう！邪竜様)	August 13, 2022
Ravendia is revealed to have shrunk due to a potion given by Aliante, since his large size was inconvenient to live in a city, though he lies and tells Reiko that he shrank himself. Raiotto arrives at Paleodona to search for Reiko but when he learns Aliante fought against Ravendia, he asks her to become her disciple, so she promises to put him through hellish training. Having left Paleodona, Ravendia is starving but cannot eat anything in case of Reiko discovers he is a vegetarian. They are stopped by the bandits who want to sell both her and Ravendia on the black market. Reiko easily beats up the bandit leader who apologises profusely and even agrees to free the slaves he has imprisoned in their secret cave. Ravendia notices a second cave nearby so he sends Reiko to escort the freed slaves and imprison the bandits. Left alone, Ravendia enters the second cave hoping to feast on his favourite cave moss, only to find out that the cave is a home to a dark spirit.
5	5	"Famous teacher produces a good student" Transliteration: "Sōshoku Ryū-sama, Shishō ni Deau" (Japanese: 邪竜様、師匠に出会う)	August 20, 2022
Ravendia attempts to flee but the dark spirit turns out to be friendly, and prepares Ravendia a vegetarian feast. The dark spirit explains he was once the God of Hunting who first taught the humans to hunt, but once the humans no longer needed him, he was slowly forgotten and has been alone for centuries. Feeling grateful for the feast and sympathetic for him, Ravendia asks him to learn how to hunt and the God of Hunting promises to teach Ravendia everything about hunting in only three hours. However, due to various factors, Ravendia fails every lesson, from physical fitness to archery, even to unarmed combat against a rabbit. Dejected at his failure, the God of Hunting grants Ravendia a spell to strengthen his claws, then returns to his cave thoroughly depressed with both promising never to mention their failed training to anyone. Ravendia falls asleep until Reiko returns and reports she has found another city called Selianen, which is large, prosperous and only protected by a shallow moat so she demands that they capture it for themselves before the Demon Lord does.
6	6	"Let's subdue Selianen, great evil dragon" Transliteration: "Seifuku Shimashō! Sōshoku Ryū-sama" (Japanese: 征服しましょう！邪竜様)	August 27, 2022
Approaching Selianen, Reiko realises the city is a home to the Water Saint. The Saint contacts Ravendia to threaten him but Reiko easily uses her own powers to scare the Saint away and deactivate Selianen's magic barrier. Now able to enter Selianen, the citizens explain that many years ago, the Saint created an oasis from the desert, allowing Selianen to grow into a city. Ravendia and Reiko lodge at an inn with the former decides to search for the Saint to clear up the misunderstanding. The Saint is so scared that she hides in whatever water she can, but by coincidence, a thirsty Ravendia keeps trying to drink the water she is hiding in, so she keeps running away. The children notices Ravendia is starving and offers him a fruit, but the Saint thinks he means to eat the children and leaps to defend them. Thirsty and hungry, Ravendia just wants to go back to the inn. The Saint, thinking she is being blackmailed, agrees to guide him there if he spares Selianen. Ravendia agrees and reminds her that she needs to repair the barrier, which she completely forgot.
7	7	"You must not waste food" Transliteration: "Tabemono o Somatsu ni suru koto wa Yurusan" (Japanese: 食べ物を粗末にすることは許さん)	September 3, 2022
Reiko is unhappy that the humans worship the Saint as she knows that she is actually a Demon who can manipulate water. An evil dragon who is loyal to the Demon Lord and a demon named Xu senses that the barrier is weaken and decides to destroy the Saint. The Saint, poorly disguised as a maid, tries to urge Ravendia to leave, but when she serves him rotten food, Reiko attempts to kill her, causing the Saint to flee. Seeing the wasted food, Ravendia scolds Reiko for using her power recklessly when it should be used to help others, so he forbids her from using her powers except in self-defence before sending her to play with the children. Reiko is confused by the children's description of Ravendia as "small and cute" while she sees him as "great and powerful" and becomes convinced they must mean that a second dragon is somewhere nearby. Ravendia is teleported underwater by the Saint in an attempt to drown him. The Evil Dragon attacks Selianen but Reiko, confusing him for the "small and cute" dragon, approaches him.
8	8	"Search for the cute little dragon" Transliteration: "Doradora o Tazumete" (Japanese: ドラドラをたずねて)	September 10, 2022
The Evil Dragon takes Reiko's invitation to play as a dual challenge and accepts. Reiko, having misunderstood the children's instructions to "play with the cute dragon", throws the Evil Dragon like a football, repeatedly crashes him into the ground. The magical shockwaves from throwing the Evil Dragon into the ground causes the Saint to lose focus and her spell to drown Ravendia fails. Ravendia is saved when the strengthened claws he got from the God of Hunting becomes a Black Nebula that lifts him out of the ocean. The Saint constructs a water cage to drain Ravendia's magic. This, however, drains the spell to keep Ravendia small. Thus, he explosively returns to his original giant size, sending him and the Saint back through the portal to Selianen. The Saint believes she has failed but Ravendia insists she earned the title of a Saint through her good deeds and deserves to stay in Selianen. The Saint finally believes that Ravendia is a good dragon. A Death Locust, a low rank demon that spoils the crops, steals Xu and infects the Saint with him.
9	9	"Let's start the battle against the saint, great evil dragon!" Transliteration: "Kessen Shimashō! Sōshoku Ryū-sama" (Japanese: 決戦しましょう！邪竜様)	September 17, 2022
The Saint reverts to an evil water demon, threatening to drown Selianen and turn it into a swamp. However, the mud she creates to flood the streets is mistaken by the villagers as fertile soil to help their farms, so they worship her even more. The Saint cries at her failure and tells Ravendia that when she was in the Demon Lord's army, she was bullied for being weak. To prove herself, she attempted to victimize the refugees who are lost in the desert, but her rain was hailed as a miracle. The refugees build farms and eventually, the city of Selianen where they worshipped her as a Saint. Ravendia suspects the Saint can no longer tell if she is a Saint or a demon. A little girl thanks the Saint for her blessings and Ravendia points out that a person's past doesn't matter as long as they keep trying to be better. The Saint returns to normal due to Xu leaving her but infects Ravendia, planning to expose his evil nature instead.
10	10	"Let's enjoy the festival, great evil dragon!" Transliteration: "Omatsuri desu yo! Sōshoku Ryū-sama" (Japanese: お祭りですよ！邪竜様)	September 24, 2022
The Saint invites both Reiko and Ravendia to stay and attend the Saint's Festival. Xu struggles to find any evil in Ravendia's heart but is determined to find something. Meanwhile, the Evil Dragon himself wanders the fields outside Selianen, sulking as he is stuck between his desire to destroy Selianen and his fear of Reiko, where he is noticed by the adventurer's guild. The news reaches Aliante, who stops Raiotto from leaving to save Reiko until his training is complete. She goes by herself instead to see what trouble Ravendia has caused. At the festival, Ravendia is starving but the sheep keeps stealing his vegetarian food, which is being given by the little girl, causing him to wish that the food was all his. His brief selfish thought is enough for Xu to urge him to give in to his selfishness. Ravendia attempts to fight the sheep for all the food, but they beat him up instead, returning him to normal. The little girl promises to find food for him and the Evil Dragon who is still sulking in the fields. This makes Ravendia learnt about the Evil Dragon.
11	11	"Instinct"; Transliteration: "Bōsō" (Japanese: 暴走)	October 1, 2022
Ravendia cannot believe over how psychologically damaged the Evil Dragon is after Reiko used him like a football. Xu finally returns and forcefully possesses the Evil Dragon in an attempt to possess Reiko so that he can rule the world, including Selianen. He attempts to kill Ravendia but Reiko saves him. Despite the Evil Dragon's warnings, Xu infects Reiko but finds out that the darkness in her heart is so powerful that he is sucked into it and devoured. This causes the memory of Reiko's father being killed by the monsters to emerge. The sudden traumatic memories cause Reiko to unleash a massive magical explosion, destroying the countryside as she begins to painfully transform into a demonic dragon. Aliante arrives just in time as Reiko plans to kill the Saint for continually disrespecting Ravendia, showing her belief in Ravendia still exists despite her madness. Faced with such overwhelming powers, Aliante says they should run. Ravendia hopes this might be his chance to escape from Reiko as she is now so powerful that she couldn't possibly need him anymore. However, he can't bring himself to abandon her and insists on staying.
12	12	"The Rescue"; Transliteration: "Kore kara mo Yoroshiku Onegaishimasu! Sōshoku Ryū-sama" (Japanese: これからも宜しくお願いします！邪竜様)	October 8, 2022
Determined to protect someone else rather than himself, Ravendia approaches Reiko but is pushed back by her magic. Aliante realises due to Reiko still believing in Ravendia, her magic doesn't actually hurt him, which she proves by using the unfortunate Ravendia as a shield. While Reiko continues to painfully transform into a demonic dragon, Ravendia decides to return to his original giant size to reach her. Aliante distracts Reiko while the Saint extracts the potion from his body that keeps Ravendia small. Now giant again, Ravendia uses the now unconscious Evil Dragon's wings and his own Black Nedula claws to slingshot himself at Reiko. The impact makes Reiko remembers a comforting memory of her father, returning her to a human. Ravendia is relieved that Reiko is back to normal but still forces her to apologise for partially destroying Selianen. The Saint announces that the festival will still continue but is slightly jealous over how the people hail Aliante as a hero instead of her. Reiko and Ravendia volunteer to help with rebuilding Selianen with the latter tells the former that if she ever feels like she is losing control of her powers again, she should simply think of the precious memories of her father. Reiko promises that she will and smiles happily to him.

===== Season 2 =====
(Note: Titles and air dates are taken from Crunchyroll verbatim [sic].)

No. overall	No. in season	Title	Original release date
13	1	"Wecome to Asga!"; Transliteration: "Asuga e Yōkoso" (Japanese: アスガへようこそ！)	October 2, 2024
14	2	"The Black Blood"; Transliteration: "Shikkoku no Chi" (Japanese: 漆黒の血)	October 2, 2024
15	3	"The King's Destiny"; Transliteration: "Kokuō no Shukumei" (Japanese: 国王の宿命)	October 9, 2024
16	4	"Rosetta, Princess of Rebellion"; Transliteration: "Hangyaky no Ōjo Rosetta" (Japanese: 反逆の王女ロゼッタ)	October 16, 2024
17	5	"The True Disciple of the Evil Dragon"; Transliteration: "Sei naru Sōshoku Ryū-sama no Shito" (Japanese: 正なる邪竜様の使徒)	October 23, 2024
18	6	"Rescue Mission"; Transliteration: "Kyūjo Katsudō" (Japanese: 救助活動)	October 30, 2024
19	7	"The Great Mage Has Risen!"; Transliteration: "Daimadō-shi Fukkatsu!" (Japanese: 大魔導士復活！)	November 6, 2024
20	8	"The Source of Magic: The Power of Emotions."; Transliteration: "Maryoku no Minamoto wa Kanjō no Chikara" (Japanese: 魔力の源は感情の力)	November 13, 2024
21	9	"The Evil Dragon is Decending!"; Transliteration: "Sōshoku Ryū Kōrin!" (Japanese: 邪竜降臨！)	November 20, 2024
22	10	"Crisis in Asga"; Transliteration: "Asuga no Kiki" (Japanese: アスガの危機)	November 27, 2024
23	11	"The Light of Hope"; Transliteration: "Kibō no Hikari" (Japanese: 希望の光)	December 4, 2024
24	12	"Sisters United! A New Chapter for Asga"; Transliteration: "Shimai-shin Hitotsu ni, Asuga no Mirai e" (Japanese: 姉妹心ひとつに、アスガの未来へ)	December 11, 2024
