= The Little Lies We All Tell =

Japanese manga series

- First tankōbon volume cover

4人はそれぞれウソをつく (Yonin wa Sorezore Uso o Tsuku)
- Genre: Comedy
- Manga
- Written by: Madoka Kashihara
- Published by: Kodansha
- Magazine: Bessatsu Shōnen Magazine
- Original run: April 9, 2020 – March 9, 2023
- Volumes: 3
- Anime television series
- Directed by: Makoto Hoshino
- Written by: Megumi Shimizu
- Music by: Tomoki Kikuya
- Studio: Studio Flad
- Licensed by: Crunchyroll
- Original network: ANN (ABC TV, TV Asahi)
- Original run: October 16, 2022 – December 25, 2022
- Episodes: 11
- icon

The Little Lies We All Tell (Japanese: 4人はそれぞれウソをつく, Hepburn: Yonin wa Sorezore Uso o Tsuku; lit. '4 People Lie in Their Own Way') is a Japanese manga series written and illustrated by Madoka Kashihara. It was serialized in Kodansha's shōnen manga magazine Bessatsu Shōnen Magazine from April 2020 to March 2023. An anime television series adaptation produced by Studio Flad aired from October to December 2022.

== Plot ==
Rikka, Chiyo, Sekine, and Tsubasa are four students at Kashihara Girls' Academy Junior High. However, unbeknownst to anyone, each girl harbors a secret: Rikka is an alien, Chiyo is a rogue ninja, Sekine is a psychic who can read women's minds, and Tsubasa is a boy cross-dressing as a girl to take his older sister's place.

== Characters ==
Rikka (リッカ)
Voiced by: Chiemi Tanaka
A colonel and ace pilot in the Galactic Revolutionary Army, who poses as a student from the school, having crash landed there while awaiting rescue.
Chiyo (千代)
Voiced by: Natsumi Murakami
A second year student at Kashihara Girls' Academy, who claims to be a runaway ninja. She acts dim-witted enough not to even know that the Earth is a sphere.
Sekine (関根)
Voiced by: Ayane Sakura
A second year student at Kashihara Girls' Academy who claims to be a psychic that can read women's minds. She knows the true identities of Rikka and Chiyo due to this, but cannot read the mind of Tsubasa, who is actually a boy. Her ability often lands her in the role of the "straight man", the one who points out the absurdity of others' actions. Sekine usually wears glasses because removing them causes her psychic powers to go out of control, wreaking massive havoc on her surroundings.
Tsubasa (翼) / Tsuyoshi (剛)
Voiced by: Megumi Han
A boy who cross-dresses as a girl, as well as the technically only male among the main characters. He was forced to switch places with his twin sister after she learned that a popular idol was enrolling in the boys' school he had been accepted into. Tsuyoshi is unfamiliar with topics related to girls. He has a keen interest in astronomy and possesses extensive knowledge on the subject.
Tsubasa (つばさ)
Voiced by: Yu Serizawa
Tsubasa/Tsuyoshi's twin sister. She is the one responsible for Tsubasa cross-dressing as a girl. She is a self-centered person and forced her reluctant younger brother to comply by threatening: "If you refuse, I'll kill you."
Hanzō (半蔵)
Voiced by: Yūya Hirose
Chiyo's younger brother. He constantly looks for an opening to attack Chiyo, who is a runaway ninja, but has never once succeeded.
Brian-sensei (ブライアン先生, Buraian-sensei)
Voiced by: Yōji Ueda
Tthe English teacher at Kashihara Girls' Academy.
Masukuma (マスクマ)
Voiced by: Tomoko Kaneda
A mascot character that Chiyo admires.
Narrator (ナレーション, Narēshon)
Voiced by: Hōchū Ōtsuka

== Media ==
=== Manga ===
Written and illustrated by Madoka Kashihara, The Little Lies We All Tell was serialized in Kodansha's shōnen manga magazine Bessatsu Shōnen Magazine from April 9, 2020, to March 9, 2023. Kodansha has collected its chapters into individual tankōbon volumes. Three volumes were released from December 17, 2020, to May 9, 2023.

==== Volumes ====
No.	Release date	ISBN
1	December 17, 2020	978-4-06-522479-3
2	April 7, 2022	978-4-06-527535-1
3	May 9, 2023	978-4-06-529862-6

=== Anime ===
In March 2022, it was announced that the series would receive an anime television series adaptation. It was produced by Studio Flad and directed by Makoto Hoshino, with scripts written by Megumi Shimizu, character designs handled by Ruriko Watanabe, and music composed by Tomoki Kikuya. The series aired from October 16 to December 25, 2022, on ABC and TV Asahi's Animazing!!! programming block. (Note: ABC and TV Asahi listed the series premiere October 15 at 26:00, which is effectively October 16 at 2:00 a.m. JST.) The opening theme song is "Eclipse" by Nacherry, a voice unit composed of Chiemi Tanaka and Natsumi Murakami, while ending theme song is "For 4 Forever" by Chiemi Tanaka, Natsumi Murakami, Ayane Sakura, and Megumi Han as their respective characters. Crunchyroll streamed the series.

==== Episodes ====
No.	Title	Directed by (Note: Information is taken from the ending credits of each episode.)	Written by	Storyboarded by	Original release date
1	"The 4 Girls' Secrets"; Transliteration: "4-Nin no Himitsu" (Japanese: 4人のヒミツ)	Makoto Hoshino	Megumi Shimizu	Makoto Hoshino	October 16, 2022
2	"School Festival"; Transliteration: "Bunkasai" (Japanese: 文化祭)	Yūsaku Saotome	Rie Koshika	Katsuyuki Kodera; Makoto Hoshino	October 23, 2022
3	"Surprise"; Transliteration: "Sapuraizu" (Japanese: サプライズ)	Takanori Yano	Megumu Sasano	Makoto Hoshino	October 30, 2022
4	"Wish Upon a Star"; Transliteration: "Hoshi ni Negai o" (Japanese: 星に願いを)	Hiroshi Kubo	Megumi Shimizu	Hiroshi Kubo	November 6, 2022
5	"Beach"; Transliteration: "Umi" (Japanese: 海)	Kōsuke Kobayashi	Megumu Sasano	Shōgo Arai; Makoto Hoshino	November 13, 2022
6	"The Sleepover"; Transliteration: "Otomari" (Japanese: おとまり)	Yūsaku Saotome	Rie Koshika	Dashiyo Hatsumi	November 20, 2022
7	"Ring Out! The Songs of Friends"; Transliteration: "Hibike! Tomo no Utagoe" (Japanese: 響け！友の歌声)	Takanori Yano	Megumi Shimizu	Makoto Hoshino	November 27, 2022
8	"Hanzo's Challenge"; Transliteration: "Hanzō no Chōsen" (Japanese: 半蔵の挑戦)	Yūsaku Saotome	Megumi Shimizu	Taiichi Oikawa	December 4, 2022
9	"Find Fuku-chan!"; Transliteration: "Fuku-chan o Sagase!" (Japanese: フクちゃんをさがせ！)	Kōsuke Kobayashi	Rie Koshika	Shōgo Arai; Makoto Hoshino	December 11, 2022
10	"Atami"; Transliteration: "Atami" (Japanese: 熱海)	Yūsaku Saotome	Megumu Sasano	Dashiyo Hatsumi	December 18, 2022
11	"Goodbye, Colonel"; Transliteration: "Sayonara Taisa" (Japanese: さよなら大佐)	Makoto Hoshino	Megumi Shimizu	Makoto Hoshino	December 25, 2022

== Reception ==
Anime News Network had three editors review the first episode of the anime: Richard Eisenbeis was critical of the show's "general comedic premise" being lesser and too similar to Spy × Family, but noted that it went for "slightly traumatic humor" in the vein of Please Tell Me! Galko-chan, ending that: "While there's nothing overtly "wrong" or "bad" about this show, I feel that it lives or dies based on how much you enjoy the humor. It's a show that you really should try out for yourself and then go on from there." Caitlin Moore was initially put off by the first few minutes with its early revelation of the characters' secrets and potential transphobic humor involving Tsubasa/Tsuyoshi, but was pleasantly surprised by the lack of the latter and praised the show's template of being a gag anime similar to "30 Rock with the chaotic energy of Asobi Asobase." Nicholas Dupree criticized the premiere for being filled with "tired, low-energy comedy that occasionally stumbles into a sensible chuckle but otherwise sits around repeating itself," and failing to replicate Kaguya-sama's comedic style due to an unpolished production, calling it "a show that is trying just hard enough that it's embarrassing when the jokes don't land, but not trying hard enough to feel like earnest comedy, which is a really dull valley to get caught in."

Moore reviewed the complete anime series in 2023 and gave it an overall B grade. Despite finding some "middling animation and forgettable music" throughout the production, she called it "one of the most consistently funny, occasionally surprising comedies of the season", praising its balance of delivering "K-On!-style iyashikei" and Asobi Asobase's "gross-out humor" with "an almost subversive undertone" to them, concluding that "The Little Lies We All Tell wasn't the most remarkable series of Fall 2022, but I found it to be the one I watched most consistently. Every week, I could look forward to coming home from a challenging day at work, kicking off my shoes, and enjoying an episode I knew would make me laugh without the well-worn anime tropes that frustrate me or ask me to think too hard. Sometimes, that's all you want or need."
