= Sakurako Kimino =

Japanese novelist

Sakurako Kimino (公野 櫻子, Kimino Sakurako) is a Japanese novelist. She created Sister Princess and Strawberry Panic!, two very successful bishōjo series where almost all the characters in both series are young girls. She also created Love Live!, which has been adapted into four animated series, and three iOS and Android games. She has had her work serialized in the Japanese bishōjo magazine Dengeki G's Magazine, published by ASCII Media Works. She is also the creator of the light novel series Baby Princess, which was serialized in Dengeki G's Magazine.

== Works ==
- Sister Princess (1999–2003)
- Puppy Girls ~Watashi no Oji-sama~ (2003)
- Strawberry Panic! (2003–2005)
- Love Live! (2010–present)
- Baby Princess (2009–2011)
- Love Live! Sunshine!! (2015–present)
- Love Live! Nijigasaki High School Idol Club (2017-present)
- Love Live! Superstar!! (2021-present)
- Ikizulive! Love Live! Bluebird (2025-present)
