= Baby Princess =

Japanese light novel series

- First tankōbon volume cover

ベイビー・プリンセス (Beibī Purinsesu)
- Light novel
- Written by: Sakurako Kimino
- Illustrated by: Sana Wakatsuki
- Published by: ASCII Media Works
- Imprint: Dengeki Bunko
- Original run: April 10, 2009 – May 10, 2011
- Volumes: 7
- Manga
- Written by: Sakurako Kimino
- Illustrated by: Yasuhiro Miyama
- Published by: ASCII Media Works
- Magazine: Dengeki G's Magazine
- Original run: May 2011 – August 2013
- Volumes: 3
- Original video animation

Baby Princess 2D Paradise 0 (DVD) Baby Princess 3D Paradise 0 (Blu-ray)
- Directed by: Takayuki Inagaki
- Written by: Yūko Kakihara
- Studio: Studio Comet
- Released: July 20, 2011
- Runtime: 30 minutes

Baby Princess (ベイビー・プリンセス, Beibī Purinsesu) is a series of Japanese illustrated short stories written by Sakurako Kimino with illustrations by Natsuki Mibu and Yuki Kiriga. The stories were a part of a reader participation game in ASCII Media Works' Dengeki G's Magazine where readers could influence the progression of the story. The project was first unveiled in the October 2007 issue of Dengeki G's Magazine, and ran until the June 2012 issue.

A light novel adaptation written by Kimino with illustrations by Sana Wakatsuki was published in seven volumes under Dengeki Bunko between April 2009 and May 2011. A manga adaptation illustrated by Yasuhiro Miyama was serialized between the May 2011 and August 2013 issues of Dengeki G's Magazine. An original video animation adaptation by Studio Comet was released on July 20, 2011, on Blu-ray as a 3D and 2D edition set with the title Baby Princess 3D Paradise 0 (with special 3D-glasses) and on DVD as a regular 2D edition with the title Baby Princess 2D Paradise 0.

== Plot ==
When his grandmother and last remaining relative dies, first-year high school student Yōtarō is orphaned. He ends up being adopted into a family of 19 daughters, each with a different personality, ranging in age from several months old to 18 years old. His adventures begin when he moves in with his "true family".

== Characters ==
Note – the author of the light novel got carried away with the idea of having the sisters being a year apart in age. Based on the character birth dates given on the OVA website, there would actually be 2 calendar years between when the first and last girls were born in which a daughter could not have been born, and therefore some of the ages given are not consistent with the actual elapsed time. As an example, the youngest girl's birthday (Asahi) is given as being in April. According to the light novel, Yōtarō joins the girls on 25 December, therefore Asahi is ~9 months old. By the time the events of the OVA occur (in early summer), Asahi would be over a year old and the eldest daughter would actually be 20 years old.

Yōtarō Amatsuka (天使 陽太郎, Amatsuka Yōtarō)
Voiced by: Yūki Kaji
The main protagonist. He is about 15 years old and a first-year in high school. He is at first somewhat intimidated by the thought of living with his new sisters, but he is soon accepted by most of them. He is helpful and kind, but, not having grown up with the older girls, he cannot help "checking them out" from time to time.
Mama (ママ)
Voiced by: Natsuko Kuwatani
The head of the Amatsuka family. She is well-endowed and is strong-willed (one of her daughters comments that once her mind is made up she won't listen to anybody). She works as a theatrical agency CEO.
Miharu Amatsuka (天使 海晴, Amatsuka Miharu)
Voiced by: Rina Satō
The first daughter. She is 18 years old and has a job as a morning weather lady on a local TV station. When her mother is not at home, she takes on the role of head of the family. She often teases Yotaro.
Mizore Amatsuka (天使 霙, Amatsuka Mizore)
Voiced by: Yuka Saitō
The second daughter. She is 17 years old and a third-year in high school. She is level-headed and likes to tease her siblings. She is said to be fond of red bean paste. She has an interest in Yotaro and once said that she would not mind having him as her partner.
Haruka Amatsuka (天使 はるか, Amatsuka Haruka)
Voiced by: Yuko Goto
The third daughter. She is 16 years old and a second-year in high school. She is a good cook and likes "dependable men"; hence her adoration for Yōtarō, addressing him as "Prince-sama".
Hikaru Amatsuka (天使 ひかる, Amatsuka Hikaru)
Voiced by: Haruka Tomatsu
The fourth daughter. She is 15 years old and a first-year in high school. She tends to act very tomboyish and cool, even in ecchi moments. However, she does feel embarrassed if being treated kindly. It is revealed that she has honest feelings for Yōtarō.
Hotaru Amatsuka (天使 ほたる, Amatsuka Hotaru)
Voiced by: Aya Uchida
The fifth daughter. She is 14 years old and is a third-year in junior high school. She has a caring nature. Her hobby is cosplaying. She often fantasizes about Yotaro while saying "Hotaru is a bad girl."
Tsurara Amatsuka (天使 氷柱, Amatsuka Tsurara)
Voiced by: Saki Fujita
The sixth daughter. She is 13 years old and is a second-year in junior high school. She initially dislikes Yōtarō (calling him a manservant), but seems to develop feelings for him (with a tsundere attitude) after he rescues her. She is concerned about her small chest, often comparing herself to her sisters, especially Rikka, who wears a larger-sized bra even though she is younger.
Rikka Amatsuka (天使 立夏, Amatsuka Rikka)
Voiced by: Kanae Itō
The seventh daughter. She is 12 years old and is a first-year in junior high school. She has an outgoing and cheerful personality and has set her heart on Yōtarō. She also has a thing for makeup and dressing up.
Kosame Amatsuka (天使 小雨, Amatsuka Kosame)
Voiced by: Yuka Iguchi
The eighth daughter. She is 11 years old and is in sixth grade. She is rather timid.
Urara Amatsuka (天使 麗, Amatsuka Urara)
Voiced by: Mariya Ise
The ninth daughter. She is ten years old and is in fifth grade. Like Tsurara, she dislikes boys in general but starts to view Yotaro more kindly. She later develops a crush on him.
Seika Amatsuka (天使 星花, Amatsuka Seika)
Voiced by: Suzuko Mimori
The tenth daughter and middle child. She is nine years old and in fourth grade. She likes to wear Chinese-style clothes. She likes Yotaro and often attempts to sneak a kiss on him. She often bickers with Yuuna.
Yūna Amatsuka (天使 夕凪, Amatsuka Yūna)
Voiced by: Mai Hashimoto
The eleventh daughter. She is eight years old and in third grade. She likes magical girl shows and often is seen holding a magical wand. She also likes Yotaro and often attempts to sneak a kiss on him. She often bickers with Seika.
Fubuki Amatsuka (天使 吹雪, Amatsuka Fubuki)
Voiced by: Minori Chihara
The twelfth daughter. She is seven years old and is second grade. She is quite intelligent for her age and has a somewhat stoic personality. She is fond of Yotaro and often uses him to experiment what she learns from books or somewhere. She often makes sexual remarks with a straight face. She is often seen together with Watayuki.
Watayuki Amatsuka (天使 綿雪, Amatsuka Watayuki)
Voiced by: Hisako Kanemoto
The thirteenth daughter. She is six years old and in first grade. She has three pet ferrets. She adores Yotaro, calling him onii-chan and blushing when trying to get close to him. She is often seen together with Fubuki.
Mari Amatsuka (天使 真璃, Amatsuka Mari)
Voiced by: Aoi Yūki
The fourteenth daughter. She is five years old and is in the senior class of kindergarten. She acts rather haughty and likes to dress as a princess. She has a sadistic side and often teases Yotaro sexually.
Mizuki Amatsuka (天使 観月, Amatsuka Mizuki)
Voiced by: Kana Hanazawa
The fifteenth daughter. She is four years old and is in the middle class of kindergarten. She dresses like a miko and has a nine-tailed fox spirit as a pet. She speaks with a Kansai dialect. She adores and respects Yotaro, stating because he has a kindred aura.
Sakura Amatsuka (天使 さくら, Amatsuka Sakura)
Voiced by: Yoshino Nanjō
The sixteenth daughter. She is three years old and is in the junior class of kindergarten. She is rather timid and is slow when it comes to eating.
Nijiko Amatsuka (天使 虹子, Amatsuka Nijiko)
Voiced by: Yukika Teramoto
The seventeenth daughter. She is two years old and very cheerful. She likes to be praised by her older siblings and Yotaro.
Sora Amatsuka (天使 青空, Amatsuka Sora)
Voiced by: Iori Nomizu
The eighteenth daughter. She is one-year-old and has two pigtails.
Asahi Amatsuka (天使 あさひ, Amatsuka Asahi)
Voiced by: Asuka Ōgame
The nineteenth and youngest daughter. She is only several months old, but has already a mind of her own. She is very close to her oldest sister, Miharu.
