= Love Live! Nijigasaki High School Idol Club =

Japanese media franchise

- Anime promotional image featuring the 13 members of the Nijigasaki High School Idol Club. From front to back, left to right: Ayumu, Yu, Rina, Shioriko, Setsuna, Kasumi, Ai, Kanata, Lanzhu, Mia, Karin, Emma, Shizuku.

ラブライブ！虹ヶ咲学園スクールアイドル同好会 (Rabu Raibu! Nijigasaki Gakuen Sukūru Aidoru Dōkō-kai)
- Genre: Musical
- Created by: Hajime Yatate (story); Sakurako Kimino (concept)
- Anime television series
- Directed by: Tomoyuki Kawamura
- Written by: Jin Tanaka
- Music by: Naoki Endo
- Studio: Sunrise
- Licensed by: Crunchyroll (streaming); SEA: Odex; UK/IE: Anime Limited
- Original network: Tokyo MX, SUN, KBS, BS11, TVA, SATV, TVh, TVQ
- Original run: October 3, 2020 – June 25, 2022
- Episodes: 26
- Manga

Nijiyon: Love Live! Nijigasaki Gakuen School Idol Dōkōkai Yon-Koma
- Written by: Miyakohito
- Published by: ASCII Media Works
- Original run: 2018 – 2022
- Volumes: 2
- Anime television series

Nijiyon Animation
- Directed by: Yūya Horiuchi
- Music by: Naoki Endo
- Studio: Sunrise
- Licensed by: Crunchyroll
- Original network: Tokyo MX, BS11
- Original run: January 6, 2023 – June 21, 2024
- Episodes: 24 + 3 OVAs
- Original video animation

Love Live! Nijigasaki High School Idol Club Next Sky
- Directed by: Tomoyuki Kawamura
- Written by: Jin Tanaka
- Music by: Naoki Endo
- Studio: Sunrise
- Released: June 23, 2023
- Runtime: 30 minutes
- Anime film series

Love Live! Nijigasaki High School Idol Club Final Chapter
- Directed by: Tomoyuki Kawamura
- Written by: Jin Tanaka
- Music by: Naoki Endo
- Studio: Sunrise
- Licensed by: Crunchyroll
- Released: September 6, 2024 – February 5, 2027
- Films: 3
- Video game

Love Live! Nijigasaki High School Idol Club Tokimeki Roadmap to the Future
- Publisher: Bushiroad
- Genre: Visual novel
- Platform: Nintendo Switch
- Released: April 24, 2025

Love Live! Nijigasaki High School Idol Club (Note: Japanese: ラブライブ！虹ヶ咲学園スクールアイドル同好会, Hepburn: Rabu Raibu! Nijigasaki Gakuen Sukūru Aidoru Dōkō-kai; often abbreviated as Nijigaku or simply Nijigasaki) is a Japanese multimedia spin-off project from the Love Live! series and its game series Love Live! School Idol Festival. It was first introduced in 2017 as "Perfect Dream Project" and was initially created as part of the game Love Live! School Idol Festival All Stars. Unlike μ's and Aqours, the previous groups from the franchise, they are a group of individual school idols who compete with each other while working together to keep their school idol club alive. Together, they are referred as the Nijigasaki High School Idol Club. (Note: 虹ヶ咲学園スクールアイドル同好会, Nijigasaki Gakuen Sukūru Aidoru Dōkō-kai)

They are featured in the spin-off game Love Live! School Idol Festival All Stars along with μ's and Aqours. They also appear as SR rarity cards in Love Live! School Idol Festival. The girls were initially split up into groups of three to begin activities in three different apps before their addition to the game: Dengeki Online website (Kasumi, Karin, Setsuna), Famitsu App website (Ayumu, Ai, Rina), and the game's official website (Emma, Shizuku, Kanata). Each place is working as a separate room or branch office for the Nijigasaki High School. Later, they were officially split into three subunits: DiverDiva, A・Zu・Na, and Qu4rtz.

An anime television series adaptation by Sunrise aired from October to December 2020. A second season aired from April to June 2022. An anime television series adaptation of the spin-off manga Nijiyon: Love Live! Nijigasaki Gakuen School Idol Dōkōkai Yon-Koma, titled Nijiyon Animation, aired from January to March 2023. A second season aired from April to June 2024. An original video animation episode, Love Live! Nijigasaki High School Idol Club Next Sky, was released theatrically in Japan in June 2023. A trilogy of theatrical films will serve as the anime's finale; the first film was released in September 2024, the second film was released in November 2025, while the third film will be released in February 2027.

== Plot ==
Nijigasaki High School (虹ヶ咲学園, Nijigasaki Gakuen) is a large academy located in Odaiba, Tokyo. The school is popular for its free school style and diverse majors. The story centers on the members of the school idol club in Nijigasaki, who work together as solo idols and their attempt to prevent the club from being abolished. As the story progresses, more girls begin to participate in the club's activities.

== Characters ==
Where appropriate, plot descriptions mentioned below refer to the story in Love Live! School Idol Festival All Stars. Other parts of the franchise, such as the manga and animation series, feature some variations in the storyline.

=== Nijigasaki High School Idol Club ===
Top: Official group logo in Japanese
Bottom: Official group logo in English

Yu Takasaki (高咲 侑, Takasaki Yū)
Voiced by: Hinaki Yano (Japanese); Madeline Dorroh (English)
Yu is the anime equivalent of the Love Live! School Idol Festival All Stars' protagonist and a second year at Nijigasaki High School who is Ayumu's childhood friend and neighbor. She becomes infatuated with school idols after seeing Setsuna Yuki's performance and decides to join Nijigasaki's school idol club upon discovering that Setsuna is a student at their school, but chooses to be the group's manager rather than becoming a school idol herself. Her catchphrase is "I'm thrilled!" (ときめいた!) and "I can't choose just one!" (ヒトリダケナンテエラベナイヨー). Her charismatic and supportive nature easily attract others and make them interested in idols. Yu made her first in-game appearance in School Idol Festival 2 Miracle Live!.
Ayumu Uehara (上原 歩夢, Uehara Ayumu)
Voiced by: Aguri Ōnishi (Japanese); Suzie Yeung (English)
Ayumu is a second year who became a school at Yu's suggestion. She is hard-working and kind, but a little bit shy and insecure, and can be a little too dependent on Yu at times. Her image color is light pink.
Ayumu is described as a "hard-working type school idol" (コツコツ系スクールアイドル, kotsukotsu-kei sukūru aidoru).
Kasumi Nakasu (中須 かすみ, Nakasu Kasumi)
Voiced by: Mayu Sagara (Japanese); Kayli Mills (English)
Kasumi is a first year who refers to herself as "Kasumin." Due to her full name, she is often called "Kasukasu" as a joke, which she dislikes (as it means "dried out" in Japanese). She is incredibly passionate about her goal of becoming a school idol and can be mischievous towards her rivals, but is a good-hearted and friendly young girl despite her claiming to be mean. Her image color is yellow.
Kasumi is described as a "black-hearted type school idol" (腹黒系スクールアイドル, haraguro-kei sukūru aidoru).
Shizuku Osaka (桜坂 しずく, Ōsaka Shizuku)
Voiced by: Kaori Maeda (Japanese); Jill Harris (English)
Shizuku is one of the five original members of the school idol club, but unintentionally departed as she became more devoted to the theater club. She is one of the original N-rarity girls introduced in School Idol Festival. Shizuku is considered a yamato nadeshiko, and is very level-headed, kind, and mature. She comes from a wealthy and is an only child.
Shizuku is described as a "junior type school idol" (後輩系スクールアイドル, kōhai-kei sukūru aidoru).
Karin Asaka (朝香 果林, Asaka Karin)
Voiced by: Miyu Kubota (Japanese); Shara Kirby (English)
Karin is a third year student who aims to become a model and is very confident about her appearance. She has a passionate and mature personality, yet she also somewhat of a pure side, and can be quite clumsy. She is good at coordinating clothes.
She is described as a "sexy older sister type school idol" (セクシーお姉さん系スクールアイドル, sekushi onee-san-kei sukūru aidoru).
Karin is regarded as "2018 MVP" for ranking first-place for three consecutive months; taking only 2nd and 3rd in the other monthly polls.
Ai Miyashita (宮下 愛, Miyashita Ai)
Voiced by: Natsumi Murakami (Japanese); Daisy Guevara (English)
Ai is an energetic second year who is an honor student despite her gyaru appearance. She loves to make puns especially using her given name ("Ai" means "love" in Japanese) and refers to herself as "Ai-san." She joined the school idol club because she likes to try new things. She is usually kind and friendly, and quick to socialize. While she is intelligent, she is also quite goofy and has a rather childish sense. She is Rina's only friend at first, and her caring, supportive nature is shown when she helps her overcoming her social issues.
Ai is described as a "true gyaru type school idol" (ガチギャル系スクールアイドル, gachi gyaru-kei sukūru aidoru).
Kanata Konoe (近江 彼方, Konoe Kanata)
Voiced by: Akari Kitō (Japanese); Lindsay Seidel (English)
A third year who always looks sleepy, lazy and unmotivated, she belongs to the life design course. Kanata refers to herself as "Kanata-chan." She often looks sleepy because she studies hard to keep her scholarship. One of the original five school idol club members, she stopped coming to the club because she had to repair her exam scores; she agrees to return as Ayumu promised her that Shizuku and Ai would help her with her studies. She is one of the original N-rarity girls introduced in School Idol Festival; she is originally a Shinonome Institute student. She became a school idol to get motivation from her younger sister Haruka Konoe, also a school idol. In the anime, she is a selfless older sister who supports her Haruka and does house chores, though this results in a poor sleep schedule. She is also a good listener and counselor, helping Yu and Ayumu overcoming their issue of leaving each other to follow their dreams.
Kanata is described as a "spoiled older sister-type school idol" (甘えん坊お姉さん系スクールアイドル, amaenbō oneesan-kei sukūru aidoru).
Setsuna Yuki (優木 せつ菜, Yūki Setsuna) / Nana Nakagawa (中川 菜々, Nakagawa Nana)
Voiced by: Tomori Kusunoki (2017–2023), Coco Hayashi (2023–) (Japanese); Laura Stahl (English)
A second year who, for reasons, does not wear a school uniform nor had anyone seen her at the school. Setsuna is an otaku-type girl who liked singing. It is revealed that Setsuna Yuki is actually her stage name, with her real identity being Nana Nakagawa, Nijigasaki Academy's president of the student council. She is one of the original five school idol club members and had left because she was unable to tolerate its atmosphere due to her strong feelings towards school idols. This caused the club's failing state. Under her student council president disguise, she commands the protagonist to gather 10 members in order to keep the club alive. After 8 members (excluding the protagonist) gathered, she reveals herself to be Setsuna Yuki and rejoined the club.
Setsuna is described as a "Mysterious type school idol" (???系スクールアイドル, ???-kei sukūru aidoru), and once her true identity is revealed, she is shown to be a kind and charismatic person with a very passionate nature that makes others infectious. Setsuna is regarded as "2017 MVP" for ranking first-place three times out of the six monthly popularity polls held; she held second-place in the other polls.
Emma Verde (エマ・ヴェルデ, Ema Verude)
Voiced by: Maria Sashide (Japanese); Lisa Reimold (English)
A cheerful and good-natured third year exchange student who came abroad from Switzerland. Growing up there, she loves what nature brings, like mountains and forests. She belongs to the international exchange course. Emma is distinguishable by her twintail braids, freckles on her face and her well-endowed figure. Like Karin, she also models occasionally; the two are also friends and roommates, and Emma helps her at being more organized and orderly. Her favorite food is bread and she is able to eat a lot of slices, as well as mixing it with other food. Emma is one of the original N-rarity girls introduced in School Idol Festival as a student of Y.G. International Academy. She is one of the five original school idol club members; her absence from the club was simply because she went back to her home country for a while, leaving a letter that Kasumi misunderstood as a challenge letter from another school's club.
Emma is described as a "pure type school idol" (純粋系スクールアイドル, junsui-kei sukūru aidoru).
Rina Tennoji (天王寺 璃奈, Tennōji Rina)
Voiced by: Chiemi Tanaka (Japanese); Hayden Daviau (English)
A first-year student who claims to have a very cute face, but is too shy to show it; thus, she covers her face with the "Rina-chan board," a small notebook with a drawing on it of a facial expression she made with Ai. During live shows, she wears a cat eared pair of headphones with a small monitor that covers her face. She belongs to the information processing course, explaining her well-informed personality on technologies. In one of Rina's bond episodes of the game and anime series, she eventually decides to reveal her face to the protagonist; in All Stars, after reading this story, the player is also able to remove Rina's mask during live shows. She has difficulty expressing emotions and is shy, but she also has a kind and supportive nature, and is shown to work hard on her technologic gadgets to cure the technical side of the idol club.
Rina is described as a "face-hiding type school idol" (顔出しNG系スクールアイドル, kaodashi NG-kei sukūru aidoru).
Shioriko Mifune (三船 栞子, Mifune Shioriko)
Voiced by: Moeka Koizumi (Japanese); Caitlin Myers (English)
Shioriko is a smart and hard-working first-year student. She becomes the student council president, taking Nana Nakagawa's position, to abolish clubs she believes hold no educational merit for the school, including the school idol club. However, she eventually joins the school idol club herself. In August 2020, Shioriko joined the All Stars game's playable cast and Nijigasaki High School Idol Club as an official member, receiving a solo song, a 3D model, and cards obtainable within the games scouting boxes.
Her personality in the anime is completely different from the game. Although still diligent and serious, her anime counterpart is not aggressive and is shown to be kind and supportive towards the club even before she joins. She is also friends with Setsuna to begin with, and keeps her true identity secret when she discovers it.
Mia Taylor (ミア・テイラー, Mia Teirā)
Voiced by: Shu Uchida (Japanese); Lindsay Sheppard (English)
Mia is Lanzhu's friend, who was raised in New York. She is bilingual; she speaks Japanese and English. Unlike Lanzhu, Mia applies to Nijigasaki only because she was persuaded by Lanzhu. She is fairly, aloof, standoffish, and apathetic at first, but she gets on good terms with Yu and they help each other with musical compositions. Mia is a 14-year-old girl but, since she is a genius, skipped grades and is a third year student; she also helps the other members at studying. She is the youngest main character in the franchise history. She gets her solo song and a 3D model a while after her first appearance, but was only added as a playable character in September 2021.
Lanzhu Zhong (鐘 嵐珠, Shō Ranju)
Voiced by: Akina Homoto (Japanese); Courtney Lin (English)
Lanzhu is a second-year student and Shioriko's childhood friend. She was raised in Hong Kong. Her mother is the chairwoman of Nijigasaki High School. She is trilingual and speaks Japanese, Mandarin, and Cantonese. She applies to Nijigasaki to study together with Shioriko along with Mia. In All Stars, she got her own solo song as well as a 3D model a while after her first appearance, but was only added as playable character in September 2021. She is an arrogant and stuck up girl who has no empathy for others, but she will secretly would like to connect with others on an emotional level; in contrast, while still cockling, her portrayal in the anime is much soft.

=== Others ===
Haruka Konoe (近江 遥, Konoe Haruka)
Voiced by: Kaede Hondo
Haruka is Kanata's younger sister and a first year member of the Shinonome Institute Idol Club. Like her sister, she was originally one of the N-rarity girls introduced in School Idol Festival, but did not place in the top three of the popularity poll that determined which girls would be a part of the "Perfect Dream Project." In All Stars, she appears in her sister's bond episodes.
Misato Kawamoto (川本 美里, Kawamoto Misato)
Voiced by: Yui Ishikawa
Ai's "older sister whom she doesn't have blood connection with."
Kaoruko Mifune (三船 薫子, Mifune Kaoruko)
Voiced by: Yoko Hikasa
Kaoruko is Shioriko's older sister and a supporting character. She is considered as caring for her sister, but Shioriko tends to feel uncomfortable for unknown reasons. In the anime, Kaoruko is a university student who enters Nijigasaki Academy as the school's student teacher in the music course. She is a Shion Girls Academy graduate and used to be a school idol but did not make it to Love Live's qualifications.
Uzuki (右月) & Satsuki (左月)
Voiced by: Rico Sasaki (Uzuki) & Kana Ichinose (Satsuki)
A pair of twins who serve as the secretary of Nijigasaki High School's student council. In All Stars, both of them are revealed to be fans of the school idol club.

== Broadcast and distribution ==
Top: TV series logo (Japanese)
Bottom: TV series logo (English)

The anime television series is animated by Sunrise and directed by Tomoyuki Kawamura, with Jin Tanaka handling series composition and Takumi Yokota designing the characters. A public vote was held to decide the name of one of the anime's characters, Yu Takasaki, who is voiced by Hinaki Yano and based on the player character in the game. The 13-episode anime aired from October 3 to December 26, 2020, on Tokyo MX, SUN, and KBS, October 4 on BS11, and October 6 on region-exclusive channels. It was also streamed live through the Bandai Channel, Line Live, and YouTube Live. Odex licensed the anime in Southeast Asian territories excluding Thailand, where it is licensed by Dream Express (DEX). Funimation streamed the series in North America, and on AnimeLab in Australia and New Zealand. Nijigasaki High School Idol Club performed both the opening and ending themes, respectively titled "Nijiiro Passions!" (虹色Passions!) and "Neo Sky, Neo Map!".

During the group's 3rd live concert at the MetLife Dome on May 9, 2021, a second season was announced. The main cast and staff of the first season reprised their roles. It aired from April 2 to June 25, 2022. Nijigasaki High School Idol Club, now along with new members Shioriko, Mia, and Lanzhu, returns to perform both the opening and ending themes, titled "Colorful Dreams! Colorful Smiles!" and "Yume ga Bokura no Taiyō sa" (夢が僕らの太陽さ) respectively.

During the Love Live! Nijigasaki High School Idol Club 5th Live! Where Rainbows Bloom concert on September 18, 2022, an anime television series adaptation of the spin-off four-panel manga Nijiyon: Love Live! Nijigasaki Gakuen School Idol Dōkōkai Yon-Koma was announced. Titled Nijiyon Animation and directed by Yūya Horiuchi, it aired from January 6 to March 24, 2023, on Tokyo MX and BS11. The group, along with Yu Takasaki, sang the opening song titled "What You Gonna Do" (わちゅごなどぅー, Wachugonadu). During the "Love Live! Nijigasaki High School Idol Club 6th Live! I love You ⇆ You love Me" live concert, a second season was announced and it aired from April 5 to June 21, 2024.

During the live-streamed special for the Love Live! Nijigasaki High School Idol Club project on November 24, 2022, an original video animation episode for the main anime series was announced. Titled Love Live! Nijigasaki High School Idol Club Next Sky, the OVA premiered in Japanese theaters on June 23, 2023, with the main cast and staff from the series reprising their roles. On the same day as the OVA's release, a three-part series of animated theatrical films was announced, with the first film in the trilogy released on September 6, 2024. The main cast and staff from the series are once again reprising their roles, with the film series serving as the anime's finale. The second film was released on November 7, 2025. On October 30, 2025, Crunchyroll added the first film to their streaming service. The third film will be released on February 5, 2027.

== Other media ==
A visual novel, titled Tokimeki Roadmap to the Future and developed by HuneX, was released for Nintendo Switch and Steam on April 24, 2025.

== Music ==
Nijigasaki High School Idol Club initially debuted with a nine-member lineup in 2018, consisting of Ayumu, Kasumi, Shizuku, Karin, Ai, Kanata, Setsuna, Emma, and Rina. In 2020, Shioriko joined the group, while members Mia and Lanzhu would follow in 2021. Yu, who is a member of the club but not the idol group, also occasionally participates in group releases and events.

The first nine members of Nijigasaki High School Idol Club were split into three subunits of two, three, and four members. A fourth subunit featuring the last three members to join would later follow. These four subunits are: DiverDiva (Karin and Ai), A・Zu・Na (Ayumu, Shizuku, and Setsuna), Qu4rtz (pronounced "Quartz"; Kasumi, Kanata, Emma, and Rina), and R3birth (pronounced "Rebirth"; Shioriko, Mia, and Lanzhu).

== See also ==
- Mitsuboshi Colors – another anime series directed by Tomoyuki Kawamura
