= Hakoniwa Company Works =

2017 tactical role-playing game

- Japanese cover art
- Developer: Nippon Ichi Software
- Publisher: Nippon Ichi Software
- Director: Masayuki Furuya
- Artist: Masayuki Furuya
- Composers: Hajime Sugie; ZIZZ Studio
- Engine: Unreal Engine 4
- Platform: PlayStation 4
- Release: JP: July 13, 2017
- Genres: Tactical role-playing, sandbox
- Mode: Single-player

Hakoniwa Company Works (Japanese: ハコニワカンパニワークス, Hakoniwa Kanpani Wākusu) is a tactical role-playing game with elements of a sandbox game developed and published by Nippon Ichi Software. The game was released in Japan on July 13, 2017, for PlayStation 4. The theme song of the game is called "Hakoniwa Ambition" and is performed by Kaoru Hayano.

== Setting ==
Hakoniwa Company Works takes place in Cloud's End, a world where countless islands float in the sky. The protagonist becomes the leader of a company that connects the islands and takes on requests. The protagonist is supported by Meme Kazamidori, a cheerful girl who used to work for a famous company.

== Gameplay ==
In battle, players can use the destructible environment to their advantage with strategic positioning. Destroyed blocks can also give the player materials. By gathering materials, players can craft buildings, decorations and objects. Some of these objects, such as a furnace, can be used to create even more items. Players are able to power-up their characters by crafting and placing objects in the house the specific character lives in. Each single object can increase and decrease certain stats. Like in some other tactical role-playing games, characters employ five Jobs. The Boss job is for all-rounders. The Attacker class specializes in combat. The Rounder job focuses on supporting allies. The Bowler job specializes in map damage. The Carry job focuses on gathering materials. Skills can give players small advantages, for example by breaking blocks on the map or providing buffs. The game also features a "Drawing" system that allows players to create things as they want them to appear.

== Development ==
Originally teased on March 26, 2017, through a 50-second video on Nippon Ichi Software's YouTube channel, the game was fully revealed as Hakoniwa Company Works in the following issue of Dengeki PlayStation. Upon reveal, many fans made the comparison with Minecraft because of the voxel-based art style and the crafting gameplay shown in the teaser video. The game is the first game by Nippon Ichi Software known to be built in Unreal Engine. This was revealed through a splash screen at the beginning of a trailer for the game released by the publisher on June 23, 2017. According to Media Create, 4,586 copies of the game were sold in the week of its release, making it the eleventh best-selling game of the week.
