= Love Live! Sunshine!! =

Japanese multimedia project

- Promotional image featuring the main characters of Love Live! Sunshine!!. Left-to-right, from top: Mari, Yoshiko, Kanan, Dia, Ruby, Hanamaru, You, Chika, and Riko.

ラブライブ! サンシャイン!! (Rabu Raibu! Sanshain!!)
- Genre: Musical
- Created by: Hajime Yatate (story); Sakurako Kimino (concept)
- Manga
- Written by: Sakurako Kimino
- Illustrated by: Masaru Oda
- Published by: ASCII Media Works
- English publisher: MY: Kadokawa Gempak Starz
- Magazine: Dengeki G's Magazine
- Original run: May 2016 – present
- Volumes: 3
- Anime television series
- Directed by: Kazuo Sakai
- Produced by: Tadashi Hirayama; Yūki Makimoto
- Written by: Jukki Hanada
- Music by: Tatsuya Kato
- Studio: Sunrise
- Licensed by: Crunchyroll (streaming); AUS: Madman Entertainment; SEA: Mighty Media; UK: Anime Limited
- Original network: Tokyo MX, SUN, KBS, BS11, TVA, SBS, TVh, TVQ
- Original run: July 2, 2016 – December 30, 2017
- Episodes: 26
- Anime film

Love Live! Sunshine!! The School Idol Movie: Over the Rainbow
- Directed by: Kazuo Sakai
- Written by: Jukki Hanada
- Music by: Tatsuya Kato
- Studio: Sunrise
- Licensed by: Crunchyroll (streaming); AUS: Madman Entertainment
- Released: January 4, 2019
- Runtime: 100 minutes
- icon

Love Live! Sunshine!! (ラブライブ! サンシャイン!!, Rabu Raibu! Sanshain!!) is a Japanese multimedia project co-developed by ASCII Media Works' Dengeki G's Magazine, music label Lantis, and animation studio Sunrise. The project is the second series of the Love Live! franchise and is a spin-off sequel of Love Live! School Idol Project. The story of this project revolves around a new group of nine schoolgirls who become idols in order to save their school from shutting down. It launched in April 2015 with music CDs and anime music videos, followed by a manga version in 2016.

An anime television series was directed by Kazuo Sakai at Sunrise; the first season aired between July and September 2016 while the second season aired between October and December 2017. An anime film titled Love Live! Sunshine!! The School Idol Movie: Over the Rainbow was released on January 4, 2019, in Japanese theaters.

An anime spin-off television series titled Yohane the Parhelion: Sunshine in the Mirror premiered in June 2023.

== Plot ==
Love Live! Sunshine!! is set in Uchiura, Numazu, Shizuoka where one of its schools, the seaside Uranohoshi Girls' Academy, is planned to be shut down and merged with another school in Numazu. Chika Takami, a girl who lacks desires, is inspired by μ's (pronounced "muse") to gather friends and form her own school idol group called Aqours (アクア, Akua; pronounced "aqua"). To prevent their school from shutting down, Aqours enters the Love Live school idol contest which has become more competitive since μ's won.

== Characters ==
Where appropriate, plot descriptions mentioned below refer to the anime television series. Other parts of the franchise, such as the manga and novel series, feature some variations in the storyline.

=== Aqours ===
Group logo

Chika Takami (高海 千歌, Takami Chika)
Voiced by: Anju Inami (Japanese); Jad Saxton (English)
Chika is a second-year student at Uranohoshi Girls' Academy. She always believed herself to be too ordinary, but after learning that the members of μ's managed to become school idols despite also being normal students, becomes inspired to form a school idol group. Her determination is compounded when her school faces potential consolidation with another school (with Uranohoshi's students moving to another campus), similarly to how μ's formed when their school was at risk of shutting down. Chika is the youngest among three daughters, and her family runs a traditional inn known for its open-air hot springs with an ocean view. She acts as Aqours' leader and primary lyricist.
Riko Sakurauchi (桜内 梨子, Sakurauchi Riko)
Voiced by: Rikako Aida (Japanese); Jeannie Tirado (English)
Riko is a kind, polite, and modest second-year student at Uranohoshi Girls' Academy. She previously attended μ's' school, Otonokizaka Academy in Akihabara, but was unaware of the group before becoming a school idol herself. She is a talented pianist, but worried that she had stopped improving, and moved to Numazu to take inspiration from the sea. She is also a capable violist. She has a fear of dogs, but eventually conquers it and adopts a puppy named Prelude by the end of the series. She also harbors an interest in various shōjo and yuri manga, often buying collections on her brief returns to Tokyo. After joining Aqours, she becomes the composer of the group.
Kanan Matsuura (松浦 果南, Matsuura Kanan)
Voiced by: Nanaka Suwa (Japanese); Michelle Rojas (English)
Kanan is a third-year student and Chika and You's childhood friend. Kanan lives with her grandfather on a nearby island where they run a diving gear shop. She, Dia, and Mari formed a school idol group as first years, but Kanan feigned stage fright during a concert to discourage Mari, who had sprained her leg, from performing. Kanan is the most athletic member of the group and acts as their main choreographer.
Dia Kurosawa (黒澤 ダイヤ, Kurosawa Daiya)
Voiced by: Arisa Komiya (Japanese); Morgan Lauré Garrett (English)
Dia is the prideful third-year student council president at Uranohoshi Girls' Academy. She and her younger sister Ruby are part of a well-known and respected family. Dia is also an avid fan of μ's, but kept her enthusiasm for school idols an secret after she, Kanan, and Mari separated, until she was convinced to join Aqours by Chika and the others. She named her, Kanan, and Mari's group "Aqours," inadvertently leading Chika to do the same after writing the name into the sand with a stick. Despite being strict, mature, and responsible, she harbors a secret immature side and genuinely cares for the other members. She often scolds them with her catchphrase "Bubbū desu wa!" (ブッブーですわ!), the Japanese onomatopoeia for an incorrect buzzer.
You Watanabe (渡辺 曜, Watanabe Yō)
Voiced by: Shuka Saitō (Japanese); Apphia Yu (English)
You is an energetic second-year student who is Chika and Kanan's childhood friend. She aims to become a ship captain one day like her father. Her catchphrase is "Yōsorō!" (ヨーソロー!; (Keep her) steady!). She loves uniforms, idol costumes or work-related uniforms alike, and is thusly is the main costume coordinator of the group.
Yoshiko Tsushima (津島 善子, Tsushima Yoshiko)
Voiced by: Aika Kobayashi (Japanese); Morgan Berry (English)
Yoshiko is a first-year with a chūnibyō persona, which she adopted because she felt like she was too ordinary. She claims that she became a fallen angel for angering God, and refers to herself as "Yohane" (ヨハネ), along with demanding everyone else call her that (though they seldom do, to her chagrin). After the other members of Aqours assure her that they accept her chūnibyō persona, she joins the group.
Hanamaru Kunikida (国木田 花丸, Kunikida Hanamaru)
Voiced by: Kanako Takatsuki (Japanese); Megan Shipman (English)
Hanamaru is a hardworking first-year student whose family runs a local temple. As her home lacks several modern-age utilities, such as computers, she becomes enamored by modern technology. She refers to herself as either "ora" or "Maru", and ends many of her sentences with "-zura" because of her Shizuoka dialect. She is also a member of a local choir and an avid reader at the school's library. She and Yoshiko were friends in kindergarten, and Yoshiko calls her "Zuramaru."
Mari Ohara (小原 鞠莉, Ohara Mari)
Voiced by: Aina Suzuki (Japanese); Jamie Marchi (English)
Mari is a third-year student at Uranohoshi and the wealthy daughter to an Italian-American father and Japanese mother. Her family runs a hotel chain, and she lives in one of their hotels. Mari has an American accent and often combines English and Japanese (Italian in the English dub) in her speech. Mari was appointed as Uranohoshi's chairwoman despite simultaneously being a student due to her family being one of the school's main sponsors. She is childhood friends with Dia and Kanan, and previously formed an idol unit with them, though it disbanded early due to Kanan and Dia deliberately sabotaging a performance to encourage Mari to pursue a scholarship she earned at a school overseas. Her catchphrase is "Shiny!" (シャイニー, Shainī), which she tends to exclaim whenever she gets excited.
Ruby Kurosawa (黒澤 ルビィ, Kurosawa Rubii)
Voiced by: Ai Furihata (Japanese); Sarah Wiedenheft (English)
Ruby is a first-year student at Uranohoshi Girls' Academy. She is Dia's shy, timid younger sister and Hanamaru's best friend, who has dreamed of becoming an idol for a long time. She is the youngest member of Aqours and suffers from social anxiety to the point of panicking when she is touched or complimented by anyone she is not used to, being only comfortable around Dia and Hanamaru at the start of the anime. Through Aqours, she learns to become more confident and outgoing. Her catchphrase is "Ganbaruby!" (がんばルビィ), a portmanteau of her name with the Japanese verb "ganbaru," meaning to try hard or persevere; in the English dub, this is translated as "Do my Rubesty!"

=== Saint Snow ===
An idol unit from Hakodate, Hokkaido, which serves as Aqours' rival. Despite being rivals, they are on friendly terms with Aqours.

Sarah Kazuno (鹿角 聖良, Kazuno Seira)
Voiced by: Asami Tano (Japanese); Trina Nishimura (English)
One of the members of the idol duo Saint Snow, a rival of Aqours.
Leah Kazuno (鹿角 理亞, Kazuno Ria)
Voiced by: Hinata Satō (Japanese); Amber Lee Connors (English)
Sarah's sister and partner in Saint Snow. She and her sister were inspired by A-Rise to become school idols in a similar fashion that the members of Aqours are inspired by μ's.

=== Others ===
Shima Takami (高海 志満, Takami Shima)
Voiced by: Kana Asumi (Japanese); Colleen Clinkenbeard (English)
Chika's eldest sister and the eldest of the Takami family.
Mito Takami (高海 美渡, Takami Mito)
Voiced by: Kanae Itō (Japanese); Monica Rial (English)
Chika's older sister and the middle child of Takami family.

== Media ==
=== Print ===
A manga titled Love Live! Sunshine!!, written by Sakurako Kimino and illustrated by Masaru Oda, began serialization in the May 2016 issue of Dengeki G's Magazine. The first tankōbon volume was released on September 27, 2016; three volumes have been released as of March 27, 2018. The manga is published in English in Malaysia by Kadokawa Gempak Starz.

A 160-page fanbook of Aqours, titled Love Live! Sunshine!! First Fan Book, was released on June 30, 2016. The book was published by ASCII Media Works and contains an introduction of Aqours' members, original manga written by Sakurako Kimino, and a newly drawn cover by Yuhei Murota.

=== Anime ===
A 13-episode anime television series produced by Sunrise, directed by Kazuo Sakai, and written by Jukki Hanada aired between July 2 and September 24, 2016, and was simulcast by Crunchyroll. The series is licensed in North America by Funimation, in the United Kingdom by Anime Limited, and in Australia by Madman Entertainment. An English dub by Funimation began streaming from July 30, 2016. The opening and ending themes are "Aozora Jumping Heart" (青空Jumping Heart) and "Yume Kataru Yori Yume Utaou" (ユメ語るよりユメ歌おう) respectively, both performed by Aqours. Every week while the anime was airing, Bandai Visual released merchandise called "memorial items" inspired by an item in each episode only available for a limited time. A second season aired between October 7 and December 30, 2017. The opening and ending themes respectively are "Mirai no Bokura wa Shitteru yo" (未来の僕らは知ってるよ, Our Future Selves Know) and "Yūki wa Doko ni? Kimi no Mune ni!" (勇気はどこに？君の胸に！, Where is Courage? In Your Heart!), both performed by Aqours. "Aozora Jumping Heart" is used as the opening theme for the final episode. The second season was 2018's best-selling animated series on DVD and Blu-ray in Japan, with 330,102 sales. An anime film titled Love Live! Sunshine!! The School Idol Movie: Over the Rainbow was released on January 4, 2019, in Japan. An English dub of the film was released on February 25, 2020. The main staff and cast return to reprise their roles for the film.

An anime fantasy spin-off television series titled Yohane of the Parhelion: Sunshine in the Mirror (幻日のヨハネ, Genjitsu no Yohane) was announced on June 26, 2022. Originally a set of fantasy illustrations appearing in Love Live! Days and featuring Yoshiko as the main character as the name suggests, an anime adaptation was previously announced as an April Fool's 2022 joke before it became official in June. The series is produced by Bandai Namco Filmworks and directed by Asami Nakatani and written by Toshiya Ono, with Yumiko Yamamoto designing the characters, and Tatsuya Katō returning to compose the music. It premiered early on Abema on June 25, and it premiered on July 2, 2023, on Tokyo MX and other networks. The opening theme is "Genjitsu Mysterium" (幻日ミステリウム) by Aqours.

=== Video games ===
In January 2016, Love Live! Sunshine!! live streamed a special announcement regarding Aqours joining the Love Live! School Idol Festival rhythm game app starting in July 2016. In the game, the Aqours idols get their own stories, new songs, and cards. KLab also added R rarity cards for each Aqours member, even though they were only voiced after July. In June 2016, Chika and Riko were featured in the in-game regular events for the first time. A spin-off game which includes Aqours, Love Live! School Idol Festival All Stars, released in September 2019.

In 2017, Hanamaru Kunikida succeeded Rin Hoshizora as the face of Puyo Puyo. Along with μ's, Aqours appears in a game based on the "nesoberi" stuffed dolls sold resembling the characters titled Puchiguru Love Live!. It was released on April 24, 2018, for Android and iOS, and was shut down on May 31, 2019.

Between August 9–21, 2018, all of the members of Aqours appeared in the mobile RPG Granblue Fantasy as a collaboration event titled Love Live! Sunshine!! Aqours Sky High! (ラブライブ！サンシャイン!! Aqours スカイハイ！). The characters are divided into three teams based on their school year. Second-year students (Chika, Riko, You) are obtainable through the event story, while first-years (Hanamaru, Yoshiko, Ruby) and third-year students (Dia, Kanan, Mari) are obtainable by trading material obtainable in-game.

A side-scrolling action game titled Yohane the Parhelion: Blaze in the Deepblue (幻日のヨハネ -BLAZE in the DEEPBLUE-) was announced in June 2023 and is currently in development by Inti Creates. It was released in Japan on November 16, 2023, for PlayStation 4, PlayStation 5, Xbox One, Xbox Series X/S, Nintendo Switch, and Windows.

=== Music ===
The nine members of Aqours are grouped into three subunits: CYaRon! (Chika, You and Ruby), Azalea (stylized in all-caps; Kanan, Dia and Hanamaru), and Guilty Kiss (Riko, Yoshiko and Mari). Seven of Aqours' singles include an anime music video, while two others include a live-action music video featuring the members' voice actresses.

Saint Snow has their own singles, as well as one music video. Some songs are included in Aqours' own singles and albums, while others have their own standalone releases. Aqours and Saint Snow also have a joint idol group named Saint Aqours Snow.

== Reception ==
Nick Creamer from Anime News Network reviewed the first season in 2018. He was critical of the overall plot reusing story elements from the original series but said it was utilized very well in making its "genuinely imperfect" main cast relatable and having a more "emotionally resonant" adventure than its predecessor. Creamer wrote that director Kazuo Sakai did an admirable job maintaining the series' visual comedy previously helmed by Takahiko Kyōgoku, giving each character a distinct and expressive trait from one another and improved the CG dance models and scenes to be more eye-pleasing and presentable than before, concluding that: "Simultaneously too similar and extremely different, suffering many of the same failings but rising to its own dramatic heights, Sunshine is ultimately a rewarding show and a fine followup for the Love Live! franchise."
