= Love Live! School Idol Festival =

2013 video game

- Genres: Rhythm game; Adventure
- Developer: KLabGames
- Publisher: Bushiroad
- Composer: KLab Sound Team
- Platforms: Android; iOS / iPadOS; Arcade; PlayStation 4; (PlayStation 5 through backward compatibility)
- Original release: JPN: April 15, 2013 – March 31, 2023 (9 years, 11 months, 2 weeks and 2 days); WW: May 12, 2014 – March 31, 2023 (8 years, 10 months, 2 weeks and 5 days); KR: July 1, 2014 – August 10, 2016 (2 years, 1 month, 1 week and 2 days); TW: May 22, 2014 – May 17, 2017 (2 years, 11 months, 3 weeks and 4 days); CHN: July 12, 2014 – March 31, 2023 (8 years, 8 months, 2 weeks and 5 days)
- First release: Love Live! School Idol Festival; April 15, 2013
- Latest release: Love Live! School Idol Festival All Stars; September 26, 2019
- Parent series: Love Live!

Love Live! School Idol Festival
- Developer: KLabGames
- Publisher: Bushiroad
- Composer: KLab Sound Team
- Engine: Playground
- Platforms: Android; iOS / iPadOS
- Release: JPN: April 15, 2013 – March 31, 2023 (9 years, 11 months, 2 weeks and 2 days); WW: May 12, 2014 – March 31, 2023 (8 years, 10 months, 2 weeks and 5 days); KR: July 1, 2014 – August 10, 2016 (2 years, 1 month, 1 week and 2 days); TW: May 22, 2014 – May 17, 2017 (2 years, 11 months, 3 weeks and 4 days); CHN: July 12, 2014 – March 31, 2023 (8 years, 8 months, 2 weeks and 5 days)
- Genres: Rhythm game; Adventure
- Modes: Single-player; Multiplayer (during events)

Love Live! School Idol Festival (Note: Japanese: ラブライブ! スクールアイドルフェスティバル, Hepburn: Rabu Raibu! Sukūru Aidoru Fesutibaru; stylised as Love Live! School idol festival) (often abbreviated as LLSIF or Sukufesu) is a Japanese rhythm game series. The first game, developed by KLab and published by Bushiroad's Bushimo, was released in Japan on April 15, 2013, for iOS and June 8, 2013, for Android. The game was free-to-play with an in-app purchase system. It featured songs and characters from the series Love Live! School Idol Project and Love Live! Sunshine!!, newly introduced girls, and stories that were not included in other media in the Love Live! franchise.

The English localization was released worldwide on May 11, 2014, for iOS and Android devices. It was also localized in China, Hong Kong, Macau, Taiwan, and South Korea. At the end of September 2016, the English version added Korean support, and the two servers merged. The Traditional Chinese version, which was operated by Mobimon in Taiwan, Hong Kong, and Macau, also merged with the English version on May 18, 2017. In February 2021 it was announced that the worldwide server would be merging with the Japanese server, which was completed in June 2021. The changes included the removal of Korean and Traditional Chinese language from the server.

On January 11, 2016, the cast of Love Live! Sunshine!! live streamed a special announcement regarding Aqours' members joining the app in July 2016. In the game, Aqours received original main and side stories, playable songs, and fully voiced cards. KLab added R rarity cards for each Aqours members on January 31, 2016, though they were only voiced after the official release in July. In June 2016, two Aqours members, Chika and Riko, were featured in an event for the first time. The group officially joined the game on July 5, 2016, along with a new card rarity and other major updates.

An arcade version of the game titled Love Live! School Idol Festival: After School Activity (developed and published by Square Enix) was released on December 6, 2016, in Japan, and a PlayStation 4 port was released in North America, Japan, and Southeast Asia on March 24, 2021. Another spin-off game titled Love Live! School Idol Festival All Stars was released in Japan on September 26, 2019, and worldwide on February 25, 2020. It starred the girls from Love Live! Nijigasaki High School Idol Club, with μ's and Aqours also prominently featured in the game. All Stars' game service was shut down on June 30, 2023.

A sequel to the original game titled Love Live! School Idol Festival 2: Miracle Live! (officially abbreviated as SIF2) was announced at the franchise's 2022 thanksgiving festival. Along with previous groups—μ's, Aqours, and Nijigasaki High School Idol Club—Liella! also made their appearance. The global version was released on February 1, 2024.

Love Live! School Idol Festival's game service was shut down on March 31, 2023, and was succeeded by SIF2 which itself was shut down on March 31, 2024, in Japan and on May 31 globally.

== Gameplay ==
During "Live Show," the player had to tap the icons with the rhythm of the song.

The game had two gameplay modes—"Story" and "Live"— which featured all nine members of the idol groups μ's and Aqours. (Note: μ's – pronounced "Muse" Aqours – pronounced as "Aqua") Players acquired a score in the rhythm "Live" mode, in which they could tap circles at the proper time in order to receive a high score that can be placed on the leader board. These songs were divided into 4 difficulties: Easy, Normal, Hard, and Expert. Another difficulty called "Master" was added, and included rhythm icons where players had to swipe their fingers on the screen during some songs.

In "Story" mode, the player worked as μ's' and Aqours' helper and managed their training and schedule. The mode was full-voiced with all of the idols' respective voice actresses. The players interacted with the girls as they lived their lives as school idols.

The game had several currencies:

- LP: Stamina necessary for doing a Live. One song could use up to 25 LP depending on the song's difficulty. LP could be refilled by using one Love Gem, by using "Sugar Cubes" and "Sugar Pots" obtained via Special Rewards, by waiting for it to be refilled (1LP per 6 minutes), or by raising the account level or "Rank". Every 2 ranks, the player's maximum LP increased by one point. When the player reached rank 300, their maximum LP would take 3 ranks to increase by one point instead of 2. Refilling the LP or leveling up would cause the LP to be overflowed, which meant that players may sometimes end up with more LP than their account would normally be able to have.
- Gs: The app's in-game currency, Gs could be used for leveling up or idolizing an idol, or buying temporary stat increases during some events.
- Friend points: Points that could be acquired by having other players help during a Live. Friend points could be used to scout N, SSR and R rarity cards.
- Love Gems: The app's in-game currency which could be bought through in-app purchase. It could be used for refilling the entire LP bar, member scouting (gacha pull), or continuing a failed Live.
- Scouting Ticket: Besides Love Gems, the other way to scout a rare member through the "Honor Scouting" system was by using a scouting ticket. There were three types of tickets: green regular tickets, blue scouting coupons, and purchased scouting tickets that guaranteed cards of a certain rarity.
- Stickers: If an R, SR, SSR, or UR rarity card was used for practice or deleted, the player would gain a sticker. These stickers could be used for idolizing a card or purchasing other cards or scouting coupons from the Sticker Shop. Stickers' rarity were divided into 4 types that depended on the rarity of the used cards. Cards that didn't feature the girls from either μ's or Aqours, and promotional and skill cards wouldn't give stickers.

=== Cards and team formation ===
Players could form 9-person units. The girls in the formation were called "members". Players acquired new members by doing Lives or scouting through "Student Scouting" that used the gacha system. Two same cards could be combined and they would be "Idolized", which unlocked new card art and a side story gave a Love Gem. Each member had their own card level and skill that could be leveled up by doing a "Practice", which involved sacrificing one or more cards to increase the level of another one. In order to increase skill level, cards that were "practiced" had to have the same skill. Increasing skill and card levels improved the scores players could obtain in "Lives". New Aqours and regular members were added every time an in-game event has ended and μ's cards are added halfway through events.

Members cards were divided into 5 rarities: N (normal), R (rare), SR (super rare), SSR (special super rare), and UR (ultra rare). Each rarity (except N-rarity) had a different set of leader skills (passive) and active skills that affect the Lives scores. Cards and songs were divided into attributes that represent each card's idol type: Smile, Cool, and Pure. Using the same attribute members to do Lives of the same attribute song gave a higher score.

The original characters added in the game were featured in the N-rarity cards. There were 54 characters with 9 girls represent 6 different schools:

Seiran High School

- Shizuku Ōsaka
- Marika Ichinose (一之瀬 マリカ, Ichinose Marika)
- Minami Nagayama (永山 みなみ, Nagayama Minami)
- Aya Sugisaki (杉崎 亜矢, Sugisaki Aya)
- Ayumi Torii (鳥居 歩美, Torii Ayumi)
- Seira Kujō (九条 聖来, Kujō Seira)
- Sachiko Tanaka (田中 さち子, Tanaka Sachiko)
- Akira Shinomiya (篠宮 あきる, Shinomiya Akira)
- Yumi Fujishiro (藤城 悠弓, Fujishiro Yumi)

Chitose Bridge High School

- Yū Aizawa (逢沢 遊宇, Aizawa Yū)
- Fumie Nishimura (西村 文絵, Nishimura Fumie)
- Akemi Kikuchi (菊池 朱美, Kikuchi Akemi)
- Iruka Suda (須田 いるか, Suda Iruka)
- Reina Saeki (佐伯 麗音, Saeki Reina)
- Nanaka Morishima (森嶋 ななか, Morishima Nanaka)
- Saki Shimozono (下園 咲, Shimozono Saki)
- Rū Tatara (多々良 るう, Tatara Rū)
- Nagi Shiraki (白木 凪, Shiraki Nagi)

Shinonome Academy

- Coco Miyashita (宮下 ココ, Miyashita Koko)
- Sana Yūki (結城 紗菜, Yūki Sana)
- Christina (クリスティーナ, Kurisutīna)
- Yuri Midō (御堂 優理, Midō Yuri)
- Rika Kamiya (神谷 理華, Kamiya Rika)
- Kanata Konoe
- Haruka Konoe (近江 遥, Konoe Haruka)
- Kasane Hasekura (支倉 かさね, Hasekura Kasane)
- Mizuki Sakkiwa (吉川 瑞希, Sakkiwa Mizuki)

Touou Academy

- Shun Kurosaki (黒崎 隼, Kurosaki Shun)
- Fumi Shitara (設楽 ふみ, Shitara Fumi)
- Tsurugi Kadota (門田 剣, Kadota Tsurugi)
- Yūki Kirihara (桐原 優香, Kirihara Yūki)
- Fū Saiki (斉木 風, Saiki Fū)
- Misaki Shidō (紫藤 美咲, Shidō Misaki)
- Himeno Ayanokōji (綾小路 姫乃, Ayanokōji Himeno)
- Koyuki Shirase (白瀬 小雪, Shirase Koyuki)
- Ryō Aikawa (相川 涼, Aikawa Ryō)

Shion Girls' Academy

- Chizuko Sakamaki (坂巻 千鶴子, Sakamaki Chizuko)
- Hitomi Shiga (志賀 仁美, Shiga Hiromi)
- Mikoto Fukuhara (福原 命, Fukuhara Mikoto)
- Akira Kizaki (鬼崎 アキラ, Kizaki Akira)
- Yuka Tsukishima (月島 結架, Tsukishima Yuka)
- Sayuri Hyōdō (兵藤 さゆり, Hyōdō Sayuri)
- Sakura Kurobane (黒羽 咲良, Kurobane Sakura)
- Sakuya Kurobane (黒羽 咲夜, Kurobane Sakuya)
- Mutsuki Takamagahara (高天原 睦月, Takamagahara Mutsuki)

Y.G. International Academy

- Ranpha (蘭花, Ranfa)
- Rakshata (ラクシャータ, Rakushāta)
- Rebecca (レベッカ, Rebekka)
- Isabella (イザベラ, Isabera)
- Emma Verde
- Jennifer (ジェニファー, Jenifā)
- Maria (マリア)
- Leo (レオ, Reo)
- Yukari Saotome (早乙女 紫, Saotome Yukari)

These characters were not voiced, but Emma Verde (previously only named Emma), Kanata Konoe, and Shizuku Osaka were promoted to become part of the Nijigasaki High School Idol Club and were each given voice actresses. Fujimaru designed the new characters.

Besides the regular cards, the game also included "promotional cards" and "skill up cards". Promotional cards could be obtained free as a bonus from purchasing Love Live! merchandise, clearing quests, purchasing through Sticker Shop, scouting using Gs, or simply logging in to the game. Regardless of rarity, promotional cards had relatively low stats and leader skill effects. They also didn't give stickers when practiced or deleted. The cards were usually pre-idolized, which meant that players could not idolize the card for different art. μ's and Aqours' respective rival groups (A-Rise and Saint Snow), the groups' younger selves, (Note: Added as part of the game's 2018 April's Fools event) and the girls from Nijigasaki High School are also featured as fully voiced promotional cards.

A skill up card was used to level up the skill of a card. It couldn't be idolized or used in a Live. These cards featured characters around the main groups such as the girls' mothers, school friends and teachers, and even animals. These cards could be obtained by logging in, special box scouting, in-game event rewards, or purchasing a limited time sale pack.

=== In-game events ===
Every 15 days, an in-game event with a total of 1 UR rarity card as a reward was held. (Note: 2 cards before Chika and Riko's first included event in June 2016) Each event ran for around 10 days with a 5-days break. The UR rarity card was obtainable by collecting event points and competing with other players through event points ranking. Reward included Gs, Love Gems, and skill-up cards.

The game had 6 type of events:

Token Collection (アイコンコレクション, Aikon Korekushon)
Players played an event-exclusive song to get the event points. The song required Tokens which are collected by playing songs. Sometimes, the event also featured a short story that was previously featured in the franchise's novel series School Idol Diary.
Score Match (スコアマッチ, Sukoa Macchi)
4 players competed with each other to get the highest score from a randomly-chosen song.
Medley Festival (メドレーフェスティバル, Medorē Fesutibaru)
Players could play up to three songs in a row and could use stat increases to improve their score and/or Live prize. Some stat increases would appear randomly from in-game friends.
Challenge Festival (チャレンジフェスティバル, Charenji Fesutibaru)
Players could play up to 5 songs and receive the accumulated prize at the end of the challenge. μ's members would appear and give random ability increases. If 3 members with same sub-unit, school year, and/or wear same uniform appeared, a specific mission would appear. Clearing the mission would give the players an additional prize.
Adventure Stroll (おさんぽラリー, Osanpo Rarī)
Players cleared Live songs to unlock Aqours and μ's side stories and cleared missions while "taking a stroll" around the event map. Live songs also gave 'souvenirs' which players could exchange for friend points, event SR rarity cards, and in-game backgrounds.
Companion Match (なかよしマッチ, Nakayoshi Macchi)
Worked like Score Match, but instead of competing against each other, the event required 4 players to work together in clearing missions by reaching certain scores or combos. Players' scores were determined by how much they contributed. While in score mission they were ranked from highest to the lowest score, combo mission would always display anyone with "Full Combo" as the first place(s).

=== Collaboration event ===
In 2019, the Japanese server of School Idol Festival held its first collaboration event outside the Love Live! franchise. The collaboration event with mobile TCG, Shadowverse, was held in both of the games (September 20–30 within the School Idol Festival app). Between the 9 girls of Aqours, Yoshiko Tsushima was chosen as representative through fan votes. The collaboration campaign includes a new song, "Deep Resonance" that was included in the group's 4th single, collaboration SSR cards of the group, a limited UR card for Yoshiko, as well as login bonuses.

A Code Geass x School Idol Festival collaboration event was announced in March 2022 as a part of the game's 9th anniversary campaign. Event reward included UR card Chika Takami in Ashford Academy uniform.

=== Service termination ===
On January 31, 2023, the SIF Japanese server, worldwide server, and simplified Chinese server officially announced the end of game service on March 31, 2023. The game was succeeded by Love Live! School Idol Festival 2: Miracle Live!.

== Love Live! School Idol Festival 2: Miracle Live! ==
Love Live! School Idol Festival 2: Miracle Live!
- Developer: Bushiroad
- Publisher: Bushiroad
- Engine: Unity
- Platforms: Android; iOS / iPadOS
- Release: JP: April 15, 2023 – March 31, 2024; WW: February 1, 2024 – May 31, 2024
- Genre: Rhythm game
- Modes: Single-player; Multiplayer (During events)

The successor to School Idol Festival was announced at the franchise's 2022 thanksgiving festival. Along with previous groups—μ's, Aqours, and Nijigasaki High School Idol Club—Liella! also made their appearance. Players of LLSIF were able to transfer their account data in the game to SIF2. The data transfer retains players' obtained cards in an album feature.

In the game, players assumed the role of a student belonging to the newspaper club at their school. The player could choose among the main groups to do their interview about school idols with. Although not playable, Yu Takasaki, the protagonist of Love Live! Nijigasaki High School Idol Club, also makes her appearance.

Besides the main groups, songs from groups and school idols under the Love Live! franchise, like A-Rise, Saint Snow, Sunny Passion, Wien Margarete, as well as songs from Hasunosora Girls School Idol Club (Note: The "virtual school idol project" that will begin their activities in April 2023 with an early access release of Link! Like! Love Live! two days after the game's release on April 17, 2023.) and School Idol Musical were also included.

Liella! performs the opening theme song titled "Miracle New Story."

The rhythm gameplay from the previous game was back with a renewed UI. New features included a character/group chat system, in which a player could unlock conversations by deepening their bond with the characters.

The Japanese version was released on April 15, 2023. The global version, which includes English, Traditional Chinese, and Korean languages, was supposed to release in the same year but due to development changes especially in the JP version, the global version release date was moved to February 1, 2024.

=== Service termination ===
On January 25, 2024, it was announced that the Japanese servers for School Idol Festival 2 would close on March 31 of the same year. An offline local version is provided after service terminated on March 31 16:00 (UTC+9), to let players view the albums (idol cards) and titles got in the game.

Later that same day, the official Twitter account for the global version of the game announced that the game was still slated for release in February, but would end service on May 31. The game finally launched on February 1, and shut down at May 31 06:00 UTC. An offline local version as was in the Japanese version were also provided.

== Love Live! School Idol Festival: After School Activity ==
Love Live! School Idol Festival: After School Activity
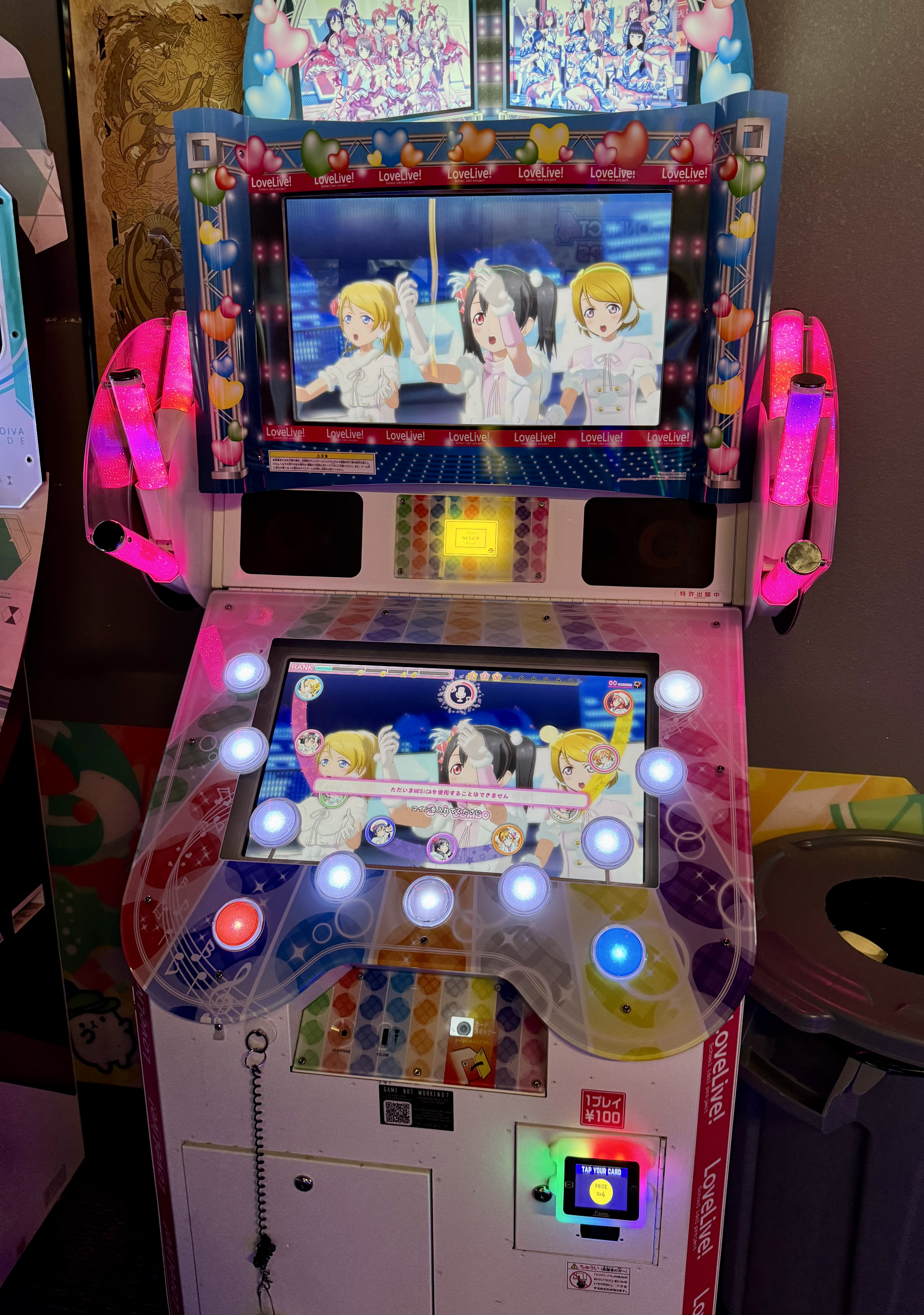
- Arcade cabinet
- Developers: KLabGames; Square Enix
- Publisher: Square Enix
- Platforms: Arcade; PlayStation 4; (PlayStation 5 through backward compatibility)
- Release: Arcade: JP: December 6, 2016 – October 1, 2021; PlayStation 4: NA/JP/SEA: March 24, 2021
- Genre: Rhythm game
- Modes: Single-player; Multiplayer (arcade)

On November 27, 2015, the official website of the game announced the production of the arcade version of Love Live! School Idol Festival. The arcade game titled Love Live! School Idol Festival: After School Activity (Note: ラブライブ! スクールアイドルフェスティバル ～after school ACTIVITY～, Rabu Raibu! Sukūru Aidoru Fesutibaru: After School Activity) (often abbreviated as SIFAC or Sukufesu AC) is a joint development with Square Enix and operates using NESiCA Cards. The name comes from the fact that because the initial release of the game was an arcade game, players will have to go to a game center to play the game, which gives it an "after school" feeling. A beta testing on location were held on May 13–15 and May 27–29, 2016. The game was fully released on December 6 of the same year.

Different from the mobile game, the arcade version featured a cooperative mode; it can be played by up to 3 players in certain modes and has fully 3D CG dances for all songs. It also lets players collect and print Profile Cards and Member Cards—each comes with buff skills—just like the original game. The game had 3 type of in-game events: Birthday Event (バースデーイベント), Skill Card Event (スキルカードイベント), and Score Ranking Event (スコアランキングバトル).

In October 2017, Aqours from Love Live! Sunshine!! were announced to join the arcade game. They first appeared for a limited time from December 6, 2017, until January 8, 2018, as a preliminary trial as part of the game's 1st anniversary campaign.

In April 2018, Square Enix announced the game will receive a major update titled Love Live! School Idol Festival: After School Activity Next Stage as part of Love Live! School Idol Festival's 5th anniversary campaign. Aqours' songs were added as well as a new function named "School Idol Outing" (おでかけ♪スクールアイドル, Odekake Sukūru Aidoru) and a new song difficulty. The group has been officially added to the game along with the major update on December 6, 2018. On September 5, 2019, Saint Snow, the rival duo of Aqours, was added to the game, along with several of their songs.

Square Enix announced in October 2020 that the arcade version will receive a final update on November 10, 2020, essentially ending support for the game's arcade iteration. However, a 4th anniversary "Thank You" promotional campaign was held from December 2020 to March 2021. The game service for the arcade version ended on October 1, 2021.

The arcade version has been ported to PlayStation 4 under the title Love Live! School Idol Festival: After School Activity Wai-Wai! Home Meeting!!, (Note: ラブライブ！スクールアイドルフェスティバル ～after school ACTIVITY～ わいわい！Home Meeting!!, Rabu Raibu! Sukūru Aidoru Fesutibaru: After School Activity Wai Wai! Home Meeting!!; stylised as Love Live! School Idol Festival ～after school ACTIVITY～ Wai-Wai!Home Meeting!!) released digitally in North America, Japan, and Southeast Asia on March 24, 2021.

=== Gameplay ===
The gameplay is similar to its mobile counterpart, but it also features fully 3D animated dance sequences, in which the costume set and the stage can be changed. In the PlayStation 4 version, the amount of buttons played depends on the selected difficulty.

The gameplay is similar to its mobile counterpart, however the arcade version uses nine physical buttons placed around the display panel instead of touchscreen. The main difference from the mobile game is there's no stamina system, so players cannot fail any songs. However, in order to reach higher score and ranking, the player must hit all nine "Finale Rhythm Icons", which is a note with a star, anchor, or snowman (μ's, Aqours, and Saint Snow modes respectively). Each Final Rhythm Icon will add letters to a gauge which would spell out "Love Live!", if all nine are collected. When all nine are collected, the Finale Mode begins, usually at the song's outro, where all notes will yield extra score points. The difficulty levels are different from mobile game to accommodate with physical buttons. The highest difficulty level, "Challenge", requires players to press up to four buttons at once.

The arcade version had a separate card printing machine, where players could collect Member Cards, and create their own Profile Card. The Member Cards were collected through a gacha-style system. A Member Card comes in two varieties, each with different rarities, R and HR. An R card unlocks the costume set, while an HR card also adds additional effects, like "Finale Focus" (introduced in the Next Stage update). Player's Profile Cards are created by taking a screenshot of the desired member in music videos, and adding up to three Skill Cards. These cards could be printed out and shared with other players to assist their gameplay.

=== PlayStation 4 version ===
On October 10, 2020, a console port of the arcade game was announced, titled Love Live! School Idol Festival: After School Activity Wai-Wai! Home Meeting!! (officially abbreviated as SIFAC HM). It was released in North America, Japan, and Southeast Asia on March 24, 2021, for PlayStation 4. The game also features English, simplified and traditional Chinese localisations, similar to other games in the franchise. SIFAC HM received exclusive content not featured in the arcade version. The game is natively backward compatible with PlayStation 5.

SIFAC HM is free-to-start, which the base game includes eight songs. Additional songs are available as paid downloadable content (DLC). At the release, 21 Song Pack DLCs (13 for μ's, and 9 for Aqours / Saint Snow; 117 songs in total) became available.

Unlike the arcade version, SIFAC HM has its own difficulty levels to accommodate for DualShock 4 and DualSense controllers. From easiest to hardest, "Beginner" and "Standard" are played with 4 buttons, while "Hyper" and "Adventure" are played with 6 buttons. Arcade mode with 9 buttons, with all its original difficulty levels, is also available.

Another difference from the arcade version is the player can unlock a costume set by "creating" it, using materials received from playing Live Shows. Alternatively the player can also purchase the costume sets as DLC immediately.

=== Technical issues ===
An infamous bug occurred in the first day after the Next Stage update had been released for the arcades in 2018, wherein sometimes the characters appeared to be naked during the dance sequences. This bug was widely shared on Twitter as screenshots and clips of dancing "Barbie doll-esque" nude characters during gameplay had been spread across it. This bug caused Square Enix to take the game server in "urgent maintenance" for few days in order to fix the bug.

== Love Live! School Idol Festival All Stars ==
Love Live! School Idol Festival All Stars
- Developers: KLabGames (2019-2022); MyNet (2022-2023); Sunrise
- Publisher: Bushiroad
- Composers: Noisycroak; KLab Sound Team
- Engine: Unity
- Platforms: Android; iOS / iPadOS
- Release: JPN: September 26, 2019 – June 30, 2023 (3 years, 9 months and 4 days); WW: February 25, 2020 – June 30, 2023 (3 years, 4 months and 5 days) (Note: Excluding Belgium due to local gambling law banning paid loot boxes (Scouting)); CHN: May 28, 2021 – June 30, 2023 (2 years, 1 month and 2 days)
- Genres: Rhythm game; Role-playing game
- Modes: Single-player; Multiplayer (During events)

A spin-off game of Love Live! School Idol Festival was announced during Tokyo Game Show 2017 as part of the game's 4th anniversary. The new game titled Love Live! School Idol Festival All Stars (Note: ラブライブ！スクールアイドルフェスティバルALL STARS, Rabu Raibu! Sukūru Aidoru Fesutibaru All Stars; stylised as Love Live! School Idol Festival ALL STARS) (officially abbreviated as LLAS (スクスタ, Sukusuta) or SIFAS) for 2019 release. (Note: Originally 2018; pushed back due to technical problems within the in-game CG dance system) The game uses an alternate story that differentiates it from other media where μ's and Aqours are in the same school year and work together as one along with the girls from Nijigasaki High School Idol Club. Owing to this, μ's isn't disbanded, and Chika Takami's original reason for becoming school idol in the anime and earlier sources, which was after seeing μ's on stage, was slightly changed to admiring school idols and then become one herself. The game is described as "the ultimate idol rhythm RPG game" that allows players to 'participate' in the game and customize the school idols. Nijigasaki High School Idol Club performs the opening theme titled "Tokimeki Runners." The game was officially released in Japan on September 26, 2019. A global version which features English, Korean, Traditional Chinese, and Thai languages was released on February 25, 2020. The mainland China server with Simplified Chinese was released on May 28, 2021.

Players assumed the role of the protagonist, a 2nd year student at Nijigasaki High School who becomes interested in school idols after seeing joint live between μ's and Aqours. After looking for a related club in Nijigasaki, the protagonist learns that the existing school idol club is on its last legs of survival and decides to rebuild and reform the school idol club.

New features included: tree-based growth system, new Live system, and "SIF ID" (スクフェスID, Sukufesu ID) system. At launch, players could link both games under the same SIF ID account. Syncing their SIF ID created on Love Live! School Idol Festival with LLAS, players were able to port their rank and their progress made in the game to the new title. Benefits of the new ID offer extended far beyond saving player progress, as player rewards could be obtained until February 2022. As announced through in-game news releases, SIF ID player links ended in April 2022.

In August 2020, a character that appeared within the game's story, Shioriko Mifune, was added to the game as a playable character and Nijigasaki High School Idol Club as an official member. She received a solo song, a 3D model, and cards obtainable within the games scouting boxes. More new members, Lanzhu Zhong and Mia Taylor, were added as playable characters in September 2021.

On December 23, 2021, in a news release in-game, it was announced that the development and operational rights of School Idol Festival All Stars would be moved from KLab Inc. to MyNet Games Inc., while Bushiroad would manage its publishing rights of the game, effective January 6, 2022.

=== Live show system ===
In All Stars, the rhythm portion only consisted of two buttons, but the player could tap anywhere on the screen to register a tap. Also, players were able to have idols of their choice perform in fully 3D animated dance sequences.

Instead of focusing on its "rhythm game" system, the game used an "RPG-like system" where it required the player to carefully build their teams with strategy and train their idols in order to be able to successfully clear a live, as all tapped notes would drain the stamina bar, even when tapped perfectly. The 9 tap note icons that represented the 9 members of an idol group were reduced to two, and the player was able to tap anywhere on the screen to register a tap. During a live show, the participating member(s) were depicted as full-3D models with dance choreography on screen. (Note: Except daily songs and some A-side songs)

In addition to the original members' elements (Smile, Pure, Cool), 3 new elements was added: Active, Natural, and Elegant. Besides elements, the members were also divided by 4 different attributes: Voltage (Vo), Special Skill (Sp), Guard (Gd), and Skill (Sk). During the lives, 9 members were divided into 3 "strategy" units. Strategy units could have different positive and negative effects depending on the members' attributes in the strategy, such as increased tap score, reduced stamina damage, or more frequent skill activation, as well shortened strategy switch time. Only one of the strategies was active at a time, but the player could switch to a different strategy to take advantage of different members' skills and effects and to clear "Appeal Chances" that appeared during a live.

The player could also put the live show in autoplay, where the notes would be tapped automatically, allowed player to focus on controlling the Strategy units completely. (Note: In the previous versions the player needed to play the song once to unlock autoplay.) However, all tapped note timings were "Great", which gained less total voltage compared to manual play. Achieving S rank in a song difficulty allowed player to use Skip Tickets, where player could clear the cleared song without having to actually play the same song's difficulty.

=== Event system ===
Besides the two types of event that also featured in School Idol Festival, there were some type of new event exclusive to All Stars:

- SBL (SIFAS Big Live): A big event where 20 people played at the same time and worked together to reach the goal that the event has set. With the rewards obtained from the event, player was able to acquire the event cards from the previous events, scout tickets, and others.
- Dream Live Parade: Player needed to clear one stage to move onto the next stage with one limitation: they could only use one card for one time (except for featured characters, which was two). Player was able to obtain coins that allows them to exchange the coins with accessories and others.

=== Systems ===
Aside from the new live and event system, the game also had some new systems:

- Practice system: To rise an idol's stats or "Idolizing" them, the player had to acquire needed items through performing live shows, "training", or event rewards. Through practice's skill "bond board," player was also able to unlock the idols' costumes (as well as the re-colored version), side stories, "Inspiration" skills, and navigation voices that was listenable in the front page. The idol's skill tree could also be unlocked further more by acquiring the idol's card's duplicate through "Scouting," event rewards for event-exclusive cards, or using the "School Idol Radiance."
- Training: Player could create a team of 9 cards and send them to a "training camp." The training camp required an Action Point (AP) and giva items for skill tree advancement due completion. The APs replenished up to 3 every 12am and 12pm JST. For certain chances, idols that came to the training camp could get "Inspiration Skills". Depending on the card's rarity, up to 3 Inspiration Skill slot were unlocked by default, and one more slot can be unlocked through practice.
- Bonding system: The player was able to boost the idol's stats through the bonding system. The boosts were applied to all cards of the same idol, not per card. This section is divided in two parts, as the latter was added in later update:
  - Bond Level: As the player cleared (or skipped) live shows with idols in their formation, the idols received certain amount of their "bond points", depending on the difficulty. When reaching certain number of bond points they could reach a new bond level, which gave more stats boost to their cards, and would be able to unlock bond boards as detailed below. It would also unlock their "bond episode", which some was required to unlock certain songs. However, their bond level was initially capped at level 15 at the beginning, but their cap would increase by up to two for each new cards, and "limit increases" (receiving duplicate cards, and using Radiances in practice).
  - Bond board: As the player levelled up the idol's bond level, the player was able to unlock bond boards. Their idol stats could be boosted further through bond board, using their "Memorial Pieces" and "Memento Pieces." A single board consisted of five boost panels, with three of them were always Appeal, Technique, and Stamina each, while the other two varied for each board. Completing the board would proceed to the next unlocked board sequentially, and gave the idol additional bonus. The material cost for each panel became higher in higher level boards. The bond board feature was added since version 1.7.0 in both servers.
- Costume system: Player was able to change a character's 3D model costume, where it would affect them in main menu, bond menu, and live shows. These purely cosmetic costumes were obtainable through UR and SR cards within their bond board or by exchanging the costume tickets.

=== Service termination ===
On April 30, 2023, it was announced that the game would end service on June 30, 2023.

== Nijigasaki High School Idol Club ==
The members of Nijigasaki High School Idol Club as of September 2021. From left to right: Mia, Rina, Setsuna, Ai, Shizuku, Ayumu, Kasumi, Karin, Kanata, Emma, Shioriko, and Lanzhu.

In March 2017, the official website of Love Live School Idol Festival launched a new project called "Perfect Dream Project", which features 9 new girls. Emma, Kanata Konoe, and Shizuku Osaka were three members who were already featured as N-rarity girls and topped the 3rd popularity poll. The remaining 6 girls were later introduced: Ayumu Uehara, Kasumi Nakasu, Karin Asaka, Ai Miyashita, Setsuna Yuki, and Rina Tennoji. In August 2020, a new member, Shioriko Mifune was added. In September 2021, Lanzhu Zhong and Mia Taylor were also added.

The members are part of the school idol club at Nijigasaki High School that is located in Odaiba, Tokyo. The school is popular due to its free school style and diverse majors. Unlike μ's and Aqours, they are not a group, but rather individual school idols who compete with each other; Until 2019, a popularity poll was held every month to determine their rank. (Note: Until 2019; It was changed to a monthly questionnaire in 2020 onward.) Together, they are referred as "Nijigasaki High School Idol Club" (Note: 虹ヶ咲学園スクールアイドル同好会, Nijigasaki Gakuen Sukūru Aidoru Dōkō-kai)—shortened as Nijigaku or simply Nijigasaki in the official sources. The girls were split up into groups of three to begin activities in three different apps before their addition to the game: Dengeki Online website (Kasumi, Karin, Setsuna), Famitsu App website (Ayumu, Ai, Rina), and the game's official website (Emma, Shizuku, Kanata). Each place is working as a separate room or branch office for the Nijigasaki High School.

They are featured in the spin-off game Love Live! School Idol Festival All Stars along with μ's and Aqours. They also appear as SR rarity cards in Love Live! School Idol Festival. Each member also got a solo song that was released along with the group's theme song for the new game on November 21, 2018. Their second album, containing more solo songs, was released on October 2, 2019. The third album that also includes Shioriko's first solo single was released on September 2, 2020. The fourth album includes solo songs for the original 9 members, as well as solo songs for the three newly added members. It was released on October 13, 2021.

The names of the girls' sub-units were decided by community polls. Rather than three sub-units of three members like μ's and Aqours, the Nijigasaki girls were divided into a duo, trio, and a quartet. The sub-unit formations and naming were announced on June 10, 2019. The formations are: Karin-Ai (DiverDiva), Ayumu-Shizuku-Setsuna (A・Zu・Na), and Kasumi-Kanata-Emma-Rina (Qu4rtz, pronounced "Quartz"). The sub-unit's first singles were released February 12, 2020. A new sub-unit was later announced in July 2021. It consists of Shioriko Mifune, Lanzhu Zhong, and Mia Taylor. The sub-unit's name was later announced as R3birth. Their first single was released on October 6, 2021.

An anime adaptation titled Love Live! Nijigasaki High School Idol Club (Note: Japanese: ラブライブ！虹ヶ咲学園スクールアイドル同好会, Hepburn: Rabu Raibu! Nijigasaki Gakuen Sukūru Aidoru Dōkō-kai) started broadcast in October 2020. The anime features a slightly different storyline from the game, original protagonist character Yu Takasaki, as well as cameos from School Idol Festival N-rarity girls who did not make it into the "Perfect Dream Project." A second season premiered in April 2022, with the three new members that were added to the game—Shioriko Mifune, Mia Taylor, and Lanzhu Zhong— making their appearance.

== Other media ==
=== Discography ===
CDs and albums released as part of campaign from the game franchise. Note that since Nijigasaki High School Idol Club were created for School Idol Festival All Stars, any music releases not tied to the game are not included.

Type	Title	Artist(s)	Release date	Notes
2014
Single	"Takaramonos / Paradise Live" (タカラモノズ / Paradise Live)	μ's	January 29	Collaboration single with School Idol Festival to celebrate 1 million downloads in Japan
Single	"Eien Friends" (永遠フレンズ)	Printemps	November 12	Collaboration singles with School Idol Festival to celebrate 3 million downloads in Japan
Single	"Aki no Anata no Sora Tōku" (秋のあなたの空遠く)	Lily White	November 26	Collaboration singles with School Idol Festival to celebrate 3 million downloads in Japan
Single	"Fuyu ga Kureta Yokan" (冬がくれた予感)	BiBi	December 24	Collaboration singles with School Idol Festival to celebrate 3 million downloads in Japan
2015
Single	"Heart to Heart!"	μ's	October 28	Collaboration singles with School Idol Festival
Single	"Wao-Wao Powerful Day!"	Printemps	November 25	Collaboration singles with School Idol Festival
Single	"Omoide Ijō ni Naritakute" (思い出以上になりたくて)	Lily White	December 23	Collaboration singles with School Idol Festival
2016
Single	"Sakkaku Crossroads" (錯覚CROSSROADS)	BiBi	January 20	Collaboration singles with School Idol Festival
Single	"Jingle Bell ga Tomaranai" (ジングルベルがとまらない)	Aqours	November 23	Collaboration singles with School Idol Festival
2018
Album	Tokimeki Runners	Nijigasaki High School Idol Club	November 21	Opening theme for All Stars and the group's 1st album
2019
Album	Love U My Friends	Nijigasaki High School Idol Club	October 2	Nijigasaki High School Idol Club 2nd album
Single	"Kokoro Magic "A to Z""	Aqours	October 30	Collaboration single with All Stars
Single	"New Romantic Sailors"	Guilty Kiss	November 27	Collaboration singles with School Idol Festival
Single	"Braveheart Coaster"	CYaRon!	December 4	Collaboration singles with School Idol Festival
Single	"Amazing Travel DNA"	Azalea	December 11	Collaboration singles with School Idol Festival
2020
Single	"Super Nova"	DiverDiva	February 12	1st single
Single	"Dream Land! Dream World!"	A・Zu・Na	February 12	1st single
Single	"Sing & Smile!!"	Qu4rtz	February 12	1st single
Album	Just Believe!!!	Nijigasaki High School Idol Club	September 2	Nijigasaki High School Idol Club 3rd album, which also features first single for newly added member, Shioriko Mifune
2021
Single	"The Secret Night"	DiverDiva	May 26	2nd single
Single	"Maze Town"	A・Zu・Na	June 16	2nd single
Single	"Swinging!"	Qu4rtz	July 14	2nd single
Single	"Monster Girls"	R3birth	October 6	R3birth's first single. Includes one sub-unit track and 3 solos for each members.
Album	L! L! L! (Love the Life We Live)	Nijigasaki High School Idol Club	October 13	Nijigasaki High School Idol Club 4th album, which also features solo songs from Mia Taylor and Lanzhu Zhong
2022
Single	"Vroom Vroom"	R3birth	September 28	2nd single
Single	"Shadow Effect"	DiverDiva	October 5	3rd single
Single	"Eien no Isshun" (永遠の一瞬)	Nijigasaki High School Idol Club	October 12	Artist name also listed as "Nijigaku with You" as the song were made with cooperation from fans.
Single	"Blue!"	A・Zu・Na	November 2	3rd single
Single	"Pastel"	Qu4rtz	November 23	3rd single
2023
Single	"Miracle New Story"	Liella!	May 17	Theme song for Miracle Live!
Single	Kagayaki Don't forget!	Nijigasaki High School Idol Club	June 7	Insert song in Chapter 53 of All Stars
Album	Fly with You!!	Nijigasaki High School Idol Club	October 4	Nijigasaki High School Idol Club 5th album
2024
Single	"New Year's March!/Radio Taisou Dai Ichi (Nijigasaki High School Idol Club Ver.)" (New Year's March!/ラジオ体操第一(虹ヶ咲学園スクールアイドル同好会 Ver.))	Nijigasaki High School Idol Club	January 24	Double A-side single containing a theme song for Miracle Live!

=== Print ===
Several books featuring the games' illustration cards and original story collection have been released since 2013.

Release date	Title	Publisher	ISBN
July 30, 2013	Love Live! School Idol Festival Official Guide Book (ラブライブ! スクールアイドルフェスティバル 公式ガイドブック)	ASCII Media Works	ISBN 978-4-04-891903-6
July 19, 2014	Love Live! School Idol Festival Official Illustration Book (ラブライブ! スクールアイドルフェスティバル official illustration book)	ASCII Media Works	ISBN 978-4-04-866727-2
July 19, 2014	Love Live! School Idol Festival Official Fan Book (ラブライブ! スクールアイドルフェスティバル official fan book)	Enterbrain	ISBN 978-4-04-729823-1
June 27, 2015	Love Live! School Idol Festival Official Illustration Book 2 (ラブライブ! スクールアイドルフェスティバル official illustration book 2)	ASCII Media Works	ISBN 978-4-04-893207-3
April 12, 2016	Love Live! School Idol Festival Official Illustration Book 3 (ラブライブ! スクールアイドルフェスティバル official illustration book 3)	ASCII Media Works	ISBN 978-4-04-865865-2
January 30, 2017	Love Live! School Idol Festival Official Illustration Book 4 (ラブライブ! スクールアイドルフェスティバル official illustration book 4)	ASCII Media Works	ISBN 978-4-04-892654-6
October 30, 2017	Love Live! School Idol Festival Aqours Official Illustration Book (ラブライブ!スクールアイドルフェスティバル Aqours official illustration book)	ASCII Media Works	ISBN 978-4-04-893376-6
December 20, 2017	Love Live! School Idol Festival Aqours Official Story Book (ラブライブ！スクールアイドルフェスティバル Aqours official story book)	ASCII Media Works	ISBN 978-4-04-893508-1
June 30, 2018	Love Live! School Idol Festival Aqours Official Illustration Book 2 (ラブライブ!スクールアイドルフェスティバル Aqours official illustration book 2)	Kadokawa	ISBN 978-4-04-893814-3
March 30, 2019	Love Live! School Idol Festival Aqours Official Illustration Book 3 (ラブライブ!スクールアイドルフェスティバル Aqours official illustration book 3)	Kadokawa	ISBN 978-4-04-912435-4
March 30, 2020	Love Live! School Idol Festival Aqours Official Illustration Book 4 (ラブライブ!スクールアイドルフェスティバル Aqours official illustration book 4)	Kadokawa	ISBN 978-4-04-913125-3
March 24, 2021	Love Live! School Idol Festival: After School Activity Wai-Wai! Home Meeting!! – μʼs Memorial Special Book (ラブライブ！スクールアイドルフェスティバル ～after school ACTIVITY～ わいわい！Home Meeting!! μ's メモリアルスペシャルパック)	Square Enix	
March 24, 2021	Love Live! School Idol Festival: After School Activity Wai-Wai! Home Meeting!! – Aqours Memorial Special Book (ラブライブ！スクールアイドルフェスティバル ～after school ACTIVITY～ わいわい！Home Meeting!! Aqoursメモリアルスペシャルパック)	Square Enix	
March 31, 2023	Love Live! School Idol Festival Official Illustration Book 5 (ラブライブ! スクールアイドルフェスティバル official illustration book 5)	Kadokawa	ISBN 978-4-04-914982-1
October 30, 2023	Love Live! School Idol Festival Aqours Official Illustration Book 5 (ラブライブ!スクールアイドルフェスティバル Aqours official illustration book 5)	Kadokawa	ISBN 978-4-04-915184-8
December 15, 2023	Love Live! School Idol Festival All Stars Complete Book (ラブライブ!スクールアイドルフェスティバル ALL STARS Complete Book)	Kadokawa	ISBN 978-4-04-915307-1

=== Manga ===
A 4-koma manga titled Ten Fes: Transfer Student Festival (てん☆ふぇす ~転入生フェスティバル~) was published on the School Idol Festival application. The 4-koma featured stories centered around the N-rarity girls. It was published every Friday starting from September 30, 2016, and ended on its 54th episode.

After the announcement of the "Perfect Dream Project", three 4-koma manga were published via the Love Live! School Idol Festival All Stars, Dengeki Online, and Famitsu App official websites respectively as a part of Nijigasaki High School Idol Club's activities. The first manga, titled Sugoi Ten Fes (すごい てん☆ふぇす), was focused on the N-rarity members who topped the popularity poll: Shizuku Ōsaka, Kanata Konoe, and Emma Verde. The second 4-koma manga focused on Kasumi Nakasu, Karin Asaka, and Setsuna Yūki, and began on July 4, 2017. It was illustrated by Miyakohito. The third 4-koma manga focused on Ayumu Uehara, Ai Miyashita, and Rina Tennōji, and began on October 3, 2017. It was illustrated by Choboraunyopomi.

== Reception ==
As of September 12, 2017, the game has reached over 40 million users worldwide (Japanese and Global server combined). This exclude multiple accounts on same devices. In Japan, the game grossed more than ¥16.4 billion ($149.43 million) between 2017 and 2018, including more than ¥8.8 billion in 2017, and ¥7.6 billion in 2018.

As of May 1, 2020, the global server of Love Live! School Idol Festival All Stars has reached over 1 million players.

=== In popular culture ===
The voice clips "I'm so happy!" and "I'm so sad" by Mari Ohara from Love Live! School Idol Festival All Stars became trending on the video sharing platform TikTok in October 2021.

=== Censorship of same-sex relationships ===
Fans of the English version of the Love Live! School Idol Festival game discovered that most of the homosexual subtext between the various girls depicted in the game was removed. In some instances, overt references to relationships between girls were changed to imply a relationship between a girl and a boy. KLab has since issued a statement on the controversy and later released an update on June 30, 2015, to make adjustments to the translated text to retain their original meanings.
