= List of Love Live! School Idol Project episodes =

Love Live! School Idol Project
- Key visual for the second season
- No. of episodes: 26

Release
- Original network: Tokyo MX
- Original release: January 6, 2013 – June 29, 2014

Season chronology
- Next → Love Live! Sunshine!!

Love Live! School Idol Project is an anime television series produced by Sunrise in collaboration with ASCII Media Works and Lantis as part of the Love Live! franchise. The series follows a group of school girls who form an idol group in order to save their school from being shut down. The first season aired 13 episodes on Tokyo MX from January 6 to March 31, 2013.

The opening theme is "Bokura wa Ima no Naka de" (僕らは今のなかで; lit. 'We're Living in the Moment'), while the ending theme is "Kitto Seishun ga Kikoeru" (きっと青春が聞こえる; lit. 'Surely Our Youth Will Hear Us'); both are performed by μ's (Emi Nitta, Aya Uchida, Suzuko Mimori, Yoshino Nanjō, Pile, Riho Iida, Aina Kusuda, Yurika Kubo and Sora Tokui). A second season aired from April 6 to June 29, 2014. The opening theme is "It's Our Miraculous Time" (Note: Official English title from Love Live! School Idol Festival video game series) (それは僕たちの奇跡, Sore wa Bokutachi no Kiseki; lit. 'That's Our Miracle'), while the ending theme is "Donna Toki mo Zutto" (どんなときもずっと, Always No Matter What); both are performed by μ's. Both seasons are licensed in North America by NIS America and are simulcast by Crunchyroll. An animated film, Love Live! The School Idol Movie, was released on June 13, 2015.

== Episode list ==
=== Season 1 ===
Overall	Episode	Title	Insert song(s)	Ending theme singer(s)	Original release date
1	1	"Come True! Our Dreams"; Transliteration: "Kanae! Watashitachi no Yume" (Japanese: 叶え!私たちの夢――)	"Susume→Tomorrow" (ススメ→トゥモロウ, Susume→Tumorō; lit. 'March Forward to Tomorrow') by Honoka Kōsaka (Emi Nitta), Kotori Minami (Aya Uchida) and Umi Sonoda (Suzuko Mimori) "Private Wars" by A-Rise (Tsubasa Kira (Megu Sakuragawa), Erina Tōdō (Maho Matsunaga) and Anju Yūki (Ayuru Ōhashi))	—	January 6, 2013
2	2	"Let's be Idols!"; Transliteration: "Aidoru o Hajimeyō!" (Japanese: アイドルを始めよう!)	"Start:Dash!!" by Maki Nishikino (Pile) "Private Wars" by A-Rise	Honoka Kōsaka (Emi Nitta), Kotori Minami (Aya Uchida) and Umi Sonoda (Suzuko Mimori)	January 13, 2013
3	3	"First Live"; Transliteration: "Fāsuto Raibu" (Japanese: ファーストライブ)	"Start:Dash!!" by Honoka Kōsaka (Emi Nitta), Kotori Minami (Aya Uchida) and Umi Sonoda (Suzuko Mimori) "Private Wars" by A-Rise	μ's	January 20, 2013
4	4	"MakiRinPana" (Japanese: まきりんぱな)	"Start:Dash!!" by Honoka Kōsaka (Emi Nitta), Kotori Minami (Aya Uchida) and Umi Sonoda (Suzuko Mimori)	Rin Hoshizora (Riho Iida), Maki Nishikino (Pile) and Hanayo Koizumi (Yurika Kubo)	January 27, 2013
5	5	"Nico Attacks"; Transliteration: "Niko Shūrai" (Japanese: にこ襲来)	—	Nico Yazawa (Sora Tokui)	February 3, 2013
6	6	"Who is the Center?"; Transliteration: "Sentā wa Dare da?" (Japanese: センターは誰だ?)	"Korekara no Someday" (これからのSomeday; lit. 'Someday in the Future') by Honoka Kōsaka (Emi Nitta), Kotori Minami (Aya Uchida), Umi Sonoda (Suzuko Mimori), Rin Hoshizora (Riho Iida), Maki Nishikino (Pile), Hanayo Koizumi (Yurika Kubo) and Nico Yazawa (Sora Tokui)	Honoka Kōsaka (Emi Nitta), Kotori Minami (Aya Uchida), Umi Sonoda (Suzuko Mimori), Rin Hoshizora (Riho Iida), Maki Nishikino (Pile), Hanayo Koizumi (Yurika Kubo) and Nico Yazawa (Sora Tokui)	February 10, 2013
7	7	"Elichika"; Transliteration: "Erīchika" (Japanese: エリーチカ)	"Start:Dash!!" by Honoka Kōsaka (Emi Nitta), Kotori Minami (Aya Uchida) and Umi Sonoda (Suzuko Mimori)	Eli Ayase (Yoshino Nanjō) and Nozomi Tojo (Aina Kusuda)	February 17, 2013
8	8	"What I Want to Do"; Transliteration: "Yaritai koto wa" (Japanese: やりたいことは)	"Korekara no Someday" (これからのSomeday; lit. 'Someday in the Future') by Honoka Kōsaka (Emi Nitta), Kotori Minami (Aya Uchida), Umi Sonoda (Suzuko Mimori), Rin Hoshizora (Riho Iida), Maki Nishikino (Pile), Hanayo Koizumi (Yurika Kubo) and Nico Yazawa (Sora Tokui) "Bokura no Live, Kimi to no Life" (僕らのLIVE 君とのLIFE, Our Live, Your Life) by μ's	μ's	February 24, 2013
9	9	"Wonder Zone"; Transliteration: "Wandā Zōn" (Japanese: ワンダーゾーン)	"Wonder Zone" by μ's	Kotori Minami (Aya Uchida)	March 3, 2013
10	10	"No Senpai Allowed!"; Transliteration: "Senpai Kinshi!" (Japanese: 先輩禁止)	—	μ's	March 10, 2013
11	11	"The Greatest Live"; Transliteration: "Saikō no Raibu" (Japanese: 最高のライブ)	"No Brand Girls" by μ's	μ's	March 17, 2013
12	12	"Friends"; Transliteration: "Tomodachi" (Japanese: ともだち)	—	Honoka Kōsaka (Emi Nitta)	March 24, 2013
13	13	"μ's Music Start!"; Transliteration: "Myūzu Myūjikku Sutāto!" (Japanese: μ'sミュージックスタート!)	"Susume→Tomorrow" (ススメ→トゥモロウ, Susume→Tumorō; lit. 'March Forward to Tomorrow') by Honoka Kōsaka (Emi Nitta), Kotori Minami (Aya Uchida) and Umi Sonoda (Suzuko Mimori) "Start:Dash!!" by μ's	μ's	March 31, 2013
OVA	OVA	"—"	"Music S.T.A.R.T!!" by μ's	—	November 27, 2013

=== Season 2 ===
Overall	Episode	Title	Insert song(s)	Ending theme singer(s)	Original release date
14	1	"Another Love Live!"; Transliteration: "Mō Ichido Rabu Raibu!" (Japanese: もう一度ラブライブ!)	"Koremade no Love Live! (Musical ver.)" (これまでのラブライブ! 〜ミュージカルver.〜, Koremade no Raburaibu! Myujikaru ver.; Previously on Love Live! (Musical ver.)) by μ's, Hideko (Marie Miyake), Fumiko (Nozomi Yamamoto) and Mika (Sayuri Hara)	—	April 6, 2014
15	2	"Aiming for Victory"; Transliteration: "Yūshō o Mezashite" (Japanese: 優勝をめざして)	—	Eli Ayase (Yoshino Nanjō), Nozomi Tojo (Aina Kusuda) and Nico Yazawa (Sora Tokui)	April 13, 2014
16	3	"Door of Dreams"; Transliteration: "Yume no Tobira" (Japanese: ユメノトビラ)	"Shocking Party" by A-Rise "Yume no Tobira" (ユメノトビラ, Door of Dreams) by μ's	μ's	April 20, 2014
17	4	"No. 1 Idol in the Universe"; Transliteration: "Uchū No. 1 Aidoru" (Japanese: 宇宙No.1アイドル)	—	Nico Yazawa (Sora Tokui)	April 27, 2014
18	5	"A New Me"; Transliteration: "Atarashī Watashi" (Japanese: 新しいわたし)	"Love Wing Bell" by Rin Hoshizora (Riho Iida), Maki Nishikino (Pile), Hanayo Koizumi (Yurika Kubo), Eli Ayase (Yoshino Nanjō), Nozomi Tojo (Aina Kusuda) and Nico Yazawa (Sora Tokui)	Rin Hoshizora (Riho Iida)	May 4, 2014
19	6	"Happy Halloween"; Transliteration: "Happī Harowīn" (Japanese: ハッピーハロウィーン)	"Dancing Stars on Me!" by μ's	Rin Hoshizora (Riho Iida), Maki Nishikino (Pile) and Hanayo Koizumi (Yurika Kubo)	May 11, 2014
20	7	"We Have to do Something!"; Transliteration: "Nantoka Shinakya!" (Japanese: なんとかしなきゃ!)	—	Honoka Kōsaka (Emi Nitta), Kotori Minami (Aya Uchida) and Umi Sonoda (Suzuko Mimori)	May 18, 2014
21	8	"My Wish"; Transliteration: "Watashi no Nozomi" (Japanese: 私の望み)	—	Eli Ayase (Yoshino Nanjō), Maki Nishikino (Pile) and Nozomi Tojo (Aina Kusuda)	May 25, 2014
22	9	"Melody of the Heart"; Transliteration: "Kokoro no Merodi" (Japanese: 心のメロディ)	"Snow Halation" by μ's	—	June 1, 2014
23	10	"μ's"	—	Honoka Kōsaka (Emi Nitta)	June 8, 2014
24	11	"Our Decision"; Transliteration: "Watashi-tachi ga Kimeta Koto" (Japanese: 私たちが決めたこと)	—	μ's	June 15, 2014
25	12	"Last Live"; Transliteration: "Rasuto Raibu" (Japanese: ラストライブ)	"KiRa-KiRa Sensation" by μ's "Bokura wa Ima no Naka de" (僕らは今のなかで, We're Living in the Moment) by μ's	—	June 22, 2014
26	13	"Come True! Everyone's Dreams"; Transliteration: "Kanae! Minna no Yume" (Japanese: 叶え!みんなの夢---)	"Happy Maker" by μ's "Aishiteru Banzai! (Piano Mix)" (愛してるばんざーい!（Piano Mix）, Hooray for I Love You (Piano Mix)) by μ's "Oh, Love & Peace!" by μ's	—	June 29, 2014
