= Snow Halation =

Single by μ's

from the album μ's Best Album Best Live! Collection
- B-side: "Baby Maybe Koi no Button"
- Released: December 22, 2010
- Genre: J-pop; anime song
- Length: 4:19
- Label: Lantis
- Composer: Takahiro Yamada
- Lyricist: Aki Hata
- Producer: Shigeru Saitō

μ's singles chronology
"Bokura no Live Kimi to no Life" (2010)	"Snow Halation" (2010)	"Natsuiro Egao de 1, 2, Jump!" (2011)

Audio sample
- A 24-second sample featuring the chorus after the second verse.: file; help

Music video
- Original music video, as released in 2010. (6:02) on YouTube

"Snow Halation" (Note: Stylized as "Snow halation") is a song by the Japanese idol group μ's as part of the Love Live! multimedia franchise. Composed by Takahiro Yamada with lyrics by Aki Hata, it was released by Lantis as the group's second single on December 22, 2010. The release was accompanied by a six-minute anime music video produced by studio Sunrise. A re-animated sequence was broadcast in June 2014 as an insert song in the ninth episode of the second season of the Love Live! School Idol Project anime television series.

"Snow Halation" became a well-known anime song in the 2010s, and it has been cited as representative of the Love Live! franchise. It was performed as one of the final songs at all six of μ's' concerts from 2012 to 2016, and it was the last song they performed at the franchise-wide concert in 2020. In 2019, "Snow Halation" was awarded the Special Prize in the Heisei Anisong Grand Prix for songs of the 2010s. Despite its later popularity, "Snow Halation" only sold enough copies in its initial release to peak at No. 74 on Japan's weekly Oricon singles chart.

Yamada has attributed the popularity of the song to the lyrics and the arrangement by Ryosuke Nakanishi. Lyrically, the song describes the narrator's feelings of love and being unable to hold back from expressing them, an emotion they dub a "snow halation". The single has been praised for creating a perfect harmony between the vocals and music, and the choice of words for the lyrics has been called masterful.

== Background ==
Love Live! School Idol Project was first announced in the July 2010 issue of ASCII Media Works' Dengeki G's Magazine, which revealed that the magazine would be collaborating with the anime studio Sunrise and the music label Lantis to co-produce it. Love Live! officially began with the August 2010 issue of Dengeki G's Magazine, which introduced the story, characters, and a more detailed explanation of the project. Takahiro Yamada made his professional debut as a composer in 2009, with "Good Smile Season" by Natsuko Aso, and one of the songs he composed for Lantis was later chosen to be the debut single "Bokura no Live Kimi to no Life" (僕らのLIVE 君とのLIFE, Our Live, Life with You) for the then-unnamed idol group at the center of Love Live!.

Shortly before the release of "Bokura no Live Kimi to no Life" in August 2010, the September 2010 issue of Dengeki G's Magazine sold on July 30 announced that the second single for the idol group was planned for release in December 2010, and Yamada was again chosen to compose it. Additionally, the same issue gave readers the chance to participate in an online mobile phone popularity contest to rank the idol group members, which influenced the positions of the idols in the anime music video produced by Sunrise. For example, the idol who ranked first would be in the center position in the front row in the music video that followed. It was announced on September 10 that the center position had been awarded to Honoka Kōsaka (Emi Nitta). Also, the rest of the cast members who had previously been kept secret were unveiled in the November 2010 issue of Dengeki G's Magazine sold on September 30. Fans also determined the name of the idol group, ultimately choosing the name μ's (/mjuz/, muse) revealed in the January 2011 issue of Dengeki G's Magazine sold on November 30.

== Composition ==
"Snow Halation" is a pop song with instrumentation from piano, violin, acoustic guitar, electric guitar, bass guitar, drums, and jingle bells. It is set in common time and moves at a tempo of 173 beats per minute in the A major key throughout the song (aside from the break, in which the mode temporarily changes to minor). The introduction features piano and jingle bells, and quickly transitions into the first verse, immediately followed by the second verse and chorus. After a bridge is used, this pattern is repeated for the next two verses and chorus featuring the same music with different lyrics. A break is used to transition into the original chorus, which includes a short solo by Honoka Kōsaka (Emi Nitta), as the outro. An instrumental coda is used to close the song.

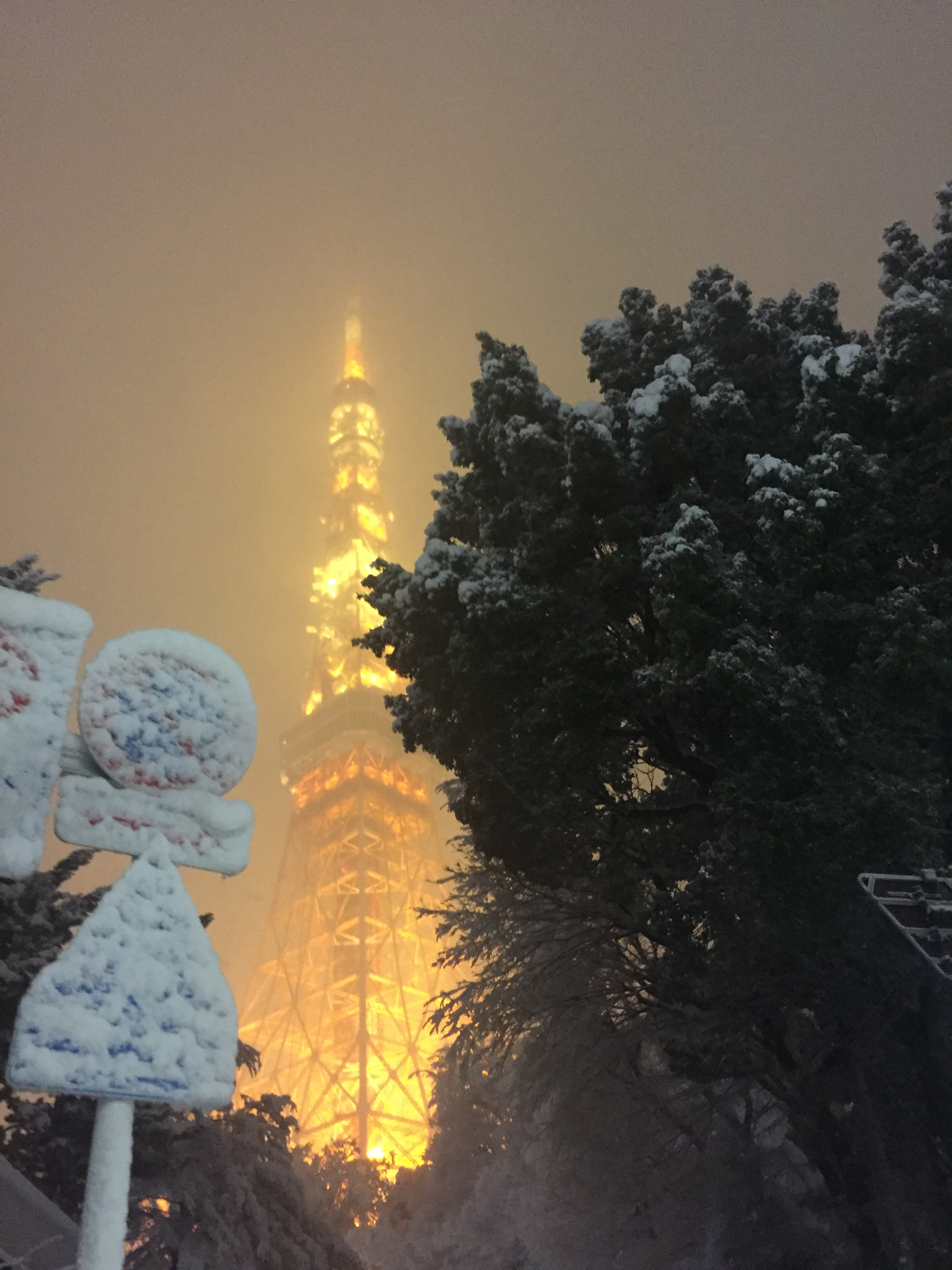
A halation effect blurring the light from Tokyo Tower during a 2018 blizzard

Composer Takahiro Yamada attributed the popularity of the song to the lyrics written by Aki Hata, and the arrangement by Ryosuke Nakanishi. Yamada loved the lyrics Hata wrote to the music, and he lauded Hata's choice of words as very fitting for the melody. Yamada had previously worked as Nakanishi's assistant for a year, and he was amazed when Nakanishi later told him that he had been chosen to arrange "Snow Halation". The lyrics tell the story of a girl describing her love for someone and not being able to hold back from expressing it, earnestly asking the listener to "please accept all of my love for you." (Note: Kono mama ikki ni aijō azukete Please!! (Japanese: このまま一気に愛情 あずけて Please!!)) The cover artwork features the nine members of μ's in their costumes featured in the music video; the design was handled by Yumi Gyotoku.

== Release and reception ==
"Snow Halation" was released on December 22, 2010, as a CD by Lantis in Japan. It came bundled with a DVD containing the music video for "Snow Halation". The song peaked at No. 74 on Japan's weekly Oricon singles chart and charted for 3 weeks. "Snow Halation" peaked on the Billboard Japan Top Singles chart at No. 70. "Snow Halation" was awarded the Special Prize in the Heisei Anisong Grand Prix for songs produced in the 2010s. On the karaoke-based social media website Utasuki operated by the karaoke brand Joysound, "Snow Halation" ranked at No. 11 among people in their 20s in 2015, and in August of that year, the song ranked at No. 1 on Joysound among songs from the Love Live! franchise. "Snow Halation" was ranked the No. 1 anime song on the show Countdown Live: Anison Best 100! aired on NHK BS Premium in February 2017.

In a review by LisAni!, an anime music magazine published by Sony Magazines under Sony Music Entertainment Japan, "Snow Halation" is described as producing a perfect harmony between the vocals that "convey fleeting feelings piled up like snow in one's heart, a gentle radiance that emanates from it, and a lively sound that enters into a brilliant climax." The use of piano and string instruments that is said to give the song a mellow aspect are described as gently enlivening the song at higher tempos. In contrast, the drums and bass guitar are said to give an aggressive and brisk aspect that convey the high tempo of the song.

In a review for Animate Times, Junichi Tsukakoshi praises the melody, lyrics and arrangement. He notes the song's classic approach to its composition, starting out graceful and calm before gradually building to a high note that climaxes during the high point of the song with the use of string instruments. One of the song's charms is also noted in the gap produced between the heartrending portions and the uplifting climax. The choice of words for the lyrics is described as masterful, making the meaning easy to understand while trying to express the exhilarating feeling of the melody.

== Music video ==
μ's performing "Snow Halation" at the city square in Tokyo. The colors of the Christmas lights change from white to orange at the start of the final chorus.

The music video is animated by Sunrise and directed by Takahiko Kyōgoku. The video begins with Honoka Kōsaka running through the city streets interposed with shots of the other eight members of μ's alluding to feelings of love they want to express, with lastly Honoka buying a Christmas present. The video then shifts to μ's in a tree-lined courtyard lit with Christmas lights as they perform "Snow Halation" to choreographed dancing, again interposed with shots of the girls making preparations for the upcoming Christmas holiday. As the song enters into Honoka's mini solo, the white lights that had decorated the trees turn orange, which is Honoka's image color, and remain orange for the rest of the video. The video ends with Honoka meeting someone in town whom she wanted to give the present.

A re-animated sequence for "Snow Halation" was featured in the ninth episode of Love Live! School Idol Project's second season, "Melody of the Heart", which aired in June 2014. The relative positions of each girl on the stage is retained from the original, but the re-animated version does not break away from the performance, and displays overall better animation and art quality. In a review by Anime News Network, Nick Creamer described this as "the show's best idol song, [with the] best choreography, and best direction." Freelance writer Yūko Shōji echoed this sentiment in Ohta Publishing's anime and video game magazine Continue, stating that it was "worth watching even just the performance," and that it was "clear from their mesmerizing expressions just how much work the production team put into it." A short version of the song was again re-animated in 3D computer graphics in 2018 to promote the video game Love Live! School Idol Festival All Stars.

== Live performances ==
External videos
- Live performance of "Snow Halation" during the second day of μ's→Next LoveLive! 2014: Endless Parade concert on YouTube

"Snow Halation" was performed as one of the final songs at all six of μ's' concerts: μ's First Love Live! in February 2012, μ's New Year LoveLive! 2013 in January 2013, μ's 3rd Anniversary LoveLive! in June 2013, μ's→Next LoveLive! 2014: Endless Parade in February 2014, μ's Go→Go! LoveLive! 2015: Dream Sensation! in January and February 2015, and μ's Final LoveLive! μ'sic Forever in March and April 2016. When μ's reunited after four years to perform at the franchise-wide concert Love Live! Series 9th Anniversary: Love Live! Fest in January 2020, "Snow Halation" was the last song they performed.

"Snow Halation" was performed by Tokyo Philharmonic Orchestra with six of μ's members as guest singers in Love Live! Anime 10th Anniversary Orchestra Concert in March 2024, as well as its rerun in January 2025 with five of μ's members.

On December 10, 2023, during the second day of a collaboration concert with The Idolmaster franchise, titled Ijigen Fes Idolmaster Love Live! Uta Gassen, (Note: 異次元フェス アイドルマスター★♥ラブライブ！歌合戦, Ijigen Fesu Aidorumasutā Rabu Raibu! Uta Gassen) the idol groups from The Idolmaster performed "Snow Halation".

During live performances, it had become common practice for the audience to use white glow sticks throughout most of the song, and then to switch to orange glow sticks at the start of the final chorus to imitate what happens with the lights in the music video. According to Yōhei Kisara who has worked as a music producer for the Love Live! franchise, this practice began during μ's' first concert, and it was spontaneously started by fans.

== Track listing ==
All lyrics are written by Aki Hata.

No.	Title	Music	Arrangement	Length
1.	"Snow Halation"	Takahiro Yamada	Ryosuke Nakanishi	4:19
2.	"Baby Maybe Koi no Button" (baby maybe 恋のボタン Baby Maybe Love Button)	Akihiko Yamaguchi	Akihiko Yamaguchi	4:31
3.	"Snow Halation (Off Vocal)"	Takahiro Yamada	Ryosuke Nakanishi	4:19
4.	"Baby Maybe Koi no Button (Off Vocal)" (baby maybe 恋のボタン Baby Maybe Love Button)	Akihiko Yamaguchi	Akihiko Yamaguchi	4:31
Total length:				17:40

Drama tracks
No.	Title	Performance	Length
5.	"Seiya no Onnanokotachi. ...Mada Akarui kedo" (聖夜の女の子たち。…まだ明るいけど The Girls On Christmas Eve... Though It's Still Daytime)	μ's	8:17
6.	"Anata to Christmas -Kōsaka Honoka-" (あなたとクリスマス-高坂穂乃果- Christmas With You -Honoka Kōsaka-)	Emi Nitta	1:04
7.	"Anata to Christmas -Ayase Eri-" (あなたとクリスマス-絢瀬絵里- Christmas With You -Eli Ayase)	Yoshino Nanjō	1:03
8.	"Anata to Christmas -Minami Kotori-" (あなたとクリスマス-南ことり- Christmas With You -Kotori Minami-)	Aya Uchida	1:18
9.	"Anata to Christmas -Sonoda Umi-" (あなたとクリスマス-園田海未- Christmas With You -Umi Sonoda-)	Suzuko Mimori	0:59
10.	"Anata to Christmas -Hoshizora Rin-" (あなたとクリスマス-星空凛- Christmas With You -Rin Hoshizora-)	Riho Iida	0:51
11.	"Anata to Christmas -Nishikino Maki-" (あなたとクリスマス-西木野真姫- Christmas With You -Maki Nishikino-)	Pile	1:02
12.	"Anata to Christmas -Tōjō Nozomi-" (あなたとクリスマス-東條希- Christmas With You -Nozomi Tojo-)	Aina Kusuda	0:57
13.	"Anata to Christmas -Koizumi Hanayo-" (あなたとクリスマス-小泉花陽- Christmas With You -Hanyo Koizumi-)	Yurika Kubo	1:20
14.	"Anata to Christmas -Yazawa Niko-" (あなたとクリスマス-矢澤にこ- Christmas With You -Nico Yazawa-)	Sora Tokui	0:55
15.	"Mirai e Go Next!" (未来へゴー・ネクスト! Next Go to the Future!)	μ's	1:21
Total length:			19:07

DVD
No.	Title	Length
1.	"Snow Halation" (music video)	6:02

== Charts ==
Chart (2010–2011)	Peak position
Billboard Japan Top Singles	70
Japan Oricon Weekly Singles	74
