= Love Live! The School Idol Movie =

2015 Japanese animated music film

- Poster

Japanese name
- Kanji: ラブライブ！The School Idol Movie
- Directed by: Takahiko Kyōgoku
- Screenplay by: Jukki Hanada
- Based on: Love Live! by Sunrise, Lantis and Dengeki G's Magazine
- Produced by: Yūki Makimoto; Kaoru Adachi; Satoshi Hirayama
- Starring: Emi Nitta; Yoshino Nanjō; Aya Uchida; Suzuko Mimori; Riho Iida; Pile; Aina Kusuda; Yurika Kubo; Sora Tokui
- Cinematography: Daichi Nogami; Daiki Sugiyama
- Edited by: Daisuke Imai
- Music by: Yoshiaki Fujisawa
- Production companies: ASCII Media Works; Bandai Visual; Bushiroad; Lantis; Sunrise; Shochiku
- Distributed by: Shochiku
- Release date: June 13, 2015
- Running time: 99 minutes
- Country: Japan
- Language: Japanese
- Box office: $28 million

Love Live! The School Idol Movie (ラブライブ！The School Idol Movie, Rabu Raibu! The School Idol Movie) is a 2015 Japanese animated musical film. The film is part of the Love Live! School Idol Project multimedia series by Sunrise, Lantis and Dengeki G's Magazine, and is the conclusion to the 2013–2014 anime television series. The film was directed by Takahiko Kyōgoku, written by Jukki Hanada, produced by Sunrise, and distributed by Shochiku. The film was released in Japan on June 13, 2015, and licensed in North America by NIS America. The film was the 9th highest-grossing Japanese film of the year in Japan with over ¥2.8 billion and was nominated for Animation of the Year at the 39th Japan Academy Prize.

== Plot ==
The movie opens with a childhood scene of Honoka attempting to leap over a puddle, cheered on by Kotori and watched by Umi, symbolizing her determination to persevere.

Set after the second season, μ's (pronounced "muse") learns that the organizers of Love Live! are planning a third competition at the Akiba Dome. To help promote the event, μ's is invited to the United States for a TV feature. Though they have decided to disband after the third years graduate, they agree to perform as school idols until the end of the month.

While training and sightseeing in New York City, a montage set to "Hello, Hoshi o Kazoete" (Hello,星を数えて) plays. Honoka gets lost and meets a mysterious Japanese singer performing "As Time Goes By" (Japanese) / "Stars, Come to Me!" (International). The singer, who once performed with close friends but is now alone, encourages Honoka to reflect on why she sings. After safely guiding Honoka back, she disappears, leaving Honoka with her microphone and a lingering question: "Whose sake do you sing for?" The section ends with μ's performing "Angelic Angel" in Times Square and Central Park.

Back in Japan, μ's has become a nationwide phenomenon, as seen in the montage with "?← Heartbeat" (Hate na Heartbeat). Fans beg them to continue, and even Principal Minami hopes they will reinvent themselves rather than disband. Honoka struggles with the decision until A-Rise's Tsubasa invites her for a late-night talk, suggesting μ's could follow A-Rise's example and go pro.

Amid a rainstorm, Honoka again meets the mysterious singer, who asks if she has found her answer. Transported to a hill of flowers, Honoka is told she can "fly" whenever she chooses. Taking the leap, Honoka reaffirms her love for school idols. Meanwhile, Eli delivers the third years' decision to end μ's activities.

The next morning, Honoka and the others agree to one final act: a large-scale concert to celebrate all school idols. She pitches the idea to Tsubasa, who accepts. Despite mass emails, few idols respond, so μ's travels nationwide in groups of three to recruit them, with "Future Style" playing during the montage. Kotori and Anju collaborate on costumes, while Maki and Tsubasa work on the event's main song. On the night before the festival, Honoka publicly announces μ's disbandment, leaving fans saddened.

On festival day, μ's races toward Akiba, with Honoka joyfully spinning and dancing as petals drift by, symbolizing her newfound freedom. At the venue, they find countless school idols gathered, all dressed in costumes inspired by μ's. The festival opens with "Sunny Day Song," now embraced as the anthem for all school idols.

The film closes with a new school year at Otonokizaka High, where Yukiho and Alisa, now third years, carry on μ's' legacy as leaders of the Idol Research Club. In a flashback, μ's shares a quiet moment backstage before their last performance. The movie concludes with "Bokutachi wa Hitotsu no Hikari" (僕たちはひとつの光) at Akiba Dome, marking the group's heartfelt farewell.

== Production ==
The film was announced in June 2014 at the end of the second season finale of the Love Live! School Idol Project anime television series, as part of the celebration of the fifth anniversary of the franchise.

=== Music ===
Three CD singles with insert songs from the film were released. The first, released on July 1, 2015, was "Angelic Angel / Hello, Hoshi o Kazoete", and includes "Angelic Angel" by μ's and "Hello, Hoshi o Kazoete" (Hello,星を数えて) by Rin (Riho Iida), Maki (Pile) and Hanayo (Yurika Kubo). It was number-two on the weekly Oricon Singles Chart, with 82,000 copies sold, having the highest ranking and best first week sales of a Love Live! single. It sold an estimated 131,274 copies in 2015, becoming the second best-selling anime CD single of the year in Japan.

The second single, "Sunny Day Song / ?←Heartbeat", was released on July 8 and had "Sunny Day Song" by μ's and "?←Heartbeat" (Hate na Heartbeat) by Eli Ayase (Yoshino Nanjō), Nozomi Tojo (Aina Kusuda) and Nico Yazawa (Sora Tokui). It broke the franchise record for first week sales set by the previous single, with 86,000 copies; it was also number-two on the weekly Oricon Singles Chart. It sold an estimated 125,225 copies, becoming the third best-selling anime CD single of the year in Japan.

The third single, "Bokutachi wa Hitotsu no Hikari / Future Style", was released on July 15 and had "Bokutachi wa Hitotsu no Hikari" (僕たちはひとつの光) by μ's and "Future Style" by Honoka Kōsaka (Emi Nitta), Kotori Minami (Aya Uchida) and Umi Sonoda (Suzuko Mimori) It broke the franchise record for first week sales set by the second single, with 96,000 copies sold; it was also number-two on the weekly Oricon Singles Chart. It sold an estimated 124,254 copies, becoming the fourth best-selling anime CD single of the year in Japan.

Due to a licensing issue in the international version, "As Time Goes By" was replaced with an original song, "Stars, Come to Me!". Both songs were sung by the female singer (Minami Takayama).

== Release ==
In January 2015 the release date for the film was announced as June 13, 2015. It was released on home video in Blu-ray on December 15, 2015. The Limited Special Edition sold 193,769 copies on its first week, becoming the weekly number-one animation Blu-ray in the country. By January 24, 2016, it had sold 220,772 copies. During the first TV broadcast by NHK Educational TV on January 3, 2017, the viewers celebrating with tweeting with their hashtag "#lovelive", and became the #1 trending topic in Japan.

The film was released theatrically in South Korea on September 3, 2015, in the United States on September 11, 2015 and in Indonesia on October 21. As of December 2015, the film had been shown in several other countries, including Australia, Brunei, Hong Kong, Malaysia, New Zealand, the Philippines, Singapore, Taiwan, Thailand and Vietnam, and was also scheduled to be released in Canada at the start of 2016.

To commemorate the 10th anniversary of Love Live! School Idol Project anime television series, the film was released theatrically in 4DX format in Japan on March 15, 2024.

== Reception ==
=== Box office ===
The film was number-one on its opening weekend in Japan, where it grossed ¥400,235,800 and had 251,811 admissions, from 121 theaters. In its second weekend, Love Live! was topped the box office in admissions (188,000) and theater average earning ($17,558), It grossed an estimated ¥261 million, marking a 34.5% decline. The film topped the box office through its third weekend, earning ¥267,161,780 with 188,004 admissions, reaching a total gross close to ¥1.2 billion. In its fourth weekend, Love Live! grossed an estimated ¥156 million a 18% declining, making The film reached a total gross of over ¥1.4 billion and over 1 million admissions. After topping the box office reign for three consecutive weekends, Love Live! The School Idol Movie was finally overtaken in its fourth weekend by Avengers: Age of Ultron from Marvel Studios and Walt Disney Studios Motion Pictures. The film had earned ¥1.65 billion one month after release ¥1.9 billion 38 days after the release and ¥2 billion by the seventh weekend. By August 1 it had grossed over ¥2.2 billion with over 1.5 million admissions and by August 11 it was over ¥2.3 billion. By August 16, it had grossed ¥2.4 billion and by September 12, it had grossed over ¥2.53 billion, becoming the 5th highest-grossing film distributed by Shochiku since 2000. The film was the 8th highest-grossing Japanese film (together with Flying Colors) and the 6th highest-grossing anime film at the Japanese box office in 2015, with ¥2.8 billion. It grossed ¥2.86 billion ($26,163,074) in total in Japan.

The film became the anime film with most admissions in South Korea, with 86,400 as of October 13, 2015. It went on to sell 133,362 tickets and gross ₩1,013,322,500 ($943,398) in South Korea. In the United States, the film grossed $115,840. In Taiwan, it grossed $241,490. In other Asia-Pacific territories, it grossed $236,901. Combined, the film grossed $28 million worldwide.

=== Critical response ===
Nick Creamer of Anime News Network described the film as a "clear, indulgent victory lap," commending its "energetic humor, endearing character dynamics, and lively musical performances," while noting its "repetitive plotting and self-congratulatory fanservice" kept it from reaching the series' high points. Carlos Ross of THEM Anime Reviews found it to be a "thoroughly pleasant and enjoyable experience overall" for fans of the franchise, noting that while the encore performance is fun, the film is hampered by "occasionally strange pacing, questionable writing choices, [and] the disappointing overemphasis on drama queen Honoka" alongside a persistent use of substandard 3D artwork.

Onosume of Anime UK News called it a "love letter to the fans" and a joyous send-off, praising its vibrant musical numbers, heartfelt character arcs, and polished Sunrise animation, while conceding that the New York performance staging and collector's packaging fall slightly short of perfection. Randy Cordova of The Arizona Republic was more negative in his review, writing that it is "shrill, garish, confusing and badly paced" for anyone who is not a major fan of the franchise, declaring that the production suffers from "cheap-looking animation" and an off-putting color palette reminiscent of "drinking too much Pepto Bismol."

=== Awards and nominations ===
The film was second place for Best Picture at the Newtype Anime Awards 2015. It won an Award of Excellence by being nominated for Animation of the Year at the 39th Japan Academy Prize. It won the Theatrical Animation Division prize at the 2016 Tokyo Anime Award Festival.
