= Gdgd Fairies =

Japanese anime television series

- gdgd Fairies
- Promotional poster of the gdgd Fairies anime

gdgd妖精s (gudaguda fearīzu)
- Genre: Comedy, Fantasy
- Anime television series
- Directed by: Sōta Sugahara
- Written by: Kōtarō Ishidate
- Music by: Jun'ichi Inoue
- Studio: Bouncy
- Licensed by: NA: Crunchyroll
- Original network: Tokyo MX
- Original run: October 12, 2011 – December 28, 2011
- Episodes: 12
- Anime television series

gdgd Fairies (2nd series)
- Directed by: Sōta Sugahara
- Written by: Kazuyuki Osabe; Taizō Yamamoto
- Music by: Jun'ichi Inoue
- Studio: Bouncy
- Licensed by: NA: Crunchyroll
- Original network: Tokyo MX
- Original run: January 9, 2013 – March 27, 2013
- Episodes: 12 + 1
- Anime film

Gekijō-ban gdgd Yōseis tte Iu Eiga wa Dō kana…?
- Directed by: Sōta Sugahara
- Written by: Kazuyuki Osabe; Ryōichi Mori
- Studio: Bouncy
- Released: September 27, 2014
- Anime television series

gdgd men's party
- Directed by: Sōta Sugahara
- Written by: Ryōichi Mori
- Music by: Jun'ichi Inoue
- Studio: Bouncy
- Licensed by: NA: Crunchyroll
- Original network: Tokyo MX
- Original run: January 8, 2018 – March 26, 2018
- Episodes: 12

gdgd Fairies (Japanese: gdgd妖精s(ぐだぐだフェアリーズ), Hepburn: Gudaguda Fearīzu) is a Japanese CG anime television series created and animated by Sōta Sugahara. The series aired on Tokyo MX between October 12, 2011, and December 28, 2011, and was also simulcast by Crunchyroll. A special episode aired in December 2012, and a second season aired between January 9, 2013, and March 27, 2013. A spin-off series titled gdgd men's party aired between January 2018 and March 26, 2018.

== Plot ==
The series focuses on three fairies, pkpk, shrshr and krkr, who live in Fairy Forests. Although weak in magic skill, they have a special room where they can practice magic and a fountain in which they can view the outside world.

== Cast ==
pkpk (ピクピク, Pikupiku) Voiced by: Suzuko Mimori
An innocent pink haired fairy who is often intimidated by others. Her signature color is pink.
shrshr (シルシル, Shirushiru) Voiced by: Kaoru Mizuhara
A high spirited blonde fairy who is known for being a little lazy. Her signature color is light blue or yellow.
krkr (コロコロ, Korokoro) Voiced by: Satomi Akesaka
An emotionless purple haired fairy who emits poisonous fumes and has a grim outlook on life. Her signature color is orange.
