= Aya Uchida =

Japanese voice actress and singer (born 1986)

- 内田 彩
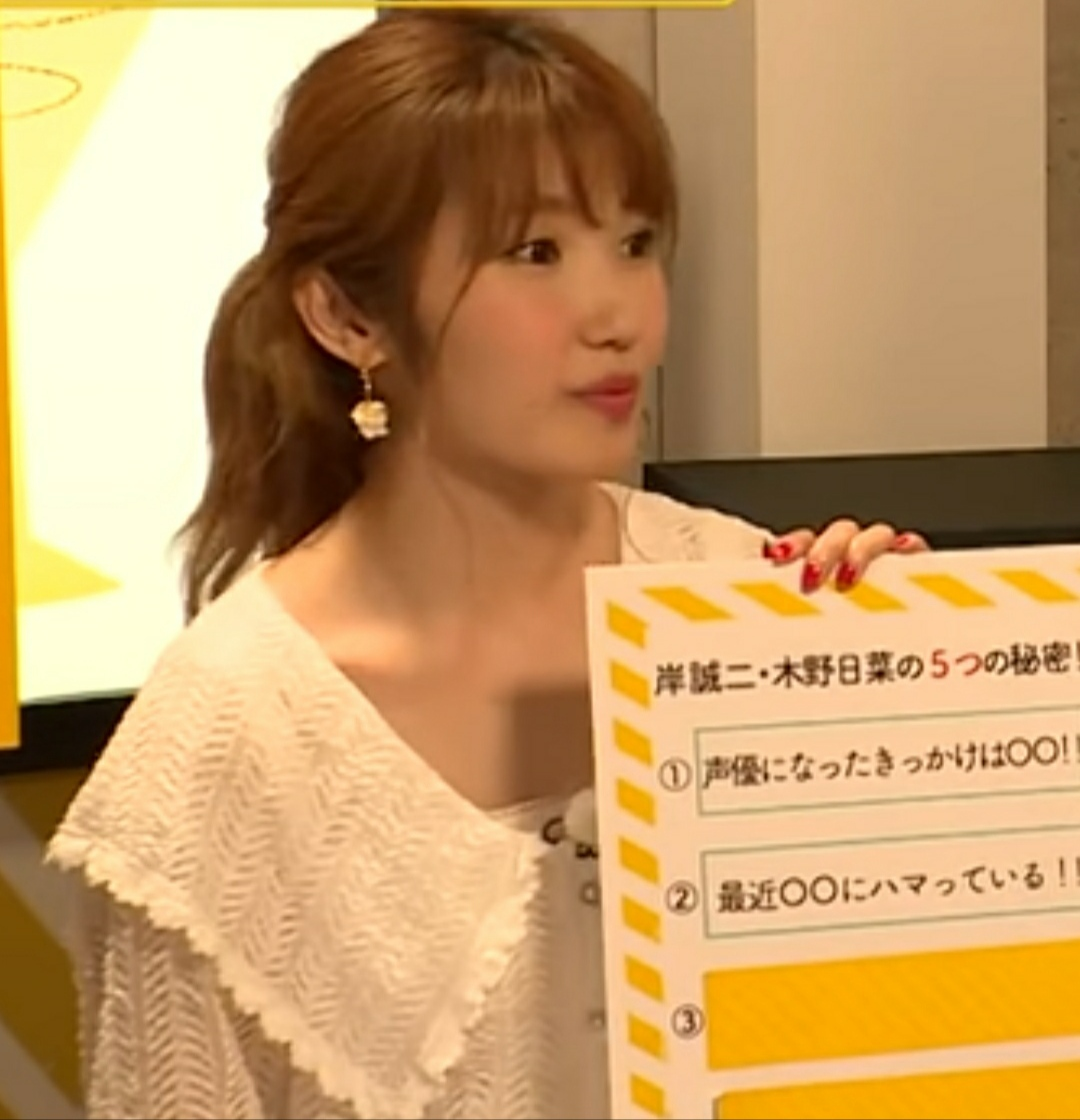
- Uchida appearing in an episode of Say You to Yo Asobi in 2018 (Age 32)
- Born: July 23, 1986 (age 40); Ōta, Gunma Prefecture, Japan
- Other name: Ucchi
- Occupations: Voice actress; singer
- Years active: 2008–present
- Agent: Across Entertainment
- Height: 158 cm (5 ft 2 in)
- Website: aya-uchida.net

Aya Uchida (内田 彩, Uchida Aya; born July 23, 1986) is a Japanese voice actress and singer. She played Kotori Minami in Love Live! School Idol Project, Kaban in Kemono Friends, Hina Yayoi in Waccha PriMagi!, and Komaru Naegi in the Danganronpa series since Danganronpa Another Episode: Ultra Despair Girls. She released the single "Sign/Candy Flavor", the song "Sign" was used as the ending theme for The Quintessential Quintuplets. Her nickname is Ucchi.

== Filmography ==
=== Television animation ===
Year	Title	Role	Other notes	Sources
2009	Kiddy Girl-and	Ascoeur		
2009	Miracle Train: Ōedo-sen e Yōkoso	Chinatsu		
2009	Sora o Miageru Shōjo no Hitomi ni Utsuru Sekai	Chikara Hidaka		
2010	Mitsudomoe	Mayumi Katou		
2010	Shimajirō Hesoka	Bowdown		
2010	Yumeiro Patissiere	Erika Hayami		
2011	Freezing	Ticy Phenyl		
2011	Mawaru-Penguindrum	Aoi		
2011	Mitsudomoe Zōryōchū!	Mayumi Katou		
2011	Rio: Rainbow Gate!	Elle Adams, Ille Adams		
2011	YuruYuri	Kaede Furutani		
2012	Recorder and Randsell	Hina-chan		
2012	So, I Can't Play H!	Urus		
2012	Space Battleship Yamato 2199	Warrant Officer Yuria Misaki		
2012	YuruYuri♪♪	Kaede Furutani		
2013	Ai Mai Mi	Mai		
2013	Devil Survivor 2: The Animation	Io Nitta		
2013	Love Live! School Idol Project season 1	Kotori Minami		
2013	Vividred Operation	Himawari Shinomiya		
2014	Love Live! School Idol Project season 2	Kotori Minami		
2014	Trinity Seven	Arin Kannazuki		
2014	Z/X Ignition	Rigel		
2015	Re-Kan!	Kogal Spirit		
2015	My Monster Secret	Shiho Shishido		
2015	Million Doll	Hinami Kamakura		
2016	Danganronpa 3: The End of Hope's Peak High School	Komaru Naegi		
2016	Izetta: The Last Witch	Bianca		
2017	Chain Chronicle	Marina		
2017	Kemono Friends	Kaban		
2018	Black Clover	Sylph/Bell		
2018	Full Metal Panic! Invisible Victory	Sachi Shinohara		
2018	Ms. Vampire Who Lives in My Neighborhood	Yū Aoki		
2018	You Don't Know Gunma Yet	Kyō Shinooka		
2018	Release the Spyce	Hatsume Aoba		
2018	The Master of Ragnarok & Blesser of Einherjar	Mitsuki Shimoya		
2019	Kemono Friends 2	Kaban		
2019	Ascendance of a Bookworm	Frieda		
2019	Kandagawa Jet Girls	Inori Misuda		
2019	Z/X Code reunion	Rigel		
2020	Infinite Dendrogram	Elizabeth S. Altar		
2020	Magia Record: Puella Magi Madoka Magica Side Story	Tsukasa Amane		
2020	Rail Romanesque	Ran		
2020	Strike Witches: Road to Berlin	Shizuka Hattori		
2021	Hortensia Saga	Kuu Morimol		
2021	Let's Make a Mug Too	Mad Deiemon, Rio Matsuse		
2021	To Your Eternity	Parona		
2021	Gunma-chan	Aoma		
2021	Waccha PriMagi!	Hina Yayoi		
2021	Magia Record: Puella Magi Madoka Magica Gaiden Season 2 -The Eve of Awakening-	Tsukasa Amane		
2021	Banished from the Hero's Party	Theodora		
2022	Engage Kiss	Shenhua Hachisuka		
2022	PuniRunes	Raburune		
2023	The Aristocrat's Otherworldly Adventure: Serving Gods Who Go Too Far	Silk		
2023	The Girl I Like Forgot Her Glasses	Asuka Kawato		
2023	Classroom for Heroes	Iona		
2024	Plus-Sized Elf	Oku, Akiho Ino		
2026	Red River	Queen Nakia		

=== Original video animation (OVA) ===
- Baby Princess 3D Paradise 0 (2011), Hotaru Amatsuka

=== Original net animation (ONA) ===
- Junji Ito Maniac: Japanese Tales of the Macabre (2023), Izumi Murakami
- Koala's Diary (2025), Koala

=== Films ===
- Strike Witches the Movie (2012), Shizuka Hattori
- Space Battleship Yamato 2199: Odyssey of the Celestial Ark (2014), Warrant Officer Yuria Misaki
- Love Live! The School Idol Movie (2015), Kotori Minami
- Trinity Seven the Movie: The Eternal Library and the Alchemist Girl (2017), Arin Kannazuki
- Trinity Seven: Heavens Library & Crimson Lord (2019), Arin Kannazuki
- Strike Witches: 501st Joint Fighter Wing Take Off! (2019), Shizuka Hattori
- Frame Arms Girl: Kyakkyau Fufu na Wonderland (2019), Innocentia
- Ganbatte Ikimasshoi (2024), Kaori Yasuda

=== Video games ===
- Shin Megami Tensei: Devil Survivor 2 (2011), Io Nitta
- Love Live! School Idol Festival (2013), Kotori Minami
- The Guided Fate Paradox (2013), Asagi (credited as "Kotori Minami")
- Bullet Girls (2014)
- Danganronpa Another Episode: Ultra Despair Girls (2014), Komaru Naegi
- Defense Witches (2014), Jill
- Omega Labyrinth (2015), Nako Mito
- Cyberdimension Neptunia: 4 Goddesses Online (2017), Bouquet / GM
- Lilycle Rainbow Stage!!! (2019), Alice Kugayama
- Kandagawa Jet Girls (2020), Inori Misuda
- Goddess of Victory: Nikke (2023), Quency

=== Mobile games ===
- Granblue Fantasy (2016), Andira
- Magia Record (2017), Tsukasa Amane & Umika Misaki
- Koekatsu (2018), Yuina Sasaki
- Dragalia Lost (2018), Melsa
- Destiny Child, Harmony Medb
- Overhit, Sophia
- Azur Lane, Centaur
- Alchemy Stars, Eicy & Ansia

=== Japanese dub ===
- And Just Like That..., Lily Goldenblatt (Cathy Ang)
- The Lego Ninjago Movie, Nya (Abbi Jacobson)
- Pitch Perfect (Parco/Happinet edition), Aubrey Posen (Anna Camp)
- Starship Troopers: Traitor of Mars, Amy Snapp
- Sydney Sailboat, Zip

== Discography ==
=== Albums ===
	Release date	Title	Package number		Oricon peak ranking
	Release date	Title	Limited edition	Standard edition	Oricon peak ranking
1	November 12, 2014	Apple Mint (アップルミント, Appuru Minto)	COZX-2001/2	COCX-1001	13
2	July 22, 2015	Blooming!	COZX-1067/8 (A); COZX-1069/70 (B)	COCX-39222	9
3	September 13, 2017	Icecream Girl	COZX-1365/6 (A); COZX-1367/8 (B)	COCX-40081	2
4	November 27, 2019	Ephemera	COZX-1597/8	COCX-41001	22
5	November 8, 2023	Music			22
6	July 23, 2025	Re:Birthday			28

=== Mini albums ===
	Release date	Title	Package number	Oricon peak ranking
1	February 10, 2016	Sweet Tears	COZX-1124/5	8
1	February 10, 2016	Bitter Kiss	COZX-1126/7	9

=== Singles ===
	Release date	Title	Package number		Oricon peak ranking
	Release date	Title	Limited edition	Standard edition	Oricon peak ranking
1	November 30, 2016	"Sumile Smile"	COZC-1262/3	COCC-17234	6
2	May 9, 2018	"So Happy"	COZC-1434/5	COCC-17449	15
3	March 6, 2019	"Sign/Candy Flavor"	COZC-1514/5 (A); COZC-1518/9 (B)		16
4	March 4, 2020	"Reverb"	COZC-1631/2	COCC-17745	31
