= Sora Tokui =

Japanese voice actress, singer, and manga artist

- 徳井 青空
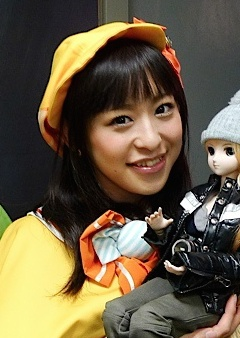
- Sora Tokui in November 2010
- Born: 26 December 1989 (age 36); Minamibōsō, Chiba, Japan
- Other names: Soramaru; Tokkun; Toku san
- Occupations: Voice actress; manga artist
- Years active: 2009–present
- Agent: Avex Pictures
- Notable work: Tantei Opera Milky Holmes as Nero Yuzurizaki; Love Live! as Nico Yazawa; Didn't I Say to Make My Abilities Average in the Next Life?! as Reina; Blend S as Hideri Kanzaki; Jujutsu Kaisen as Akari Nitta; Is the Order a Rabbit? as Maya Jōga; Arknights as Swire; Honkai: Star Rail as Hook; Kiratto Pri Chan as Suzu Kurokawa; Himitsu no AiPri as Airi Mitsuba; Umamusume: Pretty Derby as T. M. Opera O
- Height: 159 cm (5 ft 3 in)
- Musical career
- Genres: J-Pop; Anison
- Instrument: Vocals
- Years active: 2010–present

Sora Tokui (徳井 青空, Tokui Sora; born December 26, 1989 in Minamibōsō) is a Japanese voice actress, singer and manga artist who made her debut as a voice actress in 2009 as Himemiya in Weiß Survive R, in 2019 as Suzu Kurokawa in Kiratto Pri Chan and in 2024 as Airi Mitsuba in Himitsu no AiPri.

== Career ==
She is a member of the group Milky Holmes, formed by the four main voice actresses in the media franchise Tantei Opera Milky Holmes. Similarly, as Nico Yazawa, she is a member of the singer group formed by the nine main voice actresses in the media franchise Love Live! and has released singles under the fictional group name μ's. She is also part of a mini unit within the Love Live! the project called BiBi, alongside Yoshino Nanjō and Pile.

Tokui is also a manga artist whose work, including the yonkoma Mahou Shoujo Jitaku-chan, has been serialized in Otapoke magazine. Her manga Makeruna!! Aku no Gundan! has been made into an anime series. She describes herself as an otaku, and has mentioned in particular her love for Neon Genesis Evangelion and the character Asuka Langley Soryu, whom she cosplayed at a screening of Q Evangelion. She credits Yūko Miyamura, Asuka's voice actress, as her inspiration for becoming a voice actress.

In late March 2020, Tokui made her YouTuber debut with the message in the English translation, "I am interested in many things, so I want to challenge everything!"

As of late 2020, she uploaded her official Virtual YouTuber avatar.

== Personal life ==
On September 30, 2024, Tokui announced on X (formerly Twitter) that she had married a non-celebrity man.

== Filmography ==
=== Anime television ===
- Weiß Survive R (2009), Himemiya
- Tantei Opera Milky Holmes (2010), Nero Yuzurizaki
- Tantei Opera Milky Holmes: Act 2 (2012), Nero Yuzurizaki
- Chitose Get You!! (2012), Misaki
- Little Busters! (2012), Sasami Sasasegawa
- Robotics;Notes (2012), Junna Daitoku
- Love Live! (2013), Nico Yazawa
- Gargantia on the Verdurous Planet (2013), Mayta
- Fantasista Doll (2013), Katia
- Futari wa Milky Holmes (2013), Nero Yuzurizaki
- Day Break Illusion (2013), Luna Tsukuyomi
- Wanna Be the Strongest in the World (2013), Hornet
- Neppu Kairiku Bushi Road (2013), Yuzu Jijo
- Future Card Buddyfight (2014), Paruko Nanana
- Is the Order a Rabbit? (2014), Maya Jōga
- Chō-Bakuretsu I-Jigen Menko Battle Gigant Shooter Tsukasa (2014), Miruko Koide
- Love Live! Season 2 (2014), Nico Yazawa
- Unlimited Fafnir (2015), Ariella Lu
- Tantei Kageki Milky Holmes TD (2015), Nero Yuzurizaki
- Rin-ne (2015), Miho
- Danchigai (2015), Uzuki Nakano
- Is the Order a Rabbit?? (2015), Maya Jōga
- JK Meshi! (2015), Ruriko Igarashi
- Future Card Buddyfight 100 (2015), Paruko Nanana
- PriPara (2015), Brittany
- Luck & Logic (2016), Chloe Maxwell
- Bishoujo Yuugi Unit Crane Game Girls (2016), Asuka
- Future Card Buddyfight Triple D (2016), Paruko Nanana
- This Art Club Has a Problem! (2016), Kaori Ayase
- Nazotokine (2016), Hacchin
- BanG Dream! (2017), Hinako Nijikki
- Blend S (2017), Hideri Kanzaki
- Two Car (2017), Ai Maita
- Dances with the Dragons (2018), Berdrit Livy Raki
- Pop Team Epic Episode 10 (2018), Popuko
- High School DxD Hero (2018), Kunou
- Alice or Alice (2018), Kisaki
- Over Drive Girl 1/6 (2019), Kusabi
- Kiratto Pri Chan (2019), Suzu Kurokawa, Yuzuru Aoba (younger)
- Demon Lord, Retry! (2019), Yukikaze
- Didn't I Say to Make My Abilities Average in the Next Life?! (2019), Reina
- Assassins Pride (2019), Black Madea
- Rebirth (2020), Kanna
- Seton Academy: Join the Pack! (2020), Kurumi Nekomai
- Tsugu Tsugumomo (2020), Kyouka
- Princess Connect! Re:Dive (2020), Rima
- Jujutsu Kaisen (2020), Akari Nitta
- Tropical-Rouge! Pretty Cure (2021), Saki Sakuragawa, Mifuyu Harada
- Banished from the Hero's Party (2021), Nao
- PuraOre! Pride of Orange (2021), Ema Yoshiike
- Yatogame-chan Kansatsu Nikki 4 Satsume (2022), Kei Aonaji
- My One-Hit Kill Sister (2023), Gloria
- The Aristocrat's Otherworldly Adventure: Serving Gods Who Go Too Far (2023), Tifana
- Liar, Liar (2023), Suzuran Kazami
- Jujutsu Kaisen Season 2 (2023), Akari Nitta
- Helck (2023), Rococo
- Reborn as a Vending Machine, I Now Wander the Dungeon (2023), Short
- Under Ninja (2023), Noguchi
- Himitsu no AiPri (2024), Airi Mitsuba
- Plus-Sized Elf (2024), Melo
- Grendizer U (2024), Ōi
- Tasūketsu: Fate of the Majority (2024), Naito Katō
- I Have a Crush at Work (2025), Yukiko Sakura
- The Too-Perfect Saint: Tossed Aside by My Fiancé and Sold to Another Kingdom (2025), Riina
- The Strongest Job Is Apparently Not a Hero or a Sage, but an Appraiser (Provisional)! (2026), Steelia
- Hanaori-san Still Wants to Fight in the Next Life (2026), Mana Kuraishi
- The Forsaken Saintess and Her Foodie Roadtrip in Another World (2026), Rin Takanashi

=== Films ===
- Love Live! The School Idol Movie (2015), Nico Yazawa
- Umamusume: Pretty Derby – Beginning of a New Era (2024), T. M. Opera O
- The Rose of Versailles (2025), Louis Joseph
- Himitsu no AiPri The Movie: Mankai Buzzlume Live! (2026), Airi Mitsuba

=== OVA ===
- Tantei Opera Milky Holmes Summer Special, Nero Yuzurizaki
- Tantei Opera Milky Holmes Alternative ONE -Kobayashi Opera to 5-mai no Kaiga-, Nero Yuzurizaki
- Tantei Opera Milky Holmes Alternative TWO -Kobayashi Opera to Kokū no Ōgarasu-, Nero Yuzurizaki
- Umamusume: Pretty Derby – Road to the Top (2023), T. M. Opera O

=== Video games ===
2013

- The Guided Fate Paradox, Liliel (Credited as "Nico Yazawa")
- Love Live! School Idol Festival (Android/iOS), Nico Yazawa
- Hyperdevotion Noire: Goddess Black Heart, Moruu

2015

- MeiQ: Labyrinth of Death, Connie
- Senran Kagura: Estival Versus, Hanabi

2016

- Girls' Frontline, Glock 17, F2000
- Senran Kagura: Peach Beach Splash, Hanabi

2017

- Danganronpa V3: Killing Harmony, Tenko Chabashira¨
- Blue Reflection, Kei Narimiya¨
- Miniature Garden, Shibaya Sumika
- Shinobi Master Senran Kagura: New Link, Hanabi

2018

- Princess Connect! Re:Dive, Rima

2019

- Arknights, Swire
- Love Live! School Idol Festival All Stars (Android/iOS), Nico Yazawa

2020

- Magia Record: Puella Magi Madoka Magica Side Story, Tsumugi Wakana
- Guardian Tales (Android/iOS), Red Hood Elvira

2021

- Umamusume: Pretty Derby (Android/iOS), T. M. Opera O
- Blue Archive (Android/iOS), Momoi Saiba
- Counter:Side (Android/iOS/PC), Himeno Yui (Shin Jia)
- Figure Fantasy (Android/iOS), Suzumi

2023

- Goddess of Victory: Nikke, Blanc
- Honkai: Star Rail, Hook

2025

- Rusty Rabbit, Amelia
- 100% Orange Juice, Mari Popomi

== Dubbing ==
=== Live-action ===
- Pretty Little Liars: Original Sin – Imogen Adams (Bailee Madison)

=== Animation ===
- The Powerpuff Girls – Blossom
- My Little Pony: Friendship Is Magic – Applejack

== Discography ==
=== Sora Tokui ===
==== Solo Singles ====
- "Koiiro Comics", released February 2, 2016

=== Love Live! School Idol Project ===
==== Singles ====
- "Snow Halation", released December 22, 2010
- "Natsuiro Egao de 1, 2, Jump!", released August 24, 2011
- "Mahoutsukai Hajimemashita!", released May 23, 2012
- "Kaguya no Shiro de Odoritai", released February 6, 2013
- "Cutie Panther", released July 24, 2013
- "Takaramonozu", released January 29, 2014
- "Colorful Voice", released May 8, 2014
- "Trouble Busters", released December 24, 2014
- "Psychic Fire", released January 20, 2016
