= Suzuko Mimori =

Japanese voice actress

- 三森 すずこ
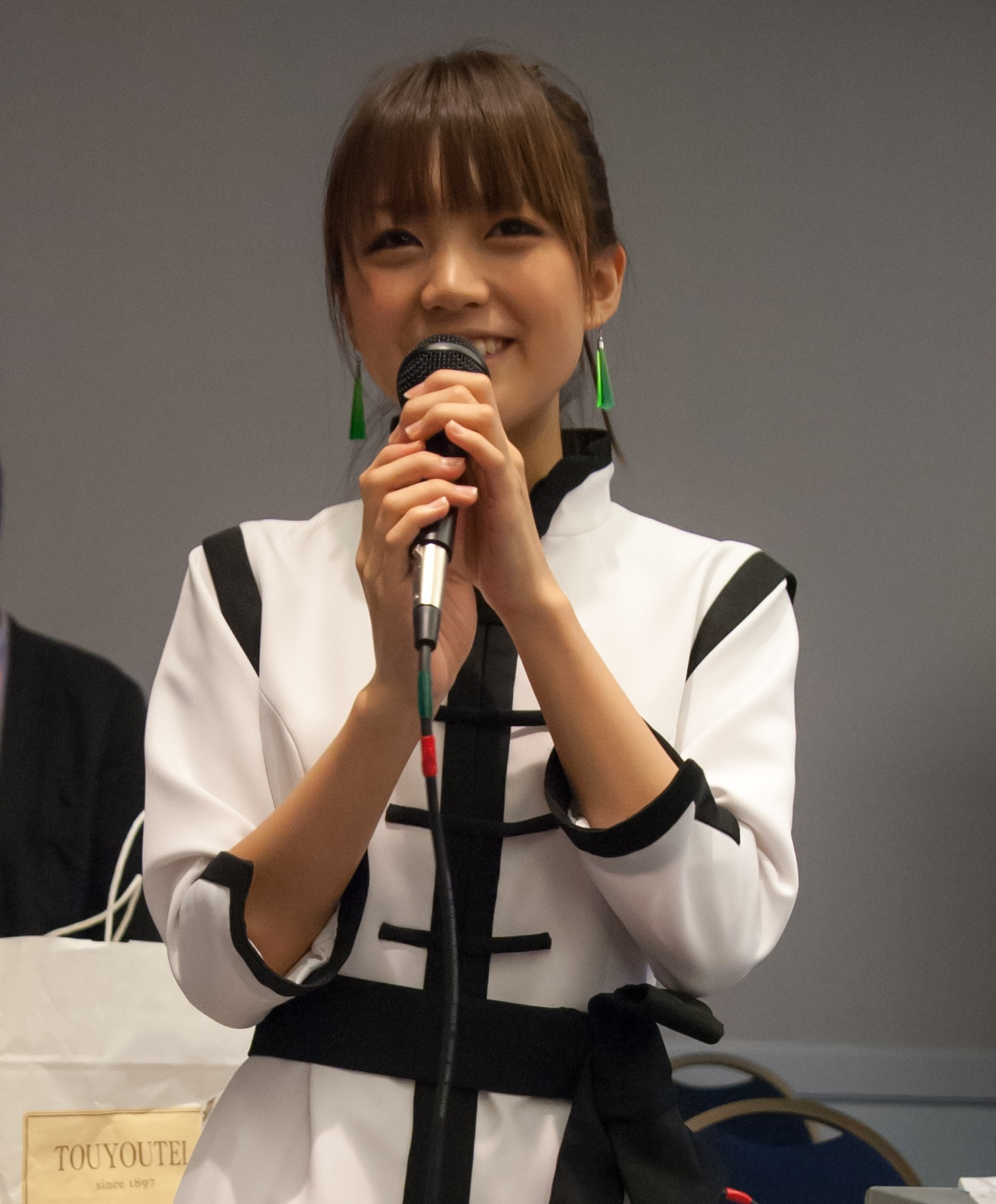
- Mimori at Anime Weekend Atlanta in September 2012
- Born: Suzuko Kurokawa (黒川 鈴子); June 28, 1986 (age 40); Tokyo, Japan
- Occupations: Actress; voice actress; singer
- Years active: 2010–present
- Agent: HiBiKi Cast
- Height: 160 cm (5 ft 3 in)
- Spouse: Kazuchika Okada (m. 2019)
- Children: 2
- Relatives: Fumio Kurokawa
- Musical career
- Genre: J-pop
- Instrument: Vocals
- Years active: 2013–present
- Label: Pony Canyon
- Website: mimorin.com

Suzuko Kurokawa (黒川 鈴子, Kurokawa Suzuko), known professionally as Suzuko Mimori (三森すずこ, Mimori Suzuko; born June 28, 1986), is a Japanese actress and singer. She is represented by HiBiKi Cast. She voiced Umi Sonoda in Love Live!, Hikari Kagura in Revue Starlight, Anju Shiratori/Hakuccho in Kiratto Pri Chan and Asumi Fuurin/Cure Earth in Healin' Good Pretty Cure.

== Early life ==
Suzuko Mimori was born Suzuko Kurokawa on June 28, 1986. During her childhood, Mimori aspired to become a musical actress and dancer. After attending a children's musical with her parents, she developed an interest in singing and dancing. She began studying ballet at the age of seven and initially aimed to become a ballerina. Ballet was a familiar part of her life, as she watched recitals with friends who practiced ballet and often heard her father's collection of ballet music at home. She attended an all-girls integrated junior and senior high school.

Influenced by her younger sister, she saw Les Misérables at the Imperial Theatre during junior high school, which led to her interest in musicals. She joined her school's musical club midway through junior high school and continued participating during high school. She was later inspired by the Takarazuka Revue production The Rose of Versailles 2001 – Oscar and André, which motivated her to pursue admission to the Takarazuka Music School. She advanced to the final round of the entrance examination but was not accepted. Although her sister was a fan of voice actress Mayumi Iizuka and subscribed to Seiyū Grand Prix, Mimori herself showed little interest in voice acting at the time. She was skilled in both English and music and considered pursuing a career related to English if her aspirations in performing arts did not succeed.

Mimori studied jazz dance, tap dance, and vocal performance at the Mariart Studio and also received vocal training. Before dropping out to pursue her voice acting career, she attended Komazawa University.

== Career ==
At age 17, Mimori made her first stage appearance under her birth name with Mariart in June 2006 as part of the ensemble cast in Me and My Girl at the Imperial Theatre, the venue where she first encountered musicals. She continued to perform mainly in musicals and stage productions under the stage name "Suzuko Kurokawa". During this time, she felt a sense of urgency about potentially remaining only an ensemble or background dancer. She had her first leading role in the stage production Kimi ni Sasageru Uta – A Song For You.

During one performance in which Mimori played the main character, Bushiroad president Takaaki Kidani was in attendance. Through an introduction from her uncle, who worked at Bushiroad at the time, she was offered a role in Tantei Opera Milky Holmes. Prior to that, Mimori attended Komazawa University, but dropped out to concentrate on her career. When her contract with her previous agency expired, she transferred to Hibiki, a Bushiroad subsidiary, and began her voice acting career in 2008, under the stage name Suzuko Mimori.

From July to October 2009, she was a member of the singing group Cutie Pai as Suzy (which is the diminutive form of her given name). She appeared on a variety of television series and in musical activities as one of the four lead members of the Milky Holmes voice acting unit, which is named after the series. From 2011 to 2016, Mimori was a member of Lily white, a sub-unit in the Love Live! multimedia project, alongside Aina Kusuda and Riho Iida.

As a member of the Milky Holmes voice acting unit, she appeared in various musical and variety television programs.

In 2015, she won the Singing Award at the 9th Seiyu Awards as a member of μ's.

On December 31, 2015, she appeared as a member of μ's on the 66th NHK Kōhaku Uta Gassen, marking her first appearance on the program.

From July to October 2016, she held her first nationwide solo tour, Mimori Suzuko Live Tour 2016 "Grand Revue", performing songs from her albums in non-fixed order. She prepared for the tour with intensive strength training, later remarking jokingly that it "didn't help much" and that lung capacity seemed more important.

On April 30, 2017, the trading card set Voice Actor Card Collection VOL.01 Suzuko Mimori – Gyugyutto Mimorin was released, produced jointly by editorial teams of Monthly Bushiroad, B.L.T., and B.L.T. Voice Girls.

On January 13, 2018, she confirmed her relationship with professional wrestler Kazuchika Okada on Twitter following reports by Tokyo Sports. On April 12, 2019, the couple announced their marriage through their respective social media accounts. On May 30, 2022, she announced her first pregnancy, and on August 19 reported the birth of their first son. On November 12, 2024, she announced the birth of their second son.

On May 2, 2024, she announced via her official X account that she would relocate her base of activities to the United States beginning in the summer while continuing her work as a voice actress and artist.

=== Balancing voice acting and stage acting ===
After the start of her voice acting career, Mimori temporarily stepped away from stage performances. She returned to the stage for the first time in five years in Cardfight!! Vanguard ~Virtual Stage~, performed from January 5 to 11, 2016, portraying the role of Kourin, whom she had previously voiced in the television anime series. A sequel production followed in 2017.

Since 2017, she has continued to appear as Hikari Kagura in Shōjo☆Kageki Revue Starlight, a media mix project that combines musical theatre and animation. When she was first approached by Bushiroad president Takaaki Kidani—who had originally guided her into voice acting—she initially declined, believing she had already concluded her journey with stage performance. After being asked to reconsider, she ultimately decided to accept the role.

From November 2019 to January 2020, she appeared as Anita (double cast) in the Japanese-language Season 1 production of the Broadway musical West Side Story. Following her involvement in Revue Starlight, she has actively pursued both her voice acting and stage acting careers.

In a 2021 interview, Mimori expressed that while she has a "dream" of continuing to work as a voice actress for the rest of her life, her dream as a stage performer will not be complete until she stands in the principal "center, position zero" role at the Imperial Theatre, the place where her stage career began.

== Personal life ==
She was raised in a household where her father, who was almost unusually fond of opera and classical music, and her mother, who enjoyed somewhat edgy rock and rhythm & blues, constantly played their respective favorites—Georg Friedrich Händel from her father's side, and Janis Joplin and Jimi Hendrix from her mother's side. Businessman Fumio Kurokawa, who served as president of Dex Entertainment and as a vice president of Bushiroad, is her cousin.

Just before joining Hibiki, she attended a stage play starring Mitsuko Mori and felt admiration, thinking, "I want to make acting my lifelong work just like she did." She proposed to her agency that she would like to use the stage name "Mori Suzuko," but they were reluctant, saying, "Mori won't show up in search results." Later, the suggestion "Mimori," incorporating the number "3," which she liked, was readily accepted. The nickname "Mimorin" was also conceived at this point. (Friends from her school days and shortly after she became a voice actress call her "Suzu," while co-performers and fans who know her as "Mimori Suzuko" mainly call her "Mimorin" or "Mimo-san.")

In Seiyū Grand Prix, she has presented her own illustrations and a column inspired by reader submissions under the pseudonym "Okuzushi M. Romi." The name "Okuzushi Romi" is a reverse reading of her stage name "Mimori Suzuko" when written in Roman letters.

In the final episode of TV Kanagawa's Kids Gekijō!!, she performed three roles: herself, Sherlock Shellingford, and the Nekomimi Kuma-san character from the Kids Nekomimi Corner—partly because Tantei Opera Milky Holmes was being featured. A parody of "Nekomimi Kuma-san" also appears in the anime Tantei Opera Milky Holmes.

When she appeared as a secret guest at Sora Tokui's talk event "Miracle Aozora Night ~Aozora, Shūrai~" held at Shinjuku Loft PlusOne, she performed the Nekomimi Kuma-san theme song.

She was a classmate and friend of actress and singer Sayaka Kanda during junior high school. On August 28, 2015, during the first day of "Animelo Summer Live 2015 -THE GATE-," they reunited as members of μ's (Mimori) and TRUSTRICK (Kanda), respectively. When Kanda passed away on December 18, 2021, Mimori commented, "We hardly had chances to meet, but as classmates aiming for the same path, she was someone who always inspired me. Why? I can't believe it. I wanted to see her shine even more. Seeing her do so would have made me think, 'I have to work hard too,' and I wanted to feel that again. Please rest in peace... my deepest condolences."

Through her attempt to enter the Takarazuka Music School, she also has friends among former Takarazuka Revue members, such as Aya Amika, former top musumeyaku of the Snow Troupe.

She cites Emiri Katō, with whom she co-starred in works such as YuruYuri, as a close senior she admires.

Her special skills include dance (jazz, tap, ballet). Her hobbies are cooking, watching stage plays, and singing. Her motto is "Keizoku wa chikara nari" ("Perseverance is strength").

In April 2019, Mimori announced her marriage to New Japan Pro-Wrestling wrestler Kazuchika Okada. In May 2022, it was announced that Mimori was expecting her first child. In August 2022, she gave birth to a baby boy. In May 2024, it was announced on her official X account that she would be moving to the United States that summer. In November, she gave birth to a second baby boy.

== Filmography ==
=== Anime series ===
Year	Title	Role	Notes	Ref.
2010	Kids Gekijo!!	Nekomimi Kuma-san		
2010	Tantei Opera Milky Holmes	Sherlock "Sheryl" Shellingford		
2010	B Gata H Kei	schoolgirl, tourist, foreign girl		
2011	Cardfight Vanguard!!	Kourin Tatsunagi		
2011	gdgd Fairies	pkpk		
2011	Tantei Opera Milky Special	Sherlock "Sheryl" Shellingford		
2011	YuruYuri	Himawari Furutani		
2012	World War Blue	Alyssa Nel		
2012	Wooser's Hand-to-Mouth Life	Sherlock Shellingford		
2012	The Ambition of Oda Nobuna	Motoyasu Matsudaira		
2012	Cardfight!! Vanguard: Asia Circuit	Kourin Tatsunagi		
2012	Kamisama Kiss	Nanami Momozono, Yukiji		
2012	Queen's Blade Rebellion	Eilin		
2012	Symphogear	girl 1, trio schoolgirl, lost sister		
2012	Tantei Opera Milky Holmes: Act 2	Sherlock "Sheryl" Shellingford		
2012	Tantei Opera Milky Holmes: Alternative	Sherlock "Sheryl" Shellingford		
2012	Teekyū!	Kanae Shinjō		
2012	Hiiro no Kakera	Kiyono Takara		
2012	Hiiro no Kakera: Dai Ni Shō	Kiyono Takara		
2012	Bodacious Space Pirates	Belinda Percy		
2012	Btooom!	Himiko		
2012	YuruYuri♪♪	Himawari Furutani		
2012	Poyopoyo Kansatsu Nikki	Moe Satō		
2012	Lagrange: The Flower of Rin-ne	Michi Kondō		
2012	Lagrange: The Flower of Rin-ne Season 2	Michi Kondō		
2013	Outbreak Company	Myuseru Foaran		
2013	Infinite Stratos 2	Kanzashi Sarashiki		
2013	Cardfight!! Vanguard: Link Joker	Kourin Tatsunagi		
2013	gdgd Fairies Season 2	pkpk		
2013	GJ Club	Shion Sumeragi		
2013	Wanna be the Strongest in the World	Chinatsu Suzumoto		
2013	Senran Kagura	Suzune [Rin]		
2013	Teekyū! 2	Kanae Shinjō		
2013	Teekyū! 3	Kanae Shinjō		
2013	Neppu Kairiku Bushi Road	Rin		
2013	Futari wa Milky Holmes	Sherlock "Sheryl" Shellingford		
2013	Freezing Vibration	Amelia Evans		
2013	Love Live!	Umi Sonoda		
2013	Magical Suite Prism Nana	Itaru Washioka/Heat Nana		
2014	Cardfight!! Vanguard: Legion Mate	Korin Tatsunagi		
2014	Future Card Buddyfight	Hanako Mikado, schoolgirl, Akatsuki Kisaragi		
2014	Fairy Tail	Hisui E. Fiore		
2014	Majimoji Rurumo	Rurumo Maji Mojiruka		
2014	Magica Wars	Rei Amesetsu		
2014	Momo Kyun Sword	Suika		
2014	Love Live! 2nd Season	Umi Sonoda		
2014	Yuki Yuna Is a Hero	Mimori Tōgō		
2015	Ultimate Otaku Teacher	Koyomi Hiiragi		
2015	Highschool DxD Born	Ophis		
2015	Kamisama Kiss◎	Nanami Momozono		
2015	Lance N' Masques	Alice Cleveland		
2015	Tantei Kageki Milky Holmes TD	Sherlock "Sheryl" Shellingford		
2015	Tokyo Ghoul √A	Roma Hoito		
2015	Digimon Adventure tri.	Sora Takenouchi		
2015	Comet Lucifer	Marvina Anians		
2015	PriPara	Cera		
2016	Luck & Logic	Logigraph		
2016	Rin-ne	Suzu		
2016	Nobunaga no Shinobi	Oichi no kata		
2016	Danganronpa 3: The End of Hope's Peak Academy	Hiyoko Saionji		
2016	Kamiwaza Wanda	Mirai		
2016	Tiger Mask W	Haruna Takaoka		
2017	Chaos;Child	Hinae Arimura		
2017	Akiba's Trip: The Animation	Miumiu		
2017	Masamune-kun's Revenge	Neko Fujinomiya		
2017	Kemono Friends	Ezo red fox	Eps. 9–10, 12	
2017	BanG Dream!	Yuri Ushigome		
2017	Hina Logi ~from Luck & Logic~	Yayoi Tachibana		
2017	Yuki Yuna is a Hero: Washio Sumi Chapter	Sumi Washio		
2017	Yuki Yuna is a Hero: Hero Chapter	Mimori Tōgō		
2018	Isekai Izakaya "Nobu"	Shinobu Senke		
2018	Pop Team Epic	Pipimi	Episode 10	
2018	Zoids Wild	Hot and sour soup		
2018–21	Kiratto Pri☆Chan	Anju Shiratori/Hakuccho		
2018	Revue Starlight	Hikari Kagura		
2018	SSSS.Gridman	Namiko		
2018–19	Million Arthur	Bodach		
2019	Hulaing Babies	Mona		
2019	Hensuki: Are You Willing to Fall in Love with a Pervert, as Long as She's a Cutie?	Okita-sensei		
2020	Hulaing Babies☆Petit	Mona		
2020	Healin' Good Pretty Cure	Asumi Furin/Cure Earth, Ferremin		
2020	Dragon's Dogma	Salai		
2021	Odd Taxi	Rui Nikaidо̄		
2021	Joran: The Princess of Snow and Blood	Sawa Yukimura		
2021	Yuki Yuna is a Hero: The Great Mankai Chapter	Mimori Tōgō		
2021	PuraOre! Pride of Orange	Eri Yamanaka		
2021	180-Byō de Kimi no Mimi o Shiawase ni Dekiru ka?	Shūsui Kagami		
2022	Date A Live	Maria		
2022	The Eminence in Shadow	Gamma		
2023	Masamune-kun's Revenge R	Neko Fujinomiya		

=== Original video animation ===
Year	Title	Role	Notes	Ref.
2010	Snow Halation	Umi Sonoda		
2011	T.P. Sakura 〜Taimuparadin Sakura〜	Sakura Yoshino		
2011	BabyPrincess 3D Baradaisu0	Seika		
2011	Natsuiro Egao de 1, 2, Jump!	Umi Sonoda		
2012	Lagrange: The Flower of Rin-ne	Michi Kondō		
2012	See Me After Class	Risa Takabane		
2012	Stand Up! Vanguard	Maria Kagami		
2013	Kamisama Kiss	Nanami Momozono		
2014	Yuru Yuri Nachuyachumi!	Himawari Furutani		

=== Original net animation ===
Year	Title	Role	Notes	Ref.
2022	Pokémon Evolutions	Green		

=== Anime films ===
Year	Title	Role	Notes	Ref.
2015	Love Live! The School Idol Movie	Umi Sonoda		
2017	Fairy Tail: Dragon Cry	Hisui E. Fiore		
2020	Digimon Adventure: Last Evolution Kizuna	Sora Takenouchi		
2021	Healin' Good PreCure: The Movie	Asumi Fuurin/Cure Earth		
2021	Revue Starlight: The Movie	Hikari Kagura		
2022	Odd Taxi: In the Woods	Rui Nikaidо̄		
2023	Gridman Universe	Namiko		
2023	Pretty Cure All-Stars F	Asumi Furin/Cure Earth		
2024	Ōmuro-ke	Himawari Furutani		
2024	Ganbatte Ikimasshoi	Mai Ono		

=== Video games ===
Year	Title	Role	Notes	Ref.
2010	Tantei Opera Milky Holmes	Sherlock Shellingford		
2011	Disgaea 4: A Promise Unforgotten	Fuka Kazamatsuri		
2012	Super Danganronpa 2: Sayonara Zetsubō Gakuen	Hiyoko Saionji		
2012	Tantei Opera Milky Holmes 2	Sherlock Shellingford		
2013	Love Live! School Idol Festival	Umi Sonoda		
2014	Date A Live: Arusu Install	Maria Arusu & Marina Arusu		
2014	Love Live! School idol paradise	Umi Sonoda		
2014	Chaos;Child	Hinae Arimura		
2015	Xuccess Heaven Rebellion	Tsumugi Tsukina		
2016	Girls' Frontline	M1A1 Type 92		
2017	Super Bomberman R	Pretty Bomber		
2017	Magia Record: Puella Magi Madoka Magica Side Story	Konomi Haruna		
2017	Kirara Fantasia	Match		
2017	Yuki Yuna is a Hero: Hanayui no Kirameki	Mimori Tōgo, Sumi Washio		
2018	Warriors Orochi 4	Athena		
2018	Onmyoji	Hiyoribo		
2018	Shoujo Kageki Revue Starlight RE LIVE	Hikari Kagura		
2019	Love Live! School Idol Festival All Stars	Umi Sonoda		
2019	maimai DX	Derakkuma		
2021	Alchemy Stars	Kafka, Michael		
2021	Pokémon Masters EX	Selene		
2021	Genshin Impact	Sangonomiya Kokomi		
2021	Arknights	Fartooth		
2021	Azur Lane	Namiko, IJN Unzen		
2022	Granblue Fantasy	Galleon		
2022	Goddess of Victory: Nikke	Rapunzel		
2025	Granblue Fantasy Versus: Rising	Galleon		

=== Tokusatsu ===
Title	Year	Role	Notes	Ref.
2017	Ultraman Geed	R.E.M	Voice / Physical role (Episode 19)	
2018	Ultraman Geed The Movie	R.E.M	Voice	
2020	Ultra Galaxy Fight: The Absolute Conspiracy	Ultrawoman Marie	Voice role	

=== Dubbing ===
Year	Title	Role	Original Performer	Notes	Ref.
2013–2019	My Little Pony: Friendship Is Magic	Pinkie Pie	Andrea Libman		
2015	My Little Pony: Equestria Girls	Pinkie Pie	Andrea Libman		
2015	My Little Pony: Equestria Girls – Rainbow Rocks	Pinkie Pie	Andrea Libman		
2015	My Little Pony: Equestria Girls – Friendship Games	Pinkie Pie	Andrea Libman		
2016	The Angry Birds Movie	Stella	Kate McKinnon		
2017	My Little Pony: Equestria Girls – Legend of Everfree	Pinkie Pie	Andrea Libman		
2017	Chennai Express	Meena	Deepika Padukone	Family Gekijo Dub	
2018	Genius	Fernande Olivier	Aisling Franciosi	Season 2	
2018	My Little Pony: The Movie	Pinkie Pie	Andrea Libman		
2019	Manifest	Michaela Stone	Melissa Roxburgh		
2020	My Country: The New Age	Han Hee-jae	Kim Seol-hyun (AOA)		
2021	White Snake	Xiao Bai			
2022	Clifford the Big Red Dog	Owen Yu	Izaac Wang		
2022	Eraser: Reborn	Rina Kimura	Jacky Lai		
2023	Re:STAR	Chen Ya			
2024	IF	Blossom	Phoebe Waller-Bridge		

== Discography ==
=== Singles ===
No.	Release date	Title	Identification number		Oricon chart position
No.	Release date	Title	Limited Edition	Standard Edition	Oricon chart position
1st	April 3, 2013	Aitai yo... Aitai yo! (会いたいよ...会いたいよ!, I Want to See You... I Want to See You!)	PCCG-1342	PCCG-70179	10
2nd	July 3, 2013	Yakusokushiteyo! Isshodayo! (約束してよ?一緒だよ!, Promised! Together!)	PCCG-1357	PCCG-70188	12
3rd	October 23, 2013	Yunibā Pēji (ユニバーページ, Universality Page)	PCCG-1371	PCCG-70195	5
4th	August 14, 2014	Seīppai, Tsutaetai! (せいいっぱい、つたえたい!, With my best effort, I want to tell!)	PCCG-1413	PCCG-70217	11
5th	October 21, 2015	Light for Knight (ライト・フォー・ナイト)	PCCG-1491	PCCG-70203	6
6th	May 25, 2016	Xenotopia (ゼノトピア)	PCCG-1521	PCCG-70316	8
7th	April 12, 2017	Saki Wafuhana/Koi wa Illusion (サキワフハナ/恋はイリュージョン, Blooming Japanese Flower/Love is an Illusion)	PCCG-01576	PCCG-70361	7
8th	October 11, 2017	Egao no Kimi e (エガオノキミへ, A Smile for You)	PCCG-01623	PCCG-70406	4

=== Limited edition singles ===
Release date	Title	Sales methods	Identification number
February 5, 2014	Gurōrī! (グローリー!, Glory!)	CD	SCCG-00001
February 5, 2014	Gurōrī! (グローリー!, Glory!)	Digital Download	
September 10, 2014	Hāmonia! (ハーモニア, Harmonia)	CD	SCCG-70001
September 10, 2014	Hāmonia! (ハーモニア, Harmonia)	Digital Download	
December 12, 2015	Happī Happī Kurisumasu (ハッピーハッピークリスマス, Happy Happy Christmas)	CD	SCCG-SCCG.00007

=== Albums ===
No.	Release date	Title	Identification number	Oricon chart position
1	April 2, 2014	Suki (好きっ, Love)	PCCG-1388（Blu-ray） PCCG-1389（DVD） PCCG-1390（CD）	9
2	April 8, 2015	Fantasic Funfair	PCCG-01466（Blu-ray） PCCG-01467（DVD） PCCG-01468（CD）	5
3	September 7, 2016	Toyful Basket	PCCG.01543 (Blu-Ray); PCCG.01544 (DVD); PCCG.01545 (CD)	6
4	July 27, 2018	tone.	PCCG-01697 (Blu-Ray); PCCG-01698 (DVD); PCCG-01699 (CD)	17
5	February 20, 2019	holiday mode		16

=== Mini Album ===
Release date	Title	Identification number
February 20, 2019	holiday mode	PCCG-01737 (Blu-ray) PCCG-01738 (DVD) PCCG-01739 (CD)

=== Video ===
Release date	Title	Code	
Release date	Title	BD	DVD
August 7, 2013	みもりんといっしょ! 〜カムオン ベトナム〜	PCXP-50158	PCBP-52255
November 26, 2014	好きっ三森すずこ LIVE TOUR 2014 『大好きっ』	PCXP-50249	PCBP-52306
November 25, 2015	三森すずこ 2nd LIVE 2015『Fun!Fun!Fantasic Funfair!』	PCXP-50358	PCBP-52384
March 15, 2017	Mimori Suzuko Live Tour 2016 "Grand Revue" Final at Nippon Budokan	PCXP-50458(limited edition), PCXP-50459	PCBP-53317
December 20, 2017	Mimori Suzuko Live 2017「Tropical Paradise」	PCXP-50468	PCBP-53322
November 28, 2018	MIMORI SUZUKO 5th Anniversary Live「five tones」	PCXP-50608	PCBP-53764

== Books ==
=== Photo-books ===
- (2013) Mimorinn (Ponikyan Books) (みもりんっ（ぽにきゃんBOOKS) (Pony Canyon, Photographer: Masafumi Nakayama) ISBN 978-4-901637-95-4
