= Pile (singer) =

Japanese singer and voice actress (born 1988)

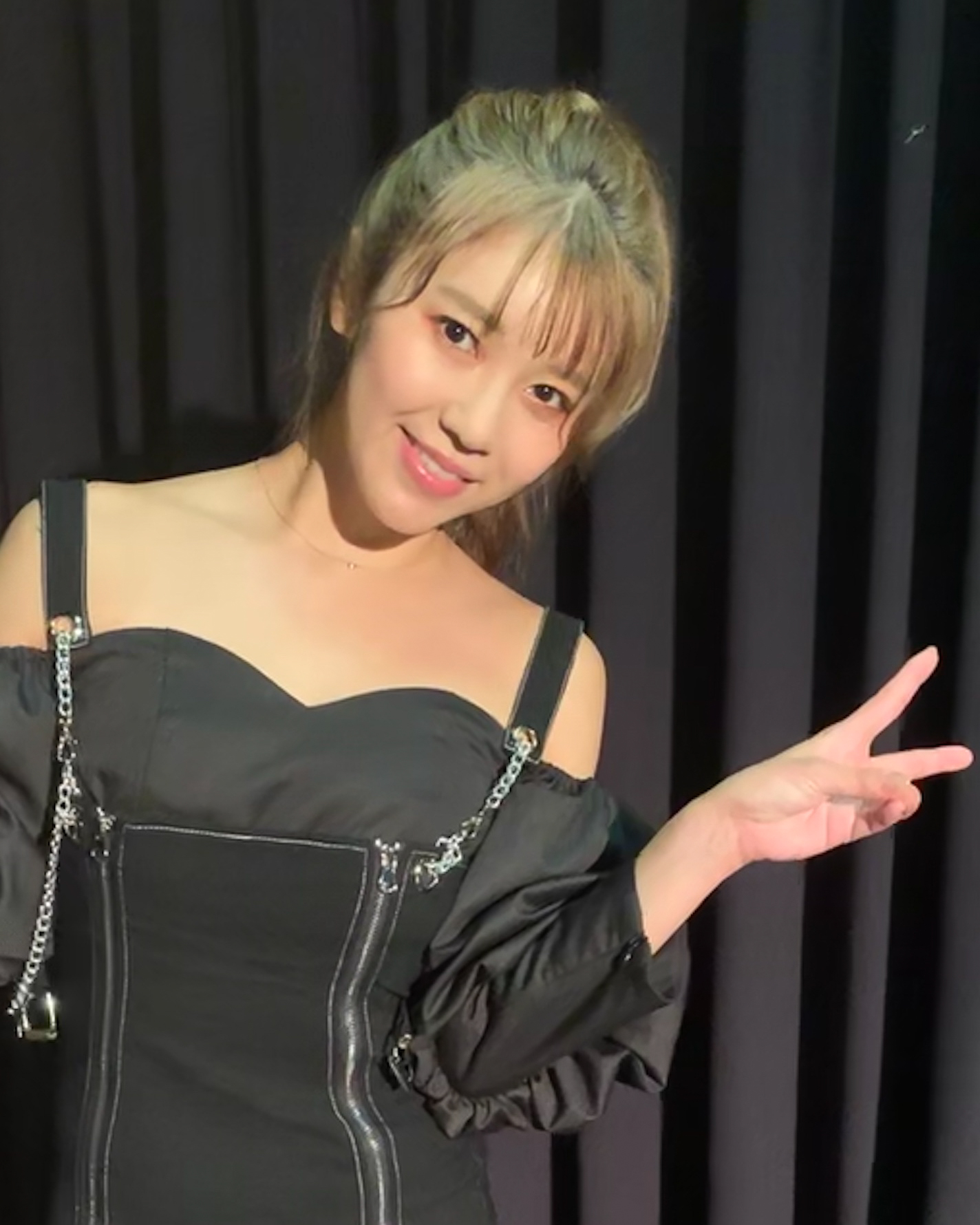
- Pile at a promotion for her 10th single, "Quasurf", in 2019 (Age 31)
- Born: Eriko Hori; 2 May 1988 (age 38); Tokyo, Japan
- Occupations: Singer; actress; voice actress
- Years active: 2005–present
- Agent: Spacey Music Entertainment (a division of Nippon Columbia)
- Musical career
- Genres: J-Pop; anison
- Instrument: Vocals
- Labels: Colourful Records; Lantis Records
- Website: pile.asia

Eriko Hori (堀 絵梨子, Hori Eriko; born 2 May 1988), better known by her stage name Pile, is a Japanese singer, actress and voice actress from Tokyo. Her first roles were minor parts in TV series and films during 2006. She debuted as a singer after she was selected in a 2006 Japan-wide audition and she made her voice acting debut in the Love Live! School Idol Project series in 2010.

== Musical career ==
In 2006, Hori was chosen from a total of 700 applicants in the Japan-wide Asian Dolls Audition. She later wrote that she wanted to be seen as "warm and enveloping, an artist who can be loved by everyone", so she chose her stage name Pile after the pile towels are made from. In October 2007, she debuted as a singer with the indie single "Your is All..."; this song was the opening theme for the third season of the drama TV series Ikari Oyaji Ai no Sekki Youtaikyoku. In 2008, two of her songs were included in Dancemania albums, including "Flower", which was included in Hime Trance Best.

Following several Love Live! releases reaching the top of the Oricon charts, Pile and her co-stars have had more success with their own music releases. (Pile's second solo character album, Love Live! Solo Live! from μ's Scarlet Princess, reached No. 31 on the Oricon Albums Chart.) She and Love Live! co-star Aina Kusuda (the voice of Nozomi Tōjō) formed a duo, Please&Secret, in 2013. They have released two singles and an album, as well as a photo book entitled Girl Meets Girl. In June 2014, she and another Love Live! voice actress Riho Iida (the voice of Rin Hoshizora) formed the duo 4to6 (the name referring to the time between the end of classes and returning home in Japanese schools), and their first single was released in August 2014.

In 2014, Pile released her first single for the Victor Entertainment label, "Densetsu no FLARE", which was used as an ending theme for the anime series Tenkai Knights. Her first album for a major label, Jewel Vox, was released on the Tower Records label in March 2015. Her second single for a major label, "Kimi ga Kureta KISEKI", served as the ending theme to the anime series Duel Masters VSR. Pile made an appearance at the Cosplay Mania anime convention in Manila, Philippines in October 2015. Her single "Dream Trigger" served as the opening theme to the second season of the anime series World Trigger. She embarked on an Asian tour in 2017, with stops in Singapore, Bangkok, and Kuala Lumpur. She released a compilation album titled The Best of Pile on 16 August 2018.

== Acting career ==
In 2005, Hori appeared as a minor character in the TV series 1 Litre no Namida, and in 2006 she appeared in Karera no Umi VII, and the films Ōkoku, Shiroi Asa no Koi, and Tokyo Real.

In 2010, Pile made her voice acting debut for the Love Live! project, a joint project between Kadokawa Corporation's ASCII Media Works publishing label and the Sunrise animation studio, as Maki Nishikino. Maki is one of the main characters of the series, a member of the idol group μ's. Pile has featured in her role in a two-season anime television series, anime music videos, CDs, rhythm games, and an animated film, among others. She is also part of a sub-unit within the Love Live! project, BiBi, alongside Yoshino Nanjō (Eli Ayase) and Sora Tokui (Nico Yazawa). The voice actresses who played members of μ's put on four live concerts between 2013 and 2014, including at Saitama Super Arena, and toured Japan in 2015. She also voiced Frunetti Renzuka in the 2013 video game The Guided Fate Paradox as part of a partnership with Love Live!, credited as Maki Nishikino (CV: Pile). She is the voice of Cinderella in the 2014 pachislot video game Cinderella Blade 2.

Her Love Live! role has attracted attention to Pile, and created a large base of fans for her. The idol news site GirlsNews called her "currently the most talked-about singer/seiyuu" after the second season of the anime series.

== Personal life ==
Hori was born and grew up in Tokyo, where she went to Shinagawa Women's Academy in Shinagawa Ward for middle school and high school. She attended a college in Tokyo. Her father is Japanese and her mother is Korean. She is fluent in Korean and proficient in English. She studied ballet, hip-hop, and jazz dance while in high school, as well as baton twirling and theater.

== Discography ==
=== Singles ===
- "Your is All..." (24 October 2007)
- "Etarnal" (digital-only release, 2007)
- "Flower" (digital-only release, 2008)
- "Love&Joy" (digital-only release, 2009)
- "Densetsu no Flare" (3 December 2014), No. 18 on Oricon Singles Chart
- "Kimi ga Kureta Kiseki" (22 April 2015), No. 15 on Oricon Singles Chart
- "Dream Trigger" (4 November 2015), No. 7 on Oricon Singles Chart
- "Melody" (18 May 2016), No. 8 on Oricon Singles Chart
- "Subarashiki Sekai" (28 December 2016), No. 8 on Oricon Singles Chart
- "Kizuna Hero" (16 August 2017), No. 23 on Oricon Singles Chart
- "BJ" (2 May 2018)

=== Albums ===
- Pile Lovely Box (dōjin release, 29 December 2013)
- Pile Lovely Box 2 (dōjin release, 15 August 2014)
- Jewel Vox (4 March 2015), No. 19 on Oricon Albums Chart
- PILE (16 March 2016), No. 12 on Oricon Albums Chart
- Tailwind(s) (26 April 2017), No. 14 on Oricon Albums Chart

=== Collaborations ===
Please&Secret (with Aina Kusuda)

Singles:

- "O.P.E.N Fantasy" (18 September 2013), #42 on Oricon Singles Chart
- "Kimi no Kokoro ni..." (16 April 2014), No. 23 on Oricon Singles Chart
- "Ashita e Saku Hana" (14 December 2014), No. 22 on Oricon Singles Chart

Album:

- Anniversary (25 March 2015)

4to6 (with Riho Iida)

Singles:

- "Watashi no Tokei wa Gyakukaiten!" (20 August 2014), #29 on Oricon Singles Chart

== Filmography ==
=== Anime television series ===
- Love Live! (2013), Maki Nishikino
- Love Live! Second Season (2014), Maki Nishikino
- World Trigger (2014), Kokoa Takeda
- Kochinpa! (2015), Aira
- King's Game The Animation (2017), Ria Iwamura

=== OVAs ===
- Snow halation (2010), Maki Nishikino
- Natsuiro egao de 1, 2, Jump! (2011), Maki Nishikino
- Mo gyutto "love" de sekkinchu (2012), Maki Nishikino
- Wonderful Rush (2012), Maki Nishikino
- Music S.T.A.R.T!! (2013), Maki Nishikino

=== Anime films ===
- Love Live! The School Idol Movie (2015), Maki Nishikino

=== Live-action TV series ===
- 1 Litre no Namida (2005), student
- Karera no Umi VII (2006)

=== Live-action films ===
- Ōkoku (2006)
- Shiroi Asa no Koi (2006)
- Tokyo Real (2006), clerk

=== Video games ===
- Love Live! School Idol Festival (2013), Maki Nishikino
- The Guided Fate Paradox (2013) Frunetti Renzuka (Credited as "Maki Nishikino" (Pile))
- Love Live! School Idol Paradise, (2013), Maki Nishikino
- Cinderella Blade 2 (2014), Cinderella
- Rage of Bahamut (2015), Lidi
