= Emi Nitta =

Japanese voice actress

- 新田 恵海
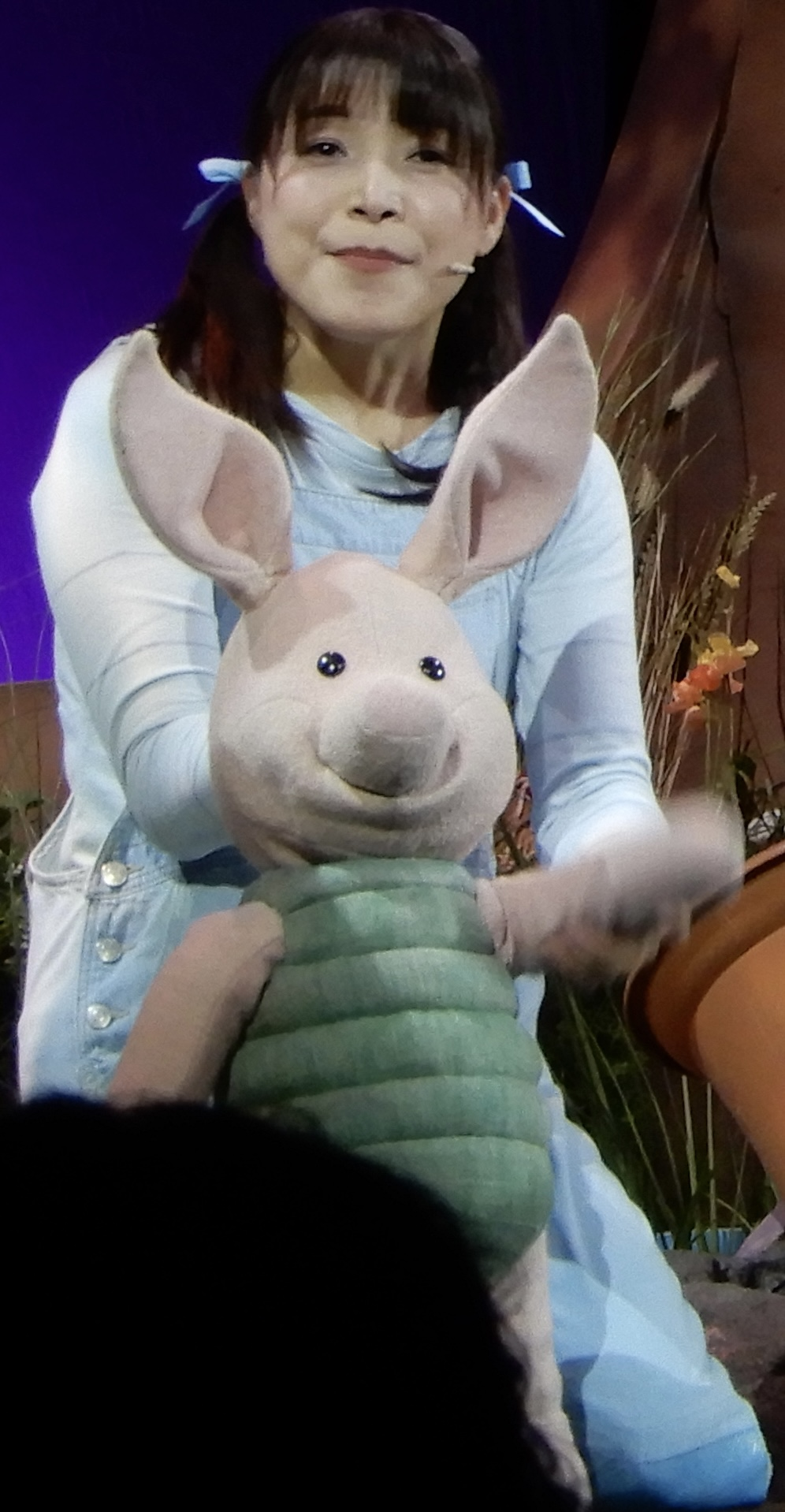
- Nitta (performing as Piglet) during the Winnie the Pooh: The New Musical Adaptation at the Yokohama Kannai Hall in 2025
- Born: December 10, 1985 (age 40); Nagano, Nagano Prefecture, Japan
- Occupations: Voice actress; singer
- Years active: 2010–present
- Height: 153 cm (5 ft 0 in)
- Website: emi-nitta.net

Emi Nitta (新田 恵海, Nitta Emi; born December 10, 1985) is a Japanese voice actress and singer from Nagano Prefecture. She became a voice actress after passing an audition organized by talent agency S-inc. She officially transferred to Difference on 1 September 2017. Some of her major roles are Honoka Kōsaka in Love Live! and Tokoha Anjō in Cardfight!! Vanguard G. She made her anime voice acting debut as Ricca Morizono in Da Capo III. She made an appearance at the Bangkok Comic Con in July 2014.

== Career ==
In September 2014, she had her debut as a solo singer with the release of her first single.

In February 2015, Nitta's talent agency announced she would be suspending activities for two months to receive treatment for her vocal cord polyps. She returned to work mid-April after non-invasive treatment.

On December 1, 2025, she left Difference and became a freelancer.

== Personal life ==
Nitta was born in Nagano Prefecture. As well as singing, she also plays the piano. Her hobbies include visiting cafes, karaoke, and studying dinosaurs.

== Filmography ==
=== Anime television ===
- Uta no Prince-sama (2011), Female high school student (ep 1); Girl (ep 3)
- T.P. Sakura - Time Paladin Sakura (2011), Kotori Shirakawa
- Horizon in the Middle of Nowhere (2011), Malga Naruze
- Horizon in the Middle of Nowhere II (2012), Malga Naruze
- Da Capo III (2013), Ricca Morizono
- I Couldn't Become a Hero, So I Reluctantly Decided to Get a Job (2013), Elsa Crucial
- Love Live! School Idol Project (2013), Honoka Kōsaka
- Love Live! School Idol Project 2nd Season (2014), Honoka Kōsaka
- Locodol (2014), Miyako Mima
- Cardfight!! Vanguard G (2014), Tokoha Anjou
- Tantei Opera Milky Holmes TD (2015), Marine Amagi
- My Monster Secret (2015), Akari Kōmoto
- Cardfight!! Vanguard G: GIRS Crisis (2015), Tokoha Anjou
- Cardfight!! Vanguard G: Stride Gate (2016), Tokoha Anjou
- Phantasy Star Online 2: The Animation (2016), Silva
- Caligula (2018), Sweet-P
- Okojo to Yamane (2018), Okojo
- Irodorimidori (2022), Serina Akesaka

=== Dubbing roles ===
- Arctic Dogs, Jade (original voice: Heidi Klum)
- Blanka (2017), Blanka (Cydel Gabutero)
- Deep (2018), Alice (Lindsey Alena)
- Down a Dark Hall, Catherine "Kit" (AnnaSophia Robb)
- Help, I Shrunk My Parents, Ella Borsig (Lina Hüesker)
- Help, I Shrunk My Teacher, Ella Borsig (Lina Hüesker)
- The House of Magic (2019), Thunder (Brianne Siddall)
- Jack and the Cuckoo-Clock Heart, Miss Acacia
- Just a Breath Away, Anna (Olga Kurylenko)
- My Fair Lady (2017), Yoo Geum-bi (Heo Jung-eun)
- My Only One, Kim Do-ran (Uee)
- The Nut Job 2: Nutty by Nature, Andie (original voice: Katherine Heigl)
- The Breadwinner, Parvana / Aatish (original voice: Saara Chaudry)
- The Legend of 1900 (2020 Blu-Ray edition), The Girl (Mélanie Thierry)
- A Discovery of Witches (2021), Miriam Shephard (Aiysha Hart)
- The Father (2021), Laura/Lucy (Imogen Poots)
- Littlest Pet Shop (2022), Pepper Clark (Tabitha St. Germain)
- The Gilded Age (2022), Peggy Scott (Denée Benton)

=== Movies ===
- Love Live! The School Idol Movie (2015), Honoka Kōsaka

=== Theatre ===
- Legally Blonde (2017-2019), Vivienne Kensington

=== Video games ===
- T.P. Sakura - Time Paladin Sakura (2011), Kotori Shirakawa
- Fairy Fencer F (2013), Ethil
- The Guided Fate Paradox (2013), Kuroiel Ryusaki (Credited as "Honoka Kōsaka")
- Ring Dream Joshi Pro-Wres Taisen (2013), Mutsumi Sawa
- Love Live! School Idol Festival (2013), Honoka Kōsaka
- Love Live! School Idol Paradise (2014), Honoka Kōsaka
- Atsumete! Trump Musume Reaction (2014), narration
- Ayakashi Gohan (2014), Momo
- Uchi no Hime-sama ga Ichiban Kawaii (2014), Princess Lilico
- Girls × Magic (2014), Sakura Aoyagi
- Sky Lore (2014), Olivia
- Robot Girls Z Online (2014), Liking
- Chaos Rings III (ケイオスリングス Keiosu Ringusu III) (2014), (Singer)
- Stella Glow (2015), Mordimort
- Caligula (2016), Sweet-P
- Superdimension Neptune vs. Sega Hard Girls (2016), Segami
- Love Live! School Idol Festival All Stars (2019), Honoka Kōsaka

== Discography ==
=== Albums ===
	Release date	Title	Package number		Oricon peak ranking
	Release date	Title	Limited edition	Standard edition	Oricon peak ranking
1	October 21, 2015	Emusic	EMTN-10008/9	EMTN-10007	7
2	May 16, 2018	Emusic 32: Meets You	EMTN-10019/20	EMTN-10021	17

=== Singles ===
	Release date	Title	Package number		Oricon peak ranking
	Release date	Title	Limited edition	Standard edition	Oricon peak ranking
1	September 10, 2014	"Egao to Egao de Hajimaru yo!" (笑顔と笑顔で始まるよ!)	EMTN-10002	EMTN-10001	12
2	February 18, 2015	"Tankyū Dreaming" (探求Dreaming)	EMTN-10004	EMTN-10003	15
3	February 18, 2015	"Next Phase"	EMTN-10006	EMTN-10005	12
4	February 17, 2016	"Meiyaku no Kanata" (盟約の彼方)	EMTN-10011	EMTN-10010	14
5	April 19, 2017	"Rocket Heart"	EMTN-10015	EMTN-10014	13
6	March 25, 2020	"Sing Ring"		XNST-10021/B	27

Albums (Love Live! School Idol Project/Festival)
Title	Release date
Honnori Honokairo! (ほんのり穂乃果色!, Faint Honoka Color)	January 25, 2012
"Someday of My Life"	April 25, 2012
Yume Naki Yume wa Yume Janai (夢なき夢は夢じゃない)	March 22, 2013
Shiawase Iki no Smiling! (シアワセ行きのSMILING!)	June 20, 2014

== Live concerts ==
Live concerts
Title	Date	Location
Emusic: Hajimari no Basho (EMUSIC〜始まりの場所〜)	November 8, 2015	Tokyo Dome City Hall (東京ドームシティーホール)
Live 2016 East Emusic: Tsunagu Merodī (LIVE 2016 EAST EMUSIC～つなぐメロディー～)	June 4, 2016	Pacifico Yokohama National Convention Hall of Yokohama (パシフィコ横浜 国立大ホール)
Live 2016 West Emusic: Tsunagu Merodī (LIVE 2016 WEST EMUSIC～つなぐメロディー～)	July 31, 2016	Kobe International House (神戸国際会館 こくさいホール)
Trace of Emusic: The Live	August 8, 2017	Nakano Sun Plaza (中野サンプラザ)
Trace of Emusic: The History	August 9, 2017	Nakano Sun Plaza
