= Riho Iida =

Japanese actress & singer

- 飯田 里穂
- Born: 26 October 1991 (age 34); Saitama Prefecture, Japan
- Other name: Rippi
- Occupations: Actress, voice actress and gravure idol, singer
- Years active: 2002–present
- Agent: Houeishinsha
- Height: 1.57 m (5 ft 2 in)
- Children: 2

Riho Iida (飯田 里穂, Iida Riho; born 26 October 1991 in Saitama) is a Japanese ex-child model-turned-actress, voice actress and singer. Her nickname is Rippi. She voiced Amari Katasumi in Idol Land PriPara.

== Career ==
Iida came into the spotlight when she was 11 years old, appearing on the Tensai Terebi Kun MAX (天才てれびくんMAX) series on NHK Educational TV in 2002. Since then she starred in many movies and TV series. She was also a model of a famous lolita gravure magazine Pure Pure. She played the leading role in the film Shougaiken gibu no okurimono (障害犬ギブのおくりもの), which won a prize at the Japan Educational Film Festival. Her first photobook Pool (プール, Pūru)in 2003 became the top-selling photobook in Japan.

She plays one of the main characters in the Love Live! School Idol Project anime and game project, Rin Hoshizora. The success of Love Live! contributed to an increase in exposure of her career. In 2014 she formed the duo group 4to6 with her co-star Pile (voice of Maki Nishikino). They released their first single in August 2014. She is a member of a mini unit in the Love Live! project, Lily White, alongside Aina Kusuda (voice of Nozomi Toujou) and Suzuko Mimori (voice of Umi Sonoda).

Her song "Aoi Honō Syndrome" (青い炎シンドローム, Blue Flame Syndrome) is used as the ending theme to the 2017 anime television series Digimon Universe: Appli Monsters. Her song "Itsuka Sekai ga Kawaru Made" (いつか世界が変わるまで; lit. "Someday Until The World Changes") is used as the ending theme to the 2018 anime television series Boarding School Juliet.

== Personal life ==
Iida announced her marriage to a non-celebrity man on 1 January 2022. On 25 December 2024, she announced her pregnancy. She gave birth to twins in April 2025.

== Filmography ==
=== Films ===
Year	Name	Kanji/Nihongo	Role	Notes	Ref
2001	Hitorine	ひとりね			
2002	Shougaiken Gibu no okurimono	障害犬ギブのおくりもの	Sakie		
2003	Seirei nagashi	精霊流し			
2004	Photo Frame	フォトフレーム			

=== TV Series / TV Movies ===
Year	Name	Kanji/Nihongo	Role	Network	Notes	Ref
1999–2003	Tensai TV kun Wide	天才てれびくんワイド		NHK		
2000	*Oyajii	オヤジぃ。	Young Suzu Kanzaki	TBS		
2000	Hyakunen no Monogatari	百年の物語	Freddie's girl	TBS		
2001	Zukkoke Trio 3	ズッコケ三人組3		NHK	Ep. 12	
2001	Ougon no Inu	黄金の犬	Aya Matsushita	TV Tokyo		
2001–2002	Wagamanma Kitchin	わがまんまキッチン		TV Asahi		
2003	Okusama A	奥さまA	Wakana Kimura	NBN		
2003	Musashi	大河ドラマ 『武蔵』	Kogiku	NHK		
2003–2011	Tensai TV kun MAX	天才てれびくんMAX		NHK		
2007	Sexy voice and Robo	セクシーアンドボイスロボ	Classmate	NHK		
2007	Tantei Gakuen Q	探偵学園Q	Madoka Sasaki	Nippon TV	Ep. 1	

=== TV anime ===
Year	Name	Kanji/Nihongo	Role	Network	Notes	Ref
2013–2014	Love Live! School Idol Project	ラブライブ! School idol project	Rin Hoshizora	Tokyo MX, TVA, ytv, BS11	Seasons 1-2	
2015	Re-Kan!	レーカン!	Kana Uehara	TBS, CBC, TUT, Sun TV, BS-TBS		
2015	Venus Project -Climax-	VENUS PROJECT -CLIMAX-	Ruka Sovagasky	Tokyo MX		
2017	ēlDLIVE	エルドライブ【ēlDLIVE】	Veronica Borowczyk	Tokyo MX, FBS, ytv, STV, CTV, BS11		
2017	Clione no Akari	クリオネの灯り	Yuna Nagino	AT-X, Tokyo MX, Sun TV, GYT, RNB, RNC, MMT, BS Fuji, FCT		
2017	Urahara	うらはら	Sayumin	Tokyo MX, BS Fuji, AT-X		
2018	Boarding School Juliet	寄宿学校のジュリエット	Shizuka Shishi	JNN		
2019	Kiratto Pri☆Chan	キラッとプリ☆チャン	Hoshi-nee	TV Tokyo, BS Japan, AT-X		
2020–2021	King's Raid: Successors of the Will	ぼくのとなりに暗黒破壊神がいます。	Elise	TV Tokyo		
2020	Odd Taxi	オッドタクシー	Shirakawa	TV Tokyo, AT-X		
2022	World's End Harem	終末のハーレム	Akira Tōdō	AT-X, Tokyo MX, BS Fuji		
2024	Dahlia in Bloom	魔導具師ダリヤはうつむかない ～今日から自由な職人ライフ～	Irma Nuvolari	TBA		

=== Anime films ===
Year	Name	Kanji/Nihongo	Role	Notes	Ref
2015	Love Live! The School Idol Movie	ラブライブ！The School Idol Movie	Rin Hoshizora		
2022	Odd Taxi: In the Woods	映画 「オッドタクシー イン・ザ・ウッズ」	Shirakawa		

=== Web Anime ===
Year	Name	Kanji/Nihongo	Role	Notes	Ref
2016	Kaiju Girls	怪獣娘(かいじゅうがーるず)	Aki Miyashita / Agira		
2021–2024	Idol Land PriPara	アイドルランドプリパラ	Amari Katasumi		

=== Web Drama ===
Year	Name	Kanji/Nihongo	Role	Network	Notes	Ref
2017	Ultraman Orb: The Origin Saga	ウルトラマンオーブ THE ORIGIN SAGA	Pertel	Amazon Video		

=== Video games ===
Year	Name	Role	Notes	Ref
2013	Love Live! School Idol Festival	Rin Hoshizora		
2014	Omega Quintet	Otoha		
2017	Shin'yaku Eien no Aselia - The Spirit of Eternity Sword-	Myuugi Fanaan		
2018	Onsen Musume: Yunohana Collection	Suika Hanamaki		
2019	Love Live! School Idol Festival - All Stars	Rin Hoshizora		

=== Live-action ===
Year	Title	Role	Original actor	Notes	Ref
2013	The House of Magic	Maggie	Shanelle Gray		
2017	Anna and the Apocalypse	Lisa	Marli Siu		
2017	The Wedding Invitation	Ryann	Camille Guaty		
2017	The Breadwinner	Shauzia/Deliwar	Soma Chhaya		
2018	Legend of the Ancient Sword	Wen Renyu	Victoria Song		
2018	Mid90s	Dabney	Katherine Waterston		
2018	More than Blue	Song Yuan-Yuan/Cream	Camille Guaty		
2018	ReBoot: The Guardian Code	Tamra/Enigma	Sydney Scotia		
2019-2020	Beautiful Love, Wonderful Life	Kim Seol-ah	Jo Yoon-hee		
2022	The Medium	Mink	Narilya Gulmongkolpech		
2023	Voltes V: Legacy: Super Electromagnetic Edition	Zandra	Liezel Lopez		
2023	The Bricklayer	Kate	Nina Dobrev		

=== Radio ===
Year	Name	Role	Notes	Ref
Date unknown	Rippy Rainbow Party	NIKKEI		

== Works ==
=== Photobooks/DVDs ===
- 2003: SWEET (SWEET 飯田里穂)
- 2003: Pool (プール―飯田里穂写真集) ISBN 4-88641-887-2
- 2004: Crawl (飯田里穂2nd写真集「クロール」) ISBN 4-7778-0044-X
- 2004: Chiyohime Senmki (千代姫戦鬼)
- 2005: Photo Frame (フォトフレーム)
- 2006: En-Ei (飯田里穂3rd写真集｢遠泳｣) ISBN 4-7778-0241-8
- 2012: Kitto Zutto (きっと☆ずっと)

=== CDs ===
- 2002: Tentere neko damasii ～天てれ猫だましぃ～ MTK5th
- 2002: Tentere uta makura ～天てれ歌まくら～ MTK4th
- 2003: Go! Go! Tamagodon (Go!Go!たまご丼)
- 2003: Tentere jou karubi ～天てれ上カルビ～ MTK6th
- 2003: Tentere big bun ~MTK The7th ～天てれビッグバン～
- 2004: MTK the 8th
- 2015: rippi-rippi 2015
- 2016: "KISS! KISS! KISS!" 2016
- 2016: "Kataomoi Sekkin" (片想い接近)
- 2016: rippi‐holic
- 2016: "Aoi Honoo Syndrome" (青い炎シンドローム)

=== Magazines ===
- 2002: Juvenile Vol.2 and 3
- 2002-2006: Pure 2 (pure☆pure) Vol.10~36
