= Aina Kusuda =

Japanese voice actress and singer

- 楠田 亜衣奈
- Born: February 1, 1989 (age 37); Chiba Prefecture, Japan
- Other name: Kussun
- Occupations: Voice actress; singer
- Years active: 2010–present
- Agent: Just Pro
- Height: 150 cm (4 ft 11 in)
- Website: aina-kusuda.net

Aina Kusuda (楠田 亜衣奈, Kusuda Aina; born February 1, 1989) is a Japanese voice actress and singer from Chiba Prefecture. Kusuda is currently affiliated with Just Pro. Kusuda is best known as Nozomi Toujou in Love Live! School Idol Project series, and has worked with the other Love Live! girls in singing multiple songs that have charted on Oricon. Kusuda's other major roles include Suko in Million Doll and Rose in Rilu Rilu Fairilu. Her nickname is "Kussun".

== Career ==
Prior to entering the anime industry, Kusuda worked in a maid cafe in Akihabara called Cafe la vie en rose. Kusuda decided to become a voice actress after seeing a stage performance of Junko Takeuchi (the voice of Naruto Uzumaki). Kusuda made her debut as a voice actress as Nozomi Tojo in the media franchise Love Live!, and she separately formed the duo unit, Please&Secret, with co-star Pile, who voiced Maki Nishikino. In 2013, Kusuda joined the idol unit Tabikare Girls, which released its first single that November. Kusuda released a CD on November 6, 2013, together with a new JTB Music Unit called "Tabi College Girls" (タビカレガールズ), together with Yui Watanabe, Rikako Yamaguchi, Rika Nishimori, and Mami Sumi.

She is also as a member of a mini unit in Love Live! project series, Lily White, alongside Riho Iida (voice of Rin Hoshizora) and Suzuko Mimori (voice of Umi Sonoda).

== Filmography ==
=== Television anime ===
Title	Year	Role	Notes	Source
Inumarudashi	2011	Kindergartner		
Penguindrum	2011	Adults, children		
Gon	2012	Frog		
Arpeggio of Blue Steel	2013	Student B		
Uta no☆Prince-sama♪ maji LOVE 2000%	2013	Children		
Karneval	2013	Nurse		
Love Live!	2013	Nozomi Tojo		
Leo Friends: The Tale of Sparkly Friends	2013	Female employee		
Ojarumaru	2014	Bicycle	17th series episode 69 "The Talkative Tools" (おしゃべりな道具たち Oshaberi na Dōgu-tachi)	
Girl Friend Beta	2014	Eri Minaguchi		
Hamatora	2014			
GATE	2015	Delilah		
Futsū no Joshikōsei ga Locodol Yattemita	2014	Kana Mikoze (Yui Mikoze's younger sister, Does not appear in staff roll)		
PriPara	2014	Sadako		
Super Radical Gag Family	2014	Yūta Ōsawagi		
Love Live! 2nd Season	2014	Nozomi Tojo		
Re:␣Hamatora	2014	Female High School Student A, Female Announcer, Child A		
Nyuru Nyuru!! Kakusen-kun	2015	Nyururin		
Million Doll	2015	Sūko		
Rilu Rilu Fairilu	2016	Rose		
Fairy Tail	2018	Zeref Dragneel (young)		

=== Theatrical animation ===
Title	Year	Role	Notes	Source
Love Live! The School Idol Movie	2015	Nozomi Tojo		

=== OVA ===
Title	Year	Role	Notes	Source
Snow Halation	2010	Nozomi Tojo		
Natsuiro Egao de 1, 2, Jump!	2011	Nozomi Tojo		
Mogyutto "LOVE" de Sekkin Chuu!	2012	Nozomi Tojo		
Wonderful Rush	2012	Nozomi Tojo		
Mighty Lady: The Series	2012	Operator		

=== Games ===
Title	Year	Role	Notes	Source
Girl Friend Beta	2012	Eri Minaguchi		
The Guided Fate Paradox	2013	Sherieru Ayanokoji		
Love Live! School Idol Festival	2013	Nozomi Tojo		

== Discography ==
=== Singles ===
Year	Title	Peak Oricon chart position
2018	Happy Thinking! (ハッピーシンキング！)	16

=== Albums ===
Year	Title	Peak Oricon chart position
2015	First Sweet Wave	5
2016	Next Brilliant Wave	3
2017	Karenda no Koibito (カレンダーのコイビト)	18
2018	Ai Nanda! (アイナンダ！)	35
2019	The Life	15

=== Please&Secret ===
With Pile

Year	Title	Peak Oricon chart position
2013	O.P.E.N FANTASY	42
2014	Kimi no kokoro ni... (きみのココロに...)	23
2014	Ashita e saku hana (あしたへ咲く花)	22
