= Love Live! School Idol Project =

Japanese multimedia project

- Promotional image featuring the main characters of Love Live! School Idol Project. Clockwise from the center: Honoka, Umi (lower left), Kotori, Maki, Nozomi, Eli, Rin, Hanayo and Nico.

ラブライブ! School idol project (Rabu Raibu! Sukuru Aidoru Purojekuto)
- Genre: Comedy; Musical; Slice of life
- Created by: Hajime Yatate (story); Sakurako Kimino (concept)
- Manga
- Written by: Sakurako Kimino
- Illustrated by: Arumi Tokita
- Published by: ASCII Media Works
- Magazine: Dengeki G's Magazine; Dengeki G's Comic
- Original run: January 2012 – present
- Volumes: 5
- Anime television series
- Directed by: Takahiko Kyōgoku
- Produced by: Satoshi Hirayama; Yūki Makimoto; Kaoru Adachi; Shigeru Saito (Season 1)
- Written by: Jukki Hanada
- Music by: Yoshiaki Fujisawa
- Studio: Sunrise
- Licensed by: Crunchyroll (streaming); AUS: Madman Entertainment; NA: NIS America (former); UK: MVM Films
- Original network: Tokyo MX, TVA, ytv, BS11
- English network: NA: Mnet America
- Original run: January 6, 2013 – June 29, 2014
- Episodes: 26
- Light novel

Love Live! School Idol Diary
- Written by: Sakurako Kimino
- Illustrated by: Akame Kiyose; Natsu Otono; Yūhei Murota
- Published by: ASCII Media Works
- Original run: May 30, 2013 – present
- Volumes: 12
- Original video animation
- Directed by: Takahiko Kyōgoku
- Studio: Sunrise
- Released: November 27, 2013
- Runtime: 15 minutes
- Manga

Love Live! School Idol Diary
- Written by: Sakurako Kimino
- Illustrated by: Masaru Oda
- Published by: ASCII Media Works
- Magazine: Dengeki G's Comic
- Original run: June 2014 – present
- Volumes: 4
- Video game

Love Live! School Idol Paradise
- Developer: Dingo Inc.
- Publisher: Kadokawa Games, ASCII Media Works
- Genre: Rhythm
- Platform: PlayStation Vita
- Released: JP: August 28, 2014
- Other
- Love Live! The School Idol Movie (sequel); Love Live! School Idol Festival (video game)
- icon

Love Live! School Idol Project (Note: Japanese: ラブライブ! School idol project, Hepburn: Rabu Raibu! Sukuru Aidoru Purojekuto; also referred simply as Love Live! (ラブライブ!)) is a Japanese multimedia project co-developed by ASCII Media Works' Dengeki G's Magazine, music label Lantis, and animation studio Sunrise. It is the first multimedia project in the Love Live! franchise. The project revolves around a group of nine schoolgirls who become idols in order to save their school from shutting down. It launched in the August 2010 issue of Dengeki G's Magazine, and went on to produce music CDs, anime music videos, two manga adaptations, and video games.

A 13-episode anime television series produced by Sunrise, directed by Takahiko Kyōgoku, and written by Jukki Hanada aired on Tokyo MX in Japan between January and March 2013, with a second season airing between April and June 2014. An animated film titled Love Live! The School Idol Movie was distributed by Shochiku and released in June 2015. A follow-up project focusing on a new set of idols, titled Love Live! Sunshine!!, launched in 2015.

== Plot ==
Honoka Kōsaka is a teenager who attends Otonokizaka Academy (音ノ木坂学院, Otonokizaka Gakuin). When the school is scheduled to be closed due to a lack of applicants, Honoka becomes determined to save it. She goes to UTX, where her younger sister planned to go for high school, and sees a crowd watching a music video of A-Rise, UTX's school idol group. Learning that school idols are popular, Honoka and her friends decide to follow A-Rise's footsteps and start their own school idol group called μ's (ミューズ, Myūzu; pronounced "muse") to attract new students. Once they successfully prevent Otonokizaka Academy from closing, the girls from μ's set their sights higher. They participate in Love Live, the ultimate school idol competition featuring the best groups in the country. Despite winning the competition, the girls from μ's disband soon after for their own personal reasons, and because the third-years are graduating.

== Characters ==
Where appropriate, the plot descriptions mentioned below refer to the anime television series. Other parts of the franchise, such as the manga and novel series, feature some variations in the storyline.

=== μ's ===
Group logo

Honoka Kōsaka (高坂 穂乃果, Kōsaka Honoka)
Voiced by: Emi Nitta (Japanese); Marieve Herington (English)
Honoka is a second-year student at Otonokizaka Academy. Her family works in a wagashi shop named Homura. She has a cheerful personality, and very determined, never giving up on anything, to the point of usually overexerting herself – which can prove costly at times. She is shown to be lazy and reluctant to do work but is highly driven when it comes to her school idol activities. Her hobbies include swimming and collecting stickers. In the manga, she was a part of the kendo club. She is the leader of μ's, and is seen taking the center position in most of the group's songs. She later succeeds Eli as student council president.
Eli Ayase (絢瀬 絵里, Ayase Eri)
Voiced by: Yoshino Nanjō (Japanese); Erica Lindbeck (English)
Eli is Otonokizaka Academy's third-year student council president who is determined to save the school. Although she opposes Honoka's plan at first, she ends up becoming the second-to-last girl to join μ's. She is part Russian because of her grandma, and tends to say the Russian word "хорошо" ([xərɐˈʂo]; pronounced harasho, "good"). She is very talented, excelling at academics and athleticion, and is able to perform her duties as the student council president flawlessly. Eli's specialty is quilting. Her experience with ballet ultimately qualifies her as the group's choreographer.
Kotori Minami (南 ことり, Minami Kotori)
Voiced by: Aya Uchida (Japanese); Cristina Vee (English)
Kotori is Honoka's classmate and childhood best friend, as well as the daughter of Otonokizaka Academy's chairwoman, whom she closely resembles. She holds responsibility as the group's wardrobe supervisor. She is very kind, selfless, and considerate and shows a care for everyone, but is also confident and holds opinions of her own, however, she can also be indecisive. For a short time, she secretly worked part-time at a maid cafe. At one point, she intended to move abroad to study fashion, but at the last minute she decided to stay in Japan and remain part of μ's. She later joins the student council and assists Honoka and Umi in taking care of their student council duties.
Umi Sonoda (園田 海未, Sonoda Umi)
Voiced by: Suzuko Mimori (Japanese); Kira Buckland (English)
Umi is Honoka's classmate and childhood friend who is a member of the school's kyūdō club, in which she excels. She believes Honoka is a little bit bright and undisciplined but realizes the perks of having an adventured friend, and usually acts as the voice of reason among the second-year trio. She is the main lyricist of the group. Despite her strict personality, she is also kind. As the daughter of an iemoto mother and a shihan father, Umi has expertise in kendo (long sword), koto (Japanese Zither), nagauta (Shamisen), shodō (Japanese creative writing), and nichibu (Japanese traditional dance). Umi is said to be very scary by Kotori when her sleep is disturbed by others during the training camp with the members of μ's. She later succeeds Nozomi as the student council vice president. Her catchphrase is "Love arrow, shoot!"
Rin Hoshizora (星空 凛, Hoshizora Rin)
Voiced by: Riho Iida (Japanese); Faye Mata (English)
Rin is an athletic first-year student skilled in sports such as hurdling, soccer, and basketball. She is a tomboy, and like Honoka, she has a cheerful and energetic personality, but loses motivation easily. She is best friends with Hanayo, who she tends to look after, and has a habit of ending her sentences with "-nya" (the Japanese equivalent word for "meow"). She has a complex about looking "cute" due to an incident in her childhood in which several boys made fun of her for attempting to dress in more feminine attire, but is eventually able to put the incident behind her with the help of her friends in μ's and begins to express her femininity more.
Maki Nishikino (西木野 真姫, Nishikino Maki)
Voiced by: Pile (Japanese); Caitlin Glass (English)
Maki is a first-year honor student who comes from a wealthy family of doctors. She is a talented young singer and pianist, but is expected to become a doctor and inherit her parents' hospital, which makes her reluctant to join μ's at first. She initially comes across as aloof and a tsundere-like personality, but eventually warms up to the group over the course of the series. Maki is the main composer and vocal coach of the group. She later becomes the vice president of the Idol Research Club after the third-years' graduation.
Nozomi Tojo (東條 希, Tōjō Nozomi)
Voiced by: Aina Kusuda (Japanese); Laura Post (English)
Nozomi is the third-year student council vice-president and the oldest of the group. She acts as the voice of reason to Eli, who was the first friend she made after spending her whole school life transferring from one place to another due to her parents' work, choosing to live by herself in order to stay in Otonokizaka. She also acts as the spiritually leader of the group, and has an almost all-knowing vibe to her, acting when she knew things got too far and even naming the group based on events that were yet to happen. Although she is not from that region, Nozomi speaks in Kansai dialect. Her hobby is fortune-telling, and she uses it to quickly fit in at a new school whenever she is forced to move. Despite having a serene personality, she has a rather mischievous side to her: she can be perverted – being prone to groping the other girls' breasts when she finds them distracted or depressed as a form of "cheering them up".
Hanayo Koizumi (小泉 花陽, Koizumi Hanayo)
Voiced by: Yurika Kubo (Japanese); Xanthe Huynh (English)
Hanayo is a first-year student interested in drawing and origami. She is Rin's close friend. Rin refers to her as "Kayo", an alternate reading of the kanji in her name. She has a fondness for rice and eating in general, and is natural, shy. Prior to joining μ's, she had poor self-esteem and was prone to giving up easily. She has dream about being an idol since she was a baby and her catchphrase is, "Somebody, please help me!" or a variation depending on the media. Nico later chooses Hanayo to succeed as the president of the Idol Research Club after she and the other third-year members graduated.
Nico Yazawa (矢澤 にこ, Yazawa Niko)
Voiced by: Sora Tokui (Japanese); Erica Mendez (English)
Nico is a third-year student interested in fashion, and thus acts as the group's wardrobe supervisor alongside Kotori. She has the strongest desire to become an idol out of everyone in μ's, and has tirelessly worked in order to achieve her goal. However, much to her chagrin, Nico is childlike in appearance and behavior despite her age, looking much younger than the rest of the group. Nico formed the Idol Research Club, but all of her club members left one after another because of her high standards. When Honoka and her friends ask her to have the club as μ's base of operations, she is reluctant at first, doubting how far they are willing to go to become successful idols, until she approves of their effort and eventually joins the group. She is rather tough and constantly craves attention, but deeply cares for the people around her. Unlike the other members of the group, she has an idol persona and tends to invoke her catchphrase, "Nico Nico Nii", with an accompanying pose. Nico is scared of water and can't swim. She is however a very good cook, which comes from having to caring for and look after her three younger siblings (all voiced in Japanese by Sora Tokui): Cocoa Yazawa (矢澤 ココア, Yazawa Kokoa) (Voiced by: Janice Kawaye (English)), Cocoro Yazawa (矢澤 ココロ, Yazawa Kokoro) (Voiced by: Stephanie Sheh (English)) and Cotaro Yazawa (矢澤 虎太郎, Yazawa Kotarō) (Voiced by: Julie Ann Taylor (English)). After she graduates, she passes on the role of club president to Hanayo.

=== A-Rise ===
Tsubasa Kira (綺羅 ツバサ, Kira Tsubasa)
Voiced by: Megu Sakuragawa (Japanese); Cassandra Lee Morris (English)
Tsubasa is the leader of rival group A-Rise and is a student at UTX High School.
Erena Toudou (統堂 英玲奈, Tōdō Erena)
Voiced by: Maho Matsunaga (Japanese); Erika Harlacher (English)
Erena is a member of A-Rise with a more adult-like look than the others and is a student at UTX High School.
Anju Yuuki (優木 あんじゅ, Yūki Anju)
Voiced by: Ayuru Ōhashi (Japanese); Corina Boettger (English)
Anju is a member of A-Rise with a princess demeanor and is a student at UTX High School.

=== Others ===
Yukiho Kōsaka (高坂 雪穂, Kōsaka Yukiho)
Voiced by: Nao Tōyama (Japanese); Christine Marie Cabanos (English)
Yukiho is Honoka's younger sister who often does embarrassing things in private. A 3rd year middle school student at the start of the series, she eventually enters Otonokizaka, heading the Idol Research Club by the end of the series, when all members of μ's have graduated.
Alisa Ayase (絢瀬 亜里沙, Ayase Arisa)
Voiced by: Ayane Sakura (Japanese); Brianna Knickerbocker (English)
Alisa is Eli's younger sister who is a big fan of μ's. Having mostly lived abroad due to her being part-Russian, she is unfamiliar with many Japanese customs. Like her sister, she tends to say the Russian word "хорошо" which means "good". She is very close friends with Yukiho, the two entering Otonokizaka together after middle school. She, alongside Yukiho, is seen heading the Idol Research Club at the end of the series.

== Production ==
Since the first issue of ASCII Media Works' Dengeki G's Magazine was published, the editors of the magazine have hosted reader participation games whose development is directly influenced by the people who read the magazine. The project was first announced in the July 2010 issue of Dengeki G's Magazine, which revealed that the magazine would be collaborating with the anime studio Sunrise and the music label Lantis to co-produce the project. The project officially began with the August 2010 issue of Dengeki G's Magazine, which introduced the story, characters, and a more detailed explanation of the project. The original plan for the story was written by Sakurako Kimino, who also writes the short stories for Love Live! featured in Dengeki G's Magazine. Original character design and illustrations are provided by Yūhei Murota.

Starting in August 2010, online mobile phone popularity contests have periodically been held to rank the characters, which influences the positions of the idols in the anime music videos produced by Sunrise. For example, the idol who ranks first in a given contest will be in the center position in the front row in the music video that follows. Other polls are used to determine different aspects of the idols, such as hairstyles and costumes. Starting with the November 2010 issue of Dengeki G's Magazine, readers were polled to determine the name of the idols' group. After the editors narrowed it down to the five most popular names, readers were polled for a final time, ultimately choosing the name μ's. A similar polling system was used to determine the names of the three subunits: Printemps, BiBi and Lily White.

== Media ==
=== Print media ===
A manga adaptation titled Love Live!, written by Sakurako Kimino and illustrated by Arumi Tokita, began serialization in the January 2012 issue of Dengeki G's Magazine. The manga ended serialization in the magazine's May 2014 issue and was transferred to Dengeki G's Comic starting with the June 2014 issue. The first tankōbon volume was released on September 27, 2012, and five volumes have been released as of May 27, 2017. The second manga titled Love Live! School Idol Diary, written by Kimino and illustrated by Masaru Oda, began serialization in the June 2014 issue of Dengeki G's Comic. The first volume of School Idol Diary was released on September 26, 2014.

A light novel series titled Love Live! School Idol Diary is written by Kimino and contains illustrations by Yūhei Murota, Natsu Otono and Akame Kiyose. ASCII Media Works published 11 volumes between May 30, 2013, and August 29, 2014. A fan book titled History of Love Live! was released on September 10, 2014, which features the Love Live! articles published between the July 2010 and February 2013 issues of Dengeki G's Magazine.

=== Anime ===
A 13-episode anime television series produced by Sunrise, directed by Takahiko Kyōgoku, and written by Jukki Hanada aired in Japan on Tokyo MX from January 6 to March 31, 2013, and was simulcast by Crunchyroll. The opening theme is "Bokura wa Ima no Naka de" (僕らは今のなかで; lit. 'We're Living in the Moment'), while the ending theme is "Kitto Seishun ga Kikoeru" (きっと青春が聞こえる; lit. 'Surely Our Youth Can Be Heard'); both are performed by μ's. An original video animation episode was released on November 27, 2013. A second season aired on Tokyo MX from April 6 to June 29, 2014, also airing on TV Aichi, Yomiuri TV, and BS11, and was simulcast by Crunchyroll. The opening theme is "It's Our Miraculous Time" (Note: Official English title from Love Live! School Idol Festival video game series) (それは僕たちの奇跡, Sore wa Bokutachi no Kiseki; lit. 'That's Our Miracle'), while the ending theme is "Donna Toki mo Zutto" (どんなときもずっと; lit. 'Always No Matter What'); both are performed by μ's. An animated film titled Love Live! The School Idol Movie was released in theaters on June 13, 2015. It was released on Blu-ray in Japan on December 15, 2015.

Both anime seasons and the film were licensed in North America by NIS America, who released the premium edition of the first season on Blu-ray on September 2, 2014 and an English dubbed version was released with the standard edition of the first season, along with the premium edition of the second season, on February 14, 2016, as well as the standard edition of the second season on April 12, 2016. The series also began airing on Mnet America from February 5, 2016. The film was released in North America by NIS America on June 28, 2016, in a premium edition, and July 26, 2016, in a standard edition, both with an English dub. The Blu-ray set for season one has since gone out of print and both seasons were removed from Crunchyroll. MVM Entertainment released the first season in the United Kingdom on July 27, 2015, on DVD, with plans to release it on Blu-ray Disc in 2016 with an English dub. MVM Entertainment also released the second season in 2016. Madman Entertainment released the first season in Australia and New Zealand on June 10, 2015, on DVD.

=== Video games ===
A free-to-play game titled Love Live! School Idol Festival as developed by KLab and released by Bushiroad for iOS devices in Japan on April 15, 2013. The game was a collectible card game with elements of rhythm game and visual novel genres. A version for Android was also released. The game was localized into English and released worldwide on May 11, 2014, for both iOS and Android devices, and also received localizations available in China, Hong Kong, Taiwan, and South Korea. At the end of September 2016, the English version of the game added Korean support due to merging between the two servers. A new game titled Love Live! School Idol Festival All Stars, which also features members of Aqours as well as a new set of characters from Nijigasaki High School Idol Club, was released on September 26, 2019, in Japan. The game released globally on February 25, 2020, with support in Thai, Korean, traditional Chinese, and English.

A series of three rhythm-action video games developed by Dingo Inc., titled Love Live! School Idol Paradise, were released on August 28, 2014, for the PlayStation Vita. The three games were released as Vol. 1 Printemps, Vol.2 BiBi and Vol.3 Lily White. These games sold 88,169 physical retail copies altogether within the first week of release in Japan.

Rin Hoshizora became the new face of the Puyo Puyo games in 2015 as part of a campaign by Sega to market the popularity of the anime by giving her a place on all of their current franchises. A mobile gamed titled Puchiguru Love Live! revolves around the mini-stuffed dolls (known as nesoberi (寝そべり; "lying down")) sold resembling the characters. It was released on April 24, 2018, for Android and iOS, and was shut down on May 31, 2019.

=== Music ===
μ's has 50 singles, seven of which include an anime music video. All of those singles were released between August 2010 and March 2016, with the exception of "A Song for You! You? You!!", a single released in March 2020 in commemoration of Love Live!'s ninth anniversary. The nine idols of μ's are divided into three subunits: Printemps (Honoka, Kotori, and Hanayo), BiBi (Eli, Maki, and Nico), and Lily White (stylized in all lowercase) (Umi, Rin, and Nozomi).

== Reception ==
Anime News Network had two editors review the first season in 2013: Carl Kimlinger reviewed the first six episodes of the series, finding fault in some of the characters lacking depth and the use of 3D animation in the dancing scenes, but praised director Takahiko Kyōgoku for his use of visuals and for giving a realistic approach to idol groups. Rebecca Silverman reviewed the latter half of the series, criticizing the 3D animation and the characters not breaking stereotypes but found it enjoyable because of its charm and offering viewers some characters they will like, concluding with, "When you're feeling down, give this a watch, because if nothing else, Love Live! has its heart in the right place and only seems to want us to smile." Silverman reviewed the second season in 2014, commenting on its tendencies to get melodramatic and lack of equal attention to the main cast, but praised it for fixing the problems she found in the first season and providing genuine emotion from its characters, saying that "it is a lot of fun and one of the most enjoyable entries into the idol genre, a position it solidifies with this second season."

In 2014, Love Live! won the Anime Work Award in the 19th Animation Kobe Awards, an annual anime event in Kobe, Japan. In 2015, μ's won The Best Singing award in the 9th Seiyu Awards. μ's ranked No. 8 among Oricon's best-selling artists of 2015. The group sold over 800,000 music CDs, DVDs, and Blu-ray Discs for over ¥3.15 billion. This is the first time μ's has reached the top 10 in the annual list of best-selling artists. In 2013, μ's was ranked at No. 64, and was ranked at No. 13 in 2014. μ's was ranked No. 10 among Oricon's best-selling artists of 2016, earning about ¥2.54 billion in 2016. μ's is the only female idol group from anime that ranked No. 10 among the top 15 Nikkei Entertainment's Girls Group Ranking in 2016.

Love Live! was ranked No. 1 in top-selling media franchises in Japan for 2016 and ranked No. 4 in 2015. The franchise earned over ¥8 billion in 2016 and over ¥5 billion in 2015. This includes the raw yen totals of Blu-ray Discs, DVDs, music CDs, novels, and manga, but not video games, film tickets, digital downloads, and other forms of media sales. In 2013, physical media sales generated ¥2,516.3 million ($26 million) in Japan. DVD and Blu-ray sales of the anime's second season in 2014 sold ¥2,917.5 million ($24 million) in Japan. The franchise's physical media sales generated ¥23 billion ($182 million) in Japan between 2015 and 2018.

In 2016, μ's received the Special Award in the 30th Japan Gold Disc Awards and their second best album Love Live! μ's Best Album Best Live! collection II was also chosen as Animation Album of the Year. The group even dominated Tower Records Japan's anime CD ranking of 2015.

=== Western popular culture ===
The "Hit or Miss" (2018) Internet meme originates from a TikTok video featuring a cosplay of Nico Yazawa.

== See also ==
- Muses in popular culture
