= The Guided Fate Paradox =

2013 video game

- North American cover art
- Developer: Nippon Ichi Software
- Publishers: JP: Nippon Ichi Software; WW: NIS America
- Designer: Noizi Ito
- Composer: Yōsei Teikoku
- Platform: PlayStation 3
- Release: JP: January 24, 2013; PAL: October 25, 2013; NA: November 5, 2013
- Genres: Roguelike, role-playing
- Mode: Single-player

The Guided Fate Paradox (神様と運命革命のパラドクス, Kamisama to Unmei Kakumei no Paradox; lit. "The God and the Fate Revolution Paradox") is a roguelike role-playing video game developed and published by Nippon Ichi Software for the PlayStation 3. It was released in Japan on January 24, 2013, the PAL region on October 25, 2013, and North America on November 5, 2013. A sequel, The Awakened Fate Ultimatum, was released September 25, 2014 in Japan, March 17, 2015, in North America, and March 20, 2015, in Europe.

== Gameplay ==
The game is a randomly generated dungeon crawler taking place from an isometric perspective, in which the player embarks into themed dungeons, attempting to level up and ultimately beat the boss of the dungeon. Renya is also accompanied by a selectable angel, who provides support by attacking enemies, healing/buffing the player, or throwing them to different places. If the angel dies in battle, they become unavailable until the player is killed or leaves the dungeon.

The player can equip different weapons and armor, which increases in power when it is used in battle, until it "Bursts", reducing its power. Bursting an item allows it to be leveled up at the blacksmith if the player can bring it back to the base. It also gives the player a "holy icon" which the player can use to increase their innate abilities and those of their angels. If the player dies or exits the dungeon, their "total level" increases, giving boosts to the player's innate stats even though they return to level 1.

Later on, the player gains the ability to use "summon sets", sets of equipment that cannot be lost upon death, but can only be summoned for a set number of turns.

== Plot ==
The game takes place in the fictional multiverse established in the Disgaea series. It follows Renya Kagurazaka, a boy who wins the position of God in a mall raffle. He is immediately taken to Celestia, where he meets seven Angels who serve and guide him. Of particular import is the angel Lilliel, his "personal angel" who acts as his de facto partner in battle. He learns that his new job as God requires him to grant the wishes of people who pray to him. He does this using a machine called the "Fate Revolution Circuit", which generates dungeons in a "Copy World" that mirrors the real world. By traveling through these dungeons and fighting monsters called "Aberrations", Renya can influence fate in the real world and affect the lives of the people who make the wishes. Each chapter focuses on a different wisher whose wish Renya must grant.

The wishes start out as unusual and comical, for example, Cinderella expressing her discontent with the happy ending associated with her fairy tale. Ultimately, Renya's task takes a darker turn, as the angels reveal that the use of the Fate Revolution Circuit is merely a training device to allow him to gain power for his true task, stopping the incredibly powerful demon known as Satanael who will destroy Celestia if left unchecked. His title of "God" is not entirely correct, as there were many "Gods" who came before him and were killed by Satanael. Renya also begins to fall in love with Lilliel, with whom he formerly had a more platonic relationship.

Ultimately, Satanael's subordinates, Varael and Frunetti, infiltrate the machine and fight against Renya while he is in the process of granting wishes. However, Renya defeats them. Renya also encounters an even more powerful being known as the Creator, who tells him that he created demons, also known as "black wings", with angels, or "white wings", merely being a mutation of them. Satanael, also known as "Triple Six", was his strongest creation, one that became even stronger than the Creator himself. This breaks Lilliel's resolve, but she is able to continue helping Renya after some soul-searching. Renya makes the Creator promise to seal away his creation abilities if he can defeat Satanael.

Upon gaining sufficient power, Renya travels to the Netherworld with Lilliel, having placed the Fate Revolution Circuit into himself rather than the other way around. While he is fighting, Mysiel, the angel who created the Fate Revolution Circuit and uploaded herself into the machine, erases most of his memories to increase his power levels. Ultimately, Renya is able to fight and defeat Satanael, but the "overclocking" causes him to perish. Lilliel sacrifices her angel powers in order to bring him back to life, although the Creator remarks that he could have easily saved Renya even if Lilliel did not. Renya and Lilliel settle down on Earth to live a normal human life, with both of them having lost all their special powers.

== Development ==
The game was originally revealed in Japan on July 11, 2012, as a 20th anniversary commemorative for Nippon Ichi Software. It was also developed largely by the same team behind the Disgaea series, while Noizi Ito worked as the game's character designer and Yōsei Teikoku composed the music. The game also has Love Live! School Idol Project's idol group μ's as voice actresses for the main female characters in Japanese, and they are credited under their character name.

== Reception ==
Reception

Aggregate score
Aggregator	Score
Metacritic	74/100

Review scores
Publication	Score
Destructoid	8/10
Famitsu	33/40
GameSpot	5/10
Hardcore Gamer	4/5
IGN	7/10
PlayStation Official Magazine – Australia	50%
Push Square	8/10
RPGamer	4.5/5
RPGFan	79%
USgamer	3.5/5

The game received "mixed or average reviews" according to the review aggregation website Metacritic. Bradly Halestorm of Hardcore Gamer said, "The Guided Fate Paradox is a niche game, but that shouldn’t scare off anyone who has a taste for Japanese RPGs. Its story does a balancing act of providing lighthearted fun and philosophical poignancy, while its gameplay is perhaps one of the deepest endeavors on the PS3 right now." In Japan, Famitsu gave it a score of one nine and three eights for a total of 33 out of 40.
