= Love Live! Sunshine!! (TV series) =

- Promotional artwork
- No. of episodes: 26

Release
- Original network: Tokyo MX
- Original release: July 2, 2016 – December 30, 2017

Season chronology
- ← Previous; Love Live! School Idol Project Next → Love Live! Nijigasaki High School; Idol Club

Love Live! Sunshine!! is a 2016 anime television series produced by Sunrise and is the follow-up to the 2013 anime series, Love Live! School Idol Project. Taking place at Uranohoshi Girls' Academy, Chika Takami, a girl who became a fan of the school idol group μ's, decides to follow in their footsteps and form her own school idol group, Aqours. The first season aired in Japan between July 2 and September 24, 2016, and was simulcast by Funimation, Crunchyroll, and Madman Entertainment. An English dub by Funimation began streaming from July 30, 2016. The opening and ending themes are "Aozora Jumping Heart" (青空Jumping Heart, Blue Sky Jumping Heart) and "Yume Kataru yori Yume Utaou" (ユメ語るよりユメ歌おう, Let's Sing About Dreams Instead of Talking About Them) respectively, both performed by Aqours (Anju Inami, Rikako Aida, Nanaka Suwa, Arisa Komiya, Shuka Saito, Aika Kobayashi, Kanako Takatsuki, Aina Suzuki, and Ai Furihata).

A second season aired from October 7 to December 30, 2017, and was also simulcast by Crunchyroll and dubbed by Funimation. The opening and ending themes respectively are "Mirai no Bokura wa Shitteru yo" (未来の僕らは知ってるよ, Our Future Selves Know) and "Yūki wa Doko ni? Kimi no Mune ni!" (勇気はどこに？君の胸に！, Where is Courage? In Your Heart!), both performed by Aqours. "Aozora Jumping Heart" is used as the opening theme for the final episode.

The first Blu-ray disc of the series, containing the first episode of the anime, was released on September 27, 2016. The limited edition contained a balloting ticket for Aqours' first concert, an original song CD, a newly written novel by Sakurako Kimino, a Love Live! School Idol Festival themed UR rarity sticker, a card for Love Live! School Idol Collection, a PR card, and an 8-page booklet. An anime film, Love Live! Sunshine!! The School Idol Movie Over the Rainbow, was released in Japan on January 4, 2019.

== Episode list ==
=== Season 1 ===
Overall	Episode	Title (Note: All English titles are taken from Crunchyroll.)	Insert song(s)	Ending theme singer(s)	Original release date
27	1	"I Want to Shine!!"; Transliteration: "Kagayakitai!!" (Japanese: 輝きたい!!)	"Kimeta Yo - Hand in Hand" (決めたよHand in Hand, It's Decided - Hand in Hand) by Chika Takami (Anju Inami), Riko Sakurauchi (Rikako Aida), and You Watanabe (Shuka Saitō) "Start:Dash!" by μ's	—	July 2, 2016
Having been inspired by the school idol group μ's, Chika Takami, a second-year student at Uranohoshi Girls' Academy, tries to start her own School Idol Club. As Chika and her friend You Watanabe try to recruit members, she faces resistance from the student council president, Dia Kurosawa, who states she will not approve such a club. Later that day, Chika comes across a girl from Tokyo, explaining to her how she became inspired by μ's, who showed her how normal people could shine. Inspired by her story, the girl introduces herself as Riko Sakurauchi, a transfer student from Otonokizaka Academy, the same school μ's attended. After You decides to become the first new member of the School Idol Club, Riko transfers into Chika's class but declines her invitation to her club.
28	2	"Catch the Transfer Student!"; Transliteration: "Tenkōsei o Tsukamaero!" (Japanese: 転校生をつかまえろ!)	"Yume no Tobira" (ユメノトビラ, Door of Dreams) by Riko Sakurauchi (Rikako Aida)	Chika Takami (Anju Inami), Riko Sakurauchi (Rikako Aida), You Watanabe (Shuka Saitō)	July 9, 2016
Chika keeps trying to get Riko to join the School Idol Club, only to get rejected every time, while Dia shows a surprising amount of μ's knowledge. Hearing about Riko's struggles with piano playing, Chika and Yō take her scuba diving, where she learns to hear the sounds of the ocean. The next day, Riko decides to help Chika compose their music, encouraging her to write lyrics based on her love of idols. After listening to one of μ's' songs, Riko decides to take up Chika's offer and join her club.
29	3	"First Step!"; Transliteration: "Fāsuto Suteppu" (Japanese: ファーストステップ)	"Daisuki Dattara Daijōbu!" (ダイスキだったらダイジョウブ!, I Love You, So It'll Be Fine!) by Chika Takami (Anju Inami), Riko Sakurauchi (Rikako Aida), and You Watanabe (Shuka Saitō)	Aqours	July 16, 2016
Mari Ohara, a third year student and newly assigned as the director of Uranohoshi Girls' Academy, states that if the girls can fill up the school gym with audience members, she will approve their School Idol Club. Realising that there aren't enough students in their school to fill the gym, the girls are forced to search outside the school to advertise their concert. While trying to come up with a name for their group, the girls stumble upon the name "Aqours" anonymously written on the beach and decide to use it. On the day of the concert, only a handful of students show up, but the girls perform their hearts out nonetheless. Just as a power outage occurs and all hope seems lost, a whole crowd of people, who heard about the concert through Chika's sister and friends, arrive at the gym, while Dia secretly hooks up a backup generator, allowing the concert to continue.
30	4	"Two Girls' Feelings"; Transliteration: "Futari no Kimochi" (Japanese: ふたりのキモチ)	—	Hanamaru Kunikida (Kanako Takatsuki), Ruby Kurosawa (Ai Furihata)	July 23, 2016
With the School Idol Club approved, Chika and the others begin cleaning up their new clubroom. Meanwhile, Dia's younger sister, Ruby, mentions to her friend Hanamaru Kunikida that Dia used to like school idols, but suddenly came to hate them, leading Ruby to feel that she should not like them either. After Hanamaru starts looking up school idols herself, she encourages Ruby to join the School Idol Club on a trial basis, while keeping it a secret from Dia. As the girls practise running up some stairs, Hanamaru struggles to catch up with everyone, but encourages Ruby to focus on what she wants instead of always worrying about others. Afterwards, Hanamaru convinces Dia to listen to Ruby as she states her true wishes. As Ruby joins the club the next day, she notices Hanamaru's wish is also to become an idol and convinces her to join as well.
31	5	"Yohane Descends"; Transliteration: "Yohane Daten" (Japanese: ヨハネ堕天)	—	Yoshiko Tsushima (Aika Kobayashi)	July 30, 2016
As Aqours try to figure out how to improve their idol ranking, Yoshiko Tsushima, who had been absent from school for a while, is struggling to put her chunibyo habits of pretending she is a "fallen angel" behind her. Watching one of Yoshiko's videos as her persona, "Yohane", Chika decides to invite Yoshiko to join Aqours and have everyone act like fallen angels to increase their appeal. Although this identity gives them a boost in rankings, Dia promptly reminds them that it is only a temporary gain, leading Yoshiko to blame herself. Believing Yoshiko truly loves her persona, Chika once again extends her invitation to join Aqours, encouraging her to love herself for who she is.
32	6	"Let's Make a PV"; Transliteration: "Pī Bui o Tsukurō" (Japanese: PVを作ろう)	"Yume de Yozora o Terashitai" (夢で夜空を照らしたい, I Want to Light Up the Starry Sky With Dreams) by Chika Takami (Anju Inami), Riko Sakurauchi (Rikako Aida), You Watanabe (Shuka Saitō), Yoshiko Tsushima (Aika Kobayashi), Hanamaru Kunikida (Kanako Takatsuki), and Ruby Kurosawa (Ai Furihata)	Kanan Matsuura (Nanaka Suwa), Dia Kurosawa (Arisa Komiya), Mari Ohara (Aina Suzuki)	August 6, 2016
Mari informs Dia about plans to close Uranohoshi and merge with another high school due to lack of applicants. When Ruby tells the others about it, Chika decides to follow μ's' example and try to save their school. She decides to make a promotional video to attract applicants, but struggles to find some actual good things to say about their town. As Chika becomes determined to figure out an answer without relying on Mari, she learns that Dia used to love idols, but is stopped from inquiring further by Ruby. One morning, however, as the town's residents gather to clean up the beach, Riko inspires Chika to get the townspeople's help in filming their promo video.
33	7	"Tokyo"	"Self Control!" by Saint Snow (Sarah Kazuno (Asami Tano) and Leah Kazuno (Hinata Satō))	Yoshiko Tsushima (Aika Kobayashi), Hanamaru Kunikida (Kanako Takatsuki), Ruby Kurosawa (Ai Furihata)	August 13, 2016
With their video placing them in the top 100 school idol groups, Aqours are invited to perform at an event in Tokyo, prompting some concern from Dia. Upon arriving in Tokyo, the girls each check out the specialist shops before coming across the shrine near which μ's used to practice, where they meet another pair of girls attending the event. Later that night, Riko tells Chika about her experiences at Otonokizaka and the expectations she was up against. The next morning, the girls hear about entries opening for the next Love Live before heading over to the event, where the two girls they met before, Sarah and Leah Kazuno, are also competing as the unit Saint Snow.
34	8	"Isn't It Frustrating?"; Transliteration: "Kuyashikunai no?" (Japanese: くやしくないの)	"Self Control!" by Saint Snow (Sarah Kazuno (Asami Tano) and Leah Kazuno (Hinata Satō))	Chika Takami (Anju Inami), Riko Sakurauchi (Rikako Aida), You Watanabe (Shuka Saitō), Yoshiko Tsushima (Aika Kobayashi), Hanamaru Kunikida (Kanako Takatsuki), Ruby Kurosawa (Ai Furihata)	August 20, 2016
The girls are left stunned by Saint Snow's performance, even though they failed to win, and the gap between them and the top school idols hits harder when they discover they ranked in last place with zero votes. After some harsh parting words from Sarah and Leah, who tell them not to treat Love Live like a game, the girls are greeted by Dia upon their return home. Dia explains that two years ago, she once formed a school idol unit alongside Mari and their friend Kanan Matsuura, but when they were invited to perform in Tokyo, the gap in talent left them unable to sing. The next morning, Chika lets out all her pent-up frustrations in front of Riko, with everyone remaining determined to continue being school idols and go beyond zero.
35	9	"Young Dreamer"; Transliteration: "Mijuku Dorīma" (Japanese: 未熟DREAMER)	"Mijuku Dreamer" (未熟DREAMER, Young Dreamer) by Aqours	—	August 27, 2016
As the girls decide to do something for the upcoming summer festival, Chika becomes curious as to why Kanan quit being an idol. While following Kanan on her morning run, the girls overhear an awkward conversation between her and Mari. The next day, as Kanan returns to school, Chika becomes sick of everyone arguing and tries to confront her, Dia, and Mari about what really happened. While Kanan remains defiant, Dia reveals to the others that during the Tokyo event, Kanan chose not to sing on purpose because she didn't want an injury Mari had incurred to get worse by performing, further revealing that she quit being an idol to stop Mari squandering so many possibilities for her future. Hearing about all of this, Mari properly confronts Kanan, and the two finally manage to make up with each other, after which both of them become members of Aqours alongside Dia, who is revealed to be the one who came up with the group's name.
36	10	"We've Got Stewshine"; Transliteration: "Shai-ni Hajimemashita" (Japanese: シャイ煮はじめました)	—	Chika Takami (Anju Inami), Riko Sakurauchi (Rikako Aida)	September 3, 2016
With the arrival of summer vacation, the girls begin training at the beach in preparation for Love Live while also helping out at a run-down snack bar. Meanwhile, Chika overhears that Riko has been invited to a piano recital that takes place on the same day as the Love Live preliminaries. Although Riko tells her that she plans to do Love Live with everyone, Chika remains worried about it. After hearing Riko's piano playing for herself, Chika encourages Riko to follow her own feelings and go to the piano recital.
37	11	"Aye Aye, My Friend"; Transliteration: "Yūjō Yōsorō" (Japanese: 友情ヨーソロー)	"Omoi yo Hitotsu ni Nare" (想いよひとつになれ, Our Feelings Become One) by Chika Takami (Anju Inami), Kanan Matsuura (Nanaka Suwa), Dia Kurosawa (Arisa Komiya), You Watanabe (Shuka Saitō), Yoshiko Tsushima (Aika Kobayashi), Hanamaru Kunikida (Kanako Takatsuki), Mari Ohara (Aina Suzuki), and Ruby Kurosawa (Ai Furihata)	You Watanabe (Shuka Saitō)	September 10, 2016
After Riko heads off for Tokyo for her recital, the others ask You to take her place alongside Chika in their dance routine. As the two practise together, Mari notices that You has been feeling jealous of Chika becoming close with Riko, encouraging her to be honest with Chika. Later, after You receives a call from Riko telling her how much Chika cares for her, Chika comes over, telling You to dance her own way rather than try to imitate Riko. The next day, Riko performs her recital while Aqours perform at the preliminaries, both managing to perform well.
38	12	"It's Time to Fly"; Transliteration: "Habataki no Toki" (Japanese: はばたきのとき)	—	Aqours	September 17, 2016
Aqours qualifies for the Love Live regional qualifiers while Riko wins a trophy in her recital. Despite the popularity of the group, they discover that there are still no applicants for the school. Feeling there is still a large difference between them and μ's, the girls return to Tokyo to meet up with Riko and find out what made μ's so great. There, they meet up with Sarah and Leah, who have also qualified for Love Live and state their determination to win. Afterwards, the girls visit Otonokizaka High School, where one of the students tells them that μ's chose to leave no records of their activities at the school. Thinking about these words, Chika comes to realize that μ's was great not because they aimed to be the best, but because they acted freely, feeling that Aqours should aim to do the same instead of just chasing after them.
39	13	"Sunshine!!"; Transliteration: "Sanshain!!" (Japanese: サンシャイン!!)	"Mirai Ticket" by Aqours	—	September 24, 2016
As the girls keep practicing for the regional qualifiers, some of Chika's friends, having seen everyone's efforts, decide they want to become idols and help the school. Despite almost the entire school showing up to support, Riko reveals that the rules prevent them from joining the group on stage. As Aqours take the stage, they put on a pre-show performance about how they came to be formed and what makes their town so great before performing their song, during which Chika calls down everyone to join in.

=== Season 2 ===
Overall	Episode	Title	Insert song(s)	Ending theme singer(s)	Original release date
40	1	"Next Step"; Transliteration: "Nekusuto Suteppu" (Japanese: ネクストステップ)	—	Chika Takami (Anju Inami), Riko Sakurauchi (Rikako Aida), You Watanabe (Shuka Saitō)	October 7, 2017
Despite not making it to the nationals, the girls become eager to enter the next Love Live! event taking place next spring. As the girls prepare to hold a concert at a school open house, Mari is perturbed by a phone call from her father, something Kanan and Dia are quick to pick up on. Mari eventually reveals to the others that, despite her attempts to overturn her father's decision, the school open house will be cancelled as it has been decided Uranohoshi High will officially stop accepting new students and be closed down. As Chika is initially hit hard by this news, she remains determined not to give up and make a miracle happen, a sentiment that is quickly met by the rest of Aqours.
41	2	"The Sound of Rain"; Transliteration: "Ame no Oto" (Japanese: 雨の音)	—	Aqours	October 14, 2017
Given the task of recruiting a hundred prospective students by the end of the year to save the school, the girls split into groups to write new songs for the next Love Live qualifiers. However, the first and third years struggle to work together due to their differing taste in music genres. Feeling the trouble lies in the girls not knowing each other well enough, Dia tries having them do activities together, but that also leads of a conflict of different tastes. As the girls take shelter from the rain in a Buddhist temple, a leaky ceiling leads to a moment of inspiration, allowing them to bring their differences together and finish their song.
42	3	"Rainbow"; Transliteration: "Niji" (Japanese: 虹)	"My Mai Tonight" (MY舞☆TONIGHT, My Dance Tonight) by Aqours "Kimi no Kokoro wa Kagayaiteru kai?" (君のこころは輝いてるかい?, Is Your Heart Shining?) by Aqours	—	October 21, 2017
Mari gets word that the school open house has been postponed by a week due to road repairs, putting the event on the same day as the Love Live qualifiers. With their only way of attending both events seemingly foiled after a failed attempt at being chosen first to perform at Love Live, the girls are left with the tough decision of either choosing one event over the other or splitting their group between them. Thanks to a moment of inspiration from Chika, however, all the girls manage to perform at the qualifiers before using a monorail used for delivering mandarins to reach the open house on time.
43	4	"Don't Be So Formal with Me"; Transliteration: "Daiya-san to Yobanai de" (Japanese: ダイヤさんと呼ばないで)	—	Dia Kurosawa (Arisa Komiya)	October 28, 2017
After passing the Love Live qualifiers, the girls realize that they are short on cash for their activities and start looking for ways to raise some money. Meanwhile, Dia becomes uneasy with how Kanan and Mari are close with the others and looks for ways to get more personal with them to no avail, even after some counseling with her third year friends. During a part-time job at the local aquarium, some children start making a ruckus until Dia steps in to calm them down. Once Kanan and Mari reveal to the others Dia's intentions, they approach her and reveal that they admire her mature, responsible self, and that she does not need to change for their sake.
44	5	"Taking in a Dog"; Transliteration: "Inu o Hirou" (Japanese: 犬を拾う)	"Crash Mind" by Saint Snow	Riko Sakurauchi (Rikako Aida), Yoshiko Tsushima (Aika Kobayashi)	November 4, 2017
Coming across a stray dog, Yoshiko, whose home doesn't allow pets, asks Riko to look after it. Despite Riko's fear of dogs, both she and Yoshiko grow attached to the dog, but inevitably have to return it to its rightful owner. Unwilling to accept the circumstances, Yoshiko stakes out the owner's house in the hopes of seeing the dog, with Riko deciding to accompany her. After getting to see the dog, Yoshiko accepts that it belongs with its owner while Riko manages to bridge the gap between her and Chika's dog Shiitake.
45	6	"Aqours Wave"	"Miracle Wave" by Aqours	—	November 11, 2017
The girls learn that there are only 57 prospective students so far and the deadline for attaining 100 needed students will coincide with the regional qualifiers, which will be held at the same place from the last time. As Kanan reminisces about the special routine she developed two years ago that led to Mari's injury, Mari and Dia convince her to let Chika try it, as they have only one chance left at Love Live. Chika spends two weeks trying to learn the routine without success, until Kanan convinces her that she must give up on it should she not manage to do it the next morning. She then spends the entire night practicing, later joined by the rest of Aqours, who thank her for gathering them together. As the sun rises, Chika finally manages to perform the routine, which she does perfectly as they perform in the regional qualifiers.
46	7	"The Time Left"; Transliteration: "Nokosareta Jikan" (Japanese: 残された時間)	"Miracle Wave" by Aqours "Sora mo Kokoro mo Hareru Kara" (空も心も晴れるから, Because Our Heart Will Clear Up Just Like The Skies) by Aqours	Aqours	November 18, 2017
Aqours manages to qualify for the Love Live finals, but the school remains short of reaching its target, with Mari's father giving the girls until the next morning before the application page is shut down. Unable to do anything more than they already have, the girls stay overnight at school to watch the numbers until the last minute, only for it to fall just short at 98 applicants. With Uranohoshi's merger now a certainty, the girls, noticing Chika has been hit particularly hard by the result, decide to think over whether they should still perform at the Love Live finals now that they can no longer save the school. The next day, Chika remains in denial, but is encouraged by her classmates to win Love Live and immortalize Uranohoshi as part of its history.
47	8	"Hakodate"	"Drop Out!?" by Saint Snow	Yoshiko Tsushima (Aika Kobayashi), Hanamaru Kunikida (Kanako Takatsuki), Ruby Kurosawa (Ai Furihata)	November 25, 2017
The girls are invited to Hakodate to attend the Hokkaido Love Live regionals, where Saint Snow are competing. However, Saint Snow end up making a mistake in their performance and fail to qualify for the finals. The next day, the girls come across a restaurant where Leah and Sarah work, with Leah stating she no longer wants to be a school idol. Noticing that Leah had been crying, Ruby identifies with her fears they will no longer be able to perform with their respective older sisters. After speaking with Dia, Ruby goes to see Leah and proposes that they both perform a song dedicated to Dia and Sarah as part of a Christmas festival.
48	9	"Awaken the Power"	"Awaken the Power" by Saint Aqours Snow	—	December 2, 2017
Joined by Hanamaru and Yoshiko, Ruby stays behind in Hakodate to prepare for her and Leah's concert while the rest of Aqours return home. After finishing their song, Ruby and Leah approach the festival committee, managing to use the courage they received from their sisters to convince them to let them take part in the festival. Later, Ruby helps Leah to open up to her classmates before they both formally invite Dia and Sarah to the festival, where the rest of Aqours join them in their performance. Afterwards, Leah decides to quit Saint Snow so that she can start up a new school idol group.
49	10	"Finding a Way to Shine"; Transliteration: "Shainī o Sagashite" (Japanese: シャイニーを探して)	—	Kanan Matsuura (Nanaka Suwa), Dia Kurosawa (Arisa Komiya), Mari Ohara (Aina Suzuki)	December 9, 2017
At the start of the new year, Leah and Sarah visit Uranohoshi to help Aqours train for the Love Live finals. Mari is asked by her father to become the director at the newly merged school, but she declines, revealing that she plans to study abroad in Italy following graduation. Later that evening, Dia and Kanan reveal to Mari that they too will be going their own separate ways after graduation. Recalling how the weather would always get in their way of wishing upon a star, Mari takes everyone on a night-time drive to somewhere they can see the stars clearly and make a wish to be together forever.
50	11	"Uranohoshi Girls' High School"; Transliteration: "Uranohoshi Jogakuin" (Japanese: 浦の星女学院)	—	Uranohoshi Girls' High School Students and Others (Aqours, Shima Takami (Kana Asumi), Mito Takami (Kanae Ito), Yoshimi (Risae Matsuda), Itsuki (Hisako Kanemoto), Mutsu (Yu Serizawa), Shiitake (Anna Mugiho), Answerer A (Saki Yamakita), Answerer B (Sayaka Senbongi), Other Schoolgirls (Haruka Miyake, Tomomi Mineuchi, Naoko Komatsu, Miho Okasaki, Tomoko Tsuzuki, Runa Onodera, Shoko Haraguchi, Asumi Yoneyana, Aiko Ninomiya, Momo Higuchi, Kurumi Kimoto, Masae Naruoka, Karin Oda, Mami Uchida, Taeko Morinaga))	December 16, 2017
Following requests from some of the students, Mari agrees to hold a "school closing festival" for Uranohoshi. However, preparations are set back after Shiitake sneaks into the school and causes damage, so everyone stays up late to get things ready for the next day. As the festival gets underway, Chika checks out the various attractions, which includes her classmates arranging a balloon display for everyone. At the end of the festival, Mari almost breaks down in tears of regret, but is cheered up by cheers of support for Aqours.
51	12	"Sea of Light"; Transliteration: "Hikari no Umi" (Japanese: 光の海)	"Water Blue New World" by Aqours	—	December 23, 2017
Arriving in Tokyo for the Love Live finals taking place the next day, the girls once again visit the shrine, finding several prayers in support of Aqours while also running into Leah and Sarah, who asks Chika if they really want to win Love Live. Later that night, Chika asks each of the girls the same question, with each of them expressing their own personal desire to win. The next day, as everyone spends their free time doing their own thing, Chika and You revisit the place where their goal of forming a school idol group began, reaffirming their desire to win. With their resolve and excitement at its peak, Aqours takes the stage at Love Live.
52	13	"Our Own Shine"; Transliteration: "Watashi-tachi no Kagayaki" (Japanese: 私たちの輝き)	"Wonderful Stories" by Aqours	—	December 30, 2017
Having proved themselves victorious at Love Live, the girls begin their final day at Uranohoshi Girls' High School, where everyone paints messages all over the school building before Kanan, Dia, and Mari undergo their graduation. As the day comes to an end, the girls each bid their own farewells to the school as they close its doors for the final time. Come the spring, Chika pays one final visit to Uranohoshi, where all the other girls assemble to sing together one more time.
