= List of Love Live! episodes =

Love Live! is a Japanese multimedia project created by Hajime Yatate and Sakurako Kimino. Each of the individual titles within the franchise revolve around teenage girls who become "school idols". A 13-episode anime television series of Love Live! School Idol Project produced by Sunrise, directed by Takahiko Kyōgoku, and written by Jukki Hanada aired in Japan on Tokyo MX from January 6 to March 31, 2013, and was simulcast by Crunchyroll. An original video animation episode was released on November 27, 2013. A second season aired on Tokyo MX from April 6 to June 29, 2014, also airing on TV Aichi, Yomiuri TV, and BS11, and was simulcast by Crunchyroll.

Both seasons are licensed in North America by NIS America, who released the premium edition of the first season on Blu-ray on September 2, 2014 and an English dubbed version was released with the standard edition of the first season, along with the premium edition of the second season, on February 14, 2016, as well as the standard edition of the second season on April 12, 2016. MVM Entertainment released the first season in the United Kingdom on July 27, 2015, on DVD, with plans to release it on Blu-ray Disc in 2016 with an English dub. MVM Entertainment also released the second season in 2016. Madman Entertainment released the first season in Australia and New Zealand on June 10, 2015, on DVD.

A 13-episode anime television series of Love Live! Sunshine!! produced by Sunrise, directed by Kazuo Sakai, and written by Hanada aired between July 2 and September 24, 2016, and was simulcast by Crunchyroll. A 13-episode second season aired between October 7 and December 30, 2017. The series is licensed in North America by Funimation, in the United Kingdom by Anime Limited, and in Australia by Madman Entertainment. An English dub by Funimation began streaming from July 30, 2016.

A 13-episode anime television series of Love Live! Nijigasaki High School Idol Club produced by Sunrise, directed by Tomoyuki Kawamura, and written by Jin Tanaka, aired between October 3 and December 26, 2020. It was also streamed live through the Bandai Channel, Line Live, and YouTube Live. A second season aired between April 2 and June 25, 2022.

A 12-episode anime television series of Love Live! Superstar!! produced by Sunrise, directed by Kyogoku, and written by Hanada, aired on NHK Educational TV between July 11 and October 17, 2021. Funimation has licensed the series for international releases. A second season aired between July 17 and October 9, 2022. A third season premiered on October 6, 2024.

== Series overview ==
Season	Episodes		Originally released	
Season	Episodes		First released	Last released
Love Live! School Idol Project	26	13	January 6, 2013	March 31, 2013
Love Live! School Idol Project	26	13	April 6, 2014	June 29, 2014
Love Live! Sunshine!!	26	13	July 2, 2016	September 24, 2016
Love Live! Sunshine!!	26	13	October 7, 2017	December 30, 2017
Love Live! Nijigasaki High School Idol Club	26	13	October 3, 2020	December 26, 2020
Love Live! Nijigasaki High School Idol Club	26	13	April 2, 2022	June 25, 2022
Love Live! Superstar!!	36	12	July 11, 2021	October 17, 2021
Love Live! Superstar!!	36	12	July 17, 2022	October 9, 2022
Love Live! Superstar!!	36	12	October 6, 2024	December 22, 2024

== Episode list ==
=== Love Live! School Idol Project (2013–2014) ===
Overall	Episode	Title	Insert song(s)	Ending theme singer(s)	Original release date
1	1	"Come True! Our Dreams"; Transliteration: "Kanae! Watashitachi no Yume" (Japanese: 叶え!私たちの夢――)	"Susume→Tomorrow" (ススメ→トゥモロウ, Susume→Tumorō; lit. 'March Forward to Tomorrow') by Honoka Kōsaka (Emi Nitta), Kotori Minami (Aya Uchida) and Umi Sonoda (Suzuko Mimori) "Private Wars" by A-Rise (Tsubasa Kira (Megu Sakuragawa), Erina Tōdō (Maho Matsunaga) and Anju Yūki (Ayuru Ōhashi))	—	January 6, 2013
2	2	"Let's be Idols!"; Transliteration: "Aidoru o Hajimeyō!" (Japanese: アイドルを始めよう!)	"Start:Dash!!" by Maki Nishikino (Pile) "Private Wars" by A-Rise	Honoka Kōsaka (Emi Nitta), Kotori Minami (Aya Uchida) and Umi Sonoda (Suzuko Mimori)	January 13, 2013
3	3	"First Live"; Transliteration: "Fāsuto Raibu" (Japanese: ファーストライブ)	"Start:Dash!!" by Honoka Kōsaka (Emi Nitta), Kotori Minami (Aya Uchida) and Umi Sonoda (Suzuko Mimori) "Private Wars" by A-Rise	μ's	January 20, 2013
4	4	"MakiRinPana" (Japanese: まきりんぱな)	"Start:Dash!!" by Honoka Kōsaka (Emi Nitta), Kotori Minami (Aya Uchida) and Umi Sonoda (Suzuko Mimori)	Rin Hoshizora (Riho Iida), Maki Nishikino (Pile) and Hanayo Koizumi (Yurika Kubo)	January 27, 2013
5	5	"Nico Attacks"; Transliteration: "Niko Shūrai" (Japanese: にこ襲来)	—	Nico Yazawa (Sora Tokui)	February 3, 2013
6	6	"Who is the Center?"; Transliteration: "Sentā wa Dare da?" (Japanese: センターは誰だ?)	"Korekara no Someday" (これからのSomeday; lit. 'Someday in the Future') by Honoka Kōsaka (Emi Nitta), Kotori Minami (Aya Uchida), Umi Sonoda (Suzuko Mimori), Rin Hoshizora (Riho Iida), Maki Nishikino (Pile), Hanayo Koizumi (Yurika Kubo) and Nico Yazawa (Sora Tokui)	Honoka Kōsaka (Emi Nitta), Kotori Minami (Aya Uchida), Umi Sonoda (Suzuko Mimori), Rin Hoshizora (Riho Iida), Maki Nishikino (Pile), Hanayo Koizumi (Yurika Kubo) and Nico Yazawa (Sora Tokui)	February 10, 2013
7	7	"Elichika"; Transliteration: "Erīchika" (Japanese: エリーチカ)	"Start:Dash!!" by Honoka Kōsaka (Emi Nitta), Kotori Minami (Aya Uchida) and Umi Sonoda (Suzuko Mimori)	Eli Ayase (Yoshino Nanjō) and Nozomi Tojo (Aina Kusuda)	February 17, 2013
8	8	"What I Want to Do"; Transliteration: "Yaritai koto wa" (Japanese: やりたいことは)	"Korekara no Someday" (これからのSomeday; lit. 'Someday in the Future') by Honoka Kōsaka (Emi Nitta), Kotori Minami (Aya Uchida), Umi Sonoda (Suzuko Mimori), Rin Hoshizora (Riho Iida), Maki Nishikino (Pile), Hanayo Koizumi (Yurika Kubo) and Nico Yazawa (Sora Tokui) "Bokura no Live, Kimi to no Life" (僕らのLIVE 君とのLIFE, Our Live, Your Life) by μ's	μ's	February 24, 2013
9	9	"Wonder Zone"; Transliteration: "Wandā Zōn" (Japanese: ワンダーゾーン)	"Wonder Zone" by μ's	Kotori Minami (Aya Uchida)	March 3, 2013
10	10	"No Senpai Allowed!"; Transliteration: "Senpai Kinshi!" (Japanese: 先輩禁止)	—	μ's	March 10, 2013
11	11	"The Greatest Live"; Transliteration: "Saikō no Raibu" (Japanese: 最高のライブ)	"No Brand Girls" by μ's	μ's	March 17, 2013
12	12	"Friends"; Transliteration: "Tomodachi" (Japanese: ともだち)	—	Honoka Kōsaka (Emi Nitta)	March 24, 2013
13	13	"μ's Music Start!"; Transliteration: "Myūzu Myūjikku Sutāto!" (Japanese: μ'sミュージックスタート!)	"Susume→Tomorrow" (ススメ→トゥモロウ, Susume→Tumorō; lit. 'March Forward to Tomorrow') by Honoka Kōsaka (Emi Nitta), Kotori Minami (Aya Uchida) and Umi Sonoda (Suzuko Mimori) "Start:Dash!!" by μ's	μ's	March 31, 2013
OVA	OVA	"—"	"Music S.T.A.R.T!!" by μ's	—	November 27, 2013

Overall	Episode	Title	Insert song(s)	Ending theme singer(s)	Original release date
14	1	"Another Love Live!"; Transliteration: "Mō Ichido Rabu Raibu!" (Japanese: もう一度ラブライブ!)	"Koremade no Love Live! (Musical ver.)" (これまでのラブライブ! 〜ミュージカルver.〜, Koremade no Raburaibu! Myujikaru ver.; Previously on Love Live! (Musical ver.)) by μ's, Hideko (Marie Miyake), Fumiko (Nozomi Yamamoto) and Mika (Sayuri Hara)	—	April 6, 2014
15	2	"Aiming for Victory"; Transliteration: "Yūshō o Mezashite" (Japanese: 優勝をめざして)	—	Eli Ayase (Yoshino Nanjō), Nozomi Tojo (Aina Kusuda) and Nico Yazawa (Sora Tokui)	April 13, 2014
16	3	"Door of Dreams"; Transliteration: "Yume no Tobira" (Japanese: ユメノトビラ)	"Shocking Party" by A-Rise "Yume no Tobira" (ユメノトビラ, Door of Dreams) by μ's	μ's	April 20, 2014
17	4	"No. 1 Idol in the Universe"; Transliteration: "Uchū No. 1 Aidoru" (Japanese: 宇宙No.1アイドル)	—	Nico Yazawa (Sora Tokui)	April 27, 2014
18	5	"A New Me"; Transliteration: "Atarashī Watashi" (Japanese: 新しいわたし)	"Love Wing Bell" by Rin Hoshizora (Riho Iida), Maki Nishikino (Pile), Hanayo Koizumi (Yurika Kubo), Eli Ayase (Yoshino Nanjō), Nozomi Tojo (Aina Kusuda) and Nico Yazawa (Sora Tokui)	Rin Hoshizora (Riho Iida)	May 4, 2014
19	6	"Happy Halloween"; Transliteration: "Happī Harowīn" (Japanese: ハッピーハロウィーン)	"Dancing Stars on Me!" by μ's	Rin Hoshizora (Riho Iida), Maki Nishikino (Pile) and Hanayo Koizumi (Yurika Kubo)	May 11, 2014
20	7	"We Have to do Something!"; Transliteration: "Nantoka Shinakya!" (Japanese: なんとかしなきゃ!)	—	Honoka Kōsaka (Emi Nitta), Kotori Minami (Aya Uchida) and Umi Sonoda (Suzuko Mimori)	May 18, 2014
21	8	"My Wish"; Transliteration: "Watashi no Nozomi" (Japanese: 私の望み)	—	Eli Ayase (Yoshino Nanjō), Maki Nishikino (Pile) and Nozomi Tojo (Aina Kusuda)	May 25, 2014
22	9	"Melody of the Heart"; Transliteration: "Kokoro no Merodi" (Japanese: 心のメロディ)	"Snow Halation" by μ's	—	June 1, 2014
23	10	"μ's"	—	Honoka Kōsaka (Emi Nitta)	June 8, 2014
24	11	"Our Decision"; Transliteration: "Watashi-tachi ga Kimeta Koto" (Japanese: 私たちが決めたこと)	—	μ's	June 15, 2014
25	12	"Last Live"; Transliteration: "Rasuto Raibu" (Japanese: ラストライブ)	"KiRa-KiRa Sensation" by μ's "Bokura wa Ima no Naka de" (僕らは今のなかで, We're Living in the Moment) by μ's	—	June 22, 2014
26	13	"Come True! Everyone's Dreams"; Transliteration: "Kanae! Minna no Yume" (Japanese: 叶え!みんなの夢---)	"Happy Maker" by μ's "Aishiteru Banzai! (Piano Mix)" (愛してるばんざーい!（Piano Mix）, Hooray for I Love You (Piano Mix)) by μ's "Oh, Love & Peace!" by μ's	—	June 29, 2014

=== Love Live! Sunshine!! (2016–2017) ===
Overall	Episode	Title (Note: All English titles are taken from Crunchyroll.)	Insert song(s)	Ending theme singer(s)	Original release date
27	1	"I Want to Shine!!"; Transliteration: "Kagayakitai!!" (Japanese: 輝きたい!!)	"Kimeta Yo - Hand in Hand" (決めたよHand in Hand, It's Decided - Hand in Hand) by Chika Takami (Anju Inami), Riko Sakurauchi (Rikako Aida), and You Watanabe (Shuka Saitō) "Start:Dash!" by μ's	—	July 2, 2016
28	2	"Catch the Transfer Student!"; Transliteration: "Tenkōsei o Tsukamaero!" (Japanese: 転校生をつかまえろ!)	"Yume no Tobira" (ユメノトビラ, Door of Dreams) by Riko Sakurauchi (Rikako Aida)	Chika Takami (Anju Inami), Riko Sakurauchi (Rikako Aida), You Watanabe (Shuka Saitō)	July 9, 2016
29	3	"First Step!"; Transliteration: "Fāsuto Suteppu" (Japanese: ファーストステップ)	"Daisuki Dattara Daijōbu!" (ダイスキだったらダイジョウブ!, I Love You, So It'll Be Fine!) by Chika Takami (Anju Inami), Riko Sakurauchi (Rikako Aida), and You Watanabe (Shuka Saitō)	Aqours	July 16, 2016
30	4	"Two Girls' Feelings"; Transliteration: "Futari no Kimochi" (Japanese: ふたりのキモチ)	—	Hanamaru Kunikida (Kanako Takatsuki), Ruby Kurosawa (Ai Furihata)	July 23, 2016
31	5	"Yohane Descends"; Transliteration: "Yohane Daten" (Japanese: ヨハネ堕天)	—	Yoshiko Tsushima (Aika Kobayashi)	July 30, 2016
32	6	"Let's Make a PV"; Transliteration: "Pī Bui o Tsukurō" (Japanese: PVを作ろう)	"Yume de Yozora o Terashitai" (夢で夜空を照らしたい, I Want to Light Up the Starry Sky With Dreams) by Chika Takami (Anju Inami), Riko Sakurauchi (Rikako Aida), You Watanabe (Shuka Saitō), Yoshiko Tsushima (Aika Kobayashi), Hanamaru Kunikida (Kanako Takatsuki), and Ruby Kurosawa (Ai Furihata)	Kanan Matsuura (Nanaka Suwa), Dia Kurosawa (Arisa Komiya), Mari Ohara (Aina Suzuki)	August 6, 2016
33	7	"Tokyo"	"Self Control!" by Saint Snow (Sarah Kazuno (Asami Tano) and Leah Kazuno (Hinata Satō))	Yoshiko Tsushima (Aika Kobayashi), Hanamaru Kunikida (Kanako Takatsuki), Ruby Kurosawa (Ai Furihata)	August 13, 2016
34	8	"Isn't It Frustrating?"; Transliteration: "Kuyashikunai no?" (Japanese: くやしくないの)	"Self Control!" by Saint Snow (Sarah Kazuno (Asami Tano) and Leah Kazuno (Hinata Satō))	Chika Takami (Anju Inami), Riko Sakurauchi (Rikako Aida), You Watanabe (Shuka Saitō), Yoshiko Tsushima (Aika Kobayashi), Hanamaru Kunikida (Kanako Takatsuki), Ruby Kurosawa (Ai Furihata)	August 20, 2016
35	9	"Young Dreamer"; Transliteration: "Mijuku Dorīma" (Japanese: 未熟DREAMER)	"Mijuku Dreamer" (未熟DREAMER, Young Dreamer) by Aqours	—	August 27, 2016
36	10	"We've Got Stewshine"; Transliteration: "Shai-ni Hajimemashita" (Japanese: シャイ煮はじめました)	—	Chika Takami (Anju Inami), Riko Sakurauchi (Rikako Aida)	September 3, 2016
37	11	"Aye Aye, My Friend"; Transliteration: "Yūjō Yōsorō" (Japanese: 友情ヨーソロー)	"Omoi yo Hitotsu ni Nare" (想いよひとつになれ, Our Feelings Become One) by Chika Takami (Anju Inami), Kanan Matsuura (Nanaka Suwa), Dia Kurosawa (Arisa Komiya), You Watanabe (Shuka Saitō), Yoshiko Tsushima (Aika Kobayashi), Hanamaru Kunikida (Kanako Takatsuki), Mari Ohara (Aina Suzuki), and Ruby Kurosawa (Ai Furihata)	You Watanabe (Shuka Saitō)	September 10, 2016
38	12	"It's Time to Fly"; Transliteration: "Habataki no Toki" (Japanese: はばたきのとき)	—	Aqours	September 17, 2016
39	13	"Sunshine!!"; Transliteration: "Sanshain!!" (Japanese: サンシャイン!!)	"Mirai Ticket" by Aqours	—	September 24, 2016

Overall	Episode	Title	Insert song(s)	Ending theme singer(s)	Original release date
40	1	"Next Step"; Transliteration: "Nekusuto Suteppu" (Japanese: ネクストステップ)	—	Chika Takami (Anju Inami), Riko Sakurauchi (Rikako Aida), You Watanabe (Shuka Saitō)	October 7, 2017
41	2	"The Sound of Rain"; Transliteration: "Ame no Oto" (Japanese: 雨の音)	—	Aqours	October 14, 2017
42	3	"Rainbow"; Transliteration: "Niji" (Japanese: 虹)	"My Mai Tonight" (MY舞☆TONIGHT, My Dance Tonight) by Aqours "Kimi no Kokoro wa Kagayaiteru kai?" (君のこころは輝いてるかい?, Is Your Heart Shining?) by Aqours	—	October 21, 2017
43	4	"Don't Be So Formal with Me"; Transliteration: "Daiya-san to Yobanai de" (Japanese: ダイヤさんと呼ばないで)	—	Dia Kurosawa (Arisa Komiya)	October 28, 2017
44	5	"Taking in a Dog"; Transliteration: "Inu o Hirou" (Japanese: 犬を拾う)	"Crash Mind" by Saint Snow	Riko Sakurauchi (Rikako Aida), Yoshiko Tsushima (Aika Kobayashi)	November 4, 2017
45	6	"Aqours Wave"	"Miracle Wave" by Aqours	—	November 11, 2017
46	7	"The Time Left"; Transliteration: "Nokosareta Jikan" (Japanese: 残された時間)	"Miracle Wave" by Aqours "Sora mo Kokoro mo Hareru Kara" (空も心も晴れるから, Because Our Heart Will Clear Up Just Like The Skies) by Aqours	Aqours	November 18, 2017
47	8	"Hakodate"	"Drop Out!?" by Saint Snow	Yoshiko Tsushima (Aika Kobayashi), Hanamaru Kunikida (Kanako Takatsuki), Ruby Kurosawa (Ai Furihata)	November 25, 2017
48	9	"Awaken the Power"	"Awaken the Power" by Saint Aqours Snow	—	December 2, 2017
49	10	"Finding a Way to Shine"; Transliteration: "Shainī o Sagashite" (Japanese: シャイニーを探して)	—	Kanan Matsuura (Nanaka Suwa), Dia Kurosawa (Arisa Komiya), Mari Ohara (Aina Suzuki)	December 9, 2017
50	11	"Uranohoshi Girls' High School"; Transliteration: "Uranohoshi Jogakuin" (Japanese: 浦の星女学院)	—	Uranohoshi Girls' High School Students and Others (Aqours, Shima Takami (Kana Asumi), Mito Takami (Kanae Ito), Yoshimi (Risae Matsuda), Itsuki (Hisako Kanemoto), Mutsu (Yu Serizawa), Shiitake (Anna Mugiho), Answerer A (Saki Yamakita), Answerer B (Sayaka Senbongi), Other Schoolgirls (Haruka Miyake, Tomomi Mineuchi, Naoko Komatsu, Miho Okasaki, Tomoko Tsuzuki, Runa Onodera, Shoko Haraguchi, Asumi Yoneyana, Aiko Ninomiya, Momo Higuchi, Kurumi Kimoto, Masae Naruoka, Karin Oda, Mami Uchida, Taeko Morinaga))	December 16, 2017
51	12	"Sea of Light"; Transliteration: "Hikari no Umi" (Japanese: 光の海)	"Water Blue New World" by Aqours	—	December 23, 2017
52	13	"Our Own Shine"; Transliteration: "Watashi-tachi no Kagayaki" (Japanese: 私たちの輝き)	"Wonderful Stories" by Aqours	—	December 30, 2017

=== Love Live! Nijigasaki High School Idol Club (2020–2022) ===
Overall	Episode	Title	Insert song(s)	Original release date
53	1	"The First Thrill"; Transliteration: "Hajimari no Tokimeki" (Japanese: はじまりのトキメキ)	"Chase!" by Setsuna Yuki (Tomori Kusunoki) "Dream with You" by Ayumu Uehara (Aguri Ōnishi)	October 3, 2020
54	2	"Cutest♡Girl"; Transliteration: "Cutest♡Gāru" (Japanese: Cutest♡ガール)	"Poppin' Up!" by Kasumi Nakasu (Mayu Sagara)	October 10, 2020
55	3	"Shouting Your Love"; Transliteration: "Daisuki o Sakebu" (Japanese: 大好きを叫ぶ)	"Dive!" by Setsuna Yuki (Tomori Kusunoki)	October 17, 2020
56	4	"The Uncharted Path"; Transliteration: "Michi Naru Michi" (Japanese: 未知なるミチ)	"Saikō Heart" (サイコーハート, Brave Heart) by Ai Miyashita (Natsumi Murakami)	October 24, 2020
57	5	"Something I Can Only Do Right Now"; Transliteration: "Ima Shika Dekinai Koto o" (Japanese: 今しかできないことを)	"La Bella Patria" by Emma Verde (Maria Sashide)	October 31, 2020
58	6	"The Shape of Smiles (⸝⸝>▿<⸝⸝)"; Transliteration: "Egao no Katachi (⸝⸝>▿<⸝⸝)" (Japanese: 笑顔のカタチ（⸝⸝>▿<⸝⸝）)	"Tsunagaru Connect" (ツナガルコネクト) by Rina Tennoji (Chiemi Tanaka)	November 7, 2020
59	7	"Haruka, Kanata, and Beyond"; Transliteration: "Haruka Kanata" (Japanese: ハルカカナタ)	"Butterfly" by Kanata Konoe (Akari Kitō)	November 14, 2020
60	8	"Shizuku, Monochrome"; Transliteration: "Shizuku, Monokurōmu" (Japanese: しずく、モノクローム)	"Solitude Rain" by Shizuku Osaka (Kaori Maeda)	November 21, 2020
61	9	"Friends but Rivals"; Transliteration: "Nakama de Raibaru" (Japanese: 仲間でライバル)	"Vivid World" by Karin Asaka (Miyu Kubota)	November 28, 2020
62	10	"Summer Begins."; Transliteration: "Natsu, Hajimaru." (Japanese: 夏、はじまる。)	—	December 5, 2020
63	11	"Everyone's Dream, My Dream"; Transliteration: "Minna no Yume, Watashi no Yume" (Japanese: みんなの夢、私の夢)	—	December 12, 2020
64	12	"Blossoming Feelings"; Transliteration: "Hanahiraku Omoi" (Japanese: 花ひらく思い)	"Awakening Promise" by Ayumu Uehara (Aguri Onishi)	December 19, 2020
65	13	"The Place Where Everyone's Dreams Come True(School Idol Festival)"; Transliteration: "Minna no Yume o Kanaeru Basho(Sukūru Aidoru Festibaru)" (Japanese: みんなの夢を叶える場所(スクールアイドルフェスティバル))	"Yume ga Koko Kara Hajimaru yo" (夢がここからはじまるよ, Our Dreams Begin Here) by Nijigasaki High School Idol Club	December 26, 2020

Overall	Episode	Title	Insert song(s)	Original release date
78 (Note: The first season of Love Live! Superstar!! aired between the first and second seasons of Love Live! Nijigasaki High School Idol Club.)	14	"A Brand New Thrill"; Transliteration: "Atarashii Tokimeki" (Japanese: 新しいトキメキ)	"Eutopia" by Lanzhu Zhong (Akina Houmoto)	April 2, 2022
79	15	"Overlapping Colors"; Transliteration: "Kasanaru Iro" (Japanese: 重なる色)	—	April 9, 2022
80	16	"Sing! Song! Smile!"	"Enjoy It!" by Qu4rtz	April 16, 2022
81	17	"Ai Love Triangle"; Transliteration: "Ai Rabu Toraianguru" (Japanese: アイ Love Triangle)	"Eternal Light" by DiverDiva	April 23, 2022
82	18	"Dreamland Is Now Open!↑↑(*'▽')"; Transliteration: "Kaimaku! Dorīmurando↑↑(*'▽')" (Japanese: 開幕！ドリームランド↑↑(*'▽'))	—	April 30, 2022
83	19	"Choose Your 'Love'"; Transliteration: "'Daisuki' no Sentaku o" (Japanese: "大好き"の選択を)	"Infinity! Our Wings!!" by A・Zu・Na	May 7, 2022
84	20	"The Memory of Dreams"; Transliteration: "Yume no Kioku" (Japanese: 夢の記憶)	"Emotion" by Shioriko Mifune (Moeka Koizumi)	May 14, 2022
85	21	"The Place Where the Rainbow Begins(Tokimeki Runners)"; Transliteration: "Niji ga Hajimaru Basho(Tokimeki Runners)" (Japanese: 虹が始まる場所(TOKIMEKI Runners))	"Queendom" by Lanzhu Zhong (Akina Houmoto) "Tokimeki Runners (TV Anime Insert Song ver.)" by Nijigasaki High School Idol Club	May 21, 2022
86	22	"The Sky I Can't Reach"	"Stars We Chase" by Mia Taylor (Shu Uchida)	May 28, 2022
87	23	"Kasumin☆Wonder Tour"; Transliteration: "Kasumin☆Wandā Tsuā" (Japanese: かすみん☆ワンダーツアー)	"Love U My Friends (TV Anime Insert Song ver.)" by Nijigasaki High School Idol Club	June 4, 2022
88	24	"The Past, the Future, and Now"; Transliteration: "Kako Mirai Ima" (Japanese: 過去・未来・イマ)	—	June 11, 2022
89	25	"Cheer!"; Transliteration: "Ēru!" (Japanese: エール！)	—	June 18, 2022
90	26	"Let This Thrill Resonate—."; Transliteration: "Hibike! Tokimeki—." (Japanese: 響け！ときめき――。)	"Future Parade" by Nijigasaki High School Idol Club	June 25, 2022
OVA	OVA	"Love Live! Nijigasaki High School Idol Club NEXT SKY"; Transliteration: "Rabu Raibu! Nijigasaki Gakuen Sukūru Aidoru Dōkō-kai NEXT SKY" (Japanese: ラブライブ！虹ヶ咲学園スクールアイドル同好会 NEXT SKY)	"Feel Alive" by R3birth "Go Our Way!" by Nijigasaki High School Idol Club	June 23, 2023

No.	Title	Insert song(s)	Original release date
1	"Part 1"	"Rise Up High!" by Shizuku Osaka "Dream Mermaid" by Kanata Konoe "Cara Tesoro" by Emma Verde "Phoenix" by Lanzhu Zhong "Stellar Stream" by Ayumu Uehara	September 6, 2024
2	"Part 2"	"Itoshiki Yume yo Izanaite" by Shioriko Mifune "Cheer Mode" by A.L.A.N. "Like a Teasure" by Mia Taylor "Stay" by Rina Tennoji "Burn!!" by Setsuna Yuki "Circle of Love" by Ai Miyashita	November 7, 2025

=== Love Live! Superstar!! (2021) ===
Overall	Episode	Title	Insert song(s)	Ending theme singer(s)	Songs of Liella!	Original release date
66	1	"This Yet Unknown Feeling"; Transliteration: "Mada Na mo nai Kimochi" (Japanese: まだ名もないキモチ)	"Mirai Yohō Hallelujah!" (未来予報ハレルヤ!, Future Forecast Hallelujah!) by Liella!	—	"Primary" by Liella!	July 11, 2021
67	2	"No School Idols Allowed?!"; Transliteration: "Sukūru Aidoru Kinshi!?" (Japanese: スクールアイドル禁止!?)	—	Kanon Shibuya (Sayuri Date)	"Memories" by Kanon Shibuya (Sayuri Date)	July 18, 2021
68	3	"KeKa"; Transliteration: "Kūkā" (Japanese: クーカー)	"Tiny Stars" by Kanon Shibuya (Sayuri Date) and Keke Tang (Liyuu)	Kanon Shibuya (Sayuri Date) and Keke Tang (Liyuu)	"Memories" by Chisato Arashi (Nako Misaki)	August 8, 2021 (Note: Due to the 2020 Summer Olympics, the third episode, originally scheduled to air on July 25, 2021, was postponed to August 8.)
69	4	"Street Corner Galaxy☆彡"; Transliteration: "Machikado Gyarakushī" (Japanese: 街角ギャラクシー☆彡)	—	Sumire Heanna (Naomi Payton)	"Anniversary" by Keke Tang (Liyuu)	August 15, 2021
70	5	"Passion Island"; Transliteration: "Passhon Airando" (Japanese: パッションアイランド)	—	Chisato Arashi (Nako Misaki)	"Anniversary" by Ren Hazuki (Nagisa Aoyama)	August 22, 2021
71	6	"I Was Dreaming"; Transliteration: "Yume Mite Ita" (Japanese: 夢見ていた)	"Tokonatsu☆Sunshine" (常夏☆サンシャイン) by Kanon Shibuya (Sayuri Date), Keke Tang (Liyuu), Chisato Arashi (Nako Misaki) and Sumire Heanna (Naomi Payton)	Kanon Shibuya (Sayuri Date), Keke Tang (Liyuu), Chisato Arashi (Nako Misaki) and Sumire Heanna (Naomi Payton)	"Message" by Sumire Heanna (Naomi Payton)	September 5, 2021 (Note: Due to the 2020 Summer Paralympics, the sixth episode, originally scheduled to air on August 29, 2021, was postponed to September 5.)
72	7	"Battle! The Student Council President Elections"; Transliteration: "Kessen! Seito Kaichō-sen" (Japanese: 決戦！生徒会長選)	—	Ren Hazuki (Nagisa Aoyama)	"Message" by Kanon Shibuya (Sayuri Date)	September 12, 2021
73	8	"Connecting Feelings"; Transliteration: "Musubareru Omoi" (Japanese: 結ばれる想い)	"Wish Song" by Liella!	—	"Ringing!" by Chisato Arashi (Nako Misaki)	September 19, 2021
74	9	"What's Your Name?"; Transliteration: "Kimitachi no Na wa?" (Japanese: 君たちの名は？)	"Dreaming Energy" by Liella!	Keke Tang (Liyuu), Chisato Arashi (Nako Misaki), Sumire Heanna (Naomi Payton) and Ren Hazuki (Nagisa Aoyama)	"Ringing!" by Keke Tang (Liyuu)	September 26, 2021
75	10	"Check It Out!!"; Transliteration: "Chekera!!" (Japanese: チェケラッ!!)	"Nonfiction!!" (ノンフィクション!!) by Liella!	Keke Tang (Liyuu) and Sumire Heanna (Naomi Payton)	"Dears" by Ren Hazuki (Nagisa Aoyama)	October 3, 2021
76	11	"Once More, at That Place"; Transliteration: "Mō Ichido, Ano Basho de" (Japanese: もう一度、あの場所で)	"Watashi no Symphony" (私のSymphony, My Symphony) by Kanon Shibuya (Sayuri Date)	Liella!	"Dears" by Sumire Heanna (Naomi Payton)	October 10, 2021
77	12	"Song for All"	"Starlight Prologue" by Liella!	Liella!	"Departure" by Liella!	October 17, 2021

Overall	Episode	Title	Insert song(s)	Ending theme singer(s)	Songs of Liella!	Original release date
91 (Note: The second season of Love Live! Nijigasaki High School Idol Club aired between the first and second seasons of Love Live! Superstar!!.)	13	"Welcome to Liella!!"; Transliteration: "Yōkoso Riera! e!" (Japanese: ようこそLiella!へ！)	"Welcome to Bokura no Sekai" (Welcome to 僕らのセカイ, Welcome to Our World) by Liella!	—	"Dreamer Coaster" by Kanon Shibuya (Sayuri Date)	July 17, 2022
92	14	"Second-years and First-years"; Transliteration: "Ninensei to Ichinensei" (Japanese: 2年生と1年生)	—	Kinako Sakurakoji (Nozomi Suzuhara)	"Dreamer Coaster" by Kinako Sakurakoji (Nozomi Suzuhara)	July 24, 2022
93	15	"Next in Line to Win"; Transliteration: "Yūshō Kōho" (Japanese: 優勝候補)	"Butterfly Wing" by Wien Margarete (Yuina) "Go!! Restart" (Go!! リスタート) by Liella!	Liella!	"Endless Circuit" (エンドレスサーキット) by Keke Tang (Liyuu)	July 31, 2022
94	16	"The Two in the Science Room"; Transliteration: "Kagaku-shitsu no Futari" (Japanese: 科学室のふたり)	—	Mei Yoneme (Akane Yabushima) and Shiki Wakana (Wakana Ōkuma)	"Endless Circuit" (エンドレスサーキット) by Sumire Heanna (Naomi Payton)	August 7, 2022
95	17	"Money Makes the World Go Round"; Transliteration: "Manī wa Tenka no Mawari Mono" (Japanese: マニーは天下の回りもの)	—	Natsumi Onitsuka (Aya Emori)	"Meikyū Sanka" (迷宮讃歌, Maze Hymn) by Ren Hazuki (Nagisa Aoyama)	August 14, 2022
96	18	"Dekkaidow!"	"Vitamin Summer!" (ビタミンSUMMER!) by Liella!	Liella!	"Meikyū Sanka" (迷宮讃歌, Maze Hymn) by Natsumi Onitsuka (Aya Emori)	August 21, 2022
97	19	"UR Ren Hazuki"; Transliteration: "Yū Āru Hazuki Ren" (Japanese: UR 葉月恋)	—	Ren Hazuki (Nagisa Aoyama)	"Prime Adventure" (プライム・アドベンチャー) by Liella!	August 28, 2022
98	20	"Chance Way"	"Chance Day, Chance Way!" by Liella!	Kinako Sakurakoji (Nozomi Suzuhara), Mei Yoneme (Akane Yabushima), Shiki Wakana (Wakana Ōkuma) and Natsumi Ōnitsuka (Aya Emori)	"Parade wa Itsumo (パレードはいつも) by Mei Yoneme (Akane Yabushima)	September 11, 2022 (Note: The eighth episode, originally scheduled to air on September 4, 2022, was postponed to September 11 due to the anime being on a 1-week hiatus.)
99	21	"For Victory"; Transliteration: "Shōri no Tame ni" (Japanese: 勝利のために)	—	Keke Tang (Liyuu) and Sumire Heanna (Naomi Payton)	"Parade wa Itsumo (パレードはいつも) by Shiki Wakana (Wakana Ōkuma)	September 18, 2022
100	22	"A Song That Rings Through Shibuya"; Transliteration: "Shibuya ni Hibiku Uta" (Japanese: 渋谷に響く歌)	"Edelstein" (エーデルシュタイン) by Wien Margarete (Yuina) "Sing! Shine! Smile!" by Liella!	Liella!	"Kakeru Merry-go-round" (駆けるメリーゴーランド) by Chisato Arashi (Nako Misaki)	September 25, 2022
101	23	"Dreams"; Transliteration: "Yume" (Japanese: 夢)	—	Kanon Shibuya (Sayuri Date)	"Kakeru Merry-go-round" (駆けるメリーゴーランド) by Kanon Shibuya (Sayuri Date)	October 2, 2022
102	24	"A Story That Makes My Dreams Come True"; Transliteration: "Watashi o Kanaeru Monogatari" (Japanese: 私を叶える物語)	"Mirai no Oto ga Kikoeru" (未来の音が聴こえる, I Can Hear The Sound Of The Future) by Liella!	Liella!	"Time to Go" by Liella!	October 9, 2022

Overall	Episode	Title	Insert song(s)	Ending theme singer(s)	Songs of Liella!	Original release date
103	25	"The Path I've Chosen"; Transliteration: "Watashi no Kimeta Michi" (Japanese: 私の決めた道)	"Butterfly Wing (Piano Ver.)" by Wien Margarete (Yuina)	Kanon Shibuya (Sayuri Date)	"Dolce" by Wien Margarete (Yuina)	October 6, 2024
104	26	"TomaKanoTe"; Transliteration: "TomaKanōTe" (Japanese: トマカノーテ)	"Bubble Rise" by Kanon Shibuya (Sayuri Date), Wien Margarete (Yuina) and Tomari Onitsuka (Sakura Sakakura)	Kanon Shibuya (Sayuri Date), Wien Margarete (Yuina) and Tomari Onitsuka (Sakura Sakakura)	"Dolce" by Tomari Onitsuka (Sakura Sakakura)	October 13, 2024
105	27	"The White-Colored Center"; Transliteration: "Shiroiro no Center" (Japanese: 白色のセンター)	"Special Color" by Liella!	Mei Yoneme (Akane Yabushima) and Shiki Wakana (Wakana Ōkuma)	Special mini drama "Yuigaoka Joshi! Kyoufu no Nana Fushigi ni Liella! ga Semaru (Zenpen)" (結ヶ丘女子！恐怖の七不思議にLiella!が迫る -前編-)	October 20, 2024
106	28	"No Rain, No Rainbow"	–	Natsumi Onitsuka (Aya Emori)	Special mini drama "Futatsu no Yakiimo" (2つの焼き芋)	October 27, 2024
107	29	"Ni hao! Shanghai! Xiaolongbao~!"; Transliteration: "Nǐ hǎo! Shànghǎi! Xiǎolóngbāo~!" (Chinese: 你好！上海！小籠包〜！)	"Hoshikuzu Cruising (Shanghai Ver.)" (星屑クルージング ～上海 Ver.～) by Keke Tang (Liyuu)	Liella! (~8 Members Ver.~)	Special mini drama "Camp no Omoide" (キャンプの思い出)	November 3, 2024
108	30	"Treasure"; Transliteration: "Takaramono" (Japanese: タカラモノ)	"Zettaiteki Lover" (絶対的LOVER, Absolute Lover) by Liella!	Keke Tang (Liyuu) and Sumire Heanna (Naomi Payton)	Special mini drama "Kanon no Latte Art" (かのんのラテアート)	November 10, 2024
109	31	"In Order to Win Against Liella!"; Transliteration: "Liella! ni Katsu Tameni" (Japanese: Liella!に勝つために)	–	Tomari Onitsuka (Sakura Sakakura)	Special mini drama "Utagoe ga Hibiku Naka de" (歌声が響く中で)	November 17, 2024
110	32	"Yuigaoka VS Yuigaoka"; Transliteration: "Yuigaoka VS Yuigaoka" (Japanese: 結ヶ丘 VS 結ヶ丘)	"Dazzling Game" by Liella!	Chisato Arashi (Nako Misaki)	Special mini drama "Yuigaoka Joshi! Kyoufu no Nana Fushigi ni Liella! ga Semaru (Kouhen)" (結ヶ丘女子！恐怖の七不思議にLiella!が迫る -後編-)	November 24, 2024
111	33	"Salzburger Nockerln"; Transliteration: "Salzburger Nockerln" (Japanese: ザルツブルガー・ノッケルン)	"Let's Be One" by Liella!	Wien Margarete (Yuina)	"Summer Escape!!" by Kinako Sakurakoji (Nozomi Suzuhara), Mei Yoneme (Akane Yabushima), Shiki Wakana (Wakana Ōkuma) and Natsumi Onitsuka (Aya Emori)	December 1, 2024
112	34	"Kinako Sakurakoji"; Transliteration: "Sakurakōji Kinako" (Japanese: 桜小路 きな子)	"Egao no Promise" (笑顔のPromise) by Liella!	Ren Hazuki (Nagisa Aoyama) and Kinako Sakurakoji (Nozomi Suzuhara)	"11th Moon" by Wien Margarete (Yuina) and Tomari Onitsuka (Sakura Sakakura)	December 8, 2024
113	35	"Superstar!!"; Transliteration: "Superstar!!" (Japanese: スーパースター!!)	"Superstar!!" (スーパースター!!, Superstar!!) by Liella!	Liella!	"Hitohira Dake" (ひとひらだけ) by Kanon Shibuya (Sayuri Date), Keke Tang (Liyuu), Chisato Arashi (Nako Misaki), Sumire Heanna (Naomi Payton) and Ren Hazuki (Nagisa Aoyama)	December 15, 2024
114	36	"Forever and Ever!"; Transliteration: "Zutto Zutto!" (Japanese: ずっとずっと！)	"Hajimari wa Kimi no Sora (11 Ver.)" (始まりは君の空 ～11 Ver.～) by Liella!	–	"Musubu Melody" (結ぶメロディ) by Liella!	December 22, 2024
