= 11th Seiyu Awards =

Japanese voice acting awards ceremony in 2017

- Awarded for: Voice acting in Japan
- Date: March 18, 2017
- Location: JOQR Media Plus Hall; Minato, Tokyo
- Country: Japan

Highlights
- Best Lead Actor: Ryunosuke Kamiki
- Best Lead Actress: Mone Kamishiraishi
- Website: www.seiyuawards.jp

The 11th Seiyu Awards was held on March 18, 2017, at the JOQR Media Plus Hall in Minato, Tokyo. The winners of the Merit Awards, the Kei Tomiyama Award and the Kazue Takahashi Award were announced on February 21, 2017. The winners of the Synergy Award and Kids/Family award was announced on March 14, 2017. The rest of the winners were announced on the ceremony day.

Winners	Agency	Highlight Works
Best Actor in a Leading Role
Ryunosuke Kamiki	Amuse, Inc.	Taki Tachibana (Anime film Your Name)
Best Actress in a Leading Role
Mone Kamishiraishi	TOHO Entertainment	Mitsuha Miyamizu (Anime film Your Name)
Best Actors in Supporting Roles
Hōchū Ōtsuka	Crazy Box	Satō (Anime TV series Ajin: Demi-Human)
Best Actresses in Supporting Roles
Megumi Han	Atomic Monkey	Sumi (Anime film In This Corner of the World)
Best Rookie Actors
Setsuo Itō	Air Agency	Shigeo "Mob" Kageyama (Anime TV series Mob Psycho 100)
Yūma Uchida	I'm Enterprise	Hayate Immelmann (Anime TV series Macross Delta)
Yūsuke Kobayashi	Yu-rin Pro	Arslan (Anime TV series The Heroic Legend of Arslan: Dust Storm Dance)
Best Rookie Actresses
Ari Ozawa	I'm Enterprise	Mizuki Usami (Anime TV series This Art Club Has a Problem!)
Sayaka Senbongi	I'm Enterprise	Mumei (Anime TV series Kabaneri of the Iron Fortress)
Minami Tanaka	81 Produce	Katia Waldheim (Anime TV series Schwarzesmarken)
Singing Award
Winner	Members	Agency
Aqours	Anju Inami; Rikako Aida; Nanaka Suwa; Arisa Komiya; Shuka Saitō; Aika Kobayashi; Kanako Takatsuki; Aina Suzuki; Ai Furihata	Lantis
Personality Award
Winner	Agency	Highlight Works
Natsuki Hanae	Across Entertainment	TV show Oha Suta
Natsuki Hanae	Across Entertainment	Radio Show A&G Tribal Radio Agson

Merit Award
Winners	Agency
Kiyoshi Kobayashi	Haikyō
Mari Shimizu	81 Produce
Junko Hori	Production Baobab
Synergy Award
Winner
Your Name
Kei Tomiyama Memorial Award
Winner	Agency
Ryusei Nakao	81 Produce
Kazue Takahashi Memorial Award
Winner	Agency
Sumi Shimamoto	freelance
Kids/Family Award
Winner
All The Secret Life of Pets cast
Special Award
Winner	Agency
Non	LesPros entertainment
