= Yohane the Parhelion: Sunshine in the Mirror =

Japanese multimedia project

- Promotional artwork, depicting the ten main characters

幻日のヨハネ Sunshine in the Mirror (Genjitsu no Yohane: Sunshine in the Mirror)
- Genre: Fantasy
- Created by: Hajime Yatate (story); Sakurako Kimino (concept)
- Manga

Genjitsu no Yohane: Unpolarized Reflexion
- Written by: Kōta Matsuda
- Published by: ASCII Media Works
- Magazine: Love Live! Days
- Original run: January 31, 2022 – March 29, 2024
- Volumes: 3
- Anime television series
- Directed by: Asami Nakatani
- Written by: Toshiya Ono
- Music by: Tatsuya Kato
- Studio: Sunrise
- Licensed by: Crunchyroll; UK: Anime Limited; SA/SEA: Medialink
- Original network: Tokyo MX, BS11, SUN, KBS, TVA, SBS
- Original run: July 2, 2023 – September 24, 2023
- Episodes: 13
- icon

Yohane the Parhelion: Sunshine in the Mirror (Japanese: 幻日のヨハネ Sunshine in the Mirror, Hepburn: Genjitsu no Yohane: Sunshine in the Mirror) is a Japanese multimedia spin-off project from the Love Live! fantasy musical anime series. It is a fantasy re-imagining of Love Live! Sunshine!!, and follows Yohane, a failed idol turned fortune teller in the quiet city of Numazu, and her exploits with the other members of the community and her talking wolf, Lailaps.

Yohane the Parhelion originated as a series of fantasy illustrations included in the monthly Love Live! Days magazine starting in October 2020. In February 2022, these were adapted into Genjitsu no Yohane Unpolarized Reflexion, a manga published in Love Live! Days. On April Fools' Day 2022, the Yohane the Parhelion anime series was teased, ostensibly as an April Fools' joke, before eventually being confirmed as a real production and airing for 13 episodes from July to September 2023 on Tokyo MX and other channels. The anime was produced by Sunrise, directed by Asami Nakatani, and written by Toshiya Ono, with Yumiko Yamamoto designing the characters and Tatsuya Kato composing the music. In 2023, two video games were released based on the series: Yohane the Parhelion: Blaze in the Deepblue, a Metroidvania action-adventure game; and Yohane the Parhelion: Numazu in the Mirage, a roguelike deck-building game.

== Premise ==
Yohane the Parhelion is a re-imagining of Love Live! Sunshine!!, featuring characters and settings based on their counterparts in Sunshine!!. The exact period the series is set in is vague, with the depicted technology and styling alternating between the 20th and 21st centuries. Magic exists, but its prominence varies throughout the project; in Unpolarized Reflexion and the video games, it is a significant factor, while in the anime, its role is fairly limited. Malevolent entities such as miasma, resonance, or Loveca Gems (loosely based on the premium currency from Love Live! School Idol Festival) are recurring plot elements, typically depicted as affecting sentient beings such as wildlife and making them aggressive.

The project follows Yohane (based on Yoshiko Tsushima in Sunshine!!) who, after failing at becoming an idol in Tokai, is reluctantly called back to her hometown of Numazu, where she becomes a fortune teller (more of a handyman in practice) and lives alongside her pet and familiar, a talking wolf named Lailaps. Though she views her situation with disdain, unbeknownst to her, she wields magical powers associated with her singing that usually manage to resolve her problems and help the wider community. Throughout her life in Numazu, Yohane interacts with her friends (based on the other members of Aqours, which does not exist in this universe).

== Characters ==
Yohane (ヨハネ)
Voiced by: Aika Kobayashi
Based on: Yoshiko Tsushima (津島 善子, Tsushima Yoshiko)
A young girl and wannabe idol who returns to her hometown of Numazu from Tokai to settle down and start a fortune-telling business, though she is established to be unskilled at this and finds herself serving as a helping hand more often. She initially hates her situation and dislikes Numazu, but eventually learns to become content with life there. Unbeknownst to her, her singing is magical.
Lailaps (ライラプス, Rairapusu)
Voiced by: Yoko Hikasa
A large talking wolf that lives with Yohane and has a friendly sisterly relationship with her. Lailaps is implied to be Yohane's familiar, and it is suggested that only Yohane can understand her when she speaks.
Hanamaru (ハナマル)
Voiced by: Kanako Takatsuki
Based on: Hanamaru Kunikida (国木田 花丸, Kunikida Hanamaru)
A baker who lives in town. She is also Yohane's childhood friend and knows her very well. She is often accompanied by a large boar-like animal named Shishinoshin (シシノシン).
Dia (ダイヤ, Daiya)
Voiced by: Arisa Komiya
Based on: Dia Kurosawa (黒澤 ダイヤ, Kurosawa Daiya)
The executive director of the town's administrative bureau, and a talented perfectionist. Dia is a fairy like her sister Ruby; however, she is capable of controlling her size, allowing her to maintain the appearance of an adult human. She moonlights as Scarlet Delta, a masked and armored superhero riding a magical motorcycle, inspired by heroes in tokusatsu works that her actress Arisa Komiya also has roles in such as Tokumei Sentai Go-Busters and Kamen Rider.
Ruby (ルビィ, Rubii)
Voiced by: Ai Furihata
Based on: Ruby Kurosawa (黒澤 ルビィ, Kurosawa Rubii)
Dia's younger sister and assistant. She is relatively shy and self-conscious of her unusual appearance. Ruby is a fairy like her sister Dia, though unlike her, Ruby is not yet skilled at controlling her size, and is thus often seen in her smaller fairy form. When Dia is Scarlet Delta, Ruby is capable of possessing her motorcycle, boosting it and allowing her to control it independently.
Chika (チカ)
Voiced by: Anju Inami
Based on: Chika Takami (高海 千歌, Takami Chika)
The youngest of three daughters, whose family runs the Tochiman Ryokan Inn, a ryokan in the Uchira district. She has a pet dog named Shiitake (シイタケ), who is the Tochiman Ryokan Inn's mascot. Chika and her family moonlight as Million Dollar, a group of masked vigilantes armed with wind cannons tasked with protecting Numazu; in Million Dollar, her secret identity is "Katy".
You (ヨウ, Yō)
Voiced by: Shuka Saitō
Based on: You Watanabe (渡辺 曜, Watanabe Yō)
An energetic girl who works as an aerial messenger in Numazu. She works for a postal service that operates by firing messengers out of large cannons, using gliding flight to maneuver to their delivery points and custom retrorocket boots to land safely. In Unpolarized Reflexion, You adopts a hat-like bird named Piyosuke (ぴよ助) after accidentally colliding with it in flight.
Kanan (カナン)
Voiced by: Nanaka Suwa
Based on: Kanan Matsuura (松浦 果南, Matsuura Kanan)
A mechanic at a coastal repair shop in the Uchira district. She makes a living making items and repairing derelict structures throughout Numazu, using scrap materials salvaged from Suruga Bay. She built a companion and assistant, Tonosama, out of scrap metal.
Riko (リコ)
Voiced by: Rikako Aida
Based on: Riko Sakurauchi (桜内 梨子, Sakurauchi Riko)
A zoologist who came to Numazu to work with unusual animals. Though -Unpolarized Reflexion- depicts Riko as an animal caretaker, the anime depicts her as a researcher instead. As the nature of her work demands that she move frequently, she is closer to animals than humans and tries to avoid making friends. She is generally inquisitive and calm, but becomes obsessively hyperactive when seeing a species she is unfamiliar with, such as Lailaps or Ruby.
Mari (マリ)
Voiced by: Aina Suzuki
Based on: Mari Ohara (小原 鞠莉, Ohara Mari)
A woman of an unspecified age who lives in isolation in her castle on Wassimer Island. Mari distinctively has a pair of large ram-like horns on her head and ultrasonic hearing, said to be the result of a genetic condition unique to her family. Her appearance and struggles with her abilities led to her being judged and ostracized by locals, who refer to her as the "Demon Lord", giving her a distant personality and considerable social anxiety; despite this, she still uses her abilities to help the town from a distance. She lives with numerous familiars loosely based on sea creatures and is assisted by Pellapie (ペラピー, Perapī), a rotorcraft-like familiar that follows her.

=== Supporting ===
Yohane's mother (ヨハネの母, Yohane no Haha)
Voiced by: Hekiru Shiina
Yohane's mother. She is a scholar who often travels for business. In the anime, she calls Yohane back to Numazu after a deal between them (Yohane succeeding in becoming an idol in Tokai) fails to materialize, and tasks her with finding friends over the summer while she is away for work.
Chika's mother (チカの母, Chika no Haha)
Voiced by: Rie Kugimiya
Chika's mother. She runs the Tochiman Ryokan Inn. In Million Dollar, she serves as mission control, and her secret identity is "Big Mom".
Shima (シマ)
Voiced by: Kana Asumi
Chika's oldest sister. Like the rest of her family, she works at the Tochiman Ryokan Inn. In Million Dollar, her secret identity is "Marcy".
Mito (ミト)
Voiced by: Kanae Itō
Chika's older sister, and the middle child of her family. Like the rest of her family, she works at the Tochiman Ryokan Inn. In Million Dollar, her secret identity is "Tommy".
Tsuki (ツキ)
Voiced by: Tomoyo Kurosawa
You's cousin. She is a photographer who runs a photographic studio in Numazu. She has two twin sisters named Miki (ミキ) and Nami (ナミ). The character she is based on originally appears in Love Live! Sunshine!! The School Idol Movie: Over the Rainbow.
Kohaku (コハク)
Voiced by: M.A.O
Dia's administrative assistant, and an unspecified but close relative to Dia and Ruby who has known them since childhood. It is unclear if she is also a fairy.
Tonosama (トノサマ)
Voiced by: Nobuo Tobita
Kanan's robotic companion and assistant, resembling a large bipedal frog, with a personality influenced by exaggerated kabuki theatrics. He is one of the only male characters in the entire Love Live! multimedia project with a significant speaking role.

== Production and release ==
In October 2020, the Genjitsu no Yohane: Sunshine in the Mirror fantasy illustration series, drawn by Taira Akitsu, first appeared in the Love Live! Days magazine. It inspired the Genjitsu no Yohane: Unpolarized Reflexion manga series, launched by Kōta Matsuda in the same magazine in February 2022, both of which featured Yoshiko as the main character. The Love Live! franchise posted an April Fools' Day video in 2022 hinting at the series, though it was not officially announced until June 26, 2022. The series has Asami Nakatani as the director and Toshiya Ono as show writer. It features music by Tatsuya Kato, who composed the music for Love Live! Sunshine!!, and Yumiko Yamamoto as the character designer. Aqours sings the opening and ending songs, "Genjitsu Mysterium" (幻日ミステリウム) and "Kimi no Tame Boku no Tame" (キミノタメボクノタメ).

The series was picked up by Crunchyroll, an American streaming service, where the first episode premiered on June 25, and by Abema, a Japanese streaming service, the same day. It premiered on Crunchyroll India on June 26. The series later premiered on July 2 on Tokyo MX, Nippon BS Broadcasting, Sun Television, KBS Kyoto, and TV Aichi, and on Shizuoka Broadcasting System on July 3.

In June 2023, it was announced that a short video would be posted on YouTube to commemorate the anime, and the Yohane no Uranai Koheya ('Yohane's Fortune-Telling Booth') internet radio program would be launched, which would accept submissions from fans. The same month, Inti Creates revealed that a game entitled Yohane the Parhelion: Blaze in the Deepblue based on the anime would be launched on various platforms on November 16. On June 21, a crossover chibi short premiered using characters from the Genjitsu no Yohane: Sunshine in the Mirror illustrated series and That Time I Got Reincarnated as a Slime.

A compilation film of the series was announced on June 30, 2024. The film premiered in Japanese theaters on November 29, 2024.

=== Episodes ===
No.	Title (Note: All English titles are taken from Crunchyroll.)	Directed by (Note: Information is taken from the ending credits of each episode.)	Written by	Storyboarded by	Insert song(s)	Original release date
1	"The Song of Beginnings"; Transliteration: "Hajimari no Uta" (Japanese: はじまりのうた)	Takashi Sakuma	Toshiya Ono	Asami Nakatani	"Far Far Away" by Yohane (Aika Kobayashi)	July 2, 2023
Yohane travels to her hometown after her attempts to become an idol are not successful. She meets a wolf named Lailaps, who becomes her guide, her friend Hanamaru, and begins to realize that she wants to be in the town after all.
2	"My Job"; Transliteration: "Watashi no Oshigoto" (Japanese: わたしのおしごと)	Katsuya Asano	Toshiya Ono	Katsuya Asano	—	July 9, 2023
Yohane tries to begin her new job as a fortune teller in town, but it doesn't go as well as she expected. She ends up helping people in the local town, connects more with Hanamaru, and ends up in the dark forest, where she is threatened by monsters.
3	"Solidarity: Are you ready?" Transliteration: "Danketsu Are you ready?" (Japanese: 団結Are you ready?)	Keisuke Watanabe, Chikara Sakurai (Note: Music Part Director (楽曲パート演出))	Toshiya Ono	Chikara Sakurai	"Be as One!!!" by Dia (Arisa Komiya), Ruby (Ai Furihata), and Chika (Anju Inami)	July 16, 2023
Yohane is saved by the Million Dollar group, but then finds herself in a dangerous situation when the forest animals, possessed by an unknown force, come closer. She is saved by Dia and Ruby. Yohane, Ruby, Dia, and the Million Dollar group work together to free the animals from the curse. Later, Yohane visits Mari, the so-called "demon lord" on Wassimer Island, to learn more about how to use her magical powers.
4	"Between the Sky and Sea"; Transliteration: "Sora to Umi no Aida" (Japanese: 空と海のあいだ)	Nana Harada, Motoki Nakanishi	Toshiya Ono	Hiroaki Shimura, Kentarō Suzuki (Note: Music Part Storyboard (楽曲パート絵コンテ))	"R・E・P" by Hanamaru (Kanako Takatsuki), You (Shuka Saitō), and Kanan (Nanaka Suwa)	July 23, 2023
Still worried about Mari's words, Yohane is drafted by the courier You to help with her job and meets the engineer Kanan, who also enlists her help.
5	"The Demon Lord's Secret"; Transliteration: "Maō no Himitsu" (Japanese: まおうのひみつ)	Tatsunari Koyano	Toshiya Ono	Ryūhei Aoyagi	—	July 30, 2023
Yohane decides to help Mari, who lived her entire life isolated from others, to interact with the locals and the two grow closer.
6	"The Harmony of the Shy"; Transliteration: "Hitomishiri no Hāmonī" (Japanese: ひとみしりのハーモニー)	Akira Yamada, Asami Nakatani	Toshiya Ono	Katsuya Asano, Asami Nakatani, Yūsuke Maruyama, Tomomi Umetsu	"Hey, Dear My Friends" by Yohane (Aika Kobayashi), Riko (Rikako Aida), and Mari (Aina Suzuki)	August 6, 2023
With the calamity that threatens Numazu growing closer, Yohane and Mari meet the researcher Riko, who tells them that she will soon leave the city, but the two discover however, that Riko is leaving the city out of fear of separating from them in the future and the three bond together by helping her to deal with it.
7	"What's a Girls' Night?"; Transliteration: "Joshikai tte Nāni?" (Japanese: 女子会ってなあに？)	Masakazu Sunagawa	Toshiya Ono	Midori Yoshizawa	"Girls!!" by Yohane (Aika Kobayashi)	August 13, 2023
Yohane and her friends decide to hold a meeting together. Yohane works hard into planning to make the event a success but on during the meeting, she collapses from exhaustion and anxiety. After recovering, the girls enjoy themselves together and Yohane decides what she wants to do.
8	"Reach them! Sea breeze" Transliteration: "Todoke! Sea breeze" (Japanese: 届け！Sea breeze)	Yūya Horiuchi, Kōtarō Matsunaga (Note: Dance Part Director (ダンスパート演出))	Toshiya Ono	Chikara Sakurai, Gō Kurosaki (Note: Dance Part Storyboard (ダンスパート絵コンテ))	"Wonder Sea Breeze" by Yohane (Aika Kobayashi), Hanamaru (Kanako Takatsuki), Dia (Arisa Komiya), Ruby (Ai Furihata), Chika (Anju Inami), You (Shuka Saitō), Kanan (Nanaka Suwa), Riko (Rikako Aida), and Mari (Aina Suzuki)	August 20, 2023
The summer festival begins and Yohane is eager for her performance with their friends, until she loses her staff and the other girls begin to look for it around the place for her.
9	"Find Lailaps"; Transliteration: "Rairapusu o Sagase" (Japanese: ライラプスをさがせ)	Yūsuke Shibata	Toshiya Ono	Kentarō Suzuki	—	August 27, 2023
Lailaps takes a stroll around the town and Yohane decides to follow her to learn more about her routine, but when she suddenly disappears, the whole town ends up looking for her, until Yohane finds her in the very place where they first met years ago.
10	"See You Soon, Yohane-chan!"; Transliteration: "Itterasshai Yohane-chan!" (Japanese: いってらっしゃいヨハネちゃん！)	Shinya Iino	Kakuzō Nanmanji	Shinya Iino	—	September 3, 2023
A manager from the capital invites Yohane for an audition. The town decides to make a special event for Yohane to send her off but she gets distressed when she has an argument with Lailaps who does not appear at the event, until Lailaps notices the calamity approaching the city and runs to help her.
11	"Yohane's Magic"; Transliteration: "Yohane no Mahō" (Japanese: ヨハネのまほう)	Motoki Nakanishi	Kakuzō Nanmanji	Motoki Nakanishi	—	September 10, 2023
12	"Farewell, Lailaps"; Transliteration: "Sayonara Rairapusu" (Japanese: さよならライラプス)	Chikara Sakurai, Kōtarō Matsunaga	Toshiya Ono	Chikara Sakurai, Asami Nakatani	"Forever U & I" by Yohane (Aika Kobayashi)	September 17, 2023
13	"Once Again Today"; Transliteration: "Soshite Kyō mo" (Japanese: そして今日も)	Asami Nakatani, Katsuya Asano, Masakazu Hishida	Toshiya Ono	Asami Nakatani, Katsuya Asano, Masakazu Hishida	"La La Yuuki no Uta" (La la 勇気のうた, La La Song of Courage) by Yohane (Aika Kobayashi), Hanamaru (Kanako Takatsuki), Dia (Arisa Komiya), Ruby (Ai Furihata), Chika (Anju Inami), You (Shuka Saitō), Kanan (Nanaka Suwa), Riko (Rikako Aida), and Mari (Aina Suzuki)	September 24, 2023

== Reception ==
In Anime News Network's "Summer 2023 Preview Guide", regarding the first episode of the series, Nicholas Dupree said it was "accessible to newcomers" but was critical of it for "standard ... plotbeats" and called it more of a "musical than a fairy tale adventure", and praised the series for translating Yohane's chūnibyō gimmick "into an actual fantasy world". In the same post, Rebecca Silverman was more critical, saying the episode disappointed her and that she did not sympathize with Yohane, while James Beckett described the premiere as "boring" but understood the appeal for others, and Richard Eisenbeis said it was "nothing to write home about". Also in the post, Caitlin Moore argued that the episode was like reading an alternate universe fan fiction for a series she "knew nothing about", and called it a "fans-only affair" which would appeal to those who like idol anime. Kevin Credo of Game Rant described the series as an "imaginative and isekai-tinged spinoff anime".
