= Management of a Novice Alchemist =

Japanese light novel series and its franchise

- First light novel volume cover

新米錬金術師の店舗経営 (Shinmai Renkinjutsushi no Tenpo Keiei)
- Novel series
- Written by: Mizuho Itsuki
- Published by: Shōsetsuka ni Narō
- Original run: November 1, 2018 – present
- Light novel
- Written by: Mizuho Itsuki
- Illustrated by: Fuumi
- Published by: Fujimi Shobo
- English publisher: NA: J-Novel Club
- Imprint: Fujimi Fantasia Bunko
- Original run: September 20, 2019 – present
- Volumes: 7
- Manga
- Written by: Mizuho Itsuki
- Illustrated by: kirero
- Published by: Kill Time Communication
- Magazine: Comic Valkyrie
- Original run: December 11, 2020 – present
- Volumes: 9
- Anime television series
- Directed by: Hiroshi Ikehata
- Written by: Shigeru Murakoshi
- Music by: Harumi Fuuki
- Studio: ENGI
- Licensed by: Sentai Filmworks
- Original network: AT-X, Tokyo MX, KBS Kyoto, SUN, BS NTV
- Original run: October 3, 2022 – December 19, 2022
- Episodes: 12
- icon

Management of a Novice Alchemist (Japanese: 新米錬金術師の店舗経営, Hepburn: Shinmai Renkinjutsushi no Tenpo Keiei; lit. 'Novice Alchemist's Shop Management') is a Japanese light novel series written by Mizuho Itsuki and illustrated by Fuumi. It began serialization online in November 2018 on the user-generated novel publishing website Shōsetsuka ni Narō. It was later acquired by Fujimi Shobo, who have published seven volumes since September 2019 under their Fujimi Fantasia Bunko imprint. A manga adaptation with art by kirero has been serialized online via Kill Time Communication's Comic Valkyrie website since December 2020. It has been collected in nine tankōbon volumes. An anime television series adaptation produced by ENGI aired from October to December 2022.

== Plot ==
When she was young, Sarasa Feed's parents were killed by bandits. Wanting to honor their memory and to follow in their footsteps, Sarasa enrolls at the Royal Alchemist Academy to train in alchemy. After finishing her studies, she sets up shop at an old house and starts her own apothecary, where she makes potions and sells them to the locals. However, she finds out that running an alchemist shop, whether collecting materials or maintaining finances, is not as easy as it seems, given her large debts. Sarasa, together with her friends Lorea, Iris Lotze, and Kate Starven, work together to serve the villagers while also aiming to get the store out of debt.

== Characters ==
Sarasa Feed (サラサ・フィード, Sarasa Fīdo)
Voiced by: Kanon Takao (Japanese); Brittney Karbowski (English)
A 15-year-old girl and the titular novice alchemist. She was orphaned at a young age and aims to be an alchemist just like her late parents. Although she originally had long hair, she got it cut short by Maria prior to her alchemist's exam. She later starts an isolated rural alchemist shop, trains, and sells goods to make a living.
Lorea (ロレア, Rorea)
Voiced by: Hina Kino (Japanese); Juliet Simmons (English)
A local village girl who helps Sarasa with her alchemist shop. She is skilled with cooking, which she uses at the shop.
Iris Lotze (アイリス・ロッツェ, Airisu Rottse)
Voiced by: Saori Ōnishi (Japanese); Donna Bella Litton (English)
She is healed by Sarasa in the third episode and works at the alchemist shop with Kate, Sarasa, and Lorea, while she is paying off her debts to Sarasa. She is skilled with a sword. Her father is Adelbert Lotze.
Kate Starven (ケイト・スターヴェン, Keito Sutāven)
Voiced by: Nanaka Suwa (Japanese); Jade Kelly (English)
She is an elf and good friend of Iris. She remains a resident at Sarasa's alchemist shop with Kate, with both paying off their debts. Caterina Starven is her mother.
Ophelia Millis (オフィーリア・ミリス, Ofīria Mirisu)
Voiced by: Mitsuki Saiga (Japanese); Molly Searcy (English)
The master of Sarasa, and Master Class Alchemist, she provided Sarasa with the tools she needed to start her own shop. This included an isolate rural shop as a gift to Sarasa, which ends up being decrepit. She manages a magic shop in the capital where Sarasa first worked and made Sarasa's pendant to make sure her magical power did not go wild.
Maria (マリア)
Voiced by: Ami Koshimizu (Japanese); Alyssa Marek (English)
She is the clerk of the magic shop Ophelia runs and is very close to Ophelia.

== Media ==
=== Light novel ===
During their Anime NYC 2023 panel, J-Novel Club announced that they licensed the light novels for English publication.

No.	Release date	ISBN
1	September 20, 2019	9784040733159
2	November 20, 2019	9784040733166
3	March 19, 2020	9784040736372
4	June 19, 2020	9784040737492
5	September 18, 2021	9784040742571
6	September 16, 2022	9784040746890
7	November 18, 2022	9784040746944

=== Manga ===
No.	Release date	ISBN
1	October 8, 2021	978-4-7992-1553-1
2	April 8, 2022	978-4-7992-1620-0
3	October 7, 2022	978-4-7992-1691-0
4	May 8, 2023	978-4-7992-1765-8
5	March 8, 2024	978-4-7992-1874-7
6	September 6, 2024	978-4-7992-1950-8
7	May 8, 2025	978-4-7992-2045-0
8	November 8, 2025	978-4-7992-2105-1
9	July 8, 2026	978-4-7992-2189-1

=== Anime ===
On September 18, 2021, an anime television series adaptation was announced by Fujimi Fantasia Bunko. The series was produced by ENGI and directed by Hiroshi Ikehata, with Shigeru Murakoshi overseeing series scripts, Yōsuke Itō designing the characters and serving as chief animation director, and Harumi Fuuki composing the music. It aired from October 3 to December 19, 2022, on AT-X, Tokyo MX, KBS Kyoto, SUN, and BS NTV. Aguri Ōnishi performed the opening theme song "Hajimaru Welcome" (はじまるウェルカム; "Starting Welcome"), and Nanaka Suwa performed the ending theme song "Fine Days". The series is licensed outside of Asia by Sentai Filmworks, and is streaming on Hidive.

No.	Title	Directed by	Written by	Storyboarded by	Original release date
1	"I Bought a Shop!"; Transliteration: "Omise o Te ni Ireta!" (Japanese: お店を手に入れた！)	Marina Maki	Shigeru Murakoshi	Hiroshi Ikehata	October 3, 2022
Following the death of her parents Sarasa Feed is placed in an orphanage after her parents company is stolen by their greedy business partners. After meeting an alchemist Sarasa is inspired to be like her, studies passionately and is accepted to the Royal Alchemist Academy where she becomes apprentice to Master Alchemist Ophelia Millis. After 5 years she takes her alchemist certification exam and passes with a perfect score. With her life savings she purchases an Alchemical Works; a complete list of all known alchemical techniques, and decides to establish her own alchemy shop and become a famous Master alchemist. Ophelia gives her an alchemist's bag she enchanted herself as a graduation gift. Sarasa purchases the cheapest shop she can find, in the tiny Yok Village surround by forests in the Gelba-Rohha Mountains. Despite it being a month's journey by carriage alchemical plants grows everywhere and can be foraged for free. Ophelia informs her to become a Master Sarasa must perfect all techniques in the first 9 volumes of the Alchemical Works, but only fools attempt the 10th which even Ophelia has not perfected yet. After a month's travel Sarasa reaches her new shop, but finds it completely run down, explaining why it was so cheap.
2	"I Came to the Village!"; Transliteration: "Mura ni Yattekita!" (Japanese: 村にやってきた！)	Yuki Kanazawa	Shigeru Murakoshi	Rin Teraoka	October 10, 2022
Sarasa realises the overgrown garden is actually a herb field containing valuable plants, and despite needing repairs the store still contains the former owners equipment. Sarasa visits the general store where she meets the store owner Darna's daughter, Lorea, and Mrs Elles, Sarasa's new neighbour. Mrs Elles shows her the village where they meet Geberk the carpenter, Gizdo the blacksmith, the Mayor, tavern owner Delal and other villagers. Sarasa struggles to socialise and becomes despondent when drunken villagers play a prank on her. Ophelia visits the next day to give Sarasa a sword since certain ingredients can only be harvested by slaying monsters and insists she train with the sword every day. She also provides a teleportation circle so she and Sarasa can teleport supplies back and forth. After Ophelia leaves Sarasa struggles with feelings of loneliness. Soon after the villagers rally together to provide everything Sarasa still needs and begin repairing the shop, including the apologetic drunks who were thoroughly lectured by Lorea following their prank. Sarasa decides she needs a sales assistant so Lorea volunteers for the job and Sarasa finally opens her store for business. Immediately, Sarasa has an emergency when a young woman is brought to her store with her arm cut off.
3	"A Monster Appears!"; Transliteration: "Mamono ga Deta!" (Japanese: 魔物が出た！)	Akira Katō	Kazuho Hyōdō	Toshihiko Masuda	October 17, 2022
Examining the girl, Iris, Sarasa also diagnoses her with burns and poisoning. Her fellow hunter/gatherers explain she was attacked by a Hellflame Grizzly, a dangerous monster, and their leader Andre and Iris' friend Kate agrees to pay Sarasa's fee, though some of his men complain angrily about the cost. Sarasa reattaches Iris' arm and cures the poison, saving her life. Sarasa worries that having to put a price on saving lives might make her unpopular, and yet if she did it for free she would go out of business and more people would die in the long run. With her training Sarasa easily slays the Grizzly for its valuable alchemical ingredients, but while dissecting it finds evidence the Grizzly was starving, meaning if its food source was running out other Grizzlies in the area might also be starving and attack the village. The angry hunter/gatherers quit their jobs to save themselves. Andre and his remaining men volunteer to fight, as do the villagers. With Sarasa's guidance the Grizzlies are lured into traps and killed. Unfortunately, Sarasa's store is badly damaged which, combined with the potions she supplied for free to assist the fighting and the unpaid bill for Iris' treatment, she has lost a staggering amount of merchandise and money despite her store only being open one day.
4	"Let's Live Together!"; Transliteration: "Issho ni Kurasō!" (Japanese: 一緒に暮らそう！)	Mizuki Sasaki	Hiroko Fukuda	Namako Umino	October 24, 2022
Sarasa asks Iris and Kate to live with her to help run the store. As most of the village needs repairs after the Grizzly attack Sarasa opens the shop to be helpful, despite the store needing repairs also, and even offers a discount to anyone who returns empty potion bottles for reuse. Sarasa negotiates with the Mayor; she will keep the Grizzlies alchemical ingredients and the villagers will share the profits from the meat and skins. Sarasa also plans to establish a relationship with the two alchemists in the next village, South-Straug. The first alchemist tries to cheat her, disheartening her, but the second alchemist, Leonora, is much kinder. After selling the Grizzly parts Sarasa is able to buy ingredients she is short of and still have a small fortune in cash to hire Geberk to repair the store and install a kitchen with a magic stove Sarasa creates through alchemy. As magic stoves do not require fuel, Delal buys two stoves for the tavern for a large amount of money. With the kitchen installed Sarasa has a tea party with Lorea, Kate and Iris. Sarasa ponders creating a new useful product people will want to use every day.
5	"Let's Develop New Products!"; Transliteration: "Shinshōhin o Kaihatsu Shiyō!" (Japanese: 新商品を開発しよう！)	Shigeki Awai	Shigeru Murakoshi	Masaki Ōzora	October 31, 2022
Lorea is stung by a wasp so Sarasa decides to create bug proof veils since stinging insects are a problem for farmers. Sarasa also decides they need a fridge for the kitchen, powered by Frost-bat teeth. Kate and Iris have never hunted bats and it transpires the South-Straug alchemist who tried to cheat Sarasa once cheated the villagers over the bats value, causing the villagers to stop hunting them. In the bats cave Sarasa teaches the hunter/gatherers how to hunt Frost-bats safely since their fangs can freeze a human solid. After hunting the bats Sarasa harvests the valuable fangs and shares them equally with the villagers. Andre is so impressed with Sarasa's gloves, made super durable by alchemy, that he asks for a pair for every hunter/gatherer. With the extra fangs Sarasa also creates hats to keep people cool in hot weather. Feeling she can still do more Sarasa decides she must attract more money into the village from outside. With the mayors approval Sarasa hires the villagers to sew the hats for her before she adds the alchemical cooling properties. In this way she intends to make cooling hats a Yok Village speciality product and sell them to other villages.
6	"Let's Go to the Lake!"; Transliteration: "Mizuumi ni Dekakeyō!" (Japanese: 湖に出掛けよう！)	Chihiro Kumano	Hiroko Fukuda	Hiroshi Ikehata	November 7, 2022
With Sarasa's help more hunter/gatherers come to find employment at the village. A rare ingredient is discovered in a nearby lake, Marsen Clams. Sarasa is uninterested since only female clams are valuable and only experts can tell males from females, so harvesting them is rarely profitable. However Sarasa is convinced when Lorea reveals the clams are also edible. Along the way Sarasa befriends a baby flying-fox monster. While Iris and Kate harvest clams Sarasa begins teaching Lorea to swim. They are suddenly attacked by a Ligarex, a giant eel monster whose slime makes it invulnerable to weapons and uses paralysing electrical magic. The flying-fox accidentally breaks Sarasa's alchemist necklace made for her by Ophelia, causing her magic to create an out of control typhoon that kills the Ligarex. Sarasa reveals to everyone she has an exceptionally high level of magic that is hard to control, so Ophelia made the necklace to make it easier for her. Luckily the typhoon also pulled most of the unharvested clams from the lake, so Sarasa collects the valuable females while Lorea uses the males to make clam chowder and barbecued Ligarex meat while the flying-fox returns to its mother.
7	"My Artifact Broke!"; Transliteration: "Ātifakuto ga Kowareta!" (Japanese: 錬成具(アーティファクト)が壊れた！)	Yuki Kanazawa	Kazuho Hyōdō	Shin'ichi Watanabe	November 14, 2022
Sarasa decides to teleport a letter to Ophelia asking for materials to repair her necklace. Sarasa reminisces on applying to work at Ophelia's store when she was still a young alchemy student. Ophelia was impressed with her knowledge but recognised Sarasa had an overwhelming amount of magic she was incapable of controlling. Ophelia crafted the necklace to limit Sarasa's power and decided to take her as an apprentice. In the present Sarasa prepares to teleport the letter but Iris slips and almost falls into the teleportation circle. Sarasa saves her but drops her necklace which accidentally teleports to Ophelia as well. Without her necklace restraining her power the circle is destroyed. Over several days Sarasa attempts to train her power without the necklace but struggles, worrying her friends. Ophelia reminisces that she never wanted an apprentice, until her friend/secretary Maria convinced her she needed Sarasa as much as Sarasa needed her. With the circle broken Ophelia decides to return the necklace herself. After three days Sarasa is worried she may never work as an alchemist again, until Ophelia finally arrives and repairs the necklace and the circle. She worries Sarasa is pushing herself too much but is reassured seeing she runs a fine shop with excellent friends and returns to the city confident Sarasa is doing fine.
8	"A Business Rival Appeared!"; Transliteration: "Shōbaigataki ga Arawareta!" (Japanese: 商売敵が現れた！)	Hideki Tonokatsu	Shigeru Murakoshi	Namako Umino	November 21, 2022
A new merchant begins buying Frost-bat fangs, offering more money for them than Sarasa, deliberately undermining her business. Andre is suspicious as the merchant employs bandits. Lorea is upset as her grandparents were killed by bandits, just like Sarasa's parents. Sarasa temporarily increases how much she pays to buy teeth then has Iris resell those teeth to the merchant who quickly begins to run out of money. Sarasa deduces the merchant sells his teeth in South Straug and learns from Leonora that the merchant, Gree Dilly, owns an alchemy company and specialises in forcing alchemists to work for him by putting their shops out of business, like he is trying to do to Sarasa. Sarasa continues outwitting Gree, costing him so much money he borrows money from criminals to keep his own company open. Sarasa is attacked by Gree's bandits but defeats them. Gree is forced to sell his huge supply of teeth to Sarasa for a pittance, but cannot repay his debts to the criminals, leaving his fate uncertain. Sarasa sells all the teeth to Ophelia and uses the money to pay the debts of Gree's alchemists, freeing them to reopen their own shops and become useful business contacts should Sarasa require help in the future.
9	"Let's Go Gather Honey!"; Transliteration: "Hachimitsu o Tori ni Ikō!" (Japanese: 蜂蜜を採りに行こう！)	Shūji Yoshida	Hiroko Fukuda	Toshihiko Masuda	November 28, 2022
With autumn approaching demand for Sarasa's cooling hats dwindles. Needing easier contact with Leonora and the alchemists who now owe her a lot of money after she paid their debts to Gree, Sarasa creates a Shared-Sound Box to talk to Leonora from far away. As Iris and Kate want to finally pay their debts to Sarasa she sends them and the hunter/gatherers to harvest honey from Fruitrot Bees, an expensive delicacy. Sarasa begins studying the next volume of her Alchemical Works and creates a Floating Tent that is easy to use due to needing no tent poles to stay upright. Lorea is certain it will be popular with the hunter/gatherers for hunting trips. The hunter/gatherers sell the honey to Sarasa, unfortunately they, Kate and Iris fall ill with bathroom troubles, having tasted the honey which is poisonous when raw. Sarasa crafts an antidote but to keep it cheap enough to not put Iris and Kate back into debt, she skips several expensive steps that leave the potion effective but unimaginably disgusting. With everyone recovered Andrea buys Sarasa's first tent, reassuring her it will be a popular product. Iris' father and Kate's mother abruptly visit the store.
10	"Let's Settle Things With Money!"; Transliteration: "Okane de Kaiketsu Shiyō!" (Japanese: お金で解決しよう！)	Yūri Hagiwara	Kazuho Hyōdō	Ice Mugino	December 5, 2022
Iris' father, Sir Adelbert, and his servant Caterina, Kate's mother, have come to fetch Iris. Iris explains Adelbert is a knight, but during a famine he used his wealth to ensure his people avoided starvation. As a result their family is in debt to Baron Yokuo. A young merchant named Shay Dilly has offered to pay the debt, but only if Iris marries him. Sarasa realises Shay must be Gree's brother who inherited the alchemy company after Gree was murdered. As the Dilly Company is bankrupt Shay should not be able to afford Adelbert's debt, unless he is conspiring with Yokuo to take over Adelbert's knighthood. Adelbert decides to delay the engagement until Sarasa can have Leonora investigate Shay thoroughly. Elyn, a hunter/gatherer, informs Sarasa the investigation into the Hellflame Grizzlies has been cancelled by Yokuo, so Sarasa decides to investigate herself with Andre and his men. In Grizzly territory they discover a nest of Lava Lizards, which eat the same Flame Stones as the Grizzlies and have taken over Grizzly territory. Sarasa is surprised there are so many living on one volcano and slaughters several for their alchemical body parts. A massive earthquake suddenly collapses the top of the volcano and Sarasa realises the volcano has been inhabited by a Salamander.
11	"Let's Defeat a Salamander!"; Transliteration: "Saramandā o Taosō!" (Japanese: サラマンダーを倒そう！)	Marina Maki	Shigeru Murakoshi	Hiroshi Ikehata	December 12, 2022
Sarasa and the group report to Elyn it is unlikely the Salamander or Lizards will leave the volcano to attack the village. However, Sarasa reveals the alchemical ingredients from such a large Salamander would pay Adelbert's debt in full, though hunting it will be dangerous. Iris and Kate volunteer without hesitation and even Ophelia agrees it needs to be hunted; if it causes the volcano to erupt the entire ecosystem would be destroyed. Sarasa begins crafting heat proof equipment and ice weapons using Frost-Bat teeth and assistance from all the friends and contacts she has made so far. Two weeks later the work is complete but Sarasa finds the Lizard population has grown alarmingly and the constant earthquakes have altered the landscape around the volcano. Ophelia is shown following them secretly. Entering the volcano Iris and Kate distract the Salamander with ice weapons while Sarasa removes her necklace, freeing all her magic at once to cast an ultimate freezing spell. Sarasa begins to pass out but is inspired when Ophelia shouts encouragement to her. Both the erupting volcano and the Salamander are frozen solid, killing it and preventing further earthquakes. After two weeks of work plus the difficult battle Sarasa instantly falls asleep in Iris' arms.
12	"Management of a Novice Alchemist"; Transliteration: "Shinmai Renkinjutsushi no Tenpo Keiei" (Japanese: 新米錬金術師の店舗経営)	Chihiro Kumano	Shigeru Murakoshi	Hiroaki Shimura	December 19, 2022
With Adelbert's debts paid Iris is saved from marrying Shay. A letter arrives from Leroy, head clerk of the Feed Company stolen from Sarasa's parents, informing her the employees want her to return as the rightful owner. Lorea is visibly worried Sarasa might leave. Sarasa decides she must visit the company before she can decide. As the trip will take a month she asks Lorea to run the shop in her absence. At the Feed Company Leroy admits the company was never actually stolen, but it was left with incredibly huge debts following her parents' deaths. Fearing Sarasa was both too young and heartbroken by her parents deaths Leroy and the other employees placed her in the orphanage and have loyally spent 7 years dragging her company out of debt. Still unsure Sarasa spends the day observing how the employees run the company and asks Ophelia for advice. Ophelie is sure Sarasa's parents would care more about her happiness than the company. Lorea begins to struggle without Sarasa as only she can make potions and diagnose illnesses. Sarasa abruptly returns and announces she will stay in Yok with Leroy managing Feed Company as her official business partner. The village is overjoyed by her return, particularly Lorea, and Sarasa happily resumes managing her shop as a novice alchemist.

== See also ==
- To Another World... with Land Mines!, another light novel series with the same writer
- The Villager of Level 999, another light novel series with the same illustrator
