= Aika Kobayashi =

Japanese voice actress and singer

- 小林 愛香
- Born: October 23, 1993 (age 33); Kanagawa Prefecture, Japan
- Other name: Aikyan
- Occupations: Singer; voice actress
- Years active: 2011–present
- Agent: Voice Kit
- Height: 156 cm (5 ft 1 in)
- Musical career
- Labels: Media Factory (2011–2012); Toy's Factory (2020–2026); Lantis (2026–present)
- Website: kobayashiaika.jp

Aika Kobayashi (小林 愛香, Kobayashi Aika; born October 23, 1993) is a Japanese singer and voice actress from Kanagawa Prefecture. Kobayashi is affiliated with VOICE KIT. . She is best known for her role as Yoshiko Tsushima in the multimedia franchise Love Live! Sunshine!!.

== Biography ==
Kobayashi was born on October 23, 1993, at Kanagawa Prefecture. She is good at dancing. She is 1/4 of Korean descent, with her mother being mixed Korean and Ryukyuan, while her father is Japanese. Kobayashi learned ballet at the age of 5 and hip hop at third year of elementary school.

In 2011, Kobayashi debuted as a singer for TV anime Freezing ending theme, "Kimi o Mamoritai" (君を守りたい) and was released as a split single with its opening theme. In 2012, Kobayashi released a single for TV anime Queen's Blade Rebellion ending theme, "Future is Serious". Both singles are released under Media Factory's record labels.

In 2015, Kobayashi debuted as a voice actress with Love Live! Sunshine!! as Yoshiko Tsushima. Kobayashi belonged to the idol group Aqours and its sub unit Guilty Kiss along with Rikako Aida and Aina Suzuki. Kobayashi is nicknamed "Aikyan" by both fans and Aqours members.

In November 2016, Kobayashi was announced to be one of the permanent hosts in Love Live! Sunshine!!'s radio program along with Anju Inami and Arisa Komiya.

In 2019, she released "NO LIFE CODE", her debut single.

== Works ==
=== Filmography ===
==== Anime ====
- Love Live! Sunshine!! as Yoshiko Tsushima
- Our love has always been 10 centimeters apart as Student B
- Piace: My Italian Cooking as Rii Kagetsu
- Farewell, My Dear Cramer as Yū Tenma
- Yohane the Parhelion: Sunshine in the Mirror as Yohane
- Magical Girl Lyrical Nanoha Exceeds Gun Blaze Vengeance as Yuuna Kitamori

==== Video games ====
- Love Live! School Idol Festival as Yoshiko Tsushima
- Uchi no Hime-sama ga Ichiban Kawaii as Bikyaku Hime Leg Bonito
- Love Live! School Idol Festival ALL STARS as Yoshiko Tsushima
- Yohane the Parhelion: Blaze in the Deepblue as Yohane

=== Radio ===
- Love Live! Sunshine!! Aqours Uranohoshi Jogakuin Radio!!! (2016, Hibiki Radio Station)

== Discography ==
=== Studio albums ===
| Year | Album details | Catalog no. | Oricon chart |
|---|---|---|---|
| 2021 | Gradation Collection: "Sora wa Dare ka no Mono Janai" (空は誰かのものじゃない) was used as theme song for movie Sayonara Watashi no Cramer First Touch; "Can You Sing Along?" was used as insert song for the same movie; Released: June 23, 2021; Label: Toy's Factory | TFCC-86769/70; TFCC-86771/2; TFCC-86773 | |

=== Singles ===
| Year | Song | Catalog no. | Oricon chart | Album |
|---|---|---|---|---|
| 2011 | "Color"/"Kimi o Mamoritai" (COLOR/君を守りたい): Ending theme for TV anime Freezing; Split single with Maria; Released: February 23, 2011; Label: Media Factory | ZMCZ-7059 | 35 | |
| 2012 | "Future Is Serious": Ending theme for TV anime Queen's Blade Rebellion; Released: April 25, 2012; Label: Media Factory | ZMCZ-7838 | 139 | |
| 2020 | "No Life Code": Released: February 26, 2020; Label: Toy's Factory | TFCC-89677; TFCC-89678 | 9 | Gradation Collection (2021) |
| 2021 | "Tough Heart": Opening theme for TV anime Shin Chūka Ichiban!; Released: January 27, 2021; Label: Toy's Factory | TFCC-89695; TFCC-89696 | 7 | Gradation Collection (2021) |
| 2021 | "Ambitious Goal": Opening theme for TV anime Farewell, My Dear Cramer; Released: April 5, 2021 (digital); Label: Toy's Factory | - | | Gradation Collection (2021) |

=== Participation work ===
| Release date | Title | Label | Package number | Song | Source |
|---|---|---|---|---|---|
| July 2, 2014 | "Nobunaga the Fool Original Soundtrack 2" | Lantis | LACA-15417 | Track 19 "Miko no Inori" (巫女の祈り) | |
