= Icey =

2016 video game

ICEY
- Developer: FantaBlade Network
- Publisher: X.D. Network
- Platforms: iOS; macOS; Microsoft Windows; PlayStation 4; Android; Nintendo Switch
- Release: iOS, Mac, Windows, PS4; November 17, 2016; Android; October 25, 2017; Nintendo Switch; May 31, 2018
- Genre: Hack and slash
- Mode: Single-player

Icey is a 2D side-scrolling hack-and-slash video game developed by FantaBlade Network and published by X.D. Network. It was released for iOS, macOS, Microsoft Windows, and PlayStation 4 in November 2016, for Android in October 2017, and Nintendo Switch in May 2018. The game involves a female cyborg's mission to defeat a villain named Judas and his robot minions, and can be played in a linear manner from beginning to end like a typical game. Alternately, the player may disobey the narrator's instructions and in doing so break the fourth wall. The game received positive reviews from critics, who commended it as a good video game in its own right, elevated by its unusual meta-commentary.

== Plot ==
The game revolves around Icey, a female cyborg who is on a mission to kill the evil Judas, who has supposedly destroyed the world, for unclear reasons. She fights against various small and large robotic enemies. However, if the player strays outside the directions given to them by the narrator, he becomes frustrated and even angry. At this point the game devolves into a meta-commentary on game development, with the game's developer even talking directly to the player.

== Gameplay ==
The game plays as a 2D hack-and-slash game. The player uses a single weapon, but can perform quick combos with their sword. There is no block, but rather a dash that allows the player to become invulnerable - the player can also refill their shields by killing stunned enemies with a special kill move.

== Development ==
The game initially contained Chinese voice-overs with English subtitles, but English and Japanese-language voice-overs were later added.

== Reception ==
Reception

Aggregate score
Aggregator	Score
Metacritic	PC: 84/100; PS4: 81/100; NS: 74/100

ICEY received an aggregate score of 84/100 for its Windows version on Metacritic. Sawovsky of PLAY! Zine rated the game 8/10, calling the gameplay "excellent" and the meta-story "amusing", but criticizing its short length. Mateusz Zdanowicz of Eurogamer Poland rated the game 9/10 and gave it the Eurogamer Recommended award, calling the game "addictive" and its story "intriguing". Richard Atkinson of Nintendo Life rated the game 8/10, saying that while the game is short, exploring is enjoyable and the storytelling delivery "ingenious", but criticized its "simplistic" approach to battles.

== Sales ==
The game sold over 2 million copies by August 2018.
