= Kanako Takatsuki =

Japanese voice actress (born 1993)

- 高槻 かなこ
- Born: September 25, 1993 (age 33); Hyōgo Prefecture, Japan
- Occupations: Singer; voice actress
- Years active: 2012–present
- Agent: AxiS Management
- Notable credit: Love Live! Sunshine!! as Hanamaru Kunikida
- Height: 165.5 cm (5 ft 5 in)
- Spouse: Unknown (m. 2025)
- Musical career
- Genre: J-pop
- Instrument: Vocals
- Labels: Victor Entertainment; Lantis

Kanako Takatsuki (高槻 かなこ, Takatsuki Kanako; born September 25, 1993) is a Japanese singer and voice actress from Hyōgo Prefecture. She is previously affiliated with Amuse and her single is released under label Victor Entertainment.

== Career ==
After graduating from middle school, Takatsuki went to Himawari Theater Group where she studied acting.

Takatsuki debuted as a singer in September 2012 with the release of the song "Bonjō Cinderella no Shiruke no Aru Onegai" (凡常シンデレラの汁気のあるお願い). Takatsuki is also an utaite (one who covers songs and uploads them in Niconico) under the name "Kako" (かあこ); one song she covered is Konomi Suzuki's "This Game," which was used as the opening theme for the anime series No Game No Life.

In 2015, Takatsuki began her career as a voice actress in the multimedia project Love Live! Sunshine!! as Hanamaru Kunikida and currently belongs to its group unit Aqours. Takatsuki also belongs to its sub-unit AZALEA along with Arisa Komiya and Nanaka Suwa. Takatsuki is nicknamed "King" by both fans and fellow Aqours members. However, she has since requested fans not to call her "King", and is now often referred to as "Kinchan" instead, as of September 2017.

Every Thursday, Takatsuki plays PlayStation 4 for Dengeki PlayStation in their NicoNicoLive Community.

On June 10, 2019, Takatsuki announced that she has formed a vocal and dance performance unit called BlooDye, with her as the lead singer.

In 2020, Takatsuki made her major debut as a solo singer with the release of the single "Anti-world"; the title song was used as the first opening theme to the anime television series I'm Standing on a Million Lives.

On December 31, 2024, she left Amuse and moved to Axis Management in July 2025.

== Personal life ==
Takatsuki was born in Hyōgo Prefecture, Japan. She also lived in Kansai for 15 years, but claimed she can't speak in Kansai dialect. Takatsuki has lived in Ibaraki, Osaka as well. She is the middle child and has two sisters.

On December 28, 2024, Takatsuki announced that she had gotten married. Photos from her wedding were leaked online, which her agency since condemned and threatened action in response. Takatsuki publicly elaborated on her marriage in September 2025, explaining she married an Indian national living in Japan and denying online rumors that he was part of royalty.

== Works ==
=== Voice acting roles ===
==== Anime ====
- Love Live! Sunshine!! as Hanamaru Kunikida
- Love and Lies as Ayano Katō
- I'm Standing on a Million Lives as Majiha Purple
- Vlad Love as Kaori Konno
- Yohane the Parhelion: Sunshine in the Mirror as Hanamaru

==== Web Anime ====
- Uma no Friends as Kurige

==== Video games ====
- King's Raid as Laias
- Love Live! School Idol Festival as Hanamaru Kunikida
- Love Live! School Idol Festival All Stars as Hanamaru Kunikida
- Toukiden 2 as Megohime; Kichi Saitō
- Yohane the Parhelion: Blaze in the Deepblue as Hanamaru

==== Web Radio ====
- Kanako to Sarara (Chō! A&G+Niconico: 2017 - )

=== Lyrics ===
- "Yowamushi Signal" from her debut single "Bonjō Cinderella no Shiruke no Aru Onegai"
- "Kotoba Tsubomi Signal" from album "Go! Go! 575 Sound & Movie Collection" from Project 575, sung by Yuzu Yosano (voiced by Minako Kotobuki)

== Discography ==
=== Singles ===
	Release date	Title	Package Number
	September 26, 2012	Bonjō Cinderella no Shiruke no Aru Onegai	VICL-36726
1	October 14, 2020	Anti World	LACM-24023

=== Covers ===
Title	Original Artist(s)	Note	Source
Alicemagic ~TV animation ver.~	Rita	Little Busters! ED theme	
A・ri・ga・to・YESTERDAYS	Haruka (Eriko Nakamura), Makoto (Hiromi Hirata), Miki (Akiko Hasegawa), Ritsuko (Naomi Wakabayashi)	Puchimas! Petit Idolmaster OP theme	
Donna Toki mo Zutto	μ's	Love Live! 2nd ED theme	
Gomen ne, Iiko ja Irarenai.	Miku Sawai	Kill La Kill ED theme	
Hajimari no Resolution	Yuki Kanno	Zettai boei Leviathan OP theme	
Koi wa Chaos no Shimobe nari	Kana Asumi, Miyu Matsuki, Yuka Otsubo	Haiyore! Nyaruko-san W OP theme	
Little Busters!	Rita	Little Busters! OP theme	
This Game	Konomi Suzuki	No Game No Life OP theme	
Shiawase High Tension	Rina Satō, Marina Inoue, Minori Chihara	Minami-ke Tadaima OP theme	
Sister's Noise	fripSide	To Aru Kagaku no Railgun S OP theme	
Zero!!!	Minami Kuribayashi	Hataraku Maou-sama! OP theme	
Yo-kai Exercise #1	Dream5	Yo-kai Watch ED theme	
Yume Sketch	JAM Project	Bakuman 3rd season 2nd ED theme	
