= Anju Inami =

Japanese actress

- 伊波 杏樹
- Born: February 7, 1996 (age 30); Saitama Prefecture, Japan
- Other name: Anchan
- Occupations: Actress; voice actress
- Years active: 2013–present
- Agent: Sony Music Artists
- Notable work: Love Live! Sunshine!! as Chika Takami
- Height: 158 cm (5 ft 2 in)
- Website: anjuinami.com

Anju Inami (伊波 杏樹, Inami Anju; born February 7, 1996) is a Japanese actress and voice actress from Saitama. Inami is currently affiliated with Sony Music Artists. She is best known for her role as Chika Takami in Love Live! Sunshine!!

== Biography ==
Inami graduated from Yoyogi Animation School. She aspired to become a voice actress after watching the anime series Clannad.

Inami won the second Grand Prix of Sony Music Artists' Anistoteles in 2012. While Inami was working as a stage actress, she debuted as a voice actress in a short animation Hinata no Aoshigure.

Inami was a Love Live! and μ's fan prior to her professional involvement with the franchise, even having balloted for (and attended) a μ's concert. Inami was introduced to Love Live! when a friend showed her Love Live! School Idol Festival. Inami was later cast as the main character, Chika Takami, in the series' successor Love Live! Sunshine!!. Along with eight other members, Inami is part of its idol group Aqours and sub-unit CYaRon! (シャロン, pronounced "Sharon") along with Shuka Saitō (voice of You Watanabe) and Ai Furihata (voice of Ruby Kurosawa). Inami is nicknamed "Anchan" by both fans and fellow Aqours members.

Inami had an online radio show titled "Inami Anju no Hachamecha Mechamecha Ii Desu ka!?" (伊波杏樹のハチャメチャめちゃめちゃいいですか！？) which aired between April and June 2016 on AG-ON. In November 2016, it was announced that Inami would be one of the permanent hosts of the Love Live! Sunshine!! radio program along with Arisa Komiya and Aika Kobayashi.

== Filmography ==
=== Anime ===
- Animegatari as Erika
- Animegataris as Erika Aoyama
- Build Divide -#FFFFFF (Code White)- as Melissa
- Our love has always been 10 centimeters apart as Student A
- Love Live! Sunshine!! as Chika Takami
- Sonny Boy & Dewdrop Girl as Hinata
- Wonder Momo (web anime) as Yumi Fujita
- Yohane the Parhelion: Sunshine in the Mirror as Chika
- You Can Enjoy! (web anime) as Aizujidori, Kawamatashamo

=== Games ===
- Azur Lane as Isokaze, Noshiro
- BATON=RELAY as Akari Koen
- Brown Dust as Yuri
- Duel Masters PLAY'S as Churin
- Granblue Fantasy as Aqours Second-Years
- Heaven Burns Red as Megumi Aikawa
- Koku no Ishtaria (Age of Ishtaria) as Lancelot, Yoichi, Isola
- Lemuria ~Strada of Chain~ as Aoi
- Like a Dragon: Infinite Wealth as Chitose Fujinomiya
- Love Live! School Idol Festival as Chika Takami
- Monster Strike as Watson, Lindwurm
- Nyangrila as Natasha
- Shadowverse as Chika Takami, Mechaboomerang Elf, Moonlight Vampire, Sweetwing Seraph
- Shooting Girls as Remi Yonehira
- To Heart: Heartful Party as Hina Mitsuhoshi
- Tokyo 7th Sisters as Jedah Diamond
- Yohane the Parhelion: Blaze in the Deepblue as Chika

=== Dubbing ===
- Creeped Out as Narrator
- Domovoy as Alina
- Dreambuilders as Minna
- Pitch Perfect (Parco/Happinet edition) as Becca
- Spider-Man: Homecoming as Cindy

=== Stage ===
Year	Title	Role	Notes	Source
2013	Taishō Roman Tantei Tan	Akino Sōma		
2015	Live Spectacle Naruto	Ino Yamanaka		
2015	Teekyu	Yuri Oshimoto		
2015	Super Dangan Ronpa 2 The Stage ~Sayonara Zetsubō Gakuen~	Mioda Ibuki		
2016	Jyukai-Den -Tōgen-	Hanabayashi		
2016	Live Fantasy Fairy Tail	Angel		
2016	Hell Girl	Rina Takeda	Double cast with Rihona Kato	
2017	Super Dangan Ronpa 2 The Stage ~Sayonara Zetsubō Gakuen~ 2017	Mioda Ibuki		
2017	Black Dice	Mei Usuda	Double cast with Moeno Nitō	
2018	Bastidores -Gakuya-	Eri Asai		
2018	Cyrano	Roxane	Stage reading	
2018	Antiism	Nana Kujō		
2019	Kami no Kiba: Jinga Tensei	Tomoha	Double cast with Erina Oda	
2019	Galaxy Express 999 Sayonara Maetel ~ Boku no Eien	Maetel	Double cast with Haruka Kinoshita	
2019	Watashi no Atama no Naka no Keshigomu 11th Letter	Kaoru	Stage reading	
2019	Love's Labour's Lost	Katharine	Musical	
2021	Ghost Writer	Constance		
2021	Interview	Joan Senior	Musical, double cast with Nonoka Yamaguchi	
2021	Clara -Ai no Monogatari-	Clara	Stage reading	
2021	SF Jidai Katsugeki Niji-iro Tōgarashi	Natane		
2021	My Hero Academia The "Ultra" Stage: A True Hero PLUS ULTRA ver.	Himiko Toga		
2021	MOTHERLAND		Guest appearance	
2022	My Hero Academia The "Ultra" Stage: A Symbol of Peace	Himiko Toga		
2022	DOROTHY ~Ozu no Mahōtsukai~	Witch of the East	Musical	

=== Radio ===
- Inami Anju no Hachamecha Mechamecha Ii Desu ka!? (2016, AG-ON)
- Love Live! Sunshine!! Aqours Uranohoshi Jogakuin Radio!! (2016 – present, Hibiki Radio Station)
- Appare Inami! Ichimei-sama Yattemāsu (2018 – present, MBS Radio)
- Ami to Anju no Dinner Time (2018, Niconico Live)
- Town Radio (2018 – 2021, SMA VOICE)
- Inami Anju no Radio Curtain Call (2018 – 2023, Chō! A&G+)

== Discography ==
Release Date	Title	Artist	Album/Single	Note
2015
12-02	"Good Shepherd"	Anju Inami	『Daitoshokan no Hitsujikai -Library Party-』OP&EDTheme 「Good Shepherd」「Life, Like, Party!」	-
12-30	"LOVE☆DON!!"	Anju Inami	Rejet Sound Collection vol.2 「LOVE GEYSER」	Situation CD LOVE☆DON!! (theme song)
2016
03-30	"Anime wo Katare! Animegatari Dōkōkai no Theme~"	Maya (Inori Minase); Erika (Anju Inami)	Anime wo Katare! ~Animegatari Dōkōkai no Theme~	Short animation by Toho
03-30	"Jigen no Hate Made Koiseyo Otome"	Maya (Inori Minase); Erika (Anju Inami)	Anime wo Katare! ~Animegatari Dōkōkai no Theme~	Short animation by Toho
03-30	"Twilight Day's"	Maya (Inori Minase); Erika (Anju Inami)	Anime wo Katare! ~Animegatari Dōkōkai no Theme~	Short animation by Toho
