= Ai Furihata =

Japanese voice actress (born 1994)

- 降幡 愛
- Born: February 19, 1994 (age 32); Nagano Prefecture, Japan
- Other names: Aiai (あいあい); Furirin (ふりりん)
- Occupations: Voice actress; Singer
- Years active: 2014–present
- Agent: Across Entertainment
- Notable work: Love Live! Sunshine!! as Ruby Kurosawa; Project Sekai: Colorful Stage! feat. Hatsune Miku as Airi Momoi
- Height: 148 cm (4 ft 10 in)
- Musical career
- Genres: J-pop; Anison; City pop; Synthpop
- Instrument: Vocals
- Years active: 2020–present
- Label: Purple One Star
- Website: furihataai.jp

Ai Furihata (降幡 愛, Furihata Ai; born February 19, 1994) is a Japanese voice actress and singer from Nagano Prefecture. She is affiliated with Across Entertainment.

Furihata made her debut as solo singer in Fall 2020 with her first mini album, "Moonrise" as the first artist affiliated with a new music label under Bandai Namco Arts and Blue Sofa, Purple One Star. She is best known for her role as Ruby Kurosawa in the Love Live! Sunshine!! anime series.

== Biography ==
Furihata was born on February 19 in the Nagano Prefecture and her height is 148 cm. Furihata's hobbies are listening to music and collecting T-shirts. Some of Furihata's achievements include Word Processor Practical Certification Grade 2 and Calligraphy Skill Certification Grade 3.

In 2015, Furihata made her debut as a voice actress with Love Live! Sunshine!! as Ruby Kurosawa. While under Aqours, Furihata also grouped into its sub-unit CYaRon! along with Anju Inami (voice of Chika Takami) and Shuka Saitō (voice of You Watanabe). Furihata is nicknamed Furirin and Aiai by both Aqours members and fans.

== Works ==
=== Voice acting roles ===
==== Anime ====
- Love Live! Sunshine!! as Ruby Kurosawa
- Orange as Saku (eps 13)
- Healin' Good Pretty Cure as Element Spirit Water
- Rail Romanesque as Iyo
- Dragon Quest: The Adventure of Dai as Gome-chan
- I'm Standing on a Million Lives as Majiha Pink
- Yohane the Parhelion: Sunshine in the Mirror as Ruby
- Astro Note as Teruko Matsubara
- Girls Band Cry as Shiomi Miura
- The Mononoke Lecture Logs of Chuzenji-sensei as Atsuko Chuzenji
- The Villainess Is Adored by the Prince of the Neighbor Kingdom as Pearl

==== Anime films ====
- Colorful Stage! The Movie: A Miku Who Can't Sing as Airi Momoi

==== Video games ====
- The Alchemist Code as Lisbeth Van Rustburg
- Knights of Girls as Saturn; Comet; Sanadi
- KRITIKA as Zenith; Jennifer
- Love Live! School Idol Festival as Ruby Kurosawa
- Quiz RPG: Mahōtsukai to Kuroneko no Wiz as Kaede
- Shironeko Project as Alexander; Chitcho; Gries
- Icey as ICEY
- Project Sekai: Colorful Stage! feat. Hatsune Miku as Airi Momoi
- Ash Arms as ZSU-37
- Yohane the Parhelion: Blaze in the Deepblue as Ruby

==== Dubbing ====
- Drift as Tina
- More than Blue as Bonnie (Emma Wu)

=== Internet Program ===
- Love Live! Sunshine!! Aqours Niconama Kagai Katsudō ~Trio da yo! Ichi, Ni no Sunshine!!~ (Niconico, since February 5, 2016)

=== Others ===
- Voice Academia (April 7, 2013 - March 30, 2014, BS Fuji) as assistant MC
- Tottemo Yasashii Amae-Chanas Amae-Chan

== Discography ==
=== Studio albums ===
Title	Details	Peak chart positions
Title	Details	JPN Hot
Super Moon	Released: November 8, 2023; Label: Purple One Star; Formats: CD, digital download, streaming	82

=== Extended plays ===
Title	Details	Peak chart positions		Sales
Title	Details	JPN	JPN Hot	Sales
Moonrise	Released: September 23, 2020; Label: Purple One Star; Formats: CD, digital download, streaming	18	20	JPN: 5,197
Make Up (メイクアップ, Meiku Appu)	Released: December 23, 2020; Label: Purple One Star; Formats: CD, digital download, streaming	48	45	JPN: 2,472
Memories of Romance in Summer	Released: April 27, 2022; Label: Purple One Star; Formats: CD, digital download, streaming	—	74	
Memories of Romance in Driving	Released: September 28, 2022; Label: Purple One Star; Formats: CD, digital download, streaming	35	40	JPN: 1,533
Cold Moon	Released: December 5, 2025; Label: Purple One Star; Formats: CD, digital download, streaming	43	—	JPN: 996
"—" denotes a recording that did not chart.

=== Singles ===
Title	Year	Peak chart positions			Sales	Album
Title	Year	JPN	JPN Sales	JPN Down.	Sales	Album
"City"	2020	—	—	77		Moonrise
"Purple Eyeshadow" (パープルアイシャドウ, Pāpuru Aishadou)	2020	—	—	—		Make Up
"Axiom"	2021	—	—	—		Non-album single
"Secret Sugar" (シークレット・シュガー, Shīkuretto Shugā)	2021	—	—	—		"Honeymoon" (single)
"Honeymoon" (ハネムーン, Hanemūn)	2021	29	31	—	JPN: 1,620	"Honeymoon" (single)
"Higashi kara Nishi e" (東から西へ; "From East to West")	2021	34	42	—	JPN: 1,557	Non-album single
"Play Boy"	2023	—	—	—		Super Moon
"Fashion"	2023	—	—	—		Super Moon
"Super Moon"	2023	—	—	—		Super Moon
"Hohoemi no Oto" (ホホエミノオト, "Smile Note")	2024	24	23	—	JPN: 2,082	Non-album single
"Cold Moon"	2025	—	—	—		Cold Moon
"—" denotes a recording that did not chart.

=== Video albums ===
- Ai Furihata 1st Live Tour Apollo at Zepp Diver City (Tokyo) (2021)
