= Rikako Aida =

Japanese voice actress

- 逢田 梨香子
- Born: 8 August 1992 (age 34); Tokyo, Japan
- Other name: Rikako Itō (伊藤 梨香子)
- Occupations: Actress; voice actress; singer
- Years active: 2014–present
- Agent: Ken Production
- Height: 152 cm (5 ft 0 in)
- Musical career
- Genres: J-Pop; Anison
- Instrument: Vocals
- Years active: 2019–present
- Label: DMM musics/Astro Voice
- Website: rikakoaida.com

Rikako Aida (逢田 梨香子, Aida Rikako; born 8 August 1992), previously known under the stage name Rikako Itō (伊藤 梨花子, Itō Rikako), is a Japanese actress and singer. She is best known for her role as Riko Sakurauchi from Love Live! Sunshine!!. She is affiliated with Ken Production. In 2019, her song "Ordinary Love" was used as the ending theme to the anime series Senryu Girl. Her song "for..." is used as the opening theme to the anime series Val × Love.

== Career ==
=== Until her voice acting debut ===
Aida grew up as the only child of a single mother. In the second grade, she moved to Los Angeles, California with her mother in order to study abroad, where she lived for four years.

Aida returned to Japan when she was in the fifth grade. Soon after, she began child acting and modeling. When Aida was in her first year of high school, she met a director and decided she wanted to begin professional acting. In her third year of high school, she was given the opportunity to act in a stage production directed by the same director she had previously met.

After graduating from high school, Aida worked part-time without pursuing higher education, and later enrolled in the first-year basic course of the training school operated by Ken Production. She would go on to study for a year in the basic course and two years total in the training school, resulting in her being cast as Riko Sakurauchi in Love Live! Sunshine!!. In 2014, while enrolled in the training school, she made her voice acting debut in Pac-Man and the Ghostly Adventures as Ghost.

Aida was previously active under the name "Rikako Itō". At the time, she was a member of From First Production.

=== After debut as a voice actress ===
In 2015, Aida began performing with Aqours in the first season of Love Live! Sunshine!!.

In February 2017, Aida performed in Aqours' first live performance at Yokohama Arena. In March of the same year, Aqours was awarded the Singing Award at the 11th Seiyu Awards. On August 25, 2017, Aida performed her first leading role in the movie Kuma no Gakkō: Patissier Jackie to Ohisama no Sweet as Jackie. "Animelo Summer Live 2017 -THE CARD-" (commonly known as "Anisama") was held on the first day of the release of "Kuma no Gakkō". On November 16, 2016, she appeared in the intro gravure of "Weekly Young Jump".

On July 18, 2018, it was announced that Aida would be the first playable character in the smartphone game "Maplas + Girlfriend" (as Yuka Komiya). On July 19, her first photo book "R.A." was released, with cumulative circulation reaching 28,000 copies.

The movie Love Live! Sunshine!! The School Idol Movie: Over the Rainbow was released in January 2019. In March of the same year, she announced her debut as a solo singer as the first artist of "DMM music" (a music label jointly operated by DMM.com and A-Sketch).

== Filmography ==
=== Anime television series ===
- Concrete Revolutio (2015) as Young Boy (ep 1)
- Kabaneri of the Iron Fortress (2016) as Citizen (ep 4); Ichinoshin (ep 2); Sei (ep 3)
- Love Live! Sunshine!! (2016) as Riko Sakurauchi
- Macross Delta (2016) as Woman (ep 14)
- My Hero Academia (2016) as Katsuki's friend (ep 7)
- Sagrada Reset (2017) as Sawako Sera
- Love Live! Sunshine!! 2nd Season (2017) as Riko Sakurauchi
- Blend S (2017) as High School Girl (ep 8)
- Pop Team Epic (2018) as Iyo Sakuraba (ep 5)
- Senryu Girl (2019) as Koto Ōtsuki
- Val × Love (2019) as Shino Saotome
- LBX Girls (2021) as Riko
- Those Snow White Notes (2021) as Yuna Tachiki
- The Aquatope on White Sand (2021) as Fūka Miyazawa
- Yohane the Parhelion: Sunshine in the Mirror (2023) as Riko
- Narenare: Cheer for You! (2024) as Hiiragi Kanzaki
- Princession Orchestra (2025) as Aiko Nezu

As Rikako Itō

- Pac-Man and the Ghostly Adventures (2014) as Ghost
- Bakumatsu Rock (2014)

=== Theatrical animation ===
- Kuma no Gakkou: Patissier Jackie to Ohisama no Sweet (2017) as Jackie
- Love Live! Sunshine!! The School Idol Movie Over the Rainbow (2019) as Riko Sakurauchi

=== Video games ===
- Hyperdevotion Noire: Goddess Black Heart (2014) as Poona (as Rikako Itō)
- Grimms Notes (2016) as Chaos Dunyazad
- Love Live! School Idol Festival (2016) as Riko Sakurauchi
- Girls' Frontline (2016) as HK CAWS and EM-2
- Love Live! School Idol Festival All-Stars (2019) as Riko Sakurauchi
- SD Gundam G Generation Cross Rays (2019) as Chall Acustica (young) and Custom character option voice
- Magia Record as Maria Yuki
- Atelier Ryza 2: Lost Legends & the Secret Fairy (2020) as Zephine Baudouin
- Arknights (2020) as Quartz
- Goonya Monster (2022) as Snail
- Yohane the Parhelion: Blaze in the Deepblue (2023) as Riko
- That Time I Got Reincarnated as a Slime: ISEKAI Chronicles (2024) as Sumire Makino
- The Hundred Line: Last Defense Academy (2025) as Kako Tsukumo

=== Stage ===
- Kageki Shojo!! (2024) as Momo Kozono

=== Dubbing roles ===
==== Live-action ====
- Dungeons & Dragons: Honor Among Thieves as Kira (Chloe Coleman)
- Gossip Girl as Zoya Lott (Whitney Peak)
- House of the Dragon as Laena Velaryon (Nanna Blondell)
- Jappeloup (2021 BS TV Tokyo edition) as Raphaëlle Dalio (Lou de Laâge)
- Jesus Revolution as Cathe (Anna Grace Barlow)
- Killing Eve as Villanelle (Jodie Comer)
- Knock at the Cabin as Adriane (Abby Quinn)
- Pacific Rim: Uprising as Mei Lin (Lily Ji)
- Scream as Tara Carpenter (Jenna Ortega)
- Scream VI as Tara Carpenter (Jenna Ortega)

==== Animation ====
- The Angry Birds Movie 2 as Ella

== Discography ==
=== Studio albums ===
Legend:	Mini-album

Year	Album details	Catalog no.	Oricon chart
2019	Principal: Released: 19 June 2019	AZZS-88	4
2020	Curtain Raise: Released: 31 March 2020	AZCS-1089	6
2021	Fiction: Released: 24 February 2021	AZCS-1097	14

=== Singles ===
Year	Song	Album
2019	"Ordinary Love": Senryu Girl ending; Released: 5 April 2019; Format: Digital download	Curtain raise
2019	"For...": Val × Love opening; Released: 13 November 2019	Curtain raise
2020	"Blue Hour" (ブルーアワー): Released: 7 August 2020; Format: Digital download	Non-album single
