= Nanaka Suwa =

Japanese voice actress (born 1994)

- 諏訪 ななか
- Born: November 2, 1994 (age 32); Kawagoe, Saitama, Japan
- Occupations: Voice actress; singer
- Years active: 2013–present
- Agent: Stay Luck
- Notable work: Love Live! Sunshine!! as Kanan Matsuura
- Height: 158 cm (5 ft 2 in)
- Musical career
- Genres: J-Pop; Anison
- Instrument: Vocals
- Years active: 2020–present
- Label: Nippon Columbia
- Website: columbia.jp/suwananaka/

Nanaka Suwa (諏訪 ななか, Suwa Nanaka; born November 2, 1994) is a Japanese voice actress and singer from Kawagoe, Saitama. She is known for her role as Kanan Matsuura from Love Live! Sunshine!!.

== Biography ==
Suwa was inspired to become a voice actress after watching the anime Hidamari Sketch. She later debuted as a voice actress in 2013. She hosted an internet radio program on A&G+ as a unit called "Urumeitsu Junior." On April 8, 2015, she officially joined the talent office Amuleto.

In the same year, she joined the multimedia franchise Love Live! Sunshine!! as Kanan Matsuura and became a member of Aqours. The character is her first role as a main character, and during the audition, she already aimed to become Kanan's voice actress. She is nicknamed "Suwawa" by both fans and Aqours members.

In 2017, Suwa's agency Amuleto prohibited the reproducing of her photos from various official sources. This is most likely to prevent any more impostor incidents, which she had mentioned a few days before.

On March 31, 2021, Suwa announced that she would be leaving Amuleto.

== Works ==
=== Anime ===
- World War Blue (2013) as Yaya
- Typhoon Noruda (2015) as Otenba
- Love Live! Sunshine!! (2016–2017) as Kanan Matsuura
- Sabapara (2016) as Miyo
- PJ Berry no Mogumogu Munyamunya (2016) as Sunny Funny
- Gabriel DropOut (2017) as customer
- Bofuri (2020) as Yui
- Management of a Novice Alchemist (2022) as Kate Starven
- Yohane the Parhelion: Sunshine in the Mirror (2023) as Kanan
- The Too-Perfect Saint: Tossed Aside by My Fiancé and Sold to Another Kingdom (2025) as Jane Matilas

=== Anime films ===
- Idol Bu Show (2022) as Risa Umino

=== Video games ===
- Love Live! School Idol Festival as Kanan Matsuura
- Love Live! School Idol Festival All Stars as Kanan Matsuura
- Epic Seven as Free Spirit Tieria, Helga, Azalea
- Relayer as Eight
- Yohane the Parhelion: Blaze in the Deepblue as Kanan

== Discography ==
=== Studio albums ===
Legend:	Mini-album

Title	Album details	Catalog no.		Oricon	
Title	Album details	Regular edition	Limited edition	Peak position	Weeks charted
So Sweet Dolce	Released: 13 May 2020; Label: Nippon Columbia	COCX-41109	COZX-1643/4 (First-run Limited Edition A); COZX-1645/6 (First-run Limited Edition B)	6	4
Color Me Purple	Released: 4 November 2020; Label: Nippon Columbia	COZX-1685/6 (CD + Blu-ray); SACX-1068/9 (Purple Edition)		19	3
