= Arisa Komiya =

Japanese actress

- 小宮 有紗
- Born: February 5, 1994 (age 32); Shimotsuke, Tochigi, Japan
- Occupations: Actress; Dancer; Voice actress
- Years active: 2010–present
- Notable work: Tokumei Sentai Go-Busters as Yoko Usami/Yellow Buster; Shiromajo Gakuen as Anzu Mikumo; Love Live! Sunshine!! as Dia Kurosawa
- Height: 165 cm (5 ft 5 in)
- Website: komiya-arisa.net

Arisa Komiya (小宮 有紗, Komiya Arisa; born February 5, 1994) is a Japanese actress and voice actress from Shimotsuke, Tochigi. Komiya is known for starring as Yoko Usami/Yellow Buster in the 2012 Super Sentai series Tokumei Sentai Go-Busters and Dia Kurosawa in the multimedia project Love Live! Sunshine!!. She was previously affiliated with Box Corporation until 2025.

== Filmography ==
=== Television ===
Year	Title	Role	Other notes
2012	Tokumei Sentai Go-Busters	Yoko Usami/Yellow Buster	Main role
2013	Mizuki Shigeru's Gegege Ghost Story	Keiko Wakasugi (actor)	
2013	Heaven's Love	Itsuki Nagasawa (young Itsuki Hanyu) (actor)	
2016	Kamen Rider Ghost	Yuki Shirai/Harry Houdini (actor) (Ep. 29-30)/Gammiser Liquid (voice) (Ep. 46)	Ep. 29 - 30, 46
2017	Uchu Sentai Kyuranger	Akyanba (voice) (Eps. 25-26, 28 - 35)/Akyachuuga (co-voiced with : Naoya Uchida and Hiroshi Tsuchida) (Ep. 42)	Eps. 25 - 26, 28 - 35, 42
2019	Back Street Girls: Gokudols	Yui Nakamura	Television version only
2020	Kamen Rider Zero-One	Chiharu Ebii	Ep. 21 - 24

=== Film ===
Year	Title	Role	Other notes
2011	Ring of Curse	Yoko Fujita	
2011	High School Debut		
2012	Kaizoku Sentai Gokaiger vs. Space Sheriff Gavan: The Movie	Yellow Buster	Voice role, cameo
2012	Kamen Rider × Super Sentai: Super Hero Taisen	Yoko Usami/Yellow Buster	
2012	Tokumei Sentai Go-Busters the Movie: Protect the Tokyo Enetower!	Yoko Usami/Yellow Buster	
2013	Tokumei Sentai Go-Busters vs. Kaizoku Sentai Gokaiger: The Movie	Yoko Usami/Yellow Buster	
2013	Kamen Rider × Super Sentai × Space Sheriff: Super Hero Taisen Z	Yoko Usami/Yellow Buster	
2013	Innocent Lilies	Anzu Mikumo	
2014	Zyuden Sentai Kyoryuger vs. Go-Busters: The Great Dinosaur Battle! Farewell Our Eternal Friends	Yoko Usami/Yellow Buster	
2015	KIRI: The Chronicles Of A Professional Killer	Megumi	
2015	Ultraman Ginga S The Movie	Arina	
2015	Yumeji: Ai no tobashiri	Hikono	
2016	Evergreen Love		
2016	Mars: Tada, Kimi wo Aishiteru		
2017	Shinjuku Swan II		
2018	50 First Kisses		
2018	Out and Out	Rie Kitagawa	
2019	Toshimaen	Yuka Kobayashi	
2019	All of Them are Troublesome Girls	Kazumi Kazumiya	
2020	13gatsu no Onnanoko	Kazuho Anamori	
2022	Shikkokuten	Kita	

=== Stage ===
Year	Title	Role
2011	Girls Prison Opera	Kaoru Koshiba
2013	Robotics;Notes	Akiho Senomiya
2014	Phantasy Star Online 2 -On Stage-	Alice

=== Original DVD ===
Year	Title	Role
2012	Tokumei Sentai Go-Busters VS Beet Buster VS J	Yoko Usami
2012	Summer Dream	herself
2013	Returns! Tokumei Sentai Go-Busters VS Dobutsu Sentai Go-Busters	Yoko Usami/Yellow Buster/Yellow Rabbit
2013	Nineteen	herself

=== Animation ===
Year	Title	Role
2016	Garo: Divine Flame	Sara
2016-2017	Love Live! Sunshine!!	Dia Kurosawa
2018	Star Blazers: Space Battleship Yamato 2202	Urara Kusakabe
2019	Love Live! Sunshine!! The School Idol Movie: Over the Rainbow	Dia Kurosawa
2020	D4DJ First Mix	Mana Kase
2022	Miss Kuroitsu from the Monster Development Department	Koharu Hōen
2022	The Tunnel to Summer, the Exit of Goodbyes	Koharu Kawasaki
2023	Yohane the Parhelion: Sunshine in the Mirror	Dia
2025	The Red Ranger Becomes an Adventurer in Another World	Tsukasa Aizawa/Kizuna Pink

=== Video games ===
- Yohane the Parhelion: Blaze in the Deepblue (2023), Dia

=== Dubbing ===
- Famous in Love, Paige Townsen (Bella Thorne)

== Photobooks ==
- Summer Diary (夏日記) (2012)
- Arisa (有紗) (2013)
- Majestic (2018)
- IO (2020)
