= Rilu Rilu Fairilu =

Japanese character franchise

- Rilu Rilu Fairilu: Yōsei no Door anime key visual

リルリルフェアリル (Riru Riru Feariru)
- Anime television series

Rilu Rilu Fairilu: Yōsei no Door
- Directed by: Sakura Gojo
- Written by: Aya Matsui
- Music by: Kiichi Tsurusaki; Ryūichi Iwasaki; Ken Ikesaki
- Studio: Studio Deen
- Original network: TXN (TV Tokyo, TV Osaka), AT-X
- English network: HK: TVB
- Original run: February 6, 2016 – March 25, 2017
- Episodes: 59
- Anime television series

Rilu Rilu Fairilu: Mahō no Kagami
- Directed by: Nana Imanaka; Sakura Gojo
- Written by: Akemi Omode
- Music by: Kiichi Tsurusaki; Ryūichi Iwasaki
- Studio: Studio Deen
- Original network: TXN (TV Tokyo, TV Osaka), AT-X
- English network: HK: TVB
- Original run: April 7, 2017 – March 30, 2018
- Episodes: 51
- Anime television series

Oshiete Mahō no Pendulum: Rilu Rilu Fairilu
- Directed by: Chisei Maeda
- Written by: Akemi Omode
- Music by: Yuuyu; Shun Daimon
- Studio: Studio Deen
- Original network: Kids Station, Animax, Tokyo MX
- English network: HK: TVB
- Original run: July 7, 2018 – January 5, 2019
- Episodes: 26

Rilu Rilu Fairilu (Japanese: リルリルフェアリル, Hepburn: Riru Riru Feariru) is a character franchise created in collaboration by Sanrio and Sega Sammy Holdings, illustrated by character designer Ai Setani (Kirimichan). It is the second Sanrio franchise that was handled by two companies, the first being Jewelpet. The franchise was officially launched in December 2015.

The series has received three anime adaptions by Studio Deen, titled Rilu Rilu Fairilu: Yōsei no Door, Rilu Rilu Fairilu: Mahō no Kagami, and Oshiete Mahō no Pendulum: Rilu Rilu Fairilu.

== Plot ==
In a magical world of Little Fairilu, there are small magical fairies representing flowers, insects, and other entities named Fairilu, who are all born from the Fairilu Seed. Each Fairilu is born with their own key, the Fairilu Key, that can open magical doors, casting magic spells. If the Fairilu finds the right door, they can finally grow into a full-fledged fairy. The doors also link to the human world. While meeting new friends, Fairilus must study and go to school to learn about the world in which they live.

The series focuses on a Flower Fairilu named Lip, and her friends in Little Fairlu. The series follows Lip's overall life in Little Fairilu while making new friends and learning from everything around her, growing up day after day. It also tells about the Fairilu friends' adventures in the human world, where they can meet their human partners who support their dreams and are willing to help each other fulfill them.

The third season focuses on a human girl called Arisu Hanazono, who discovers a magical pendulum and book one day, summoning Fairilus. Arisu initially had many worries, but by meeting the friendly Fairilus and traveling into their homeworld, Little Fairilu, she gets a chance to solve her problems and change herself.

== Characters ==
=== Flower Fairilu ===
- Lip (りっぷ, Rippu) (Voiced by: Yumiri Hanamori) is a pink tulip Fairilu who cries easily, but has a kind heart and does not give up. When Lip was about to be born from her Fairilu Seed, she could not open the Door of Birth, but was encouraged by Nozomu. Lip eventually was born into the world and always thinks of him. In season 3, she acts like Spica's younger sister. Lip is also in love with Drop, Nozomu's Fairilu form and not the same person from previous two seasons. Her Fairilu Magic is "Puru Puru Lip Puru.".
- Himawari (ひまわり) (Voiced by: Aya Uchida): As her name implies, Himawari is a sunflower Fairilu. She is an innocent and cheerful fairy who is good at dancing as well as being popular with everyone. Her pet is Shippo. Her Fairilu Magic is "Hima Hima Himawari.".
- Sumire (すみれ) (Voiced by: Rina Hidaka) is a violet Fairilu. She is good at painting and likes beautiful things that bring a little happiness. She is extremely sensitive. Her dream is to be a fashion designer. Her Fairilu Magic is "Sumi Sumi Sumire.".
- Rose (ローズ, Rōzu) (Voiced by: Aina Kusuda) is a red rose Fairilu. She is hard-working, yet prideful and a little clumsy. Initially, Rose saw Lip as her rival and wanted to be alone, but with Lip's effort, she gradually gets along with other Fairilu. In season 3, she is good at hair styling and cosmetic blending. She is also in love with Juli (Yuuto's Fairilu form, but not the same person from season 1 & 2). Her Fairilu Magic is "Chiku Chiku Rose.".
- Rin (りん) (Voiced by: Satomi Satō) is a carefree gentian Fairilu. She was born one year later than the other Fairilus of Lip's generation. Her Fairilu Seed was accidentally sent to the human world, as well as being picked up and kept by Karen. Before Rin was born, she constantly encouraged Karen who was in a hospital. Rin finally was born into the world with Karen's encouragement, and becomes friends with other Fairilu. In season 3, she likes making perfumes, hoping to create perfumes that can support other people's feelings. Her Fairilu Magic is "Suya Suya Rin Rin"
- Olive (オリーブ, Orību) (Voiced by: Atsushi Abe is an olive Fairilu. He is kind and helpful, and is also quite smart and sensible, which might be why he is popular with Fairilu girls. He likes cheering on people and help them. He enjoys helping Fairilu Gole the most because he wants to do something for Little Fairilu and help Fairilu Gole to protect the world. His Fairilu Magic is "Oli Oli Olive.".
- Dante (ダンテ) (Voiced by: Megumi Toyoguchi) is a dandelion Fairilu. He is good at sports and likes to compete with Himawari in sports. He treats Himawari as a rival, but he also loves her. They sometimes fight each other, too. But later they apologize to each other. He wants to be a unicorn racing jockey in the future. His Fairilu Magic is "Dan Dan Dante.".
- Suzu (すず) and Ran (らん) (Voiced by: Rina Hidaka) are a pair of lily of the valley Fairilu twins. They are different writers, Suzu is drawing comics (manga comics) and Ran is writing stories.
- Ajisai (あじさい) (Voiced by: Misaki Kuno) is a lavender hydrangea Fairilu. She's a strong, laid-back and kind girl. She loves rainy days, and when she cries, tears come out like rain. She is good at making Japanese sweets. She and Amemi working together every year to color the hydrangea flowers that bloom in the Little Fairy when they are come in the rainy days. Her Fairilu Magic is "Aji Aji Ajisai.".
- Sakura (さくら) (Voiced by: Hitomi Ōwada) is a cherry blossom Fairilu. She is introverted and timid girl who has an old fashioned taste she usually say sentences in an old fashioned way. She is also Star's fan. Her Fairilu Magic is "Bloom Bloom Sakura.".
- Higan (ひがん) (Voiced by: Yusuke Shirai) is a red spider lily Fairilu. He is usually a quite and studious Fairilu. He likes to spend time by himself and can be seen in the library. He also likes to conduct experiments. He likes to be in dark places. He also has a sense of dark magic and knows that Spider uses it. Higan becomes good friends with Olive and wishes to hang out with him more often.
- Kasumi (かすみ) (Voiced by: Yuto Suzuki) is a baby's breath Fairilu. Kasumi is quiet and regarded as odd by some Fairilus, but his inner world is very gentle and rich in emotions.Kasumi also composed songs for Yumiri Hanasaki's live performance. He and Sumire have crushes on each other.
- Azami (アザミ) (Voiced by: Yuka Nishigaki) is a thistle Fairilu. Azami is a bit of a mischievous boy, but he greatly respects Rose. He calls her "boss" After being scolded by Rose. He aspires to be a chef, and his cooking skills and skill in serving dishes are outstanding. He is serious enough to ice his room for Rose and practice making ice sculptures.
- Dahlia (ダリア, Daria) (Voiced by: Saki Ogasawara) is a pink dahlia Fairilu. She has a bright personality. She is wearing dark make-up, and she is getting furious when her face was posted on the Beniyako Newspaper without permission. Her Fairilu Magic is "Dali Dali Dahlia"
- Jasmine (ジャスミン, Jasumin) (Voiced by: Miho Wataya) is a jasmine Fairilu. She has a dog named Popo. She is aiming to become a trimmer in the future. She seems to be in love with Mr. hopper at first sight. Her Fairilu Magic is "Jas Jas Jasmine.".
- Gerbera (ガーベラ, Gābera) (Voiced by: Satomi Satō) is a yellow gerbera Fairilu. She is a graduate of the Magical Fairy School and she is in big human with the wind.
- Margaret (マーガレット, Māgaretto) is a marguerite Fairilu. She appears only in Rilu Rilu Fairilu's Secret Encyclopedia.

=== Mermaid Fairilu ===
Akoya (あこや)
Voiced by: Megumi Toyoguchi
A mermaid Fairilu, with her name coming from the Akoya pearl. She aspires to be a model and loves yoga. She doesn't neglect her daily efforts to become beautiful. She participated in the fashion show of Human in the 1st episode of episode 43, and met Kaido there. However, she was disgusted by her failure and made a weak sound, but she was encouraged by Ruko and strengthened his desire to become a model. Her Fairilu Magic is "Ako Ako Akoya.".
Sango (サンゴ)
Voiced by: Chiaki Shimogama
A mermaid Fairilu, with her name coming from coral. She loves eating chips and snacks, causing her to get fat sometimes, but she can return to her normal self again quickly.
Wakame (わかめ)
Voiced by: Hitomi Ōwada
A mermaid Fairilu, with her name coming from seaweed. Wakame does not like her name and wants to be called "Elizabeth" (エリザベス) instead by everyone. Her pet is a jellyfish.
Fish (フィッシュ, Fisshu)
Voiced by: Atsushi Abe
A merman Fairilu, with his name coming from fish. He loves girls and is always flirting with girls. However, it seems that when he falls in love, he becomes single-minded. His greeting is "Cheers!" He adores Akoya's partner Ruko, calling her "Big Sister Ruko."
Mesh (メッシュ, Messhu)
Voiced by: Yusuke Shirai
A merman Fairilu. As his name suggests, he has black hair with gold mesh. He greets with unusual words like "ciao" and calls girls "senorita". He's usually a joker and sometimes lies, but deep down he's an honest boy who cares about his friends. He calls Ruko, who is the same as Fish, "Big Sister Ruko."
Luca (ルカ)
Voiced by: Aina Kusuda
A mermaid Fairilu. She is a fashion leader who is always on the cutting edge of fashion with her flashy clothes. She wears her favorite hat (a conch shell hat). In episode 26 of season 1, on the way to Sea Candle Castle, when her hat gets caught in the Labyrinth Seaweed, she says, "If I take this hat off, I won't be myself," and "I can't neglect fashion no matter what." That's how particular she is about style. If asked which is more important, life or fashion, she would prioritize fashion.
Misty (ミスティ, Misuti)
Voiced by: Yuka Nishigaki
A mermaid Fairilu, with his name coming from mist. She is a shy fairilu who loves mysterious places such as mystery spots. Her catchphrase is "Mysterious!" She has a weakness for mysterious things, and even loves dangerous places such as "Labyrinth Seaweed" and "Fluorescent Sea Anemone Forest" from the Mystery Dictionary's "Do Not Go Series," saying "I have to go there." Her pet is a sea urchin named Unini.
Pen (ぺん)
Voiced by: Yuto Suzuki
A merman Fairilu. He always wears sunglasses because his eyes are weak, so there is a rumor that if you can see Pen's eyes, you will be happy.

=== Bugs Fairilu ===
Kabuto (カブト)
Voiced by: Yui Watanabe
A rhinoceros beetle Fairilu. He dreams to become a game developer and make a game that is popular in Little Fairilu with Kuwa.
Kuwa (クワ)
Voiced by: Yui Watanabe
A stag beetle Fairilu. He dreams to become a game programmer and make a game that is popular in Little Fairilu with Kabuto.
Akiakane (アキアカネ)
Voiced by: Aya Uchida
An autumn darter Fairilu. He has an active personality. He flies fast and has good motor nerves, but he often loses to Dante and Sunflower. While Dante recognizes Sunflower as a rival, he feels itchy that he is not recognized as a rival. He is aiming to be a unicorn jockey. He is grateful to Kirara for attending the Unicorn race special training every morning, he and Dante take her to the beach every week. Dante said, "The movement is hard." In the anime, it is drawn slightly smaller than other fairilus. According to the official introduction, it seems to be "quite popular", but there was no description of it in the anime. His Fairilu Magic is "Aki Aki Akiakane.".
Miruru (みるる)
Voiced by: Yui Watanabe
A honeybee Fairilu. She is kind and helping, but can sometimes refuse to enjoy herself and continue to work so that everything will go well.
Hotaru (ホタル)
Voiced by: Misaki Kuno
A firefly Fairilu. She has a complex to herself, that can only shine in the dark, and she has a looking for sunflowers that are bright and popular among everyone. However, when she was evaluated by Sunflower for one of his moving parties, she became confident in her personality. She mistook Pen for wanting to be a detective. She has been seen the eyes of the pen.
Shiro (シロ)
Voiced by: Atsushi Abe
A small cabbage white Fairilu. Shiro is a usually quiet Fairilu with a love for sweets. He also has a dislike for vegetables, but he once drank a vegetable juice and said it was delicious. He is a very good friend of Kamakiri and is usually seen with him. He has a habit of saying "fuwawa" at the end of his dialogues or as a random noise. His dream is to become a pâtisser.
Kamakiri (カマキリ)
Voiced by: Yusuke Shirai
A mantis Fairilu. He is taller than the other Fairilu. He is caring and looks up like an older brother to Shiro. He worries about Shiro, because he eating too much sweets. While everyone around him is working hard towards their dreams, he is the only one who hasn't decided on one, which worries him. Later, he becomes attracted to the profession of a doctor, but when he learns that he needs to go to Big Humalu and study a lot to make his dream come true, he thinks, "I can't do it." However, after taking care of Shiro and hearing the words Fairilu Gole say to him, he becomes more positive about becoming a doctor. After that, whether it's the result of his hard work or he was originally good at it, in episode 13 of season 2, it can be seen that he has ranked 5th in his test results. His Fairilu Magic is "Kama Kama Kamakiri.".
Spider (スパイダー, Supaidā)
Voiced by: Chiaki Shimogama
A spider Fairilu. She is devoted to black magic. She has a cool personality and doesn't like going out in the rain. She is usually busy researching black magic potions, but Lip and the others call her "Spider-chan's delicious sweets." She wants to become a black witch in the future, but she believes in never hurting people. According to Spider, black magic is an "aesthetic". Her Fairilu Magic is "Spa Spa Spider". When she is casting black magic, she reverses everything and chants "Uliriaf Ulir Ulir Nn-bu Bun Redips Aps Aps.".
Lady (レディ, Redi)
Voiced by: Saki Ogasawara
A ladybug Fairilu. She has a dream of becoming a beautician.
Shijimi (しじみ)
Voiced by: Tomoyo Kurosawa
A pale grass blue Fairilu. She is easily affectionate to other Fairilus, and would call them "sister". She also loves music, especially playing flute.
Goemon (ごえもん)
Voiced by: Toshiki Masuda
A cockroach Fairilu. He is the oldest brother of Kintarou, Bunta and Rina. The four of them form the Dorm cleaning group "Team G" (チームG Chīmu G). He is a cleaner in the dormitory of the Magical Fairy School.
Kintarō (きんたろう)
Voiced by: Yusuke Shirai
A cockroach Fairilu. He is the middle brother of Goemon, Bunta and Rina. He is a cleaner in the dormitory of the Magical Fairy School.
Bunta (ぶんた)
Voiced by: Aina Kusuda
A cockroach Fairilu. He is the youngest brother of Goemon, Kintarou and Rina. He is the second youngest member in "Team G" (チームG Chīmu G). He is a cleaner in the dormitory of the Magical Fairy School.
Rina (りな)
Voiced by: Tomoyo Kurosawa
A cockroach Fairilu. She is the only sister of Goemon, Kintarou and Bunta. She is the youngest member in "Team G" (チームG Chīmu G). She is a cleaner in the dormitory of the Magical Fairy School.
Ageha (アゲハ)
Voiced by: Yumiri Hanamori
A swallowtail butterfly Fairilu. She is one of Sui's subordinates. She works with Zemi and Kirigiri to capture Fairilu in Big Humalu, and also tries to steal the Magic Mirror. For some reason, she did not know about Little Fairilu. In episode 42 of season 2, she visits Little Fairilu for the first time with Zemi and Kirigiri. In the final episode, she, Zemi and Kirigiri have a change of heart, and set out on a journey with Sui to find the Fairilu Seeds that fell from Little Fairilu. In season 3, he appears with Zemi and Kirigiri in episodes 15 and 16. She is not one of Sui's subordinates, and plays pranks on Lip and the others out of curiosity.
Zemi (ゼミィ, Zemī)
Voiced by: Yusuke Shirai
A large brown cicada Fairilu. He ends her sentences with "zemi". He is one of Sui's subordinates. He is rich, but doesn't like to carry cash. Like Ageha, he didn't know about Little Fairilu.
Kirigiri (キリギリ)
Voiced by: Toshiki Masuda
A katydid Fairilu. He speaks with "giri" at the end of his sentences. He is one of Sui's subordinates. Apparently, his violin playing gives him headaches. Like Ageha and Zemi, he didn't know about the Little Fairilu.
Otama (おタマ)
Voiced by: Mamiko Noto
A jewel beetle Fairilu. She works as a psychological counselor. She can assume different emotions and personalities depending on the person she is talking to, so she can even listen to the boring stories of the Glasses Teacher.
Kaiko-chan (かいこちゃん)
Voiced by: Mamiko Noto
A silkmoth Fairilu. She makes clothes for Little Fairilu. She is said that wearing Kaiko's silk clothes will bring good luck, but everyone else wants silk clothes just to be lucky and doesn't understand the good qualities of silk, so she is screening out people who understand the quality of silk and how difficult it is to make it. Her catchphrase is "Silky!". It seems there is more to this "Silky!"

=== Mushroom Fairilu ===
Noko (のこ)
Voiced by: Aya Uchida
A mushroom Fairilu. She is a fashionable mushroom fairilu and the eldest sister of the Mash Sisters. The three sisters run a cafe together. When she gets angry, she becomes so strong that she can throw huge rocks. Her Fairilu Magic is "Noko Noko Nokko.".
Dot (ドット, Dotto)
Voiced by: Shirori Mizutani (S1)→Mamiko Noto (S2)→Rina Hidaka (S3)
A mushroom Fairilu. She is a fashionable mushroom fairilu and the middle sister of the Mash Sisters. Her hobby is reading. She works as a cook at the cafe. Her Fairilu Magic is "Dotto Do Dotto.".
Daké (ダケ, Dake)
Voiced by: Yui Watanabe
A mushroom Fairilu. A fashionable mushroom fairilu, she is the youngest sister of the Mash Sisters. She loves fashion. Her Fairilu Magic is "Dake Dake Daake.".
Benitengu (ベニテング)
Voiced by: Masahito Yabe
A fly agaric Fairilu. He always carries a notepad with him and writes down all kinds of rumors and scoops. His dream is to become a journalist, and he creates the Beniyako Newspaper together with Yakou.
Yakou (ヤコウ)
Voiced by: Yuto Suzuki
A Mycena chlorophos Fairilu. He has a quiet personality. He always carries a camera with him and loves taking pictures of beautiful nature. His dream is to become a photographer, and he works with Benitengu to create the Beniyako Newspaper.
Kinshi (きんし)
Voiced by: Atsushi Abe
A poisonous mushroom Fairilu, with his name comes from hypha. He loves to chat and is good at giving advice on people's problems. He can counselling everyone's problems, like predict predictions, to make everyone feel better. But when he made everyone to feel better, he wanted to feel better too, with the help of his magic, he filled several urns with his worries. When Houshi is cheered him, Kinshi was felt better for real, urns were opened and all of Kinshi's worries were went out. He uses feminine language.
Houshi (ほうし)
Voiced by: Yuto Suzuki
A poisonous mushroom Fairilu, with his name comes from spore. He is a helper and the best friend of Kinshi. Like Kinshi, he speaks in an effeminate manner and wears a skirt despite being a boy.
Nameko (なめこ)
Voiced by: Chitose Morinaga
A butterscotch mushroom Fairilu. She speaks in the "-dabe" style. She loves mushroom rabbits. She has a habit of worrying about time and getting impatient.

=== Veggie Fairilu ===
Carrot (キャロット, Kyarotto)
Voiced by: Hitomi Ōwada
A carrot Fairilu. She has a dream of running a juice bar with Tomato and sell delicious vegetable juice so that everyone can enjoy it. Her Fairilu Magic is "Caro Caro Carrot."
Tomato (とまと)
Voiced by: Misaki Kuno)
A tomato Fairilu. She has a dream of running a juice bar with Carrot and sell delicious vegetable juice so that everyone can enjoy it.
Arti (アーティ, Āti)
Voiced by: Toshiki Masuda
An artichoke Fairilu. He practices unicorn racing with Akiakane, Dante, and the unicorn Sarara. He speaks with a bit of English and ends her sentences with "-desu". Because he wears glasses, he is the only veggie fairy who can stop Tama-chan from crying. He gets angry when people call him "asparagus".
Corn (コーン, Kōn)
Voiced by: Tomoyo Kurosawa
A baby corn Fairilu. She has a distinctive double tooth. She makes fun of Carrot, Danshaku, and Tama-chan for being brown and boring, but they are usually very close friends.
Cabbage (キャベツ, Kyabetsu)
Voiced by: Yuka Nishigaki
A cabbage Fairilu. Although she finds Carrot and the others somewhat dull, they usually get along very well. Saving money is more than just a hobby; it's her life, and she gets angry if people waste money. She ends her sentences with "~nya" and her catchphrase is "I'll save money ~nya." In the third season, it is revealed that she likes unicorns.
Peas (ぴぃす, Pīsu)
Voiced by: Aya Uchida
A green peas Fairilu. She always holds her pet "Omame" in her arms. Her dream is to become a teacher.
Danshaku (だんしゃく)
Voiced by: Toshiki Masuda
An Irish Cobbler Fairilu. He is good at magic and performs magic tricks with Sabobon. He doesn't mind being called "embarrassing".
Tama-chan (タマちゃん)
Voiced by: Yusuke Shirai
An onion Fairilu. He is usually very calm, but he is very emotional fairilu of all Veggie Fairilus. When he cries, from himself, he lets an orange and brown dust (and anyone who smells or is exposed to the onion stench that is released at that time), which is making everyone's eyes teary and cry to everyone, even if they are not sad, just like chopped onion.
Broco (ブロコ, Buroko)
Voiced by: Kei Minegishi
A broccoli Fairilu. He dreams of becoming comedians with Caulico. His signature gag is "Broccoli, Sho Broccoli."
Caulico (カリコ, Kariko)
Voiced by: Yusuke Shirai
A cauliflower Fairilu. He dreams of becoming comedians with Broco. His signature gag is, "Kari Kari Suru Wa ̄ ! Cauliflower!"
Celery (セロリ, Serori)
Voiced by: Yuto Suzuki
A celery Fairilu. He is very good at skating and wants to skate in pairs, but because of his harsh personality, no one of the Veggie Fairilus wants to pair up with him. As a result, he ends up skating with Noumu. His Fairilu Magic is "Sero Sero Serori.".

=== Weather Fairilu ===
Sun (サン, San)
Voiced by: Toru Sakurai
A sun Fairilu. He is a bright, positive, sunny boy. When Sun smiles, the sun shines. He is the drummer in Star's band. His Fairilu Magic is "Sun Sun Shine.".
Amemi (あめみ)
Voiced by: Chiaki Shimogama
A rain Fairilu. Every year, when it's rainy day, she and Ajisai are in charge of coloring the hydrangea flowers that bloom at Little Fairilu. She has an impatient personality and likes to finish everything early, so she didn't get along with Ajisai at first, but after they made up, they became good friends. She's a little strong-willed. Her glasses are her charm point. She always carries an umbrella, and when she opens it, it's supposed to rain (however, this was not depicted in the anime). In episode 43 of the second season, she paired up with Kumomo in a skiing and jumping. Her Fairilu Magic is "Ame Ame Amemi.".
Thunder (サンダー, Sandā)
Voiced by: Yuto Suzuki
A Lightning Fairilu. When Thunder plays his guitar, thunder occurs. He often gets complaints about the thunder. He's noisy, but he's a good kid at heart. He plays guitar in Star's band.
Aurora (オーロラ, Ōrora)
Voiced by: Tomoyo Kurosawa
A northern lights Fairilu. She is sensitive to the cold and always wears thick clothes. Aurora likes to make curtains out of cloth in her spare time.
Kumomo (くもも)
Voiced by: Atsushi Abe
A cloud Fairilu. He plays the keyboard in Star's band. In episode 43 of season 2, he pairs up with Amemi in skiing and jumping.
Rainbow (レインボー, Reinbō)
Voiced by: Rina Hidaka
A rainbow Fairilu. She is good at singing. When she smiles, rainbows appear. She has many fluffy dogs, and in the Friendship Festival in episode 20 of season 1, she had them jump through hoops.
Star (スター, Sutā)
Voiced by: Toshiki Masuda
A star Fairilu. He is a popular idol of Little Fairilu. His Fairilu Magic is "Kira Kira Star.".
Oyuki (おゆき)
Voiced by: Yuka Nishigaki
A snow Fairilu. She is always blowing gum. She can make glass crafts from snow. She once created glass art: Snow (スノウ Sunou) - Fairilu-like glass art made of snow. Her Fairilu Magic is "Yuki Yuki Oyuki.".
Noumu (ノーム, Nōmu)
Voiced by: Megumi Toyoguchi
A dense fog Fairilu. A chuunibyou character. When she is depressed, fog appears around him. In episode 48, he pairs up with Celery to skate.
Wind (ウィンド, U~indo)
Voiced by: Aina Kusuda
A wind Fairilu. She is a graduate of Magical Fairilu School. She is in Big Humalu with Gerbera. Her first appearance was in an avatar game for the tablet toy "Fairilu Pad."

=== Ikemenjo Fairilu ===
Tora (トラ)
Voiced by: Miho Wataya
A titan arum Fairilu. She is good at singing and hopes to make her debut as an idol together with Rafflé.
Rafflé (ラフレ, Rafure)
Voiced by: Megumi Toyoguchi, Ryoko Yuzuki (in Episodes 37-47)
A rafflesia Fairilu. She is Tora's best friend. She practices singing and dancing with Tora with the aim of making her debut as an idol. Her catchphrase is "~ndo wa."
Haetori (ハエトリー, Haetorī)
Voiced by: Masahito Yabe
A venus flytrap Fairilu. He is a lazy boy who doesn't want to do anything. Both he and Ojigisou have pet mandrakes that together they entered with in the Pet Friendship Festival.
Ojigisō (おじぎそう)
Voiced by: Natsuki Hanae
A sensative plant Fairilu. He is good at bowing. He always wears a loincloth. Like her original self, he is good at bowing and apologizing. Both he and Haetori have pet mandrakes who together they entered with in the Pet Friendship Festival.
Sabobon (サボボン)
Voiced by: Toru Sakurai
A cactus Fairilu. Because the thorns hurt, people don't go near it. Sometimes flowers bloom from its body. It's good at magic, and teaches it to Danshaku and performs magic tricks with him.
Utsubon (ウツボン)
Voiced by: Saki Ogasawara
A pitcher plant Fairilu. He is a scaredy, crybaby and tantrum. Always hiding in his burrow.
Durian (ドリアン, Dorian)
Voiced by: Misaki Kuno
A durian Fairilu. Tora and Rafflé's best friend. As a gourmet, she traveled all over the country to study cooking, so she didn't attend Fairilu School at first. She was inspired to become a gourmet after eating a dish that Tora, Rafflé, and Durian all remember fondly: roasted carnivorous plant, and finding it so disgusting.

=== Twinkle Fairilu ===
Spica (スピカ, Supika)
Voiced by: Ari Ozawa
A Spica star Fairilu who became one of the main characters in season 3, Spica acts like Lip's elder sister. Her Fairilu Magic is "Pika Pika Spica.".
Vega (ベガ, Bega)
Voiced by: Rina Hidaka
A Vega star Fairilu. She is good friends with Spica. In the novel "Spica and the Mysterious Kitten", she wears glasses.
Sirius (シリウス, Siriusu)
Voiced by: Kazuyuki Okitsu
A Sirius star Fairilu. He is an honor student and a leader among Spica and the others.
Procyon (プロキオン, Purokion)
Voiced by: Tsubasa Yonaga
A Procyon star Fairilu. Although they often fight with Spica, they are good friends.

=== Fruits Fairilu ===
Ringo (りんご)
Voiced by: Satomi Satō
An apple Fairilu. She forms a group with Lemon and Momo called "Fruits Paradise" and works as an idol in Big Humalu. She secretly has a crush on Strawberry. Her idol magic is "A shining earth and a tight smile! Her special move is apple cider!"
Momo (モモ)
Voiced by: Aya Uchida
A peach Fairilu. A member of "Fruits Paradise." Her idol magic is "A tight hug for you! A tight hug for those who need a hug! Her special move is the Peach Flush!"
Lemon (レモン, Remon)
Voiced by: Rina Hidaka
A lemon Fairilu. A member of "Fruits Paradise." Her idol magic is "Do you know the taste of first love? It's tightly packed, sweet and sour! My specialty is lemon lemon!" In fact, she is dating Sweetie.
Blueberry (ブルーベリー, Burūberī)
Voiced by: Aina Kusuda
A blueberry Fairilu. He is the manager of "Fantastic Juice." He always values time, and even when he is off and back at Little Fairilu, he manages the schedule by advising, "Idols need to be punctual and never be late." He says that without Blueberry's schedule management, Fantastic Juice would have fallen apart. When Hanasaki Yumiri becomes an idol strong enough to rival Fruits Paradise, he plans to headhunt her to Fantastic Juice. In season 3, he helped Rin with her magical perfume experiment. His catchphrase is "~berry"
Strawberry (ストロベリー, Sutoroberī)
Voiced by: Toshiki Masuda
A strawberry Fairilu. He and Sweetie form a group called "The Woostars." According to Sweetie, he has bad fashion sense. He also dreams of love, and searches for Lovedokari simply because she wants a boyfriend, and her feelings are so serious that even Sweetie has given up teasing her. In fact, Ringo is in love with Strawberry, but she is unaware of it.
Pine (パイン, Pain)
Voiced by: Yūsuke Kobayashi
A pineapple Fairilu. He loves Zakuro and has confessed his feelings to her a thousand times. But whether or not, Zakuro has received them is another matter.
Zakuro (ザクロ)
Voiced by: Yumiri Hanamori
A pomegranate Fairilu. She uses the first person pronoun "ore". She is always thinking about the Demon World, as seen in comments such as "I am borrowing the power of the Demon World", "The bright red pomegranate came from the Demon World", and when Pine brought him a gift he said "It's like a gift from the Demon World to me!". She is calm, but has a chuunibyou temperament. Pine likes her, but he is completely unaware of this.
Sweetie (スウィーティー, Suwītī)
Voiced by: Yusuke Shirai
An oroblanco Fairilu. A member of the "Wooden Stars." Strawberry calls him "pretentious", but Sakku and Rambo admire him and say he's "cool!". He confessed his feelings to Lemon and they are dating, but in Big Humalu he keeps it a secret because the gossip magazines are too noisy, but he doesn't hide things from his partner, so he told Strawberry when he fell in love and when his confession was successful. His idol magic is "If you think I'm being sweet, you'll get hurt."
Sakku (さっくー, Sakkū) and Ranbo (らんぼー, Ranbō)
Voiced by: Mamiko Noto
A pair of cherry Fairilu twins. If they say the same thing at the same time, they'll end up fighting, with Sweetie screaming, "Don't imitate me!" They both admire Sweetie. They form an idol group named "Cherries"

=== Legend Fairilu ===
- Fairilu Gole (フェアリルゴール, Fearīru Gōru) (Voiced by: Yusuke Shirai) is the person who watches Fairilus. Originally named Ren, he is a water lily Fairilu. In season 3, Fairilu Gole appears in his child form as Ren and is a friend of all Fairilu.
- Fairilu Marge (フェアリルマージ, Feariru Māji) (Voiced by: Megumi Toyoguchi) is the headmistress of Saint Fairilu School. Originally named Sonia, she is a sandersonia Fairilu. Her Fairilu Magic is "Fairilu Marje".
- Kirara (きらら) and Yurara (ゆらら) (Voiced by: Saki Ogasawara and Yui Watanabe) are a pair of unicorn Fairilu twins. Kirara's Fairilu Magic is "Kirara." and Yurara's Fairilu Magic is "Yurara.".
- Powawa (ぽわわ) (Voiced by: Misaki Kuno) is Lip's pet dog. His favorite food is marshmallows. He also has a strong side, making sure Lip has a marshmallow to eat when he overslept and couldn't prepare his lunch.
- Powalisa (ポワリザ, Powariza) (Voiced by: Shirori Mizutani (S1)→Mamiko Noto (S2)) is Rose' pet dog. According to Rose, her correct name is "Powalisa Kara Albania Sylphid III". Her body is pink and she wears a ribbon decorated with roses.
- Teacher Bokkuri (ぼっくり先生, Bokkuri-sensei) (Voiced by: Masahito Yabe) is a pinecone Fairilu. Although he is a small fairy, he has very strong magical powers. He is enthusiastic about education and can be very scary if he gets angry. He is a loving husband and cares very much for his wife Omatsu-san. However, he hides from Omatsu-san and eats Big Humal sweets while secretly looking at the pine cone page of the plant encyclopedia (a photo book for humans). When Omatsu-san finds out, he gets a severe scolding from her. He worries about students who don't come to school, tries to help students who are troubled, and when Don and Kuri come to get revenge, he sees them trying to appease the students and claims that the students have nothing to do with it, showing that he is a teacher who cares about his students. His catchphrase is "~Bokkuri". His Fairilu Magic is "Boku Boku Bokkuri".
- Omatsu-san (おまつさん) (Voiced by: Miho Wataya is a pinecone Fairilu who is Bokkuri's wife. At Saint Fairilu School, she is in charge of home economics and cooking in the cafeteria. Although she generally has a kind personality, she can have a scary side when angry. Her catchphrase is "~Deomatsu". Her Fairilu Magic is "Matsu Matsu Omatsu".
- Teacher Kingyo (きんぎょ先生, Kingyo-sensei) (Voiced by: Saki Ogasawara) is a goldfish Fairilu. Ms. Kingyo once had a forbidden love. As a punishment, she was turned into her current form, so she is actually older than she looks. She is in charge of love studies. Her Fairilu Magic is "Gyo Gyo Kingyo."
- Teacher Leon (レオン先生, Reon-sensei) (Voiced by: Atsushi Abe) is a chameleon Fairilu. He is in charge of transformation studies. He looks like a woman wearing heavy makeup, but no one knows his true identity. In addition to being able to become invisible, he can freely transform into various forms regardless of gender and body type, and has taken on the appearance of women in various costumes (high school girl, stewardess, Takarazuka-style) as well as a musician-style man thanks to knowledge he seems to have gained in the human world. When he gets angry or loses his cool, his voice becomes a man's. He gives advice on body modification, fashion, and makeup to the handsome boys of Jofearil who are worried about how to become popular. He is extremely tone-deaf, to the point that he was disqualified in the second season.
- Madame Neko (ネコ夫人, Neko Fujin) (Voiced by: Aina Kusuda) is a British Shorthair Fairilu. Due to her heavy body, she can't fly using wings, so she moves around on a magical cushion. MShe is married. She loves books and reads manga at the Legend Fairilu exclusive library. Also, among the forbidden books at the Magical Fairilu School is the Story of the Black Witch written by Mrs. Cat, which is currently sealed away with powerful magic. Her catchphrase is "~Nyamasu".

=== Humans ===
Nozomu Hanamura (花村 望, Hanamura Nozomu)
Voiced by: Natsuki Hanae
Nozomu is the main human protagonist of the series' first two seasons. He is a kind and gentle 12-year-old (13 in season 2) middle school student who is searching for the Fairilu's existence after his grandmother gave him a picture book about them. Apart from the first episode, Nozomu never had any direct contact with them until episode 55, when he finally meets Lip again. In season 3, Nozomu appears as a Fairilu named Drop who is in love with Lip like his human self.
Karen Hanamura (花村 かれん, Hanamura Karen)
Voiced by: Mamiko Noto
Karen is Nozomu's younger sister who debuts in and becomes the human protagonist of season 2. Karen was in a hospital of a foreign country when she discovered Rin's Fairilu Seed, which seemed to give her encouragement, and she cherished it. Later in Little Fairilu, where Rin's seed was brought back in order to let her be born into the world, Karen encouraged Rin to open the Door of Birth, which Rin finally succeeded.
Arisu Hanazono (花園 ありす, Hanazono Arisu)
Voiced by: Emiri Iwai
The main human protagonist of season 3, Arisu is a middle school student who is always worried. Being a transfer student and not good at talking with other people, she cannot make friends easily. One day, Arisu discovered Magical Pendulum and a magic book in a grocery store, which made her went to Little Fairilu with Lip and Spica after meeting them.

== Media ==
=== Merchandise ===
The franchise was first announced in Press Conference on December 11, 2015, as the second collaboration work between Sanrio and Sega Sammy Holdings, meant for the younger female demographic. It was revealed also that the series will have themes relating to flowers and keys, as well as mermaids and insects with characters officially based on the said themes. Merchandise of the series is officially planned, including stationery, toys, raincoats, clothing and more and was released in March 2016. In games, the series will appear in the next installment of the Apron of Magic Arcade game. More information of the franchise was unveiled on the 2016 Sanrio Expo on January 30, 2016, which includes the Sanrio Puroland Mascot form of Lip as well as revealed merchandise.

=== Anime ===
An anime adaptation of the series, titled Rilu Rilu Fairilu: Yōsei no Door (Japanese: リルリルフェアリル ～妖精のドア～, Hepburn: Riru Riru Feariru: Yōsei no Doa; Rilu Rilu Fairilu: The Fairy's Door), began airing in all TXN stations in Japan on February 6, 2016, replacing Jewelpet: Magical Change on its initial time-slot, and ended on March 25, 2017. It is directed by Sakura Gojō and written by Aya Matsui. A sequel, titled Rilu Rilu Fairilu: Mahō no Kagami (Japanese: リルリルフェアリル～魔法の鏡～, Hepburn: Riru Riru Feariru: Mahō no Kagami; Rilu Rilu Fairilu: Magical Mirror) was announced by Sanrio via the anime's official Twitter account, began airing on April 7, 2017, and ended on March 30, 2018. It is directed by Sakura Gojō and Nana Imanaka, written by Akemi Omode. A third season, titled Oshiete Mahō no Pendulum: Rilu Rilu Fairilu (Japanese: おしえて魔法のペンデュラム～リルリルフェアリル～, Hepburn: Oshiete Mahō no Penduramu: Riru Riru Feariru; Tell Me, Magical Pendulum: Rilu Rilu Fairilu) began airing on Kids Station, Animax, and Tokyo MX on July 7, July 8 and July 15, 2018, respectively. It ended on January 5, 2019.
