= List of PriPara episodes =

- No. of episodes: 140

Release
- Original network: TV Tokyo
- Original release: July 5, 2014 – March 28, 2017

Season chronology
- ← Previous; Pretty Rhythm: Rainbow Live episodes Next → Idol Time PriPara

The following is a list of episodes of the PriPara anime television series. The first opening and ending themes are "Make it!" by Iris and "Jumpin' Dancin'" by Prizmmy. The second opening and ending themes are "Miracle☆Paradise" (ミラクル☆パラダイス) by Iris and "Sparkling Runway" (キラキランウェイ, Kiraki Ran'uei) by Prism Box. The third opening and ending themes are "Realize!" by Iris and "I Just Wanna Be With You ~Between Virtual and Reality~" (I Just Wanna Be With You ～仮想と真実の狭間で～, I Just Wanna Be With You ~Kasou to Shinjitsu no Hazama de~) by Prizmmy. The fourth opening and ending themes are "Dream Parade" by Iris and "Idol Strength Lesson GO!" (アイドルキンリョク Lesson GO!, Aidoru Kinryoku Lesson GO!) by Laala Manaka (Himika Akenaya) and the Prism Idol Trainees. Idol Strength Lesson GO! is later replaced by the fifth ending theme "Heart-Clenching Love Song" (胸キュンLove Song) by Super Girls. The fifth opening and sixth ending themes are "Bright Fantasy" (ブライトファンタジー, Buraito Fantajī) by Iris and "Rainbow・Melody" (レインボウ・メロディー♪, Reinbō・Merodī♪) by Iris, Aroma Kurosu (Yui Makino), Mikan Shiratama (Yui Watanabe), Fuwari Midorikaze (Azusa Sato), Ajimi Kiki (Reina Ueda) and Hibiki Shikyoin (Mitsuki Saiga). The sixth opening and seventh ending themes are "Goin'on" by Iris and "LOVE TROOPER" by Prizmmy. The seventh opening and eighth ending themes are "Ready Smile!" by Iris and "PriPara☆Dancing!!!" by Laala Manaka (Himika Akenaya) and Gaaruru (Asami Sanada). "Ready Smile!" is later replaced by the eighth opening theme "Brand New Dreamer" by Laala Manaka (Himika Akenaya) and Non Manaka/Triangle (Minami Tanaka). There are four versions of "Brand New Dreamer" which alternate after a certain number of episodes. "PriPara Dancing!!!" is later replaced by the ninth ending "Growin' Jewel!" by Iris. "Brand New Dreamer" is later replaced by the ninth opening "Shining Star" by Iris.

== Episode list ==
=== Season 1 (2014-15) ===
No.	Title	Original air date
1	"I Became an Idol!"; Transliteration: "Aidoru Hajime Chaimashita!" (Japanese: アイドル始めちゃいました!)	July 5, 2014
One morning Laala is getting ready for school when she sees her favorite idol unit, Saints performing on television. She eagerly stops to watch, recalling how this is a rare surprise since they haven't performed in three years, but her mother scolds her and points out that she has to eat breakfast. They begin bickering and after hurriedly finishing Laala rushes out to catch up with Nao. They chat about Saints while heading to school, desperately wishing they could become idols and how they must wait for that one special moment when a girl will discover her PriPara Ticket to grant her access to the paradise for aspiring idols. However, Nao reveals she just received hers, much to Laala's shock as Nao explains seeing it earlier. Laala is disappointed as she doesn't have one yet but they drop the discussion upon finding Headmistress Gloria outside of Paprika Academy, searching students for PriTickets as they enter. Laala expresses concern for Nao but she assures her that it will be fine since her long hair hides her collar. She hid her ticket in a small pocket she sewn to it; but alas, Gloria takes out Rina -her special PriTicket sucking device- and she not only finds Nao's Ticket, but several others. Gloria warns everyone that if they left their PriTickets at home she expects to see them on her desk the following day. With both Laala and Nao depressed they head to Music Class while wondering why Gloria is against young students becoming idols but they can't think of any plausible reason. Nao is saddened she couldn't debut before attending this school- unlike Sophy, the only student who has been granted access to PriPara and can't have her ticket stolen away. Laala is surprised seeing how much Nao truly wants to become an idol as she admits that she is fine watching them, but realizing she forgot her recorder back in class she is forced to head back. But before she gets far, Mirei Minami -the Head Disciplinarian- stop her to scold her for running in the hallway. Laala points out that because they're outside it shouldn't be a problem, but Mirei refuses to listen and she is given her 96th transgression paper. Eventually Laala arrives home and is very worn out. She helps a customer with their order before asking if she may have gotten a PriPara Ticket while away, but her mom doesn't believe so, and she asks Laala to get some tomato since their supply is running low. Laala is really tired but seeing no choice she takes off. As she makes her way through town Laala spots a PriTicket Bag lying on the ground and looks inside to find a bunch of tickets. She calls around for someone named Mirei but hears no response. Deciding getting the bag back to the owner is more important than the tomato, she heads into Prism Stone, a store nearby that hosts entrance to PriPara. She briefs the woman, Meganee, on what happened upon arrival and Meganee reveals Mirei is already inside. She pulls Laala towards the gate but Laala tries to tell her that she doesn't have a Ticket yet. Just then, a PriTicket appears out of nowhere and floats down to Laala, much to her surprise. She is delighted until recalling that she isn't allowed into PriPara. Meganee manages to convince her that it would be okay in order to return Mirei's bag though, and explains that because of an audition she has she is going to need it. She observes Laala and determines that the brand most befitting of her would be Twinkle Ribbon, and sets this as her stage outfit on her card. She suggests that Laala try to perform while there for some experience and leads her to the scanner, and upon arrival into PriPara, Laala is startled realizing she has grown up as she admires herself wearing the Cutie Ribbon Coord. The Meganee there explains why this is and wishes Laala a nice visit, along with explaining why she resembles the woman at Prism Stone. Laala observes everything surrounding her and finds herself amazed by all of the sights, then she starts to run through the streets while calling for Mirei again. But once more nobody responds to her. Elsewhere, Mirei is yelling at Kuma for signing her up for a unit audition. She is very angry and threatens to break contract with him if he doesn't fix it by finding her a partner; which he doesn't take seriously until she reacts with violence, forcing him to leave. In the process of him trying to locate an idol willing to listen, Laala accidentally smacks him with the bag. She is surprised to see Kuma and he stops to chastise her for this, then explains that he is a Mascot Manager for idols. Laala apologizes and explains that she is new to PriPara, so she doesn't know what to do. Hearing the commotion Mirei approaches them and spots her bag, with Laala happily handing it over. She explains finding it in town before Mirei asks Laala to join her, due to needing a partner. Laala tries to tell her that she hasn't performed or even danced before, but Mirei thinks it might be okay since she likes PriPara. While hesitant, Laala is unable to refuse and they exchange names before heading to PriPara TV. When it is announced the registration for the Fresh Idol Live will be closing the girls hurry inside as entry number six, Pretty App starts to perform. While they wait an anxious Laala watches the many screens of various performances when Mirei asks if she knows any songs by Saints. She asks Laala to sing something for her, only to scold her for being too quiet and she starts pulling on her cheeks to try encouraging her to be more bold and sing as loudly as she wants, and this seems to cause Laala to realize something. She agrees to try as their turn is announced, and they appear on stage. Initially Laala is very shocked as she looks around at the crowd of observers, but she gives it her best effort and sings with Mirei. Everyone is quickly captivated by Laala and she goes on to perform in a Making Drama and Cyalume change with Mirei. After the performance the girls return outside to find some Idols cheering for them as they gain their PriTickets. The performance was recorded on them and they exchange their friend tickets as Mirei tells Laala that they should perform together again. As Laala is given a PriTicket Bag and some other items she suddenly remembers that she never got the tomato her mother asked for and quickly runs for the exit. It's then Mirei reveals setting this up from the start in order to find a partner, having purposely dropped her bag knowing a good person would pick it up and try to return it. Kuma compliments her brilliance, but he mentions that she slipped out of her cute character before revealing his desire to make Laala a top idol now that he knows she has the legendary Prism Voice
2	"You Can't Break a Promise, Pri"; Transliteration: "Yakusoku Yabuccha Dame Puri-" (Japanese: 約束やぶっちゃダメぷりっ)	July 12, 2014
Laala heads off to school and is scolded by the head disciplinarian Minami for being late. Laala also finds she has accidentally brought her PriTickets to school and is nearly caught by the headmistress. She manages to get to PriPara and perform with Mirei, resolving to attend PriPara no matter what. Upon leaving PriPara, Laala discovers that Mirei is the school president Minami.
3	"Team Break-up? No way, kuma!" Transliteration: "Chimu Kaisan? Komaru-kumā!" (Japanese: チーム解散？困るクマ～!)	July 19, 2014
After discovering Mirei is the head disciplinarian of her school, she wonders if they can really stay partners. However, Mirei reveals that no such rule for banning PriPara exists. Laala tells Mirei she is still worried about the headmistress discovering her secret. Laala, having overheard the meeting through the window, decides to show Mirei how much her support means to her and comes up with the new making drama.
4	"Capisce! Cheer For You"; Transliteration: "Kashikoma! Genki For You" (Japanese: かしこま！元気 For You)	July 26, 2014
After trying to corner Laala on the last day of school, Gloria ends up following her through town. Laala tries to hide from the headmistress, but Gloria can smell her PriTickets. A fan of Laala named Eiko approaches her and helps her escape Gloria by taking her within 100 meters of Prism Stone, something Gloria cannot do. Laala promises to give Eiko the best performance she has, but has trouble finding a way to get to PriPara in time. With the thrill of Laala's performance, Eiko wins her tennis match.
5	"I Wanna Sing With Sophy!"; Transliteration: "Atashi, Sofi-san to Utaitai Wa Ni!" (Japanese: あたし, そふぃさんと歌いたいワニ!)	August 2, 2014
Laala witnesses lots of fans about to attend a performance by a popular idol called Sophy Hojo. Afterwards, Laala decides she wants to enter the Shining Future Idol Grand Prix but Mirei says they need another team member. The head guard Sadako tells them they are not worthy of speaking to Sophy and leave with her. Laala attempts to talk to Sophy again outside of PriPara, but still meets resistance from the Royal Guard.
6	"Objection? Laala's Coming Over To My Place-Pri!"; Transliteration: "Igiari? Raara ga Uchi ni Yattekitappuri!" (Japanese: 異議あり？ らぁらがウチ二やってきたっぷり!)	August 9, 2014
Kuma tells Laala and Mirei they will be debuting a new song in a couple of days. Mirei decides they need to come up with a new making drama, and start training if they wish to enter the same level of auditions as Sophy. Mirei shows Laala her room, but scolds Laala when she tries to look at a photo album. Both Mirei's parents begin arguing over Mirei's future career, but Laala breaks up the argument. The girls both come up with a new making drama to use in their next performance.
7	"Search for the Red Flash..."; Transliteration: "Reddo Furasshu o Sagashite..." (Japanese: レッドフラッシュを探して...)	August 16, 2014
Laala is still determined to get Sophy to join her and Mirei, much to Mirei and Kuma's annoyance. The next day, Laala enters PriPara and is surprised to meet the pickled plum girl. They also meet Meganii, who handles the debut class idols. After their performance, Sophy meets Laala and Mirei in the hallway and tells them how wonderful their performance was.
8	"Excitement! Summer! Swimsuits! Capisce at the Pool!"; Transliteration: "Dokidoki! Natsu da! Mizugi da! Pūru de Kashikoma♪" (Japanese: ドキドキ！夏だ！水着だ！プールでかしこまっ♪)	August 23, 2014
On summer vacation, Laala meets Nao at the pool and the two have fun together. Nao sees an interview of Sophy on TV and tells Laala that she like her but that she likes another idol better, one called Laala. Laala decides to tell Nao the truth, but Nao becomes angry calling Laala a liar. Later, Nao and Laala reconcile, with Nao vowing to keep it a secret.
9	"Exciting Idol Meeting!"; Transliteration: "Tokimeki Aidoru Daishūgō!" (Japanese: ときめきアイドル大集合！)	August 30, 2014
Laala and Mirei find out they will be participating on a game show, where the winner will get to perform with Sophy. Usagi is worried though that people will find out about Sophy's fancy mode and order the Royal Guard to be on alert. Both Laala and Mirei then get to perform together. Afterwards outside of PriPara, Sophy, Mirei and Laala meet up.
10	"Autumn-colored Lovely Live"; Transliteration: "Aki-iro Raburī Raibu" (Japanese: 秋色ラブリーライブ)	September 6, 2014
Laala and Mirei perform in the Autumn Color Girls Live event, which is being sponsored by a big cosmetics company. The winners will be the image girls of a new Autumn-themed lipstick. While looking for inspiration, Laala and Mirei meet Laala's fan Eiko and her tennis rival, Love Tochiotome. Mirei and Laala manage to win their performance and go to see Sophy, who refuses to take their pickled plum present and hands back Laala's friend ticket, leaving Mirei and Laala confused.
11	"What To Do? What will Happen!? The Third Member!!!"; Transliteration: "Dō suru? Dō naru!? Sanninme!!!" (Japanese: どうする? どうなる!? 三人目!!!)	September 13, 2014
Laala and Mirei are still confused as to why Sophy declined to join their team. Kuma tells them to forget about it and concentrate on finding a new third member. Meanwhile, Kuma finds a new third member called Dorothy West who Mirei initially takes a liking to. Laala finds out Sophy will be performing a new making drama in her next live so goes to see it. However, Sophy is unable to complete the making drama, which shows her locked in a cage, unable to get out. Seeing how unhappy Sophy is, Laala vows to free her friend from her emotional cage.
12	"Spread Your Wings, Sophy!"; Transliteration: "Habatake, Sofi!" (Japanese: はばたけ, そふぃ!)	September 20, 2014
Laala refuses to let Sophy go despite Mirei's insistence. She reveals to Laala that Sophy will be holding her team forming ceremony the next day. The girls go to PriPara but Laala attempts to get into the ceremony before Usagi locks her out. Meanwhile, Mirei and Kuma are discussing the new team when Dorothy West arrives with her twin Reona. Mirei then declines Dorothy, since she brings along another member to join, the teams can only consist of 3 members, not 4. The three girls perform their first live together, and Sophy is finally able to finish her making drama with the help of Laala and Mirei.
13	"Look at the Sky and Laugh! Team Name Announcement!"; Transliteration: "Sora Mite Waratte♡Chīmu Mei Happyō！" (Japanese: 空見て笑って♡チーム名発表！)	September 27, 2014
Kuma announces that Mirei, Laala and Sophy will be performing a live for winning the Sparkling Grand Prix, but that they need to come up with a team name. Sophy reveals that she has also been attempting to do things more on her own and her Royal Guards also thank Laala and Mirei for helping Sophy break out of her emotional cage. Solami♡Smile perform their live, while the defeated Usagi watches envious and plotting revenge with the West twins.
14	"A Rival Appears! From Now On, Welcome!!"; Transliteration: "Raibaru Tōjō! Igo, yoroshiku!!" (Japanese: ライバル登場！イゴ、よろしく！！)	October 4, 2014
Sion Todo is a girl whose skill in the game of Go is unmatched by anyone. Remembering that she received a PriTicket some time ago, she goes looking for it, finding a warning ticket given to her by Mirei for solving a Go puzzle in the hallway. Wanting revenge she manages to find her PriTicket and heads to Prism Stone. Sion is soon met and promised the revenge she wishes to gain and joins the twin unit of Dorothy and Reona, which is led by the once-defeated Usagi. They form a team called Dressing Pafé and vow to beat SoLaMi♡SMILE at every opportunity.
15	"Critical Situation? Sion vs. Mirei-Pri!"; Transliteration: "Isshoku Sokuhatsu? Sion vs. Mirei-puri!" (Japanese: 一触即発？シオンVSみれぃぷりっ！)	October 11, 2014
Sion and Mirei both argue about who is better than who. Because of this, they try to settle their differences in every (and any) way they can. They also end up dragging their ultimates into the argument which eventually leads to a show down in PriPara. Dressing Pafé and Solami♡Smile end up tying and Sion comments on how much of a worthy opponent Mirei is, forcing her to trade friends tickets.
16	"Exclusive! Laala's Secret is Out of the Bag!?"; Transliteration: "Tokudane! Raara no Himitsu Barechatta!?" (Japanese: 特ダネ！らぁらのヒミツばれちゃった！？)	October 18, 2014
Gloria is determined to discover the reason behind Laala's strange behaviour lately. She tasks a student called Nene Tokuda to spy on Laala. Sneaking into PriPara she discovers Laala's secret of being an idol and says she will inform the headmistress and have Laala's PriTicket confiscated. However all the other girls come to Laala's aid and show Nene how amazing PriPara really is. With her new love of PriPara, Nene vows to support Laala and the other idols.
17	"Halloween Terror! Jack・OH! Ran-tan!?"; Transliteration: "Kyōfu no Harouin! Jakku-OH! Ran-tan!?" (Japanese: 恐怖のハロウィン！ジャック・OH！蘭たん！？)	October 25, 2014
It's Halloween in PriPara and Laala signs up to participate in a haunted house. Laala meets a girl called Ran who is trying to be scary but everyone thinks is cute. Laala decides to help Ran to scare some of the idols. Laala successfully helps Ran scare some of the idols in a haunted house and trades friends tickets with her. Laala also meets a mysterious girl called Falulu.
18	"Reona, Dash at Full Force!"; Transliteration: "Reona, Zenryoku Dasshu nano!" (Japanese: レオナ、全力ダッシュなの！)	November 1, 2014
Reona and Dorothy transfer to Paprika Academy, where a very shocking truth about Reona is revealed, it turned out that Reona was in fact a male, and the goddess had made an exception for him to be able to enter PriPara. Reona is then tasked with creating the brand new Making Drama for Dressing Pafe. After realizing making other people happy is what makes him happy, he has an idea of a making drama.
19	"Mirei and Kuma, A Fated Encounter-Pri-Kuma!"; Transliteration: "Mirei to Kuma, Unmei no Deai-puri-kuma!" (Japanese: みれぃとクマ、運命の出会いぷりクマ！)	November 8, 2014
Solami♡Smile are in their dressing room when Meganee enters and congratulates Mirei on her one year debut anniversary. Laala and Sophy congratulate her and Laala is shocked to discover Mirei debuted in elementary school. Kuma then bursts in saying he lost Mirei's PriPass, and she will not be able to Cyalume Change during the performance without it. Mirei yells at Kuma to find it before their performance later and Laala goes to help him. Meanwhile, Dressing Pafé are outside Papa's Pasta discussing how to beat Solami Smile when Gloria shows up. They hide under the table and wonder why Gloria banned PriPara for elementary school students.
20	"Pasta vs. Ninja!"; Transliteration: "Pasuta vs. Ninja!" (Japanese: パスタVS忍者！)	November 15, 2014
A new okonomiyaki shop opens and causes competition for Papa's Pasta. The owners of the store are revealed to be Dorothy and Reona's parents. Using their status as idols, Dressing Pafé start taking business away from Papa's Pasta. The promotion war ends with a Competition where Gloria is chosen to taste different foods from each restaurant. Seeing the amount of good publicity for the area, all the girls begin promoting all the shops in the district. The girls then decide to leave their competitiveness to the PriPara stage.
21	"Disbandment!? Sophy's Bodyguards"; Transliteration: "Kaisan!? Sofi-sama Shin'entai" (Japanese: 解散！？そふぃ様親衛隊)	November 22, 2014
Now that Sophy is part of Solami♡Smile, the royal guards feel they have outlived their purpose and disband. However, Sophy feels it is her fault all her friends are feeling down. Her disappearance causes Laala and Mirei concern, but thanks to the royal guard's resourcefulness, Sophy is finally found. Before they do, Sophy performs a live with a new making drama involving all her friends to show them how much their support means to her.
22	"Live at the School Festival-kumā!"; Transliteration: "Gakuensai de Raibukumā!" (Japanese: 学園祭でライブクマ～！)	November 29, 2014
It's school festival time at Paprika Private and Mirei decides to have SoLaMi♡SMILE and Dressing Pafé perform at the festival. But, a new rule banning events from PriPara at the school rises, canceling the event. Gloria is determined to stop the PriPara concert from happening. But with the help of Meganee and Mirei's lawyer parents they are able to have the show outside of school grounds meaning Gloria cannot stop them. Gloria had thought that she went too soft with the PriPara ban.
23	"The Last Day of PriPara!"; Transliteration: "Puripara Saigo no Hi dessu wa!" (Japanese: プリパラ最後の日でっすわ！)	December 6, 2014
As a result of the school festival, Headmistress Gloria decides to take revenge into her own hands by banning PriPara to all students. The middle school's headmaster announces that he will resign to take care of his newborn child. Headmistress Gloria then becomes the middle school section's headmistress. She confiscates all the middle school PriTickets except Mirei's who safely managed to conceal her ticket. All of the students try to convince her to reconsider, but Gloria will not listen. In the end, Dorothy and Reona sneak into Gloria's office and steal their PriTickets back, along with Sion's and Sophy's. The next morning, Dorothy gives Sion her PriTicket and Dressing Pafé perform in PriPara. They end up getting caught by Gloria, and have punishments.
24	"Goodbye, PriPara"; Transliteration: "Sayonara, Puripara" (Japanese: さよなら、プリパラ)	December 13, 2014
After discovering an old PriTicket in Gloria's office, Laala, Mirei and Dressing Pafé learn that Gloria used to be an idol in PriPara. Just as Gloria finds out that both Mirei and Laala are idols, she reveals her idol past. She was once and idol called Sugar who met another girl named Himeka in PriPara and became good friends. Laala decides to perform a live with Solami♡Smile to show the headmistress how wrong she is, with Dressing Pafé forcing her to watch. Afterwards, Gloria walks to PriPara and ends up reuniting with Himeka, who turns out to be Laala's mother.
25	"Christmas Present for you!" Transliteration: "Kurisumasu Purezento Fō Yū!" (Japanese: クリスマスプレゼントフォーユー！)	December 20, 2014
Laala is shocked to learn that Headmistress Gloria and her mother used to know each other when they were younger. Himeka reveals she did wait for Gloria but because both girls looked so different outside of PriPara they didn't recognize each other. Himeka also revealed her headmistress also banned PriPara meaning she was unable to return until after she graduated. Both women reconcile and Gloria lifts her ban on PriPara. Solami♡Smile and Dressing Pafé combine to one group to compete in the Christmas Grand Prix to win the Paradise shoes, with Himeka and Gloria cheering them on.
26	"That Girl Finally Makes Her Debut"; Transliteration: "Iyoiyo Anoko ga Debyū-dechu" (Japanese: いよいよあの子がデビューでちゅ)	December 27, 2014
After winning the Paradise shoes in the Christmas Grand Prix, the girls meet a mysterious girl, whose unicorn manger predicts her debut! Laala recognizes her as the girl she met at Halloween, Falulu. Falulu makes her debut in the second competition for the Paradise Tiara, blowing the competition out of the water and reaching the final rank of debut class all the way from student class. The girls wonder if they have finally met their match and decide to return to separate units to continue their friendly rivalry.
27	"The New Year's Kashikoma!"; Transliteration: "Akeome de Kashikoma!" (Japanese: あけおめでかしこま！)	January 10, 2015
As the new year begins, Meganii reveals the final event to win the last part of the Paradise Coord. Lazla sneezes, and is revealed to have caught a cold to following day, leading Non to nurse her back to her peppy self. Mirei, Sophy, Sion, Dorothy and Reona come to cheer the sick Laala up, along with Gloria and some of her PriPara friends, but Non tells them to leave because they are too noisy. The next day, Laala discovers she is over her cold but that Non has caught it from her.
28	"PriPara Goes with The Pandas"; Transliteration: "Puripara Igo Panda Degozai Masu" (Japanese: プリパラ 囲碁パンダでございます)	January 17, 2015
An old rival, Iroha, challenges Sion to a game of Go live on PriPara TV in order to prove who has what it takes to take on Falulu. The game is played with black and white panda mascots. Sion and Iroha are evenly matched and Sion cannot seem to find a way to win, but after a talk with Dorothy and Reona, manages to win the match. Cosmo give Dressing Pafé a new team Cyalume Coord, meaning they can wear their old ones as Casual Coords. Meanwhile, after hearing from Unicorn that Falulu is a 'Vocal Doll', Mirei asked Kuma what it is. Kuma states that a Vocal Doll is a being born in the PriPara world who possesses all the qualities to become a divine idol, but that it is just an urban legend.
29	"EZ Do Glosercise"; Transliteration: "EZ Do Gurosasaizu" (Japanese: EZ DO グロササイズ)	January 24, 2015
With only a week until the Paradise Coord competition, Laala, Sophy and Mirei are faced with a lack of training. That is until Gloria and Love put them into shape at a training camp! The girls must complete the training if they are ever to leave. While Laala & Mirei are able to push through, they are worried about Sophy and her weak constitution. However Sophy manages to push through and the girls pass their training.
30	"Heart-Pounding! The Paradise Coord Belongs to Who!?"; Transliteration: "Dokidoki! Paradaisu Kōde wa Dare no Mono!?" (Japanese: ドキドキ！パラダイスコーデは誰のもの！？)	January 31, 2015
It's finally time for the decisive battle for the final piece of the Paradise Coord. Unicorn reveals how she is on a mission to make the Paradise Coord shine and that she found Falulu's PriTicket in the library one day. Seeing that Falulu has all the qualities of becoming a divine idol, Unicorn believes she can make the Coord shine. Falulu wins the competition performing seven making drama's at once, winning all the parts of the Paradise Coord.
31	"Smile! SoLaMi Smile"; Transliteration: "Smile! Sorami Sumairu" (Japanese: スマイル！そらみ♡スマイル)	February 7, 2015
After the shocking results of the last PriPara, Laala, Mirei and Sophy along with Sion, Dorothy and Reona fell down at their defeat. It's up to their friends, family and fans to cheer them up. Sophy's sister Cosmo performs a live involving all of the girls friends in order to show them how much they mean to each other. The girls are touched and vow to continue to make everyone smile.
32	"Mirei Quits Saying "Pri""; Transliteration: "Mirei, Puri Yamerutte yo" (Japanese: みれぃ、ぷりやめるってよ)	February 14, 2015
On Valentine's Day, Mirei reveals that she decided to announce that she is SoLaMi Smile's Mirei, but Amamiya ruins the announcement during the morning assembly. Mirei drops her character and attempts to be herself, but this results in her being thrown off in her personality. During the Valentine's Day assembly, Amamiya gives Mirei chocolate as a present before giving her her first warning ticket. Amamiya tells Mirei that even though her bubbly character was just a reason to hide her true self to begin with. Mirei sees the error of her ways and finally embraces both sides of her personality.
33	"Laala, Tell Me More About You"; Transliteration: "Raara no koto, oshiete" (Japanese: らぁらのこと、おしえて)	February 21, 2015
With a second chance at obtaining the Paradise Coord only weeks away, everyone is training hard. Laala leaves training early and is asked to sign autographs by her fans. Laala also witnesses Falulu doing the same and is astonished at how fast she does them. Meanwhile, Unicorn prevents Falulu trading friends tickets saying that all her fans need to do is support her to the fullest limit, however Falulu witnesses Laala trading with her fans. Falulu begins to wonder more about Laala and asks her all about her idol story up until now.
34	"Falulu's Friend"; Transliteration: "Faruru no Tomodachi" (Japanese: ファルルのトモダチ)	February 28, 2015
Laala wants to show Falulu the outside world using her PriPass. However, Unicorn is determined to keep Falulu locked away and takes her PriPass from her. The next day, the gang visit Falulu to give her the flower, but Unicorn catches them. Furious, Unicorn attempts to punish Falulu only to have Dressing Pafé intervene and the girls escape. Falulu then performs a live with a new making drama, much to the dismay of Unicorn.
35	"The Last Stage Battle!"; Transliteration: "Saigo no Sutēji Batoru!" (Japanese: 最後のステージバトル！)	March 7, 2015
SoLaMi Dressing reforms, with a new song for the last battle against Falulu, which takes place on a special stage atop PriPara Hills. Before the concert, the girls ask Meganii and Meganee if they have discovered anything about Falulu. SoLaMi Dressing performs first, followed by Falulu, with both Laala and Falulu excited to be competing as friends. Solami Dressing wins by a margin and gain the paradise Coord. After the concert, Falulu approaches the winners podium and attempts to trade friends tickets with Laala.
36	"Falulu, Please Wake Up!!"; Transliteration: "Faruru, Mezameru dechū-!!" (Japanese: ファルル、目覚めるでちゅーっ！！)	March 14, 2015
Falulu suddenly collapses and the blame is all on Laala. Desperate to save her friend, Laala wonders if she can use her prism voice to awaken the Paradise Coord. Unicorn scoffs at her saying her prism voice is a million years too early to do that. Determined to success, Laala attempts to strengthen her voice by performing as many lives as she can.
37	"Call Forth a Miracle! Miracle Live"; Transliteration: "Kiseki yo Hokore! Mirakuku Raibu" (Japanese: 奇跡よ起これ！ミラクルライブ)	March 21, 2015
Falulu's only chance is a miracle. SoLaMi Dressing prepare to perform their Wake Up Live, but Laala begins to feel nervous. With all of PriPara watching, Laala wonders if she will be able to do it. Encouraged by her friends they begin to perform, everyone holds their breath as they Cyalume Change but it works and the Paradise Coord shines. However, they are unable to keep it up and the light fades. Laala feels that she has let everyone down and tries to apologize only for the audience to burst into song. The prism sparkle suddenly appears and Kuma says that anyone who wishes to convey their feelings can have the prism voice.
38	"Kashikoma for Everyone's Friends!"; Transliteration: "Mina no Tomodachi! Kashikoma!" (Japanese: み～んなトモダチ, かしこま！)	March 28, 2015
With Falulu awakened, everyone decides to celebrate her first birthday. Kuma and Usagi announce that all members of Solami Dressing have reached the major class idol rank, but Unicorn seems distant. SoLaMi Dressing performs a farewell concert with Laala and Falulu promising to meet again soon as Pegasus flies away. The next day, the girls go to register for a performance only to have Meganii Akai inform them that SoLaMi♡Dressing and its sub-units are disbanded.

=== Season 2 (2015-16) ===
No. in series	No. in season	Title	Original air date
39	1	"Will I become an Idol Once Again!?"; Transliteration: "Mata mata Aidoru Hajime Chaimashita!?" (Japanese: またまたアイドル始めちゃいました！？)	April 4, 2015
Laala and the others are upset about their teams being disbanded. However, Meganii shows them a new area of PriPara, the PriPara Dream Theater, and tells them about the upcoming Idol Dream Grand Prix. The winner of the Grand Prix will gain a new Coord that will shine brighter than the Paradise Coord and the chance to appear in the PriPara Dream Parade. Meganii also gives the girls the Cyalume Charm and state they will need to form a five member team to be eligible to perform in the Dream Theater. Laala is also asked to perform in a demonstration and gains the pink lovely Cyalume Charm. Two new idols also appear.
40	2	"Angel and Devil, Neko"; Transliteration: "Tenshi to Akuma-Nekoon" (Japanese: 天使と悪魔ねこぉ～ん)	April 11, 2015
Two new idols, Mikan and Aroma make their debut along with their mascot, Neko. It is also revealed that a unit can only be formed if there is a manager to witness the formation ceremony. However, when the girls try to get Kuma and Usagi to agree to reform, they refuse. It turns out both mascots had their fortune read by Neko and if they reform their units they will have great misfortune, though it was a ruse to prevent Laala, Dorothy, and Sion from joining their old units. The new idols then make their debut.
41	3	"The Cursed Solo Live-pri!"; Transliteration: "Norowareta Soro Raibu-puri!" (Japanese: のろわれたソロライブぷり！)	April 18, 2015
Aroma's next target is Mirei, who is desperately trying to reform SoLaMi Smile in time for the next live. Laala gets matching ribbons as presents for Mirei and Sophy, but Mirei's present mysteriously vanishes. Mirei can't tell Laala and she already said she is using the present in her next solo live to celebrate her election to student council president. After hunting all over Pripara, Mirei finally finds the box with her present in and that someone placed a frog, causing it to move around seemingly on its own.
42	4	"The Man Who Came from Prazil"; Transliteration: "Purajiru kara Kita Otoko" (Japanese: プラジルから来た男)	April 25, 2015
Sophy's dad is back in Japan after his long journey in South America. He has grown plum plantations abroad for Sophy, and he's come to pick her up so she can live overseas with him. Sophy has a choice to make, either go overseas with her dad or stay with her friends in Japan. Sophy decides to show her dad how much more independent she has become because of going to Pripara with her friends. She performs a solo live with a new making drama and gains the purple cool Cyalume Charm. Sophy's dad seeing how much his daughter has grown decides to let her stay in Japan.
43	5	"The Dream Theater Number 1! ~kuma!" Transliteration: "Doriimu Shiataa Ichiban Nori! Kuma!" (Japanese: ドリームシアター一番乗り！クマ！)	May 2, 2015
The Dream Theater's construction is finally complete. The winner who places first gets to perform with their team live on stage! The teams are Dressing Pafé, Solami Smile and Aromageddon. Each team participates in three events with the winner of the final event earning enough points to win and register as the first team to compete in the Dream Theater.
44	6	"Go, Farewell-usa!?"; Transliteration: "Igo, Saraba Usa!?" (Japanese: イゴ、さらばウサ！？)	May 9, 2015
Determined to get Sion and Dorothy to join Aromageddon, Aroma and Mikan trick both girls into thinking the other joined Aromageddon already, causing Sion and Dorothy to have a major fight and refuse to reform Dressing Pafé. Still determined to make Dorothy and Sion reconcile, Reona attempts to perform a solo live. Afterwards, Mirei, Sophy, and Laala meet Aroma and Mikan outside who both attend Paprika Private Academy as elementary school students.
45	7	"The Devil from the Neighboring Class ~nano!" Transliteration: "Tonari no Kurasu no Akuma nano" (Japanese: となりのクラスの悪魔なの)	May 16, 2015
Laala discovers that Aroma and Mikan have both attend to Paprika Private Academy and are in the class next door to Laala. Aroma asks Mirei if SoLaMi Smile would consider joining with Aromageddon to form the ultimate team to win the Idol Dream Grand Prix, but Mirei refuses. Then, during a Live, Aroma asks Dressing Pafé to joint Aromageddon to form Aroma Dressing Pafé, which Sion says she will think about it.
46	8	"Devi&An Preschool! Ribbit?"; Transliteration: "Debi & En Hoikuen! ~Kero?" (Japanese: でび&えん保育園！ケロ？)	May 23, 2015
While walking home after school, Laala meets up with Mikan and Aroma, as well as two preschool children, Anko and Miruku, who have lost their dog. The group split up into two teams to help look for the dog. While searching Aroma helps one of the preschoolers overcome her shyness, and Mikan tells Laala how she and Aroma became friends in preschool and how Aroma developed her devil character to overcome her own shyness.
47	9	"Keep it a Secret from Aroma ~nano" Transliteration: "Aroma ni wa Naisho nano" (Japanese: あろまにはナイショなの)	May 30, 2015
Mikan is very hungry because she hasn't eaten lunch yet. Aroma tells her she will go and buy her something from in town if she waits at school. However, Neko calls Mikan and asks her to come to Pripara and help make something for Aroma's birthday. SoLaMi♡SMILE show up and offer to help her make a cake. Things don't go well as Mikan keeps eating the ingredients. Thinking Mikan has betrayed Aroma, she then decides to end their friendship.
48	10	"June 6, Falling Out Idols"; Transliteration: "Rokugatsu Muika, Zekkō Aidoru" (Japanese: 6月6日、絶交アイドル)	June 6, 2015
After witnessing Mikan eating cake with Solami Smile, Aroma tears up the drawing Mikan gave her when they were in preschool and disbands Aromageddon. Aroma decides to give Mikan another chance and Mikan manages to complete the birthday cake. The girls are then taken to the Dream Theater Stage and become the first group to perform a Dream Theater Live. After the performance, Laala notices their charm have stopped shining. Meganii explains that in order to fully evaluate everyone's potential.
49	11	"That's My Little Sister"; Transliteration: "Imōto yo" (Japanese: いもうとよ)	June 13, 2015
Everyone is excitedly discussing the upcoming events when a small female rabbit mascot comes running up to them and Usagi reveals her to be his little sister, Usacha. After introductions, Usacha tells Usagi she has come to see how her brother works as a mascot in the hope of becoming one herself when she grows up. Meanwhile in a far away country, a new idol leaves home in Europe for Japan, in order to participate in the Dream Theater.
50	12	"Fuwari, Girl of the Palps"; Transliteration: "Parupusu no Shōjo Fuwari" (Japanese: パルプスの少女ふわり)	June 20, 2015
Laala climbs the tree and to speak to a girl named Fuwari Midorikaze, who has come to Japan to participate in Dream Theater Grand Prix. Fuwari appears unsure, so she decides to do her best to become an idol. Meanwhile, the mysterious prince is seen flying towards Pripara in a private jet.
51	13	"The Prince and the Blue Bird of Misfortune"; Transliteration: "Purinsu-sama to Fushiawase no Aoi Tori" (Japanese: プリンス様と不幸せの青い鳥)	June 27, 2015
The mysterious prince arrives in Parajuku and makes his way to Paprika Private Academy. Fuwari recognizes him but he ignores her. During morning assembly, the prince introduces himself as Hibiki Shikyoin, and will be attending Paprika Private Academy. Dressing Pafé introduces Fuwari to many other mascots flock to her because of her natural charm, except a timid blue bird. Kuma reveals the bird to be Toriko, who is always fearful of others and tends to keep to herself. Note: Until Season 2 episode 35, Hibiki is referred to as male.
52	14	"Fuwari Dances! First Live ~tori!" Transliteration: "Fuwari Mau! Hatsu Raibu ~tori!" (Japanese: ふわり舞う！初ライブトリ！)	July 4, 2015
Gloria tells Fuwari that in order to become a proper princess she must attend special lessons, taught by the headmistress herself. Kuma is revealed to be the one calling, saying that Toriko has been trying to ring Fuwari all day to tell her her new brand is ready. Everyone heads over to Prism Stone where Cosmo and Meganee reveal the CoCo Flower brand designed for her. Cosmo gives Fuwari her own PriTicket and upon scanning it enters Pripara in her new outfit. Fuwari's debut ends with her ranking up to debut class idol and gaining the green natural Cyalume Charm.
53	15	"E~veryone's on a PriPara Prohibition Order"; Transliteration: "Mi~nna puripara kinshi meirei" (Japanese: み～んなプリパラ禁止命令)	July 11, 2015
Laala wakes up from a nightmare, where she dreams that Pripara has been closed. Upon arriving at Prism Stone, the girls discover it deserted but are still able to enter the Pripara world by scanning their tickets. With encouragement from Dorothy, Laala bravely faces the mascots and discovers Kuma, Usagi and Neko were playing a trick. Falulu also appears via video link from Paris, France where she has been living since leaving Japan. The party ends with a performance from SoLaMi♡SMILE, and Cosmo reveals she has updated everyone's Cyalume Coords.
54	16	"The Devil's Museum ~kuma!" Transliteration: "Akuma no myūjiamu ~kuma!" (Japanese: あくまのミュージアムクマ！)	July 18, 2015
Both Solami Smile and Dressing Pafé want Fuwari to join their dream team, but so does Aroma and with Neko's help she plans to eliminate the competition, and the reopening of the Pripara Museum just might give them the means to do it. Everyone then receives mysterious invitations to a museum in Pripara and they decide to check it out. Although their plan failed, Aroma becomes inspired to create a new making drama. Fuwari also hopes that her own making drama will be just as impressive.
55	17	"The Prince, a Goat, Date and Me"; Transliteration: "Purinsu to yagi to dēto to watashi" (Japanese: プリンスとヤギとデートと私)	July 25, 2015
The Summer Idol Grand Prix is fast approaching and everyone is excited. Fuwari voices her concerns and is overheard by Hibiki's butler, Andou. Hibiki, worried Fuwari is losing heart, decides to take her out on a date, buying her a new dress, then taking her to dinner and dancing. Hibiki encourages Fuwari to do her best at becoming a princess and gives her a pair of purple glass slippers.
56	18	"Run! Summer Dream Grand Prix!"; Transliteration: "Hashire! Samadoriguranpuri!" (Japanese: 走れ！サマドリグランプリ！)	August 1, 2015
A group of four top ranking idols called Celebrity 4 arrive in Japan from Europara planning to enter the Summer Idol Grand Prix. The idol group approaches Fuwari and ask her to join them to form a dream team. Although Fuwari politely refuses the girls don't take no for an answer, and after one of them hits Toriko, Fuwari runs away from them. Finding Laala and the others, she asks to form a dream team with Dressing Pafé and Laala because they had so much fun the other day together. As they are interviewed by Meganii, Hibiki switches off the TV in annoyance.
57	19	"What's a Genius, panda?" Transliteration: "Jīniasu tte Nani, panda?" (Japanese: ジーニアスって何パンダ？)	August 8, 2015
Fuwari prepares to leave Paprika Private Academy for home, but Solami Smile and Dressing Pafé confront her and beg her not to go. However, the others decide to ask Hibiki to reconsider and let Fuwari stay. Ando prevents them from entering Hibiki's office so they force their way in. Hibiki agrees to hear them out and after pleading with him to let Fuwari stay he agrees. Everyone gathers at the Dream Theater and Dressing Flower perform a concert.
58	20	"Falulu has Come Back"; Transliteration: "Kaettekita Faruru dechu~" (Japanese: かえってきたファルルでちゅ)	August 15, 2015
As a bright pink light appears in the sky, Solami Smile and Dressing Pafé assume it to be Pegasus, but it turns out to be the landing light for a helicopter which lands on the rooftop helipad. Unicorn appears at the door, having assumed her original form to everyone's surprise, and announces Falulu's arrival. Everyone returns to the rooftop helipad and Falulu begins to say goodbye as her miniatures board the helicopter. But just as the helicopter is about to take off, Falulu realizes that Gaaruru is missing.
59	21	"Fair, Sometimes Gaaruru"; Transliteration: "Hare Tokidoki Gaaruru" (Japanese: はれときどきガァルル)	August 22, 2015
Unicorn and the mini Falulus leave Pripara by helicopter, while Falulu stays behind to find Gaaruru. Kuma spots Gaaruru using some binoculars and everyone begins to chase her down. Falulu reveals that Gaaruru always seemed to distance herself from her and the other miniatures, even refusing to watch Falulu perform. Falulu begins to feel downcast but Laala and Mirei cheer her up. The performance makes Gaaruru smile and, afterwards, she expresses her gratitude to Sophy and apologizes for misbehaving.
60	22	"It's Summer! MAX Love at the Pool!"; Transliteration: "Natsu da! Pūru de Rabu MAX!" (Japanese: 夏だ！プールでラブMAX！)	August 29, 2015
Dorothy and the others are still upset over the Thieving Genius stealing the Summer Dream Parade Coord, so they decide to go to the pool and have fun with their friends. On the way, they notice Amamiya is also following Love. They are suddenly interrupted by Hibiki who is playing tennis on his private court opposite the bench. Hibiki asks what they're doing, but quickly changes the subject when Dorothy mentions they are looking for the Thieving Genius. As the sun sets, Hibiki is seem in his penthouse, viewing the diorama of the Dream Theater. He holds a model of Sophy in his hand that he hopes will satisfy his needs for his dream team.
61	23	"Cool Scandal☆I'll Gladly Oblige"; Transliteration: "Kūru Sukyandaru ☆ kyōshuku desu" (Japanese: クールスキャンダル☆恐縮です)	September 5, 2015
As Sophy leaves for school, she enters the elevator, only for it to go up to the penthouse suite before going to the lobby. Hibiki steps in and Sophy, surprised, greets him in the appropriate manner. Sophy goes to Pripara and approaches Meganee at the performance registration desk. Mirei and Laala become shocked, but Meganee reluctantly agrees and registers them. She also notices the unnatural sparkle in Sophy's eyes and gives a look of concern. Hibiki places the model Sophy in the Dream Theater diorama with the model Falulu.
62	24	"Sion VS Hibiki"; Transliteration: "Shion VS Hibiki" (Japanese: シオンVSひびき)	September 12, 2015
At school, everyone is talking when Sion is approached by Andou, who gives her a letter from Hibiki, asking her to meet him after school. Sion decides to go through with the request although she doesn't understand why Hibiki would want to see her. The others think that Hibiki has sent Sion a love letter and plan to secretly follow her to find out if Hibiki is in love with her. The next day, she performs her very first solo live with her own song and making drama, and manages to rank up.
63	25	"Friends Tickets Will Save the World"; Transliteration: "Tomochike wa Sekai wo Sukuu" (Japanese: トモチケは世界を救う)	September 19, 2015
Everyone is still upset over the Thieving Genius, so SoLaMi♡SMILE and Dressing Pafé decide to hold an event in Pripara to boost everyone's spirits. The event involves a friend ticket exchange with the members of each team and their fans, the goal of which is to get enough tickets to cover the front of the PriPara Hills building within 24.5 hours. Hibiki, frustrated he was unable to find anymore candidates for his dream team, turns his attention to stopping Laala ruining his plans.
64	26	"Ham and Ajimi"; Transliteration: "Hamu to Ajimi" (Japanese: ハムとあじみ)	September 26, 2015
Everyone arrives at Pripara and is greeted by Meganii, who informs that he has created a Pripara Police department in order to catch the Thieving Genius. As Meganii leaves, a new idol introduces herself as Ajimi Kiki. However, their meeting is interrupted by an announcement from Meganii, who has discovered a clue supposedly left by the Thieving Genius. It is Ajimi who ends up solving the puzzle by discovering the seeds are sunflower seeds dropped by a hamster mascot. The next day, Gloria introduces the new art teacher to Paprika Private Academy, who is none other than Ajimi.
65	27	"Da Vinci Coord"; Transliteration: "Da Vinchi Kōde" (Japanese: ダ・ヴィンチ・コーデ)	October 5, 2015
Ajimi begins her first day at Paprika Private Academy, but her mind appears to be on other things. After attempting to arrest the headmistress for being the thieving genius, Gloria reprimands her and reveals she is also supposed to be designing a Coord for the Autumn Dream Idol Grand Prix, and that she will be working with Cosmo Hojo.
66	28	"The Terra-cosmic Autumn Grand Prix!"; Transliteration: "Aki no Tera Kozumikku Guran Puri!" (Japanese: 秋のテラコズミックグランプリ！)	October 12, 2015
Laala, Dorothy and Mikan form a compatible dream team with Ajimi and Cosmo called Cosmic Omurice da Vinci, but are worried about what the others will say. Meanwhile, Fuwari is seen at the school with Non helping her goat to give birth to three baby goats. During the after-performance interview, the mascots reveal that if no team is able to win the Princess Coords, the Dream Parade will be cancelled, shocking Laala and the other members of Cosmic Omurice da Vinci. The Thieving Genius then appears, but does not steal the Coord.
67	29	"What's a Mega Genius, panda?" Transliteration: "Mega jīniasutte Nani panda?" (Japanese: めがジーニアスって何パンダ？)	October 19, 2015
Laala is about to give the PriTickets containing the Coord to Meganii for safekeeping but a second Meganii appears. Unable to determine who is the real Meganii, Laala accidentally gives the Coord to the imposter, who reveals himself as the Thieving Genius. Laala manages to track down the thief and apparently corners him in an elevator with Mirei and Sion.
68	30	"Heya! Happy Halloween ~nya" Transliteration: "Hora! Happī Harouin ~nya" (Japanese: ほら～！ハッピーハロウィンにゃ)	October 26, 2015
It's Halloween in Pripara, but everyone is struggling to enjoy the festivities, because the Thieving Genius has managed to steal the second Princess Coord. An old friend of Laala named Ran appears, and Laala mistakes her as a ghost. Meganii announces there will be a competition, where the girl who manages to scare the most people will be crowned Miss Halloween. Ran becomes overjoyed and dances around before suddenly disappearing, causing everyone to run off screaming thinking she is a ghost. It is revealed that Ran had fallen into a giant pumpkin.
69	31	"The Dangerous PriPara Police, Holler at the Forefront"; Transliteration: "Abunai Puripara Porisu Saizensen ni Hoero" (Japanese: あぶないプリパラポリス最前線にほえろ)	November 2, 2015
Hibiki begins contemplating Laala's ability as an idol, remembering how she awoke the prism voice to revive Falulu. He then goes to watch SoLaMi Smile performing in PriPara, disguised as the Genius, but is spotted by one of the audience members who yells out causing everyone to look at him. Hibiki manages to escape and Ajimi is becoming frustrated as she has been unable to think of a way of catching the Genius.
70	32	"Princess Falulu" (Japanese: プリンセス・ファルル)	November 9, 2015
Falulu returns to Parajuku Pripara to participate in the Dream Parade, and Gaaruru has snuck off to join her, much to Unicorn's dismay. Falulu begins various activities around Pripara, including a meet and greet event where she officially gets introduced to Aroma, Mikan and Fuwari. Falulu then performs her live, where she ranks up to the Top idol rank.
71	33	"A Birthday Promise, Capisce!"; Transliteration: "Tanjōbi no Yakusoku, Kashikoma!" (Japanese: 誕生日の約束、かしこまっ！)	November 16, 2015
It is Laala's birthday and everyone plans to help her host a special birthday performance at the Dream Theater. Laala also reveals that she shares her birthday with her best friend, Nao. During the event, Laala is overwhelmed by fans wishing her happy birthday, and Nao who tried to give Laala her present is pushed aside. Hibiki, who had been watching the days events, takes the model Laala and throws it into another bin, vowing to get rid of Laala once and for all.
72	34	"Capisce Mystery: The PriPara Serial da Vinci Incidents"; Transliteration: "Kashikoma Misuterī Puripara Renzoku Da Vinchi Jiken" (Japanese: かしこまミステリー プリパラ連続ダ・ヴィンチ事件)	November 23, 2015
Hibiki continues to see Falulu during their latest meeting Falulu comments on the stars in the sky. The next day, Gloria is horrified to discover that Rina is injured and unconscious. The Pripara Police turn up to investigate as Ajimi suspects foul play. Rina appears to have left a clue, a figure eight, in drool on the floor. Hibiki's butler, Andou, voices his concerns that Hibiki's identity as the Genius may be at risk. Andou rushes to tell Hibiki that the secret entrance into Pripara has been discovered, but Hibiki just smiles and looks at the Dream Theater diorama.
73	35	"Her Debut Date"; Transliteration: "Kanojo ga Debyū suru Hi" (Japanese: 彼女がデビューする日)	November 30, 2015
After discovering the secret entrance to Pripara, everyone finds evidence that Hibiki is the culprit. Kuma and Usagi inform Meganii who rushes back to Pripara, while everyone else sets a trap for Hibiki. However, when Hibiki turns up, he walks into Prism Stone instead of the secret hideout. Hibiki then drops another bombshell, he is in fact a girl! Meganii reluctantly gives Hibiki a Cyalume Charm with a golden crown on, she then performs her encore. Note: From this point on, Hibiki is referred to as female.
74	36	"Shikyōin Hibiki's Splendid Everyday Life"; Transliteration: "Shikyōin Hibiki no Karei naru Nichijō" (Japanese: 紫京院ひびきの華麗なる日常)	December 7, 2015
As the shock of Hibiki's revelation begins to sink in across the world, Hibiki continues her life as a celebrity both inside and outside of Pripara. Meganii decides to disband the Pripara Police now that the Genius has been revealed, much to the dismay of Ajimi. Laala and friends are still in awe of Hibiki but everyone decides to do their best in the upcoming competition.
75	37	"Going・My Way"; Transliteration: "Igōingu・My Way" (Japanese: イゴーイング・マイウェイ)	December 14, 2015
While walking to school, Sophy tells Mirei and Laala about the meeting with Hibiki, which Nene Tokuda overhears. The girls ask the West twins about Sion, who say she is busy contemplating the offer. Sophy is then harassed by Nene Tokuda and her reporters, but the Royal guard step in and scare them off allowing the girls to flee. Later that day, Hibiki is looking at the Dream Theater Diorama, where she has placed a model of herself in the lead position.
76	38	"Happy Bye-Bye Xmas, nano" Transliteration: "Happī Baibai X masu ~nano" (Japanese: ハッピーバイバイXマスなの)	December 21, 2015
As Laala, Mikan and Aroma chat about the upcoming Christmas Live, in which both SoLaMi Dressing and Aromageddon will be performing, they overhear crying coming from the nearby play park. Upon investigation they discover Anko and Milk, the two preschool children they had met earlier in the year. Milk tells Laala and the others that Anko is moving away soon, so the girls try to cheer them up. Miruku gives Anko her christmas present early, a pair of mittens with each girl's face on a separate mitten. After both SoLaMi Dressing and Aromageddon perform, many Cyalume Charms begin to react in the audience as dream teams are formed. Laala, Mikan, and Aroma also go to see Miruku as she waves goodbye to Anko.
77	39	"Showdown! Winter Grand Prix"; Transliteration: "Taiketsu! Uintā Guran Puri" (Japanese: 対決！ウィンターグランプリ)	January 4, 2016
Laala sends a message to Fuwari telling her about the events leading up to the Winter Idol Grand Prix, before joining Mirei, Aroma, Dorothy and Reona to begin training. Laala's team wish Sion, Falulu, Sophy and Mikan good luck as Hibiki takes them up to a room in PriPara Hills. Laala's team performs first, but is unable to Cyalume Change into the Winter Dream Parade Coord. Hibiki's team, Celepara Opera Company, takes their turn and manage to win the Coord and ring the winter bell. As Meganii losts the bet with Hibiki, he reluctantly hands over his glasses to her. Hibiki then announces that Pripara will be renamed Celepara and begins planning her rule over the world of idols.
78	40	"Let's・Go! CelePara!!"; Transliteration: "Rettsu・Gō! Serepara!!" (Japanese: レッツ・ゴー！セレパラ！！)	January 11, 2016
As Laala, Mirei, Dorothy, Reona and Aroma express their disappointment at losing the Winter Idol Grand Prix, Hibiki makes an announcement on Pripara TV about the reformation of Pripara to Celepara. The idols decide to go to Celepara and find out what Hibiki has planned. They are shocked to discover that Hibiki turns PriPara Hills into a giant castle that dominates the park. Hibiki, who has been watching everything from Meganii's control room, dumps Mikan's idol model from the Dream Theater Diorama into the fool bin.
79	41	"Idol End ~pri" Transliteration: "Aidoru Shūryō Puri" (Japanese: アイドル終了ぷり)	January 18, 2016
Laala, Mirei, Dorothy, and Reona are shocked to discover they are no longer eligible to perform lives. Hibiki then makes an announcement about the restructure of Pripara to Celepara, where only idols of top rank and above are eligible to perform lives. Meganee fills in for the performance, after which she makes the official announcement for the Spring Idol Grand Prix, and all the top idols begin expressing their excitement at trying to win it. Despite protests from all the other idols, Mirei decides to quit being an idol and leaves Pripara.
80	42	"Pop・Step・Gaaruru!" (Japanese: ポップ・ステップ・ガァルル！)	January 25, 2016
A mysterious new idol named Gaaruru appears, and she is revealed to be Falulu's sister. Everyone heads out towards Neko's bar, where Meganii and the mascots have been spending a lot of time since Hibiki's takeover. Meganii leaves to put some of his things in the trash when he sees Laala and the others coming. As Gaaruru performs, she falls over a number of times but gets back up and continues, something Mirei takes note of. At the end of her performance, Gaaruru gains the pink lovely Cyalume Charm with golden wings. Mirei also comes to realize the importance of not giving up and, after thanking Gaaruru, decides to return to being an idol. Sophy and Sion also announce that they have quit Hibiki's dream team, but Mirei tells them not to.
81	43	"I Became an Underground Idol"; Transliteration: "Chika Aidoru Hajimemashita" (Japanese: 地下アイドル始めました)	February 1, 2016
Laala and the others start handing out leaflets to try and promote the new found underground stage where all idols are allowed to perform. An old friend of Laala named Hanana appears and takes a leaflet before being dragged off to a Celepara performance by some friends. Laala then suggests Hanana perform, where Hanana's confidence grows from the support of the others and makes her debut. Meanwhile, Fuwari is back in the Palps living happily with her goats, but her grandfather thinks that she misses being an idol. After bumping into the old gardener and explaining who she is, she asks if her friend still lives here. The gardener reveals that Ajimi's friend is in Japan.
82	44	"Gaarumageddon's Devitine's Day"; Transliteration: "Gaarumagedon no Debitain Dei" (Japanese: ガァルマゲドンのデビタインデー)	February 8, 2016
Aroma and the other idols plan to sabotage Celepara's Valentine's Day event and host their own event in the underground stage. The next day, Mirei goes to visit Hibiki about the Spring idol Grand Prix. Meanwhile, Fuwari sets off for her return to Japan from her home in the Palps. As Laala and the others begin preparing for Valentine Day, Hibiki announces the start of the Celepara Valentine day event. Ajimi goes into joyous hysterics explaining who she is and that she has been looking for Hibiki and that she remembers being childhood friends. Hibiki, realizing who Ajimi is, becomes equally hysterical and begins freaking out. Andou hangs up the phone and Hibiki regains her composure before becoming maniacal and vowing to make sure Ajimi doesn't undo all her hard work.
83	45	"Kurukuru-chan of Persailles da Vinci"; Transliteration: "Perusaiyu no Kurukuru-chan da Vinchi!" (Japanese: ベルサイユのくるくるちゃんダヴィンチ！)	February 15, 2016
Hibiki barricades herself inside the Celepara Palace in preparation for Ajimi's arrival. Meanwhile Fuwari is on her way back to Japan, when she bumps into Ajimi at a connecting airport and the two decide to head back to Japan together. Upon returning to Pripara, both Ajimi and Fuwari are amazed at how much has changed. Gaaruru performs a farewell concert before returning to PriParis. After leaving the Celepara palace to investigate, Hibiki is confronted by the Thieving Genius.
84	46	"Pop・Step・PriPriPri!"; Transliteration: "Poppu・Suteppu・PuriPuriPuri!" (Japanese: ポップ・ステップ・ぷりぷりぷり!)	February 22, 2016
Hibiki chases the Thieving Genius, revealed to be Kaito Natural Fuwari. However, Hibiki is still angry at Fuwari, and tosses it in the lake only for Fuwari to reply that it won't be destroyed. Meanwhile, Meganee starts a rain storm to keep Ajimi from scaling the castle walls. While Reona believes that maybe Hibiki isn't a bad person, Dorothy disagrees. Meanwhile, Laala talks to Falulu and asks her about Hibiki wanting to become a vocal doll which Falulu seems happy about.
85	47	"The Revenge Of Celebrity 4"; Transliteration: "Gyakushū no sereburiti 4" (Japanese: 逆襲のセレブリティ4)	February 29, 2016
Celebrity 4 return to Parajuku to ask Hibiki if one of them may have the final spot on her dream team. Hibiki however turns them down saying she has already asked Reona West, before dismissing them. Celebrity 4 decide to force Reona to drop out of the dream team. Meanwhile Meganii gives Reona a new Pripass, and afterwards, Reona tells Dorothy about Hibiki's offer. The twins then perform a live with their own song, Twin Mirror Compact. At the end, a large crack appears in the Celepara Palace.
86	48	"Win, Spring Grand Prix!"; Transliteration: "Tsukame, Haru no Guran Puri!" (Japanese: つかめ、春のグランプリ！)	March 7, 2016
As everyone prepares for the Spring Idol Grand Prix, Laala has concerns about Hibiki. When Mirei asks Laala what's wrong, Laala tells Mirei she really wants to save Hibiki from making a terrible mistake in wanting to become a vocal doll. Meanwhile, Hibiki is determined to win the Grand Prix but only Falulu appears excited at the prospect. As the system crashes, the Celepara palace crumbles to dust and the park shuts down, trapping everyone inside.
87	49	"The End of Gobi"; Transliteration: "Gobi no Hate" (Japanese: 語尾の果て)	March 14, 2016
As the Pripara system crashes, Laala is saved by the Dream Parade Princess Coord, which deposits her at the entrance of Pripara. She bumps into Eiko, but is surprised when Eiko greets her so formally. Laala and Mirei then come up with a plan to get everyone to remember being friends. Both idols take Sophy to the roof stage on the newly reformed Pripara Hills Tower and sing 'Love Friend Style'. When Laala and Mirei sing, Sophy begins to remember and joins in followed by Sion, Dorothy and Reona. Soon all the idols start to remember and begin cheering for the idol group.
88	50	"Ring the Bell of Miracle!"; Transliteration: "Kiseki no Kane o Narase!" (Japanese: キセキの鐘をならせ！)	March 21, 2016
All the idols in Pripara are excited that Pripara is back to normal but begin to wonder where Hibiki, Fuwari and Ajimi have disappeared to. Meganii meets with Laala, Dorothy, Mirei, Aroma, and Mikan outside the Dream Theater and explains that each member of the team must each wear a separate princess coord. During the final song, a reprise of "Around the Pripara land", all thirteen idols, including Cosmo, airy change into the various princess coords they have won.
89	51	"Everyone's Friends! Everyone's an Idol!"; Transliteration: "Mi~nna Tomodachi! Mi~nna Aidoru!" (Japanese: み～んなトモダチ！み～んなアイドル！)	March 28, 2016
Hibiki announces to Paprika Private Academy that she will be leaving to go to Europara. Laala and the others decide to invite her to a going away party in Pripara, which will also serve as a birthday party for her. Hibiki then appears on stage dressed as a girl, which causes Andou to get distracted. Hibiki forgives Andou and reinstates him as her butler. Afterwards, Meganii is seen attending a conference in Pripara.

=== Season 3 (2016-17) ===
No. in series	No. in season	Title	Original air date
90	1	"I Became a Divine Idol?!"; Transliteration: "Kami Aidoru Hajimechaimashita?!" (Japanese: 神アイドル始めちゃいました！？)	April 5, 2016
While heading to Pripara, Laala sees a girl named Chili hanging around outside Prism Stone. Laala takes Chili into Pripara, and, after the initial shock of finding out who Laala really is, Chili is introduced to Mirei and Sophy. SoLaMi Smile then perform a Live for Laala's new friend, after which Dressing Pafe show up and perform followed by Aromageddon. Laala then notices a strange light in the sky and follows it to a wooded area where she sees a baby falling from the sky. Laala catches the baby, who opens her eyes and calls Laala her mother.
91	2	"I Became a Mama Idol?!"; Transliteration: "Mama Aidoru Hajimechaimashita?!" (Japanese: ママアイドル始めちゃいました！？)	April 12, 2016
Laala is shocked at the sudden appearance of a baby, who begins to think Laala is her mother. She decides to try to find the real mother, but has trouble keeping the baby from crying. As everyone talks about the Divine Idol Grand Prix. The baby then says something Laala takes to be her name, so Laala decides to call her Jewlulu, while a mysterious girl watches Laala from nearby.
92	3	"The Superior Cool Butterfly"; Transliteration: "Chouzetsu Kuuru Chou Batafurai" (Japanese: ちょう絶クール蝶(バタフライ))	April 19, 2016
Laala is still trying to take care of Jewlulu, but is struggling to cope. Non tells her she must keep Jewlulu a secret, but Laala wonders if it would be best to tell someone. At school. Laala tries to tell Mirei and Dressing Pafe but keeps getting interrupted by Nene Tokuda. Meganee then announces the new idol, named Junon. Everyone attends the performance and are amazed at how Junon jumps straight from the bottom of the student rank to the top of the debut rank. While being interviewed, Junon is part of a team called Triangle and introduces one of her teammates, Pinon, via video link. She also introduces her manager, who turns out to be Usagi's little sister Usacha. Pinon and Junon then announce they plan to compete against SoLaMi Smile.
93	4	"Jewlulu's Great Adventure"; Transliteration: "Jururu no Daibouken" (Japanese: ジュルルの大冒険)	April 26, 2016
Laala is still struggling to look after Jewlulu. When she gets the chance. Laala tries to sneak home to get Jewlulu. but is stopped by Mirei. Laala considers telling Mirei about Jewlulu, but is interrupted by Non who brings out a TV to show the debut of Pinon, the second member of Triangle. After school Laala spots Jewlulu riding a cat and chases after her, all over Parajuku. After the performance Laala is suddenly transported to the Divine Idol Stage where she meets Jewlie. Meganii explains what happened and that Laala received Super Cyalume Coord.
94	5	"Come on, come on ・ Kanon!"; Transliteration: "Kamon Kamon ・ Kanon!" (Japanese: カモンカモン・かのん！)	May 3, 2016
Laala reveals Jewlulu to Mirei, Sophy, Dressing Pafe and Gaarmageddon but Meganii surprises them all by revealing Jewlulu is Jewlie. Meganii informs them of Jewlie's importance, and, seeing how attached she has become to Laala, asks her to continue to look after her. The next day, Usacha introduces the last member of Triangle, Kanon. She proceeds to follow them around during the day, before making her début.
95	6	"Perfect Mama Mirei!"; Transliteration: "Kanpeki Mama Mirei" (Japanese: かんぺきママみれぃ！)	May 10, 2016
Mirei believes that Jewlulu is being spoiled too much and decides to take her turn in looking after her. The next day at school, Laala notices how tired Mirei looks, but Mirei shakes it off. After even more disasters at school Mirei returns home and begins to lose her self-confidence, starting to cry in front of Jewlulu. Mirei's mother comforts her, saying about how it isnever easy to look after a baby, because even Mirei's parents struggled with her at first. Laala and Sophy come to lend Mirei a hand, and eventually Mirei and Jewlulu are able to get along. In Pripara, SoLaMi Smile perform a Live, after which Mirei receives a Super Cyalume Coord.
96	7	"I Had Enough of Aromat Cards!"; Transliteration: "Aromatto Kādo de Mō Taihen!" (Japanese: アロマットカードでモーたいへん！)	May 17, 2016
Aroma is determined to find out the secret to receiving a Super Cyalume Coord and consults her own brand of tarot cards to decide what to do. The next day, Aroma, Mikan, and Gaaruru sneak into SoLaMi Smile's training practice to speak with Jewlulu. Aroma convinces Laala to let them take care of Jewlulu and Laala agrees despite Mirei's protest. Gaaruru then uses a monster program to create a slide for Jewlulu, but Gaaruru becomes over excited and uses the hologramation control to produce farm animals all over Pripara. Luckily, Meganee manages to stop Gaaruru before she causes too much damage. Aroma and Mikan see how happy Jewlulu has become and perform a live with Gaaruru in the hopes of entering the Divine Idol Stage.
97	8	"Super Miracle Delicious Peach"; Transliteration: "Sūpā Mirakuru Umee Pīchi" (Japanese: スーパーミラクルうめぇピーチ)	May 24, 2016
Sophy then finds out from Kuma about a super miracle peach, which might help Jewlulu. Sophy goes on a quest to find the peach with Jewlulu and ends up in Palifornia. Laala, Mirei and Cosmo travel to Palifornia to rescue Sophy and see her father. As everyone is leaving Pripara, it is revealed that Kanon is secretly Lazla's little sister, Non.
98	9	"Playing Three Roles Alone Is Hard!"; Transliteration: "Hitori Sanyaku wa Taihen na non!" (Japanese: ひとり三役は大変なのん！)	May 31, 2016
Meganee makes an announcement about the Divine Idol Grand Prix, with SoLaMi Smile and Dressing Pafe vowing to come out on top. Kanon, whose secret identity has been revealed as Non Manaka, also plans to enter the Grand Prix. She and Usacha both meet at their secret hideout, where they recall how they first met. With the help of two small hologram projection spheres, Usacha is able to project 3D holograms of Junon and Pinon. Triangle makes their debut, and are taken to the Divine Idol Stage afterwards.
99	10	"Youth Jumpin' Snappin'!"; Transliteration: "Seishun Janpin Sunappin!" (Japanese: 青春ジャンピンスナッピン！)	June 7, 2016
With Triangle's recent success on the Divine Idol Stage, Dressing Pafe is determined to receive their own Super Cyalume Coords. After receiving a new song from Meganii, Sion, Reona and Dorothy decide to go to a training camp at the beach. Dorothy also decides to bring Jewlulu along despite protest from Sion that they need to focus on their new making drama. Back in Pripara, Dressing Pafe perform their new song and drama, after which Sion and Reona are taken to the Divine Idol Stage to receive Super Cyalume Coords.
100	11	"Tension 100 MAX!"; Transliteration: "Tenshon 100 MAX da yo!!" (Japanese: テンション100MAXだよ！)	June 14, 2016
Dorothy is still upset over not receiving a Super Cyalume Coord, and blames Jewlulu. However, Sion tells her it's her own fault for not taking care of Jewlulu properly. In Pripara, Laala and the others decide to leave Dorothy to look after Jewlulu alone. Jewlulu transports herself into the compact and Dorothy reconciles with her before being released. Dorothy thanks Jewlulu and Dressing Pafe perform a Live. Note - The characters celebrate the 100th episode of the series.
101	12	"It has come! The Divine Idol Grand Prix!"; Transliteration: "Kita! Kami Aidoru Guran Puri!" (Japanese: キタ！神アイドルグランプリ！)	June 21, 2016
The first round of the Divine Idol Grand Prix is about to start with Dressing Pafe, SoLaMi Smile, and Triangle competing for the Divine Idol Headdress. Kanon also drops her Priticket, which Laala picks up, to discover she is really her sister Non. After Non explains herself, she changes her appearance to something more resembling herself. Although the others are a little surprised at her, they still believe her to be a worthy opponent. Both Non and Usacha both decide to continue to try and form the perfect team to take on SoLaMi Smile and Dressing Pafe.
102	13	"Ever-changing Appearance! Jewel Change~poyo"; Transliteration: "Hengen jizai! Jueru Chenji poyo" (Japanese: 変幻自在！ジュエルチェンジぽよ)	June 28, 2016
Laala receives a call from Hibiki, who has arranged for a film director to make a film starring Laala and her friends, as a present for winning the first round of the Divine Idol Grand Prix. The next day at Pripara all the idols wait for the arrival of the director, who turns out to be a large cylinder shaped robot who looks like Meganee. The robot introduces herself as Mechanee, who is a first generation Meganee. It is revealed that Hibiki arranged the event as a joke, with Fuwari revealing the Mechanee is actually a terrible director.
103	14	"I've Become a Failed Idol"; Transliteration: "Rakudai aidoru hajimechaimashita" (Japanese: 落第アイドル始めちゃいました)	July 5, 2016
Headmistress Gloria comes round to Laala's house to have a chat with Laala and her mother Himeka about her grades. Gloria tells Laala that if her grades don't improve, she will not be allowed to attend PriPara. Laala begs Gloria to let her keep Jewlulu and still attend Pripara, to which she agrees after seeing how much Jewlulu responds to Laala. SoLaMi Smile then perform using their new Super Cyalume Coords. Afterwards, Himeka agrees to help Laala look after Jewlulu at home.
104	15	"LOVE! Devil Color! With Magic, the Devil can do anything!" Transliteration: "LOVE! Debiru-iro! Maryoku ga arebe nandemo debiru!" (Japanese: LOVE！デビル色！魔力があればなんでもデビル！)	July 12, 2016
To celebrate the 222nd anniversary of Pripara, Meganii from PriParis wants to create a special coord to mark the occasion, and asks the idols of Parajuku to submit their own ideas for the coord. Aroma decides to enter and spends all night designing the coord she thinks is worthy of being chosen. PriParis Meganii officially announces Aroma as the winner and the Coord is sold at every Pripara around the world.
105	16	"Gaaruru, wake up!!" Transliteration: "Gaaruru, mezameru dechu!!" (Japanese: ガァルル、目覚めるでちゅーっ！！)	July 19, 2016
Gaaruru wants to form a team with Aroma and Mikan, but Unicorn refuses to let her. Unicorn reminds Gaaruru that because she is a vocal doll her Priticket contains all her data, and snapping it would corrupt that data and cause Gaaruru to fall into a coma, which once happened to Falulu. Despite this Gaaruru still wants to try and Aroma and Mikan support her. The ceremony is complete and Gaarmageddon perform their first performance as a team, after which Jululu sends Gaaruru to the Divine Idol Stage to receive a super Cyalume Coord.
106	17	"The Divine Idol Grand Prix is Over"; Transliteration: "Kami aidoru guran puri shuuryou desu" (Japanese: 神アイドルグランプリ終了です)	July 26, 2016
PriParis Meganii tells Laala and the others and asks that she hands over Jewlulu. The other idols defend Laala and Jewlulu until Parajuku Meganii steps in, and fights his PriParis counterpart. After the performance, everyone is taken to the Divine Idol Stage, where Jewlie reveals the second part of the Divine Idol Coord, the Divine Skirt. Jewlulu makes another unexpected appearance, but thanks to Laala's quick thinking, manages to convince everyone she belongs to PriParis Meganii, who reluctantly admits to it. The Meganii's both agree that the Divine Idol Grand Prix can continue.
107	18	"Emergency meeting! It's a talented manager, kuma!" Transliteration: "Kinkyū kaigi! Binwan manējā da Kuma!" (Japanese: 緊急会議！びんわんマネージャーだクマ！)	August 2, 2016
Kuma and the other managers hold a meeting to discuss the Divine Idol Grand Prix. Each manager voice their opinions on how to make the Parajuku Divine Idol Grand Prix the best there has ever been. In the end, the managers decide that everyone is equally good and as long as everyone is having fun it doesn't matter what they do. Toriko also announces that Hibiki, Fuwari and Falulu will be arriving soon for their team forming ceremony.
108	19	"PriParis has come back" Transliteration: "Kaette kita PuriPari" (Japanese: 帰ってきたプリパリ)	August 9, 2016
Hibiki, Falulu, and Fuwari return to Parajuku to particcipate in the Divine Idol Grand Prix. After meeting with their friends and exchanging gifts, Hibiki announces their intent to form a team. At the team forming ceremony, it is revealed that Hibiki, Fuwari and Falulu's team name is TriColore and Toriko is their manager. Jewlulu rebuffs all of Hibiki's attempts, until Fuwari decides they should perform their duet live for Jewlulu.
109	20	"SOS from Sapannah"; Transliteration: "Sapanna kara SOS" (Japanese: サパンナからSOS)	August 16, 2016
Laala finds a bottle containing a message from Sapannah Pripara, and asks the others to take a boat trip to Sapannah. They meet a girl who they initially mistake for Hanana, but she introduces herself as Panana. Mirei feels surprised to see a person who looks like Amamiya, but it turns out to be a girl called Amiya, who is Panana's friend. Panana goes and gets Amiya and brings her to the stage where they watch performances by SoLaMi Smile, Dressing Pafe and Fuwari. The performances reinspire all the girls in Sapannah to become idols and Sapannah Pripara becomes popular again.
110	21	"Swimming Tournament-pri! Go!"; Transliteration: "Suiei taikai puri! Igo!" (Japanese: 水泳大会ぷり!イゴ!)	August 23, 2016
Meganii decides to hold a summer tournament for everyone to enjoy. SoLaMi Smile, Dressing Pafe and Gaarmageddon take part in various contests to decide who will get to perform at the end of the day. Meanwhile Non decides it is the perfect opportunity to look for team members for Triangle, but doesn't have much success. At the end of the tournament both SoLaMi smile and Dressing Pafe are declared the winners and each perform a live.
111	22	"Babysitter Thief Maho-chan"; Transliteration: "Kodzure kaitō Maho-chan" (Japanese: 子連れ怪盗まほちゃん)	August 30, 2016
Hibiki is still determined to get a Super Cyalume Coord, but her attempts to impress Jewlulu continue to fail. In an attempt to stop Jewlulu crying, Hibiki learns of a pacifier which once belonged to an ancient queen. When the other idols learn of Hibiki's plans, Meganii recruits Mikan, Laala and Dorothy back into the Pripara Police to stop Hibiki. However, after the duet, Falulu receives a Super Cyalume Coord, leaving Hibiki even more humiliated and angry with Jewlulu.
112	23	"Love Love Jewlulu"; Transliteration: "Koi Koi Jururu" (Japanese: 恋恋ジュルル)	September 6, 2016
As Jewlulu continues to grow and develop, Laala, Mirei, and Sophy decide to spend with Jewlulu and take her to the park. While at the park, Laala bumps into some of her friends, who all seem to be having trouble with their love lives, which they try to resolve. This gives Sophy an idea for a new drama, which SoLaMi Smile perform at their next live, to raucous applause. Meanwhile, Non is still looking for people to join her idol team, but doesn't have much luck.
113	24	"Frizzy Chili-chan!"; Transliteration: "Chirichiri Chiri-chan" (Japanese: ちりちりちりちゃん)	September 13, 2016
The third part of Divine Idol Grand Prix is announced, and the winner will reveal the Divine Shoes. Meanwhile, Chili is excited about the events in Pripara, but has been reluctant to return since the Divine Idol Grand Prix started. Non then performs as Triangle again, after which Chili is supposed to make her début, but she decides to leave PriPara instead. Back at home, Chili, who is back to normal, begins to wonder if she will ever be able to go back to Pripara again.
114	25	"Hurry up! Divine Idol Grand Prix!"; Transliteration: "Isoge! Kami Aidoru Guran Puri!" (Japanese: 急げ！神アイドルグランプリ！)	September 20, 2016
The third round of the Divine Idol Grand Prix is about to start, with SoLaMi Smile, Dressing Pafe and Gaarmageddon ready to take the stage. Unfortunately, Hibiki, Fuwari, and Falulu are not able to register, because Hibiki hasn't been able to say her vows for the team forming ceremony, nor has she managed to receive a Super Cyalume Coord. Unicorn scolds Hibiki and attempts to punish Hibiki with her horn, but Andou steps in the way to save Hibiki and in turn is saved by a friend ticket he received from his goat friend. Afterwards, Hibiki finally receives her Super Cyalume Coord and TriColore is able to register for the Divine Idol Grand Prix.
115	26	"Resound! Divine Idol Grand Prix!"; Transliteration: "Hibike! Kami Aidoru Guran Puri!" (Japanese: ひびけ！神アイドルグランプリ！)	September 27, 2016
Now that TriColore have qualified for the Divine Idol Grand Prix, both Fuwari and Falulu are in a hurry to take the stage. SoLaMi Smile and Dressing Pafe both take the stage to perform, followed finally by TriColore, with Non and Chili watching excitedly from the audience. Meganii calls on Jewlie to announce the winner. Afterwards, Non congratulates Fuwari and Falulu, while Chili asks Hibiki to form a team together, to which Hibiki politely refuses.
116	27	"The Missing Managers! The Mysterious Girl from Sapannah"; Transliteration: "Kieta Manējā! Nazo no Sapanna Shōjo" (Japanese: 消えたマネージャー！謎のサパンナ少女)	October 4, 2016
As Hibiki, Falulu and Fuwari leave Parajuku to return to PriParis, something mysterious begins happening around Pripara. Inside the cave, Laala and her friends find a savage girl about to eat Usacha. When they attempt to talk to the girl, she thinks they are animals too, and attacks them, but stops when she thinks Reona is a lion. The girl then introduces herself as Pepper Taiyo and says her lioness mother sent her to Pripara from Sapannah to learn new things. As they leave Pripara, Non sees Chili as her timid self for the first time, and is surprised by her.
117	28	"The Goddess Becomes an Idol"; Transliteration: "Megami, Aidoru Hajimechaimashita" (Japanese: 女神、アイドル始めちゃいました)	October 11, 2016
Non cannot believe that Chili and her Pripara ego are the same person. Chili apologizes for her behavior and Non excitedly drags her back to Pripara. As Jewlie wonders why they've been brought to the stage, the mysterious person in Chili's compact appears and everyone is surprised to see she looks like Jewlie. However, Jewlie smiles at her.
118	29	"The Big Sister, Little Sister, Princess and the Beast"; Transliteration: "Ane to Imōto to Hime to Yajū" (Japanese: 姉と妹と姫と野獣)	October 18, 2016
As everyone wonders why there are now two divine idols, Jewlie introduces the other idol as her sister Janis. Janis then goes on to explain that Jewlie and herself were supposed to remain in the Divine Idol Stage, but Jewlie began sneaking down to Pripara to watch idols. Meanwhile, Meganii attends a conference in PriParis about the developments in Parajuku.
119	30	"Look~! Hallomageddon Nya"; Transliteration: "Hora~! Haromagedon Nya" (Japanese: ほら～！ハロマゲドンにゃ)	October 25, 2016
It's Halloween in Pripara, and Meganii announces the start of the Halloween Stamp Rally, where the idols must make their way through a giant pumpkin castle to the performance registration desk. However, Gaaromageddon manages to reach the control room where they find Ran. Ran explains that Meganii asked her to create frightening creations. Afterwards, Jewlie takes them to the Divine Idol stage where they receive special team Coords, and Gaaromageddon is left to clean up their mess once again.
120	31	"Don't Be Sweet, NonSugar!"; Transliteration: "Amaku wa Ikanai Non Shugā" (Japanese: 甘くはいかないノンシュガー)	November 1, 2016
As the fourth round of the Divine Idol Grand Prix draws near, Non and Chili begin to grow impatient, because they still haven't formed a team with anyone. Chili suddenly receives inspiration for a bouquet, which impresses her grandmother. The person reveals herself to be Chili's Grandmother who has become younger upon entering Pripara. Chili agrees to accept her promise and NonSugar make their debut. Afterwards, however, Chili expresses her disappointment at not receiving a Super Cyalume Coord.
121	32	"Awakening! The Goddess' Dress Design"; Transliteration: "Mezame yo! Megami no Doresu Dezain" (Japanese: めざめよ！女神のドレスデザイン)	November 8, 2016
Dressing Pafe discover Cosmo in a distressed state at the Pripara cafe. When asked what's wrong, Cosmo tells them she is having trouble designing new coords. Ajimi then makes a surprise announcement with Meganii that Pripara is getting a Dress Maker, which will allow all idols to create their own coords. All idols become excited; and when the Dress maker opens, everyone enthusiastically begins designing their own coords. Afterwards, they are taken to the Divine Idol Stage where they receive special team Coords.
122	33	"Capisce for Sister!"; Transliteration: "Shimai de kashikoma!" (Japanese: 姉妹でかしこまっ！)	November 15, 2016
As Laala and Nao celebrate their birthday, Nao asks Laala what she wants for her birthday this year. Meanwhile, Non is still stressing out over her team with Pepper and Chili and how they don't appear to fit with her idea of the perfect team. Non is so engrossed in her competitiveness she forgets to get Laala a present. That afternoon, Laala's parents, Non, Mirei and Sophy all celebrate Laala's birthday with her when she arrives home.
123	34	"NonSugar Drifting"; Transliteration: "NonShugā Hyōryūki" (Japanese: ノンシュガー漂流記)	November 22, 2016
Non is worried that Pepper and Chili will never get along for them to receive Super Cyalume Coords. When Non finds a flyer advertising a team building competition in Pripara, she sees it as the perfect opportunity to get Pepper and Chili to bond. Non tries her best, but storms off into the jungle in tears, wishing that Chili and Pepper would just get along. NonSugar then performs a live, with Chili and Pepper finally receiving Super Cyalume Coords, meaning they can enter the next Divine Idol Grand Prix.
124	35	"Jewlie and Janis"; Transliteration: "Jurī to Janisu" (Japanese: ジュリィとジャニス)	November 29, 2016
Nonsugar is training when Janis comes out of her compact before leaving to find Jewlie. Jewlie trains with SoLaMi Smile and Dressing Pafe, who are in awe of her sparkle as a Divine Idol. Jewlie then decides to go to the cafe and invites everyone around Pripara. Jewlie then performs a live before returning to her compact. Later, Janis confides in Chili that she must gain control of the Grand Prix.
125	36	"Let's Live! The Main Character Of Course to You!"; Transliteration: "Rettsu・Raibu! Shuyaku wa Mochiron Kimisa!" (Japanese: レッツ・ライブ！主役はもちろん君さ！)	December 6, 2016
Meganii announces the fourth Divine Idol Grand Prix will take place on Christmas day, and everyone becomes excited. All of the idols in Pripara, including many of Laala's friends begin forming teams in the hope of receiving Super Cyalume Coords and the chance to compete in the Grand Prix. Some teams are successful while other are not so lucky. SoLaMi Smile also perform a live and receive another Special Team Coord from Jewlie. Meanwhile Janis is still trying to convince Chili to go ahead with her plan but Chili is reluctant.
126	37	"Merry・Grand Prix!"; Transliteration: "Merī Guranpuri!" (Japanese: メリー・グランプリ！)	December 13, 2016
The fourth round of the Divine Idol Grand Prix begins and everyone is excited. All teams that have qualified are set to take the stage, except NonSugar, who is missing a member. Chili decides to tell the truth, and reveals Janis' plan to take control of the Grand Prix from Jewlie. Just as everyone begins to worry, NonSugar arrive in time to perform.
127	38	"Grand Prix is not so Simple, ucha" Transliteration: "Guranpuri wa Amakunai ~ucha" (Japanese: グランプリは甘くないウチャ)	December 20, 2016
NonSugar make it in time for the Grand Prix, but Usacha tells them they need to come up with a making drama to perform during their live. Janis also reveals herself and once again attempts to convince Chili to help her, but she refuses. After the Grand Prix, Meganii reveals that all the winning teams will face off to decide who will become Divine Idols, and the runner-up teams will also have one last chance to enter the contest. Later, Janis speaks to NonSugar, admitting her mistakes before leaving.
128	39	"Goodbye Usacha..."; Transliteration: "Sayonara Usacha..." (Japanese: さよならウサチャ・・・)	December 27, 2016
Laala is thrilled that her sister has won a Divine Idol Grand Prix, but Non suddenly remembers the promise Usacha made to Pepper and tells Lzala. The two sisters invite Pepper over to dinner to distract her, so she won't remember the promise, but fail. Meanwhile, Usacha prepares to fulfill her promise but is interrupted by Kuma and Usagi, who realise what she is doing and stop her, but Usacha runs off to try again. The mascots are later joined by Non, Chili and SoLaMi Smile to find Pepper and Usacha. Janis turns to leave, but Non and Chili convince her to stay, before NonSugar perform a live.
129	40	"Everyone's Chance!? The Revenge Live!"; Transliteration: "Mi~nna ni Chansu!? Ribenji Raibu!" (Japanese: み～んなにチャンス！？リベンジライブ！)	January 10, 2017
Jewlie has a dream, in which she sees the Cyalume Baton float away from her before she begins to disappear. She also sees an image of Laala growing more distant and wakes up crying. Laala calms her down, but Jewlulu becomes desperately attached to Laala and tries to speak to her. Afterwards, the audience is still confused about who Janis was and what was going on, but Laala and the others have no explanation. Back at home, Laala is with Jewlulu, who finally starts to speak and tells Laala she loves her.
130	41	"The Goddess' Feelings, Mama's Oath"; Transliteration: "Megami no Omoi, Mama no Chikai" (Japanese: 女神の想い、ママの誓い)	January 17, 2017
Laala wakes up to find Jewlulu gone, but an announcement by Meganee on Pripara TV tells Laala that Jewlie has appeared in Pripara. Laala and her friends rush to find out what is going on and discover Jewlie has decided to perform. After the performance, Jewlie begins to address the crowd when Janis shows up, and demands she hands over the Cyalume Baton. Back in Pripara, Laala refuses to accept that Jewlie will disappear and vows to find a way to save her.
131	42	"Heaven and Hell? The Night Before the Decisive Battle!"; Transliteration: "Tengoku to Jigoku? Kessen Zenya!" (Japanese: 天国と地獄？決戦前夜！)	January 24, 2017
The finale of the Divine Idol Grand Prix is about to come, and it's time to decide which teams face each other. Meganii reveals that the tournament line-up will be decided by a lottery with a member of each team choosing a numbered ball from a box Meganee provides. Meganii takes everyone to the Divine Idol Stage to begin, where they are greeted by Jewlie and Janis.
132	43	"The Great Decisive Battle of Rockin・Gaajira"; Transliteration: "Rokkin・Gaajira Dai Kessen" (Japanese: ロッキン・ガァジラ大決戦)	January 31, 2017
Round 1 of Divine Idol Grand Prix tournament features Dressing Pafe vs. Gaaromageddon. Both teams decide they need a new making drama but while Dressing Pafe take the challenge seriously, but Gaaromageddon decide to play pranks on them instead. Dressing Pafe performs and are declared the winners, but Meganii reveals that the Divine Idol Coord is still completely trapped in crystal, meaning the performances where not exciting enough to release part of it. Afterwards, Gaaromageddon lament on their loss, but decide to keep supporting their friends.
133	44	"Beyond the Endings"; Transliteration: "Gobi no Kanata" (Japanese: 語尾の彼方)	February 7, 2017
Hibiki begins practicing for the start of Tricolore's and Ucchari BigBang's turn in the tournament. As Tricolore is due to take the stage, everyone comes to wish them luck only to find Hibiki unconscious. When Andou explains that Hibiki cannot handle people using sentence enders, Ajimi bursts into tears horrified she has caused Hibiki so much pain. The results are announced and Tricolore win by a fraction.
134	45	"Valentine's Day is not Sweet"; Transliteration: "Barentain wa Amakunai" (Japanese: バレンタインは甘くない)	February 14, 2017
The third round of the tournament is set to begin, with SoLaMi Smile beating NonSugar. It's also Valentine's Day in Pripara and Pepper gets a surprise from Sapannah, her lioness mother has come to watch her perform in the tournament. The third round begins and Usacha chooses NonSugar to go first. As the winner is decided, SoLaMi Smile are shown to be the clear winners, Non congratulates her sister before bursting into tears. Meganii reassures everyone that there is still time to free it.
135	46	"Smile 0%" (Japanese: スマイル0%)	February 21, 2017
The semifinal round of the Divine Idol Grand Prix tournament begins with Tricolore going first. The idol group go all out to impress their fans, performing four consecutive making dramas. SoLaMi Smile perform three making dramas before Super Cyalume changing and performing a fourth making drama. Afterwards, Meganii asks everyone to vote and announces the winner. Laala, Mirei and Sophy cannot believe it and Hibiki, Fuwari and Falulu congratulate them. The final round of the tournament sees SoLaMi Smile face off against Dressing Pafe.
136	47	"Three Years of Iron Plate"; Transliteration: "Sannenme no Teppan" (Japanese: 3年目のテッパン)	February 28, 2017
The final of the Divine Idol Grand Prix tournament is just around the corner. While leaving her house for Pripara, Laala finds Dorothy at her restaurant, Mirei meets Sion in Pripara and Sophy bumps into Reona while out jogging. Everyone discusses their time as idols with each other before meeting up in Pripara for lunch. Both teams decide to perform a live together.
137	48	"The Decisive Battle! Divine Idol"; Transliteration: "Kessen! Kami Aidoru" (Japanese: 決戦！神アイドル)	March 7, 2017
The finale of the Divine Idol Tournament has arrived, with SoLaMi Smile and Dressing Pafe preparing to face each other for a place in Pripara history. After a parade through Pripara town, everyone is taken to the Divine Idol stage. Once both teams finish performing, Meganii tallies the votes but it is discovered that both teams have tied. Jewlie and Janis both congratulate SoLaMi Smile, but reveal the tournament is not yet over.
138	49	"Is it Born!? The Divine Idol!"; Transliteration: "Tanjō!? Kami Aidoru!" (Japanese: 誕生！？神アイドル！)	March 14, 2017
Jewlie and Janis reveal that in order for SoLaMi Smile to win the tournament, they must face off against the Goddesses. Jewlie and Janis perform a duet of "Girl Fantasy", leaving the audience in awe. The Grand Prix draws to a close but as Laala goes to thank Jewlie, and unusual storm knocks her back. Before disappearing, Janis manages to throw the Cyalume Baton to Laala.
139	50	"I Friend You"; Transliteration: "Ai Furendo Yū" (Japanese: 愛フレンド友)	March 21, 2017
With the Goddesses gone and the system falling into chaos, Meganii asks SoLaMi Smile to use the power of their Divine Coords to help repair the damage and save the day. As Laala panics, Jewlie states that the system reset will delete her because the emotional attachment she developed with Laala caused so much trouble. Jewlie tells Laala not to worry as she will be reborn as a new goddess, until then Janis will watch over PriPara from the Divine Idol Stage. Jewlie disappears and Janis returns to the heavens with the Divine Idol Stage, while Laala and her friends thank them.
140	51	"Everyone~ are Friends! Friends For~ever!"; Transliteration: "Mi~nna Tomodachi! Zu~tto Tomodachi!" (Japanese: み～んなトモダチ！ず～っとトモダチ！)	March 28, 2017
Laala continues her life as an idol, but is still troubled over Jewlie. As Unicorn starts to scold Laala, Falulu finds a present for her from Jewlie, a Paprika Private Academy Primary school uniform. The other idols continue to work hard in Pripara, but Sion makes a surprise announcement that she is leaving her idol activities for now to pursue other goals, which leaves Dorothy and Reona a little upset. One day, Headmistress Gloria calls Laala into her office and reveals she has something important for Laala to do, which shocks Laala.
