= Autumn darter =

Conservation status
- Least Concern (IUCN 3.1)

Scientific classification
- Kingdom: Animalia
- Phylum: Chordata
- Class: Actinopterygii
- Order: Perciformes
- Family: Percidae
- Genus: Etheostoma
- Species: E. autumnale

Binomial name
- Etheostoma autumnale (Mayden, 2010)

Species of fish

The Autumn darter (Etheostoma autumnale) is a species of freshwater ray-finned fish, a darter from the subfamily Etheostomatinae, part of the family Percidae, which also contains the perches, ruffes and pikeperches. It is endemic to the eastern United States, where it commonly occurs in the White River drainage and tributaries, and less so in the upper Current and Eleven Point Rivers, of Missouri and Arkansas, and the Little Red River in Arkansas.
