= Yui Watanabe =

Japanese voice actress

- 渡部 優衣
- Born: December 4, 1988 (age 37); Minoh, Osaka Prefecture, Japan
- Occupations: Voice actress; singer
- Years active: 2007–present
- Agent: Kenyu Office
- Height: 167 cm (5 ft 6 in)
- Website: yuiwatanabe.com

Yui Watanabe (渡部 優衣, Watanabe Yui; born December 4, 1988) is a Japanese voice actress and singer affiliated with the talent agency Kenyu Office.

Watanabe was born in Saitama, Japan. She became interested in voice acting while in high school. After graduating high school in 2007, she attended Nihon Kogakuin College and majored in art planning.

== Filmography ==
=== Anime ===
- 30-sai no Hoken Taiiku - Macaron
- Chikasugi Idol Akae-chan - Akae
- Engaged to the Unidentified - Akane Yonomori
- Ketsuekigata-kun! Featuring Yuri & Nasuno - Yuri Oshimoto
- KiraKira Pretty Cure A La Mode - Crystal Pegasus
- Long Riders! - Emi Kurata
- Mawaru Penguindrum - Hibari Isora
- PriPara - Mikan Shiratama
- Teekyu - Yuri Oshimoto
- Yuru Yuri - San☆Hai!
- Million Doll - Momona
- Nyuru Nyuru!!Kakusen-Kun 2 - Niyuru-Nyan
- Uma Musume Pretty Derby - Winning Ticket
- Code Geass: Rozé of the Recapture - Sokkia Sherpa
- Wandance - Hitomi Shimoda

=== Video games ===
- The Idolmaster Million Live! - Nao Yokoyama
- Umamusume: Pretty Derby - Winning Ticket
- Girlfriend Kari - Rui Kamijo
- Shooting Girl - B&T APC9 SMG
- Miko No Mori - Sumiyoshi Hiroka
