= Cait Sith =

Cait Sith is an alternate name for Cat-sìth, a type of fairy in Scottish mythology.

Cait Sith may also refer to:

- Cait Sith (Final Fantasy), a cat robot protagonist introduced in Final Fantasy VII
- Regal Feline Cait Sith, a character introduced in Final Fantasy XI
- Cait Sith (Boarding School Juliet), the head prefect of the "White Cats Dormitory" in Boarding School Juliet
- Cait Sith, a demon/Persona in the Megami Tensei franchise
