= List of Boarding School Juliet characters =

This article covers the characters of a Japanese manga series Boarding School Juliet (寄宿学校のジュリエット, Kishuku Gakkō no Jurietto).

== Main characters ==
Romio Inuzuka (犬塚 露壬雄, Inuzuka Romio)
Voiced by: Yūki Ono, Yū Shimamura (young)
The leader of 1st Year High School division of the "Black Dogs". He has been in love with Juliet since their childhood and has always secretly protected her during the group's war. He is a romantic when it comes to dating Juliet and is often timid when making advances. However, he will always confront problems head-on, especially regarding Juliet or fellow students. Whilst physically strong, he struggles with his studies and is unable to swim.
He used to be a servant under Teria's care whilst aiming to become one of the "Black Dog's" prefects. At the start of the new term, he was the leader of 2nd Year High School division of the "Black Dogs". After his temporary amnesia, his relationship with Juliet has progressed, now addressing each other by their first names. After the prefect elections, he is chosen to be the "Black Dogs" Head Prefect.
Juliet Persia (ジュリエット・ペルシア, Jurietto Perushia)
Voiced by: Ai Kayano
The leader of the 1st Year High School division of the "White Cats". She is the only daughter of the Persia household, a high ranking noble family from the West. Since only males can inherit the rank of nobility, the household is at risk of losing its noble status. This and her constant confrontations with Romio during childhood motivates Juliet to become stronger so that her strength and intelligence are no less than that of a man. After being attacked by Maru and his friends, she initially mistakes Romio's protection of her as pity for being a woman and has been harboring animosity towards him until he confessed his love.
Throughout the series, her feelings towards Romio grow, to the point when she can confidently express her love for him in front of others. Her cooking skill also grows, although she can currently only bake cookies. When going out with Romio publicly, she goes undercover as a "Black Dog" Middle School boy named Julio (ジュリ男, Jurio).
She used to be a servant under Sieber's care and formerly held the leader position of the 2nd Year High School division of the "White Cats" at the start of the new term. After Romio's temporary amnesia, her relationship with Romio has progressed, now addressing each other by their first names. After the prefect elections, she is chosen to be the "White Cats" Head Prefect.
Hasuki Komai (狛井 蓮季, Komai Hasuki)
Voiced by: Ayane Sakura
Romio's right hand and childhood friend. Initially timid and withdrawn as a child, she meets Romio when he praises her for her intellect after assisting him with his homework. Her interaction with Romio made her become more outgoing and passionate with others by the start of the series. She is grateful for Romio's friendship and as a result, falls in love with him. She is the only one on the "Black Dogs" side to know about Romio and Juliet's relationship, after Romio confesses the truth to her. While she initially disapproved, Romio convinces her to keep his relationship with Juliet a secret.
She currently ranks 2nd overall in terms of academics for the 1st year, only behind Juliet. Because of her academic prowess, she often runs intense tutoring sessions to prevent her fellow "Black Dogs" from failing, especially Romio. She also has a younger brother named Kōgi.
She used to be a servant under Kochou's care and is currently a prefect, serving as the Vice Deputy Treasurer of the Student Council.
Chartreux Westia (シャルトリュー・ウェスティア, Sharutoryu Wesutia)
Voiced by: Yū Shimamura
Nicknamed Char, she is Juliet's best friend and is the First Princess of the West. She is one of few people who knows about her relationship with Romio. As children, Juliet always stayed by Char's side, causing Char to become extremely protective of her. She initially blackmails Romio to prevent him from making plans with Juliet. Whilst she disapproves of Juliet's relationship, she realizes how Juliet's cares for Romio and the joy their relationship brings to her. However, she continues to keep track of their relationship, often eavesdropping on them from a far distance.
She is considered very demanding and is usually the center of attention of those in the "White Cats". She also enjoys teasing others, with Scott usually being the main victim of her pranks.
Kochō Wang (王 胡蝶, Wan Kochō)
Voiced by: Rina Hidaka
One of the 2nd year prefects of the "Black Dogs" dormitory, and Teria's elder twin sister. She is known as the Pharmacy expert, with expertise regarding medicines. Despite their small stature, they are actually 14 years old, having skipped grades because of their intellect. Kochou is the more outgoing of the twins. It is hinted she has feelings for Airu Inuzuka, and affectionately calls him "A-chan."
She served as Hasuki's master within the Student Council before the prefect elections. She steps down from her Student Council duties after Hasuki's inauguration.
Teria Wang (王 手李亞, Wan Teria)
Voiced by: Yui Ogura
One of the two-second-year prefects of the "Black Dogs" dormitory, and Kochou's younger twin sister. She is known as the Engineering expert, with expertise regarding machinery. Despite their small stature, they are actually 14 years old, having skipped grades because of their intellect. However, Teria only joined so that she could be by her sister's side. Teria is shy and timid but is willing to step up to the challenge to help others. As Romio continues to help her, Teria falls in love with him and is pushed by her sister to be more proactive with him.
She served as Romio's master within the Student Council before the prefect elections. Like Kochō, she also steps down from her Student Council duties and is currently undertaking an Engineering course at Touwa University.
Scott Fold (スコット・フォールド, Sukotto Fōrudo)
Voiced by: Hiroshi Kamiya, Rina Hidaka (young)
Juliet's right hand man. A fellow 1st Year, he is in love with Juliet, having apparently been saved by her in the past. As a result, he is often seen stalking Juliet, often tracking her from distance. More recently, he has become a target of Chartreux's sadistic tendencies.
He used to be a servant under Rex's care and is currently a prefect within the Student Council.

== Dahlia Academy Students ==
=== Black Dogs House ===
Chizuru Maru (丸流 千鶴, Maru Chizuru)
Voiced by: Tomokazu Sugita
One of the three delinquents of the "Black Dogs". He is described as an extremist for the "Black Dog's" cause, despising the "White Cats". He, Tosa, and Kohitsuji tried to assault Juliet when she was alone, but Romio saved her, sparking the events that led to Romio confessing his love for Juliet. He dislikes Romio and is very reluctant to help others. Throughout the series, Maru befriends Juliet's "Black Dog" alter ego, "Julio", and eventually learned her gender though he doesn't know "Julio" is Juliet in disguise.
During the prefect elections, treasuring his friendship with Julio, he decides to ally himself with Romio and Juliet after learning about their relationship and Julio's true identity.
Kento Tosa (土佐 健斗, Tosa Kento)
Voiced by: Yoshimasa Hosoya
One of the three delinquents of the "Black Dogs". He is considered the dimwitted one of the group.
Eigo Kohitsuji (古羊 英悟, Kohitsuji Eigo)
Voiced by: Hiro Shimono
One of the three delinquents of the "Black Dogs". He is the more perverted one of the group, often sharing his pornographic magazines with others.
Airu Inuzuka (犬塚 藍瑠, Inuzuka Airu)
Voiced by: Daisuke Ono
Romio's older brother, and the Head Prefect for the "Black Dogs" dormitory. A 2nd year student, he is serious and strict with the "Black Dogs", especially his brother. He is also the head of the Inuzuka household after his father's passing, and does everything he could to prevent the Inuzuka name from being tarnished. However, he does showcase acts of kindness, particularly towards his family.
During the holidays, he learns of Julio's identity and the relationship between Romio and Juliet. This leads into a final confrontation with Romio, resulting in Airu's defeat and revealing his admiration for Romio's determination to change the world. He reluctantly accepts Juliet as his sister-in-law, but insists they remain cautious about their relationship.
He served as Leon's master within the Student Council before the prefect elections. He steps down from his role as head prefect after Romio's inauguration.
Shūna Inuzuka (犬塚 朱奈, Inuzuka Shūna)
A 15-year-old member of a branch of the Inuzuka family and serves as the family's guardian. She is said by Hasuki to be the "Watchdog of the Inuzuka House", and is considered to be a master in the handling of Touwa's weaponry, especially the Naginata. She also has strong domestic skills and often assists with performing household chores.
Initially accepting into the household from a young age, she views Romio has an older brother figure. As a result, she becomes very aggressive and will stop at nothing to hunt those who threaten Romio. It is hinted that she also holds feelings for Romio.
She begins to attend Dahlia Boarding School as a 1st Year student after her parents' recommendation. After assisting with Romio's school trip proposal, she aims to become one of the school's prefects.
Leon Inugami (狗神 玲音, Inugami Reon)
A member of the "Black Dogs" and a childhood acquaintance of Romio and Hasuki. She wants to maintain the animosity between the "White Cats" and the "Black Dogs" and supports the segregation of two factions. Born to a Western mother and Touwan father, her hatred towards the "White Cats" derives from the trauma of her parents' separation at a young age. Throughout the series, she develops a hatred towards Romio for his desire to coexist with the "White Cats".
During the elections, she creates an incident which leads to injuring Sieber and revealing Romio and Juliet's relationship to the student body. However, with Romio and Juliet's resolve, one students after another begins to ally themselves with the couple, leading to Leon's defeat. While she initially intended to dropout from Dahlia Academy, she participates in the follow-up election to determine the final "Black Dog" prefect after Romio's persuasion. By revealing her background to the student body, she was able to regain their trust and comfortably win the election.
She is currently the General Affairs Manager for the "Black Dogs" in the Student Council.
Kōgi Komai (狛井 晃葵, Komai Kougi)
The leader of the Middle School Division of the "Black Dogs" and Hasuki's little brother. A 3rd year Middle School student, he holds a strong demeanor despite his small stature. He is very protective of his older sister and will hunt those who dare wrong her, especially Romio.
He succeeds Romio during the new term and is currently the leader of the 1st Year High School division of the "Black Dogs".
Shizuka Shishi (獅子 静香, Shishi Shizuka)
Voiced by: Riho Iida
One of Hasuki's good friends.
Nia Pomera (歩米良 仁愛, Pomera Nia)
Voiced by: Kaede Hondo
One of Hasuki's good friends.
Black Dog's House Master (ブラックドギーハウスマスター, Burakku Dogii Hausumasutaa)
Voiced by: Takaya Kuroda
The headmaster of the "Black Dog's" house. He is shy when speaking in public and often speaks in an indistinguishable voice. However, he will speak clearly when insulting the "White Cats" housemistress.

=== White Cats House ===
Aby Ssinia (アビ・シニア, Abi Shinia)
Voiced by: Shinnosuke Tachibana
A 1st year student and a popular figure within the "White Cats". Initially hailing from a lower status background, he was bullied as a child together with Somali. He aims to become a prefect to prove his worth and earn the admiration of others. To this end, he resorted to underhanded tactics throughout the Sports Festival in order to defeat both Romio and Juliet, whose popularity threatens his goal. He believes he's the only one who can keep up with Somali's antics.
He used to be a servant under Cait's care and is currently a prefect within the Student Council.
Somali Longhaired (ソマリ・ロングヘアード, Somari Ronguheādo)
Voiced by: Eri Kitamura
A 1st year student, Somali possesses superhuman strength and has a happy-go-lucky attitude. She was bullied by fellow classmates when she was younger together with Aby. As a result, she also sought to become a prefect and takes orders from Aby, no matter how underhanded they are. She cares deeply for Aby and aims to becoming a woman fit for him. She's not as condescending as most other "White Cats" members are toward the "Black Dogs" and seems to be aware of the relationship between Romio and Juliet.
She was initially Rex's servant before stepping aside for Scott.
Cait Sith (ケット シィ, Ketto Shii)
Voiced by: Kazuyuki Okitsu
A 2nd year and the head prefect of the "White Cats Dormitory". He has a relaxed attitude toward student matters and is a fan of perverse humor. As a result, he is often at the end of Sieber's discipline. However, he is very perceptive and becomes serious if the situation calls for it, as shown when Sieber was wounded during the elections.
He formerly served as Aby's master within the Student Council and has stepped down from his Student Council duties after Juliet's inauguration.
Anne Sieber (アン・サイベル, An Saiberu)
Voiced by: Sumire Uesaka
The secretary for the "White Cats" side of the student council and one of the prefects. A 2nd year student, she is strict and uncompromising, and values hard work and dedication from others. She has a weakness towards things she deems as cute.
She formerly served as Juliet's master within the Student Council and has stepped down from her Student Council duties.
Journey Rex (ジャーニー・レックス, Jānī Rekkusu)
Voiced by: Takanori Hoshino
A 2nd year student and one of the "White Cats" prefects. A very muscular man, Rex has an obsession of wanting to be both strong and cute at the same time. Because of this, he often dresses in female clothing. He will not tolerate those who make fun of his appearance and has great respect for those who live up to his beliefs.
He formerly served as Scott's master within the Student Council and has stepped down from his Student Council duties.
Amelia Kurl (アメリア・カール, Ameria Kāru)
A student introduced during the new term and is Juliet's junior. She is also the daughter of the "White Cats" housemistress. She succeeds Juliet's position and is currently the leader of the 1st Year High School division of the "White Cats". She likes to dress in gyaru-style clothing, which is against her mother's wishes. She affectionately refers to Juliet as "Juli".
White Cats Housemistress (ホワイトキャッツハウスミストレス, Howaito Kyattsu Hausumisutoresu)
Voiced by: Akiko Kimura
The headmistress of the "White Cats" house and Amelia's mother. She holds high discipline and will silence those who disturb student's guidance. While she often retains a calm demeanor in public, she will act vulgarly and trade insults when provoked, especially with the "Black Dog's" housemaster. Her full name is Annie Kurl (アニー・カール, Anī Kāru).

== Other characters ==
Ragdoll Persia (ラグドール・ペルシア, Ragudōru Perushia)
Juliet's mother and an alumna of Dahlia Academy. She is a very strict individual but deeply cares for her daughter's wellbeing. She acts in a tsundere manner when addressing Juliet. She is also a famous actress in the West.
Chiwa Inuzuka (犬塚 千和, Inuzuka Chiwa)
Romio's mother and a former student of Dahlia Academy. She has an airheaded personality but is goodwilled, caring deeply for her family. She was in a romantic relationship with Turkish during high school but was shunned once their relationship was made public. As a result, her relationship ended and she was forced to leave the academy. However, she no regrets about her relationship and continues to cherish those memories. Before leaving the academy, she had left an exchange diary together with Turkish, which would later be discovered by Juliet.
Turkish Persia (ターキッシュ・ペルシア, Tākisshu Perusia)
Voiced by: Eiji Takemoto
Juliet's father and a nobleman of the West. He acts coldly towards his daughter as she strives to gain his approval. It is revealed he once had a romantic relationship with Chiwa during high school but was forced to break up and leave the academy.
