= The Classroom of a Black Cat and a Witch =

Japanese manga series

- First tankōbon volume cover, featuring Claude Sirius (left) and Spica Virgo (right)

黒猫と魔女の教室 (Kuroneko to Majo no Kyōshitsu)
- Genre: Fantasy; Romantic comedy
- Manga
- Written by: Yōsuke Kaneda
- Published by: Kodansha
- English publisher: Kodansha (digital)
- Imprint: Shōnen Magazine Comics
- Magazine: Magazine Pocket
- Original run: March 16, 2022 – present
- Volumes: 16
- Anime television series
- Directed by: Naoyuki Tatsuwa
- Produced by: Ruriko Kikuchi; Kouichirou Tomita; Yoshiyuki Shioya; Tomohiro Shibata; Kyouhei Nishikawa; Hiroyasu Katou
- Written by: Midori Gotō
- Music by: R.O.N
- Studio: Liden Films
- Licensed by: Crunchyroll: SEA: Medialink
- Original network: JNN (CBC TV, TBS), AT-X, BS12 TwellV
- Original run: April 12, 2026 – September 20, 2026
- Episodes: 24
- icon

The Classroom of a Black Cat and a Witch (Japanese: 黒猫と魔女の教室, Hepburn: Kuroneko to Majo no Kyōshitsu) is a Japanese manga series written and illustrated by Yōsuke Kaneda. It has been serialized on Kodansha's Magazine Pocket website and app since March 2022. An anime television series adaptation, produced by Liden Films, aired from April to September 2026.

== Plot ==
Spica Virgo is a budding witch who admires Claude Sirius, a skilled wizard and teacher who mysteriously vanished one day. However, due to her clumsiness and lack of skills, she feels it is difficult to fulfill her dream of entering Royal Diana Academy, a prestigious magic school where Claude was once a teacher. One day, she encounters a black cat. She is surprised that the cat can talk and asks it for help in entering the academy. After learning that the cat was formerly human but was cursed to have this form, Spica aims to undo the curse. She learns that she has "Rebirth Magic", which gives her the power of regeneration, and that she can undo the curse by kissing the cat's butt. She does so reluctantly, leading the cat to reveal itself to be Claude. With this, Spica enters the academy, with Claude becoming her teacher, with Claude still maintaining a cat form as Spica's magic remains too weak to lift the curse fully.

== Characters ==
=== Royal Diana Academy ===
==== Students ====
===== Pandoras' Box =====
The Coven of Students taught by Claude Sirius at Royal Diana Academy. They are 12 students with potential, but are also misfits in their own ways.

Spica Virgo (スピカ・ヴァルゴ, Supika Varugo)
Voiced by: Kaede Hondo (Japanese); Veronica Laux (English)
Spica is the main protagonist of the series. She has admired Claude Sirius ever since he saved her during an attack. She comes from a large family of eight. She was able to temporarily lift the curse on Claude so he could appear in human form, although her magic powers remain too weak to make him return to being a human permanently. After their meeting, Spica becomes Claude's apprentice. As a Virgo Mage, she has the ability to manipulate plant life, letting her grow or revitalize any form of nature. She also possesses the rare Rebirth Magic, which is vital for Claude to maintain his human form, and is the main point of contention for The Black Serpents.
Aria Aquarius (アリア・アクエリアス, Aria Akueriasu)
Voiced by: Fūka Izumi (Japanese); Corey Pettit (English)
A classmate and childhood friend friend of Spica. Widely regarded as a magic prodigy, she is very confident in her abilities and often has fun at Spica's expense. Nevertheless though, she cares deeply for Spica as well as her other classmates, showing compassion along with her immense talent. As an Aquarius Mage, her magic grants her control over water. Her high level skill with her magic allows her to blast powerful streams of water and even freeze it into blocks of ice. Although the two are friends, the two saw themselves as rivals during their final exam at Aspidochelone Island.
Io Taurus (イオ・トーラス, Io Tōrasu)
Voiced by: Haruka Shiraishi
A classmate of Spica. She is a soft-spoken and empathetic, though she is also very airheaded and clumsy. While she typically tries to avoid conflict, when her classmates are threatened or hurt, she becomes frighteningly aggressive. Despite this, she always tries her best to help people. Her Taurus magic centers around the physical enhancement of one's own body. Her signature spell enables her to alter her physical size and grow into a giant, with her maximum height being 10 meters tall, bigger than most other users of her magic. She also naturally possesses superhuman strength, being able to lift most heavy objects with ease; though she doesn't know her own strength at times due to her clumsy nature.
Astraea Libra (アストレア・ライブラ, Asutorea Raibura)
Voiced by: Tomohiro Ōno
A classmate of Spica and the son of the vice-headmaster. Astraea is a flirtatious man who can't resist girls, choosing a type based on personality rather than age or appearance alone. Still, he shows quite a lot of devotion. His Libra Magic grants him Psychic abilities, giving him heightened awareness and letting him do things like dodge attacks even with his eyes closed.
Castor Gemini (カストル・ジェミニ, Kasutoru Jemini)
Voiced by: Yūto Uemura
A classmate of Spica. He is brash, hot-headed, and confrontational whenever someone makes an advance on his twin sister Pollux, who he shares a body with. He emerges whenever a man touches their body. He loves punk rock and has a secret minor admiration for Lolita styles. His Gemini Magic allows him to create a perfect mirror doppelganger of himself, though he is severely lacking in magical talent.
Pollux Gemini (ポルックス・ジェミニ, Porukkusu Jemini)
Voiced by: Rena Hasegawa
A classmate of Spica. Compared to her twin brother Castor, with whom she shares a body with, Pollux is more friendlier and charismatic, but is also bold and tomboyish with a soft spot for cute things. She emerges whenever a female touches their shared body. She specializes in the same magic as her brother, but is more adept with it, able to create perfect copies of any clothes she scans and fire a powerful blast of light.
Leo Regulus (レオ・レグルス, Reo Regurusu)
Voiced by: Fairouz Ai
A classmate of Spica. Hailing from a wealthy family, Leo possesses a free spirit and a desire to be the center of attention, so she regularly does things to make her stand out. She adores animals, along with anything flashy and physical activity, hence her highly athletic physique. A wielder of Leo Magic, she possesses the ability to transform into various animal hybrid forms that enhance her already impressive abilities.
Capella Capricorn (カペラ・カプリコーン, Kapera Kapurikōn)
Voiced by: Miyuki Sakurai
A classmate of Spica. A perfectionist by nature, Capella always keeps a cool head and everything under control, including her own classmates, being able to put them back in order with only a few strict words. She is also quite the formidable strategist, coming up with plans that afford victory every time. But underneath her cool exterior is a gentle soul that cares for many, and it is for all those reasons she was chosen to be Coven Leader by her classmates. However, one mention of the word "serious", especially when others call her that, can easily set her off. Her Capricorn Magic is able to consume and dispel any magic used on her. Its not an offensive spell, so she makes up for it with a mastery of martial arts, being quite a skilled fighter.
Ewe Aries (ユゥ・アリーズ, Yū Arīzu)
Voiced by: Azusa Tachibana
A classmate of Spica. A sleepyhead who needs about 12 hours of rest a day just to feel awake, Ewe actually possesses quite a lot talent, being a great academic and having a high aptitude for magic. She once loved using magic, but grew to resent it when her peers fixated on her raw talent alone, save for her best friend Capella. With her Aries Magic, she is able to manipulate fire, and due to her high mana reserve and incredible talent, she is able to cast numerous high-level spells and defeat multiple other magic users at once.
Merrow Pisces (メロウ・パイシーズ, Merō Paishīzu)
Voiced by: Minori Suzuki
A classmate of Spica. Possessing a free-spirit like Leo, Merrow is cheerful and optimistic, with a dreamy air about her. She also loves to sing and dance. With her Pisces Magic, she is able to summon forth all manner of marine life, which she has a close connection to and gives them all names, even if they attack her, which she sometimes brushes off as playing. Unknown to her, however, her singing also carries magical properties, manipulating the emotions of anyone that hears her.
Chiron Sagittarius Aldea (キロン・サジタリアス・アラディア, Kiron Sajitariasu Aradia)
Voiced by: Kazuki Ura
A classmate of Spica. Chiron is the Second Prince of the Aradia Royal Family, and as such has high expectations placed on him. Like Spica, he lacks magical talent, which has led him to develop an inferiority complex. Because of it, he acts cocky and vain, being condending towards others, including his classmates, and acting rebellious to the considerate thoughts of Tarf. However, he has exceptional control over his magic where his precise control allows him to navigate dangerous environments where even minute differences can have devasatating effects. His Sagittarius Magic grants him the ability of areokinesis.
Tarf Cancer (タルフ・キャンサー, Tarufu Kyansā)
Voiced by: Shōya Ishige
A classmate of Spica. Tarf is an immigrant in service to the Aradia Royal Family alongside his father, serving as Chirons caretaker and bodyguard. While he is exceptionally loyal and possesses a high aptitude for both sports and academics, he carries a very doting side to his personality, which makes him quite meddlesome to others. He is also a big fan of animals like Leo. His Cancer Magic lets him control Metal, and while he is initially opposed to harming others, when it comes to protecting those he cares about, he will show no mercy.
Hana Sasorijō (ハナ・サソリジョウ, Hana Sasorijō)
Voiced by: Miho Wataya
A classmate of Spica. Hana comes from the Eastern Lands and is the second daughter of a Castle Shrine. She is a bookworm and initially preferred to keep her distance from others due to her Scorpio Magic hurting someone in the past. However, during her time shared with Spica, she starts to gradually open up to others. Her Scorpio Magic allows her to manipulate poison. She also has entomophobia, the only insect she isn't afraid of being scorpions.

==== Staff ====
Claude Sirius (クロード・シリウス, Kurōdo Shiriusu)
Voiced by: Nobunaga Shimazaki (Japanese); Ben Stegmair (English)
Claude is the homeroom teacher of Spica. He had been cursed into a cat form, which was briefly lifted when Spica kissed his anus. After he reverts to his cat form, he returns to the academy, serving as Spica's teacher.
Janna (ジャンヌ, Jannu)
Voiced by: Kana Hanazawa
The headmistress of the academy and the master of Claude.
Justice Libra (ジャスティス・ライブラ, Jasutisu Raibura)
Voiced by: Show Hayami
The vice-headmaster of the academy.
Procyon (プロキオン, Purokion)
Voiced by: Daisuke Hirakawa

== Media ==
=== Manga ===
Written and illustrated by Yōsuke Kaneda, The Classroom of a Black Cat and a Witch began serialization in Kodansha's Magazine Pocket website and app on March 16, 2022. The series has been compiled into 16 tankōbon volumes as of November 9, 2026. Kodansha publishes the series in English on their K Manga service.

==== Volumes ====
No.	Japanese release date	Japanese ISBN
1	July 8, 2022	978-4-06-528426-1
1. "Spica and the Black Cat" (黒猫とスピカ, Kuroneko to Supika); 2. "The Magic of the Zodiac" (十二星座の魔法, Jūni Seiza no Mahō); 3. "The Idiot Apprentice" (バカ弟子, Baka Deshi); 4. "Sorcerers and Sorceresses of the Zodiac" (十二星座の魔術師達, Jūni Seiza no Majutsushi-tachi)
2	September 9, 2022	978-4-06-529087-3
5. "Spica" (スピカ, Supika); 6. "The Story of Castor Gemini" (カストル・ジェミニの因縁, Kasutoru Jemini no Innen); 7. "The Story of Pollux Gemini" (ポルックス・ジェミニの因縁, Porukkusu Jemini no Innen); 8. "The Magic I Admire" (憧れの魔法, Akogare no Mahō); 9. "Spica And Aria" (スピカとアリア, Supika to Aria); 10. "Who's the Leader?" (リーダーは誰だ, Rīdā wa Dare da); 11. "Middle Trial" (ミドル・トライアル, Midoru Toraiaru); 12. "The Scorpio Girl" (蠍座の女, Sasori za no Onna)
3	December 9, 2022	978-4-06-529951-7
13. "The Final Hurdle" (最終関門, Saishū Kanmon); 14. "Cross Magic" (クロス・マジック, Kurosu Majikku); 15. "The Outcome of the Trial" (試験の行方, Shiken no Yukue); 16. "Hana's Friendliest Approach" (ハナちゃんのお友達大作戦, Hana-chan no o Tomodachi dai Sakusen); 17. "Astraea's Troubles" (アストレアの悩み, Asutorea no Nayami); 18. "Winter Training Camp, Start!!" (冬期合宿スタート!!, Tōki Gasshuku Sutāto!!); 19. "The Professors of Diana Academy" (ディアナの先生たち, Diana no Sensei-tachi); 20. "Shall we Dance?"
4	March 9, 2023	978-4-06-530917-9
21. "Versus Hercules Coven" (vs. ヘルクレスカヴン, Bui esu Herukuresu Kavun); 22. "The Woes of Ewe Aries" (ユゥ・アリーズの憂鬱, Yū Arīzu no Yūutsu); 23. "The Bond of Flame" (炎の絆, Honō no Kizuna); 24. "The End of Winter Term Magic Training Camp" (冬期魔法合宿終了, Tōki Mahō Gasshuku Shūryō); 25. "Spica and Arc Turus" (スピカとアルク・トゥルス, Supika to Aruku Turusu); 26. "Claude vs. Rigel" (クロード vs. リゲル, Kurōdo bui esu Rigeru); 27. "Tarf's Determination" (タルフの覚悟, Tarufu no Kakugo); * "Special Class: Claude Coven on the Beach" (特別授業 クロードカヴン・オン・ザ・ビーチ, Tokubetsu Jugyō: Kurōdo Kavun on za Bīchi)
5	July 7, 2023	978-4-06-532168-3
28. "Chiron's Resolve" (キロンの決意, Kiron no Ketsui); 29. "Spica's Battle" (スピカの戦い, Supika no Tatakai); 30. "An Excellent Magician" (優れた魔術師, Sugureta Majutsushi); 31. "Claude's Wrath" (クロードの怒り, Kurōdo no Ikari); 32. "Conclusion" (決着, Kecchaku); 33. "Diana Academy's Guardian Angel" (ディアナの守護神, Diana no Shugojin); 34. "Arcturus Pursuit, Part 1" (麦星の追想 其の一, Mugiboshi no Tsuisō - Sono Ichi); 35. "Arcturus Pursuit, Part 2" (麦星の追想 其の二, Mugiboshi no Tsuisō - Sono Ni)
6	November 9, 2023	978-4-06-533155-2
36. "Zodiac Mastery" (新授業「十二宮専科」, Shin Jugyō "Jūnikyū Senka"); 37. "Maid of the Regulus Family" (レグルス家のメイド, Regurusu-ke no Meido); 38. "Leo's Dream" (レオの夢, Reo no Yume); 39. "The Most Savage Family Quarrel" (哺乳類最強の親子ゲンカ, Honyūrui Saikyō no Oyako Genka); 40. "Herbarium Book" (ハーバリウム・ブック, Hābariumu Bukku); 41. "Io Taurus Tries Her Hardest" (イオ・トーラス がんばります, Io Tōrasu Ganbarimasu); 42. "The Mysterious Mirror World" (あなたの知らない鏡の世界, Anata no Shiranai Kagami no Sekai); 43. "Ghost vs. Magician" (幽霊 vs. 魔術師, Yūrei bui esu Majutsushi)
7	March 8, 2024	978-4-06-534859-8
44. "Oil and Water" (水と油, Mizu to Abura); 45. "Start of the Final Trial" (期末試験スタート, Kimatsu Shiken Sutāto); 46. "The Adventure on the Desert Island" (無人島の冒険, Mujintō no Bōken); 47. "Aria vs. Pollux" (アリア vs. ポルックス, Aria bui esu Porukkusu); 48. "Merrow and Spica" (メロウとスピカ, Merō to Supika); 49. "Race to the Ruby" (ルビー争奪レース, Rubī Sōdatsu Rēsu); 50. "Blue" (青色, Aoiro); 51. "Blossoming" (開花, Kaika)
8	July 9, 2024	978-4-06-536116-0
52. "Aspidochelone Island" (アスピドケロンの島, Asupidokeron no Shima); 53. "The Diamond's Location" (ダイヤの在り処, Daiya no Arika); 54. "Spica vs. Aria" (スピカ vs. アリア, Supika bui esu Aria); 55. "Limited New Magic" (新魔法, Shin Mahō); 56. "Aria's Dream" (アリアの夢, Aria no Yume); 57. "Best Friend" (ベスト・フレンド, Besuto Furendo); 58. "A Promise Under the Stars" (星空の誓い, Hoshizora no Chikai); 59. "A Forbidden Date" (禁断のデート, Kindan no Dēto)
9	November 8, 2024	978-4-06-537038-4
60. "Adult Spica" (アダルト・スピカ, Adaruto Supika); 61. "Detective Hana" (名探偵ハナ, Meitantei Hana); 62. "Kids' Panic" (キッズ・パニック, Kizzu Panikku); 63. "Claude Coven Kindergarten" (クロードカヴン幼稚園, Kurōdo Kavun Yōchien); 64. "Job Shadowing" (職業体験, Shokugyō Taiken); 65. "Spica and Mira" (スピカとミラ, Supika to Mira); 66. "Palace Defense" (王宮の守護, Ōkyū no Shugo); 67. "Order of the Black Serpent" (黒蛇教団, Burakku Sāpento)
10	February 7, 2025	978-4-06-538401-5
68. "Fight the Enemy"; 69. "Claude vs. Haut" (クロード vs. ハウト, Kurōdo bui esu Hauto); 70. "A Reason to Fight" (戦う理由, Tatakau Riyū); 71. "The Reason for Defeat" (敗因, Haīn); 72. "Hana & Aria" (ハナとアリア, Hana to Aria); 73. "Spica's Anger" (スピカの怒り, Supika no Ikari); 74. "Trident Magic" (トライデント・マジック, Toraidento Majikku); 75. "Arc" (アルク, Aruku)
11	May 9, 2025	978-4-06-539352-9
76. "Rebirth" (再生, Saisei); 77. "The Finale" (終幕, Shūmaku); 78. "The Knights" (騎士たち, Naito-tachi); 79. "Epilogue" (職業体験編 エピローグ, Shokugyō Taiken-hen Epirōgu); 80. "Jail"; 81. "Io's Magic Cold" (イオの魔法風邪, Io no Mahō Kaze); 82. "The Scoop on the Professors!" (先生たちのスクープ, Sensei-tachi no Sukūpu)
12	August 7, 2025	978-4-06-540346-4
83. "Chimera"; 84. "The Order vs. Aleister" (教団 vs. アレイスター, Kyōdan bui esu Areisutā); 85. "Lynx" (リンクス, Rinkusu); 86. "Walpurgis Night" (ヴァルプルギスの夜, Varupurugisu no Yoru); 87. "Prep for the School Festival (Mock Shop)" (学園祭準備 (模擬店編), Gakuen-sai Junbi (Mogi-ten-hen)); 88. "School Festival Preparations (Show Edition 1)" (学園祭準備 (ショー編), Gakuen-sai Junbi (Shō-hen)); 89. "Who's the Prince?" (王子さまは誰だ, Ōji-sama wa Dareda); 90. "Prep for the School Festival (Brawl)" (学園祭準備 (競技編), Gakuen-sai Junbi (Kyōgi-hen))
13	December 9, 2025	978-4-06-541887-1
91. "The Night Before the School Festival" (学園祭前夜, Gakuen-sai Zen'ya); 92. "The Opening of Diana Academy's Festival" (ディアナ校学園祭 開幕, Diana-kō Gakuen-sai Kaimaku); 93. "Cinderella" (シンデレラ, Shinderera); 94. "Making of Cinderella"; 95. "Family" (家族, Kazoku); 96. "The Evening Sky on That Day" (あの日の夕空, Ano Ki no Yūzora); 97. "The Top 10" (トップ10, Toppu Ten); 98. "The Magic Obstacle Race" (魔法障害物競走, Mahō Shōgaibutsu Rēsu)
14	March 9, 2026	978-4-06-542954-9
99. "Race Start!!" (レース開始!!, Rēsu Kaishi!!); 100. "Spica & Aria" (スピカ&アリア, "Supika Ando Aria"); 101. "The Second Test" (第二の試練, Dai Ni no Shiren); 102. "The Choice" (選択, Sentaku); 103. "Spica vs. Persephone" (スピカ vs. ペルセポネ, Supika bui esu Perusepone); 104. "Race Final" (レース決着, Rēsu Kecchaku); 105. "The Confession's Answer" (告白の答え, Kokuhaku no Kotae); 106. "Cat" (猫, Neko)
15	July 9, 2026	978-4-06-544321-7
16	November 9, 2026	978-4-06-545701-6

==== Chapters not yet in tankōbon format ====
107. Sister
108. Arc's Identity (アルクの真実, Aruku no Shinjitsu)
109. The Stray Cats (野良猫団, Nora Neko-dan)
110. Arc and Denebola (アルクとデネボラ, Aruku to Denebora)
111. The Night of the Walpurgis Festival (ヴァルプルギス祭の夜, Varupurugisu-sai no Yoru)
112. A Date with Aria (アリアとデート, Aria to Dēto)

=== Anime ===
An anime television series adaptation was announced on August 5, 2025. It is produced by Liden Films and directed by Naoyuki Tatsuwa, with Midori Gotō handling series composition, Takayuki Onoda designing the characters, and R.O.N composing the music. The series aired from April 12 to September 20, 2026, on the Agaru Anime programming block on all JNN affiliates, including CBC TV and TBS, and ran for two consecutive cours. For the first cours, the opening theme song is "Cusp", performed by Asca, while the ending theme song is Tune Up☆ (ちゅーんあっぷ☆, Chiyun Apu☆), performed by Spira Spica. For the second cours, the opening theme song is "∞Rettōsei" (∞劣等星; Infinitely Inferior Star), performed by Akari Nanawo, while the ending theme song is "Twilight Magic", performed by Shoko Nakagawa. Crunchyroll is streaming the series. Medialink licensed the series. An English dub was released on November 17, 2026.

==== Episodes ====
No.	Title	Directed by (Note: Production staff information is taken from the ending credits of each episode.)	Written by	Storyboard by	Original release date
1	"Black Cat and Spica"; Transliteration: "Kuroneko to Supika" (Japanese: 黒猫とスピカ)	Hiroshi Aoyagi	Midori Gotō	Masao Suzuki	April 12, 2026
Claude Sirius, the Royal Magic Academy’s youngest professor and First Class Magician, mysteriously vanishes during a Cultist attack and is branded a coward. Two years later, Spica Virgo aspires to be like Claude, despite her inability to cast spells, because he saved her life during the Cultist attack and was not a coward. Spica encounters a talking black cat who claims to be a cursed magician. He promises to teach her if she retrieves the Book of Providence from the Royal Library to cure his curse, a task he cannot do because the library's Mother Grimoire detects non-humans. Finding a book on Ancient Runes, Spica reads the runes on Mother Grimoire, which reveals a hidden library containing Providence. The sentient runestone reveals the cure is Rebirth Magic, which Spica unknowingly possesses, but it must be delivered via a kiss to the cat's anus. When a Cultist sends an Orthrus monster to attack them, Spica desperately performs the kiss. The cat transforms into Claude Sirius, who destroys the Orthrus. Restored, Claude selfishly refuses to teach her, but suddenly reverts to a cat. Providence explains the cure is temporary; for a permanent cure, Spica must match Claude's power, meaning Claude must train Spica into a First Class Magician.
2	"Magic of the Zodiac"; Transliteration: "Jū-ni Seiza no Mahō" (Japanese: 十二星座の魔法)	Tetsuaki Moda & Kazuya Fujishiro	Midori Gotō	Tetsuaki Moda	April 19, 2026
Spica learns magic corresponds to the Zodiac, meaning people only command their birth element. As a Virgo, Spica has Plant magic, but her magic control is the worst Claude has ever seen. When Spica's mother breaks her leg, Claude suggests Spica manage their family farm entirely with magic for six months before her entrance exam. After weeks of labor, her skill and confidence soar. Spica travels to the Diana Academy entrance exam with her friend Aria, an Aquarius who wields Water magic. En route, a golem attacks the examinees. While others flee, Aria destroys the golem, but it reforms. Recalling her time in the Royal Library, Spica remembers golems possess cores inscribed with EMETH (Truth) and erasing the first 'E' leaves METH (Death), destroying it. Claude chides Spica for not fighting herself. Ashamed, she joins Aria, using vines like a whip to slice the 'E' from the core, returning the golem to harmless earth. Vice-Principal Justice Libra appears, revealing the golem was the exam. He passes Aria for her skill and power and Spica for her courage in protecting others. Later, the Principal is shocked to receive a letter from Claude, her former apprentice.
3	"The Magicians of the Zodiac"; Transliteration: "Jū-ni Seiza no Majutsushi-tachi" (Japanese: 十二星座の魔術師たち)	Shinsuke Terasawa	Midori Gotō	Shinsuke Terasawa	April 26, 2026
Situated under the Witch Hat World Tree, the 1,000-year-old Diana Royal Magic Academy, founded by the witch Selene, hosts 600 students in Middle and High School. Principal Jeanne reinstates Claude, but remains furious he vanished for two years. To allow Claude to teach in human form, Spica must resentfully kiss his anus every morning, igniting scandalous rumours from the outraged Dorm Mother. Spica frees student Io Taurus from being stuck in a wall, who explains students form 12-student covens with one teacher for three years. Spica soon meets her eccentric classmates: playboy Astraea Libra (psychic magic), Castor Gemini (self-cloning), Leo Regulus (animal transformation), and Io (giant transformation). To her horror, they are all in Claude’s coven; Claude having been assigned the 12 most troublesome students to atone for rumoured cowardice, and warned if even one drops out he will lose his job permanently. Academically, Spica struggles while Ewe Aries aces every question while asleep. During practical assessments, Claude notes Aria's high skill, Hana Sasorijō’s collateral-heavy Scorpio Poison magic, and Tarf Cancer’s capabilities. Spica finishes dead last. Because the academy expels the worst performing 10% of students each year, Claude sentences her to remedial study classes.
4	"Castor Gemini's Fate"; Transliteration: "Kasutoru・Jemini no Innen" (Japanese: カストル・ジェミニの因縁)	Daisuke Shimamura, Amatsuka & Nobutaka Ota	Midori Gotō	Daisuke Shimamura	May 3, 2026
The students become infamous for their behaviour, earning their coven the nickname "Pandora's Box." Jeanne warns Claude that Castor faces expulsion for truancy. Claude and Spica intervene as Castor beats a student he claims groped him. Castor declares he would rather be expelled than learn from Claude, revealing he was among the students Claude abandoned during the cultist attack. During the confrontation, Castor falls into a river and touches Io's hand, revealing he shares a body with his twin sister, Pollux. They swap places whenever they touch the opposite gender, which is why Castor so often beats up boys, as he appears when they grope Pollux. While Castor is violent, Pollux is cheerful—yet both resent Claude. Claude later admits to Spica that while abandoning students was a necessary tactical choice, his subsequent two-year disappearance was unintended. Suddenly, monsters ambush them. Pollux runs out of magic, leaving her naked as her cloned clothes vanish. Claude arrives, defeats the monsters, and genuinely apologizes for his past actions before rushing away to secretly transform back into a cat. Touched, Pollux convinces Castor to give Claude another chance and attend class. Meanwhile, a shadowy group watches from afar, targeting Spica specifically for her "Rebirth" power.
5	"Spica and Aria"; Transliteration: "Supika to Aria" (Japanese: スピカとアリア)	Shunji Yoshida	Midori Gotō	Hiroshi Aoyagi	May 10, 2026
Claude fears Spica will fail midterms because her lack of imagination limits her magic. Resentfully, Spica asks Aria for training. Aria demonstrates how she shapes water freely, then challenges Spica to a Lophorn Rabbit hunting contest. Aria is secretly upset that Spica spends more time with Claude than her. A week later, Claude and Aria are amazed by Spica’s progress and her willingness to endure injuries from untested spells. Though Spica loses and must serve as Aria's maid for 24 hours, Aria is happy they are close again. Claude decides to select a Student Leader for the coven. While observing candidates over the weekend, Claude is stuck in his cat form. He is adopted by a delusional Merrow Pisces, who forces him into a dress, and is subsequently bothered by a crude Prince Chiron Sagittarius and his over-loyal servant Tarf. After Hana Sasorijō accidentally spills a sex potion on him that attracts the entire dorm, Capella Capricorn calmly dispels its effects. Impressed, Claude appoints Capella as Leader. Later, Claude reveals the midterm is a high-stakes dungeon exploration. While Hana confidently promises her family she will top the first-years, a giant Griffon suddenly approaches their airship enroute to the exam.
6	"Midterms"; Transliteration: "Midoru・Toraiaru" (Japanese: ミドル・トライアル)	Taro Kubo & Takashi Ueno	Midori Gotō	Takashi Kawabata & Takashi Ueno	May 17, 2026
Claude reveals the gryphon's immense nest is the dungeon, and the midterm requires stealing gold before sunset. Teleporting to safety is an instant failure. Claude hopes the students discover the dungeon's true meaning, but grows incensed when the incompetent Spica delays herself and a furious Hana from entering for ten minutes. Spica assumes Hana dislikes her due to a crush on Claude, while Hana expects Spica to be useless. However, Spica surprises her by trapping a gryphon in a vine cage. When monster hornets cause the bug-phobic Hana to panic, she accidentally burns nearby students with acid rain. Their contempt drives her back to hostility aimed at Spica. Meanwhile, Ewe is disqualified after falling asleep and being eaten, while Chiron and Tarf are also eliminated. An angry Hana sets indiscriminate poison traps, claims victory, and abandons Spica. She then encounters an immense, two-headed mutant gryphon using lightning magic. A flashback reveals Hana accidentally poisoned a child, leaving her terrified of causing or receiving harm. The gryphon overpowers Hana, but Spica's vine shield rescues her. Spica grabs her hand without fear of poison, accusing Hana of secretly wanting friends. Realizing wood resists electricity, they combine their magic to injure the gryphon, which strangely smiles at Spica.
7	"Cross Magic"; Transliteration: "Kurosu・Majikku" (Japanese: クロス・マジック)	Takushi Ueno	Midori Gotō	Takushi Ueno	May 24, 2026
Spica and Hana combine their powers using Cross Magic. Embracing rather than fearing her Poison Magic, Hana’s cooperation with Spica sprouts hundreds of poisonous flowers, defeating the gryphon. Spica is glad they make a good team. Elsewhere, Castor fails to cooperate with Astraea and Io, forcing Pollux to take over their shared body. Hana finds the required gold, but Spica collapses from exhaustion. Claude is visibly disappointed. When Spica awakens, Hana reveals they ran out of time and failed the exam. Spica feels guilty, but Hana is satisfied, having found something more valuable than victory. Meanwhile, Aria passes with Merrow Pisces, alongside Io, Astraea, and Castor/Pollux. Despite their technical failure, Claude praises Spica for cooperating with Hana, leading Justice to suspect Claude is growing as a person and an instructor. As the only failures, Spica, Hana, Chiron, Tarf, and Ewe must attend a three-day remedial camp in the frozen mountains where academy founder Selene trained. Anxious about their blossoming friendship, Hana overthinks things when invited shopping with Io and Aria. Spica insists on visiting the Witch Hat World Tree, where everyone agrees Hana has become nicer. They commemorate their first shopping trip with a group photograph.
8	"Winter Camp Begins!!"; Transliteration: "Tōki Gasshuku Sutāto!!" (Japanese: 冬期合宿スタート!!)	Kazuya Fujishiro	Yuho Togashi	Shinji Itadaki	May 31, 2026
Exam failures head to Mount Selene for remedial lessons, where Selene's ancient magic causes all four seasons to manifest simultaneously. First, Claude forces each student to destroy 10 golems, throwing them into a magic spring to recharge when they are exhausted. Professor Betelgeuse quizzes them on zodiac signs while they climb an icy slope, a task derailed by Ewe constantly falling asleep. Masochistic Professor Polaris demands they strike her with their strongest spells to satisfy her, with Tarf struggling due to his aversion to violence. Professor Procyon uses Psychic Magic during meditation to scan their subconscious minds, discovering Chiron hides weakness behind bravado, while Ewe lacks any interest in magic. Ewe only applied to Diana because her childhood friend, Capella, said it would be fun. Capella, who passed the midterms but came to remedial camp anyway, worries about Ewe, who is secretly Pandora’s Box's strongest mage when awake. Cross Magic expert Professor Pegasus requires every student to cast a spell with all five peers. Due to clashing personalities, this takes five hours. Pegasus notes that Virgos like Spica can cooperate with all magic types to cast spells from all 12 Zodiac signs. As Claude dreads the upcoming difficult lesson from Professor Hercules, killers Rigel and Arc plot Spica's murder.
9	"Bond of Flames"; Transliteration: "Honō no Kizuna" (Japanese: 炎の絆)	Daisuke Shimamura & Misato Takata	Midori Gotō	Daisuke Shimamura	June 8, 2026
Professor Hercules announces a coven battle where the losers face an extra week of intense remedial strength training. Pandora’s Box is matched against Hercules’s coven, led by the arrogant Korne Phoros. Though Korne expects an easy victory, Pandora’s Box coordinates effectively, trapping and eliminating two of his teammates. Meanwhile, Spica realizes Ewe is trying to lose on purpose just to nap. When Spica suggests finding a goal that benefits others, Korne abruptly ambushes them. He captures Ewe, and his teammate Ras disqualifies Spica, Hana, Chiron, and Tarf. Capella rescues Ewe but sacrifices her own safety badge to shield her from a fireball, leaving Ewe as the lone survivor. Korne gloats, mocking Ewe as an obvious liability for Pandora's Box. However, Capella reveals she deliberately kept Ewe in the game, fully trusting her to win. Motivated by Capella's expectations, Ewe embraces her hidden talent. Unleashing the strongest fire magic among the first years alongside sharp battlefield instincts, she defeats Korne’s entire team, enjoying every second of it. Capella reflects that Ewe repressed her magic because past instructors constantly pushed her to meet their expectations, whereas genuine trust finally unlocked her true potential.
10	"The Attack"; Transliteration: "Shūgeki" (Japanese: 襲撃)	Tetsuya Endō	Midori Gotō	Hiroshi Aoyagi	June 15, 2026
Claude’s attempt to confess his curse to the professors is cut short by a drunk Polaris, who wants him to abuse her. The final class with Professor Deneb begins with a shocking order to strip to their underwear, which turns out to be a medical checkup and healing session. Deneb is concerned over Spica, who has already fully healed her own wounds using an unknown magic. As the group prepares to return to school, Arc lures Spica away, strangling her with venomous snakes to make her miss the train. Arc reveals she intends to steal Spica's Rebirth magic, mocking her for thinking it was healing magic when it actually grants god-like power. Before Spica loses consciousness, Claude and Pandora’s Box arrive. Arc's snake tattoo exposes her as a cultist, shocking Claude who recognizes her as his former student. Suddenly, Rigel emerges from the shadows, claiming to serve Asclepius. Rigel utilizes forbidden shadow magic to seize Spica, but Claude intercepts him. Being perversely obsessed with cannibalising those who love and care for each other, Rigel transforms into the Beelzebub Serpent to devour them. Claude repels the Serpent and orders a retreat, but expends his magic and reverts into a cat. Taking charge of the panicked group, Spica leads their escape down the mountain.
11	"Tarf's Purpose, Chiron's Resolve"; Transliteration: "Tarufu no Kakugo Kiron no Ketsui" (Japanese: タルフの覚悟 キロンの決意)	Katsuya Furumoto	Yuho Togashi	Shinji Itadaki	June 22, 2026
As everyone rushes for the train, Spica tries to turn Claude human but fails. Tarf realizes coddling Chiron has turned him into a spoiled brat, as well as preventing Tarf from improving his own skills. The group finds Rigel has sabotaged the tracks. Rigel appears and poisons Ewe, prompting Tarf to trap him in an iron box to block his shadow teleportation. Seeking to restore her magic to transform Claude, Spica remembers the magic recovery pool from Claude's lesson. Though Rigel could escape and target Spica, Chiron realizes the pool is within his ten-minute flight limit. Tarf trusts him, boosting Chiron's confidence. During the flight, Chiron confesses to Spica he is a coward with less magic than his brother, the First Prince. Arc intercepts them and Chiron freezes but snaps out of it when Spica urges him to flee. Disgusted by his cowardice, Chiron uses wind magic to launch a wooden spear, freeing Spica. Furious, Arc unleashes life-draining flames, blocking the pool and capturing Claude. Arc claims Claude is merely manipulating Spica for her Rebirth magic, but Spica counters that she is only using Claude to become a First Class Magician. Retrieving Claude, Spica and Chiron use Cross Magic to form a wind empowered bow and arrow.
12	"The Superior Magician"; Transliteration: "Sugureta Majutsushi" (Japanese: 優れた魔術師)	Toshifumi Okuno	Midori Gotō	Shinji Itadaki	June 29, 2026
During the magical clash, Chiron is knocked unconscious. Arc tries to grab Spica, only to find a root doll decoy. Spica reaches the pool and successfully restores Claude to human form. Arc realizes that despite being Claude's weakest student, Spica’s superior tactics make her a genuine threat. Rigel appears, claiming his Beelzebub has devoured Spica’s friends. However, Claude swiftly overwhelms Rigel and destroys Beelzebub. A metal ball drops from Beelzebub's stomach, revealing Tarf generated it to shield everyone from the stomach acid. Lynx, a more powerful cultist, arrives just as the school professors appear. Uninterested in fighting, Lynx lazily acts as a "taxi" and flees with Arc, who shouts a muffled message to Spica. Rigel is arrested by the military. Though Spica blames herself for the chaos, Claude assures her he is proud. To secure her safety, Jeanne adds heavy security around Spica, disrupting her daily life. Claude notes that a Bracelet of Hermes would let her teleport safely between school and home, but the necessary zircon stones are trapped in a monster-infested mine. Turning it into a training exercise, they visit the mine with Jeanne, where her competitiveness with Claude means Spica never gets the chance to fight any of the monsters before retrieving the zircon.
13	"Memories of Arcturus"; Transliteration: "Mugiboshi no Tsuisō" (Japanese: 麦星の追想)	Takushi Ueno	Midori Gotō	Takushi Ueno	July 5, 2026
Claude informs Spica that the cult consists of Ophiuchus Magic users who believe they are chosen by God to oppose the Selene Religion. The cult leader’s daughter, Arc, was born with Rebirth Magic, capable of even resurrecting the dead, which her father used to manipulate followers. Hating this, Arc fled, and Jeanne hid her identity so she could attend Diane Academy. Claude hoped her magic could benefit society, but the cult kidnapped her. Days later, Arc led the cult's attack on the Academy, claiming Claude lied to her. To protect unsuspecting students, Claude fled to draw Arc away, resulting in false accusations of his cowardice. During their duel, Arc forced Claude to reincarnate as a cat, exhausting her magic before vanishing. Claude remains unaware of what lie Arc thinks he told her, but knows he must defeat Arc to protect Spica, who hopes to capture Arc alive to clear the misunderstanding. Back at school, a newly added class separates students to train their signs specific magic. Spica joins the Virgo students to train in plant magic under Professor Pegasus. She learns about the Herbarium, a magical book that stores plants for combat, but it costs 50,000 gold. Spica seeks a part-time job, and Leo hires her as an extra maid for a ball at her family's mansion.
14	"Maids at the House of Regulus"; Transliteration: "Regurusu-ke no Meido" (Japanese: レグルス家のメイド)	Yoshihiro Takamoto	Midori Gotō	Shinji Itadaki	July 13, 2026 (Note: Due to the broadcast of the 2026 FIVB Women's Volleyball Nations League, this episode aired at 12:15 a.m. JST, 45 minutes after the regular air time on CBC Television.)
Expecting a gente, refined maid position, Spica is horrified to discover the Regulus household maids are muscular brutes who treat chores as heavy weight training. She also meets Leo's wild father, Lord Alterf Wolf, who expects Leo to inherit his title and lands after the ball, which is also Leo's debut into noble society. Spica is impressed by Leo's maturity, but Claude has his doubts. When Leo vanishes right as the ball begins, Spica finds her hiding among her menagerie of animals. Leo confesses her true dream: inspired by her late mother, she wants to become an animal scholar rather than a Lord. Alterf tracks them down, sparking a violent fistfight where Leo finally voices her desires. Alterf yields, revealing he promised his late wife to always prioritize Leo's happiness, and gladly gives his blessing. Though they miss the official ball, a triumphant Leo dances with Spica to celebrate her newly embraced future.
15	"Astraea's Troubles"; Transliteration: "Asutorea no Nayami" (Japanese: アストレアの悩み)	Hironori Aoyagi & Kazuya Fujishiro	Midori Gotō	Hironori Aoyagi	July 19, 2025
15	"Herbarium Book"; Transliteration: "Hābariumu・Bukku" (Japanese: ハーバリウム・ブック)	Hironori Aoyagi & Kazuya Fujishiro	Midori Gotō	Hironori Aoyagi	July 19, 2025
Astraea confesses to Claude his crush on Pollux and asks for sex-changing magic to prevent Pollux from turning into Castor, whom Astraea dislikes, when he touches her. Disgusted yet helpful, Claude reveals a potion recipe requiring Ghostweed, which Astraea, Claude, and Spica gather after Astraea fends off vampire bats with high-level magic inspired by his Pollux obsession. After taking the potion, Astraea rushes to confess but drops the potion, triggering gender-swaps for everyone in Pandora’s Box. Pollux becomes Castor, causing Astraea to realize his attraction to Castor as well and faint. Once the spell wears off, Pollux unexpectedly asks Astraea to discuss transformation magic. Dorm Mother misunderstands the situation and demands Claude confess his own perversion to the Principal. Testing Spica’s new Herbarium, Claude orders Pandora's Box to capture swift, violent Devil Lophorn Rabbits. While most struggle, Spica brilliantly stops the rabbits movement by covering the ground in thorns. However, her follow-up sleeping pollen overspreads, exposing her classmates' repressed traits: Leo grows clingy, Hana laughs uncontrollably, Io and Astraea turn exhibitionist, Chiron becomes depressed, Castor grows effeminate, and Aria apologizes for tormenting Spica. An unhappy Claude freezes the pollen and sends the group to the nurse. Afterward, he lectures Spica on letting her Herbarium's abilities make her reckless.
16	"Io Taurus Gets To Work"; Transliteration: "Io・Tōrasu Ganbarimasu" (Japanese: イオ・トーラス がんばります)	Hiroshi Kimura	Midori Gotō & Yūho Togashi	Shinji Itadaki	July 26, 2026
To help Io manage her troublesome strength and clumsy nature, Claude has her volunteer at the academy alongside Castor, who is serving a fighting punishment. While cleaning, two middle schoolers ask them to rescue their missing dog, Comet, last seen near a mirror rumoured to house a ghostly woman. When the mirror absorbs Spica, Io and Castor dive into a realm of infinite hallways and doors. The ghost appears, injures Castor, and kidnaps Spica. Io blames herself, but Castor angrily tells her to stop crying and do something useful. Guided by Pollux's internal voice, Castor realizes the attacker isn't a ghost, but a Gemini magic user using light manipulation and high-intensity lasers. Io tracks the invisible enemy using her enhanced hearing and crushes him with her giant transformation. Spica is rescued thanks to a petal trail she left behind. The "ghost" turns out to be a pervert light magic user who found the magic mirror and used it to target middle school students. Thrilled to finally be useful, Io celebrates her success while Pollux teases Castor about his growing interest in her. Spica wonders if the pervert only found the mirror instead of creating it, then could it have been a real ghost that initially kidnapped Comet.
17	"Finals"; Transliteration: "Fainaru・Toraiaru" (Japanese: ファイナル・トライアル)	Xian Xin Liu	Midori Gotō	Shinji Itadaki	August 2, 2026
Before Finals Spica has her potential measured and is disappointed she has high Inspiration but is average in Magic, Technique, Knowledge and Physical. Hana measures high on Knowledge but low on Inspiration, while Ewe has high Magic but low Physical. Chiron has high Technique and Leo has high Physical. Aria scores high on all five. Spica begins studying to improve Knowledge. Aria is surprised Spica was serious about becoming First Class, causing Spica to shout at her. Claude intervenes and Spica admits she hates that everything she tries Aria is instantly better at it than her and rubs it in her face. Claude suggests the problem might be in Spica's head, if she has become used to losing against Aria, she might have convinced herself she is supposed to lose, so he insists she outperform Aria during Finals. The exam is held on Aspidochelone Island and Claude explains there are 40 hidden gems they must collect for points that determine their exam grades. As the exam lasts all night, they must also find shelter, water and food. The exam is also a competition, so stealing gems from each other is encouraged, and anyone who scores zero has automatically failed. Everyone is inspired by Spica and Aria's rivalry and all decide to get the highest score.
18	"Adventures on a Deserted island" Transliteration: "Mujintō no Bōken" (Japanese: 無人島の冒険)	Shunji Yoshida	Midori Gotō	Takashi Kawabata	August 9, 2026
Students receive voodoo dolls as protectors; Spica’s doll, Voodie, warns that intervening to save Spica's life more than three times means failing the exam. Voodie outlines the available gems, including a 100-point diamond "sleeping in the heart", though it is against the rules for Voodie to explain what this means. Spica rushes into a cave and escapes a Grossworm by jamming a cactus into its mouth. Voodie glows green, detecting a 30 point emerald nearby. While Spica watches, Pollux and Aria battle for the emerald. Pollux steals the emerald but flees toward the ocean. With unlimited water to manipulate, Aria overwhelms Pollux, forcing her to rely on her Voodie for protection and surrender the gem. The battle blows away Merrow’s dolphin friend, Johnny, who lands directly on Spica’s campfire. Desperate to treat Johnny's burns, Spica learns from Merrow’s Voodie that aloe grows on a nearby mountain. Spica and Merrow climb the mountain, retrieve the aloe, and become friends. However, Voodie reminds Spica that after wasting precious time aiding a rival, she has zero gems, no camp for the night, and only 14 hours remaining.
19	"Race for the Ruby"; Transliteration: "Rubī Sōdatsu Rēsu" (Japanese: ルビー争奪レース)	Kōji Aritomi	Yūho Togashi	Shinji Itadaki	August 16, 2026
Claude notes Aria is in the lead with an emerald and a sapphire. He is frustrated the others are fooling around, and furious Spica has found no gems at all. To threaten Spica, he sends updates to everyone that includes their current scores, in particular Spica's score of zero. A giant Armoured Vulture flies nearby carrying a 50-point ruby. Before Spica can come up with a plan, Leo, Capella and Ewe race to attack the vulture first. Spica falls behind after being slammed into a cliff, while Leo and Capella grab the vulture in midair and ride on its back. The vulture slams into a mountain, causing Leo and Capella to have to be saved by their Voodies. Ewe summons ultra-high-heat blue flames, melting the vulture's armour. Before she can retrieve the ruby, the vulture takes flight in a panic. The others realise Spica is standing in the vulture's nest with its babies. As it comes closer, Spica reveals the nest and the babies were all made from wood. With the vulture over the forest, Spica manipulates the trees to form a giant cage around the vulture. Ewe tries to burn it, but Spica forms a wooden shield Ewe can not burn through with her remaining mana, so Ewe gives up.
20	"Finding the Diamond"; Transliteration: "Daiya no Arika" (Japanese: ダイヤの在処)	Yoshinobu Takayama	Midori Gotō	Mei Araya	August 23, 2026
Everyone is impressed by Spica's successful plan. At 10 PM, Claude updates the scores: Aria retains first place with 90 points, while Spica climbs to fourth with 50. Spica obsessively studies the clue, "Diamond sleeps in the heart." Suddenly, an earthquake reveals the island is actually the colossal skeleton of monster sea turtle Aspidochelone, revived at night by Selene's ancient charm magic. Deducing the clue refers to the turtle's literal heart, Spica heads to the worm cave to find an internal route, prompting others to follow. Inside, Chiron gets lost until meeting Hana and Astraea. When the worms attack with acid slime Chiron uses wind magic to collapse the ceiling onto the monsters, earning Hana's respect. Meanwhile, Spica avoids the cave after suspecting the provided maps were misleading. Applying magic to her map reveals an alternate view of the turtle, exposing a hidden cave under the neck only accessible when the turtle lifts its head. Inside, she discovers a bioluminescent forest and the turtle's stone heart bearing the 100-point diamond. Before she can claim it, Aria arrives to challenge her for the prize.
21	"Spica vs. Aria"; Transliteration: "Supika VS Aria" (Japanese: スピカVSアリア)	Katsuya Furumoto	Yūho Togashi	Shinji Itadaki	August 30, 2026
Aria suggests they simply blast each other with magic until one of them requires saving by their Voodie twice. Used to being stronger than Spica, Aria tries to overwhelm her with power, but Spica unexpectedly uses superior strategy, and Aria ends up being the first one requiring her Voodie to save her. Aria decides to fight seriously, but Spica covers her in Cotton Flower Bombs that grow larger, heavier and denser the more water they absorb. Unfortunately, Aria lowers her water temperature below freezing, shattering all the nearby plants and forcing Voodie to protect Spica. Spica fears she will never surpass Aria, who even when they first met had extreme levels of talent while Spica struggled to complete even simple tasks. The first time they competed, Aria sewed a perfect fabric doll in mere minutes, while Spica took an entire month of effort to sew a doll of equal quality, by which time Aria had already sewn a full plushie doll. From that moment on, no matter what Spica attempted, Aria was always there already being better at it than Spica. Frustrated, but determined not to quit, Spica decides to use a spell she learned from Professor Pegasus.
22	"Aria's Dream"; Transliteration: "Aria no Yume" (Japanese: アリアの夢)	Norifumi Okuno	Midori Gotō	Shinji Itadaki	September 6, 2026
Aria tries to freeze everything again, but Spica shields herself inside a Skunk Cabbage, a plant that generates its own heat, grown massive through Pegasus's "Limit Break" spell. Spica then uses Limit Break on a carnivorous plant to attack Aria. Mid-battle, Aria realizes she torments Spica because Spica still pursues her dreams, whereas Aria abandoned hers. As sunrise approaches, Aspidochelone reverts to a normal island, threatening to trap both underwater. Aria recalls her dream was to become a world-class fencer for her father, a retired fencer who never managed to become champion. However, his endless training stripped away the joy she once felt until she lost the Imperial Fencing Championship on purpose. Believing dreams only cause suffering, Aria quit fencing and swore to never have a dream again. Spica drops her wand and nearly drowns. Voodie prepares to rescue her, but Johnny reappears with Spica's lost wand. Exhausting the last of their magic, the girls clash in a final, explosive attack. Later, they wash up on the beach. Aria's Voodie having had to save her from drowning, while Spica successfully claims the diamond.
23	"Promising Upon a Starry Night"; Transliteration: "Hoshizora no Chikai" (Japanese: 星空の誓い)	Fukutarō Hattori	Midori Gotō	Shinji Itadaki	September 13, 2026
With Claude transformed into a cat, Principal Jeanne announces the exam results. Chiron despairs at facing expulsion for finding no gems, but discovers a Sapphire caught in his clothing. Secretly, Hana planted one of her gems on him, believing he truly earned it. The final scores reveal Spica as the clear winner with 150 points, while Aria places second with 90. Waiting for their ship, the students and their magical Voodie dolls celebrate with a beach party. Although Claude refuses to overly praise Spica, he admits she won because her past failures gave her the experience to manage her magic better than the highly skilled Aria, who had never totally depleted her magic before. Later, Spica finds a tearful Aria, devastated by her first-ever defeat and envious of Spica’s fearless ability to pursue dreams. Spica gently advises Aria to find a new dream but keep it a secret to protect it from being ruined by others. Inspired, Aria declares her new goal: to become a First Class Magician before Spica, sparking a new, more friendly rivalry. The spell animating the Voodies runs out, turning them back to normal dolls. Jeanne lets the upset Spica take her Voodie home with her.
24	"The Forbidden Date"; Transliteration: "Kindan no Dēto" (Japanese: 禁断のデート)	Takashi Ueno	Midori Gotō	Shinji Itadaki	September 20, 2026
After placing first in the exam, Spica rises to fourth overall in her year. When her wand snaps from the exam damage, Claude offers to help her buy a stronger replacement. Spica nervously treats the outing like a date, while a suspicious Aria and Hana tail them to decide if Claude requires arresting by the police. At a café, Spica orders a couple’s drink with two straws to test Claude. Outraged, Aria and Hana try to intervene, but Claude magically teleports Spica to a rooftop, leaving Aria and Hana to awkwardly share the drink instead. Spica tumbles off the roof and lands unharmed inside a carriage carrying magic dust, which temporarily ages her into a buxom adult. Claude fails to recognize her, so Spica pretends to be her own older relative and offers to help search for "Spica." During the search, Claude calls Spica scatterbrained and naïve, but adds that she can also be hardworking, brave, and a wonderful friend. After returning to normal, Claude finds and scolds her for wandering off, yet gifts her the flower-shaped wand her "relative" admired earlier. Reassured by his true feelings, Spica resolves to work harder than ever to become a First Class Mage.

== See also ==
- Boarding School Juliet, another manga series by the same author
