= Miho Wataya =

Japanese voice actor

- 渡谷 美帆
- Born: August 26; Kanagawa Prefecture, Japan
- Occupation: Voice actor
- Years active: ????-present
- Agent: REMAX
- Notable work: Granblue Fantasy as You
- Height: 153 cm (5 ft 0 in)

Miho Wataya (渡谷 美帆, Wataya Miho; born August 26) is a Japanese voice actress from Kanagawa Prefecture, Japan.

== Filmography ==
=== Anime ===
2014

- Celestial Method as Resident
- Magic Kaito 1412
- Selector Infected Wixoss as girl
- Your Lie in April as parent; high school girl

2015

- Chivalry of a Failed Knight as girl
- Bikini Warriors as goddess
- Durarara!!×2 Shō as reporter
- Isuca as girl

2016

- Active Raid as operator B
- Digimon Universe: App Monsters as girl; elementary schoolgirl
- Rilu Rilu Fairilu ~Yōsei no Door~ as Haruto Kusunoki; Jasmine; Lilas Hanamura; Omatsu; Tora; Urara
- Schwarzesmarken as Rosalinde Buch; Paul Meyer
- WWW.Wagnaria!! as male student B
- Yu-Gi-Oh! Arc-V

2017

- Dream Festival! R as fan
- Elegant Yokai Apartment Life as Gyaru A; Yon-chan; female student
- Food Wars! Shokugeki no Soma: The Third Plate as woman A
- Fuuka as female staff member
- Gamers! as student B; female student B; waitress; clerk
- Kino's Journey —the Beautiful World— the Animated Series as child A
- MARGINAL#4 KISS kara Sōzōru Big Bang as girl; AD; controller
- Minami Kamakura High School Girls Cycling Club as member A
- My Girlfriend Is Shobitch as female student
- Re:Creators as child
- Rewrite as child; woman
- Rilu Rilu Fairilu ~Mahō no Kagami~ as Haruto Kusunoki
- Sakura Quest as female announcer; old woman
- Time Bokan 24 as town girl 2
- The Idolmaster SideM as boy; Dance Trainer
- Urara Meirocho as clerk

2018

- Aguu: Tensai Ningyou as dancer lady C
- Dakaichi as woman
- Comic Girls as clerk; grandmother
- Dame×Prince Anime Caravan as citizen B
- Golden Kamuy as Ainu girls
- Idolish7 as Strawberries
- Rokuhōdō Yotsuiro Biyori as customer; clerk
- Seven Senses of the Reunion as adventurer

2019

- Fairy Gone as old woman
- Fruits Basket as student
- Kandagawa Jet Girls as interviewer
- Teasing Master Takagi-san as girl B
- The Case Files of Lord El-Melloi II as magician
- Wasteful Days of High School Girls as Game Center woman 1; elementary schooler

2020

- Darwin's Game as nursing teacher
- Food Wars! Shokugeki no Soma: The Fifth Plate as cook A
- Genie Family 2020 as housewife
- If My Favorite Pop Idol Made It to the Budokan, I Would Die as old lady
- Interspecies Reviewers as Tamatehime
- Mewkledreamy as scholar

2021

- Blue Reflection Ray as granny
- Higehiro as older brother
- Mieruko-chan as Arai
- That Time I Got Reincarnated as a Slime Season 2 as elf D

2022

- Akebi's Sailor Uniform as TV audio
- Love After World Domination as boy B; announcer; boy

2026

- The Classroom of a Black Cat and a Witch as Hana Sasorijo
- Thunder 3 as Sydney

=== Theatrical anime ===
2015

- Ongaku Shōjo as cat

=== Web anime ===
2021

- Gundam Breaker Battlogue as event participant

=== Video games ===
2013

- AiColle ~with you~ as Ai Yumeno; Feni
- Code of Joker

2014

- Anmin Hizamakura ~Shūshin 5-bu Mae no Iyashi Time~ Kaede Shirasaki Ver. as Kaede Shirasaki
- Heroes Placement as Kanen Sonode; Suzu Koie; Manchiru Zenibaku; Uto Criterium; Laura Samezu; Tenma Mizushima; Nanari Nirasaki; Mira Uozu; Ara Oyada
- Uchi no Hime-sama ga Ichiban Kawaii as Millie Spica
- Yuki Yuna is a Hero

2015

- Armed Girls
- Genjū Hime as Uru
- Granblue Fantasy as You; Burning Indigo
- Langrisser Re:Incarnation Tensei
- Princess Connect!
- Quiz RPG: The World of Mystic Wiz as Sorissa Mima; Milneemo
- Thousand Memories as Molina, Pistol of the Dark; Annetta, Piercing Princess of Flame; Melville, Guard Captain of the Artillery Arm; Pipi, Soul Swordsman

2016

- Black Night Strikers as Jeanne d'Arc; Bishop Cauchon
- Formation Girls as Jamie Lacey; Mariane Carly
- Icchibanketsu -Online- as Yaoya Oshichi
- Odin Sphere Leifthrasir as Mori
- Sengoku Kitan Muramasa -Miyabi- as Tachibana Ginchiyo

2017

- Clash of Panzer as Clark Meyer
- Destiny Child as Ishtar
- Fight League as Shinobu Nekoma (Shinobu Catari)

2018

- Dungeon Fighter Online as Falmel; Moplin
- Gintama Rumble as Hyakka; tradeswoman
- Monster Strike as Apocalypse; Apricot
- Secret of Mana as Pamela
- Tenka Hyakken -Zan- as Furiwakegami Hiromitsu

2020

- Disney Twisted-Wonderland as Trey Clover (young)
- KiraKira Monstars as Arisa

2021

- Isekai ni Tobasaretara Papa ni Nattandaga ~Seirei Kishidan Monogatari~ as Suzaku
- Jack Jeanne
- Mega Man X DiVE as Hunter R
- Monster Hunter Rise as Hunter
- Touhou Danmaku Kagura as Minoriko Aki
- World of Demons - Hyakki Madō as Ibaraki-dōji

2022

- Umamusume: Pretty Derby as Purple Scrunchie Horse Girl

=== Drama CD ===
2011

- Otome Yōkai Zakuro

2013

- Minarai Megami Purupurun Sharumu

2014

- Karneval: Futari no Yogi
- Miss Monochrome -Motto Challenge- Colorful God

2015

- Gomidame PEACE 5th Homes Stay

=== Music CD ===
- Dragon Poker Original Soundtrack
- Dreaming Now

=== Digital Comic ===
- Haru to Koi to Kimi no Koto (2020) as Hiroka Mishima

=== Overseas Dubbing ===
==== Movie ====
- Casablanca as Mrs. Reichtag (N.E.M. version)
- Dark Places as young Libby Day (Sterling Jerins)
- Fire City: End of Days as Sara
- KPop Demon Hunters as Zoey
- Leaves of Grass as Colleen (Melanie Lynskey)
- Night Swim as Izzy Walker (Amélie Hoeferle)
- Operasjon Arktis as Julia (Kaisa Gurine Antonsen)
- Plastic as Fionna (Amelle Berrabah)
- The Conjuring: The Devil Made Me Do It as David Glatzel (Julian Hilliard)
- The Curse of La Llorona as Samantha Garcia (Jaynee-Lynne Kinchen)
- Wonka as Waitress

==== Live Action TV ====
- Crusoe as Epi
- Lost in Space as Judy Robinson
- Two Weeks as Jang Young-ja

==== Animation ====
- Unstable Fables: Tortoise vs. Hare as Crystal Tortoise

==== Video games ====
- Life is Strange (2015) as Brooke Scott
- The Last of Us Part II (2020)

=== Narration ===
- NewGin Commercial Soreyuke Yasei no Ōkoku
- Panasonic Nanoi Humidified Air Purifier F-VXK90
- Sports Life Technology Lab
- Takara Tomy Disney & Disney/Pixar Characters Dekita! ga Ippai Dream Pad
- Tokyo Shoe Distribution Center

=== Voiceover ===
- News23

=== Commercials ===
- Shimajiman 2016
- Dengeki Bunko Magazine
- Nintendo 3DS My Melody: Negai ga Kanau Fushigi na Hako

=== Radio ===
- Rainbow Town FM Fun×Fun Tuesday ~Queen de Night~ (guest)

=== Stage ===
- Ayashikai Jitsu (March 28-April 2, 2018, Mottoi Fudō, Mitsuzōin)
- Don Giovanni as Zellina
- The World of Kenji Miyazawa as Calico Cat
- Remax Rookie Performance

=== Other ===
- Good Neighbors Japan Parent-Child Challenge International Understanding! Little Child Drawing Contest DVD as Daiki

== Discography ==
=== Character Songs ===
Release date	Title	Artist	Track listing	Note(s)
July 21, 2021	Hyakka Ryōransan	Shokudaikiri Mitsutada (Nao Shiraki), Tomita Gou (Madoka Yonezawa), Furiwakegami Hiromitsu (Miho Wataya)	"Entaku wa Roulette Janai kara"	Game "Tenka Hyakken -Zan-"-related Song
