= Boarding School Juliet =

Japanese manga series

- First tankōbon volume cover, featuring Juliet Persia

寄宿学校のジュリエット (Kishuku Gakkō no Jurietto)
- Genre: Romantic comedy
- Manga
- Written by: Yōsuke Kaneda
- Published by: Kodansha
- English publisher: NA: Kodansha USA
- Imprint: Shōnen Magazine Comics
- Magazine: Bessatsu Shōnen Magazine (July 9, 2015 – June 9, 2017); Weekly Shōnen Magazine (September 27, 2017 – September 4, 2019)
- Original run: July 9, 2015 – September 4, 2019
- Volumes: 16
- Light novel
- Written by: Tadahito Mochizuki
- Illustrated by: Yōsuke Kaneda
- Published by: Kodansha
- Published: February 9, 2017
- Anime television series
- Directed by: Seiki Takuno
- Produced by: Ayano Iida; Manami Ishida; Toshihiro Suzuki; Hiroyuki Aoi; Gouta Aijima; Tetsuro Satomi
- Written by: Takao Yoshioka
- Music by: Masaru Yokoyama
- Studio: Liden Films
- Licensed by: Amazon Prime Video (expired)
- Original network: JNN (TBS, MBS, BS-TBS) AT-X
- Original run: October 6, 2018 – December 22, 2018
- Episodes: 12
- icon

Boarding School Juliet (Japanese: 寄宿学校のジュリエット, Hepburn: Kishuku Gakkō no Jurietto), also known as Juliet of Boarding School, is a Japanese manga series written and illustrated by Yōsuke Kaneda. It was serialized in Kodansha's shōnen manga magazine Bessatsu Shōnen Magazine from July 2015 to June 2017, and later moved to Weekly Shōnen Magazine, where it ran from September 2017 to September 2019; its chapters were collected in 16 tankōbon volumes. The manga was licensed for English release in North America by Kodansha USA.

A light novel adaptation, written by Tadahito Mochizuki and illustrated by Kaneda, was published by Kodansha in February 2017. A 12-episode anime television series adaptation by Liden Films aired TBS and MBS's Animeism programming block from October to December 2018.

== Plot ==
Boarding School Juliet takes place at Dahlia Academy Boarding School, where students come from two fictional countries known as the "Nation of Tōwa" and "Principality of West". This academy segregates its student body into two dormitories, which reflect their nationality: the "Black Dogs" housing those from Touwa, and the "White Cats" housing those from the West. The story follows Romio Inuzuka, the first-year leader of the "Black Dog Dormitory". Romio has had an unrequited love for Juliet Persia, the first-year leader of the "White Cat Dormitory", since childhood. Initially hesitant, Romio decides to confess his love and resolves to change the world if it means staying by Juliet's side. Juliet, impressed by Romio's determination, accepts his love. However, now both Romio and Juliet must work hard to keep their relationship a secret from other dorm mates while trying to avoid trouble.

== Media ==
=== Manga ===
Written and illustrated by Yōsuke Kaneda, a one-shot chapter of Boarding School Juliet was first published in Kodansha's shōnen manga magazine Bessatsu Shōnen Magazine on December 9, 2014; it started its serialization in the same magazine on July 9, 2015. It was published in the magazine until June 9, 2017, and was then moved to Weekly Shōnen Magazine on September 27 of the same year. The series finished on September 4, 2019. Kodansha collected its chapters in 16 tankōbon volumes, released from November 9, 2015, to November 15, 2019.

In North America, the series was licensed in English for digital publication by Kodansha USA, who released the first volume under their Kodansha Comics imprint on April 10, 2018.

An anthology of chapters by various artists, titled Boarding School Juliet Official Comic Anthology (寄宿学校のジュリエット 公式アンソロジーコミック), was released on October 17, 2018.

==== Volumes ====
No.	Original release date	Original ISBN	English release date	English ISBN
1	November 9, 2015	978-4-06-395526-2	April 10, 2018 (digital); October 2, 2018 (print)	978-1-64-212217-6 (digital); 978-1-63-236750-1 (print)
1. Romio Inuzuka & Juliet Persia; 2. Rosary & Juliet; 3. Date & Juliet; 4. Romio & Princess Char; 5. Princess Char & Juliet; Boarding School Juliet ~Early Design Work~
2	April 8, 2016	978-4-06-395641-2	May 29, 2018 (digital); November 6, 2018 (print)	978-1-64-212242-8 (digital); 978-1-63-236752-5 (print)
6. Romio & Hasuki Part 1; 7. Romio & Hasuki Part 2; 8. Packed Lunch & Juliet; 9. Romio & The Sports Festival; 10. The Sports Festival & Juliet
3	September 9, 2016	978-4-06-395751-8	June 12, 2018 (digital); December 4, 2018 (print)	978-1-64-212280-0 (digital); 978-1-63-236753-2 (print)
11. Romio & Juliet & The Sports Festival; 12. Nursing & Juliet; 13. Romio & The Prefects; 14. Romio & Char & The Present; 15. Romio & Juliet & The Birthday I
4	February 9, 2017	978-4-06-395862-1	August 14, 2018 (digital); February 5, 2019 (print)	978-1-64-212420-0 (digital); 978-1-63-236754-9 (print)
16. Romio & Juliet & The Birthday II; 17. Romio & Juliet & The Birthday III; 18. Romio & Juliet & The Birthday IV; 19. Romio & Teria; 20. The Beach & Romio & Juliet I
5	August 9, 2017	978-4-06-510101-8; 978-4-06-510224-4 (LE)	October 9, 2018 (digital); April 2, 2019 (print)	978-1-64-212512-2 (digital); 978-1-63-236755-6 (print)
21. The Beach & Romio & Juliet II; 22. Chartreux & Juliet; 23. Romio & Somali; 24. Romio & Airu I 25. Romio & Airu II
6	December 15, 2017	978-4-06-510545-0	November 13, 2018 (digital); June 11, 2019 (print)	978-1-64-212540-5 (digital); 978-1-63-236785-3 (print)
26. Romio & Juliet & Dahlia Field; 27. Romio & The Photo; 28. Romio & Hasuki & Midterm Exams; 29. Princess Char & Juliet & The Fall Festival I 30. Princess Char & Juliet & The Fall Festival II; 31. Romio & Juliet & Hasuki I
7	March 16, 2018	978-4-06-511071-3	January 8, 2019 (digital); August 20, 2019 (print)	978-1-64-212606-8 (digital); 978-1-63-236786-0 (print)
32. Romio & Juliet & Hasuki II; 33. Romio & The Twins I 34. Romio & The Twins II; 35. Romio & Julio; 36. Romio & Siber; 37. Romio & Siber II; 38. Romio & Teria & The School Festival I 39. Romio & Teria & The School Festival II; 40. Romio & Maru & Julio I
8	June 15, 2018	978-4-06-511613-5	February 12, 2019 (digital); October 8, 2019 (print)	978-1-64-212675-4 (digital); 978-1-63-236830-0 (print)
41. Romio & Maru & Julio II; 42. Romio & Juliet & The School Festival I 43. Romio & Juliet & The School Festival II; 44. Romio & Juliet & The School Festival III; 45. Romio & Hasuki & Kogi I; 46. Romio & Hasuki & Kogi II; 47. Romio & Juliet & Chartreux; 48. Romio & Juliet & Touwa; 49. Romio & Juliet & The Inuzuka Family
9	September 14, 2018	978-4-06-512604-2; 978-4-06-513071-1 (LE)	March 26, 2019 (digital); December 10, 2019 (print)	978-1-64-212789-8 (digital); 978-1-63-236831-7 (print)
50. Romio & Shuna I 51. Romio & Shuna II; 52. Romio & Shuna III; 53. Romio & Mom I 54. Romio & Mom II; 54. Romio & Julio & Airu I 55. Romio & Julio & Airu II; 56. Romio & Julio & Airu III; 57. Romio & Julio & Airu IV
10	October 17, 2018	978-4-06-512995-1	May 28, 2019 (digital); February 4, 2020 (print)	978-1-64-212880-2 (digital); 978-1-63-236904-8 (print)
59. Romio & Juliet & The Touwa Date; 60. Romio & Reon; 61. Scott & Juliet; 62. Romio & The Prefect Assembly; 63. Romio & Hasuki & The Yeoman Job; 64. Romio & Princess Char & Coffee I 65. Romio & Princess Char & Coffee II; 66. Valentine's Day & Juliet I 67. Valentine's Day & Juliet II
11	December 17, 2018	978-4-06-513488-7; 978-4-06-514689-7 (LE)	July 23, 2019 (digital); April 7, 2020 (print)	978-1-64-212951-9 (digital); 978-1-63-236905-5 (print)
68. Romio & Reon & After-School Duties; 69. Romio & Teria & Final Exams; 70. Romio & The First Years I 71. Romio & The First Years II; 72. Romio & The First Years III; 73. Amelia & Juliet I 74. Amelia & Juliet II; 75. Romio & Amnesia I 76. Romio & Amnesia II
12	February 15, 2019	978-4-06-514128-1	September 3, 2019 (digital); August 4, 2020 (print)	978-1-64-212986-1 (digital); 978-1-63-236961-1 (print)
77. Romio & Amnesia III; 78. Romio & Amnesia IV; 79. Romio & Shuna & The Campaign Poster; 80. Romio & The School Assembly I 81. Romio & The School Assembly II; 82. Romio & Reon & The Secret I 83. Romio & Reon & The Secret II; 84. Julio & Black Doggy House; 85. Romio & Juliet & Election Day I
13	May 17, 2019	978-4-06-514886-0	November 26, 2019 (digital); December 22, 2020 (print)	978-1-64-659134-3 (digital); 978-1-63-236977-2 (print)
86. Romio & Juliet & Election Day II; 87. Romio & Juliet & Election Day III; 88. Romio & Juliet & Election Day IV; 89. Romio & Juliet & Election Day V 90. Romio & Reon & Prefectdom I; 91. Romio & Reon & Prefectdom II; 92. Romio & Juliet & The Lunch Date; 93. Romio & The Upperclassmen I 94. Romio & The Upperclassmen II
14	July 17, 2019	978-4-06-515311-6	January 28, 2020 (digital); May 04, 2021 (print)	978-1-64-659217-3 (digital); 978-1-64-651013-9 (print)
95. Romio & The Upperclassmen III; 96. Romio & The Upperclassmen IV; 97. Romio & Teria's Conclusion; 98. Romio & Juliet's Bedroom; 99. Romio & The Yeoman Wars I; 100. Romio & The Yeoman Wars II; 101. Romio & The Class Trip; 102. Romio & The Principality of West; 103. Hasuki & The Principality of West I
15	September 17, 2019	978-4-06-516450-1	March 24, 2020 (digital); June 22, 2021 (print)	978-1-64-659266-1 (digital); 978-1-64-651083-2 (print)
104. Hasuki & The Principality of West II; 105. Romio & The Hot Spring I 106. Romio & The Hot Spring II; 107. Romio & Reon & The Principality of West I 108. Romio & Reon & The Principality of West II; 109. Romio & Juliet & The Nostalgic Spot; 110. Romio & Turkish; 111. Juliet & Ragdoll; Bonus Act: Romio & Juliet & Halloween
16	November 15, 2019	978-4-06-517359-6; 978-4-06-517632-0 (LE)	July 28, 2020 (digital); August 10, 2021 (print)	978-1-64-659612-6 (digital); 978-1-64-651132-7 (print)
112. Romio & Juliet & Turkish I 113. Romio & Juliet & Turkish II; 114. Romio & Juliet & Turkish III; 115. Romio & Juliet & Turkish IV; 116. Romio & Princess Char & The Ball I; 117. Romio & Princess Char & The Ball II; 118. Romio & Juliet & Graduation; Act 118.5: Romio & The Gang 7 Years Later; Final Act: Romio & Juliet

=== Anime ===
An anime television series adaptation was announced in March 2018. The anime series is directed by Seiki Takuno and animated by Liden Films, with Takao Yoshioka written the scripts, Yūki Morimoto designed the characters and Masaru Yokoyama composed the music. The 12-episode series aired from October 6 to December 22, 2018, on TBS, MBS, and BS-TBS during the Animeism programming block. (Note: TBS listed the series air dates on Friday at 25:25, which is Saturday at 1:25 a.m. JST. It aired a half hour later on MBS.) The series was streamed on Amazon Prime Video in Japan and markets other than China. The series' opening theme is "Love With You" is performed by fripSide, and the ending theme is "Itsuka Sekai ga Kawaru Made" (いつか世界が変わるまで; lit. "Someday Until The World Changes") is performed by Riho Iida.

==== Episodes ====
No.	Title (Note: All English titles are taken from Amazon Video.)	Original release date
1	"Romio Inuzuka and Juliet Persia"; Transliteration: "Inuzuka Romio to Jurietto Perushia" (Japanese: 犬塚露壬雄とジュリエット・ペルシア)	October 6, 2018
At the Dahlia Academy Boarding School students are split into two factions, The White Cats and the Black Dogs. The White Cats first years are led by Juliet Persia and the Black Dogs first years are led by Romio Inuzuka. Violent fights between the factions are common. Inuzuka and Persia have been rivals since childhood but Inuzuka fell in love with Persia and has been secretly keeping her safe in every fight. Persia is angry that Inuzuka never fights her seriously. Inuzuka sees older White Cats bullying younger Black Dogs who are then protected by Persia. Inuzuka almost confesses his love but runs away instead. Three Black Dogs kidnap Persia to molest her. Inuzuka quickly saves her and the Black Dogs angrily leave. However, from Persia's point of view, it looks like Inuzuka was also trying to molest her, so she incorrectly views him as a creep and runs away crying. The three Black Dogs try to attack Inuzuka for stealing Persia from them so he beats them up. Persia sends Inuzuka a message to meet for a duel, to which she initially ignores. Inuzuka lies and claims he saved her out of pity which makes her cry and Inuzuka realises she hates appearing weak. Inuzuka realises he had unwittingly been undermining her goal of making the world better. As they duel Inuzuka finally confesses and asks to help her change the world. Persia responds by pushing him in the fountain but agrees to date him as long as he helps change the world and keep their relationship secret.
2	"Rosario and Juliet"; Transliteration: "Rozario to Jurietto" (Japanese: ロザリオとジュリエット)	October 13, 2018
Inuzuka tries to sneak Persia away but they are interrupted by Hasuki Komai, his second in command, and must pretend they are fighting. Inuzuka tries to give Persia a rosary as a love token but is caught by Scott Fold, Persia's second in command, who pushes him off a building. Upon awakening Hasuki informs him the Dogs are attacking Persia. While looking for Persia he accidentally breaks the rosary and uses a statue to beat both the Cats and the Dogs. As punishment he is forced to pick weeds around the school lake. Persia accepts the broken rosary and gives him her personal rosary in return. Inuzuka tries to refuse as her rosary has sentimental value, upsetting Persia enough to drop him in the lake. Inuzuka asks Persia on a date so she disguises herself as a male Black Dog, causing Hasuki to suspect Inuzuka is homosexual. Many Black Dogs try to be her friend so Inuzuka claims she is Julio, his cousin. A silver haired White Cat recognises Persia despite the disguise. Inuzuka takes Persia to a haunted house which scares her into running away. Inuzuka is pushed into the ocean by Chizuru Maru, one of the Black Dogs who tried to molest Persia. Persia beats Maru in a fight and rescues Inuzuka. Inuzuka is happy Persia considers their date a success because they learned more about each other, though they are again interrupted by Scott and resume fake fighting. The silver haired White Cat realises Inuzuka and Persia are dating.
3	"Romio and Princess Char"; Transliteration: "Romio to sharu hime" (Japanese: 露壬雄とシャル姫)	October 20, 2018
Inuzuka asks Persia on a date for their 1 month anniversary. White Cat Princess Char, the Tyrant Princess of the West, is returning after a year's absence. Inuzuka almost hits her after she provokes him, until she reveals she has photographs proving he is dating Persia and blackmails him into becoming her servant. Inuzuka agrees, knowing that if their relationship is revealed Persia will lose her leadership of the Cats. Maru plans to punish Inuzuka for his betrayal. Persia becomes jealous of Inuzuka spending time with Char. Inuzuka refuses to reveal the blackmail to Persia but assures her he is keeping her safe. Persia, unused to seeing Inuzuka so downtrodden, reminds him they still have their anniversary date. Inuzuka becomes determined to defeat Char. Inuzuka is thrown out of the Black Dogs dormitory by Maru's gang. Inuzuka discovers Char is Persia's childhood friend and is sharing a room with Persia. Inuzuka searches the room and finds Char's Persia collection behind a mirror, revealing Char is in love with Persia. Char is desperate to keep her feelings secret from Persia, who suddenly arrives at the room. Inuzuka hides the photographs and himself behind the mirror until Persia leaves. As Inuzuka now has material to blackmail Char they form an uneasy truce. Inuzuka rushes to their date and sees Persia had his broken rosary repaired and is wearing it.
4	"Romio and Hasuki"; Transliteration: "Romio to Hasuki" (Japanese: 露壬雄と蓮季)	October 27, 2018
As Midterm Exams approaches, the Black Dogs begin a 72-hour study session with Persia disguised as Julio. Maru is revealed to have a crush on Julio after Julio defeated him to save Inuzuka, not knowing Julio is Persia in disguise. The session is led by Hasuki who has the best grades. Inuzuka helps Persia sneak out but is caught by Hasuki who worries he is keeping secrets. Char warns him of the risk Hasuki poses. Inuzuka insists Hasuki is his best friend and would keep his secret if she found out. Maru asks Hasuki why she likes Inuzuka and she reveals that Inuzuka helped her make friends. Inuzuka overhears so she confesses she loves him. Realising he cannot lie to her he reveals he is dating Persia. Hasuki overreacts, tries to force him to commit suicide then tries to behead him when he flees. Persia follows them into the woods where Hasuki almost kills her but is stopped by Char who admits she knew Persia was dating Inuzuka. Inuzuka feels worthless as he cannot even be honest with his best friend. Persia assures him he is just as strong as the day he confessed to her. Inuzuka allows Hasuki to attack him, claiming he will never stop being her friend, surviving only because her sword was a replica. Persia falls into the river so Inuzuka jumps after her. Inuzuka, who cannot swim, is saved by Hasuki while Char saves Persia. Hasuki claims she still hates him but decides they are still friends, though she will behead him if he flirts with Persia in front of her.
5	"Romio and the Sports Festival"; Transliteration: "Romio to taiikumatsuri" (Japanese: 露壬雄と体育祭)	November 3, 2018
Inuzuka asks Persia to make a bento, not knowing she is a terrible cook. Char, who has never tried Persia's cooking, steals it but accidentally drops it on Scott who believes Persia made the bento for him. Inuzuka defeats Scott but loses the bento which is eaten by pigs. Char drags Scott away for further torment. Persia admits a kitchen maid actually made the bento. Inuzuka assures her she does not have to act perfect when they are alone. Persia swears to one day make a perfect bento. Char amuses herself with her new victim, Scott. Maru warns Inuzuka to quit the sports festival since the Dogs once lost to the Cats when Inuzuka made a mistake during the 100m race. Hasuki hears a rumour that anyone who dances with the festival MVP will become their lover and decides to win MVP and dance with Inuzuka. Scott plans to win MVP and dance with Persia. Inuzuka is stopped from hitting him by Somali Longhaired, a White Cat with superhuman strength. Her friend and crush, Aby Ssinia, asks Persia to become his girlfriend if he wins MVP. This causes a fight until Persia intervenes. Persia asks Inuzuka for help practicing for the three legged race so she can win MVP and increase her popularity, though really she was helping Inuzuka get over his defeat in the previous festival. They decide that if either of them wins MVP the loser must obey one order from the winner. Inuzuka becomes highly motivated and enters the 100m race again.
6	"Juliet and the Sports Festival"; Transliteration: "Jurietto to taiikumatsuri" (Japanese: ジュリエットと体育祭)	November 10, 2018
Inuzuka decides he will order Persia to call him by his first name, Romio. During the first half of the festival, through rampant cheating, the Dogs and Cats score equal points. Persia tells Inuzuka her mother is watching from the audience and Inuzuka is surprised that she wants him to meet her mother someday. Somali injures Persia on Aby's orders and during her next race against Hasuki the injury causes Persia to trip. Aby and his allies blame Persia for being a weak girl. The audience ridicules Persia as she is forced to leave for treatment. Inuzuka is furious that he couldn't help Persia when she needed him and is further enraged when Char explains Aby is trying to steal Persia's leadership of the Cats and decides to destroy Aby in the final event, the Cavalry Battle. The Dogs begin losing due to Aby having drugged most of them. Maru initially refuses to cooperate as Inuzuka's horse for the event, until Persia arrives disguised as Julio, which inspires Maru, and they eliminate all White Cats except Aby and Somali. Inuzuka calls out Aby for his underhanded tactics. Somali attacks Maru but is stopped by Inuzuka who finds proof that Somali's spiked shoes injured Persia so he throws Aby into the audience, defeating him. Before the referee declares the Dogs the winners Inuzuka demands Persia fight him as well or he could never claim to have beaten all the White Cats. Persia, happy that Inuzuka is treating her as an equal, returns to fight him.
7	"Romio and Juliet and the Sports Festival"; Transliteration: "Romio to Jurietto to taiikumatsuri" (Japanese: 露壬雄とジュリエットと体育祭)	November 17, 2018
Persia and Inuzuka battle for victory and the crowd begin cheering for Persia again. Inuzuka almost grabs Persia's ribbon but accidentally grabs her breast, suffers a nosebleed and faints. The Cats are declared victors with Persia winning MVP. Inuzuka is replaced as the Dogs leader by Hasuki. Later at the party Persia sneaks away and asks Inuzuka to dance with her. A month later the Student Council discuss the issues raised during the festival and decide to monitor Inuzuka. Meanwhile Inuzuka, who has not seen Persia for a whole month, develops a fever from the stress of losing his position, so Persia sneaks in to see him disguised as Julio. She is waylaid by Maru who begins asking her awkward questions. She runs away but stumbles into the female baths where she is mistaken for a pervert. She makes it back to Inuzuka's room to change her wet clothes but when Eigo Kohitsuji, one of Maru's delinquents, tries to retrieve a porn magazine he left in Inuzuka's room Persia hides in Inuzuka's bed while still half naked, making his fever worse. He eventually recovers and Persia admits she was unaware he had a fever when she first arrived; the real reason she snuck in was because she missed him just as much as he missed her.
8	"Romio and the Prefect"; Transliteration: "Romio to Purifekuto" (Japanese: 露壬雄と監督生)	November 24, 2018
The Harvest Festival is approaching and twin Black Dog prefects Kocho and Teria are in charge of discipline. Inuzuka invites Persia and she agrees but refuses to dress as Julio in case Maru spots her. Inuzuka meets Kocho and Teria who reveal they almost heard him talking to Persia. They search Inuzuka's room and find Persia's rosary. They conclude the rosary has a secret meaning and decide to find out what. At the festival Persia and Inuzuka meet up but are forced to hide from the twins. Inuzuka witnesses the twins subduing two violent students and challenges them to beat him at the festival games. After he loses he promises they can challenge him again whenever they want, as he realised the twins wanted to attend the festival but had no friends to go with. They happily agree to challenge him again one day. Inuzuka rushes back to Persia but is too late to watch the fireworks with her, though Persia is happy she saw his softer side while he was playing with the twins. The twins wonder how much trouble Inuzuka might cause if he became a prefect at the next elections. It is revealed a high ranking member of the student council is Inuzuka's older brother, Airu Inuzuka.
9	"Romio and Char and the Present"; Transliteration: "Romio to Sharu to purezento" (Japanese: 露壬雄とシャルとプレゼント)	December 1, 2018
Persia asks Char for a favour for her birthday. Inuzuka plans to buy Persia a present and tricks the twins into giving him permission to go shopping. He bumps into Char but a police officer warns them that radicals from Touwa, Inuzuka's home country, are nearby and demands Char return to school, so Char forces Inuzuka to be her bodyguard. The twins discuss Inuzuka's rosary and are overheard by Inuzuka's brother, Airu. Char tries to manipulate Inuzuka into breaking up with Persia so he scolds her. Char recalls the only other person who ever scolded her was Persia. She is accosted by radicals who assume Inuzuka, a fellow Touwan will help them, but he saves Char instead, since Persia would cry if Char were hurt. Char admits she was jealous as Persia's favour was for Char to help her spend her birthday with Inuzuka. Inuzuka asks Persia what present she wants and she asks for matching couples accessories. Char believes Persia and Inuzuka are destined to break up and worries about what to do when it happens, then torments Scott to cheer herself up. Inuzuka returns to his room and finds Hasuki there, along with the twins and his brother.
10	"Romio and Airu"; Transliteration: "Romio to Airu" (Japanese: 露壬雄と藍瑠)	December 8, 2018
Airu confronts Inuzuka with the rosary and warns him that if Inuzuka is in contact with a White Cat girl he will expel and then disinherit him. He then personally supervises Inuzuka for 7 days. Inuzuka reveals to the twins that Airu used to beat him when they were children. Persia finally makes perfect cookies for Inuzuka but becomes worried that he is always with his brother and more downtrodden than ever. Airu forces Inuzuka to resume kendo training and beats him mercilessly. Inuzuka reveals to Hasuki he was tricking Airu into lowering his guard so he can see Persia on her birthday. Persia confronts Hasuki and demands to know what is wrong with Inuzuka. Inuzuka sneaks out but is caught by Airu. He tries to stand up to him but is knocked unconscious and locked in a shed. However, Inuzuka had known Airu would lock him in a shed and had convinced the twins to defy Airu by opening the shed once Airu left. Inuzuka rushes to Persia but collapses from his injuries; however Persia makes it in time and catches him. She tearfully apologises for everything that has happened to him because of their relationship.
11	"Romio and Juliet and the Birthday"; Transliteration: "Romio to Jurietto to tanjōbi" (Japanese: 露壬雄とジュリエットと誕生日)	December 15, 2018
The Cats are on guard against Inuzuka as his yearly tradition is to crash Persia's birthday party and throw cream pie in her face. Persia starts avoiding Inuzuka so he won't be hurt again, causing him to become depressed. Persia tells Char everything that happened and how she cannot bring herself to be near Inuzuka. Char gives Inuzuka the cookies Persia made. After eating them Inuzuka can taste the effort Persia put in to them and decides to keep up his tradition for Persia's birthday. Persia goes to the White Cat members of the student council for advice, but before she can ask Inuzuka and the Black Dogs invade the party with pies. Inuzuka is caught by Somali and Aby, but tricks Somali into restraining Aby. Before Aby can get revenge Inuzuka escapes and is helped to avoid detection by White Cat Cait Sith. He decides to help Inuzuka for making life in the school interesting and reveals he put Persia in the 4th floor storeroom. They are caught by Anne Sieber, Student Council secretary, and with his identity as a prefect revealed Cait Sith tells Inuzuka it is now his job to stop him reaching Persia. Meanwhile Persia tries to escape by climbing out the 4th floor window.
12	"Romio and Juliet"; Transliteration: "Romio to Jurietto" (Japanese: 露壬雄とジュリエット)	December 22, 2018
Inuzuka jumps out of the window, having realised Persia was on the balcony and she catches him. Inuzuka finally wishes Persia Happy Birthday and Persia admits she loves him. Airu arrives but before he can locate Inuzuka, he and Persia pie each other in the face and declare their fight a draw. However, Airu publicly confronts Inuzuka with Persia's rosary and other evidence and accuses them of being lovers. Persia quickly accuses Inuzuka of trying to make a fool of her and challenges him to duel with real swords. Airu still does not believe them so Inuzuka and Persia decide they must actually wound each other to stay together and stab each other in the chest. Later it is revealed they actually stabbed each other in the rosaries they were both wearing, destroying them. With the school now convinced they're enemies Inuzuka secretly gives Persia matching rings and declares that before changing the world he will change the school by becoming a prefect. The school returns to normal. Airu, despite still being suspicious, allows Inuzuka to become a student council errand boy as his first step on the road towards becoming a prefect. On their next secret date while wearing their matching rings Persia and Inuzuka decide that one day, when they have nothing to fear, they will call each other by their first names, Romio and Juliet.

== Reception ==
In 2017, the series was ranked 14th at the third Next Manga Awards in the print category.

== See also ==
- The Classroom of a Black Cat and a Witch, another manga series by the same author
