= List of Classroom of the Elite characters =

This is a list of characters for the light novel, manga and anime series, Classroom of the Elite.

== Class-D students (former) ==
Kiyotaka Ayanokōji (綾小路 清隆, Ayanokōji Kiyotaka)
Voiced by: Shōya Chiba (Japanese); Justin Briner (English)
An unmotivated student who is very poor at communicating with others. His grades are intentionally average and he is very conscious of how he spends his points. It is revealed that he has the academic aptitude and true intellect to make it to the top class if he wanted to, but for some reason, he aimed to get into Class-D. It was mentioned by Chabashira Sensei that he intentionally got 50 out of 100 points for every subject on the entrance exam. Despite not exhibiting any kind of fitness regimen, he is incredibly well-built and is seen as very skilled in martial arts, such that he held his own in a fight against the Student Council President, and beat Kakeru Ryūen and three other very skilled fighters in Class-C all at once. He is also shown to be extremely intelligent as he comes up with various grand schemes that fool and use almost everyone in the school. In a flashback, it is shown that he was part of an experiment performed by an unknown organization which is owned by his father, in an unknown facility called the "White Room" that forced children to participate in an immense battery of tests designed to raise and train children into teens with almost superhuman-like capabilities and he's shown to be the only one who meets all the criteria. He prefers to stay in the background and use other people to implement his plans whenever necessary. He is considered an unreliable narrator due to his ambiguous way of narrating with conditional statements and omitting vital information. Later on, he begins dating Kei Karuizawa, whom he appears to have romantic feelings for.
Suzune Horikita (堀北 鈴音, Horikita Suzune)
Voiced by: Akari Kitō (Japanese); Felecia Angelle (English)
A selfish student with intellectual beauty, who secretly harbors a softer side by her so called brother. She joins Kiyotaka in class and is also careful about how she spends her points. Like Kiyotaka, she has trouble communicating with others but unlike him, she thinks friends are unnecessary. Kiyotaka is the only student in her class that she talks to and confides in him, as she seems to express interest in his insightful yet mysterious personality and has her doubts about him and his mysterious past, believing that he is hiding more than he actually lets on. She is seen as one of the most beautiful girls at school, and is constantly the target of many boys' affection, though she always turns them down. Her brother, Manabu, studies in the same school as her and is the former student council president, who distances himself from her due to the embarrassment that she is placed in Class-D. She also has knowledge of martial arts, as she was seen fighting Mio Ibuki, a Class-C student and held her own against her, despite being ill at the time. Her attitude seemingly improves for the better as she acknowledges her own hypocrisy by admitting that she is no different from her classmates when faced with a serious down-sided problem.
Kikyo Kushida (櫛田 桔梗, Kushida Kikyō)
Voiced by: Yurika Kubo (Japanese); Sarah Wiedenheft (English)
An attractive and popular girl in Class-D has a seemingly nice and cheerful personality and is also looking to befriend everybody at the school. However, behind her cheerful and caring façade, she has an alternate personality that is violent, cold-blooded, detestable and manipulative. She shows deep resentment towards Suzune, and yet she wants to get closer to her for an unknown reason. In the light novels, she was revealed to be from the same middle school as Suzune and assumed that she found out about her dark past. It is strongly implied that she may be developing feelings for Kiyotaka, though remains in denial and does not know how to properly understand them.
Airi Sakura (佐倉 愛里, Sakura Airi)
Voiced by: M.A.O (Japanese); Leah Clark (English)
A beautiful but timid young photographer and former model who joined Class-D, due to her fear and nervousness, causing her to have difficulties communicating and interacting with others. She dislikes standing out and likes to take modeling pictures. Despite her insecurities, she is actually quite popular, and is the target of many boys' affections, although she always rejects them. She was originally revealed to be a gravure idol, until her life was in danger of being chased by a stalker who worked in an electronics store and attempted to assault her, causing her unable to stand out anymore for the rest of her life. Fortunately, Kiyotaka and Honami came on time, saving her life and the stalker was arrested by the police, thanks to the security cameras located around the campus and the GPS tracking system on each students' school cellphones. She then feels deeply indebted to Kiyotaka, causing her to have an admiration/romantic interest for him for saving her while inspiring her with his encouraging words of wisdom to always do more than she would have done.
Kei Karuizawa (軽井沢 恵, Karuizawa Kei)
Voiced by: Ayana Taketatsu (Japanese); Bryn Apprill (English)
One of the top students in Class-D, who has issues with bullying. In the light novels, she initially perceives Kiyotaka as boring and nothing special, but slowly forms a very close trusting bond with him. She notices that he has a dark mysterious side that he does not want people to know about, where he appears to know her past issues and helps her to break the past, and is shown to trust her more so than others and in volume 6 of the light novel, she is shown to develop a crush on Kiyotaka, who seems to reciprocate. Later in the series, she is the only one who remembered and celebrated his birthday causing Kiyotaka to hesitate on deleting her messages, which he usually does and he also learned of her birthday and decided to do the same for her. She and Kiyotaka also call each other by their first names, also showing how close they are. Her developing crush on him was also shown, as she was seen very jealous of Maya Sato, due to the latter's confession to Kiyotaka. In later volumes, she gets confessed by Kiyotaka and they become a couple.
Yosuke Hirata (平田 洋介, Hirata Yōsuke)
Voiced by: Ryōta Ōsaka (Japanese); Dallas Reid (English)
The top student in Class-D. His grades are worthy of being in a higher class, but he ended up getting stuck in Class-D for reasons yet to be explained. He is in a "relationship" with Karuizawa, although in the light novels this was revealed to be a ruse and a cover-up so that she does not get bullied in school. It was hinted in the light novels, that Hirata begins to suspect Kiyotaka for his manipulations and usage of others while taking advantage of transpired events through various grand schemes that gradually ends up helping Class-D and doing it so subtly behind the shadows unbeknownst to others who are seemingly unaware of what goes on.
Rokusuke Koenji (高円寺 六助, Kōenji Rokusuke)
Voiced by: Toshiki Iwasawa (Japanese); Christopher Wehkamp (English)
He is a narcissist, who is from a prestigious well-known family of scholars, as he is equipped with great physical abilities and intelligence, however, he ended up in Class-D for being too arrogant and egotistical, making him unable to work with others. Unlike his fellow students, however, who are struggling to obtain enough points, he does not worry about it since his rich family can simply buy the necessary points needed for his use.
Ken Sudo (須藤 健, Sudō Ken)
Voiced by: Eiji Takeuchi (Japanese); Brandon McInnis (English)
One of the "3 Idiots of Class-D" and a basketball team player for the club. Although he has the best athletic ability compared to his classmates, he has a very poor intelligence, a short temper, and a thin skin-like personality making him easily angered and provoked, which had it not been for Suzune and Kiyotaka's intervention, would have gotten him expelled twice. His personality was seen to improve a little though he still acts rough towards others and he is seen to have feelings for Horikita. In the light novels, he is shown to be quite close to Kiyotaka and it is revealed that both are actually close friends. In the sports festival in volume 5 of the light novel, he seems to have formed a close bond with Suzune, and is implied to have a crush on her.
Kanji Ike (池 寛治, Ike Kanji)
Voiced by: Daiki Abe (Japanese); Aaron Dismuke (English)
One of the "3 Idiots of Class-D", who has poor intelligence, though his communication skills and experiences in camping are excellent. He is also shown to be in love with Kushida, who does not reciprocate his feelings.
Haruki Yamauchi (山内 春樹, Yamauchi Haruki)
Voiced by: Mutsuki Iwanaka (Japanese); Travis Mullenix (English)
One of the "3 Idiots of Class-D" with lying tendencies. He also has a crush on both Kushida and Sakura. In the spin-off volume of the light novel, he confesses to Sakura, but gets rejected due to her inability and uneasiness to cope with the uncomfortable situation and her admiration for Kiyotaka. Yamauchi is expelled from school for having most negative votes, despite his warning to the class.
Teruhiko Yukimura (幸村 輝彦, Yukimura Teruhiko)
Voiced by: Tsubasa Gōda (Japanese); Jessie James Grelle (English)
A boy with great intelligence. Despite his academic ability, his poor athletic ability landed him in Class-D. In the light novel volume 6, he is a member of Kiyotaka's study group (would prefer to be called "Keisei"). He appears to have romantic feelings for Suzune, although she never notices him.
Maya Sato (佐藤 麻耶, Sato Maya)
Voiced by: Lynn (Japanese); Michelle Rojas (English)
A girl in Kiyotaka's class who has taken a liking to him, though he does not show any interest in her. After he rejects her, she is able to move on and only see him as another classmate.
Kazuomi Hosen (宝泉 和臣, Hosen Kazuomi)
Voiced by: Hiroya Egashira (Japanese); Bradley Gareth (English)
A first year student in Class 1-D who uses physical dominance to control his class and threaten others. He tried to expel Ayanokoji for the 20-million private point bounty but failed.
Tsubasa Nanase (七瀬 翼, Nanase Tsubasa)
Voiced by: Minako Sato (Japanese); Reshel Mae (English)
A first year student in Class 1-D. After her childhood friend, Eiichiro Matsuo committed suicide, she attended Advanced Nurturing High School to expel Kiyotaka as she believed that it was his fault that he died. However, she is comforted by Kiyotaka.

== Class-C students (former) ==
Kakeru Ryuen (龍園 翔, Ryūen Kakeru)
Voiced by: Masaaki Mizunaka (Japanese); Eric Vale (English)
A student under Class-C who has a reputation of being a feared delinquent, where he rules the class like a mafia boss and has a group of henchmen who do his dirty work.
Mio Ibuki (伊吹 澪, Ibuki Mio)
Voiced by: Mikako Komatsu (Japanese); Jamie Marchi (English)
A student under Class-C, who despises Ryūen's dirty reputation as an infamous delinquent. She lacks academic ability, but her physical one is not to be underestimated. She is skilled in combat, having the knowledge of several martial skills that can rival those of many martial artists. After learning Suzune was the arsonist, Mio defeats her by stealing her key card and delivering it to Ryuen. She was revealed to be a spy for her class, sent to infiltrate Class-D on Ryuen's orders, however she was manipulated, controlled and played by Kiyotaka along with both Ryuen and Katsuragi from Class-A, causing their plan to fall in shambles earning their class a huge loss.
Albert Yamada (山田 アルベルト, Yamada Aruberuto)
Voiced by: Ricky (Japanese); Jeremy Woods (English)
An Afro-Japanese student and one of Ryūen's henchmen. He is the only character not to speak Japanese, as he only uses English in the series. He is a tall, muscular and will do anything if Ryūen suggests him.
Hiyori Shiina (椎名 ひより, Shiina Hiyori)
Voiced by: Rie Takahashi (Japanese); Veronica Laux (English)
A second-year student who was in Class 1-C and a freshman. She is close to Kiyotaka because they share the same hobby, reading.
Shiho Manabe (真鍋 志保, Manabe Shiho)
Voiced by: Miyu Tomita (Japanese); Molly Searcy (English)
A second-year student in Class 1-C. She first appeared in the cruise ship, where she bullies and accuses Karuizawa for shoving Rika Morofuji in the cafeteria. Manabe is expelled from school after receiving negative votes.

== Class-B students ==
Honami Ichinose (一之瀬 帆波, Ichinose Honami)
Voiced by: Nao Tōyama (Japanese); Kristi Rothrock (English)
The Class Representative of Class-B, and a very beautiful, kind and self-less girl who likes to help anyone in need. She is one of the top students in her class and is very much admired and respected. However, unlike most other students who despise students from the lower classes, she is down-to-earth and is also friends with some of them like Kushida, Sakura and Kiyotaka. She obtained a huge number of private points through unknown means, and seemed secretive about it, causing Kiyotaka to wonder about how she got that many points. She also expressed her interest in Kiyotaka's true abilities and true intelligence by even wondering about it, more specifically on why he hides his true talents from others. In the light novels, she becomes a member of the Student Council and she is seen to have a close friendship with Kiyotaka, whom she occasionally teases and flirts with, as they are seen to get along very well and work well together. However, Kiyotaka spread the rumors about her huge number of points, which were revealed to be legally obtained by her, to trap Kakeru Ryūen from Class-C, though the latter caught on to it and decided to play along in order to find the true mastermind of Class-D. Although initially she was not interested in him, she later develops romantic feelings for Kiyotaka after realizing how unique he is to her and confesses but is rejected because of him already having a girlfriend.
Ryuji Kanzaki (神崎 隆二, Kanzaki Ryūji)
Voiced by: Akihisa Wakayama (Japanese); Ricco Fajardo (English)
A student of Class-B. He seems to be quite intelligent and friendly, and alongside Ichinose, did not mind lending a helping hand to Kiyotaka on proving Sudo's innocence in the Class-C's violent incident case. He is secretly in love with Ichinose, but does not make it public out of fear of her rejecting him.

== Class-A students ==
Arisu Sakayanagi (坂柳 有栖, Sakayanagi Arisu)
Voiced by: Rina Hidaka (Japanese); Trina Nishimura (English)
The main leader of Class-A, who appears to be disabled, causing her to walk with a cane. She is shown to be highly intelligent, as she seems to have very high knowledge of the school rules and the S-system. Ryuen from Class-C mentions how she is still acting as the "Queen" of the school for being in Class-A. There is an intense rivalry between her and Ryuen alongside their respective classes as she thinks his challenges against Class-A are interesting but ultimately futile. In volume 5 of the light novel, she was revealed to know about the "White Room" and cryptically reveals that she knows Kiyotaka, where she met him 8 years and 243 days ago in the past. According to her, she knows him very well and everything about his mysterious past though he denied knowledge of her and does not seem to remember her. In volume 7 of the light novel, Mr. Sakayanagi, Chairman of the School Board and an old acquaintance of Kiyotaka's father, confirms that Arisu is his daughter, thus explaining in part why she has observed Kiyotaka in person behind the window in the White Room.
Kohei Katsuragi (葛城 康平, Katsuragi Kōhei)
Voiced by: Satoshi Hino (Japanese); Jarrod Greene (English)
An intelligent man and the most well-respected student of Class-A. He takes on full responsibility of the class. For some reason, he has a troubled past on being rejected from the student council for his unknown failures.
Yahiko Totsuka (戸塚 弥彦, Totsuka Yahiko)
Voiced by: Daisuke Motohashi (Japanese); Orion Pitts (English)
A student of Class 1-A and a member of Katsuragi Faction. He is a student of the upper classes, comes off as rather egotistical and condescending, and dislikes the lower classes students even calling them trash. He is later expelled from school after receiving negative votes.
Miyabi Nagumo (南雲 雅, Nagumo Miyabi)
Voiced by: Soma Saito (Japanese); Nazeeh Tarsha (English)
A student of Class 3-A and the current president replacing Manabu.

== Student council ==
Manabu Horikita (堀北 学, Horikita Manabu)
Voiced by: Yūichirō Umehara (Japanese); David Matranga (English)
Suzune's older brother and the school's former student council president. He is highly respected to the upper echelons of the school student society. However, he resents Suzune for being in the lower class as her presence threatens his reputation in the student council. Manabu is shown to be a very serious and intelligent man, who is attached to his role as the Student Council President and is shown to be quite skilled in martial arts as seen in his skirmish with Kiyotaka. Manabu takes an interest with him as a worthy opponent. After graduating, Manabu leaves the school.
Akane Tachibana (橘 茜, Tachibana Akane)
Voiced by: Konomi Kohara (Japanese); Apphia Yu (English)
The Student Council Secretary and Manabu's assistant.

== Faculty Members ==
Sae Chabashira (茶柱 佐枝, Chiyabashira Sae)
Voiced by: Rina Satō (Japanese); Jennifer Alyx (English)
A homeroom teacher of Class-D who is very cold and apathetic to her own class though she can be bribed for the right price where she was willing to sell a grade to a student who is in danger of being expelled. She is the one to know the truth behind Class-D's designation for the students with defective aspects and Kiyotaka's hidden potential as the "most defective" and an excellent student in Class-D. She threatens him to have him expelled if he does not ascend to Class-A immediately, for holding back his true ability and true intelligence. It is unknown why she wants him to ascend to a higher class. One possible reason could be that she probably feels like he is wasting his true talents by being in the lowest class instead of being at the top class which he deserves. She, later on, revealed to Kiyotaka that it was his father's wish to be expelled and that his father stated that Kiyotaka will choose expulsion of his own free will.
Chie Hoshinomiya (星之宮 知恵, Hoshinomiya Chie)
Voiced by: Hisako Kanemoto (Japanese); Sara Ragsdale (English)
A homeroom teacher in Class-B, with a reputation for being a klutz and a drunkard. In spite of her quirks, she appears to be insightful as she recognized that Kiyotaka, whom she never met may present a problem for her class based on what Ichinose told her about him. In the light novels, she has formed a close bond with Kiyotaka, whom she teases and even flirts with him despite being a teacher, though he is shown to be a little put-off by her eccentric behavior.
Chairman Sakayanagi (坂柳, Sakayanagi)
Voiced by: Mitsuru Miyamoto
The Chairman of the school and the former secretary to Professor Ayanokouji. His previous position saw him and his daughter Arisu observing Kiyotaka in the White Room. Although he abides with the law, he also cares for his students. He is later suspended for unknown reasons.
Tokinari Tsukishiro (月城 常成, Tsukishiro Tokinari)
Voiced by: Ryōta Takeuchi
The temporarily new Chairman of the school. He was sent by Professor Ayanokoji in order to lure his son out from school.

== Other ==
Professor Ayanokouji (綾小路, Ayanokōji)
Voiced by: Yasunori Masutani (Japanese); Christopher Sabat (English)
Kiyotaka's abusive father and an apathetic person. He is the man who controls the White Room, which was used to train Kiyotaka when he was still a child. He is upset when his son was admitted without his knowledge, as he treasures Kiyotaka as a powerful weapon for his unknown ambitions. He tries to persuade his son to quit the school, but the rules prevent him from doing so. Nonetheless, he still seeks way to lure his son from school, using even the cruelest means.
