= Chisaki Morishita =

Japanese voice actress

- 森下 千咲
- Born: February 12; Kanagawa Prefecture, Japan
- Occupation: Voice actress
- Years active: 2016–present
- Agent: Aptepro

Chisaki Morishita (森下 千咲, Morishita Chisaki; born February 12) is a Japanese voice actress who is affiliated with Aptepro. She made her voice acting debut in 2016, and in 2019 played her first named and first main role as Bocchi Hitori, the protagonist of the anime television series Hitori Bocchi no Marumaru Seikatsu.

== Biography ==
Morishita initially aspired to become a novelist, but eventually decided to pursue a career in voice acting instead due to her interest in anime. After passing an audition with the talent agency Aptepro, she began training as a voice actress while also pursuing university studies; she became affiliated with the company in 2016. She then played background roles in anime television series such as Harukana Receive and Mitsuboshi Colors. In 2019, she was cast as Bocchi Hitori, the protagonist of the anime series Hitori Bocchi no Marumaru Seikatsu; it was the first time she played a named or main role. Morishita sang the show's opening theme "Hitori Bocchi no Monologue" (ひとりぼっちのモノローグ; "Lonely Monologue") with her co-stars, and she sang the ending theme "Ne, Issho ni Kaero" (ね、いっしょにかえろ。; "Let's Go Home Together"). alone.

== Filmography ==
=== Anime ===
2017

- A Sister's All You Need as Anime narration (episode 6)

2018

- Mitsuboshi Colors as Couple woman (episode 3)
- Harukana Receive as Girl A (episode 4)

2019

- Hitori Bocchi no Marumaru Seikatsu as Bocchi Hitori
- Kiratto Pri Chan as Girl

2021

- Life Lessons with Uramichi Oniisan as Child

=== Video games ===
- Genjūhime (2016) as Momotarō
- Sōkū no Liberation (2017)
- Megido 72 (2017) as Rune
- Uchi no Hime-sama ga Ichiban Kawaii as Natalia
- Kurokishi to Shiro no Maou as Jack Frost
- Release the Spyce: Secret Fragrance (2019)
- Yuki Yuna is a Hero: Hanayui no Kirameki (2019)
- Seven's Code as Geruta
- ASTRA: Knights of Veda (2024) as Xanthia
