= Konomi Kohara =

Japanese voice actress (born 1992)

- 小原 好美
- Born: June 28, 1992 (age 34); Kanagawa Prefecture, Japan
- Occupations: Actress; voice actress
- Years active: 2012–present
- Agent: Office Osawa
- Notable work: Tsuki ga Kirei as Akane Mizuno; Star Twinkle PreCure as Lala Hagoromo/Cure Milky; Teasing Master Takagi-san as Mina Hibino; Asobi Asobase as Kasumi Nomura; Blue Archive as Arona and Plana; Kaguya-sama: Love Is War as Chika Fujiwara; The Demon Girl Next Door as Yūko Yoshida / Shamiko; Mushoku Tensei as Roxy Migurdia

Konomi Kohara (小原 好美, Kohara Konomi; born June 28, 1992) is a Japanese actress who specializes in voice acting. She is affiliated with Office Osawa.

== Biography ==
Having been interested in anime since junior high, Kohara enrolled into Human Academy after graduating from high school to pursue her dream of becoming a voice actress. After a two-year stint as an actress from 2012 to 2014, she joined Office Osawa. She made her voice acting debut in 2016. Her first major breakthrough came in 2017 with the role of Akane Mizuno in Tsuki ga Kirei. In 2019, she voiced Chika Fujiwara in Kaguya-sama: Love Is War. Chikatto Chika Chika♡, her character's dance song she sang at the end of episode 3 became hugely popular, surpassing 20 million views on YouTube in just 18 months. Her song won Best Ending Sequence at the 4th Crunchyroll Anime Awards.

In 2020, her web radio program Kohara Konomi no Kokoro Okinaku won the Best Comfort Radio award at the 6th AniRadi Awards.

She often professes her love for the retail chain MUJI, having previously worked there as an employee.

She has two pastel calico cats, Mil and Mash.

== Filmography ==
=== Anime series ===
2016

- Bakuon!! as club member
- Handa-kun as Haru Wada, female student
- Mobile Suit Gundam: Iron-Blooded Orphans as student

2017

- Classroom of the Elite as Akane Tachibana
- Magical Circle Guru Guru as Kukuri, Miucha (ep. 20)
- Tsuki ga Kirei as Akane Mizuno

2018

- Asobi Asobase as Kasumi Nomura
- Bloom Into You as Koyomi Kanou
- Hanebado! as Erena Fujisawa
- School Babysitters as Kirin Kumatsuka
- Teasing Master Takagi-san as Mina Hibino

2019

- Azur Lane as HMS Sheffield
- Demon Slayer: Kimetsu no Yaiba as Hanako Kamado
- Domestic Girlfriend as Miu Ashihara
- Hitori Bocchi no Marumaru Seikatsu as Kai Yawara
- Kaguya-sama: Love Is War as Chika Fujiwara
- Oresuki as Luna "Tsukimi" Kusami
- Star☆Twinkle PreCure as Lala Hagoromo / Cure Milky
- Sword Art Online: Alicization as Fizel
- Teasing Master Takagi-san 2 as Mina Hibino
- The Demon Girl Next Door as Yūko Yoshida / Shamiko

2020

- A Certain Scientific Railgun T as Dolly
- Asteroid in Love as Chikage Sakurai
- Fly Me to the Moon as Chitose Kaginoji
- Kaguya-sama: Love Is War? as Chika Fujiwara
- Mewkledreamy as Nana-chan
- Our Last Crusade or the Rise of a New World as Kissing Zoa Nebulis IX
- Seton Academy: Join the Pack! as Miyubi Shishio
- Wandering Witch: The Journey of Elaina as Amnesia

2021

- Dragon Quest: The Adventure of Dai as Merle
- Mushoku Tensei: Jobless Reincarnation as Roxy Migurdia
- Tesla Note as Botan Negoro
- To Your Eternity as Oopa
- Vivy: Fluorite Eye's Song as Yuzuka Kirishima
- Waccha PriMagi! as Patano

2022

- A Couple of Cuckoos as Sachi Umino
- Akebi's Sailor Uniform as Minoru Ohkuma
- Classroom of the Elite 2nd Season as Akane Tachibana
- How a Realist Hero Rebuilt the Kingdom as Genia Maxwell
- In the Heart of Kunoichi Tsubaki as Rindō
- Kaguya-sama: Love Is War – Ultra Romantic as Chika Fujiwara
- Miss Shachiku and the Little Baby Ghost as Myako
- Princess Connect! Re:Dive Season 2 as Yuni
- Teasing Master Takagi-san 3 as Mina Hibino
- The Demon Girl Next Door Season 2 as Yūko Yoshida / Shamiko

2023

- Ao no Orchestra as Mari Tateishi
- Classroom for Heroes as Eliza Maxwell
- Frieren as Sword Village Chief
- Fly Me to the Moon 2nd Season as Chitose Kaginoji
- Hell's Paradise: Jigokuraku as Mei
- My Clueless First Friend as Akane Nishimura
- My One-Hit Kill Sister as Kuon
- Ron Kamonohashi's Forbidden Deductions as Chikori Monki
- The Rising of the Shield Hero Season 3 as Atla

2024

- Blue Archive the Animation as Arona, and the GSC President
- Classroom of the Elite 3rd Season as Akane Tachibana
- Delico's Nursery as Lafaelo Delico
- Let This Grieving Soul Retire! as Sitri Smart
- No Longer Allowed in Another World as Yuriko
- Welcome Home as Hinata Fujiyoshi
- Whisper Me a Love Song as Mari Tsutsui

2025

- Aquarion: Myth of Emotions as Sayo Ichiki, Hana Ichiki
- Flower and Asura as Chiaki Hayashi
- Headhunted to Another World: From Salaryman to Big Four! as Ulmandra
- Rascal Does Not Dream of Santa Claus as Sara Himeji
- Summer Pockets as Shiroha Naruse
- Takopi's Original Sin as Marina Kirarazaka
- Witch Watch as Kukumi Ureshino
- Yano-kun's Ordinary Days as Okamoto

2026

- Drops of God as Laurent
- Gals Can't Be Kind to Otaku!? as Sayu Amamiya
- Love Unseen Beneath the Clear Night Sky as Yūko Hayase
- Rich Girl Caretaker as Hinako Konohana

=== Anime films ===
- The Irregular at Magic High School: The Movie – The Girl Who Summons the Stars (2017) as Kokoa Watatsumi
- Pompo: The Cinéphile (2021) as Joelle Davidovich "Pompo" Pomponett
- Teasing Master Takagi-san: The Movie (2022) as Mina
- Kaguya-sama: Love Is War – The First Kiss That Never Ends (2022) as Chika Fujiwara
- Cosmic Princess Kaguya! (2026) as Mami Isayama
- Rascal Does Not Dream of a Dear Friend (2026) as Sara Himeji

=== Video games ===
2018

- Summer Pockets as Shiroha Naruse

2019

- MahjongSoul as Keikumusume, Hana Ninomiya

2020

- Genshin Impact as Mona
- Fire Emblem Heroes as Reginn

2021

- Azur Lane as SN Murmansk
- Blue Archive as Arona, Plana, and the GSC President

2022

- Trinity Trigger as Flam
- Kokoro Clover Season 1 as Treffy
- Return to Shironagasu Island as Abigail Ellison
- Little Witch Nobeta as Nobeta
- Tower of Fantasy as Tsubasa

2023

- Goddess of Victory: Nikke as Soda
- Link! Like! Love Live! as Sachi Ōgami
- Girls' Frontline as Stevens M62

2025

- Wuthering Waves as Roccia

2026

- Neverness to Everness as Chiz

=== Drama CDs ===
- Wandering Witch: The Journey of Elaina (2018) as Amnesia

=== Live-action film ===
- L DK (2014) as Reina (Aoi's classmate)
