= Hitori Bocchi no Marumaru Seikatsu =

Japanese manga series

- First tankōbon volume cover, featuring Bocchi Hitori

ひとりぼっちの○○生活
- Genre: Comedy, slice of life
- Manga
- Written by: Katsuwo
- Published by: ASCII Media Works
- Magazine: Comic Dengeki Daioh "g"
- Original run: September 27, 2013 – April 27, 2021
- Volumes: 8
- Anime television series
- Directed by: Takebumi Anzai
- Written by: Jukki Hanada
- Music by: Ryuichi Takada (Monaca); Hidekazu Tanaka (Monaca)
- Studio: C2C
- Licensed by: Crunchyroll; SA/SEA: Muse Communication
- Original network: MBS, TBS, BS-TBS, AT-X
- Original run: April 6, 2019 – June 22, 2019
- Episodes: 12
- icon

Hitori Bocchi no Marumaru Seikatsu (Japanese: ひとりぼっちの○○生活; lit. "Bocchi Hitori's ____ Life" or "The ____ Life of Being Alone") is a Japanese yonkoma manga series written and illustrated by Katsuwo. It was serialized in ASCII Media Works' Comic Dengeki Daioh "g" magazine from September 2013 to April 2021. Eight tankōbon volumes have been released. An anime television series adaptation produced by C2C aired from April to June 2019.

== Story ==
Bocchi Hitori is a girl with social anxiety who has difficulty communicating with others. Before starting middle school, her friend Kai Yawara, who will be attending a different school, tells Bocchi she is breaking off their friendship until she can make friends with her entire class at her new school. Thus, Bocchi is left with the task of befriending everyone in her class before graduation.

== Characters ==
Bocchi Hitori (一里 ぼっち, Hitori Botchi)
Voiced by: Chisaki Morishita
A girl whose social anxiety makes it hard to talk to people. When her only friend Kai breaks up with her, she is tasked with trying to befriend everyone in class, usually passing out whenever she does. Her name is derived from hitoribotchi (ひとりぼっち, "all alone").
Nako Sunao (砂尾 なこ, Sunao Nako)
Voiced by: Minami Tanaka
The first friend Bocchi makes upon entering middle school. She has a tough appearance, but is actually kind and supportive of Bocchi. Her name is derived from sunao na ko (素直な子, "honest child").
Aru Honshou (本庄 アル, Honshō Aru)
Voiced by: Akari Kitō
The vice representative in Bocchi's class. She often puts on an appearance to hide the fact that she is actually somewhat unfortunate. Her name is derived from honshō aru (本性ある, "having a true nature").
Sotoka Rakita (ソトカ・ラキター, Sotoka Rakitā)
Voiced by: Yuuko Kurose
Bocchi's classmate who comes from another country and considers herself to be a ninja. Her name is derived from soto kara kita (外から来た, "came from outside").
Kako Kurai (倉井 佳子, Kurai Kako)
Voiced by: Kana Ichinose
The public morals officer in Bocchi's school. She has a policy against making friends as she wants to become strong enough to live by herself. Her name is derived from kurai kako (暗い過去, "dark past").
Kai Yawara (八原 かい, Yawara Kai)
Voiced by: Konomi Kohara
Bocchi's friend from elementary school. Concerned over Bocchi's social anxiety after ending up in a different middle school, she breaks off her friendship with Bocchi in order to encourage her to make new friends. At the end of the series, she re-establishes her friendship with Bocchi after Bocchi is able to reach her goal. Her name is derived from yawarakai (やわらかい, "soft").
Ito Kurie (栗枝 衣抄, Kurie Ito)
Voiced by: Honoka Kuroki
Bocchi's classmate who is a student librarian. She is shy like Bocchi. Her name is derived from kurieito (クリエイト, "create").
Peko Onaka (尾中 ペコ, Onaka Peko)
Voiced by: Nana Harumura
Bocchi's classmate who loves sweets. Her name is derived from onaka pekopeko (お腹ペコペコ, "very hungry").
Hanako Yamada (山田 花子, Yamada Hanako)
Voiced by: Rika Nagae
Bocchi's classmate who is a member of the school's tennis club.
Ino Kawai (河合 依乃, Kawai Ino)
The homeroom leader of Bocchi's class. Her name is derived from kawaii no (かわいいの, "the cute one").
Mayo Ojousa (小篠咲 真世, Ojōsa Mayo)
Voiced by: Saki Miyashita
Bocchi's classmate who comes from a rich family. Her name is derived from ojō-sama yo (お嬢さまよ, "I'm a rich girl").
Nosaki Futago (二子 乃咲, Futago Nosaki)
Voiced by: Takako Tanaka
Bocchi's classmate who is the older twin. Notsugi calls her Saki. Her name is derived from futago no saki (双子の先, "the elder twin").
Notsugi Futago (二子 乃継, Futago Notsugi)
Voiced by: Hiyori Kono
Bocchi's classmate who is the younger twin. Nosaki says her voice is too loud. Nosaki calls her Tsugu (not Tsugi). Her name is derived from futago no tsugi (双子の次, "the younger twin").
Rau Minagawa (美奈川 らう, Minagawa Rau)
Voiced by: Ribu Mukai
Bocchi's classmate who is the most popular person in the class. Her classmates call her Mīna. She sings bad songs in a loud voice.
She used to go to the same elementary school as Kō Futō and Kō was her only friend then. Since Kō refused to go to school, she has behaved to make her classes fun so that Kō doesn't feel nervous. Her name is derived from mina ga warau (皆が笑う, "everybody laughs").
Kou Futou (布藤 香, Futō Kō)
Bocchi's classmate who refuses to go to school. Her name is derived from futōkō (不登校, "truancy").
Teruyo Oshie (押江 照代, Oshie Teruyo)
Voiced by: Minami Takahashi
The homeroom teacher of Bocchi's class who is called "Teru-chan" by her students. She has an irrational fear of Nako. Her name is derived from oshieteru yo (教えてるよ, "I'll teach you").
Kakeru Omoi (恩井 翔琉, Omoi Kakeru)
Her name is derived from Omoi Kakeru (おもいかける, "Transmit Feelings").
Mari Inakana (稲金 真理, Inakana Mari)
Her name is derived from inaka namari (田舎訛り, "Rural Accent").

== Media ==
=== Manga ===
Hitori Bocchi no Marumaru Seikatsu, written and illustrated by Katsuwo, was serialized in ASCII Media Works' Comic Dengeki Daioh "g" magazine from September 27, 2013, to April 27, 2021. Eight tankōbon volumes were published from November 27, 2014, to June 25, 2021.

No.	Release date	ISBN
1	November 27, 2014	978-4-04-866984-9
Chapters 1–13; Bocchi Tokubetsu-hen (ぼっち特別編)
2	January 27, 2016	978-4-04-865646-7
Chapters 14–27
3	January 27, 2017	978-4-04-892567-9
Chapters 28–39
4	February 26, 2018	978-4-04-893641-5
Chapters 40–51
5	March 27, 2019	978-4-04-912430-9
Chapters 52–63
6	February 25, 2020	978-4-04-913033-1
Chapters 64–75
7	January 27, 2021	978-4-04-913610-4
Chapters 76–87
8	June 25, 2021	978-4-04-913850-4; 978-4-04-913851-1(SE)
Chapters 88–100

=== Anime ===
An anime television series adaptation was announced after the final episode of Mitsuboshi Colors, the anime adaptation of another manga series by the same author, on March 25, 2018. The series was directed by Takebumi Anzai and written by Jukki Hanada, with animation by studio C2C. Kii Tanaka was the character designer and the chief animation director. Ryuichi Takada and Hidekazu Tanaka composed the series' music. The series aired from April 6 to June 22, 2019, on the Animeism programming block on MBS, TBS, BS-TBS, as well as AT-X. (Note: MBS listed the series premiere at 26:25 on April 5, 2019, which is April 6 at 2:25 a.m.) The opening theme song is "Hitori Bocchi no Monologue" (ひとりぼっちのモノローグ; "Lonely Monologue") by Chisaki Morishita, Minami Tanaka, Akari Kitō, and Yuuko Kurose, while the ending theme song "Ne, Issho ni Kaero" (ね、いっしょにかえろ。; "Let's Go Home Together.") by Morishita. The ending theme for episode six is "Bakushō Bocchi Juku Kōka" (爆笑ぼっち塾 校歌; "Bocchi School of Laughs Anthem") by Morishita, Tanaka, Kitō, and Kurose.

Crunchyroll streamed the series outside of Asia. Muse Communication picked up the series and it is simulcast on YouTube in Southeast Asia.

No.	Title (Note: All English titles are taken from Crunchyroll.)	Original air date
1	"My First Confession"; Transliteration: "Hajimete no Kokuhaku" (Japanese: はじめての告白)	April 6, 2019
Shy girl Bocchi Hitori ends up starting her new middle school all alone after her only friend, Kai Yawara, vows to break off their friendship until Bocchi makes friends with everyone in her class. After a failed attempt at abolishing class and a self-introduction that ends in disaster, Bocchi speaks with her neighboring classmate, Nako Sunao, who takes a liking to her despite some initial misunderstandings. As the two chat and exchange texts with each other, Nako officially becomes Bocchi's first new friend.
2	"Actually, Thank You"; Transliteration: "Hontō wa Arigatō" (Japanese: 本当はありがとう)	April 13, 2019
When Nako suddenly gets upset with Bocchi, class vice-president Aru Honshou tries to help Bocchi figure out what might have caused it. Upon learning that Nako became upset after Bocchi told her the reason she wanted to become friends with her, Aru encourages Bocchi to speak her true feelings to Nako and make up with her. The next day, as Bocchi and Nako discover Aru is rather unfortunate despite her cheerful appearance, Bocchi manages to become friends with her.
3	"Getting it Across by Spinning Your Wheels"; Transliteration: "Tsutawaru Karamawari" (Japanese: つたわる空回り)	April 20, 2019
With some help from Nako, Bocchi manages to ask Aru to walk home with them, allowing the three to become closer. Later, Nako comes over to Bocchi's house, where Bocchi's determination to be a good host leads her to get a fever. After finding out that teacher Teruyo Oshie finds her scary, Nako gets some advice from Aru on how to appear more friendly as they pay Bocchi a visit.
4	"I'll be Your Apprentice"; Transliteration: "Deshi ni Narimasu" (Japanese: 弟子になります)	April 27, 2019
Bocchi is approached by foreigner Sotoka Rakita, who becomes downhearted when Bocchi tells her that she is not a ninja. Bocchi tries to cheer Sotoka up by making origami shurikens, offering to be friends with her, but this leads Sotoka to believe that Bocchi is a ninja master in disguise and ask to become her apprentice instead. Despite this hurdle, Bocchi begins training Sotoka, asking to be friends with her once they are done.
5	"Happens All the Time"; Transliteration: "Aruaru Aruaru" (Japanese: アルアルあるある)	May 4, 2019
Aru attempts to save face in front of her friend Hanako Yamada after she accidentally brings an elementary school backpack to school with her. Things become more difficult for her the next day when she ends up wearing a full elementary school uniform. Later, Aru is challenged to a tennis match by Nako, finding it difficult due to all the times she's been skipping tennis club.
6	"Summer Comes in 5-7-5"; Transliteration: "Go-Shichi-Go de Natsu ga Kuru" (Japanese: 五七五で夏が来る)	May 11, 2019
Bocchi becomes nervous about presenting a haiku in front of her class while Nako ends up having to take supplemental lessons after failing her maths test. Meanwhile, Teruyo, trying to get over her fear of Nako, makes the assumption that Bocchi is a secret gang leader.
7	"Gentle Tears"; Transliteration: "Yawarakai Namida" (Japanese: やわらかい涙)	May 18, 2019
Feeling she needs to make one more friend before summer break starts, Bocchi attempts to befriend disciplinary committee member Kako Kurai, only to fail miserably. During summer break, the girls go to the pool, where Bocchi teaches Nako how to swim. When the girls go to karaoke afterwards, Bocchi comes across Kai, who is relieved to see that Bocchi has made some friends and remembers her promise to her. On the way home, Sotoka expresses her desire to become friends with Bocchi to the others.
8	"Welcome Back from Elsewhere"; Transliteration: "Soto kara Okaeri" (Japanese: 外からおかえり)	May 25, 2019
After many hurdles, Bocchi manages to get on talking terms with Kako, only to learn that she has a policy against making any friends. The next day, as Bocchi helps Kako clean the classroom, Kako explains that her policy is to prove herself strong enough to live on her own. Meanwhile, Sotoka worries about asking to be Bocchi's friend while remaining as her apprentice. In the end, she decides to focus on her apprentice training to show her appreciation towards Bocchi.
9	"Perfect Curry Pancakes"; Transliteration: "Zekkō no Karē Pankēki" (Japanese: 絶好のカレーパンケーキ)	June 1, 2019
During cooking class, Bocchi ends up having to work with an unfamiliar group of classmates. With some help from Aru, Bocchi manages to impress her group by making them some whipped cream for their pancakes. Afterwards, Bocchi works up the courage to introduce her friends to Kako before asking her to join her group for making curry during an outdoor class. After a successful curry, Kako acknowledges Bocchi's determination to become stronger and declares herself as her rival.
10	"No One Said That Before"; Transliteration: "Hajimete Iwareta Koto" (Japanese: はじめて言われたこと)	June 8, 2019
The second semester ends with Sotoka remaining conflicted between being Bocchi's apprentice and being her friend. During a New Year's shrine visit, Bocchi manages to become friends with the girls from her cooking class group, Peko and Ito, with Aru reporting her progress to Kai. As Sotoka becomes jealous of how close Bocchi has become with her new friends, Aru and Nako encourage Sotoka to finally become proper friends with Bocchi.
11	"From Tap-Tap to Print-Print"; Transliteration: "Taputapu kara Puripuri made" (Japanese: たぷたぷからプリプリまで)	June 15, 2019
As Bocchi becomes worried about the prospect of changing classes next year, rich girl Mayo Ojousa gets her a job making paper cranes with the pretense of earning enough to buy the school. Eventually, Mayo reveals that the school doesn't change its classes, revealing that she kept quiet about it because she felt lonely due to her parents always being absent. Bocchi and the others decide to take Mayo to an arcade to take a print club photo, where Bocchi expresses her desire to become friends with her.
12	"Maybe I Just Might"; Transliteration: "Moshikashitara Kitto" (Japanese: もしかしたらきっと)	June 22, 2019
Bocchi finally gets a smartphone before finding Kako acting uncharacteristically cheerful, which turns out to be her trying to hide the fact that she has a high fever. On the last day of the first year, Bocchi pins a corsage on a graduating third year student before walking home with all the friends she's made so far.

== Reception ==
Gadget Tsūshin listed a line from the sixth episode's ending theme in their 2019 anime buzzwords list.

== See also ==
- I'm Looking for Zombies, another manga series by the same author
- Mitsuboshi Colors, another manga series by the same author
