= Tomoyo Takayanagi =

Japanese voice actress

- 高柳 知葉
- Born: October 14, 1994 (age 31); Chiba Prefecture, Japan
- Occupation: Voice actress
- Years active: 2014–present
- Agent: Raccoon Dog
- Notable work: Umamusume: Pretty Derby as Oguri Cap; The Demon Girl Next Door as Mikan Hinatsuki; Asteroid in Love as Mira Konohata
- Height: 160 cm (5 ft 3 in)
- Website: https://www.raccoon-dog.co.jp/talent/r13-takayanagi.html

Tomoyo Takayanagi (高柳 知葉, Takayanagi Tomoyo; born October 14, 1994) is a Japanese voice actress. She is affiliated with Raccoon Dog. She made her voice acting debut in 2014 while still in training school. She is known for her roles as Oguri Cap in Umamusume: Pretty Derby, Mikan Hinatsuki in The Demon Girl Next Door, and Mira Konohata in Asteroid in Love.

== Biography ==
Takayanagi was born in Chiba Prefecture. As a child, she was interested in dancing and listening to the radio. She became interested in voice acting, after hearing Sayaka Ohara on a program on the radio station Bay FM. At the time, she thought that Ohara was merely a radio host and did not learn that she became a voice actress.

While in junior high school, Takayanagi gained an interest in anime, which was furthered upon learning that Ohara played roles in series such as Honey and Clover, Code Geass, and XxxHolic. Her interest was also strengthened by her frequent use of the website Niconico, which was gaining popularity at the time. By the end of her first year in junior high school, she had decided to pursue a career in voice acting.

Although Takayanagi wished to pursue a voice acting career early on, she instead decided to focus on her studies due to the lack of a drama club in her school. During her first year of college, she enrolled in a training school operated by the talent agency Pro-Fit. While undergoing training, she played her first roles in the anime series In Search of the Lost Future and Nobunaga Concerto. In 2015, she formally joined Pro-Fit as a talent.

In 2017, Takayanagi played the role of Rino Fujisaki in Hina Logi: From Luck & Logic. The following year, she played the roles of Oguri Cap in Umamusume: Pretty Derby and An Hatoma in Island. In 2019, she played the roles of Mikan Hinatsuki in The Demon Girl Next Door and Akari Haeno in Re:Stage!. In 2020, she was cast as Mira Konohata, the protagonist of the anime series Asteroid in Love.

== Filmography ==
=== Anime ===
Year	Title	Role	Notes	Ref.
2014	In Search of the Lost Future	Female student (episode 12)		
2014	Nobunaga Concerto	Child (episode 1)		
2015	Shōnen Hollywood	Fan (episode 16)		
2015	Teekyu	Store clerk (Episode 49), Female student (Episode 51)		
2015	Dance with Devils	Answering machine (Episode 3)		
2017	Sakurada Reset	Store clerk (episode 11)		
2017	Hina Logi: From Luck & Logic	Rino Fujisaki		
2017	Dynamic Chord	Audience		
2018	Citrus	student A (Episode 2)		
2018	Umamusume: Pretty Derby	Oguri Cap		
2018	Aikatsu Friends!	Nonoha Nonomura		
2018	Island	An Hatoma, Ann Hartman		
2019	Circlet Princess	Union senior		
2019	Wataten!: An Angel Flew Down to Me	Classmate		
2019	The Demon Girl Next Door	Mikan Hinatsuki		
2019	Re:Stage!	Akari Haeno		
2020	Asteroid in Love	Mira Konohata		
2021	Those Snow White Notes	Keiko Koyabu		
2021	Osamake	Rena Asagi		
2022	My Dress-Up Darling	Wakana Gojō (young)		
2022	The Demon Girl Next Door Season 2	Mikan Hinatsuki		
2022	Shine Post	Nanoka Hiumi		
2023	Oshi no Ko	Sarina Tendōji		
2023	I Shall Survive Using Potions!	Francette		
2024	How I Attended an All-Guy's Mixer	Chigusa		
2025	Makina-san's a Love Bot?!	Makina Agatsuma		
2025	Umamusume: Cinderella Gray	Oguri Cap		
2026	I'm Looking for Zombies	Takamo		
2026	Nia Liston: The Merciless Maiden	Neil Liston		
2027	My Sword Saint Master Is Too Cute to Live With!	Meris Eclipse		

=== Video games ===
Year	Title	Role	Notes	Ref.
2020	Magia Record	Hagumu Azumi		
2021	Blue Reflection: Second Light	Kokoro Utsubo		
2021	Umamusume: Pretty Derby	Oguri Cap		
2023	Octopath Traveler II	Pala		
2023	Fire Emblem Engage	Lapis		
2023	Ys X: Nordics	Yolds		
2024	Lilja to Natsuka no Junpaku na Uso	Lilja Meri		
2025	Tower of Fantasy	Aster		
2025	Trails in the Sky 1st Chapter	Estelle Bright		

=== Dubbing ===
- Primate as Erin Pinborough
