= I'm Looking for Zombies =

Japanese manga series

- First tankōbon volume cover, featuring Aki

#ゾンビさがしてます (#Zonbi Sagashitemasu)
- Genre: Comedy; Supernatural
- Manga
- Written by: Katsuwo
- Published by: ASCII Media Works
- English publisher: NA: Yen Press
- Imprint: Dengeki Comics Next
- Magazine: Comic Dengeki Daioh "g"
- Original run: June 27, 2022 – November 27, 2023
- Volumes: 3
- Anime television series

I'm Looking for a Zombie
- Directed by: Shinya Une
- Written by: Kenichi Yamashita; Aki Itami
- Music by: Kenta Higashiohji
- Studio: Studio Comet
- Licensed by: Crunchyroll (streaming)
- Original network: ANN (TV Asahi), BS Asahi
- Original run: October 3, 2026 – present
- Episodes: 7
- icon

I'm Looking for Zombies (Japanese: #ゾンビさがしてます, Hepburn: #Zonbi Sagashitemasu; stylized as #ImLookingForZombies) is a Japanese manga series written and illustrated by Katsuwo. It was serialized in ASCII Media Works's Comic Dengeki Daioh "g" magazine from June 2022 to November 2023, with its chapters collected into three tankōbon volumes. An anime television series adaptation produced by Studio Comet premiered in October 2026.

== Plot ==
One day, a mysterious disease called the "Red Day" appears and kills 90 percent of humanity. Thirteen years later, the survivors live in hiding in isolated villages to prevent infection. However, among the younger generation, there is a growing movement to reclaim major urban areas that have been overrun by infected zombies. Aki, along with their friends, venture out to try to find Aki's father, who left the village earlier.

== Characters ==
Aki (アキ)
Voiced by: Miyari Nemoto (Japanese); Madeline Dorroh (English)
Aki is a determined and courageous young woman belonging to the generation born after "Red Day"—the catastrophic event that turned most of humanity into zombies. She travels with her friends, exploring the ruins of human civilization while trying to uncover her family's whereabouts and the secrets behind the zombie apocalypse.
Natsuki (ナツキ)
Voiced by: Lynn (Japanese); Arianna Contardo (English)
Natsuki stands out for her helpful, attentive, and sisterly nature. She often acts as the voice of reason or the "big sister" figure, looking after her friends' well-being whenever Aki and Haru begin to act impulsively. Furthermore, she has a deep passion for fashion, aesthetics, and style. Even in a hostile, decaying post-apocalyptic setting, she makes a point of maintaining her appearance and judges the value of any object or situation based on strictly visual criteria: whether or not it is "cute" (*kawaii*). In terms of combat and self-defense, Natsuki serves as the group's ranged fighter and tactical support. Her weapon of choice is a stylized pink bow and arrow, which she wields with great precision to silently and safely eliminate zombie hordes without attracting the attention of other nearby infected.
Haru (ハル)
Voiced by: Toshiya Miyata (Japanese); Blythe Melin (English)
Yū (ユウ)
Voiced by: Hibiku Yamamura (Japanese); Giselle Fernandez (English)
Unlike the group's more energetic members, Yū has a calm, analytical, and extremely pragmatic personality. She tends to analyze situations in a strictly logical manner, which sometimes makes her appear cold. Despite her brilliant aptitude for survival engineering and defensive tactics, Yū has a significant physical weakness: her motor skills, stamina, and physical strength are described as extremely low, making her entirely dependent on the rest of the group for direct combat and tasks requiring great physical exertion.

In the English dub, Yū is referred to with gender-neutral pronouns.

Sakura (サクラ)
Voiced by: Yuka Nukui (Japanese); Anairis Quiñones (English)
After the catastrophic event known as "Red Day," Sakura was traveling through the dangerous "outside world" with her companion Yuu when they were cornered and attacked by the undead. They were rescued by a trio of young people who had left the safety of their secluded village to search for Aki's missing father. Following the rescue, Sakura and Yuu formally joined the group on their journey through the ruins of civilization. Unlike her fellow travelers, Sakura initially had no prior combat experience against the infected.
Mikazuki (ミカヅキ)
Voiced by: Yoko Hikasa
Tōka (トウカ)
Voiced by: Makoto Koichi
Takamo (タカモ)
Voiced by: Tomoyo Takayanagi
Saigo (サイゴ)
Voiced by: Aino Shimada
Aki's father (アキの父, Aki no Chichi)
Voiced by: Kohsuke Toriumi (Japanese); Christopher W. Jones (English)

== Media ==
=== Manga ===
Written and illustrated by Katsuwo, I'm Looking for Zombies was serialized in ASCII Media Works's Comic Dengeki Daioh "g" magazine from June 27, 2022, to November 27, 2023. It was compiled into three tankōbon volumes, released from December 2022 to January 2024.

During their panel at San Diego Comic-Con 2026, Yen Press announced that they will publish the series in English as an omnibus edition.

==== Volumes ====
No.	Japanese release date	Japanese ISBN
1	December 27, 2022	978-4-04-914763-6
2	June 27, 2023	978-4-04-915097-1
3	January 26, 2024	978-4-04-915508-2

=== Anime ===
An anime television series adaptation was announced on September 19, 2025. It is produced by Studio Comet and directed by Shinya Une, with assistant direction by Kyōhei Suzuki, series composition and screenplays handled by Kenichi Yamashita and Aki Itami, characters designed by Narumi Shimoji, and music composed by Kenta Higashiohji. The series premiered on October 3, 2026, on the IMAnimation programming block on TV Asahi and its affiliates. The opening theme song is "Raki Raki" (ラキラキ), performed by Surii, and the ending theme song is "Soft Apocalypse" (ソフトアポカリプス), performed by Cadode. Crunchyroll is streaming the series under the title I'm Looking for a Zombie.

==== Episodes ====
No.	Title	Directed by	Storyboarded by	Original release date
1	"I'm Looking for My Dad"; Transliteration: "Otōsan Sagashitemasu" (Japanese: お父さんさがしてます)	Shinya Une	Shinya Une	October 3, 2026
Thirteen years after the "Red Day" caused 90% of humanity to become zombies, Aki and her friends Natsuki and Haru leave their secluded village to search for Aki's missing father to either reunite with him or kill him if he's become a zombie. They head for the nearest city, where they rescue two other survivors, Sakura and Yu. Chased by a horde of zombies, the group takes shelter in an abandoned home supply store, where a distrustful Yu reluctantly educates them on society prior to the Red Day. Aki then declares they can use their access to the store's supplies and materials to fight the zombies outside. Yu instructs the group how to create a fertilizer bomb while Aki crafts bows. The next day, they use the bombs to successfully wipe out the horde. After confirming her father is not among the horde, Aki take a group photo with her friends with her father's camera, and then realizes that if they develop the film, that may provide clues as to where he went.
2	"I'm Looking for My Friends"; Transliteration: "Nakama Sagashitemasu" (Japanese: 仲間さがしてます)	Tomoki Watanabe	Shinya Une	October 10, 2026
Aki and her friends begin making themselves at home in the home supply store, with Yu directing them on how to build a water filtration system. Aki asks Yu about her camera, but Yu tells her they currently do not have the means of developing film. While collecting water from the nearby river, Yu observes that water may have some kind of repellent effect against zombies that they may be able to use to their advantage. After collecting the water, Yu cautions the group that even though they eliminated the zombies around the store, the explosion may attract humans. That night, a human survivor named Mikazuki attempts to break into the store and is captured. However, the group quickly befriends her and they part ways amicably, with Mikazuki leaving to find her friends. However, the next morning, Aki sees Mikazuki by the river and his heartbroken to see she has turned into a zombie and kills her. Yu admits she knew Mikazuki had already been bitten when she arrived at the store, and Mikazuki left to protect the others. Yu then decides they should find gasoline for their truck so they can find a photo shop to develop the Aki's camera film.
3	"I'm Looking for a Photo Shop"; Transliteration: "Shashinya-san Sagashitemasu" (Japanese: 写真屋さんさがしてます)	Masafumi Satō	Masafumi Satō	October 17, 2026
Yu develops a zombie trap to protect their base and Aki gives Sakura a flamethrower to defend herself against zombies, but she shows a separate, sadistic personality whenever she wields it. With their base protected, the group heads to a nearby gas station to collect gasoline. However, a horde of zombies attacks them in the process, but Sakura is able to turn the tide with her flamethrower. They use some of the gasoline to power a generator that turns on the home supply store's lights, and Aki and her friends marvel at witnessing electricity for the first time. The next day, the group recovers their truck and head to the photo store. As she develops the film, Yu suggests to Aki that her father may still be alive since there's no proof he died. After the film is developed, Aki finds a picture of the Tokyo Tower, recalling that it is her father's favorite landmark so the group decides to make that their next destination. However, another horde of zombies attacks and Natsuki is bitten in her right arm protecting Yu. Aki responds by cutting off Natsuki's bitten arm to prevent the infection from spreading.
4	"I'm Looking for a Hospital"; Transliteration: "Byōin Sagashitemasu" (Japanese: 病院さがしてます)	Seo Hye-jin	Tomoko Iwasaki	October 24, 2026
Feeling guilty over Natsuki getting bitten to protect her, Yu decides to find a hospital to obtain medical supplies. Sakura correctly guesses Yu is simply looking for an excuse to die so she will not be a burden on the others, so Yu requests Aki to accompany her. As they search the various hospitals in the area, Yu confides to Aki that prior to the Red Day, she was a child prodigy from a wealthy family who was repeatedly praised for her intelligence. However, after the Red Day, the value placed on physical strength meant she was suddenly shunned in her village. Yu eventually left her village after she realized her family effectively disowned her. The two are suddenly ambushed and captured by another survivor group, and Yu deduces that they are the group Mikazuki belonged to. Aki shames the survivor group for abandoning one of their own just because she was infected, and that shee still considered them all friends. Ashamed, the survivor group let Aki and Yu go and leave some supplies for them. On the way back to their base, Yu expresses her intention to leave but Aki insists that they need her intelligence in order to find her father. Natsuki greeting them as they return finally convinces Yu that she is part of the group now.
5	"I'm Looking for a Mechanic"; Transliteration: "Shūriya-san Sagashitemasu" (Japanese: 修理屋さんさがしてます)	Misuzu Hoshino	Shin Misawa	October 31, 2026
Natsuki successfully recovers from her injury and is not infected, causing everybody to celebrate. However, she finds it difficult to carry out everyday chores by herself with just one arm. Meanwhile Yu and Haru work on repairing the truck, but have limited success. While searching for parts, they happen to rescue a mechanic named Toka who agrees to repair their truck as thanks. She takes them to her workshop where they find she possesses a similar truck that belonged to her grandfather. She explains that after the Red Day, her grandfather helped her survive and taught her how to be a mechanic. However, he disappeared one day after leaving the workshop. Toka repairs the truck and Yu and Haru return to their base, where everybody throws a surprise party for Natsuki to celebrate her recovery. Natsuki decides that she wants to go to Tokyo Tower to broadcast to the world that cuteness still exists. Soon afterwards, everybody makes their preparations and set off for Tokyo Tower.
6	"I'm Visiting a Zoo"; Transliteration: "Dōbutsuen Ojamashimasu" (Japanese: 動物園おじゃまします)	Yurika Fukaya	Kyōhei Suzuki	November 14, 2026
The group head for Tokyo Tower but encounter a human settlement led by a woman named Takamo and her younger brother Saigo. While initially suspicious, they allow the group inside when they decide they are not a threat. The group are amazed at the size and sophistication of the settlement, which even encompasses the Ueno Zoo. There, they find the zoo holds special zombies that do not appear to be hostile to humans. Sakura befriends Saigo due to their similar age, and Saigo confides to her that he wishes to fill his garden with beautiful flowers to cheer up Takamo, who is always constantly under pressure to protect the settlement. As night approaches, Aki notices zombies coming from a nearby subway station, though Takamo insists the tunnels should be blocked. They investigate the station and are shocked to find the tunnels are infested with a horde of zombies. Sensing the group, the zombies attack the settlement en masse. Takamo calls for the entire settlement to evacuate as the zombies break through the first line of defense.
7	"I'm Helping the Zoo"; Transliteration: "Dōbutsuen Otasukeshimasu" (Japanese: 動物園おたすけします)	Kyōhei Suzuki	Kyōhei Suzuki	November 21, 2026
Aki and her friends cover the evacuation of the settlement residents before retreating into the zoo. Takamo decides that they need to venture out to demolish the tunnel entrance in the city to stop the flow of zombies attacking Ueno Base. Because she is taking the majority of the settlement's fighters with her, she asks Aki to protect the settlement in her place. Saigo volunteers to be part of the attack force, but Takamo forbids him to leave the settlement. As Aki and her friend stand guard, Sakura and Saigo see zombies bursting out from a storage shed, as it is also connected to the underground tunnel. The humans retreat further into the zoo, and while Aki and the others hold the zombies off, Sakura and Saigo sneak out to send word to Takamo to return. On the way, Sakura insists Saigo should be more honest about his feelings to Takamo so she will take him more seriously. They reach Takamo, who returns with the attack force in time to eliminate the zombies. The next day, the zombies are completely exterminated from Ueno Base. After being thanked by Takamo and Saigo, Aki and her friends continue on their way to Tokyo Tower.

== See also ==
- Hitori Bocchi no Marumaru Seikatsu, another manga series by the same author
- Mitsuboshi Colors, another manga series by the same author
