= The Demon Girl Next Door =

Japanese manga series and its adaptations

- First tankōbon volume cover, featuring Yuko (left) and Momo (right)

まちカドまぞく (Machikado Mazoku)
- Genre: Comedy; Slice of life; Supernatural
- Manga
- Written by: Izumo Itō
- Published by: Houbunsha
- English publisher: NA: Seven Seas Entertainment
- Magazine: Manga Time Kirara Carat
- Original run: 2014 – present
- Volumes: 6
- Anime television series
- Directed by: Hiroaki Sakurai
- Written by: Keiichirō Ōchi
- Music by: Miki Sakurai
- Studio: J.C.Staff
- Licensed by: NA: Sentai Filmworks; UK: MVM Entertainment
- Original network: TBS, BS-TBS
- English network: SEA: Animax Asia
- Original run: July 12, 2019 – July 1, 2022
- Episodes: 24
- icon

The Demon Girl Next Door (Japanese: まちカドまぞく, Hepburn: Machikado Mazoku; lit. "Street Corner Demon") is a Japanese four-panel manga series by Izumo Itō, serialized in Houbunsha's seinen manga magazine Manga Time Kirara Carat since 2014. It has been collected in six tankōbon volumes. The series follows Yuko, a demon girl, and her rivalry and friendship with Momo Chiyoda, the town's local magical girl.

An anime television series adaptation produced by J.C.Staff aired between July and September 2019. A second season aired between April and July 2022.

== Plot ==
One day, Yuko Yoshida wakes up with horns and a tail and learns that she is the descendant of the Dark Clan that was cursed into poverty by the opposing Light Clan. In order to restore her clan's honor, she is tasked with defeating the town's local magical girl, Momo Chiyoda. After Yuko fails at doing this, Momo takes pity on her and decides to train Yuko to become strong enough to defeat her. The story follows their friendship and adventures together.

== Characters ==
Yuko Yoshida (吉田 優子, Yoshida Yūko) / Shamiko (シャミ子)
Voiced by: Konomi Kohara (Japanese); Monica Rial (English)
A high school girl who one day awakens as a demon girl, tasked with defeating a magical girl. Her full demon girl title is "Shadow Mistress Yuko", often shortened into "Shamiko". Despite her ancestry, she is physically weak. In times of danger, she can transform into a Crisis Management form which slightly improves her abilities. As a succubus, she is capable to entering people's dreams while sleeping. She later inherits her father's wand, the "Whatchamacallit Rod", which can take the form of anything Yuko can envision as a stick or a weapon.
Momo Chiyoda (千代田 桃, Chiyoda Momo)
Voiced by: Akari Kitō (Japanese); Genevieve Simmons (English)
A magical girl who attends Yuko's high school. Despite allegedly being among the weakest of her fellow magical girls, she possesses great physical strength even without transforming. She is left-handed.
Lilith (リリス, Ririsu)
Voiced by: Minami Takahashi (Japanese); Emily Neves (English)
Yuko's ancestor, nicknamed Shamicen. She appears in Yuko's dreams and can receive offerings given to a statue that Yuko carries around. When a switch on the statue is flipped, she can take control of Yuko's body. She can also possess vessels that Momo creates, one of which is later enhanced with immortality by the Great White Snake so she can run errands for him.
Mikan Hinatsuki (陽夏木 ミカン, Hinatsuki Mikan)
Voiced by: Tomoyo Takayanagi (Japanese); Christina Kelly (English)
A magical girl who came to the city to assist Momo, later transferring to Yuko's school to protect her. She is afflicted by a curse that causes others to experience calamities whenever she gets flustered, which is later revealed to be caused by the guardian Ugallu in an attempt to protect her.
Anri Sata (佐田 杏里, Sata Anri)
Voiced by: Sayaka Senbongi (Japanese); Luci Christian (English)
Yuko's friend and classmate who works at a butcher.
Sion Ogura (小倉 しおん, Ogura Shion)
Voiced by: Ayaka Suwa (Japanese); Shanae'a Moore (English)
Yuko's friend and classmate who loves the occult and is a member of the school's Black Magic Studies Club.
Ryoko Yoshida (吉田 良子, Yoshida Ryōko)
Voiced by: Hitomi Ōwada (Japanese); Hilary Haag (English) (English)
Yuko's younger sister who is in middle school. Despite not being a demon girl like Yuko, she strives to help her sister in any way she can.
Seiko Yoshida (吉田 清子, Yoshida Seiko)
Voiced by: Sayaka Ohara (Japanese); Shelley Calene-Black (English)
Yuko and Ryoko's mother, who always takes everything with a smile, regardless of how bizarre it is.
Joshua (ヨシュア, Yoshua)
Voiced by: Hideyuki Umezu (Japanese); Mark Mendehlson (English)
Yuko and Ryoko's father, who also goes under the alias Taro Yoshida (吉田 太郎, Yoshida Tarō). He also has a youthful appearance. He was sealed away inside a cardboard box by Sakura.
Sakura Chiyoda (千代田 桜, Chiyoda Sakura)
Voiced by: Hisako Kanemoto (Japanese); Allison Sumrall (English)
Momo's elder adoptive-sister, who was the city's magical girl before her. She disappeared ten years ago after manipulating the seal on Yuko's family to ensure her good health.
Lico (リコ, Riko)
Voiced by: Ayasa Itō (Japanese); Melissa Molano (English)
A Huli jing fox who works under Shirosawa as a waitress at the Asura coffee shop. She has a crush on Shirosawa and has a habit of using magical leaves to bewitch people that eat her food.
Shirosawa (白澤, Shirosawa)
Voiced by: Takashi Matsuyama (Japanese); Rob Mungle (English)
A demon tapir (Hakutaku) who runs the Asura coffee shop. He also created the shopping district's mascot character, Tamasakura-chan (たまさくらちゃん) after being inspired of Sakura's cat form.
Ugallu (ウガルル, Ugaruru)
Voiced by: Fairouz Ai (Japanese); Sarah Wiedenheft (English)
Mikan's familiar, whose name comes from Ugallu. Originally intended to be a guardian to ward off evil from inside, the influence of Mikan's powerful magic led her to attack anyone that made her heart pound, leading to the so-called curse. With Yuko and Momo's help, she is separated from Mikan's body.

== Media ==
=== Manga ===
The manga series began serialization in Houbunsha's Manga Time Kirara Carat magazine in July 2014. It has been compiled into six tankōbon volumes as of December 2025. Seven Seas Entertainment have licensed the series for release in North America.

No.	Original release date	Original ISBN	English release date	English ISBN
1	November 27, 2015	978-4-8322-4639-3	January 26, 2021	978-1-64827-118-2
1st Street: Yuko Awakens!! Due to Family Circumstances, I'm a Demon Now; 2nd Street: First Battle!! The Enemy is a Pretty Classmate?!; 3rd Street: Athletic Training?! All Things Are Connected; 4th Street: Budget Increase!! Do Carbonated Drinks Count?; 5th Street: Dream or Nightmare?! The Dark Doorstop Demon; 6th Street: Shamiko's Wish!! Can 100% Beef Save the World?!; 7th Street: The Ancestor's Secret!! Descending on the Modern World!!; 8th Street: Sharpen Your Soul!! The Magical Girl's New Power; 9th Street: Temptations of the Shopping District!! Only the Camera Sees the Truth; 10th Street: Brand New Mission?! Today I'm a Courier Demon; 11th Street: Unstoppable Ancestor!! The Sudden Dream Visitation; 12th Street: First Infiltration!! Momo's Lair is a Community Center?!; 13th Street: For Tomorrow!! Put Your Back into It!
2	October 27, 2016	978-4-8322-4760-4	April 27, 2021	978-1-64827-119-9
14th Street: Shocking!! The Dark Clan's Forbidden Ritual!!; 15th Street: Momo Method!! The Tire is the Ring of Fate!!; 16th Street: Forbidden Meeting!! Magical Girl Got Your Tongue?!; 17th Street: Cursed Fruit!! Beware the Bitter Orange, Mikan!!; 18th Street: Secrets of Transformation!! A Demon's New Goal; 19th Street: Final Exams!! Today, I'll Be a Brainy Demon!!; 20th Street: Challenge!! Shamikan's Secret Cinema Excursion; 21st Street: Ancestor, Evolve!! The Dark Laboratory; 22nd Street: Home Invasion!! The Demon Shows Off to Her Little Sister; 23rd Street: Back to the Dream World!! Break Through Momo's Barriers; 24th Street: Confrontation!! Misunderstood Emotions; 25th Street: Revealed!! The Yoshida Family's Secret Past; 26th Street: Convey Your Feelings!! The Demon's Next Step!!
3	September 27, 2017	978-4-8322-4875-5	July 27, 2021	978-1-64827-269-1
27th Street: Another Showdown! The Magical Girl's New Form?!; 28th Street: Chaos in the Apartment Complex! Love Thy Neighbor!; 29th Street: A Delightful Feast! The Cosmic Flavor of Beef; 30th Street: The Secret Search! A Demon Gets Excited with Mikan; 31st Street: Like Father, Like Daughter?! A Demon's New Weapon!; 32nd Street: Internet = Darkness?! Dig Up the Peach's Feelings!; 33rd Street: The Dark Witch Returns! An Outing from Hell!; 34th Street: New Information! The Local Café is a Demon Den!; 35th Street: Take Her Back! A Pink Plan to Save Shamiko!; 36th Street: Maze of Memories?! A Snow-Cloaked Mystery and a Cat!; 37th Street: Demon Awakening! Forge Your Own Path!; 38th Street: The Secret of Ten Years Ago! Petal-Shaped Memories; 39th Street: A Promise at Dusk! The Demon Clan's Path Forward
4	October 25, 2018	978-4-8322-4988-2	October 5, 2021	978-1-64827-369-8
40th Street: A Short Break!! The Demon's Summer Festival; 41st Street: Time is Running Out!! Confront the Piles of Homework!; 42nd Street: Capture Her Stomach! The Demon's Secret Recipe!!; 43rd Street: Sparks Fly?! A Joint Outing of Light and Darkness!; 44th Street: Pitch-Black Emotions!! Darkness Peach Returns!!; 45th Street: The Mysteries of Nature! Chiyoda Sakura's Secret Spring; 46th Street: A Black Meteor?! Protect the House from You-Know-What!!; 47th Street: Ancestor's Dojo?! A Demon's Ultimate Weapon!; 48th Street: New Semester! The Magical Girl's New Role!; 49th Street: Save Our Friend!! The Demon and Vassal's Determination; 50th Street: Battle in the Dream World!! Unleash the Legendary Weapon!!; 51st Street: Revealed! The Truth Behind Mikan's Curse; 52nd Street: A Ritual in the Dark Night! A Demon's New Friend!!
5	June 27, 2019	978-4-8322-7102-9	April 12, 2022	978-1-64827-797-9
53rd Street: Communication Revolution! Today I Become a "Smartdemon"!; 54th Street: Job Hunt! The Right Role for the Right Beastgirl; 55th Street: A Demon's Birthday Party?! Peach After-School Escape!; 56th Street: Being Sealed is Such Sorrow 1: Ancestor's Day Off; 57th Street: Being Sealed is Such Sorrow 2: Longing for Deep Tama; 58th Street: Being Sealed is Such Sorrow 3: Lilith-san's Brave Night; 59th Street: Contribute Your Knowledge! The Demon Girl's New Battle Clothes; 60th Street: The Café is Closing?! Demon Moving Service!!; 61st Street: An Uninvited Guest! The Ruins Café in Crisis!!; 62nd Street: A Strange Game of Tag! Invade the Red Magical Girl's Dream!; 63rd Street: Storm of Emotions?! Lico-kun's Rain-Swept Battlefield!!; 64th Street: Intersecting Feelings!! A New Friend at Banda Manor!!
6	February 25, 2021	978-4-8322-7251-4	November 1, 2022	978-1-63858-618-0
65th Street: A Step Towards Adulthood! Demon vs. Fancy Restaurant!!; 66th Street: Even Greater Heights! Momo's New Form; 66.5th Street: The Demon Girl's Bonus Manga; 67th Street: Adrift in Space-Time?! Operation: Rescue Ogura-san!!; 68th Street: Sudden Changes?! Spot the Differences in Another World!; 69th Street: A Demon in Trouble?! The Shocking Truth!; 70th Street: The Identity of the Mysterious Girl with Glasses, Revealed!; 71st Street: Release the Romance! Pink Heartful Charge!!; 72nd Street: A Short Break?! The Demon's New World!!; 73rd Street: All-Girls' Mixer! A Demon's Teen Drama Wars!!; 74th Street: The After-Party Begins!! Gather Round, Friends!; 75th Street: A Peach-Colored Past, Revealed! Part 1; 76th Street: A Peach-Colored Past, Revealed! Part 2; 77th Street: Determination! A Demon's Vow to the Holy Ground!

=== Anime ===
An anime television series adaptation was announced in the March issue of Manga Time Kirara Carat on January 28, 2019. The series is animated by J.C.Staff and directed by Hiroaki Sakurai, with Keiichirō Ōchi handling the series composition, Mai Otsuka designing the characters, and Miki Sakurai composing the music. The series aired on TBS and BS-TBS between July 12 and September 27, 2019. The opening theme song is "Machikado Tangent" performed by Shami Momo (Konomi Kohara and Akari Kitō), while the ending theme song is "Yoimachi Cantare" performed by Coro Machikado (Kohara, Kitō, Minami Takahashi, and Tomoyo Takayanagi). The series is licensed in English-speaking regions by Sentai Filmworks, which streamed the series on HiDive.

A second season titled The Demon Girl Next Door 2-Chōme was announced in 2020, with the main staff and cast members reprising their roles. It aired from April 8 to July 1, 2022, on TBS and BS11. The opening theme song is "Tokimeki Rendezvous" performed by Shami Momo, while the ending theme song is "Yoikagen Tetragon" performed by Coro Machikado.

==== Episode list ====
===== Season 1 =====
No. overall	No. in season	Title	Directed by	Written by	Storyboarded by	Original release date
1	1	"Yuko Awakens!! For Family Reasons You're Now a Demon Girl"; Transliteration: "Yūko no Mezame!! Katei no Jijō de Kyō kara Mazoku" (Japanese: 優子の目覚め!! 家庭の事情で今日から魔族)	Nana Harada	Keiichirō Ōchi	Hiroaki Sakurai	July 12, 2019 (Note: This episode was pre-screened on July 5, 2019.)
Following a strange dream, Yuko Yoshida wakes up to find she has grown demon horns and a tail. Her mother Seiko reveals that their family are the descendants of a dark clan who live in poverty because of the opposing light clan, stating that it is Yuko's mission to defeat a magical girl to restore the clan's glory. On her way to school that day, Yuko is saved from an oncoming truck by the very magical girl she is tasked with defeating. The next day, Yuko discovers that the magical girl in question, Momo Chiyoda, is a student at her school, leading to an unsuccessful attempt at defeating her.
2	2	"Just How Sporty Are You?! Everything is Fluctuating"; Transliteration: "Supokon Desu ka!? Bambutsu wa Ruten Suru" (Japanese: スポ根ですか!? 万物は流転する)	Hideki Okamoto	Keiichirō Ōchi	Hideki Okamoto	July 19, 2019
Yuko challenges Momo to a battle during the weekend, which ends up turning into an all-day running session. As Yuko ends up having to borrow money from Momo to take the train home, she ends up having to postpone their battle until she can pay her back so as to not spend her whole allowance. However, her friends end up coercing her into spending her money on udon. Meanwhile, another demon girl prepares to set Yuko back on the right path.
3	3	"Nightmare or Forebear?! The Doorstop of Darkness Descends"; Transliteration: "Akumu ka Kichimu ka!? Yami no Doasutoppā-san Kōrin" (Japanese: 悪夢か吉夢か!? 闇のドアストッパーさん降臨)	Shigeki Awai	Keiichirō Ōchi	Wakōdo Takahashi; Hiroaki Sakurai	July 26, 2019
Yuko's demon ancestor Lilith appears in her dream to give her some advice, only for her to forget everything she said when she wakes up. Later, Yuko tries to come up with a projectile weapon to use against Momo, which leads to Momo herself teaching her how to use a magic wand.
4	4	"Sharpen Your Mind!! The Newly Awakened Powers of the Magical Girl"; Transliteration: "Kokoro Togisumase!! Mahō Shōjo no Arata Naru Chikara" (Japanese: 心研ぎ澄ませ!! 魔法少女の新たなる力)	Kōhei Hatano	Keiichirō Ōchi	Kōhei Hatano	August 2, 2019
Momo discovers a switch on the bottom of the statue that Yuko carries around. Upon being flipped, this switch gives Lilith the opportunity to possess Yuko's body. However, Lilith finds that Yuko's body is way too weak to take on Momo. Ending up in further debt to Momo as a result, Yuko takes up a part-time job selling weiners to pay her back, during which Momo transforms in order to save some weiners that Yuko dropped.
5	5	"A Town Full of Traps?? The Demon on the Brink Awakens a New Ability"; Transliteration: "Chōnai wa Wana Darake?? Gakeppuchi Mazoku no Arata Naru Nōryoku" (Japanese: 町内は罠だらけ?? 崖っぷちまぞくの新たなる能力)	Miyuki Ishida	Sayuri Ōba	Akitaro Daichi	August 9, 2019 (Note: This episode aired at 1:30 a.m. JST, 2 minutes after the original air time on TBS.)
Momo accompanies Yuko as she goes shopping with her little sister, Ryoko, using the money she was going to pay off her debt with to buy her a camera. The next day, Yuko is tasked with keeping Momo's laptop safe until she can deliver it to Ryoko. Faced with getting past a dog, Yuko obtains a new Crisis Management transformation that ultimately proves to be pointless.
6	6	"Courage to Face the Future!! The Heavy Roller Won't Stop"; Transliteration: "Asu e no Ketsui!! Omoi Kondara Tomaranai" (Japanese: あすへの決意!! 重いコンダラ止まらない)	Fumihiro Ueno	Keiichirō Ōchi	Taiichi Oikawa	August 16, 2019 (Note: This episode aired at 1:50 a.m. JST, 22 minutes after the original air time on TBS.)
Lilith sends Yuko into Momo's subconscious, where she ends up tidying the dark muck surrounding her dreams. The next day, Momo comes down with a fever, so Yuko takes her back to her house to take care of her. When Yuko wipes some blood off Momo's wrist and brings it home, she unknowingly breaks a seal on her house, giving Lilith the ability to speak through her statue. Losing some of her magical power as a result, Momo requests that Yuko help her protect the city.
7	7	"The Pink Method!! The Wheel of Fate is a Round Tire!!"; Transliteration: "Momoiro Mesoddo!! Marui Taiya wa Unmei no Wa!!" (Japanese: 桃色メソッド!! 丸いタイヤは運命の輪!!)	Yoshiyuki Nogami	Keiichirō Ōchi	Iku Suzuki	August 23, 2019
Discovering that Yuko's actions have lifted the curse limiting their family to a tight monthly budget, the Yoshida family celebrate by holding an okonomiyaki party, only to find their fridge has broken down following a brief power cut. After recovering from her cold, Momo starts training Yuko to become stronger. Later, as Yuko takes on another part-time job as a character mascot, she ends up meeting another magical girl.
8	8	"The Cursed Fruit!! Beware the Sour Mikan!!"; Transliteration: "Norowareta Kajitsu!! Suppai Mikan ni Goyōjin!!" (Japanese: 呪われた果実!! すっぱいミカンにご用心!!)	Hideki Okamoto	Sayuri Ōba	Hideki Okamoto	August 30, 2019
The magical girl, Mikan Hinatsuki, is called by Momo to assist her with Yuko's training. As Mikan makes plans to transfer to Yuko's school, it is revealed that she possesses a curse that causes misfortune on people around her whenever she gets flustered. Later, as Yuko begins training to use her Crisis Management form at will, she learns from Mikan that magical girls disappear if they use up all of their magic.
9	9	"Final Exams!! Today I'm One of Those Brainy Demons!!"; Transliteration: "Kimatsu Tesuto!! Kyō no Watashi wa Zunōha Mazoku!!" (Japanese: 期末テスト!! 今日の私は頭脳派まぞく!!)	Naoki Murata	Keiichirō Ōchi	Akitaro Daichi	September 6, 2019
Wanting Momo to take her more seriously, Yuko proposes a friendly duel to determine who can score best on history during the final exams. Lilith offers to help Yuko cheat by giving her answer telepathically during the test, but Yuko ends up deciding against it, resulting in a fair and square loss. On another day, Mikan invites Yuko to see a horror movie with her to help her control her curse.
10	10	"The Ancestor Evolves!! A Pair of Glasses Reflect Within a Dark Lab"; Transliteration: "Gosenzo wa Shinka Suru!! Megane ga Utsusu Ankoku Bushitsu" (Japanese: ご先祖は進化する!! メガネが映す暗黒部室)	Miyuki Ishida	Sayuri Ōba	Tatsuo Satō	September 13, 2019 (Note: This episode aired at 1:43 a.m. JST, 15 minutes after the original air time on TBS.)
Yuko's occult-obsessed classmate, Sion Ogura, brings her and Momo to the Black Magic Studies Lab to try some experiments on Lilith's statue. With Momo's help, they create a small doll to serve as a temporary vessel for Lilith, albeit one that Momo can remotely control. Later, Ryo comes with Yuko to Momo's place, believing that Momo and Mikan have become Yuko's subordinates.
11	11	"Diving into Dreams Once Again!! Break Through the Pink Defense Line"; Transliteration: "Yume Dorīmu Futatabi!! Momoiro Bōeisen o Toppa Seyo" (Japanese: 夢ドリーム再び!! 桃色防衛線を突破せよ)	Nanako Shimazaki	Keiichirō Ōchi	Nanako Shimazaki	September 20, 2019
Wanting to get Momo to open up to her, Yuko once again dives into her dream, but this time has to break through her outer defenses. Getting inside and meeting with Momo, who is fully aware, Yuko learns there is apparently a secret pertaining to her father in her house. After they both wake up, Seiko explains to them how Momo's sister Sakura interfered with the curse on their family to ensure Yuko would grow up healthy. She then reveals that Sakura sealed Yuko's father Joshua inside a cardboard box before disappearing ten years ago, leaving Momo conflicted.
12	12	"Feelings to Convey!! A New Leap Forward for Demonkind!!"; Transliteration: "Tsutaetai Omoi!! Mazoku Arata Naru Ippo!!" (Japanese: 伝えたい想い!! まぞく新たなる一歩!!)	Yoshiyuki Nogami; Miyuki Ishida	Keiichirō Ōchi	Hiroaki Sakurai	September 27, 2019 (Note: This episode aired at 1:33 a.m. JST, 5 minutes after the original air time on TBS.)
Chasing after Momo after she runs off, Yuko proposes that she quit being a magical girl and become her vassal so she can search for Sakura. Deducing that she would become weaker as a result, Momo rejects the deal in favor of having Yuko help her search for Sakura, stating that she will only become Yuko's vassal if she can defeat her.

===== Season 2 =====
No. overall	No. in season	Title	Directed by	Written by	Storyboarded by	Original release date
13	1	"Yet Another Showdown! The Magical Girl has a Brand New Appearance?!"; Transliteration: "Taiketsu Futatabi! Mahō Shōjo no Arata Naru Sugata!?" (Japanese: 対決ふたたび！魔法少女の新たなる姿！？)	Makoto Sokuza	Keiichirō Ōchi	Hiroaki Sakurai	April 8, 2022 (Note: This episode was pre-screened on March 12, 2022.)
Yuko writes Momo a letter challenging her to duel at the start of summer vacation, which Momo interprets as her wanting to hang out, leading to a confusing day out until the misunderstanding is cleared. Later, Mikan moves into Yuko's apartment complex, prompting Momo to do the same, after which everyone has a sukiyaki party.
14	2	"Urban Exploration! The Troubled Mikan and the Excited Demon"; Transliteration: "Haikyo Sōsaku! Wakeari Mikan to Wakuwaku Mazoku" (Japanese: 廃墟捜索！わけありみかんとわくわくまぞく)	Akira Tanaka; Yoshiyuki Nogami	Keiichirō Ōchi	Hideki Okamoto	April 15, 2022
Upon learning that the box Joshua was sealed in came from one of Mikan's old factories, Yuko, Momo and Mikan investigate the old warehouse, which had previously been destroyed by Sakura. After hearing from Mikan about how she and Momo first met, Yuko hears a mysterious voice and discovers a magic wand, which mysteriously turns into a fork upon touching it. Seiko reveals that this "whatchamacallit rod", which once belonged to Joshua, has the power to transform into any tool or weapon its user can think of.
15	3	"The Dark Witch Returns! With Steam From Hell!"; Transliteration: "Yami no Majo Futatabi! Yukemuri Furomu Heru!" (Japanese: 闇の魔女ふたたび！湯けむりフロムヘル！)	Naoki Horiuchi	Sayuri Ōba	Kōhei Hatano	April 22, 2022
After Momo sets up internet in her household, Yuko signs up to a social media site and tries to find out what Momo's username is. Later, Momo allows Lilith to take over Yuko's body for a day at the health spa, discovering that she's afraid the dark.
16	4	"A New Species Discovered! The Town Café is a Demon Lair!"; Transliteration: "Shinshu Hakken! Machi no Kissa wa Mazoku no Sōkutsu!" (Japanese: 新種発見！町の喫茶はまぞくの巣窟！)	Shigeru Fukase	Sayuri Ōba and Keiichirō Ōchi	Shinji Itadaki	April 29, 2022
Following a tip from Anri on where to find other demons who may know about Sakura, Yuko comes across Café Asura run by Shirosawa the tapir demon and Lico the Huli jing fox, who coerce her into working part-time for them. Noticing Yuko acting strangely and repeatedly forgetting about her mission, Momo, Mikan and Lilith take down the magical barrier surrounding the café so they can confront the owners and rescue Yuko. There, they discover that Yuko's drowsiness and lapse in memory was the result of her eating excessive amounts of Lico's enchanted food, an aftereffect Shirosawa himself was unaware of.
17	5	"Raid! The Pink Plan to Retake Shamiko!"; Transliteration: "Kachikome! Momoiro no Shamiko Dakkan Sakusen!" (Japanese: かちこめ！桃色のシャミ子奪還作戦！)	Makoto Sokuza	Keiichirō Ōchi	Iku Suzuki	May 6, 2022 (Note: The episode's revised title was "Demon's Awakening! Carve your Own Path!" (まぞく覚醒！自らの道を切り開け！, Masoku Kakusei! Mizukara no Michi o Kirihirake!).)
Shirosawa visits Yuko and the others and tells them that the last time he saw Sakura was ten years ago, when she left Lico in her care. He also reveals that a mascot character he designed was based on a cat spirit he saw ten years ago. This is deduced by Ryou to be Sakura's core, which is backed up by Seiko revealing that Yuko once told her about seeing a cat when she was hospitalised at that time. Using her power to dive into her own memories of ten years ago, Yuko is chased by bad memories and loses contact with Lilith before being saved by none other than Sakura herself.
18	6	"Vow Under the Setting Sun! The Path Forward for Demonkind"; Transliteration: "Yūhi no Chikai! Mazoku-tachi no Susumu Michi" (Japanese: 夕日の誓い！まぞくたちの進む道)	Yoshiyuki Nogami	Keiichirō Ōchi	Hideki Okamoto	May 13, 2022
Sakura reveals that she gave her core to Yuko in order to sustain her life, encouraging Yuko to become stronger so that she will no longer need to rely on it. After Sakura disappears from expending her stored up energy, Yuko is rescued by Momo, who had temporarily turned over to the dark side so she could enter Yuko's memories and bring her back to the real world. Reassured that her sister is inside Yuko, Momo decides on a new goal to make Yuko happy, choosing to help Yuko fulfil her promise to Sakura to help protect the town.
19	7	"A Short Break!! The Demonic Summer Festival"; Transliteration: "Hitotoki no Kyūka!! Mazoku no Natsumatsuri" (Japanese: ひと時の休暇！！まぞくの夏祭り)	Kazuho Kunimoto	Sayuri Ōba	Kōichi Takada	May 27, 2022 (Note: This episode was originally scheduled to air on May 20, 2022, but it was delayed to May 27, 2022.)
Encouraged by Anri to spend at least one day of her summer break taking it easy, Yuko attends the shopping district's summer festival but struggles to enjoy herself until Momo and Mikan end up joining her. Later, Yuko tries to motivate Momo to finish her summer homework in time, putting herself in a crunch with her own homework in the process.
20	8	"Sparks Fly?! Light and Dark Go on a Joint Excursion!"; Transliteration: "Hibana Chiru!? Hikari to Yami no Gōdō Ensoku!" (Japanese: 火花散る！？光と闇の合同遠足！)	Ryō Andō	Keiichirō Ōchi	Ryō Andō	June 3, 2022
Yuko asks Lico to teach her how to make a colorful lunch box for a trip to the zoo with Momo and Mikan, learning from Shirosawa about how magical girls allegedly receive rewards from the Light Clan for defeating demons. On the day of the zoo trip, Momo becomes bemused to find Lico and Shirosawa joining them, especially when Lico pretends to be Yuko to try and trick her into taking medicine to stabilise her magic core.
21	9	"Pitch-Black Feelings!! Darkness Peach Returns!!"; Transliteration: "Kuroki Kanjō!! Dākunesu Pīchi Futatabi!!" (Japanese: 黒き感情！！ダークネスピーチ再び！！)	Kōhei Hatano	Sayuri Ōba	Tatsuo Satō	June 10, 2022
Momo ends up falling to the dark side again, leaving her unable to control her magic output and start to run out of magic fast. Ogino explains that Momo has become more susceptible to falling to the dark side following her rescue of Yuko. With her disappointment over the zoo trip being what caused her to fall to the dark side, Momo manages to return to the light side thanks to Yuko's handmade lunch box. Later, Yuko and Momo travel to a hot spring belonging to Sakura to help restore Momo's magic, having to deal with various traps along the way.
22	10	"The Ancestor's Dojo?! Demonkind's Ultimate Weapon!"; Transliteration: "Gosenzo Dōjō!? Mazoku Kyūkyoku no Buki!" (Japanese: ごせんぞ道場！？まぞく究極の武器！)	Kōzō Kaihō	Sayuri Ōba	Iku Suzuki	June 17, 2022 (Note: This episode aired at 2:00 a.m. JST, 32 minutes after the original air time on TBS.)
Yuko helps Mikan deal with a cockroach in her room before Momo decides to make her a magical barrier to ward off bugs. Later, Ryoko joins Yuko in Lilith's dreamscape to help her test the limits of her Whatchamacallit-Rod.
23	11	"New Semester! The Magical Girl's New Duty!"; Transliteration: "Shin Gakki! Mahō Shōjo no Arata Naru Yakuwari!" (Japanese: 新学期！魔法少女の新たなる役割！)	Makoto Sokuza	Keiichirō Ōchi	Hideki Okamoto	June 24, 2022
On her first day at Yuko and Momo's school, Mikan joins Anri on the Sports Day Committee, which Momo and Shamiko also end up assisting with. As the committee works on preparations, an accident briefly knocks Mikan unconscious, causing her curse to spill out and ruin some of their work. Despite everyone's kindness and understanding, Mikan feels the need to distance herself so her curse doesn't hurt others. Wanting to help her, Yuko and Momo decide to go inside Mikan's dreams to speak with Ugallu, the devil at the heart of her curse.
24	12	"A Ritual in Darkness! The Demon's New Ally!!"; Transliteration: "Yamiyo no Gishiki! Mazoku Arata Naru Nakama!!" (Japanese: 闇夜の儀式！まぞく新たなる仲間！！)	Yoshiyuki Nogami	Keiichirō Ōchi	Hiroaki Sakurai	July 1, 2022
Upon reaching Ugallu, which appears as a black mist surrounding Mikan, Yuko uses her Whatchamacallit Rod as a whisk to mix the mist into a solid form that Momo can communicate with. Momo convinces Ugallu that her way of protecting Mikan has only caused her misfortune, only to learn that she will disappear upon leaving Mikan's body as she has lost her purpose. However, Mikan manages to awaken inside her dreams, thanks to Anri's support from the outside, and stop Ugallu from disappearing, instead proposing that they summon her into the real world and find her a new job. With the help of all of Yuko's friends, they successfully summon Ugallu into a new vessel in the real world as a member of Mikan's family.

=== Video games ===
In 2019, characters from the series appear alongside other Manga Time Kirara characters in the mobile RPG, Kirara Fantasia. In 2020, characters and songs from the series appeared in collaboration with Pony Canyon's mobile music game Re:Stage! Prism Step and Sega's arcade music game Ongeki.

=== Stage play ===
A stage play running from January 9 to January 15, 2025, was announced in October 2024. The play is directed and written by Naru Kawamoto, with Toomi playing Yuko and Karin Osanai playing Momo.

== Reception ==
=== Cultural influence ===
Gadget Tsūshin listed "Crisis Management!" and "Shamiko is a bad girl" in their 2019 anime buzzwords list, although the latter was a fan meme and was never said in the show.

=== Critical reception ===
Reviewing the first season of the anime, Theron Martin called it the "funniest comedy of its season" and praised it for "mixing tried-and-true gags with fresh twists". He enjoyed other aspects of the story, particularly Yuko and Momo's relationship, and commended the overarching narrative, which he described as having a "poignant" resolution. Though he was less enthused about the animation, he ultimately gave the show a "B+" rating for its "delightful humor" and "deeper story than initially apparent".
