= Minami Takahashi (voice actress) =

Japanese voice actress from Kanagawa Prefecture (born 1990)

- 髙橋 ミナミ
- Born: December 20, 1990 (age 35); Kanagawa Prefecture, Japan
- Occupation: Voice actress
- Years active: 2011–present
- Agent: Haikyō
- Height: 161 cm (5 ft 3 in)

Minami Takahashi (髙橋 ミナミ, Takahashi Minami; born December 20, 1990) is a Japanese voice actress from Kanagawa Prefecture. She is affiliated with Haikyō. Her major roles include Sora Kazesawa in Aikatsu!, Midoriko in Selector Infected Wixoss, Ojou in Please Tell Me! Galko-chan, Lucoa in Miss Kobayashi's Dragon Maid, Saturn in Hi-sCoool! SeHa Girls, Beatrix in Zom 100: Bucket List of the Dead and Nana Aokaze/Cure Wink in You and Idol Pretty Cure.

== Personal life ==
On October 14, 2022, Takahashi went on a brief hiatus due to a throat condition until she made a full recovery in mid-2023.

== Filmography ==
=== Anime ===
Year	Title	Role	Other notes
2012	The Pet Girl of Sakurasou	Usagi	
2012	Say "I love you".	Female student	Episode 10
2012	Tari Tari	Female customer	Episode 5
2012	My Little Monster	Female student (ep 8); Yuka (ep 9)	
2013	Aikatsu!	Sora Kazesawa	
2013	Karneval	Nurse B	Episode 6
2013	Sunday Without God	Run Sagittarius	
2013	Day Break Illusion	Lymro	
2013	Kotoura-san	Female student B	Episode 9
2013	Samurai Flamenco	Clerk	Episode 2
2013	Senki Zesshō Symphogear G	Tōko Sabe	Episode 3
2013	Da Capo III	Miyamoto	Episode 4
2013	Tanken Driland - 1000-nen no Mahō -	Princess Haniwa	Episode 35
2013	The Severing Crime Edge	Female student	Episode 2
2013	The "Hentai" Prince and the Stony Cat.	Morii	
2013	Boku wa Ōsama	Chicken	
2013	Unbreakable Machine-Doll	Girl B (younger sister)	Episode 1
2013	Log Horizon	Asuka	
2014	Atelier Escha & Logy: Alchemists of the Dusk Sky	Girl	Episode 4
2014	Is the Order a Rabbit?	Female Customer B	Episode 11
2014	Samurai Flamenco	Boy	Episode 12
2014	Your Lie in April	Contestant	Episode 4
2014	JoJo's Bizarre Adventure: Stardust Crusaders	Boy (ep 19), Child (eps 11, 16), Female Student B (ep 2)	
2014	Selector Infected WIXOSS	Midoriko	
2014	Selector Spread WIXOSS	Midoriko	
2014	Bladedance of Elementalers	Student	Episode 4
2014	World Conquest Zvezda Plot	citizen A	Episode 3
2014	A Good Librarian Like a Good Shepherd		
2014	D-Frag!	Noborito	
2014	Noragami	Akira Yamashita, Ten'in (ep 3), Ayakashi B (ep 5)	
2014	PriPara	mew	
2014	Hi-sCoool! SeHa Girls	Sega Saturn	
2014	Fate/stay night: Unlimited Blade Works	Girl student (eps 5, 9), Announcer (ep 11)	
2014	The Kawai Complex Guide to Manors and Hostel Behavior	Girl	Episode 7
2014	Magimoji Rurumo	Masako Shimomura	
2014	Log Horizon 2	Byakkō	Episodes 7, 8
2014	Aikatsu!	Rin Oikawa	Episode 3
2015	Food Wars: Shokugeki no Soma	Megumi Tadokoro	
2015	Is It Wrong to Try to Pick Up Girls in a Dungeon?	Tione Hiryute	
2015	Tantei Kageki Milky Holmes TD	Shout	
2015	High School DxD BorN	Kuroka	
2015	Mikagura School Suite	Rumina Rikyū	
2015	Valkyrie Drive: Mermaid	Nimi Minimi	
2016	Please Tell Me! Galko-chan	Ojou	
2016	Food Wars: Shokugeki no Soma - The Second Plate	Megumi Tadokoro	
2016	Re:Zero − Starting Life in Another World	Theresia van Astrea	Episodes 20, 21
2016	Monster Hunter Stories: Ride On	Lilia	
2016	Flip Flappers	Cocona	
2017	ēlDLIVE	Maclane	
2017	Miss Kobayashi's Dragon Maid	Lucoa	
2017	Alice & Zouroku	Ayumu Miho	
2017	Is It Wrong to Try to Pick Up Girls in a Dungeon?: Sword Oratoria	Tione Hiryute	
2017	Eromanga Sensei	Elf Yamada	
2017	Food Wars: Shokugeki no Soma - The Third Plate	Megumi Tadokoro	
2018	Umamusume: Pretty Derby	El Condor Pasa	
2018	Black Clover	Grey	
2018	Yu-Gi-Oh! VRAINS	Roboppi, Young Ryoken	
2018	Kira Kira Happy Hirake! Cocotama	Haruka Hoshikawa	
2018	Harukana Receive	Kanna Aragaki	
2018	Food Wars: Shokugeki no Soma - The Third Plate: Tootsuki Ressha-hen	Megumi Tadokoro	
2018	Back Street Girls	Rina	
2019	W'z	Tamari	
2019	Beyblade Burst GT	Ichika Kindo	
2019	Hitori Bocchi no Marumaru Seikatsu	Teruyo Oshie	
2019	Re:Stage! Dream Days♪	Aone Shikimiya	
2019	Arifureta: From Commonplace to World's Strongest	Shea Haulia	
2019	The Demon Girl Next Door	Lilith	
2019	Food Wars: Shokugeki no Soma - The Fourth Plate	Megumi Tadokoro	
2019	Chidori RSC	Karen Sakashita	
2020	Uchitama?! Have you seen my Tama?	Kun Kuramochi	
2020	Food Wars! Shokugeki no Soma The Fifth Plate	Megumi Tadokoro	
2020	Wandering Witch: The Journey of Elaina	Mina	
2020	Yu-Gi-Oh! Sevens	Asana Mutsuba	
2021	Tropical-Rouge! Pretty Cure	Yuna Yamabe	
2021	Azur Lane: Slow Ahead!	USS Baltimore	
2021	Combatants Will Be Dispatched!	Grimm	
2021	Life Lessons with Uramichi Oniisan	Kayo Ennoshita	
2021	Kageki Shoujo!!	Asuka Yano	
2021	Miss Kobayashi's Dragon Maid S	Lucoa	
2021	Restaurant to Another World 2	Pikke	
2022	Arifureta: From Commonplace to World's Strongest 2nd Season	Shea Haulia	
2022	Birdie Wing: Golf Girls' Story	Helene Robert	
2022	Deaimon	Kanoko Matsukaze	
2022	RPG Real Estate	Seira	
2022	Komi Can't Communicate Season 2	Ayami Sasaki	
2022	The Demon Girl Next Door Season 2	Lilith	
2022	Legend of Mana: The Teardrop Crystal	Rachel	
2022	More Than a Married Couple, But Not Lovers	Sachi Takamiya	
2022	Yu-Gi-Oh! Go Rush!!	Asaka Mutsuba	
2023	Zom 100: Bucket List of the Dead	Beatrix Amerhauser	
2024	Atri: My Dear Moments	Minamo Kamishiro	
2024	Arifureta: From Commonplace to World's Strongest 3rd Season	Shea Haulia	
2025	You and Idol Pretty Cure	Nana Aokaze/Cure Wink	
2025	Yandere Dark Elf: She Chased Me All the Way From Another World!	Mariabelle	
2025	New Saga	Sildonia	
2025	Shangri-La Frontier Season 2	Sylvia Goldberg	
2026	Tetsuryō! Meet with Tetsudō Musume	Misaki Kōjiro	
2027	My Sword Saint Master Is Too Cute to Live With!	Lumiere Theomere	

=== OVA ===
Year	Title	Role
2015	The Kawai Complex Guide to Manors and Hostel Behavior	Girl
2018	Kase-san and Morning Glories	Yui Yamada

=== Anime film ===
Year	Title	Role
2013	Aura: Koga Maryuin's Last War	Kanō
2014	Aikatsu! The Movie	Sora Kazesawa
2020	High School Fleet: The Movie	Tōmi "Miya" Miyazato
2025	Miss Kobayashi's Dragon Maid: A Lonely Dragon Wants to Be Loved	Lucoa

=== Video games ===
Year	Title	Role
2012	star plus one	Kanon Uzuki
2013	Aikatsu! Futari no My Princess	Sora Kazesawa
2013	The Idolmaster Million Live!	Konomi Baba
2013	Genjū Hime	Atlas
2013	Pygmalion of overlapping shadows	Reika
2013	The "Hentai" Prince and the Stony Cat.	Morii
2014	Sword Art Online: Hollow Fragment	
2014	Dolly♪Kanon: Dokidoki ♪ Tokimeki ♪ Himitsu no Ongaku Katsudō Sutāto deesu!!	Sōshi Okuda
2014	Dream Club gogo	Mitsuki
2014	Trigger Kiss	Masako Himeno
2014	Magica Wars Zanbatsu	Princess Echigo
2014	Yome Collection	
2015	Labyrinth of Andersen	Eshel (The Little Mermaid)
2015	Nekomimi Survivor!	Akane, Haoto
2015	Brave Sword × Blaze Soul	Tathlum
2015	Fire Emblem Fates	Pieri
2016	Granblue Fantasy	Diola, Kokabiel
2017	Azur Lane	USS Baltimore
2020	Arknights	Whislash
2020	Atri: My Dear Moments	Minamo Kamishiro
2021	Lost Judgment	Kyoko Amasawa
2021	Umamusume: Pretty Derby	El Condor Pasa
2022	Alchemy Stars	Lucoa
2022	Digimon Survive	Saki Kimijima
2023	Crymachina	Ami Shido
2025	Wuthering Waves	Lupa
