= Re:Stage! =

Japanese media franchise

- Re:Stage! Dream Days♪ key visual

Re:ステージ! (Risutēji)
- Genre: Music
- Light novel

Re:Stage!
- Written by: Team Yoree
- Illustrated by: Tsubasu Izumi; Marehosi Gakuen Takao School Art Club; Matsuda98
- Published by: Kadokawa Shoten
- Original run: August 2015 – July 2018
- Volumes: 3
- Video game

Re:Stage! Prism Step
- Developer: Hotarubi
- Publisher: Pony Canyon
- Genre: Rhythm Action
- Platform: iOS (10.0 or above); Android (4.4 or above)
- Released: JP: July 31, 2017
- Anime television series

Re:Stage! Dream Days♪
- Directed by: Shin Katagai
- Produced by: Yasuo Tsubakimoto; Natsuko Kawasaki; Hidemasa Arai; Yukihiro Amano; Genki Satō; Norio Fukui
- Written by: Team Yoree
- Music by: Kohta Yamamoto
- Studio: Yumeta Company; Graphinica
- Licensed by: NA: Sentai Filmworks
- Original network: Tokyo MX, BS Fuji, AT-X
- Original run: July 7, 2019 – September 29, 2019
- Episodes: 12
- icon

Re:Stage! (Re:ステージ!, Risutēji) is a Japanese multimedia franchise by Pony Canyon and Comptiq. It features character designs and illustrations by artist Tsubasu Izumi, series composition and story by Team Yoree (Yoriko Tomita, Yasuko Kamo and Tatsuhiko Urahata), and music by Kohta Yamamoto. The story revolves around female junior high school idols who aim to become a top in Prism Stage, a nationwide tournament where many middle school idols compete and become top idols. These girls are divided into several units. Their stories are serialized in monthly Comptiq and short stories are released online via the official website.

A light novel series and several unit singles has been released. A mobile rhythm game developed by Hotarubi titled Re:Stage! Prism Step (Re:ステージ！プリズムステップ, Risutēji Purizumu Suteppu) was released on July 31, 2017, for Android and August 5, 2017, for iOS. An anime television series titled Re:Stage! Dream Days♪ (Re:ステージ！ ドリームデイズ♪, Risutēji Dorīmu Deizu♪) by Yumeta Company and Graphinica aired from July 7 to September 29, 2019.

== Cast ==
=== KiRaRe ===
KiRaRe (キラリ, Kirari)

- Amane Makino as Mana Shikimiya (式宮 舞菜, Shikimiya Mana)
- Akari Kitō as Sayu Tsukisaka (月坂 紗由, Tsukisaka Sayu)
- Masumi Tazawa as Mizuha Ichikishima (市杵島 瑞葉, Ichikishima Mizuha)
- Meemu Tachibana as Kae Hiiragi (柊 かえ, Hiiragi Kae)
- Yuka Iwahashi as Kasumi Honjō (本城 香澄, Honjō Kasumi)
- Yuki Sorami as Minori Hasegawa (長谷川 実, Hasegawa Minori)/Mii Hasegawa (長谷川 みい, Hasegawa Mii)

=== Ortensia ===
ortensia (オルタンシア, Orutanshia)

- Ari Ozawa as Yukari Itsumura (伊津村 紫, Itsumura Yukari)
- Yumiri Hanamori/Tomomi Mineuchi as Haruka Itsumura (伊津村 陽花, Itsumura Haruka)

=== Stellamaris ===
Stellamaris (ステラマリス, Suteramarisu)

- Minami Takahashi as Aone Shikimiya (式宮 碧音, Shikimiya Aone)
- Ayaka Suwa as Ruka Ichijō (一条 瑠夏, Ichijō Ruka)
- Aimi Tanaka as Sango Misaki (岬 珊瑚, Misaki Sango)

=== Trois Anges ===
TROIS ANGES (トロワアンジュ, Torowaanju)

- Natsumi Hioka as Amaha Shiratori (白鳥 天葉, Shiratori Amaha)
- Rika Abe as Kanade Hokaze (帆風 奏, Hokaze Kanade)
- Juri Nagatsuma as Nagisa Himura (緋村 那岐咲, Himura Nagisa)

=== Tetrarkhia ===
Tetrarkhia (テトラルキア, Tetorarukia)

- Natsumi Yamada as Mikuru Bandō (坂東 美久龍, Bandō Mikuru)
- Miki Satō as Haku Nishidate (西館 ハク, Nishidate Haku)
- Tomoyo Takayanagi as Akari Haeno (南風野 朱莉, Haeno Akari)
- Nozomi Nishida as Kuroha Shirokita (城北 玄刃, Shirokita Kuroha)

== Discography ==
=== Singles ===
Release date	Artist	Title
2016
March 16	KiRaRe	"Startin' My Re:STAGE!!"
August 17	KiRaRe	"Remembers!" (リメンバーズ！)
2017
January 18	KiRaRe	"Akogare Future Sign" (憧れFuture Sign)
January 18	Ortensia	"FlowerS ~Tonari de Saku Hana no Yō ni~" (FlowerS～となりで咲く花のように～)
March 15	Stellamaris	"Stage of Star"
July 19	Ortensia	"Purple Rays"
August 18	Stellamaris	"Secret Dream"
September 10	Trois Anges	"Cresc. Heart"
September 10	Tetrarkhia	"Fearless Girl"
December 20	KiRaRe	"Sensei Sensation" (宣誓センセーション)
2018
June 20	Ortensia	"＊Heart Confusion＊"
June 20	Stellamaris	"Brilliant Wings"
August 22	KiRaRe	"367Days"
November 21	Tetrarkhia	"Heroic Spark"
December 19	Trois Anges	"Lumiere"
2019
March 27	KiRaRe	"Happy Typhoon" (ハッピータイフーン)
July 24	KiRaRe	"Don't Think, Smile!!" (Don't think,スマイル!!)
August 21	Shikimiya Mana; Tsukisaka Sayu	"Blooming, Blooming!/Rocket" (Blooming, Blooming!/ロケット)
August 21	Hiiragi Kae; Honjō Kasumi	"Gadget wa Princess/Sēno de Tobe tte Itten no!" (ガジェットはプリンセス/せーので跳べって言ってんの！)
August 21	Ichikishima Mizuha; Hasegawa Mii	"Hito Yo Hito Yo ni Hitorigoto/For You! For Me!" (ひと夜ひと夜にひとりごと/For you! For みい!)
2022
May 11	Honjō Kasumi; Ichijō Ruka; Bandō Mikuru	"Sin City"
May 18	Shikimiya Mana; Tsukisaka Sayu; Misaki Sango	"Chiguhagu Melody" (ちぐはぐメロディ)
May 25	Tetrarkhia	"Unison Monologue" (ユニゾンモノローグ)
June 1	TROIS ANGES	"Ginga no Shizuku" (銀河の雫)
June 15	Stellamaris	"Clematis" (Clematis-クレマチス-)
August 5	KiRaRe	"Ideal/Idol"
November 18	Misaki Sango; Hokaze Kanade	"Glass Wings"
November 25	Ichijō Ruka; Himura Nagisa	"Artemis"
December 2	Shikimiya Aone; Shiratori Amaha	"Imperial Stage"
December 22	ortensia	"Rainbow FlowerS"
2023
April 19	Tetrarkhia	"M.L.V.G"
August 25	Shikimiya Mana; Hoshizaki Akari	"O.N.×STAGE!" (オン×ステージ！)
October 30	Shikimiya Aone; Sumeragi Setsuna	"Prominence"
December 25	Aster Reve	"Lots of love"
2024
January 31	Trium Tone	"Izayoi Abundance" (誘宵アバンダンス)
January 31	Archouchou	"Karari Korori" (カラリコロリ)

=== Albums ===
Release date	Artist	Title	Note
May 17, 2017	KiRaRe	Kirarhythm (キラリズム)	KiRaRe 1st album
March 7, 2018	Trois Anges	CAMPANELLA	Trois Anges 1st mini album
March 7, 2018	Tetrarkhia	Raise Your Fist	Tetrarkhia 1st mini album
January 30, 2019	Stellamaris	Q.E.D.	Stellamaris 1st album
February 27, 2019	Ortensia	Pullulate	Ortensia 1st album
October 2, 2019	KiRaRe	DRe:AMER -KiRaRe ver.-	TV animation insert song mini album
October 2, 2019	Ortensia	DRe:AMER -Ortensia ver.	TV animation insert song mini album
October 2, 2019	Stellamaris	DRe:AMER -Stellamaris ver.	TV animation insert song mini album
November 6, 2019	Trois Anges	Loved One	TV animation mini album
November 6, 2019	Tetrarkhia	Be the CHANGE.	TV animation mini album
December 16, 2020	KiRaRe; Ortensia; Stellamaris; Trois Anges; Tetrarkhia	Chain of Dream	Concept mini album
March 17, 2021	KiRaRe; Ortensia; Stellamaris; Trois Anges; Tetrarkhia	Re:Stage! The Best	Best album
September 7, 2022	KiRaRe; Ortensia; Stellamaris; Trois Anges; Tetrarkhia	Reboot	Concept mini album

== Media ==
=== Light novel ===
Three light novel voluems written by Team Yoree (Yoriko Tomita, Yasuko Kamo and Tatsuhiko Urahata) and illustrated by Tsubasu Izumi, Marehosi Gakuen Takao School Art Club and Matsuda98 was released on March 10, 2016, by Kadokawa Shoten.

No.	Release date	ISBN
1	March 10, 2016	978-4041040645
2	January 26, 2017	978-4041050859
3	August 10, 2018	978-4041050897

=== Video games ===
A mobile rhythm game developed by Hotarubi titled Re:Stage! Prism Step (Re:ステージ！プリズムステップ, Risutēji Purizumu Suteppu) was released on July 31, 2017, for Android and August 5, 2017, for iOS. In addition, in Sega's arcade music game Ongeki (Summer Plus and R.E.D.), the characters and songs of Re:Stage! will appear as a collaboration in 2020 and 2021.

==== Collaborations ====
Re: Stage! Prism Step has collaborated with the following works in the past.

- Yuruyuri in 2018
- Lucky Star in 2018
- Ongeki
  - Ongeki Summer Plus in 2020
  - Ongeki R.E.D. in 2021
- The Demon Girl Next Door in 2020
- Battle Athletes Victory ReSTART! in 2021
- Dropout Idol Fruit Tart in 2021

=== Anime ===
An anime adaptation was announced on July 1, 2018, during the annual live event at Yamano Hall, titled Re:Stage! Dream Days♪ (Re:ステージ！ ドリームデイズ♪, Risutēji Dorīmu Deizu♪). The series is animated by Yumeta Company and Graphinica, and aired from July 7 to September 29, 2019, on Tokyo MX and BS Fuji. The series is directed by Shin Katagai, with Team Yoree handling series composition, Motohiro Taniguchi designing the characters based upon Tsubasu Izumi's character designs, and Kohta Yamamoto composing the music. The series ran for 12 episodes. The idol group KiRaRe performed the series' opening theme song "Don't think, Smile!!", as well as the series' ending theme song "Akogare Future Sign". (Note: The coupling song of the single CD "Don't think, Smile!!" is "Akogare Future Sign (Piano Strings Arrange)", but the ending song of the anime is the original "Akogare Future Sign".) Sentai Filmworks has licensed the series.

==== Episode list ====
No.	Title (Note: All English titles are taken from HIDIVE.)	Directed by	Written by	Storyboarded by	Original release date
1	"Stick Together, Lyrical Tradition Dance Club"; Transliteration: "Kuttsukete, Yōbuyōbu" (Japanese: くっつけて、謡舞踊部)	Takushi Shikatani, Harume Kosaka	Tatsuhiko Urahata	Shin Katagai	July 7, 2019
2	"Nothing More Than a Water Flea"; Transliteration: "Kanzen ni Mijinko" (Japanese: 完全にミジンコ)	Shigeru Kimiya	Tatsuhiko Urahata	Shigeru Kimiya	July 14, 2019
3	"Didn't I Say I'm Not Interested?"; Transliteration: "Kyōmi Naitte Ittayo ne" (Japanese: 興味ないって言ったよね)	Akira Yamada	Yoriko Tomita	Kōjin Ochi	July 21, 2019
4	"It's Over for Mii"; Transliteration: "Mō Owarida Mii" (Japanese: もう終わりだみぃ)	Shinichirō Ueda	Yasuko Kamo	Takahiro Natori	July 28, 2019
5	"Umekobucha Drinking Party"; Transliteration: "Umekobucha Nomitai" (Japanese: 梅こぶ茶飲み隊)	Noriyuki Nakamura	Tatsuhiko Urahata	Yutaka Kagawa, Shin Katagai	August 4, 2019
6	"Yukari-chan is My Aunt"; Transliteration: "Yukari-chan wa Watashi no Obasan" (Japanese: 紫ちゃんは私のおばさん)	Naoyuki Kuzuya	Yasuko Kamo	Naoyuki Kuzuya	August 11, 2019
7	"She is My Senpai, But Maybe I Should Shut Her Up"; Transliteration: "Senpai to wa Ie Sukoshi Damaraseru Beki ka" (Japanese: 先輩とはいえ少し黙らせるべきか)	Kiyoto Nakajima, Yutaka Kagawa (Note: Credited in the episode from the website, but not on the broadcast and Blu-ray episode.)	Yoriko Tomita	Kiyoto Nakajima, Yutaka Kagawa, Shin Katagai	August 18, 2019
8	"I Won't Do It For Free"; Transliteration: "Nō Gyara Nanka de Yatte Rarenai" (Japanese: ノーギャラなんかでやってられない)	Takahiro Natori	Yasuko Kamo	Hiroshi Hara, Shin Katagai	August 25, 2019
9	"I'll Go Ahead and Contact Her Parents"; Transliteration: "Mukō no Oyagosan ni wa Watashi kara Renraku Shite Oku wa" (Japanese: 向こうの親御さんには私から連絡しておくわ)	Shinichirō Ueda	Yoriko Tomita	Naoyuki Kuzuya	September 1, 2019
10	"Their Power Levels are Rapidly Increasing"; Transliteration: "Sentōryoku ga Dondon Jōshō Shite iru" (Japanese: 戦闘力がどんどん上昇している)	Akira Shimizu	Yoriko Tomita, Yasuko Kamo	Shigeru Kimiya	September 8, 2019
11	"A Bad Poem is a Bad Poem"; Transliteration: "Da Poemu wa Da Poemu" (Japanese: 駄ポエムは駄ポエム)	Yūsuke Onoda	Tatsuhiko Urahata	Naoyuki Kuzuya	September 22, 2019
12	"This is Our..."; Transliteration: "Kore ga, Watashitachi no" (Japanese: これが、私たちの)	Takushi Shikatani, Shin Katagai	Yoriko Tomita	Kōjin Ochi, Shin Katagai	September 29, 2019
