= Akari Kitō =

Japanese voice actress (born 1994)

- 鬼頭 明里
- Born: October 16, 1994 (age 32); Nagoya, Aichi Prefecture, Japan
- Occupations: Voice actress; singer
- Years active: 2014–present
- Agent: Raccoon Dog
- Notable work: Adachi and Shimamura as Sakura Adachi; Blend S as Kaho Hinata; Classroom of the Elite as Suzune Horikita; A Couple of Cuckoos as Erika Amano; The Demon Girl Next Door as Momo Chiyoda; Demon Slayer: Kimetsu no Yaiba as Nezuko Kamado; Fly Me to the Moon as Tsukasa Yuzaki; In/Spectre as Kotoko Iwanaga; Love Live! Nijigasaki High School Idol Club as Kanata Konoe; Reborn to Master the Blade: From Hero-King to Extraordinary Squire as Inglis Eucus; Record of Grancrest War as Siluca Meletes; Shadows House as Kate; Taboo Tattoo as Arhabyata; Time Bokan 24 as Calen; Toilet-Bound Hanako-kun as Nene Yashiro; Wataten!: An Angel Flew Down to Me as Noa Himesaka; The Ramparts of Ice as Momoka Kuriki; Ninjala as Berecca; Umamusume: Pretty Derby as Seiun Sky
- Height: 153 cm (5 ft 0 in)
- Musical career
- Genres: J-pop; Anison
- Instrument: Vocals
- Years active: 2019–present
- Label: Pony Canyon
- Website: kitoakari.com

Akari Kitō (鬼頭 明里, Kitō Akari; born October 16, 1994) is a Japanese voice actress and singer affiliated with Raccoon Dog. She starred in her first main role for the series Time Bokan 24, and has since received more major and leading roles. Her nickname is Akarin. She made her debut as a solo singer under Pony Canyon in October 2019.

== Biography ==
Born in Nagoya, Kitō became interested with anime, manga, and video games under her father's influence. Kitō was a bassist in the light music club, inspired from Kakifly's manga series K-On!. She wanted to become an illustrator and apply for a scholarship, but her parents could not afford to pay for the university education. Before Kitō moved to Tokyo and became a voice actress, her grandmother died, and some jobs became scarce for low finances.

== Filmography ==
=== Anime series ===
Year	Title	Role	Source
2014	Gugure! Kokkuri-san	Classmate A	
2014	Invaders of the Rokujouma!?	Maki Aika	
2014	Wolf Girl and Black Prince	Kana Yajima	
2014	Yuki Yuna Is a Hero	Female student A	
2015	Cross Ange	Mary	
2015	Lance N' Masques	Boy A	
2015	World Break: Aria of Curse for a Holy Swordsman	Female clerk	
2016	Erased	Hiromi Sugita (child)	
2016	Lostorage incited WIXOSS	Female students, Rio's friend	
2016	Shōnen Maid	Akira Nakaijima	
2016	Taboo Tattoo	Aryabahta	
2016	Time Bokan 24	Calen	
2017	Alice & Zoroku	Yonaga Hinagiri	
2017	Blend S	Kaho Hinata	
2017	Classroom of the Elite	Suzune Horikita	
2017	Minami Kamakura High School Girls Cycling Club	Black	
2017	Time Bokan 24: The Villains' Strike Back	Calen	
2017	Tsuredure Children	Kana Ijima	
2017	UQ Holder! Magister Negi Magi! 2	Mizore Yukihiro	
2018	Aikatsu Friends!	Kazune Yuki (age 9), Rinna Shinkai	
2018	Harukana Receive	Ai Tanahara	
2018	Last Period	Kikazaru	
2018	Lostorage conflated WIXOSS	Reira	
2018	Ms. Koizumi Loves Ramen Noodles	Misa Nakamura	
2018	Record of Grancrest War	Siluca Meletes	
2018	Seven Senses of the Reunion	Satsuki Usui	
2018	SSSS.Gridman	Hass	
2018	Umamusume: Pretty Derby	Seiun Sky	
2019	Aikatsu on Parade!	Rinna Shinkai	
2019	Demon Slayer: Kimetsu no Yaiba	Nezuko Kamado	
2019	Hitori Bocchi no Marumaru Seikatsu	Aru Honshō	
2019	Re:Stage! Dream Days♪	Sayu Tsukisaki	
2019	The Demon Girl Next Door	Momo Chiyoda	
2019	The Ones Within	Karin Sarayashiki	
2019	Wataten!: An Angel Flew Down to Me	Noa Himesaka	
2020	Adachi and Shimamura	Sakura Adachi	
2020	Fly Me to the Moon	Tsukasa Tsukuyomi	
2020	In/Spectre	Kotoko Iwanaga	
2020	Love Live! Nijigasaki High School Idol Club	Kanata Konoe	
2020	Toilet-Bound Hanako-kun	Nene Yashiro	
2021	Battle Athletes Victory ReSTART!	Lydia Gurtland	
2021	Battle Game in 5 Seconds	Yan	
2021	Demon Slayer: Kimetsu no Yaiba – Entertainment District Arc	Nezuko Kamado	
2021	Ex-Arm	Arma	
2021	Kimi to Fit Boxing	Karen	
2021	Shadows House	Kate	
2021	Shinkansen Henkei Robo Shinkalion Z	Abuto Usui	
2021	Sorcerous Stabber Orphen: Battle of Kimluck	Mädchen Amick	
2021	The Great Jahy Will Not Be Defeated!	Su	
2021	The Hidden Dungeon Only I Can Enter	Luna Heela	
2021	Tsukimichi: Moonlit Fantasy	Mio	
2022	A Couple of Cuckoos	Erika Amano	
2022	Akebi's Sailor Uniform	Touko Usagihara	
2022	Aru Asa Dummy Head Mike ni Natteita Ore-kun no Jinsei	Panda Kuramae	
2022	Birdie Wing: Golf Girls' Story	Eve	
2022	Classroom of the Elite 2nd Season	Suzune Horikita	
2022	Engage Kiss	Kanna Ogata	
2022	Love Live! Nijigasaki High School Idol Club 2nd Season	Kanata Konoe	
2022	Mamekichi Mameko NEET no Nichijō	Mameko Mamekichi	
2022	Ninjala	Berecca	
2022	Prima Doll	Retzel	
2022	Shadows House 2nd Season	Kate	
2022	The Demon Girl Next Door Season 2	Momo Chiyoda	
2023	A Girl & Her Guard Dog	Isaku Senagaki	
2023	Birdie Wing: Golf Girls' Story Season 2	Eve	
2023	Chibi Godzilla Raids Again	Younger Shobijin sister	
2023	Chillin' in My 30s After Getting Fired from the Demon King's Army	Lady	
2023	Demon Slayer: Kimetsu no Yaiba – Swordsmith Village Arc	Nezuko Kamado	
2023	Fly Me to the Moon 2nd Season	Tsukasa Tsukuyomi	
2023	I Got a Cheat Skill in Another World and Became Unrivaled in the Real World, Too	Kaori Hōjō	
2023	I'm Giving the Disgraced Noble Lady I Rescued a Crash Course in Naughtiness	Liselotte Crawford	
2023	In/Spectre 2nd Season	Kotoko Iwanaga	
2023	KamiKatsu	Mitama	
2023	Reborn to Master the Blade: From Hero-King to Extraordinary Squire	Inglis Eucus	
2023	The Reincarnation of the Strongest Exorcist in Another World	Maybell Crane	
2024	2.5 Dimensional Seduction	Mikari Tachibana	
2024	A Terrified Teacher at Ghoul School!	Beniko Zashiki	
2024	Blue Box	Hina Chono	
2024	Chained Soldier	Kyōka Uzen	
2024	Classroom of the Elite 3rd Season	Suzune Horikita	
2024	Delicious in Dungeon	Benichidori	
2024	Go! Go! Loser Ranger!	Angelica Yukino	
2024	Gods' Games We Play	Leoleshea	
2024	Mission: Yozakura Family	Futaba Yozakura	
2024	Sasaki and Peeps	Otonari-san	
2024	Tales of Wedding Rings	Hime	
2024	The Banished Former Hero Lives as He Pleases	Anriette	
2024	Tsukimichi: Moonlit Fantasy 2nd Season	Mio	
2025	Bad Girl	Momiji Kaname	
2025	Gnosia	SQ	
2025	Maebashi Witches	Yua Hosaka	
2025	Okinawa de Suki ni Natta Ko ga Hōgen Sugite Tsurasugiru	Hina Kyan	
2025	Plus-Sized Misadventures in Love!	Saki Tamai	
2025	Princession Orchestra	Sumire Kazahana/Flower Knight Sincere/Princess Viola	
2025	Si-Vis: The Sound of Heroes	μ	
2026	Horror Collector	Umi Kamijo	
2026	Kunon the Sorcerer Can See	Mirika	
2026	Magical Girl Raising Project: Restart	@Meow-Meow	
2026	Scum of the Brave	Aki Jogamine	
2026	The Ramparts of Ice	Momoka Kuriki	
2027	Bride of the Barrier Master	Hana Ichise	
2027	The Guy She Was Interested in Wasn't a Guy at All	Aya Osawa	

=== Original net animation ===
Year	Title	Role	Source
2020	Cagaster of an Insect Cage	Lydi	
2023	Yakitori: Soldiers of Misfortune	Amalia Schulz	
2025	Koisuru One Piece	Sato Yoshioka	
2025	Yu-Gi-Oh! Card Game The Chronicles	Eria	
2026	Love Through a Prism	Sakura Kobayakawa	
2026	Cyberpunk: Edgerunners 2	Talia Yang	

=== Anime films ===
Year	Title	Role	Source
2020	Demon Slayer: Kimetsu no Yaiba – The Movie: Mugen Train	Nezuko Kamado	
2022	Deemo: Memorial Keys	Sania	
2022	Wataten!: An Angel Flew Down to Me: Precious Friends	Noa Himesaka	
2023	Gridman Universe	Hassu	
2023	My Next Life as a Villainess: All Routes Lead to Doom! The Movie	Nashiit	
2024	Ganbatte Ikimasshoi	Miyoko Hyōdō	
2024	Pui Pui Molcar The Movie MOLMAX	Otohime	
2025	Demon Slayer: Kimetsu no Yaiba – The Movie: Infinity Castle	Nezuko Kamado	

=== TV drama ===
Year	Title	Role	Source
2026	Vivant (season 2)	Newscaster (ep 11 ~1 in the season~)	

=== Video games ===
Year	Title	Role	Notes	Source
2015	Kantai Collection	Maestrale, Libeccio, Kazagumo, Kishinami, Okinami		
2016	Akiba's Beat	Acquire-chan		
2017	Re:Stage! Prism Step	Sayu Tsukisaki		
2017	Magia Record: Puella Magi Madoka Magica Side Story	Emiri Kisaki, Shigure Miyabi		
2017	Yuki Yuna is a Hero: Hanayui no Kirameki	Misaki Tenma		
2018	Azur Lane	Nagara, Isuzu, Abukuma, Hass		
2018	Record of Grancrest War	Siluca Meletes		
2019	Alice Gear Aegis	Yasuri Araime		
2019	AI: The Somnium Files	Aiba		
2019	Love Live! School Idol Festival - All Stars	Kanata Konoe		
2019	Bloodstained: Ritual of the Night	Anne		
2019	Touhou Cannonball	Hakurei Reimu		
2019	Arknights	Silence		
2020	Fate/Grand Order	Erice Utsumi		
2020	Granblue Fantasy	Illnott		
2020	Ninjala	Berecca		
2020	Princess Connect! Re:Dive	Nagare Misora		
2020	Genshin Impact	Barbara		
2020	Girls' Frontline	AK-ALFA		
2020	ALTDEUS: Beyond Chronos	Chloe		
2020	Illusion Connect	Ming		
2020	Fitness Boxing 2: Rhythm and Exercise	Karen		
2020	Pokémon Masters EX	Serena		
2021	Kanda Alice mo Suiri Suru.	Akira Hodaka		
2021	Blue Archive	Mashiro Shizuyama		
2021	Alchemy Stars	Hiiro, Chandra		
2021	Cookie Run: Kingdom	Latte Cookie		
2021	Umamusume: Pretty Derby	Seiun Sky		
2021	Neo: The World Ends With You	Shoka Sakurane		
2022	Artery Gear: Fusion	Maika, Lobelia		
2022	AI: The Somnium Files – Nirvana Initiative	Aiba		
2022	Made in Abyss: Binary Star Falling into Darkness	"Deep in Abyss" Mode main character		
2022	Valkyrie Elysium	Valkyrie		
2022	River City Girls 2	Provie		
2022	Goddess of Victory: Nikke	Pepper		
2022	Dragon Quest Treasures	Cecily, Monsters		
2022	Yurukill: The Calumniation Games	Izane Akegarasu		
2023	Towa Tsugai	Mozu		
2023	Sudama Relation	Irimajiri		
2023	Fire Emblem Engage	Céline		
2023	404 Game Re:set	After Burner		
2023	Resident Evil 4	Ashley Graham		
2023	Xenoblade Chronicles 3: Future Redeemed	Na'el		
2024	Ex Astris	Vi^{3}		
2024	Racing Master	Arishima Star		
2024	Reynatis	Sari Nishijima		
2025	Rusty Rabbit	Wrex		
2026	Zenless Zone Zero	Promeia		
2026	Puella Magi Madoka Magica: Magia Exedra	Emiri Kisaki		
2027	Romancing SaGa 3: Destinies United	Monika Ausbach		

=== Drama CDs ===
- No Anime No Life ~Tower Anime is the Place for You~ (2015) – Female customer A
- Umamusume: Pretty Derby Starting Gate (2018) – Seiun Sky
- Ai no Hakoniwa a Heartwarming Garden (2018) – Camellia
- 1-nen A-gumi no Monster (2021) – Nagisa Okina
- YUKI X AOI Chimera Project (2022) – Mandy
- Prima Doll Kuronekotei no Kyuujitsu ~Hajimete no Otomari Onsen Ryokou ni Shuppatsu desu♪~ (2022) – Retzel
- The Guy She Was Interested in Wasn't a Guy at All (2024) – Aya Osawa

=== Dubbing ===
==== Live-action ====
- Doctor Strange in the Multiverse of Madness (America Chavez)
- The Exorcist: Believer (Katherine)
- Gran Turismo (Audrey)
- Shazam! Fury of the Gods (Anthea)

==== Animation ====
- The Boss Baby: Family Business (Creepy Girl)
- PAW Patrol: The Mighty Movie (Mini)

== Discography ==
=== Singles ===
Year	No.	Single details	Peak Oricon chart position
2019	1	"Swinging Heart": Released: October 16, 2019; Label: Pony Canyon	11
2020	2	"Desire Again": Released: February 26, 2020; Label: Pony Canyon	14
2020	3	"Koi no Uta": Released: October 10, 2020; Label: Pony Canyon	-
2020	4	"Kimi no Tonari de": Released: October 28, 2020; Label: Pony Canyon	10

=== Mini albums ===
Year	No.	Album details	Peak Oricon chart position
2021	1	"Kaleidoscope": Released: August 4, 2021; Label: Pony Canyon	

=== Albums ===
Year	No.	Album details	Peak Oricon chart position
2020	1	"Style": Released: June 10, 2020; Label: Pony Canyon	7
2022	2	"Luminous": Released: October 12, 2022; Label: Pony Canyon	13
