= Mitsuboshi Colors =

Japanese manga and anime series

- Volume 1 cover, featuring (left to right) Kotoha, Yui, and Sat-chan

三ツ星カラーズ (Mitsuboshi Karāzu)
- Genre: Comedy; Slice of life
- Manga
- Written by: Katsuwo
- Published by: ASCII Media Works
- Magazine: Dengeki Daioh
- Original run: July 26, 2014 – June 27, 2020
- Volumes: 8
- Anime television series
- Directed by: Tomoyuki Kawamura
- Produced by: Mitsuhiro Ogata; Fuminori Yamazaki; Shinpei Yamashita; Mitsuhiro Nanbara; Yumiko Kobayashi; Isao Ishikawa
- Written by: Shōgo Yasukawa
- Music by: Michiru
- Studio: Silver Link
- Licensed by: NA: Sentai Filmworks
- Original network: AT-X, BS11, Tokyo MX, Sun TV, KBS
- English network: SEA: Animax Asia
- Original run: January 7, 2018 – March 25, 2018
- Episodes: 12
- icon

Mitsuboshi Colors (三ツ星カラーズ, Mitsuboshi Karāzu; lit. "Three Star Colors") is a Japanese manga series written and illustrated by Katsuwo. The manga was serialized in ASCII Media Works' Dengeki Daioh magazine from 2014 to 2020. An anime television series adaptation directed by Tomoyuki Kawamura and produced by Silver Link aired between January and March 2018.

== Premise ==
Set in Ueno, the series follows three elementary school girls named Yui, Sat-chan and Kotoha, who form an organization known as "The Colors". Together, they perform various deeds and errands to protect the peace in their town.

== Characters ==
Yui Akamatsu (赤松 結衣, Akamatsu Yui)
Voiced by: Yūki Takada (Japanese); Luci Christian (English)
Yui is a timid designated leader of the Colors. Her catchphrase is "Trigonometric functions!" She is prone to crying at the slightest provocation.
Saki Kise (Satchan) (黄瀬 沙希 (さっちゃん), Kise Saki)
Voiced by: Marika Kōno (Japanese); Monica Rial (English)
Saki is a energetic girl who comes up with crazy ideas. Her catchphrase is "Extra virgin oil!".
Kotoha Aoyama (青山 琴葉, Aoyama Kotoha)
Voiced by: Natsumi Hioka (Japanese); Brittney Karbowski (English)
Kotoha is a laid-back girl who constantly plays video games despite being bad at them. Yui often exploits this fact to tease Kotoha. Kotoha has sadistic tendencies and often likes to step on anyone she sees on the ground. Her catchphrase is "I've beaten this game!".
Saito (斎藤)
Voiced by: Atsushi Tamaru (Japanese); Blake Weir (English)
Saito is a policeman who watches over the city and constantly comes at odds with the Colors.
Daigoro Kujiraoka (鯨岡 大吾郎, Kujiraoka Daigorō) /Pops (おやじ, Oyaji)
Voiced by: Tessho Genda (Japanese); Mark X. Laskowski (English)
Daigoro is an old man who runs a general store called Whale Factory and is nicknamed "Pops" by the Colors. He comes up with various devices for the Colors to play with and is always seen wearing different sunglasses.
Saori Kise (黄瀬 沙織, Kise Saori)
Voiced by: Kaori Nazuka (Japanese); Patricia Duran (English)
Saori is Satchan's mother who runs a fruit store called Kise Fruits.
Nonoka Sasaki (笹木 ののか, Sasaki Nonoka)
Voiced by: Ayaka Asai (Japanese); Eileen Montgomery (English)
Nonoka is a high schoolgirl who works at her family bakery called Sasaki Bread. While her sister wants to convert the bakery into an onigiri store, she is keen on keeping the bakery alive and has been practicing how to bake and experimenting with different spices.
Momoka Sasaki (笹木 ももか, Sasaki Momoka)
Voiced by: Hisako Tōjō (Japanese); Kara Edwards (English)
Momoka Nonoka's older sister who is nicknamed "Moka". She knows how to make delicious varieties of onigiri and wants to convert the bakery to an onigiri store.
Subaru (すばる, Subaru)
Voiced by: Manami Numakura (Japanese); Kira Vincent-Davis (English)
Nonoka's classmate who has a lot of part-time jobs. Nonoka often jokingly tells the Colors that her friend might repeat a year in high school because of that.

== Media ==
=== Manga ===
The original manga written by Katsuwo began serialization in ASCII Media Works' Dengeki Daioh magazine on July 26, 2014. Seven tankōbon volumes have been released as of October 26, 2019. The series finished after 72 chapters, ending in the August 2020 issue of Dengeki Daioh which released on June 27, 2020.

=== Anime ===
An anime adaptation was announced at the Dengeki Comic Festival 2017 on March 12, 2017, which was later confirmed to be a television series on July 27, 2017. The anime series is being directed by Tomoyuki Kawamura and produced by Silver Link, with series composition by Shogo Yasukawa and character design by Takumi Yokota. The twelve-episode series aired in Japan between January 7 and March 25, 2018. The opening and ending themes respectively are "Colors Power ni Omakasero!" (カラーズぱわーにおまかせろ！, Leave it to Colors' Power!) and "Miracle Colors Honjitsu Mo Ijō Nashi! (ミラクルカラーズ☆本日も異常ナシ！, Mirakuru Karāzu Honjitsu Mo Ijō Nashi; Miracle Colors No Abnormalities Today Either!), both performed by Colors☆Slash (Yūki Takada, Marika Kouno, and Natsumi Hioka). Sentai Filmworks licensed the series in North America and streamed it on Hidive.

No.	Title (Note: All English episode titles are taken from Hidive.)	Original release date
1	"Colors" "Karāzu" (カラーズ)	January 7, 2018
Three elementary schoolgirls in Ueno named Yui Akamatsu, Saki Kise (Sat-chan) and Kotoha Aoyama are members of the Colors, a group dedicated to keep the peace in their town. Learning from resident policeman Saito about a pandalike cat causing trouble in town, the Colors decide to try catching it. After searching all over town, the Colors find out from Daigoro "Pops" Kujiraoka, the general store manager of Whale Factory, that a pair of novelty glasses were stolen by the pandalike cat. The Colors find the pandalike cat in their hideout, agreeing to look after it. They name it Colonel Monochrome. Soon after, Saito is targeted by the Colors with a rocket launcher. It turns out that the rocket launcher was just a toy previously bought at Whale Factory. Later on, Pops tasks the Colors to crack the code for his coffer in the form of a safe, supposedly containing hidden treasure. The Colors eventually crack the code by looking underneath a pandalike mailbox. The safe contains a food dish for Colonel Monochrome.
2	"Hide and Go Seek" "Kakurenbo" (かくれんぼ)	January 14, 2018
During a game of hide-and-seek, Sat-chan and Kotoha sneak away from Yui, who struggles to find them. Sat-chan helps Kotoha obtain bonuses for her video game via StreetPass, stopping by Ueno Station. Saito happily directs Sat-chan and Kotoha to the StreetPass Plaza in Akihabara, though Saito is later forced to tell Yui where Sat-chan and Kotoha were ultimately hiding. Soon after, the Colors find some closed off alleyways in the marketplace Ameyoko. They become curious as to why the alleyways are closed off, eventually discovering that the alleyways are covered in wet paint. Later on, the Colors receive some nattō from Sat-chan's mother Saori Kise. As the Colors visit a pond, they consult high schoolgirl Nonoka "Nono" Sasaki about how to use nattō in order to keep the pondwater clean. As Nonoka believes that the best thing to help nature is for all mankind to die out, this leads the Colors to let the pondwater be dirty in order to save mankind from being killed.
3	"Do The Chu-cabu" "Chukaburu" (チュカブル)	January 21, 2018
Saori asks the Colors to help sell the unsold bananas from her fruit store Kise Fruits. The Colors manage to sell the bananas to Pops, Nonoka, and even Saito using convincing methods. Soon after, Saori buys cosplay costumes of fictional monsters called chu-chu-cabrillas as a reward for the Colors, who then rush to bother Saito. Later on, Pops tasks the Colors to defuse a bomb with only a red wire and a blue wire. Based on the clue pertaining to which wire that they should cut, the Colors travel to the underground food street in search for a "middle eye". After having no luck with their search, the Colors encounter Nonoka, who says that some things are invisible even though they are visible. The Colors eventually figure out that the "middle eye" refers to the marketplace street sign in red letters. They clear the case and cheerfully tell Pops that they do not love their town one bit.
4	"Summer Festival" "Natsumatsuri" (夏祭り)	January 28, 2018
Yui tells Sat-chan and Kotoha that her school is participating in a weekend parade. The Colors go to Nonoka's family bakery called Sasaki Bread, where Nonoka warns them that her old sister Momoka "Moka" Sasaki plans on taking over the bakery. In fact, Momoka wants to turn the bakery into an onigiri shop when she inherits it after graduation. However, after Nonoka's baked bread samples prove to be unsavory, the Colors enjoy Momoka's delicious onigiri samples. Soon after, Yui prepares for the parade, along with her friends Hirai and Tadakoro, two students of Yumon Elementary School. Sat-chan and Kotoha watch the parade from the sidelines, witnessing Yui perform the Sansa dance. Later on, the Colors attend the summer festival at Yumon Elementary School. They all wear glowing star necklaces before enjoying the food and entertainment. After Hirai and Tadakoro talk with Yui, Saori arrives to walk the Colors home. Unfortunately, Yui's star necklace stops sparkling.
5	"Zoo" "Dōbutsuen" (どうぶつえん)	February 4, 2018
The Colors play with old toys and games from a box sent by Pops, and Saito reluctantly ends up joining in the fun. Soon after, the Colors read Faithful Elephants, a sad picture book about the elephants in Ueno Zoo during World War II. Due to fear that the animal cages would break open during an air raid, the zookeeper killed the lions, tigers and bears by poisoning their food. However, the elephants smelled the poison and chose to starve themselves to death. The Colors decide to visit Ueno Zoo with free admission in order to check if all the animals are being fed properly. Later on, they take a ride on the Ueno Zoo Monorail for a small fee, and they eventually stop by the petting zoo. By the entrance, the Colors conclude that the elephants are healthy and strong. Sat-chan feeds an apple to one of the elephants even though there is a sign that prohibits people from feeding the animals.
6	"Weakness Identification Meeting" "Jakuten Sagashi Kaigi" (弱点さがし会ぎ)	February 11, 2018
As the Colors search for edible flowers in the park, they come across Asiatic dayflowers, white clovers and dandelions. Using a pot to boil the edible flowers, the Colors discover that the edible flowers smell and taste very bad. Soon after, the Colors hold a meeting to identify each other's weaknesses. Yui does not have enough dignity to be the leader, while Sat-chan is too optimistic. However, Kotoha is bad at video games despite playing them all the time. Later on, the Colors see a statue of the great samurai Saigō Takamori, believing that he was a covert photographer. The Colors convince Pops to put Colonel Monochrome in a toy wagon in order to operate a camera. In hopes of being immortalized as statues, the Colors take photos all over the marketplace before returning to Pops. As the Colors go bother Saito, Pops arrives with the printed photos, including a candid shot of a chu-chu-cabrilla supposedly seen in the marketplace. The Colors then head home for curfew.
7	"Trick or Treat" "Torikku oa Torīto" (トリック・オア・トリート)	February 18, 2018
After school, Yui and Kotoha talk about Sat-chan getting in trouble for putting superglue on a unicycle seat. Before Sat-chan arrives, Yui undermines Kotoha for being bad at a new video game that she bought three days ago. As part of Sat-chan's punishment, the Colors plan to gather litter. Using Saito's advice to play it smart, the Colors pick up trash from the garbage can in the park. Soon after, Yui shares candy with Sat-chan and Kotoha. When the Colors investigate a peculiar smell in the park, they wind up collecting stinky yet edible ginkgo nuts. The Colors then throw the ginkgo nuts at Saito. Later on, the Colors dress up for Halloween and decide to play a "zombie game", in which Yui must prevent Sat-chan and Kotoha from filling the park with zombies. Agreeing to play along as zombies, Nonoka and her classmate Subaru start convincing others to play along. Yui finds out how to not become a zombie and manages to defeat the boss zombie. The Colors finally go trick-or-treating, though they completely forget to bother Saito.
8	"Museum" "Hakubutsukan" (はくぶつかん)	February 25, 2018
Yui, Sat-chan and Kotoha play the respective roles of a straight man, a funny man and an enabler, though Yui does not fit her role. The Colors head to the National Museum of Nature and Science for free admission in search for a new member. They see a giant rocket launcher model, a dinosaur exhibit and a wild animal display. Soon after, the Colors meet the museum curator, who gives interesting facts about the Tyrannosaurus rex. The Colors are not allowed to have the Tyrannosaurus rex as their straight man, though they plan on visiting the museum again. Later on, the Colors spot Subaru hosting a raffle for a lottery at Ueno Station. With the first prize being a vacation to Hawaii, Subaru tells the Colors that they must acquire five lottery tickets through store purchases at a chance to win a prize. The Colors visit Nonoka at Sasaki Bread, eventually persuading her to give them three lottery tickets for free. As they return to Ueno Station, the Colors soon convince Momoka to trade her two lottery tickets for many pocket tissues. The Colors only manage to win more pocket tissues as the fifth prize.
9	"One-Coin Sat-chan" "Wan Koin Satchan" (ワンコインさっちゃん)	March 4, 2018
The Colors go to a gun shop in order to buy a weapon with three coins given to them during New Year's Day worth 500 Japanese yen each, but the shop owner sporting an afro cannot sell weapons to children. Instead, the Colors settle on buying three walkie-talkies from Pops at Whale Factory. Soon after, the Colors visit the Hanazono Shrine, where Colonel Monochrome wanders into. The Colors follow Colonel Monochrome across town, though Yui loses her hair tie in the process. They head from the shrine through the park back to their hideout, where Colonel Monochrome finds Yui's hair tie. Later on, the Colors eat out a tin of butter cookies. They decide to use the tin as a time capsule filled with various things to give themselves in ten years. However, they struggle to find a landmark to bury the time capsule. In front of a tree at the park, Nonoka adds her baby picture in the time capsule. The Colors ultimately decide to let Pops hang onto the time capsule at Whale Factory.
10	"Snowing Too Far" "Yuki Sugiru" (雪すぎる)	March 11, 2018
On a snowy day, the Colors eventually decide to have a snowball fight with Saito. Soon after, Colonel Monochrome gives the Colors an ema, which contains a message about a secret being out. Believing that whoever wrote the message knows about their hideout, the Colors covertly head to the temple in search for some clues. They meet the temple priest, whose secret toupée is exposed during a wind gust. Later on, the Colors go to Kise Fruits, where Saori tells them that her lucky cat statue was allegedly stolen three hours ago by an unknown thief leaving behind a note. Sat-chan makes the case more challenging by vowing to speak only once until the case is solved. After having no leads, the Colors soon discover that the note is powdered in bread flour. They find the lucky cat statue at Sasaki Bread and realize that the thief is none other than Nonoka. However, the lucky cat statue actually belongs to Nonoka, and Sat-chan had stolen it earlier.
11	"Hyper Hide-and-Seek" "Haipā Kakurenbo" (ハイパーかくれんぼ)	March 18, 2018
When Nonoka catches hay fever during pollen season, the Colors try hitting her in order to stop the sneezing, but to no avail. Soon after, the Colors prepare to uproot all the trees in town as revenge, but they are unable to do it. Momoka spots the Colors and tells them that Nonoka is only allergic to pollen from Japanese cedar. Furthermore, Momoka claims that Nonoka's hay fever is only in her head since there are no Japanese cedars located in or near the park. Later on, the Colors play a game of "hyper hide-and-seek" using their walkie-talkies. Yui passes by Whale Factory, where Pops says that the walkie-talkies have a range of thirty meters. She then passes by Kise Fruits, where Saito says that Sat-chan and Kotoha are at Ueno Station. After Yui finds Kotoha, the two search all over town for Sat-chan, finding her lying on the sidewalk wearing a chu-chu-cabrilla costume, though unbeknownst to Yui and Kotoha.
12	"Colors, the Town, and the People" "Karāzu to Machi to Hitobito" (カラーズと街とひとびと)	March 25, 2018
The Colors film a video highlighting the town and its people, including Pops, Saori, Nonoka, Momoka and Saito. Soon after, the Colors set off to tackle a case at the korokke shop, but they get distracted by a playground along the way. Later on, the cherry blossoms have bloomed for springtime. The Colors try to sell some strawberries from Kise Fruits to all the picnickers in the park in order to earn money to buy some mini-cakes. With one pack of strawberries left, the Colors successfully manage to sell it to a lonely man. The Colors then get to enjoy their well-earned mini-cakes. Afterwards, they drag a futon into the middle of the park in order to relax while doing surveillance.

== Reception ==
The anime received mixed reviews. Paul Jensen of Anime News Network said that it does not "quite translate into anything truly memorable" and its early episodes focus too much on the characters "key personality traits". He said the anime is "still perfectly watchable in these early scenes" and that by Episode 4 of the anime, it has a "comfortable rhythm" that balances humor and jokes, saying it reminded him of Non Non Biyori. He ended that the series is "entertaining to watch" and relaxing, but is not "genuinely memorable" and criticized the animation and art for being "above average". However, while reviewing the first episode, Rebecca Silverman of the same website described it as a "cute girls show" she can "get behind"; Theron Martin called it "charming"; Nick Creamer called it a "a joy from start to finish"; Lynzee Loveridge was more critical.

== See also ==
- Hitori Bocchi no Marumaru Seikatsu – Another manga series by the same author
- I'm Looking for Zombies – Another manga series by the same author
- Love Live! Nijigasaki High School Idol Club – Another anime series directed by Tomoyuki Kawamura
