= Fumi Morisawa =

Japanese voice actress

- Born: October 21; Tokyo, Japan
- Occupation: Voice actress
- Website: http://profit-v.com/pro/talent_morisawa.html

Fumi Morisawa (森沢 芙美, Morisawa Fumi, born October 21) is a Japanese voice actress.

== Voice roles ==
=== Anime ===
- Black Blood Brothers, Chan's mother
- Elemental Gelade, Daya; Garne
- Gakuen Utopia Manabi Straight! (OAV), Mika's mother
- GaoGaiGar: King of Braves, Intestine; Mother Kaidô
- Kimi ni Todoke, Yoko Chiba
- Koe de Oshigoto!, Fuyumi Hirobe
- Kono Aozora ni Yakusoku o: Yōkoso Tsugumi Ryō e, Umi Hayama
- MoonPhase, Elfriede's mother
- Noramimi, Taizou's mother
- Oneechan ga Kita, Yūko Mizuhara
- Persona: Trinity Soul, Haruka Kanzato
- Popotan, Nurse 1
- Red Garden, Isabel
- Slayers, Girl
- Slayers Revolution, Waitress
- Venus Versus Virus, Sonoka
- White Album, Yamamoto
- World Break: Aria of Curse for a Holy Swordsman, Vasilisa Yuryevna Mostvaya

=== OVA ===
- Koe de Oshigoto!, Fuyumi Hirobe
