= C2C (studio) =

Japanese animation studio

C2C Co., Ltd.
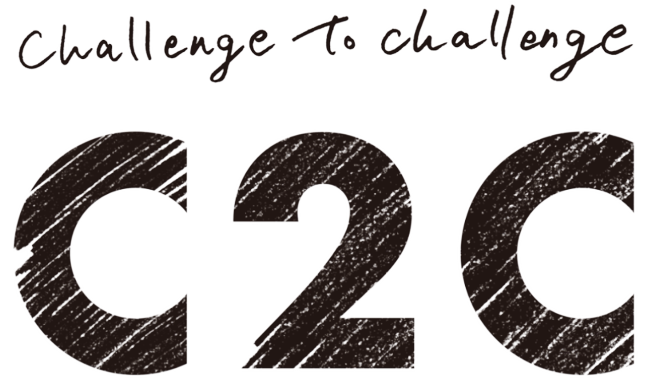
- Native name: 株式会社C2C
- Romanized name: Kabushiki-gaisha C2C
- Type: Kabushiki gaisha
- Industry: Japanese animation
- Founded: April 3, 2006; 20 years ago
- Founder: Andy Song (Song In-Gyu); Ryousuke Yamada
- Headquarters: Tokyo, Japan
- Key people: Ryousuke Yamada (president)
- Number of employees: 78
- Parent: Triple A
- Divisions: C2C Tokyo Studio; C2C Kumamoto Studio
- Website: www.c2c2009.com/en

C2C Co., Ltd. (Japanese: 株式会社C2C, Hepburn: Kabushiki-gaisha C2C) is a Japanese animation studio established in April 2006.

== Works ==
=== Television series ===
Year	Title	Director(s)	Animation producer(s)	Source	Eps.	Refs.
2012	Yurumates 3D	Tomohiro Yamanishi (chief); Yoshihide Yuuzumi		Manga	26	
2014	Oneechan ga Kita	Yoshihide Yuuzumi	Ryousuke Yamada	Manga	12	
2014	Go! Go! 575 (co-animated with Lay-duce)	Takefumi Anzai	Ryousuke Yamada	Mixed-media project	4	
2014	M3: The Dark Metal (co-animated with Satelight)	Junichi Sato	Fumio Kaneko	Original work	24	
2015	Aquarion Logos (co-animated with Satelight)	Hidezaku Sato	Ryousuke Yamada; Yuusuke Watanabe	Original work (franchise)	26	
2017	WorldEnd (co-animated with Satelight)	Junichi Wada	Ryousuke Yamada; Fumio Kaneko	Light novel	12	
2018	Harukana Receive	Toshiyuki Kubooka	Ryousuke Yamada; Yousuke Shimada	Manga	12	
2019	Hitori Bocchi no Marumaru Seikatsu	Takefumi Anzai	Ryousuke Yamada; Yousuke Shimada	Manga	12	
2020	Shachibato! President, It's Time for Battle!	Hiroki Ikeshita	Yousuke Shimada	Online game	12	
2020	Wandering Witch: The Journey of Elaina	Toshiyuki Kubooka	Kazumasa Hayasaka	Light novel	12	
2021	Tsukimichi: Moonlit Fantasy	Shinji Ishihira	Yousuke Shimada; Shouhei Tsukuda	Light novel	12	
2021	PuraOre! Pride of Orange	Takefumi Anzai	Kazumasa Hayasaka	Mixed-media project	12	
2022	Reincarnated as a Sword	Shinji Ishihira	Yousuke Shimada	Light novel	12	
2023	Handyman Saitō in Another World	Toshiyuki Kubooka	Kazumasa Hayasaka	Manga	12	
2023	Otaku Elf	Takefumi Anzai	Ryousuke Yamada	Manga	12	
2023	Shangri-La Frontier	Toshiyuki Kubooka	Ryousuke Yamada; Line producer: Kazumasa Hayasaka	Web novel	50	

=== OVA/ONAs ===
Year	Title	Director(s)	Animation producer(s)	Source	Eps.	Refs.
2014	Go! Go! 575: Meippai ni, Hajiketeru? (co-animated with Lay-duce)	Takefumi Anzai	Ryousuke Yamada	Mixed-media project	1	
2015	Oneechan ga Kita	Yoshihide Yuuzumi		Manga	1	
2016–2017	Tenchi Muyo! Ryo-Ohki 4 (co-animated with AIC)	Masaki Kajishima (chief); Hidetoshi Takahashi		Original work (franchise)	4	

== Notable staff ==
=== Representative staff ===
- Ryousuke Yamada (founder and president)

=== Animation producers ===
- Yousuke Shimada (2012~present)
- Kazumasa Hayasaka (2015~present)
- Tsukuda Shouhei (2016~present)
