= Tsukimichi: Moonlit Fantasy =

Japanese light novel series and its adaptations

- First light novel volume cover, featuring (from left to right) Mio, Makoto Misumi, and Tomoe

月が導く異世界道中 (Tsuki ga Michibiku Isekai Dōchū)
- Genre: Isekai
- Novel series
- Written by: Kei Azumi
- Published by: Shōsetsuka ni Narō (2012–16); AlphaPolis (2016–present)
- Original run: 2012 – present
- Light novel
- Written by: Kei Azumi
- Illustrated by: Mitsuaki Matsumoto
- Published by: AlphaPolis
- English publisher: NA: Hanashi Media
- Original run: May 28, 2013 – present
- Volumes: 20
- Manga
- Written by: Kei Azumi
- Illustrated by: Kotora Kino
- Published by: AlphaPolis
- English publisher: Alpha Manga
- Original run: June 10, 2015 – present
- Volumes: 16
- Anime television series
- Directed by: Shinji Ishihira
- Produced by: List: Hiroyuki Aoi; Cao Cong; Teppei Oota; Yoshiteru Maeda; Gaku Nakagawa; Airi Sawada (S1); Takumi Itou (S1); Nao Ooji (S1); Hirotaka Kaneko (S1); Hajime Maruyama (S1); Ten Nomiyama (Note: Unknown romanization of 野見山展) (S1); Yuito Hirahara (S2); Ima Tamura (S2); Taiki Kakizaki (S2); Mina Yamaoka (S2); Waka Suzuki (S2); Akihiro Ishiwatari (S2)
- Written by: Kenta Ihara
- Music by: Yasuharu Takanashi
- Studio: C2C (S1); J.C.Staff (S2)
- Licensed by: Crunchyroll; SA/SEA: Medialink
- Original network: Tokyo MX, MBS, BS NTV, AT-X
- English network: SEA: Animax Asia
- Original run: July 7, 2021 – present
- Episodes: 37
- icon

Tsukimichi: Moonlit Fantasy (Japanese: 月が導く異世界道中, Hepburn: Tsuki ga Michibiku Isekai Dōchū; lit. "Journey in an Alternate World Guided by the Moon") is a Japanese light novel series written by Kei Azumi and illustrated by Mitsuaki Matsumoto. It began serialization online in 2012 on the user-generated novel publishing website Shōsetsuka ni Narō, and it moved to the AlphaPolis website in 2016. It was also later acquired by AlphaPolis, who have published the series since May 2013. Hanashi Media has licensed the light novel for an English release. A manga adaptation with art by Kotora Kino has been serialized online via AlphaPolis' manga website since 2015. The manga is published digitally in English through Alpha Manga. An anime television series adaptation produced by C2C aired from July to September 2021. A second season by J.C.Staff aired from January to June 2024. A third season has been announced.

== Plot ==
High school student Makoto Misumi is an average boy in every aspect, though his sisters are high-spirited and good-looking. Behind this his parents are from a fantasy world and have eloped to Earth for various reasons. Partly due to a contract agreed upon by a goddess, Makoto is to be sent to the world of Elysion to serve as the Hero. Unfortunately, it is not the usual case that Makoto always imagined. The Goddess has a vain beauty preference and deems Makoto to be "ugly," revoking his hero title, forbidding him to interact with other humans, and he is thrown off the edge of the world. Makoto is thankfully saved by Tsukuyomi, and he is gifted with great power so he will live a free life. In contrast to the Goddess' ideals, Makoto meets various demi-humans and mythical beings who become captivated by him and join in on building a new civilization where all of them can peacefully coexist. Another problem is Makoto's aura becomes too powerful and unstable for his yearning desire to enter human society. His new companions are willing to help him in any way they can to reform society's views.

== Characters ==
=== Main characters ===
Makoto Misumi (深澄真, Misumi Makoto)
Voiced by: Natsuki Hanae (Japanese); Dallas Reid (English)
Makoto Misumi is the main protagonist of this series. He is into archery and one of three Earth dwellers who was summoned to the Goddess' World. Originally meant to be the only person to be sent to the other world as per the contract between his parents and the Goddess, due to her own preferences in beauty standards, she abandons and throws Makoto to the edge of her world into the Wasteland, while secretly kidnapping two other people from Earth and sending them to her world as Heroes. Tsukuyomi, the Moon God of Earth who worked as the middleman for the completion of the contract, helped Makoto provide him with his blessing and told him to be free and live as he wished. At the start, Makoto is thought to be stuck at level 1, but it is later revealed that the level and Adventurer systems were based on the ideas of someone from Earth who was transferred in the past. The level limit of the system was set intentionally to the 16-bit integer limit of 65,536 and Makoto is basically causing an integer overflow error. In the Goddess' World, he is also known by the alias "Raidou Kuzunoha" (in WN/LN) or "Makoto Kuzunoha" (in Manga/Anime), a powerful merchant and skilled teacher.
Tomoe (巴, Tomoe)
Voiced by: Ayane Sakura (Japanese); Monica Rial (English)
Tomoe, previously known as the Invincible "Shen" (無敵"蜃しん", Muteki "Shin"), is one of the Greater Dragons, existing in the World of the Goddess. After an accident in which Makoto destroyed her shrine gate, she makes a pact with Makoto to learn more about the way of the Samurai. Her special ability is being able to use illusion mists to distort her opponents, as well as creating a Demiplane which she uses as a mediating space. Tomoe later falls in love with Makoto, becoming one of his lovers.
Mio (澪, Mio)
Voiced by: Akari Kitō (Japanese); Kara Edwards (English)
Mio, previously known as the Black Spider of Calamity (災害の黒蜘蛛, Saigai no Kuro Gumo), is a unique existence in the Goddess' World, having terrorized humans and demi-humans for centuries in spider form due to her endless hunger and need to satisfy it. She makes a pact with Makoto (without his permission) after being convinced by Tomoe. Mio is prone to easily getting worked up over the smallest slight, but feeding her will calm her down. Her special ability is being able to harness dark magic, an element that can swallow other forms of magic. She quickly falls in love with Makoto and later becoming one of his lovers alongside Tomoe.
Shiki (識, Shiki)
Voiced by: Kenjiro Tsuda (Japanese); Ben Balmaceda (English)
Shiki (識しき), previously known as Larva, was a Lich who sought endless knowledge, in particular the path to becoming a Grant—humans who have traveled to other worlds, whether successfully or not. After some convincing from Makoto due to his desire to learn more about magic, he makes a pact with Makoto and regains a human form. Shiki currently works as an assistant for Makoto in public, helping out with his business.

=== Deities ===
The Goddess (女神, Megami)
Voiced by: Reina Ueda (Japanese); Jennifer AuBuchon (English)
The main villain of the story. She made a deal with Makoto's parents to give them a life on Earth in exchange for one of their future children to become the hero of their old world. However, because of her vain beauty preferences, the Goddess reneged on the deal; banishing Makoto to die, while kidnapping Hibiki and Tomoki to serve the role instead, one of her many misdeeds which made her lose respect from the other gods.
Tsukuyomi-no-Mikoto (月読命)
Voiced by: Tomoaki Maeno (Japanese); Reagan Murdock (English)
Tsukuyomi is a moon god who was responsible for summoning Makoto to the Goddess' world, as per the agreement made with his parents. After witnessing how Makoto was treated by the Goddess, he bestows all of his power onto Makoto and gives him the freedom to live how he wants in the Goddess' world.
It is later revealed this effectively turned Makoto into a deity himself; explaining his growth in power to godly levels which is apparently a plan from the other gods who intend to have Makoto assume the Goddess' place.

=== Demiplane/Kuzunoha Company ===
Emma (エマ, Ema)
Voiced by: Saori Hayami (Japanese); Tia Ballard (English)
Emma is an orc who was saved by Makoto from a two-headed Liz while on her way to sacrificing herself to Shen (which later turned out to be a ploy set up by the demon race). After Makoto resolves the issue for her and the entire orc village, she becomes the assistant of Makoto Misumi and she acts as the Supervisor of the Demiplane.
Beren (ベレン)
Voiced by: Shinpachi Tsuji (Japanese); Mark Stoddard (English)
Beren is an elder dwarf that Makoto Misumi met after Tomoe rescues him from the Black Spider of Calamity and is currently one of the blacksmiths of the Demiplane and the Kuzunoha Company.
He designs the magic draining gear Makoto wears to hide his overpowered aura; the gear would be fatal to anyone else as Makoto's magic is deity level.
Lime Latte (ライム・ラテ, Raimu Rate)
Voiced by: Taku Yashiro (Japanese); Aaron Campbell (English)
Lime is a former top adventurer from Tsige and currently works for the Kuzunoha Company as an employee. He is a subordinate of Tomoe who crafts him a katana. He was given some of Tomoe's blood, becoming dragonkin.

=== Tsige ===
Toa (トア)
Voiced by: Yurika Kubo (Japanese); Skyler McIntosh (English)
Toa is an adventurer who came from Tsige to Zetsuya to look for her family's long-lost dagger as well as to get stronger. Due to her failure to complete one of her quests, she fell into large amounts of debt and was forced to subject herself to prostitution (manga)/human magic experimentation (anime) by high-ranking adventurers in Zetsuya, before being rescued by Tomoe and Mio. Her face resembles that of Makoto's junior on Earth, named Hasegawa Nukumi, whom Makoto feels a certain affection towards.
Rinon (リノン)
Voiced by: Aiko Ninomiya (Japanese); Bryn Apprill (English)
Rinon is Toa's younger sister who was burdened with paying off her older sister's debt. She was forced into becoming a spy for the high-ranking adventurers of Zetsuya to spy on Makoto and his party.
Hazal (ハザル, Hazaru)
Voiced by: Yuuki Shin (Japanese); Bryson Baugus (English)
Hazal is an alchemist and a powerful adventurer who resides in Tsige. He later takes Toa, Ranina and Louisa as his wives.
Louisa (ルイザ, Ruiza)
Voiced by: Yuna Kamakura
Louisa is an elf archer whose job is "Bless Gunner" and member of the Tsige's adventurer guild.
Ranina (ラニーナ, Ranīna)
Voiced by: Saika Kitamori (Japanese); Cassie Ewulu (English)
Louisa is a dwarf warrior whose job is "Priest Knight" and member of the Tsige's adventurer guild.

=== Rotsgard Academy ===
Sif Rembrandt (シフ・レンブラント, Shifu Renburanto)
Voiced by: Yumiri Hanamori
Patrick Rembrandt's daughter and Yuno's older sister. She along her mother and sister were afflicted by a curse and saved by Makoto. Since then she enrolled into Rotsgard academy and became Makoto's student. She is proficient with magic.
After being deformed by a curse Makoto helped cure, Sif developed a crush on him; seeing inner beauty mattered more than looks.
Yuno Rembrandt (ユーノ・レンブラント, Yūno Renburanto)
Voiced by: Nene Hieda
Patrick Rembrandt's daughter and Sif's younger sister. Like her sister, she enrolled into Rotsgard academy and became Makoto's student. She is proeficent with physical combat.
She developed a crush on Makoto after he helped cure her of the same curse as Sif.
Jin Rohan (ジン・ロアン, Jin Roan)
Voiced by: Yuuki Shin
A student of Makoto's, he had a childhood friend called Miranda and wishes to meet her again, unaware that she has changed her name to Sofia Bulga.
Abelia Hopleys (アベリア・ホープレイズ, Aberia Hōpureizu)
Voiced by: Yurie Kozakai
A student of Makoto's, she is a member of the Hopleys family skilled with weapons, magic and archery, without specializing in none of it.
Mizra Cazper (ミスラ・カズパー, Mizura Kazupā)
Voiced by: Shinsuke Sugawara
A student of Makoto's who is skilled with the sword. He later begins dating Yuno.
Izumo Ikusabe (イズモ・イクサベ)
Voiced by: Tatsumaru Tachibana (Japanese); Matt Shipman (English)
A student of Makoto's and a mage in training.
Daena Severus (ダエナ・セブルス, Daena Seburusu)
Voiced by: Tomohiro Yamaguchi
A student of Makoto's skilled with close combat and debuff spells. He is already married.
Ilumgand Hopleys (イルムガンド・ホープレイズ, Irumugando Hōpureizu)
Voiced by: Kent Itō
A student at Rotsgard Academy and Luria's childhood friend. He reunites with Ruria in the academy but bemoans her when he learns she left her kingdom to survive and is driven away by Makoto. He later makes a deal with Rona to become stronger but is turned into a monster instead. Defeated by Makoto's students and later killed by Mio.
Eva (エヴァ)
Voiced by: Shiori Izawa
A librarian at Rotsgard Academy who becomes acquainted with Makoto. She is Luria's older sister and a fugitive from the Kingdom of Kaleneon after it was taken by demons. She later joins forces with Makoto who recaptures Kaleneon from the demons and instate both sisters as its new rulers.
Luria (ルリア, Ruria)
Voiced by: Yuuki Hirose
Eva's younger sister who works in a café at Rotsgard. She befriends Makoto and joins her sister in the effort to rebuild Kaleneon after she and her sister are instated as its new rulers with Makoto's help.

=== Demon Army ===
Sofia Bulga (ソフィア・ブルガ, Sofia Buruga)
Voiced by: Miyuki Sawashiro (Japanese); Morgan Garrett (English)
Sofia is a renowned adventurer and was the strongest adventurer registered to the guild, prior to Tomoe and Mio joining. She is very skilled with swords and magic, proving that her level of skill is not just for show. In the first encounter with Makoto due to Goddess' teleportation, Sofia is unable to meaningfully harm Makoto and is later forced to escape his very deadly attack.
Lancer (ランサー, Ransā) / Mitsurugi (御剣, Mitsurugi)
Voiced by: Soma Saito (Japanese); Justin Briner (English)
He is one of the Greater Dragons, who partnered with Sofia to kill the other Greater Dragons while helping the Demons against Goddess. Thinking Makoto was a pawn of the Goddess, Lancer took a lot of damage from blindly fighting him, labeling Makoto the "Devil".

=== Gritonia Empire ===
Tomoki Iwahashi (岩橋智樹, Iwahashi Tomoki)
Voiced by: Ryōhei Arai
Lily Front Gritonia (リリ・フロント・グリトニア, Riri Furonto Gritonia)
Voiced by: Mai Nakahara
Guinevere Shlesha (ギネビア・スレーシャ, Ginebia Surēsha)
Voiced by: Sayumi Watabe
Mora (モーラ, Mōra)
Voiced by: Ami Tsukishiro
Yukinatsu Kazusa (ユキナツ・カズサ)
Voiced by: Natsue Sasamoto

=== Limia Kingdom ===
Hibiki Otonashi (音無響, Otonashi Hibiki)
Voiced by: Ai Kakuma
Navarre Polar (ナバール・ポーラー, Nabāru Pōrā)
Voiced by: Ami Koshimizu
Woody Baila (ウーディ・バイラ, Ūdi Baira)
Voiced by: Yuji Murai
Belda Nortst Limia (ベルダ・ノースト・リミア, Beruda Nōsuto Rimia)
Voiced by: Chiharu Sawashiro
Chiya Hazuki (チヤ・ハヅキ)
Voiced by: Nao Tamura

=== Other characters ===
Patrick Rembrandt (パトリック・レンブラント, Patorikku Renburanto)
Voiced by: Kazuhiko Inoue
The owner of the Rembrandt Company. His wife and children were victims of a curse until Makoto helped resolve the issue. He offers his trust to Makoto; being one of the few that accept his true face, even if he is off-put by it.
Morris (モリス, Morisu)
Voiced by: Masaharu Satō (Japanese); R. Bruce Elliott (English)
Patrick's butler and right-hand man. He is a former adventurer. Morris messed up the paperwork for Makoto getting admitted to the academy; accidentally submitting the teacher application.
Root (ルト, Ruto)
Voiced by: Yoshitsugu Matsuoka
The leader of the greater dragons and founder of the Adventurer's Guild whose power is on par with the Goddess. Root can assume a human form and easily be either gender. He becomes interested in Makoto and intends to become his lover.
Root was the wife of the Adventurer's Guild co-founder; taking her husband's knowledge of RPGs from Earth to set up the ranking system.

== Media ==
=== Light novels ===
The light novel is written by Kei Azumi and illustrated by Mitsuaki Matsumoto. It began serialization online in 2012 on the user-generated novel publishing website Shōsetsuka ni Narō, and it moved to the AlphaPolis website in 2016. It was also later acquired by AlphaPolis, who have published 20 volumes since May 2013. Hanashi Media has licensed the light novel for an English release.

| No. | Original release date | Original ISBN | English release date | English ISBN |
|---|---|---|---|---|
| 1 | May 28, 2013 | 978-4-4341-7953-2 | March 30, 2024 | 978-1-9617-8814-5 |
| 2 | October 3, 2013 | 978-4-4341-8369-0 | July 30, 2024 | 978-1-9617-8818-3 |
| 3 | February 4, 2014 | 978-4-4341-8860-2 | September 29, 2024 | 978-1-9617-8819-0 |
| 4 | June 2, 2014 | 978-4-4341-9324-8 | November 29, 2024 | 978-1-9617-8822-0 |
| 5 | February 10, 2015 | 978-4-4341-9771-0 | January 30, 2025 | 978-1-9617-8823-7 |
| 6 | May 30, 2015 | 978-4-4342-0673-3 | March 30, 2025 | 978-1-9617-8825-1 |
| 7 | September 3, 2015 | 978-4-4342-0960-4 | May 30, 2025 | 978-1-9617-8827-5 |
| 8 | December 12, 2015 | 978-4-4342-1315-1 | July 30, 2025 | 978-1-9617-8829-9 |
| 8.5 | March 28, 2016 | 978-4-4342-1772-2 | September 30, 2025 | 978-1-9617-8833-6 |
| 9 | July 29, 2016 | 978-4-4342-2262-7 | October 30, 2025 | 978-1-9617-8834-3 |
| 10 | November 30, 2016 | 978-4-4342-2683-0 | November 30, 2025 | 978-1-9617-8835-0 |
| 11 | March 31, 2017 | 978-4-4342-3157-5 | December 30, 2025 | 978-1-9617-8841-1 |
| 12 | July 31, 2017 | 978-4-4342-3597-9 | January 30, 2026 | 978-1-9617-8842-8 |
| 13 | November 30, 2017 | 978-4-4342-4023-2 | February 28, 2026 | 978-1-9617-8847-3 |
| 14 | April 5, 2018 | 978-4-4342-4446-9 | March 30, 2026 | 978-1-9617-8855-8 |
| 15 | October 30, 2020 | 978-4-4342-4921-1 | April 30, 2026 | 978-1-9617-8862-6 |
| 16 | June 30, 2021 | 978-4-4342-9005-3 | May 30, 2026 | 978-1-9617-8867-1 |
| 17 | September 30, 2021 | 978-4-4342-9400-6 | June 30, 2026 | 978-1-9617-8870-1 |
| 18 | August 5, 2022 | 978-4-4343-0753-9 | July 30, 2026 | 978-1-9617-8877-0 |
| 19 | December 31, 2023 | 978-4-4343-2314-0 | August 30, 2026 | 978-1-9617-8884-8 |
| 20 | June 30, 2024 | 978-4-4343-4088-8 | September 30, 2026 | 978-1-9617-8888-6 |

=== Manga ===
A manga adaptation, illustrated by Kotora Kino, has been serialized online via AlphaPolis' manga website since June 10, 2015, with its chapters collected in 16 tankōbon volumes as of October 31, 2025. The manga is published digitally in English through Alpha Manga.

| No. | Original release date | Original ISBN | English release date | English ISBN |
|---|---|---|---|---|
| 1 | February 29, 2016 | 978-4-4342-1604-6 | July 28, 2023 | — |
| 2 | October 31, 2016 | 978-4-4342-2470-6 | July 28, 2023 | — |
| 3 | June 30, 2017 | 978-4-4342-3287-9 | July 28, 2023 | — |
| 4 | February 28, 2018 | 978-4-4342-4184-0 | September 29, 2023 | — |
| 5 | October 31, 2018 | 978-4-4342-5105-4 | September 29, 2023 | — |
| 6 | June 30, 2019 | 978-4-4342-5990-6 | September 29, 2023 | — |
| 7 | February 29, 2020 | 978-4-4342-7015-4 | November 30, 2023 | — |
| 8 | October 31, 2020 | 978-4-4342-8011-5 | November 30, 2023 | — |
| 9 | June 30, 2021 | 978-4-4342-9014-5 | November 30, 2023 | — |
| 10 | February 28, 2022 | 978-4-4342-9999-5 | May 31, 2024 | — |
| 11 | October 31, 2022 | 978-4-4343-1025-6 | August 23, 2024 | — |
| 12 | July 31, 2023 | 978-4-4343-2322-5 | April 25, 2025 | — |
| 13 | December 31, 2023 | 978-4-4343-3120-6 | October 24, 2025 | — |
| 14 | June 30, 2024 | 978-4-4343-4087-1 | March 27, 2026 | — |
| 15 | February 28, 2025 | 978-4-4343-5336-9 | August 28, 2026 | — |
| 16 | October 31, 2025 | 978-4-4343-6642-0 | — | — |
| 17 | June 30, 2026 | 978-4-434-37962-8 | — | — |

=== Anime ===
An anime television series adaptation was announced on October 20, 2020. The series is animated by C2C and directed by Shinji Ishihira, with Kenta Ihara handling series' composition, Yukie Suzuki designing the characters, and Yasuharu Takanashi composing the series' music. It aired from July 7 to September 22, 2021, on Tokyo MX and other networks. Crunchyroll streamed the series worldwide excluding Asian territories. Medialink has licensed the series in Southeast Asia and South Asia, and is streaming it on their Ani-One YouTube channel under their Ultra membership scheme. The opening theme, "Gamble", is performed by syudou, while the ending theme, "Beautiful Dreamer", is performed by Ezoshika Gourmet Club. On April 27, 2022, Crunchyroll announced that the series would receive an English dub, which premiered the following day.

After the airing of the final episode, a second season was announced. The two consecutive-cour season was animated by J.C.Staff, with the main staff returning from the first season. It aired from January 8 to June 25, 2024. The first opening theme song is "Utopia", performed by Keina Suda, while the first ending theme is "My Factor", performed by Kent Itō. The second opening theme song is "Reversal", performed by syudou, while the second ending theme song is "Jōshiki Hazure Human" (常識外れヒューマン; "Eccentric Human"), performed by Kaori Maeda.

After the final episode of the second season, a third season was announced.

== Reception ==
The first season of the anime series has the highest overseas sales record among all Nippon TV anime.
