= Jōgi Shiraishi =

Japanese light novelist

- 白石定規
- Born: May 17, 1993 (age 33); Kumamoto Prefecture, Japan
- Occupation: Novelist
- Writing career
- Language: Japanese
- Period: 2014–present
- Genre: Light novel
- Notable work: Wandering Witch: The Journey of Elaina

Jōgi Shiraishi (白石定規, Shiraishi Jōgi; born May 17, 1993) is a Japanese novelist from the Kumamoto Prefecture.

== Career ==
Shiraishi started writing novels from around the second year of junior high school. He stopped writing sometime in senior high school and only resumed after graduating, writing light novels during his entrance to university and completing several only to shelf said works. After entering university, he began writing again and around the time he was 20 years old, he submitted a novel to the GA Bunko Award, making it to the second round before ultimately being rejected. This inspired him to begin focusing on self-publishing his work as e-books.

In 2014, he self-published the first volume of his series, Wandering Witch: The Journey of Elaina, as an Amazon Kindle book. However, he found little initial success. After placing an advertisement for his series in the VIP newsletter on 2channel, his work suddenly became popular and SB Creative, after some heavy revisions, started publishing the series under their GA Novel imprint in April 2016. It received an anime adaption in 2020. A spin-off series centered around the character Riviere has also started publishing under the same label.

In 2023, a new light novel series Nana ga Yarakasu Gobyо̄mae began releasing.

== Writing style and influences ==
In an interview, Shiraishi explained that the reason he chose to write Wandering Witch as a series of separate stories was to make it easy for readers to read, and also wanted to be able to write stories ranging in mood and tone.

He states his influences include novels such as Honobu Yonezawa's Hakanai Hitsujitachi no Shukueni and Koten-bu series, Yuya Sato's 333 no Teppen, Keiichi Sigsawa's Kino's Journey, and Akira's Heian Zankoku Monogatari.

Shiraishi enjoys reading the National Geographic, and sometimes gets ideas from the animal ecology and other information in the magazine.

== Notable works ==
=== Novels ===
- Wandering Witch: The Journey of Elaina (魔女の旅々) (Illustrated by Azure, published by GA Novel, 25 volumes, 2016–present)
  - Riviere and the Land of Prayer (リリエールと祈りの国) (Illustrated by Azure, published by GA Bunko, 2017, ISBN 978-4-7973-9068-1)
  - Riviere and the Land of Prayer (祈りの国のリリエール) (Illustrated by Azure, published by GA Novel, 3 volumes, 2022–present)
- Nana ga Yarakasu Gobyо̄mae (ナナがやらかす五秒前) (Illustrated by 92M, published by GA Novel, 2 volumes, 2023–present)
