= Wandering Witch: The Journey of Elaina =

Japanese light novel series and its franchise

- First light novel volume cover, featuring Elaina

魔女の旅々 (Majo no Tabitabi)
- Genre: Adventure; Fantasy
- Light novel
- Written by: Jōgi Shiraishi
- Illustrated by: Azure
- Published by: SB Creative
- English publisher: NA: Yen Press
- Imprint: GA Novel
- Original run: April 15, 2016 – present
- Volumes: 25
- Manga
- Written by: Jōgi Shiraishi
- Illustrated by: Itsuki Nanao
- Published by: Square Enix
- English publisher: NA: Square Enix
- Magazine: Manga Up!
- Original run: November 29, 2018 – March 28, 2024
- Volumes: 6
- Anime television series
- Directed by: Toshiyuki Kubooka
- Written by: Kazuyuki Fudeyasu
- Music by: AstroNotes
- Studio: C2C
- Licensed by: Crunchyroll (Note: In North America through Crunchyroll, LLC (formerly known as Funimation).); SA/SEA: Muse Communication
- Original network: AT-X, Tokyo MX, KBS, SUN, BS11, TVA
- Original run: October 2, 2020 – December 18, 2020
- Episodes: 12
- Manga

Riviere and the Land of Prayer
- Written by: Jōgi Shiraishi
- Illustrated by: Neriume
- Published by: SB Creative
- English publisher: NA: Yen Press
- Magazine: Piccoma
- Original run: December 17, 2021 – January 26, 2024
- Volumes: 3
- Light novel

Riviere and the Land of Prayer
- Written by: Jōgi Shiraishi
- Illustrated by: Azure
- Published by: SB Creative
- English publisher: NA: Yen Press
- Imprint: GA Novel
- Original run: January 14, 2022 – present
- Volumes: 3
- Anime film
- icon

Wandering Witch: The Journey of Elaina (Japanese: 魔女の旅々, Hepburn: Majo no Tabitabi; lit. 'The Witch's Journey'), or simply Wandering Witch, is a Japanese light novel series written by Jōgi Shiraishi and illustrated by Azure. SB Creative have released twenty-five volumes since April 2016 under their GA Novel label. A manga adaptation with art by Itsuki Nanao was serialized online from November 2018 to March 2024 via Square Enix's online manga magazine Manga Up!. It has been collected in six tankōbon volumes. The light novel is licensed in North America by Yen Press, and the manga is licensed by Square Enix. An anime television series adaptation produced by C2C aired from October to December 2020. A new anime film has been announced.

== Plot ==
Fascinated by the stories of Niké, a witch who traveled around the world, Elaina aspires to take the same course. Her determination of studying books and magic leads to her becoming the youngest apprentice witch to pass the sorcery exam. However, when Elaina attempts to receive training in order to become a full-fledged witch, she is rejected due to her extraordinary talents until she finds Fran, the "Stardust Witch", who accepts her. After earning her title, the "Ashen Witch", Elaina begins her exploration around the world, visiting and facing all kinds of people and places.

== Characters ==
Elaina (イレイナ, Ireina)
Voiced by: Kaede Hondo (Japanese); Amber Lee Connors (English)
Elaina grew up reading stories about the adventures of a witch named Niké, who she does not know is her mother's alias; inspired, she chose to travel the world as well, even being given her mother's old title of "Ashen Witch" upon becoming a full-fledged witch. The story is told through her diary entries.
Fran (フラン, Furan)
Voiced by: Kana Hanazawa (Japanese); Jad Saxton (English)
Known as the "Stardust Witch", she is Elaina's mentor from a distant land. Beneath her laid-back attitude lies an incredibly powerful and knowledgeable witch. The most important thing she taught Elaina was to stand up for herself and not just endure mistreatment in the hope that it will all work out. She, along with Sheila, was an apprentice of Niké. Unlike Sheila, Fran works freelance for whoever needs magical assistance.
Saya (サヤ)
Voiced by: Tomoyo Kurosawa (Japanese); Dani Chambers (English)
An apprentice witch from an eastern land. Relying on others for support, she secretly stole Elaina's witch brooch and then offered her shelter in an attempt to force her to stay with her. However, Elaina eventually figured her out and taught her to have more self-confidence. She later becomes a full-fledged witch, taking the title of "Charcoal Witch" to match Elaina, and starts working under Sheila at the United Magic Association. Saya is in love with Elaina, so she often has trouble parting with her when they meet.
Sheila (シーラ, Shīra)
Voiced by: Yoko Hikasa (Japanese); Leah Clark (English)
Known as the "Night Witch", she is a member of the United Magic Association, which investigates the misuse of magic, as well as Saya and Mina's mentor. She, along with Fran, was a former apprentice of Niké. While Sheila can come across rude, she takes her job quite seriously.
Mina (ミナ)
Voiced by: Minami Takahashi
Saya's younger sister. While she appears stern and aloof, she actually has a sister complex for Saya. She was separated from Saya when she started working under Sheila at the United Magic Association after becoming a full-fledged witch while Saya was still an apprentice. She is jealous of Elaina's closeness to Saya, and grows to resent the former with a passion because of it. To get closer to her sister, she takes the title of "Coal Witch" when she heard of her sister's title to sound similar.

== Production ==
At one point, Jōgi Shiraishi was disappointed at the prospect that he would not become a professional writer. It was around this time when he discovered that it was possible to self-publish books on Amazon's Kindle service. Thanks to this opportunity, the series debuted as an e-book in 2014. Shiraishi professes that in terms of inspiration, he comes across various stories and material from other genres and formats. He also cites National Geographic and the ecology of animals and plants as the inspiration for the various countries and creatures featured in the series. When he thinks about the story, Shiraishi states that he focuses on the setting and world first.

After the anime adaptation was announced, the only major request Shiraishi had for the production staff was for them not to show any panties, in order to broaden the age range of the audience.

== Media ==
=== Light novels ===
The series was acquired by SB Creative, who began publishing it in light novel format through its GA Novel imprint with illustrations by Azure on April 15, 2016. Twenty-five volumes have been released as of March 14, 2026. Yen Press has licensed the series in North America and the first volume was published on January 28, 2020.

A spin-off light novel series titled Riviere and the Land of Prayer began publication on January 14, 2022. Three volumes have been published as of June 15, 2023. During their panel at New York Comic Con 2023, Yen Press announced that they had licensed the spin-off for English publication.

==== Volumes ====
===== Wandering Witch: The Journey of Elaina =====
| No. | Original release date | Original ISBN | English release date | English ISBN |
|---|---|---|---|---|
| 1 | April 15, 2016 | 978-4-7973-8435-2 | January 28, 2020 | 978-1-9753-3295-2 |
| 2 | July 15, 2016 | 978-4-7973-8816-9 | June 23, 2020 | 978-1-9753-0956-5 |
| 3 | December 15, 2016 | 978-4-7973-8924-1 | November 10, 2020 | 978-1-9753-0958-9 |
| 4 | July 15, 2017 | 978-4-7973-9286-9 | January 19, 2021 | 978-1-9753-0961-9 |
| 5 | November 15, 2017 | 978-4-7973-9399-6 | May 25, 2021 | 978-1-9753-0962-6 |
| 6 | March 15, 2018 | 978-4-7973-9565-5 | October 5, 2021 | 978-1-9753-0964-0 |
| 7 | July 14, 2018 | 978-4-7973-9613-3 | March 15, 2022 | 978-1-9753-0966-4 |
| 8 | November 15, 2018 | 978-4-7973-9715-4; 978-4-7973-9612-6 (SE) | May 17, 2022 | 978-1-9753-0968-8 |
| 9 | April 15, 2019 | 978-4-8156-0099-0 | October 4, 2022 | 978-1-9753-0970-1 |
| 10 | August 9, 2019 | 978-4-8156-0170-6; 978-4-8156-0171-3 (SE) | March 21, 2023 | 978-1-9753-3463-5 |
| 11 | November 14, 2019 | 978-4-8156-0374-8 | July 18, 2023 | 978-1-9753-3467-3 |
| 12 | April 14, 2020 | 978-4-8156-0377-9; 978-4-8156-0376-2 (SE) | November 21, 2023 | 978-1-9753-6865-4 |
| 13 | July 14, 2020 | 978-4-8156-0486-8; 978-4-8156-0485-1 (SE) | April 16, 2024 | 978-1-9753-6867-8 |
| 14 | October 14, 2020 | 978-4-8156-0488-2; 978-4-8156-0487-5 (SE) | September 17, 2024 | 978-1-9753-6869-2 |
| 15 | December 10, 2020 | 978-4-8156-0797-5 | March 18, 2025 | 978-1-9753-6871-5 |
| 16 | March 12, 2021 | 978-4-8156-0829-3; 978-4-8156-0828-6 (SE) | December 9, 2025 | 978-1-9753-6873-9 |
| 17 | July 14, 2021 | 978-4-8156-0831-6; 978-4-8156-0830-9 (SE) | August 11, 2026 | 978-1-9753-6875-3 |
| 18 | January 14, 2022 | 978-4-8156-1027-2; 978-4-8156-1368-6 (SE) | February 9, 2027 | 978-1-9753-6877-7 |
| 19 | September 14, 2022 | 978-4-8156-1543-7; 978-4-8156-1542-0 (SE) | — | — |
| 20 | March 15, 2023 | 978-4-8156-1704-2; 978-4-8156-1703-5 (SE) | — | — |
| 21 | October 14, 2023 | 978-4-8156-1972-5; 978-4-8156-1971-8 (SE) | — | — |
| 22 | March 15, 2024 | 978-4-8156-1973-2; 978-4-8156-2487-3 (SE) | — | — |
| 23 | October 13, 2024 | 978-4-8156-2576-4; 978-4-8156-2597-9 (SE) | — | — |
| 24 | March 15, 2025 | 978-4-8156-2579-5; 978-4-8156-3112-3 (SE) | — | — |
| 25 | March 14, 2026 | 978-4-8156-3740-8; 978-4-8156-3739-2 (SE) | — | — |

===== Riviere and the Land of Prayer =====
| No. | Original release date | Original ISBN | English release date | English ISBN |
|---|---|---|---|---|
| 1 | January 14, 2022 | 978-4-8156-1068-5 | April 23, 2024 | 978-1-9753-7978-0 |
| 2 | June 14, 2022 | 978-4-8156-1554-3 | August 20, 2024 | 978-1-9753-7980-3 |
| 3 | June 15, 2023 | 978-4-8156-1899-5 | December 10, 2024 | 979-8-8554-0061-8 |

=== Manga ===
A manga adaptation by Itsuki Nanao was serialized on Square Enix's smartphone app and website Manga Up! from November 29, 2018, to March 28, 2024. Square Enix collected its chapters in six tankōbon volumes, released from April 12, 2019, to July 5, 2024. The manga is published in English by Square Enix.

A manga adaptation of the spin-off light novel Riviere and the Land of Prayer was serialized on the Piccoma website under SB Creative's GA Comic brand from December 17, 2021, to January 26, 2024. The manga's chapters have been collected into three tankōbon volumes as of March 2024. The manga is also licensed in English by Yen Press.

==== Volumes ====
===== Wandering Witch: The Journey of Elaina =====
| No. | Original release date | Original ISBN | English release date | English ISBN |
|---|---|---|---|---|
| 1 | April 12, 2019 | 978-4-7575-6093-2 | May 12, 2020 (digital); July 14, 2020 (print) | 978-1-64609-035-8 |
| 2 | December 25, 2019 | 978-4-7575-6429-9 | December 8, 2020 | 978-1-64609-036-5 |
| 3 | December 7, 2020 | 978-4-7575-6991-1 | November 16, 2021 | 978-1-64609-129-4 |
| 4 | March 7, 2022 | 978-4-7575-7776-3 | June 20, 2023 | 978-1-64609-199-7 |
| 5 | March 7, 2023 | 978-4-7575-8452-5 | May 28, 2024 | 978-1-64609-266-6 |
| 6 | July 5, 2024 | 978-4-7575-9291-9 | August 19, 2025 | 978-1-64609-396-0 |

===== Riviere and the Land of Prayer =====
| No. | Original release date | Original ISBN | English release date | English ISBN |
|---|---|---|---|---|
| 1 | August 11, 2022 | 978-4-8156-1053-1 | August 27, 2024 | 978-1-9753-7982-7 |
| 2 | July 13, 2023 | 978-4-8156-1311-2 | February 18, 2025 | 979-8-8554-0063-2 |
| 3 | March 15, 2024 | 978-4-8156-1885-8 | June 24, 2025 | 979-8-8554-1333-5 |

=== Anime ===
An anime television series adaptation was announced during a livestream for the "GA Fes 2019" event on October 19, 2019. The series was animated by C2C and directed by Toshiyuki Kubooka, with Kazuyuki Fudeyasu handling series composition, and Takeshi Oda adapting Azure's character designs. AstroNotes composed the soundtrack for the anime, which was later released in an album on January 27, 2021. The series aired for 12 episodes from October 2 to December 18, 2020, on AT-X and other channels. The opening theme is "Literature" (リテラチュア, Riterachua) performed by Reina Ueda, while the ending theme is "Haiiro no Saga" (灰色のサーガ; 'Gray Saga') performed by ChouCho.

Funimation acquired the series and streamed it on its website in North America and the British Isles. AnimeLab simulcasted the series in Australia and New Zealand. Wakanim streamed the series in select European territories. On December 3, 2020, Funimation announced that the series would receive an English dub, which premiered the following day. Following Sony's acquisition of Crunchyroll, the series was moved to Crunchyroll. Muse Communication has licensed the series in Southeast Asia and South Asia and they streamed it on their Muse Asia YouTube channel.

A new anime film was announced during the "GA Fes 2026: GA 20th Anniversary" livestream event on January 4, 2026.

==== Episodes ====
| No. | Title (Note: All English titles are taken from Funimation.) | Directed by | Written by | Original release date |
|---|---|---|---|---|
| 1 | "Elaina, the Apprentice Witch"; Transliteration: "Majo Minarai Ireina" (Japanese: 魔女見習いイレイナ) | Ayumu Uwano | Kazuyuki Fudeyasu | October 2, 2020 |
When she was a young girl, Elaina wanted to travel around the world. As such, she decided to study so she could become a witch. When she turns 14 years old, Elaina passes the sorcery exam, becoming an apprentice witch. She then approaches the witches in the country in order to be their disciple, but she is rejected. Afterward, Elaina overhears her parents talk about the "Stardust Witch" who lives in the forest. Heading there, she meets the Stardust Witch, who is named Fran. She is surprised when Fran agrees to train her. However, for a month, all Elaina does is chores. When Fran gives Elaina a test, she overwhelms her, which causes Elaina to become despondent. Fran then reveals that her parents asked her to teach her about failure and setback. She decides to train Elaina for real. A year later, Elaina becomes a full-fledged witch. After an emotional sendoff, Elaina leaves her home. It is then revealed that Elaina has been traveling for three years.
| 2 | "The Land of Mages"; Transliteration: "Mahōtsukai no Kuni" (Japanese: 魔法使いの国) | Hiroshi Kimura | Kazuyuki Fudeyasu | October 9, 2020 |
Elaina arrives at the Land of Mages. While she is flying around, another mage runs into her. After Elaina helps the mage, she heads off to find a place to stay. However, she is kicked out of every hotel she visits. When she heads to one more place, which is a run-down inn, Elaina meets the same mage she previously encountered named Saya. She notices her brooch is missing. Later at night, Saya reveals her younger sister passed the sorcery exam, and she asks Elaina to train her. Elaina agrees to help Saya until she finds her brooch. A few days later, while she is out looking for her brooch in the area where Saya ran into her, Elaina has a conversation with one of the residents and discovers what has happened. In the evening, Elaina asks Saya to return her brooch. When Saya admits she took it because she was lonely, Elaina gives Saya her spare hat so she will not feel alone. Six months later, Elaina reads an article stating Saya has become an apprentice witch. Elaina looks forward to meeting Saya again when she becomes a full-fledged witch.
| 3 | "The Girl as Pretty as a Flower"; Transliteration: "Hana no Yō ni Karen'na Kanojo" (Japanese: 花のように可憐な彼女) | Jun Takahashi | Kazuyuki Fudeyasu | October 16, 2020 |
| 3 | "Bottled Happiness"; Transliteration: "Bindzume no Shiawase" (Japanese: 瓶詰めの幸せ) | Jun Takahashi | Kazuyuki Fudeyasu | October 16, 2020 |
While flying over a flower field, Elaina meets a girl who gives her a bouquet. Upon entering the next kingdom, however, she is stopped by a guard who recognizes it as coming from his missing sister. Another guard shows up and states the bouquet is actually magical flowers. The next day, Elaina returns to the girl only to find she turned into a plant. She notices the girl's brother is in the process of becoming one as well. Seeing there is nothing she can do, Elaina flies away. Elaina encounters a mage named Emil, who has been collecting happiness as a present for a girl he has a crush on named Nino. Inviting Elaina into his home, it is revealed Nino is actually the family's depressed and abused slave. Emil later gives Nino his present. However, unbeknownst to him, seeing others' happiness only makes her more depressed. Afterward, Elaina departs; she never saw Nino again.
| 4 | "The Princess Without Subjects"; Transliteration: "Min Naki Kuni no Ōjo" (Japanese: 民なき国の王女) | Takeshi Nishino | Kazuyuki Fudeyasu | October 23, 2020 |
Elaina arrives at the ruins of a kingdom abandoned by all but its amnesiac princess, Mirarosé, who reveals every night, the kingdom is terrorized by a monster known as Javalier and the castle is the only safe haven. Having discovered that Elaina is a witch, Mirarosé intends to battle Javalier and Elaina agrees to help prepare after being allowed to stay at the castle. During the battle, Elaina stakes out in case Mirarosé needs help. However, having regained her memories, Mirarosé easily defeats Javalier. Elaina later recalls the story of forbidden love between a princess and a cook. Mirarosé reveals she was the princess and her father, the king, had her boyfriend executed, prompting her to take revenge by turning him into the monster before erasing her own memories. Afterward, Elaina leaves as Mirarosé begins spiraling into eternal madness, imagining herself having breakfast with her deceased boyfriend and child; her actions have made her known as "The Princess Without Subjects".
| 5 | "Royal Celesteria"; Transliteration: "Ōritsu Seresuteria" (Japanese: 王立セレステリア) | Ayumu Uwano | Kazuyuki Fudeyasu | October 30, 2020 |
Elaina is walking around when she comes across a book about her mentor Fran. She then reminisces when she visited the country of Royal Celesteria six months prior. In Royal Celesteria, Elaina noticed some mages performing tricks for the crowd. When she arrived at the Royal Magic Academy, she was told no one was allowed to enter without permission. Later, while Elaina was flying around, several students from the academy attempted to catch her without success. Fran then showed up where she and Elaina reunited for the first time in a few years. At the academy, Fran revealed why she was teaching there. She also revealed she wrote a novel during her travels, but she lost track of it. The next day, Elaina served as a special guest lecturer. Afterward, Fran and Elaina had a conversation where Fran told Elaina to meet her at the city gates. The next morning, when Elaina tried to leave without waiting, Fran and the students arrived to say goodbye. Back in the present, Elaina notices how popular Fran is.
| 6 | "The Land of Truth Tellers"; Transliteration: "Shōjiki Mono no Kuni" (Japanese: 正直者の国) | Satoshi Saga | Kazuyuki Fudeyasu | November 6, 2020 |
Elaina arrives in "The Land of Truth Tellers", a country surrounded by a magical barrier that makes lying impossible. However, she soon finds being unable to lie has caused the inhabitants to resort to other methods of deceiving others. After checking out the country for a while, Elaina is reunited with Saya, a now full-fledged witch who has been sent to investigate the country. They are approached by the country's mute former royal witch, Eihemia, who explains the situation: the king hated how his subjects would lie to him and ordered her to cast the barrier using the royal sword as a medium, losing her voice in the process. To restore the country back to normal, the trio sneak into the castle and, after a short scuffle, destroy the sword, restoring everyone's ability to lie along with Eihemia's voice. Afterward, Eihemia convinces the king of the error of his ways while Saya gives Elaina a necklace before they part ways.
| 7 | "The Wall Etched by Travelers"; Transliteration: "Tabibito ga Kizamu Kabe" (Japanese: 旅人が刻む壁) | Jun Takahashi | Kazuyuki Fudeyasu | November 13, 2020 |
| 7 | "The Grape-Stomping Girl"; Transliteration: "Budō Fumi no Shōjo" (Japanese: ぶどう踏みの少女) | Jun Takahashi | Kazuyuki Fudeyasu | November 13, 2020 |
When she was young, Elaina read a story about how Niké convinced the officials of a divided country to allow travelers to carve into the wall. In the present, Saya is in the country and she convinces the officials to allows the people in the country to carve into it as well. When Elaina arrives in the country, she discovers the wall was torn down. She then picks out a piece of the wall that partially has Saya's message on it. In a village, an old man tells his grandchild the story of how the Grape-Throwing Festival started. He reveals the village was divided when a witch showed up. The village chief asked the witch to help stomp grapes. She was reluctant to do so until she was insulted by Rosemary, a famous poster girl. Later, the chief and the witch found out Rosemary was not the one who actually stomped the grapes. While the villagers were arguing, the witch drunkenly threw grapes at everyone. This eventually led to the festival's origin. Back in the present, it is revealed the chief and Rosemary are married.
| 8 | "The Ripper"; Transliteration: "Kirisaki Ma" (Japanese: 切り裂き魔) | Ayumu Uwano | Kazuyuki Fudeyasu | November 20, 2020 |
Elaina arrives in a country where dolls are very popular. While she is taking a break, Elaina overhears another witch asking the townspeople if they have seen the Ripper. Just as she is about to leave, Elaina is approached by the witch, who introduces herself as Sheila. Once she explains the situation, Shelia asks Elaina to let her know if she finds out anything. As she is walking around, Elaina comes across a doll shop. After turning down a request to take a free doll, she heads to an inn. The next morning, Elaina discovers her hair has been cut. During their investigation, Elaina and Sheila learn of a secret auction, which they head to later in the day. When they see the doll which has Elaina's hair, Elaina damages it, causing the doll shopkeeper to reveal herself. When she admits she is the Ripper, she is apprehended by Sheila and Elaina. Once they go their separate ways, it is revealed Shelia is Saya's mentor. When Saya learns what happened, she angrily confronts the shopkeeper.
| 9 | "A Deep Sorrow from the Past"; Transliteration: "Sakanoboru Nageki" (Japanese: 遡る嘆き) | Hiroki Itai | Kazuyuki Fudeyasu | November 27, 2020 |
Finding herself out of money in the town of Rostolf, Elaina takes a job from a fellow witch named Estelle, who tells her about a friend named Selena who lost her parents and was taken in by an abusive uncle. Once she went insane and murdered him, Estelle was forced to execute her. Estelle wants Elaina's help in a time travel spell to go back in time and prevent the deaths of Selena's parents. Elaina accepts and the two successfully travel to the past. However, after meeting Selena and her parents, they are attacked by the killer, who is none other than Selena herself. She reveals her parents abused her as well and she never saw Estelle as a friend, prompting the latter to kill her. After returning to the present, it is revealed Estelle gave up her memories of Selena to boost her magic, leaving Elaina to despair about the situation.
| 10 | "The Two Teachers"; Transliteration: "Futari no Shishō" (Japanese: 二人の師匠) | Hiroki Ikeshita | Kazuyuki Fudeyasu | December 4, 2020 |
After ordering Saya to deliver a box to the United Magic Association branch in the town of Qunorts, Sheila prepares to go on an annual vacation with Fran. On their way, the two recall their youth as fellow apprentices of Niké. They frequently clashed until their master tasked them with apprehending the Curio Company, a band of robbers that terrorized Qunorts. Unfortunately, their continued clashing only caused them to get in each others' way and they ended up getting captured. Ultimately, the two put their differences aside and worked together to defeat the Curio Company. Afterward, they became full-fledged witches. Back in the present, Sheila recognizes the box as having belonged to the Curio Company and she rushes after Saya. Meanwhile, Elaina arrives in Qunorts.
| 11 | "The Two Apprentices"; Transliteration: "Futari no Deshi" (Japanese: 二人の弟子) | Takeshi Nishino | Kazuyuki Fudeyasu | December 11, 2020 |
Elaina is in Qunorts where she reads an article stating that the Curio Company is free after 20 years. Meanwhile, Saya arrives in the town where she encounters the leader, who unsuccessfully tries to steal the box. She then meets up with her younger sister, Mina, who is working undercover. The leader later finds Elaina and she uses a spell that causes Elaina and Saya to switch bodies. While inside Saya's body, Elaina opens the box, which releases a love potion that spreads throughout the town. After they find each other, Elaina and Saya apprehend members of the Curio Company in order to find the location of the leader. Once they confront her, she brags that there are more members in town that they have not captured. Just then, Fran and Sheila arrive to help restore order. The next day, Elaina and Saya are back in their bodies. When Sheila, Saya, and Mina leave town, Elaina and Fran have a conversation before they go their separate ways. Elaina then decides to continue on her journey.
| 12 | "The Everyday Tale of Every Ashen Witch"; Transliteration: "Aritoarayuru Arifureta Hai no Majo no Monogatari" (Japanese: ありとあらゆるありふれた灰の魔女の物語) | Toshiyuki Kubooka | Kazuyuki Fudeyasu | December 18, 2020 |
Elaina arrives in a country that claims it make wishes come true. Once she heads inside, she notices that the locations are places she previously visited. When Elaina goes to Mirarosé's castle, she learns there are many versions of herself. At a meeting, it is revealed that one of the Elainas has been attacking everyone. Shortly thereafter, the violent Elaina shows up. When the real Elaina wonders why the violent Elaina is doing this, she admits that she wants everyone to experience the same pain she feels as she never got over what happened in Rostolf. Following an exhausting battle, the real Elaina makes peace with the violent Elaina. When they return to the castle, the Elainas decide to turn their diaries into a book titled Wandering Witch. Afterward, Elaina is in another country when she bumps into a girl named Amnesia and they accidentally switch their books in the process. Elaina reveals that she and Amnesia will travel together in the future.

== Reception ==
The light novel series ranked ninth in 2018 in Takarajimasha's annual light novel guide book Kono Light Novel ga Sugoi!, in the tankōbon category. It ranked sixth in 2019; and sixth again in 2020.
