= Oneechan ga Kita =

Japanese manga series

- Onee-chan ga Kita
- Cover of Oneechan ga Kita volume 1 by Takeshobo featuring Tomoya Mizuhara (left) and Ichika Mizuhara (right)

お姉ちゃんが来た
- Genre: Comedy
- Manga
- Written by: Rikō Anzai
- Published by: Takeshobo
- Magazine: Manga Life
- Original run: July 2011 – June 2020
- Volumes: 15
- Anime television series
- Directed by: Yoshihide Yuuzumi
- Music by: Fūga Hatori
- Studio: C2C
- Original network: Tokyo MX, AT-X, KBS
- Original run: January 8, 2014 – March 26, 2014
- Episodes: 12 (+1 OVA episode)

Oneechan ga Kita (お姉ちゃんが来た; lit. 'My Big Sister Arrived') is a Japanese four-panel comedy manga series by Rikō Anzai, was serialized in Takeshobo's seinen manga magazine Manga Life as well as sister magazine Manga Life Momo from July 2011 to June 2020. It has been collected in 15 tankōbon volumes. A 12-episode anime television series adaptation by C2C aired between January 8, 2014, and March 26, 2014, and was simulcast by Crunchyroll. A thirteenth OVA episode was included in the first Blu-ray volume released on March 22, 2014.

== Premise ==
Fourteen-year-old Tomoya Mizuhara becomes the stepbrother of seventeen-year-old Ichika when their parents got remarried. Funny moments begin as Ichika tries to gain Tomoya's affection.

== Characters ==
Tomoya Mizuhara (水原 朋也, Mizuhara Tomoya)
Voiced by: Aimi Terakawa
Tomoya Mizuhara is a fourteen-year-old boy and the story's main protagonist. Despite being reserved and well-mannered, he is annoyed at Ichika's regular attempt to enter his room and act lovingly towards him. Tomoya likes Ichika's friends and has a crush on Mina Fujisaki, but is oblivious to the latter's mean spirit.
Ichika Mizuhara (水原 一香, Mizuhara Ichika)
Voiced by: Juri Nagatsuma
Ichika Mizuhara is the seventeen-year-old titular stepsister in the series. Outspoken and passionate, she immediately falls in love with Tomoya and is over-protective of him. Ichika sometimes acts like a stalker and is jealous of any girls that showed affection to Tomoya.
Mina Fujisaki (藤咲 美奈, Fujisaki Mina)
Voiced by: Ibuki Kido
Mina is Tomoya's classmate who acts cute and sweet on the outside, but secretly a narcissist with a mean streak. She considers Ichika to be a rival when the latter drawn all the guys' attentions away from her. Tomoya treats her kindly even if she yells at him. Mina almost confesses to Kōki when she received a White Day gift from him.
Ruri Hayasaka (早坂 ルリ, Hayasaka Ruri)
Voiced by: Omi Minami
Nicknamed "Ruri-Ruri", Ruri Hayasaka is Ichika's friend who shared her opinion about Tomoya's adorable attractiveness, but does not treat her brother well.
Marina Mochizuki (望月 マリナ, Mochizuki Marina)
Voiced by: Marina Inoue
Nicknamed "Marinatchi-san", Marina is Ichika's well-endowed friend with blonde hair. She often plays the straight man role in the series. Many of the boys are attracted to her bust.
Mitsuru Hanazono (花園 美鶴, Hanazono Mitsuru)
Voiced by: Yū Kobayashi
Mitsuru is Tomoya's classmate with a mind always in the gutter. Although Mitsuru is envious of Tomoya for being surrounded by pretty ladies, he still defends Tomoya when Kōki harasses him. He prefers Ichika and her girlfriends as opposed to those in his class.
Kōki Hayasaka (早坂 孝喜, Hayasaka Kōki)
Voiced by: Misuzu Togashi
Kōki Hayasaka is Tomoya's uptight classmate who often got admired for his academic ability. He is later revealed to be Ruri's little brother and has a secret crush on her despite her harsh treatment towards him.
Sōichirō Fuji (藤 総一郎, Fuji Sōichirō)
Voiced by: Kōji Takahashi
Sōichirō Fuji is Marina's half-brother. He is a half-Russian boy with blonde hair, but speaks English and Japanese. Sōichirō is revealed to be an otaku when he found Ichika resembling an idol character he liked.
Yūko Mizuhara (水原 夕子, Mizuhara Yūko)
Voiced by: Fumi Morisawa
Yūko is Tomoya's stepmother.
Masaya Mizuhara (水原 正也, Mizuhara Masaya)
Voiced by: Kenji Hamada
Masaya is Tomoya's father who became the husband of Ichika's mother.

== Media ==
=== Manga ===
| No. | Release date | ISBN |
|---|---|---|
| 1 | June 27, 2012 | 978-4-8124-7905-6 |
| 2 | February 27, 2013 | 978-4-8124-8109-7 |
| 3 | January 17, 2014 | 978-4-8124-8495-1 |
| 4 | March 17, 2014 | 978-4-8124-8535-4 |
| 5 | February 27, 2015 | 978-4-8019-5097-9 |
| 6 | July 17, 2015 | 978-4-8019-5303-1 |
| 7 | May 27, 2016 | 978-4-8019-5534-9 |
| 8 | November 17, 2016 | 978-4-8019-5682-7 |
| 9 | July 27, 2017 | 978-4-8019-6003-9 |
| 10 | December 16, 2017 | 978-4-8019-6137-1 |
| 11 | June 27, 2018 | 978-4-8019-6295-8 |
| 12 | December 27, 2018 | 978-4-8019-6480-8 |
| 13 | June 27, 2019 | 978-4-8019-6661-1 |
| 14 | December 17, 2019 | 978-4-8019-6830-1 |
| 15 | July 28, 2020 | 978-4-8019-7024-3 |

=== Anime ===
The official website of Manga Life announced on December 10, 2013, the anime adaptation of Oneechan ga Kita. Produced by C2C, the three-minute-long anime series is directed by Yoshihide Yuuzumi and the characters are designed by Takeshi Oda. The first promotional video was released on December 16, 2013, which revealed the main cast and staff. Crunchyroll began to simulcast the series when it premiered in Japan on January 8, 2014. The thirteenth episode was bundled with the Blu-ray release on March 22, 2014.

The ending theme song, "Piece", composed by Fūga Hatori and performed by Misuzu Togashi.

| No. | Title (Note: All episode titles are taken from Oneechan ga Kita (TV) encyclopedia on Anime News Network.) | Original release date |
|---|---|---|
| 1 | "She Came! She Came!"; Transliteration: "Kita! Kita!" (Japanese: キター!キター!) | January 8, 2014 |
Tomoya Mizuhara struggles to keep his stepsister named Ichika Mizuhara out of his room.
| 2 | "She Came to School!"; Transliteration: "Gakkō ni Kitā!" (Japanese: 学校にキター!) | January 15, 2014 |
Ichika follows Tomoya on his way to school to deliver his lunch and meets his classmate whom he had a crush named Mina Fujisaki.
| 3 | "Big Sisters Came!"; Transliteration: "Oneechanzu ga Kitā!" (Japanese: お姉ちゃんズがキター!) | January 22, 2014 |
Ichika brings her classmates named Ruri Hayasaka and Marina Mochizuki to her house and introduces them to Tomoya.
| 4 | "Kōki the Tough Guy Came!"; Transliteration: "Kōhana Takayoshi ga Kitā!" (Japanese: コウ派な孝喜がキター!) | January 29, 2014 |
Tomoya and his best friend named Mitsuru Hanazono have a scuffle with Kōki Hayasaka, causing Ichika and Ruri to head to their school to stop them.
| 5 | "Swimsuit Time Came!"; Transliteration: "Mizugi, Kitā!" (Japanese: 水着、キター!) | February 5, 2014 |
Tomoya and Ichika visit a public swimming pool along with their friends.
| 6 | "A Hot Guy Came!"; Transliteration: "Ikemen, Kitā!" (Japanese: イケメン、キター!) | February 12, 2014 |
Tomoya and Ichika meet Marina's brother named Sōichirō Fuji, who pestered Ichika for resembling a gal game character he liked.
| 7 | "Christmas Came!"; Transliteration: "Kurisumasu, Kitā!" (Japanese: クリスマス、キター!) | February 19, 2014 |
Ichika receives a Christmas present from Tomoya.
| 8 | "New Year's Day Came!"; Transliteration: "Shōgatsu, Kitā!" (Japanese: 正月、キター!) | February 26, 2014 |
Tomoya and Ichika celebrate New Year by visiting a Shinto shrine along with their friends.
| 9 | "Valentine's Day is Coming!"; Transliteration: "Barentain, Kurū!" (Japanese: バレンタイン、クルー!) | March 5, 2014 |
Ichika visits Ruri's house to make a homemade chocolate for Tomoya.
| 10 | "Valentine's Day Came!"; Transliteration: "Barentain, Kitā!" (Japanese: バレンタイン、キター!) | March 12, 2014 |
Tomoya, Mitsuru, and Kōki receive chocolate presents from Mina.
| 11 | "White Day Came!"; Transliteration: "Howaito Dē, Kitā!" (Japanese: ホワイトデー、キター!) | March 19, 2014 |
Tomoya gives Ichika a gift on White Day. In school, Mina receives White Day presents from Tomoya and his friends.
| 12 | "My Bedside Nurse Came!"; Transliteration: "Kanbyō, Kitā!" (Japanese: 看病、キター!) | March 26, 2014 |
Ichika takes care of a sick Tomoya and calls her friends for help.
| OVA | "For the First Time... She Came!"; Transliteration: "Hajimete no... Kitā!" (Japanese: 初めての。。。キター!) | March 22, 2014 |
Eight-year-old Ichika meets a lost boy at the playground. Years later, the boy turns out to be her future stepbrother, Tomoya, when her mother announced her remarriage to his father.
