= Project 575 =

Multimedia project created by Sega

- Cover of the Uta Kumi 575 game
- Genre: Comedy, slice of life
- Video game

Uta Kumi 575
- Developer: Sega
- Publisher: Sega
- Directed by: Takumi Yoshinaga
- Produced by: Kenjiro Morimoto
- Designed by: Takeshi Endo; Junpei Ootsu
- Music by: Naofumi Hataya
- Released: January 23, 2014
- Anime television series

Go! Go! 575
- Directed by: Takebumi Anzai
- Written by: Keigo Koyanagi
- Music by: Naoki Chiba
- Studio: Lay-duce, C2C
- Original network: Tokyo MX, tvk
- Original run: January 9, 2014 – January 30, 2014
- Episodes: 4 + 1 special

Project 575 (プロジェクト575, Purojekuto Go-Shichi-Go) is a multimedia project created by Sega that utilizes Vocaloid voice synthesizers in order to create traditional 5-7-5 tanka and haiku poems. It consists of an iPhone app titled Uta Yomi 575 (うた詠み575; lit. 'Song Reader 575'), released on July 26, 2013, as well as a PlayStation Vita game titled Uta Kumi 575 (うた組み575; lit. 'Song Builder 575'), released on January 23, 2014, and is described as a combination of a rhythm game and a word building game. A 4-episode comedy slice of life anime television series adaptation titled Go! Go! 575 aired between January 9 and January 30, 2014.

== Characters ==
Azuki Masaoka (正岡 小豆, Masaoka Azuki)
Voiced by: Yuka Ōtsubo
Matcha Kobayashi (小林 抹茶, Kobayashi Matcha)
Voiced by: Ayaka Ōhashi
Yuzu Yosano (与謝野 柚子, Yosano Yuzu)
Voiced by: Minako Kotobuki
Koume Ono (小野 小梅, Ono Koume)
Voiced by: Yu Serizawa

== Reception ==
Famitsu gave the game an overall rating of 29/40. PlayStation LifeStyle's review praised the main characters, songs, and core gameplay, awarding it a 7/10.
