= World Break: Aria of Curse for a Holy Swordsman =

Japanese light novel series

- First light novel volume cover

聖剣使いの禁呪詠唱 (Seiken Tsukai no Wārudo Bureiku)
- Genre: Action; Fantasy; Harem
- Light novel
- Written by: Akamitsu Awamura
- Illustrated by: Refeia
- Published by: SB Creative
- Imprint: GA Bunko
- Original run: November 15, 2012 – June 14, 2018
- Volumes: 22
- Manga
- Published by: Kadokawa Shoten
- Magazine: Comp Ace
- Original run: June 2014 – February 2016
- Volumes: 4
- Anime television series
- Directed by: Takayuki Inagaki
- Produced by: Atsunori Yoshida
- Written by: Hiroshi Yamaguchi
- Music by: Go Sakabe
- Studio: Diomedéa
- Licensed by: AUS: Madman Entertainment; NA: Funimation
- Original network: TV Tokyo, TVO, TVA, AT-X
- Original run: January 11, 2015 – March 29, 2015
- Episodes: 12
- icon

World Break: Aria of Curse for a Holy Swordsman (Japanese: 聖剣使いの禁呪詠唱(ワールドブレイク), Hepburn: Seiken Tsukai no Wārudo Bureiku; lit. 'Holy Swordsman's World Break') is a Japanese light novel series written by Akamitsu Awamura and illustrated by Refeia. SB Creative has published twenty-two volumes from November 2012 to June 2018 under their GA Bunko imprint. A 12-episode anime television series adaptation by Diomedéa aired between January 11 and March 29, 2015. A manga adaptation was serialized in Kadokawa Shoten's seinen manga magazine Comp Ace from June 2014 to February 2016 and was collected into four volumes. A game adaptation by the Japanese company ASOBIMO has also been released.

== Plot ==
World Break: Aria of Curse for a Holy Swordsman takes place at a school named Akane Academy, where students with special powers and known as Saviors are trained to defend against monsters called Metaphysicals, which brutally and indiscriminately attack humans. Saviors, divided into Shirogane (White Iron) and Kuroma (Black Magic), are the reincarnations of talented individuals who possess awakened memories of their past lives. Shirogane manifest weapons and martial techniques while Kuroma manifest magic for defense purposes.

The story follows main protagonist, Moroha Haimura, who is unique in that he has awakened memories of two past lives: Flaga, a swordmaster and prince of a small country, and Shu Saura, a magician and King of the Netherworld. This gives Moroha the abilities of both a Shirogane and Kuroma. At the academy he meets Satsuki, a boisterous girl who is very boastful and brash and who was Sarasha, Flaga's sister, in her past life; and Shizuno, a calm and levelheaded girl, who was Shu Saura's wife. With his unique abilities he joins the Striker Unit, Akane Academy's team of elite Saviors.

Moroha's plans for a peaceful school life go up in flames when Satsuki and Shizuno begin to vie for his attention and matters only get worse when Metaphysicals start appearing.

== Characters ==
=== Main characters ===
Moroha Haimura (灰村 諸葉, Haimura Moroha)
Voiced by: Kaito Ishikawa (Japanese); Clifford Chapin (English)
A dependable yet easily embarrassed individual, Moroha lives with the inherited memories of two past lives: the Shirogane named Flaga and the Kuroma named Shu Saura. This dual legacy makes him both a Shirogane and a Kuroma, collectively known as an Ancient Dragon. He wields the straight katana Saratiga, which he augments with the dark art Black Gehenna to form the Yin Yang Kurikara. His other abilities include the water-manipulating Ouroboros and the prana-enhancing Gorikitsu. An immensely powerful Metaphysical known as the Ancient Dragon curses Moroha, having hunted his and his companions' previous incarnations across lifetimes.
Satsuki Ranjō (嵐城 サツキ, Ranjō Satsuki)
Voiced by: Ayana Taketatsu (Japanese); Felecia Angelle (English)
A boisterous and often boastful classmate of Moroha and Shizuno, Satsuki is a Shirogane and a princess in her previous incarnation as Sarasha. She is determined to renew her past bond with Moroha. Frequent moves to evade Metaphysicals made forming friendships difficult, a situation compounded by her generally condescending demeanor. Despite this, she readily assists others and skillfully prepares Moroha's meals. As a Savior, she wields the materialized short sword "Acieal", can detect Metaphysicals, and eventually manifests the protective armor Kongoutsu. In her past life, Sarasha was killed by an ancient dragon.
Shizuno Urushibara (漆原 静乃, Urushibara Shizuno)
Voiced by: Aoi Yūki (Japanese); Jad Saxton (English)
Shizuno is calm and levelheaded girl who is classmates with Moroha and Satsuki. She is a Kuroma whose previous incarnation was the Witch of the Netherworld, and she uses dark arts by chanting spells and channeling them through her staff. Her dark arts seem to focus on freezing and ice spells, including "Dreadful Blizzard". In her past life, she was in a relationship with Shu Saura, Moroha's other past life. She is brazen with her feelings towards Moroha to the point that she doesn't mind kissing him in public, especially in front of Satsuki. Her elder brother is the president of the school, and who nominated her for inclusion in the Strikers, where she serves as a reserve. Shizuno was born into an affluent family of utmost influence; however belonging to such a family is burdensome for her; their high expectations make her feel shackled and her only means of escape is by sleeping and dreaming about her past life with Shu Saura. She and Satsuki are rivals for Moroha's affections although they can put aside their differences when the situation demands. In her past life as the "Witch of the Netherworld", the ancient dragon turned her to ice by using her own ice spell against her.
Maya Shimon (四門 摩耶, Shimon Maya)
Voiced by: Yui Ogura (Japanese); Tia Ballard (English)
Mari's much younger sister, Maya is a prodigy whose powers as a Savior awakened at a very early age. Although she is too young to attend the Academy as a student, she serves as her sister's assistant. Her powers allow her to heal injuries and she can also cast "Field of Dreams", a field covering a wide area that allows dueling Saviors to fight without getting seriously injured and can also act as a protective barrier against any incoming attacks. Because of this, Maya's primary responsibility is safety around campus. Despite her young age, she knows how to drive her sister's car.
When Moroha arrives at the Academy, her sister assigns her to watch over him. She moves in with Moroha and even sleeps in his bed, referring to herself as his body pillow and harem personnel of the future, much to the chagrin of Moroha, Satsuki, and Shizuno.
Haruka Momochi (百地 春鹿, Momochi Haruka)
Voiced by: Maaya Uchida (Japanese); Bryn Apprill (English)
A second year student and a member of the Swords of Salvation, nicknamed "Momo." Although she is a Shirogane, she is known more for her speed than her fighting ability. It is also implied that she has feelings for Moroha shown by their good relationship and how she behaves around him.
Elena Arshavina (エレーナ・アルシャヴィナ, Erēna Arushavina)
Voiced by: Reina Ueda (Japanese), Jenya (Russian dialect) (Japanese); Mikaela Krantz (English)
Elena is a transfer student from Russia and often goes by the nickname "Lesya". She is a trained assassin who is known as the "Maneater", a reference to her demon sword "Replazan" that can consume both prana (light skills) and mana. She comes to Japan to assassinate Moroha believing (falsely) that her younger brother will be killed if she fails. It is revealed that she was an only child who was orphaned at an early age and that her memories have been manipulated by Vasilisa's subordinate, Cordat. After being freed of her demon sword by Moroha, she falls in love with him and starts to call him onii-chan, much to Satsuki's dismay.

=== Striker Unit ===
Jin Ishurugi (石動 迅, Isurugi Jin)
Voiced by: Yuichi Nakamura (Japanese); Garret Storms (English)
A third-year student who is the Captain of the school's elite anti-Metaphysical fighters called the Swords of Salvation. He is a Shirogane whose weapon is "Naivete", a long and heavy broadsword. He recruits Moroha after he defeats his younger brother. He also recruits Shizuno as a reserves upon her elder brother's recommendation. He later recruits Satsuki after she confronts a dreadnought-type Metaphysical despite being at a disadvantage. Jin admires Moroha's courage and, even though he is a senior, is willing to learn from him.
Tokiko Kanzaki (神崎登紀子, Kanzaki Tokiko)
Voiced by: Yu Kobayashi (Japanese); Trina Nishimura (English)
Tokiko is a third-year student and vice captain of the Swords of Salvation. She is a Kuroma who specializes in fire spells like "Incinerator." She is a brash pervert who makes sexual advances at anyone who catches her interest, regardless of gender. She seems particularly taken with Moroha and has pinched his rear end, straddled him, and even hugged him with his head in her cleavage. She tends to get so carried away with her sexual fantasies about Moroha that Jin has to step in to restrain her.
Sophie Mertesacker (ソフィア・メルテザッカー, Sofī Merutezakkā)
Voiced by: Machico (Japanese); Alexis Tipton (English)
Sophie is a third-year student hailing from the United States and a Shirogane member of the Swords of Salvation. She tends to intersperse her speech with English words and phrases. Her weapon resembles a two-headed Kanabo.

=== Six Heads ===
Sir Edward Lampard (サー・エドワード・ランパード, Sā Edowādo Ranpādo)
Voiced by: Wataru Hatano (Japanese); Seth Magill (English)
The United Kingdom's executive of the Six Heads. He takes a liking towards Moroha after he is nearly defeated by him, nicknaming him "Jack", since Moroha is full of surprises like a Jack-in-the-Box. He seems to dislike Natto.
Vasilisa Yuryevna Mostvaya (ヴァシリーサ・ユーリエヴナ・モストヴァヤ, Vashirīsa Yūrievuna Mosutovaya)
Voiced by: Fumi Morisawa (Japanese); Lydia Mackay (English)
Russia's executive of the Six Heads. She is known as the Lightning Empress/Russian Terror or Terror Empress. She uses her powers to manipulate people into serving her, and then executes them when she deems them as being no longer useful.
Charles Saint-Germain (シャルル・サン = ジェルマン, Sharuru San Jeruma)
Voiced by: Takehito Koyasu (Japanese); Eric Vale (English)
France's executive of the Six Heads.
Ando Suruga (駿河 安東, Suruga Andō)
Voiced by: Akira Ishida (Japanese); Joel McDonald (English)
Japan's executive of the Six Heads. He feels pain when Metaphysicals appear.
Lu Zhixin (ルー・ヂーシン, Rū Djīshin)
Voiced by: Hikaru Midorikawa (Japanese); Christopher Bevins (English)
China's executive of the Six Heads.
Arlene Highbury (アーリン・ハイバリー, Ārin Haibarī)
Voiced by: Rie Kugimiya (Japanese); Leah Clark (English)
The United States's executive of the Six Heads. She speaks to the others through a laptop with a cartoonish animal on the screen.

=== Other characters ===
Mari Shimon (マリシモン, Marishimon)
Voiced by: Yuko Minaguchi (Japanese); Heather Walker (English)
The Principal of Akane Academy and Maya's older sister. (Note: According to the Anime News Network, her name is Mari Yotsukado. She may, therefore, be Maya's older cousin rather than her sister or even not related to her at all (since it is customary in Japan to refer to females not too much older than oneself as 'older sister').)
Angela Johnson (アンジェラ·ジョンソン, Anjera Jonson)
Voiced by: Chiaki Omigawa (Japanese); Morgan Garrett (English)
Nicknamed AJ, she is Edward's maid and has deep affection for him. She later accompanies Moroha in his war against the Russian branch.
Takenaka (竹中, Takenaka)
Voiced by: Orion Pitts
He is friends with Mohoroha and Shizuno.

== Media ==
=== Light novels ===
The first light novel volume was published on November 15, 2012, by SB Creative under their GA Bunko imprint. The series ended with its 22nd volume on June 14, 2018.

No.	Release date	ISBN
1	November 15, 2012	978-4-7973-7195-6
2	February 16, 2013	978-4-7973-7305-9
3	April 16, 2013	978-4-7973-7363-9
4	August 12, 2013	978-4-7973-7472-8
5	November 15, 2013	978-4-7973-7523-7
6	February 17, 2014	978-4-7973-7556-5
7	May 15, 2014	978-4-7973-7741-5
8	August 8, 2014	978-4-7973-8016-3
9	November 14, 2014	978-4-7973-8167-2
10	January 14, 2015	978-4-7973-8248-8
11	February 13, 2015	978-4-7973-8234-1
12	June 12, 2015	978-4-7973-8332-4
13	August 08, 2015	978-4-7973-8481-9
14	October 14, 2015	978-4-7973-8523-6
15	February 13, 2016	978-4-7973-8619-6
16	June 14, 2016	978-4-7973-8737-7
17	August 9, 2016	978-4-7973-8886-2
18	October 10, 2016	978-4-7973-8944-9
19	February 14, 2017	978-4-7973-8970-8
20	June 14, 2017	978-4-7973-9181-7
21	October 12, 2017	978-4-7973-9383-5
22	June 14, 2018	978-4-7973-9705-5

=== Manga ===
A manga was serialized in Kadokawa Shoten's seinen manga magazine Comp Ace from June 2014 to February 2016 and was collected in four tankōbon volumes.

No.	Release date	ISBN
1	December 25, 2014	978-4-0410-2465-2
2	January 23, 2015	978-4-0410-2466-9
3	August 15, 2015	978-4-0410-3339-5
4	February 24, 2016	978-4-0410-3782-9

=== Anime ===
A 12-episode anime television series adaptation by Diomedéa aired between January 12 and March 30, 2015. (Note: TV Tokyo listed the series air dates on Sunday at 25:05, which is effectively monday at 1:05 a.m. JST.) The opening theme is "Hi no Ito Rinne no Gemini" (緋ノ糸輪廻ノGEMINI), composed by Katakura Mikiya and performed by Petit Milady (Aoi Yūki and Ayana Taketatsu), and the ending theme is ""Magna Idea" (マグナ・イデア, Maguna Idea), performed by Fortuna (Aoi Yūki, Ayana Taketatsu, Maaya Uchida and Yui Ogura).

The anime series has been licensed for streaming by Funimation and Crunchyroll.

No.	Title	Original release date
1	"The Reincarnater" "Tensei seshi mono" (転生せし者)	January 12, 2015
Moroha begins classes at the Akane Academy because he has inherited mystical powers from a former life. While there he meets Satsuki and Shizuno, two girls who immediately find themselves drawn to him for various reasons.
2	"Dwell within My Sword, Magic Flame" "Waga Ken ni Yadore ma Homura" (我が剣に宿れ魔焔)	January 19, 2015
Moroha and Shizuno join the Strikers. Satsuki is frustrated by her lack of ability, but one weekend, she faces down a Metaphysical at the shopping mall.
3	"The Netherworld Sorceress" "Meifu no Majo" (冥府の魔女)	January 26, 2015
Edward, one of the six Rank S Saviors, comes to Japan. Meanwhile, Shizuno refuses to talk about her past life, causing friction between her and Moroha.
4	"White Knight Assault" "Shiro kishi kyōshū" (白騎士強襲)	February 2, 2015
When Shizuno's brother tries to bully her into studying abroad, Moroha intervenes by revealing that he defeated the Dreadnought Class Metaphysical without any assistance. This leads to a high-stakes duel between himself and Sir Edward.
5	"We Are the Summer" "we are the Natsu" (we are the 夏)	February 9, 2015
The Strikers go to a small island for a summer training camp, and Satsuki takes it upon herself to become a faster, more capable Savior. Meanwhile, the Head Six are preparing to meet regarding Moroha's suggested promotion to rank S.
6	"We Are the Swords of Salvation" "Warera, kyuusei no ken nari" (我ら, 救世の剣なり)	February 16, 2015
A gigantic Metaphysical attacks just as the summer training camp is drawing to a close. Some members of the Head Six doubt Moroha's abilities, and they see this attack as the perfect opportunity to force him to prove himself in battle.
7	"The Silver-haired Stranger" "Ginpatsu no Ihōjin" (銀髪の異邦人)	February 23, 2015
A new student arrives from Russia on exchange, immediately confessing her feelings towards Moroha. Moroha is accommodating, but Shizuno has suspicions.
8	"The Magic Sword and the Holy Sword" "Maken to seiken" (魔剣と聖剣)	March 2, 2015
Lesya's true identity is revealed: she is a maneater -- an assassin. As they take swings at each other, Moroha's holy sword awakens.
9	"Siberian line" "Shiberia-yuki" (シベリア行)	March 9, 2015
Moroha challenges the Russia division to a fight on Lesya's behalf. With Edward's support, they arrive in Russia.
10	"Battle at Yekaterinburg" "Kessen· ekaterinburuku" (決戦・エカテリンブルク)	March 16, 2015
With some help from his friends, Moroha finally faces the Russian Terror on her home turf. But when her Dark Arts turn out to be as powerful as his, it's unclear who will emerge victorious in this clash of titans.
11	"The Nightmare from a Former Life" "Akumu wa zense yori" (悪夢は前世より)	March 23, 2015
The emergence of a Metaphysical delays Moroha's departure from Russia. Little does anyone realize, a dark specter from his former lives is about to reappear in Japan, forcing everyone there to face it without his aid. The Metaphysical destroys everything in sight. Moraha gets informed about the Metaphysical and remembers both of his past lifes discovering that he lost both of the people he loved by the Metaphysical.
12	"Surpass Two Lives" "Futatsu no nama o koe" (二つの生を越え)	March 30, 2015
The Saviors fight valiantly in what appears to be a losing battle against an unusually intelligent Metaphysical. When Moroha finally enters the fray, he finds it will take more than his powers alone to emerge victorious.

== Reception ==
The first episode of the anime series received negative assessments in the Winter 2015 season previews from Anime News Network critics. Rebecca Silverman noted the premise showed initial promise and was not as poor as other seasonal offerings, but she ultimately found it generic due to weak storytelling and stereotypical harem characters that resulted in a lackluster experience. Theron Martin was interested in the fantasy concept used to frame the harem elements but was put off by repetitive humor, average production quality, and sexist dialogue. Nick Creamer strongly criticized the episode's reliance on common harem tropes, including bodily humor and sexist elements that he described as reflective of a worldview that treats women as unknowable prizes. Zac Bertschy characterized the adaptation as generic and flavorless, criticizing its direction, female cast, and character designs as zero-effort junk. Silverman later reviewed the complete series in 2016. While she acknowledged that the characters Moroha and Shizuno possessed more depth than typical harem archetypes, she criticized the series for its inefficient storytelling, underdeveloped characters, and insufficient world-building. She concluded that unless a viewer was in desperate need of a new magic school narrative, the series could be safely skipped.
