= Reincarnated as a Sword =

Japanese light novel series and its adaptations

- First light novel volume cover, featuring Teacher (foreground) and Fran (background)

転生したら剣でした (Tensei Shitara Ken Deshita)
- Genre: Isekai<!-Dark fantasy<ref name='ANN1' <='' td=''>
- Novel series
- Written by: Yuu Tanaka
- Published by: Shōsetsuka ni Narō
- Original run: October 17, 2015 – February 29, 2024
- Light novel
- Written by: Yuu Tanaka
- Illustrated by: Llo
- Published by: Micro Magazine
- English publisher: NA: Seven Seas Entertainment
- Imprint: GC Novels
- Original run: July 30, 2016 – present
- Volumes: 21
- Manga
- Written by: Yuu Tanaka
- Illustrated by: Tomowo Maruyama
- Published by: Gentosha
- English publisher: NA: Seven Seas Entertainment
- Imprint: Birz Comics
- Magazine: Comic Boost
- Original run: December 9, 2016 – present
- Volumes: 20
- Manga

Reincarnated as a Sword: Another Wish
- Written by: Yuu Tanaka
- Illustrated by: Hinako Inoue
- Published by: Micro Magazine
- English publisher: NA: Seven Seas Entertainment
- Imprint: Ride Comics
- Magazine: Comic Ride
- Original run: June 1, 2020 – December 28, 2022
- Volumes: 6
- Manga

Reincarnated as a Sword: My Dish
- Written by: Yuu Tanaka
- Illustrated by: Itsuki Fujioka
- Published by: Micro Magazine
- Magazine: Comic Ride
- Original run: September 30, 2026 – scheduled
- Anime television series
- Directed by: Shinji Ishihira
- Written by: Takahiro Nagano
- Music by: Yasuharu Takanashi
- Studio: C2C
- Licensed by: Sentai Filmworks: SA/SEA: Medialink
- Original network: Tokyo MX, ABC TV, BS Asahi, AT-X
- English network: SEA: Animax Asia
- Original run: October 5, 2022 – present
- Episodes: 20
- icon

Reincarnated as a Sword, also known as I Became the Sword by Transmigrating (Japanese: 転生したら剣でした, Hepburn: Tensei Shitara Ken Deshita) or Tenken (転剣), is a Japanese light novel series written by Yuu Tanaka and illustrated by Llo. Originally published as a web novel on the Shōsetsuka ni Narō website in October 2015, the series was later published as a light novel by Micro Magazine in July 2016. A manga adaptation illustrated by Tomowo Maruyama is published by Gentosha since December 2016, as well as a spin-off manga illustrated by Hinako Inoue, published by Micro Magazine from June 2020 to December 2022. Both the light novels and manga were licensed for North American release by Seven Seas Entertainment, as well as the spin-off. An anime television series adaptation by C2C aired from October to December 2022. A second season premiered in October 2026.

== Plot ==
After dying in a car accident, an unnamed man finds himself reincarnated in another world as a sentient sword with powerful abilities and no recollection of his name, though he remembers everything else from his previous life. Accepting his fate as a sword, he begins to seek someone to become his wielder, fighting and gaining powers. He discovers a caravan of slave traders under attack by a two-headed bear. A young catgirl slave, Fran, discovers the sword, and uses him to kill the bear. After being freed from slavery, she names the sword "Teacher", and the two embark on an adventure together.

== Characters ==
Teacher (師匠, Shishō)
Voiced by: Satoshi Hino (drama CD), Shin-ichiro Miki (anime) (Japanese); Ty Mahany (English)
Originally a human in his past life, Teacher finds himself reincarnated as a powerful, legendary sword equipped with an A.I. that gives him pointers. However, after being forced in place, he resigns himself to rest until a mighty warrior can find and wield him. He soon becomes Fran's ally and primary weapon after he frees her from slavery, who also gave him his name. He is able to gain abilities from various creatures after killing them, which allows him to evolve and get stronger. He can also share his abilities with Fran. Besides Fran, a few other characters know that he is sentient. He is also a great chef. After reaching the next level, he gains the ability to shapeshift into other kinds of weapons as well as tools (such as a fishing rod), and later a small version of himself.
Fran (フラン, Furan)
Voiced by: Inori Minase (drama CD), Ai Kakuma (anime) (Japanese); Melissa Molano (English)
A 12-year-old Black Cat girl. Her parents were killed when she was young and was subsequently sold into slavery. However, when her caravan is attacked by a two-headed bear, she comes across and draws Teacher from his resting place, who helps her kill the beast and set her free. Together, the two embark on a quest to help Fran evolve fully, a feat no Black Cat has been able to achieve. When facing great danger, she will not back down despite others warning her otherwise. She loves to eat curry and sushi, but really hates Blue Cats because of their cruel and ruthless nature towards Black Cats. Her abilities all originate from Teacher. Without him, she is far weaker.
Jet (ウルシ, Urushi)
Voiced by: Hiroki Gotō (anime) (Japanese); Kyle C. Jones (English)
A wolf magic beast summoned by Teacher, who accompanies Fran's group during their journey. He can even take a pup form.
Amanda (アマンダ)
Voiced by: Ami Koshimizu (anime) (Japanese); Patricia Duran (English)
A half-elf who runs an orphanage. She has great admiration for Fran whom it is revealed she herself had looked after since her parents had died. Despite her bubbly nature, she is a very powerful warrior who is much stronger than Fran and Teacher. She also serves as a mother figure and mentor to Fran, although Fran did not enjoy it at first. She has a soft side for kids and is one of the only characters who knows about Teacher.
Klimt (クリムト, Kurimuto)
Voiced by: Wataru Hatano (anime) (Japanese); Antonio Lasanta (English)
A Wood Elf elementalist who is the guild master of the Alessa Adventurers' Guild. He has a special ability that allows him to see a person's true nature. He is suspicious about the source of Fran's abilities after he could not identify her, but allows her to join the guild and soon sees that she isn't a bad person. He is Frion's uncle.
Donadrond (ドナドロンド, Donadorondo)
Voiced by: Tetsu Inada (anime) (Japanese); Cyrus Rodas (English)
An Oni warrior who acts as examiner for the Adventurers' Guild, challenging prospective adventurers to duels to test their skills. He is defeated by Fran and allows her to pass the exam.
Nell (ネル, Neru)
Voiced by: Rumi Okubo (anime) (Japanese); Molly Searcy (English)
The receptionist for the Alessa town Adventurers' Guild. She possesses a hidden dark side wishing death on adventurers she dislikes, but quickly warms up to Fran.
Gallus (ガルス, Garusu)
Voiced by: Shinpachi Tsuji (anime) (Japanese); John Swasey (English)
An old dwarf with a passion for blacksmithing. He supplies Fran with all sorts of equipment and knows about Teacher due to him having an ability that bypasses identity blocking.
Randell (ランデル)
Voiced by: Hiromichi Tezuka (anime) (Japanese); Heath Morrow (English)
An adventurer that Fran and Teacher rescued sometime after the two met.
Lily (リリー)
Voiced by: Megumi Sato (anime) (Japanese); Natalie Rial (English)
An adventurer that Fran and Teacher meet during their journey.
Crull (クラール)
Voiced by: Takaaki Uchino (anime) (Japanese); Adam Noble (English)
An adventurer that Fran and Teacher meet during their journey.
Eustace (ユースタス)
Voiced by: Souma Shiomi (anime); James Marler
An adventurer that Fran and Teacher meet during their journey.
August Allsand (オーギュスト・アルサンド)
Voiced by: Yutaka Aoyama (anime) (Japanese); Adam Noble (English)
The cruel vice-captain of Alessa's guards who bears a hatred towards adventurers. He has two special abilities that allow him to tell if a person is lying or not and charm others, although he abuses his skills. These abilities were stolen from him by Teacher, which results in his reputation being ruined. To get revenge on Fran, he hires the Blue Cat assassin Gyuran to kill her, but she turns the tables on them and kills Gyuran instead. August is then put under house arrest permanently by his father as punishment for his crimes.
Gyuran (ギュラン)
Voiced by: Tetsu Shiratori (anime) (Japanese); David Wald (English)
A Blue Cat assassin. His kind have been known enemies of the Black Cats and is the reason why Fran ended up in slavery in the first place. He takes pleasure in killing Black Cats and selling them into slave labor. August hires him to kill Fran for sabotaging his reputation, but she manages to kill him instead and take his weapon, avenging most of her kind.
Count Holmes (アルメス伯)
The ruler of Alessa and August's father. After learning of his son's crimes, he punishes August by putting him under house arrest forever. However, it is implied that he has ulterior motives.
Cruise Riouselle
Voiced by: Yasuyuki Kase (anime) (Japanese); Kiba Walker (English)
The leader of a party called the Azure Guardians and an examiner tasked with helping a group of warriors whose goal is to defeat a group of spider monsters in one of the world's dungeons.
Rig
Voiced by: Tomohiro Ōno (anime) (Japanese); Shane Finemore (English)
A member of the Azure Guardians and an examiner tasked with helping a group of warriors whose goal is to defeat a group of spider monsters in one of the world's dungeons.
Eizelle
Voiced by: Makoto Tamura (anime) (Japanese); Jeremy Gee (English)
A member of the Azure Guardians and an examiner tasked with helping a group of warriors whose goal is to defeat a group of spider monsters in one of the world's dungeons.
Krad (クラッド)
Voiced by: Tomohiro Yamaguchi (anime) (Japanese); Scott Gibbs (English)
The leader of a group called Dragon's Roar, who join a group of powerful warriors to defeat some spider monsters in a dungeon. Upon meeting Fran, he is resentful towards the idea of having her and Amanda join the party that mostly consists of men, but soon respects her after seeing how powerful she and Amanda are.
Bart
Voiced by: Hiromichi Tezuka (anime) (Japanese); Matthew David Rudd (English)
One of the members of Dragon's Roar.
Victor
Voiced by: Takuya Nakashima (anime) (Japanese); Cody House (English)
One of the members of Dragon's Roar.
Gennel
Voiced by: Eiji Miyashita (anime) (Japanese); James Marler (English)
One of the members of Dragon's Roar.
Furion
Voiced by: Yō Kitazawa (anime) (Japanese); Bobby Haworth (English)
An elf sorcerer who is the leader of a party called the Eyes of the Forest. He is also Klimt's nephew.
Kinan
Voiced by: Yuuki Shin (anime)
Fran's father, whom Amanda knows of before their deaths and entrusted their daughter to her.
Flamia
Voiced by: Suzuko Mimori (anime) (Japanese); Shelley Calene-Black (English)
Fran's mother, whom Amanda knows of before their deaths and entrusted their daughter to her.
Jean Du Vix
Voiced by: Yuma Uchida (anime) (Japanese); Cole Feuchter (English)
A necromancer. He is not really evil and serves as an ally to Fran and Teacher. He also knows that Teacher is sentient as, like Gallus, he has a skill that can bypass identity blocking.
Bernard
A friendly undead and Jean's servant.
Nameless
A boy who is a slave transformed into a monster called the Lich in a lab located on a floating island. He is eventually destroyed by Fran and Teacher.
Andy
An undead dragon that Jean summons to help get to the floating island. He sacrifices himself to help Jean, Fran, Teacher, and Jet get through a barrier around the island.
Selkan
An hulky undead that Jean summons to bypass traps, as he cannot feel pain.
Fly
A gassy undead that Jean summons for scouting purposes. He can multiply. He is presumably killed by the Lich.
Stephan (ステファン, Sutefan)
Voiced by: Shiori Izawa
Jean's ghostly minion, who stayed behind on the floating island to keep the Undead Eater at bay. He can take the form of Nameless's original human form. He was formerly one of the Lich's minions. After the Lich and the dungeon on the floating island were destroyed, he vanishes to the afterlife.
Fult and Satya Phyllius
Voiced by: Satsuki Kokubu (Fult), Yurie Kozakai (Satya)
Twin siblings who are the prince and princess of the Phyllius Kingdom. They are the same age as Fran. Satya appears to really like Fran. The two hired Fran to serve as their bodyguard during their journey.
Salut
A dark knight who serves as a bodyguard and caretaker of Fult and Satya. Though a powerful warrior, he has a soft side for kids.
Sellid
An elderly chamberlain who works for Fult and Satya. He is uncomfortable being around those that he deems poor or filthy and is shown to be a bit wary towards strangers. Fran doesn't like him so much.
Miriam Vermilion Seedrun
Voiced by: Hazuki Ogino
A princess from Seedrun and Serimea and Suarez's sister. She is a powerful warrior and seeks to take down her evil but foolish brother.
Serimea Vermilion Seedrun
Voiced by: Sayumi Suzushiro
A princess from Seedrun and Miriam and Suarez's sister. She is rumored to have been killed, but this was proven false; it was a lie told by Suarez. She had actually gone into hiding and plans to take down her evil but foolish brother.
Varuza
Voiced by: Katsuyuki Konishi
A powerful warrior who serves as Dwight's second in command and the leader of the Black Fang group.
Rengill
A sea captain and a member of the Lucille Trade Association, a large merchant guild.
Dwight
The admiral of Seedrun's navy, who is highly arrogant and sees pirates and those from Phyllius as enemies.
Suarez Vermilion Seedrun
Miriam and Serimea's wicked brother and the current king of Seedrun.
Kara
A woman who serves as an ally to Miriam and Serimea.
Bike
An ally to Miriam and Serimea.
Julius
Serimea, Miriam, and Suarez's uncle, who is in league with his nephew.
Gladio
Serimea, Miriam, and Suarez's cousin.
Yos
A soldier from Phyllius. He is killed by Varuza.

== Media ==
=== Light novel ===
Written by Yuu Tanaka, Reincarnated as a Sword was published on the novel posting website Shōsetsuka ni Narō from October 2015 to February 2024, with side stories still being written as of October 2025. The series was acquired and published by Micro Magazine under their GC Novels imprint with illustrations by Llo, with 21 volumes released as of September 2026. The fifth volume's limited edition was bundled with a drama CD, telling an original story.

Seven Seas Entertainment announced that they have licensed the series for publication, with the first volume released on August 6, 2019.

No.	Original release date	Original ISBN	English release date	English ISBN
1	July 30, 2016	978-4-89637-574-9	May 2, 2019 (Digital); August 6, 2019 (Physical)	978-1-64275-141-3
2	December 26, 2016	978-4-89637-608-1	June 27, 2019 (Digital); September 24, 2019 (Physical)	978-1-64275-142-0
3	June 30, 2017	978-4-89637-639-5	August 22, 2019 (Digital); November 19, 2019 (Physical)	978-1-64275-724-8
4	November 24, 2017	978-4-89637-670-8	December 12, 2019 (Digital); February 25, 2020 (Physical)	978-1-64505-196-1
5	May 30, 2018	978-4-89637-750-7; 978-4-89637-751-4 (LE)	March 12, 2020 (Digital); June 16, 2020 (Physical)	978-1-64505-463-4
6	October 30, 2018	978-4-89637-826-9	June 11, 2020 (Digital); September 15, 2020 (Physical)	978-1-64505-722-2
7	March 29, 2019	978-4-89637-863-4	October 8, 2020 (Digital); January 5, 2021 (Physical)	978-1-64505-821-2
8	September 28, 2019	978-4-89637-924-2	April 8, 2021 (Digital); May 25, 2021 (Physical)	978-1-64827-203-5
9	March 30, 2020	978-4-89637-990-7	September 23, 2021 (Digital); October 12, 2021 (Physical)	978-1-64827-266-0
10	September 30, 2020	978-4-86716-057-2	February 3, 2022 (Digital); May 17, 2022 (Physical)	978-1-64827-468-8
11	March 31, 2021	978-4-86716-124-1	December 27, 2022	978-1-63858-252-6
12	September 24, 2021	978-4-86716-189-0	March 9, 2023 (Digital); May 16, 2023 (Physical)	978-1-63858-649-4
13	March 30, 2022	978-4-86716-269-9	October 12, 2023 (Digital); November 14, 2023 (Physical)	978-1-68579-641-9
14	September 30, 2022	978-4-86716-340-5	January 25, 2024 (Digital); May 21, 2024 (Physical)	979-8-88843-640-0
15	March 30, 2023	978-4-86716-408-2	October 10, 2024 (Digital); November 5, 2024 (Physical)	979-8-89160-269-4
16	September 29, 2023	978-4-86716-408-2	April 17, 2025 (Digital); May 13, 2025 (Physical)	979-8-89160-956-3
17	March 29, 2024	978-4-86716-554-6	October 14, 2025 (Physical)	979-8-89373-468-3
18	September 30, 2024	978-4-86716-637-6	February 12, 2026 (Digital); March 10, 2026 (Physical)	979-8-89373-958-9
19	March 31, 2025	978-4-86716-739-7	July 9, 2026 (Digital); August 4, 2026 (Physical)	979-8-89765-171-9
20	October 30, 2025	978-4-86716-856-1	January 5, 2027 (Physical)	979-8-89863-154-3
21	September 30, 2026	978-4-82500-045-2	—	—

=== Manga ===
A manga adaptation by Tomowo Maruyawa was serialized in Gentosha's Denshi Birz magazine from December 9, 2016, to January 15, 2018, which resumed publishing on Comic Boost after the magazine was cancelled. The series's chapters were collected in 20 tankōbon volumes since the first volume's release in April 2017. Seven Seas Entertainment also licensed the manga for North American release, with the first volume released on December 17, 2019.

A spin-off manga written by Tanaka and illustrated by Hinako Inoue, titled Reincarnated as a Sword: Another Wish, was serialized in Micro Magazine's Comic Ride website from June 1, 2020, to January 30, 2023. The spin-off manga is also licensed by Seven Seas.

A second spin-off manga written by Tanaka and illustrated by Itsuki Fujioka, titled Reincarnated as a Sword: My Dish, will begin serialization in Comic Ride on September 30, 2026.

No.	Original release date	Original ISBN	English release date	English ISBN
1	April 24, 2017	978-4-344-83975-5	December 17, 2019	978-1-64275-755-2
2	November 24, 2017	978-4-344-84097-3	February 18, 2020	978-1-64505-207-4
3	March 24, 2018	978-4-344-84178-9	June 9, 2020	978-1-64505-479-5
4	September 21, 2018	978-4-344-84303-5	October 20, 2020	978-1-64505-767-3
5	March 22, 2019	978-4-344-84417-9	April 13, 2021	978-1-64505-970-7
6	September 24, 2019	978-4-344-84507-7; 978-4-344-84508-4 (SE)	June 1, 2021	978-1-64827-236-3
7	March 24, 2020	978-4-344-84623-4	September 14, 2021	978-1-64827-313-1
8	September 24, 2020	978-4-344-84706-4	January 11, 2022	978-1-64827-481-7
9	March 24, 2021	978-4-344-84823-8	October 25, 2022	978-1-63858-359-2
10	September 24, 2021	978-4-344-84893-1; 978-4-344-84894-8 (SE)	April 25, 2023	978-1-63858-753-8
11	March 30, 2022	978-4-344-85007-1; 978-4-344-85008-8 (SE)	October 17, 2023	978-1-63858-982-2
12	September 24, 2022	978-4-344-85107-8; 978-4-344-85108-5 (SE)	April 23, 2024	979-8-88843-378-2
13	March 24, 2023	978-4-344-85198-6	October 29, 2024	979-8-89160-196-3
14	September 22, 2023	978-4-344-85298-3	April 22, 2025	979-8-89160-939-6
15	March 23, 2024	978-4-344-85386-7	September 16, 2025	979-8-89373-469-0
16	September 24, 2024	978-4-344-85464-2	January 20, 2026	979-8-89373-959-6
17	March 24, 2025	978-4-344-85568-7	June 9, 2026	979-8-89765-172-6
18	September 24, 2025	978-4-344-85637-0	November 3, 2026	979-8-89765-991-3
19	March 24, 2026	978-4-344-85731-5	—	—
20	September 24, 2026	978-4-344-85815-2	—	—

==== Another Wish ====
No.	Original release date	Original ISBN	English release date	English ISBN
1	September 30, 2020	978-4-86716-060-2	January 18, 2022	978-1-64827-678-1
2	March 27, 2021	978-4-86716-120-3	March 22, 2022	978-1-63858-168-0
3	September 24, 2021	978-4-86716-187-6	February 14, 2023	978-1-63858-613-5
4	March 31, 2022	978-4-86716-266-8	May 16, 2023	978-1-68579-458-3
5	September 29, 2022	978-4-86716-337-5	December 26, 2023	979-8-88843-092-7
6	March 31, 2023	978-4-86716-404-4	June 18, 2024	979-8-88843-649-3

=== Anime ===
An anime television series adaptation was announced in the twelfth volume of the light novel on September 24, 2021. The series is produced by C2C and directed by Shinji Ishihira, with Takahiro Nagano writing and supervising the scripts, Atsuki Saitō designing the characters and serving as chief animation director, and Yasuharu Takanashi composing the music. The series aired from October 5 to December 21, 2022, on Tokyo MX and other networks. The opening theme song is "Tensei Shitara Ken Deshita", performed by Kishida Kyoudan & The Akeboshi Rockets, while the ending theme song is "More Strongly", performed by Maon Kurosaki. At Anime Expo 2022, Sentai Filmworks announced that they licensed the series outside of Asia, which was followed by an English dub as announced at Anime Weekend Atlanta on October 28, 2022.

Following the airing of the final episode, a second season was announced, with the staff and cast reprising their roles. The season premiered on October 8, 2026. (Note: Tokyo MX listed the season premiere on October 7 at 24:00, which is effectively October 8 at midnight JST.) The opening theme song is "Dream of Butterfly", performed by FZMZ, while the ending theme song is "Baribari Buddy" (バリバリBuddy), performed by Hanabie.

==== Episodes ====
===== Season 1 (2022) =====
No. overall	No. in season	Title	Directed by	Storyboarded by	Original release date (Note: Episodes are released on ABEMA and HIDIVE a week before their air dates on television.)
1	1	"Catgirl Meets Sword"; Transliteration: "Mofumimi ga Deatta no wa Ken Deshita" (Japanese: モフ耳が出会ったのは剣でした)	Kazunobu Shimizu	Shinji Ishihira	October 5, 2022
An unnamed man is tragically killed in a car accident and reincarnates in another world as a sentient, magical sword. With telekinesis, he is able to fly and learn skills by killing monsters. He decides to continue slaying monsters and become the most powerful sword in the world while waiting for his destined wielder. Elsewhere, a Black Cat-girl named Fran lives as an abused slave, outfitted with a collar that prevents her from defying orders, but dreams of greatness. One day, after acquiring numerous skills and great warrior abilities, the sword enters a forest where touching the ground drains his magic to zero. Unable to fly, he is trapped for months. The humans Fran belongs to are attacked by a bear monster. Seeing her fellow slaves and one of her owners being slaughtered, leaving her one of the only survivors, she is desperate to help and spots the sword nearby. Touching his handle, Fran is able to communicate with the sword via telepathy. He shares all his skills with her, turning her into a great warrior who uses him to easily kill the monster. Fran's owner then demands she give him the sword and starts hurting her when she refuses. Angered by this abuse, the sword kills him and burns Fran's slave contract, freeing her. He officially asks Fran to be his wielder and she agrees as it is her goal to evolve, something no Black Cat has ever managed before. Seeing him as her teacher, Fran names him Teacher. Teacher decides to dedicate his new life to keeping Fran safe.
2	2	"The Hellish Trial at the Adventurer's Guild"; Transliteration: "Bōkensha Girudo ni Ittara Oni Shikenkan Deshita" (Japanese: 冒険者ギルドに行ったら鬼試験官でした)	Ayaka Tsujihashi	Shinji Ishihira	October 12, 2022
Fran rescues an adventurer named Randell from a goblin ambush. Teacher keeps his sentience a secret and only speaks to Fran via telepathy. In the town Alessa, Nell the adventurer guild receptionist informs Fran she must pass a battle simulation, and the examiner is Donadrond, a powerful Oni. Fran and Teacher combine sword skills with magic, which Nell notes should be impossible unless Fran had two brains. Donadrond happily admits defeat. Guild master Klimt accepts Fran as a Sword-Mage. Fran sells some of her loot for a small fortune, earning jealousy from nearby mercenaries. Believing a Black Cat could only be a thief and liar, they pick a fight with her, but Nell defends her. Unable to stand them insulting the Black Cat species, Fran severs the lead mercenary's legs while beating up the rest. They insist Fran should be arrested for attacking them, but Nell and the guild adventurers all agree it was self-defense and fines the lead mercenary 100,000 gold, with Nell revealing her dark side by refusing to heal his legs until he pays. Teacher decides they need a room for the night and armor for Fran. Meanwhile, a dwarf adventurer, who has the highest level Appraisal skill God Sight, is fully aware Teacher is a living, intelligent sword.
3	3	"The Grizzled Old Blacksmith"; Transliteration: "Mahō Kajishi wa Kusemono Deshita" (Japanese: 魔法鍛冶師は曲者でした)	Hiro Ōki	Hiro Ōki	October 19, 2022
The dwarf, Garrus, invites Fran to his shop, explaining he is the famous Wandering Blacksmith of Granzell. Other adventurers are jealous as Garrus is notoriously choosy over who he sells his equipment to. After selling Fran enchanted armor, Garrus asks about Teacher. Teacher is worried he is not as strong as other swords, but Garrus reveals that what makes Teacher most powerful is his ultra-high mana conductivity; the more magic Fran puts into him, the more powerful he becomes. Garrus admits he is not skilled enough to forge a sword like Teacher, so he could only have been forged by a Divine Blacksmith. Teacher pays Garrus to make a scabbard for Teacher and other equipment for Fran. With time to spare, Fran and teacher acquire more clothes, food and a room. Elsewhere, the surviving goblins that ambushed Randell use magic to evolve into Hobgoblins. On her first quest, herb gathering, Fran rescues three adventurers, Lily, Crull and Eustace, by slaying the Hobgoblins. The adventurers worry; the presence of Hobgoblins means a Goblin King has recently evolved, and should locate a Goblin Queen, their offspring will form a Hobgoblin army that could even threaten Alessa. Fran decides to destroy their nest alone, but Teacher worries as Fran attacks recklessly, ignoring the injuries she receives.
4	4	"The Terrifying Goblin Stampede"; Transliteration: "Goburin Sutanpīdo wa Ōgoto Deshita" (Japanese: ゴブリンスタンピードはオオゴトでした)	Ayumu Uwano	Ayumu Uwano	October 26, 2022
Fran kills all the goblins present, saying she must become stronger. The adventurers return with reinforcements and they find that the goblins came from a dungeon. Klimt organizes a party to raid the dungeon the next day and gives Fran a promotion. Garrus repairs her armor and says Dungeon Masters are empowered by the Goddess of Chaos. Fran takes Teacher with her to the bathhouse, much to his embarrassment, but Nell reprimands her for bringing a weapon. Nell explains the Goddess of Chaos brings challenges to the world like Dungeon Masters to prevent stagnation. The God of War was evil and slain by other gods, but not before he created goblins and other monsters. Nell complains that August, the captain of the guard who dislikes adventurers, refuses to send knights to assist them and wants Amanda, the guild's ace, to return from her journey. The next day, Garrus gives Teacher his completed scabbard and Fran joins the party, led by Donadrond. The goblins ambush them at the dungeon entrance and kill most of the party. Fran kills several goblins and enters the dungeon alone. Inside, a goblin gloats that with the monster he just summoned, the Goblin Empire is invincible.
5	5	"The Feeble First Dungeon"; Transliteration: "Danjon Debyū wa Musō Deshita" (Japanese: ダンジョンデビューは無双でした)	Yūri Kozukata	Shinji Ishihira	November 2, 2022
Fran and Teacher decide to only kill and absorb crystals from goblins with useful skills and leave the rest to the other adventurers. They find the Goblin King and Queen, but kill them with one attack to their surprise. They realize the dungeon goes deeper and fight their way through a swarm of giant beetles. They enter a hidden door and find the Dungeon Master, an intelligent goblin who managed to summon a high level greater demon. The Dungeon Master boasts he will take over the world with his servant, but the demon warns his summoner not to give him orders and attacks Fran. He is much more powerful than any enemy she and Teacher have faced before and slices off Fran's hands, but Teacher quickly heals her. Meanwhile, the rest of the party cannot get past the door to help her. Teacher asks Fran to retreat, but she refuses and continues to fight the demon. The demon acknowledges that Fran's sword skills are superior to his, and then uses his special Skill Taker ability to steal her sword skills, boasting that she is doomed.
6	6	"The Greater Demon Cheated"; Transliteration: "Gurētā Dēmon wa Chīto Deshita" (Japanese: 上級悪魔(グレーターデーモン)はチートでした)	Hiroki Ikeshita	Shinji Ishihira	November 9, 2022
Skill Taker fails to work because Fran's sword skills are borrowed from Teacher. The Dungeon Master attempts to assist the demon, but he refuses his help. Teacher remembers a Dungeon Master's summons cannot survive without him and tells Fran to aim her attacks at him, forcing the demon to shield him. Fran hurls Teacher at the Dungeon Master, but when the demon tries to attack him, he unexpectedly changes direction and impales the demon instead, killing him. Teacher's blade breaks in the process, making Fran think he is dead before he reveals he can repair himself thanks to absorbing the demon's crystal. They kill the Dungeon Master, making the dungeon disappear. The rest of the party congratulates Fran, but Donadrond berates her for going off on her own and not waiting for them. Teacher soothes her by promising to make her curry, and reveals he gained Skill Taker, and uses his new experience levels to max Skill Taker and his sword skills. Klimt calls Fran and asks what happened to the demon's crystal, as it is a highly valuable material. Fran conceals the fact that Teacher absorbed it and says it just disappeared. Klimt believes her, but August barges into the office and obnoxiously calls her a liar.
7	7	"The Horrible Lieutenant of the Knights Brigade"; Transliteration: "Kishidan Fuku Danchō wa Yana Yatsu Deshita" (Japanese: 騎士団副団長はヤな奴でした)	Kentarō Mizuno	Shinji Ishihira	November 16, 2022
August, vice-captain of Alessa's knights, uses his skill Falsehood to identify Fran's lies. Teacher appraises August and finds he abuses his skills to falsely accuse commoners and charm his superiors. August demands all the dungeon loot as a fine for Fran lying to a noble, but Klimt refuses as the loot belongs to the adventurers. Teacher uses Skill-Taker to secretly steal August's skills Falsehood and Etiquette, leaving him socially dysfunctional. Fran is promoted to D-rank and becomes popular with her guild-mates. Fran discovers Etiquette has made her more charming. Teacher dreams of his reincarnation which included three beautiful women. Teacher makes Fran the curry he promised and other meals to keep preserved in his dimensional storage space for Fran to eat on long journeys. Fran hears a rumor that August socially embarrassed himself before royalty, angering his father Count Holmes. An insane August appears to Fran, balding and so filthy Fran mistakes him for a zombie. He accuses Fran of cursing him, ruining his life, and has hired an assassin to kill her. The assassin is revealed to be a Blue Cat, long time enemies of Black Cats like Fran. Elsewhere, a woman with pointed ears approaches Alessa.
8	8	"The Villainous Blue Cat"; Transliteration: "Aoneko-zoku wa Kyūteki Deshita" (Japanese: 青猫族は仇敵でした)	Hiro Ōki	Hiro Ōki	November 23, 2022
Fran reveals it was the Blue Cats who systematically made the Black Cats weaker and discriminated against them over centuries. The Blue Cat, Gyuran, gleefully describes torturing and murdering Black Cats. Fran is afraid until Teacher reminds her she is not alone. Fran severs Gyuran's limbs and loots his sword, swearing that one day Black Cats will no longer fear Blue Cats, then severs his head. She considers killing August too, but is stopped by Klimt who has made a deal with August's father; in exchange for a large fee to the guild, August will be placed under house arrest forever. The elven eared woman, A-rank adventurer Amanda, appears and instantly falls in love with Fran's cuteness, declaring herself Fran's new mother, which Fran rejects. Amanda begins following Fran everywhere until she complains to Nell who reveals Amanda actually runs an orphanage, earning the title Guardian of Children, despite seeming a creepy stalker. Klimt offers Fran 5 high level monster crystals if she will join adventurers investigating a spider monster nest in an already defeated dungeon. Fran accepts and also receives permission to investigate another active dungeon near Ulmutt village. Teacher absorbs the crystals to level up again, but Fran is despondent when Amanda insists on joining the quest as well.
9	9	"The Monstrous Rank A Adventurer"; Transliteration: "Ranku Ē Bōkensha wa Bakemono Deshita" (Japanese: ランクA冒険者はバケモノでした)	Takeshi Nishino	Takeshi Nishino	November 30, 2022
Fran learns that defeating the spiders is also a promotion exam for two E-rank teams, Dragon's Roar and Forest Eyes, overseen by the examiners Cruise, Rig and Eizelle. Krad, leader of Dragon's Roar, who doesn't like the idea of women joining them, accuses Fran of manipulating Klimt into promoting her unfairly, but his bullying is constantly stopped by Amanda. He later challenges her to a duel to prove she earned her promotion, so she uses the flat of Teacher's blade to beat him up. Intrigued, Amanda asks to duel as well, wagering Fran must call her Mama if she loses while Fran wagers that if she wins, Amanda will leave her alone. After a short difficult fight, Fran is defeated, but not before managing to land one hit on Amanda. Amanda is unharmed due to one of her defensive skills, but is impressed Fran is the first person in years to come close to hurting her. Their duel accidentally starts some fires, but the party manages to put them out. Teacher is proud of Fran's progress. Unconscious, Fran dreams of her mother. Upon awakening, she agrees to call Amanda Mama, but Amanda stops her as it is obvious Fran's mother holds a special place in her heart, but she swears to always support Fran. Using Falsehood, Teacher detects Amanda's every promise of motherly affection is sincere and she has truly earned her title Guardian of Children. Krad realizes Fran really is as strong as everyone claims. He also reveals that they all challenged Amanda, but also could not beat her. The next morning, everyone prepares to enter the dungeon.
10	10	"The Totally Unfair Spider Traps"; Transliteration: "Kumo no Torappu wa Hansoku Deshita" (Japanese: 蜘蛛のトラップは反則でした)	Ayumu Uwano	Shinji Ishihira	December 7, 2022
A sinister man approaches the dungeon while the party enters it. Amanda reveals that she lost several comrades to this dungeon in the past, leading her to care for their orphaned children. They battle booby traps, giant insects, and Trap Spiders while collecting their valuable silk. Amanda gives Fran combat and magic lessons while noting how unusual it is that Fran can use three elements. Upon learning about it, Fran and Teacher quickly master Thunder magic. Fran thanks Amanda by sharing curry, which no one has heard of and she finds delicious. Deeper in the dungeon, the Trap Spiders have evolved into Trick Spiders with deadlier venom and greater strength and speed. The party retreats, but two of Krad's friends, Bart and Victor, bump into Fran and they land on a teleport square. They are teleported away without their weapons, including Teacher, and land in front of the Trick Spider's ultimate evolved form, the massive Trickster Spider. As Amanda picks Teacher up and they search for them, Teacher cannot reach Fran with telepathy, while a now-powerless Fran panics and asks what she can do without Teacher.
11	11	"The Wolf Summoned Hither"; Transliteration: "Shōkan Shitara Marō Deshita" (Japanese: 召喚したら魔狼でした)	Shigeru Ueda	Shinji Ishihira	December 14, 2022
The Trickster Spider, which has the upper body of a woman, toys with Fran, Bart, and Victor by triggering booby traps on them. The party splits up to look for them while Amanda goes by herself. With little options, Teacher reveals he can speak and move to Amanda and summons an Onyx Wolf as a familiar to try to find Fran. The wolf goes berserk due to excess mana and Amanda says Familiars have to be named. Teacher names it Jet and it calms down, evolves into the much larger Darkness Wolf, and follows Fran's scent. Fran, Bart, and Victor are incapacitated by poison darts and the Trickster Spider sends her spiderlings to devour them. Fran imagines herself as a helpless slave again, but a vision of Teacher inspires her to get up and fight back with her bare hands. Teacher, Jet, and Amanda arrive and blast the Trickster Spider, who retreats, then heals Fran. Fran is happy to meet Jet and they confess Teacher's secrets to Amanda, who is amazed. They heal Bart and Victor, who had passed out and didn't hear Fran's confession, and go to the rendezvous point, but no one else is there. The Trickster Spider heals her wounds and screams, which they hear, then they see a large white bird appear in a flash of light.
12	12	"An Excited Fran Sets Off"; Transliteration: "Tabidatsu Furan wa Wakuwaku Deshita" (Japanese: 旅立つフランはワクワクでした)	Kazunobu Shimizu	Shinji Ishihira	December 21, 2022
The bird is Tarua, the familiar of a party member who leads the group to the others who are trapped by the Trickster Spider and her children. As they rescue them, Fran fights the Trickster Spider. Amanda remembers how she adopted a male and female Black Cat named Kinan and Flamia, but refused to teach them how to fight due to not wanting them to get hurt, which backfired when they tried to become adventurers anyway and got killed. Determined not to let Fran die, she annihilates the Trickster Spider, but angers Fran by destroying its crystal too. After clearing the dungeon, Klimt gives Fran permission to go to Ulmutt and she is promoted. Garrus gives Fran new armor; Teacher is angered that it exposes her belly, but Garrus shows it protects her with a force field. Garrus says he is going to Ulmutt too, by a different route. As the guild bids Fran goodbye, she finally calls Amanda Mama, causing her to realize Fran is Kinan and Flamia's daughter. Klimt discusses with his nephew, Tarua's owner, how August's father hired someone to give the spiders evolution potions. Tarua judges Fran has good character and is not a spy despite her unusual strength. Fran surfs through the sky on Teacher and approaches a floating island, only for them to get knocked down and crash-land in a building where they are confronted by the necromancer Jean du Vix.

===== Season 2 (2026) =====
No. overall	No. in season	Title	Directed by	Storyboarded by	Original release date
13	1	"The Floating Island"; Transliteration: "Sora ni Ukanderu no wa Shima Deshita" (Japanese: 空に浮かんでるのは島でした)	Kazunobu Shimizu	Shinji Ishihira	October 8, 2026
In a flashback, an enslaved boy known as Nameless lives among other young slaves, also called Nameless, in a facility. In the present, Fran, Teacher, and Jet travel to another town called Port Dars when they see a floating island in the sky. To satisfy Fran's curiosity, Teacher agrees to fly her up to it, but they are ambushed by an undead knight who proves to be an equal match to them. However, Fran, Teacher, and Jet all run out of MP, so they can no longer maintain their flight and fall to the ground below, crashing through the roof of an atelier owned by the Rank B necromancer Jean du Vix and his undead servant Bernard. Seeing how capable Fran and Teacher are thanks to his Soulsight ability, which allows him to see that Teacher is a sentient sword, Jean enlists their aid to help him clear the dungeon on the floating island. The next day, Jean raises an bone wyvern named Andy and use it to breach the island's defenses, landing on it safely. Jean then thanks Andy for its help before purifying its spirit and allowing it to pass on. In another flashback, Nameless is seen locked in a cell as his friends are subjected to deadly experiments.
14	2	"Jean Du Vix is Excellent" (Japanese: ジャン・ドゥービーは優秀でした)	Unknown	TBA	October 15, 2026
The group fight their way into the dungeon, where Jean deduces Teacher's ability to absorb monster skills and tells him that the dungeon contains monsters with the Identity Jammer and Fake Identity skills, which can confuse even Soulsight. To get past traps, Jean summons an undead named Selkan, who can help them disable the traps as he can't get hurt and they progress deeper into the dungeon. In a third flashback, Nameless is subjected to a dark experiment and turns into a monster called the Undead Eater. After defeating some Mimics, Teacher and Fran at last gain the Fake Identity skill. Jean summons a ghost-like monster called Fly, who can multiply to scout ahead. After defeating a powerful monster, Teacher gains a new skill called Transform, which allows him to change into other kinds of weapons, such as a war hammer. The group eventually encounter who appears to be Nameless, who has Identity Jammer. Instead of attacking, the being reveals he is Stephan, Jean's ghostly minion whom he left behind to keep a monster called the Undead Eater at bay. Stephan has now taken Nameless's original human form. The group continue through the dungeon with Stephan's help. Stephan eventually leaves the group to go on a secret mission for Jean. The group encounter a powerful undead, who resembles a female warrior, eventually slaying it. The group then encounter the same undead knight from before.
15	3	"The Undead Monster Was Tough as Nails" (Japanese: アンデッドはガチガチでした)	TBA	TBA	October 22, 2026
The group battle the undead knight, who summons its skeletal horse. The knight and the horse prove to be extremely strong foes to Fran, Teacher, and Jet. Teacher eventually deduces that the knight's crystal is inside its head. In an effort to throw off the knight, Fran and Teacher switch with Jet and destroy the horse first. However, the knight instead activates its Unleash Potential skill to give itself a massive power boost. Fran, Jet, and Teacher are overpowered while Jean fails to weaken the knight. Skill Taker also proves ineffective. With Fran's urging, Teacher invests experience points into their Sword Art skill so they can use a finishing move that they practiced earlier to defeat the knight for good. They also take the knight's sword, Death Gaze, and Teacher makes another meal for them. Jean decides to wield a special staff, Nether Lord's Blessing, despite the fact it will sap away his life. When Jean can no longer sense Fly, a teleporter activates, bringing them to the dungeon's core chamber where the dungeon's master, the Undead King, awaits. Fran is put in a painful trance, but Teacher snaps her out of it. Unable to escape, the group proceed to face off against monsters summoned by the Undead King.
16	4	"The Hopeless Battle Against the Undead King"	TBA	TBA	October 29, 2026
As Stephan goes to a secret chamber, the group face the Undead King, known as the Lich. Jean manages to defeat the first line of undead monsters. The group are unable to harm the Lich or analyze him as the King summons stronger minions. Stephan eventually destroys the Grudge Reactor, which absorbs grudges in the dungeon that empowers the Lich, weakening the Lich's power and allowing them to analyze him. Enraged, the Lich summons two headless warriors and overpowers the group, but Jean summons Stephan, who saves them. The Lich realizes that Stephan was one of his former minions. With Jean and Stephan's help, Fran and Teacher use Skill Taker to steal the Lich's skills and defeat him, but his head survives and draws in resentment energy that floods the chamber. Everyone shields themselves from it, but the energy targets Fran and Teacher, who shields Fran from it as he tries to find a way to stop it.
17	5	"Bid Farewell with a Smile"	TBA	TBA	November 5, 2026
Teacher faces great danger while protecting Fran from the volatile energy, but then establishes a psychic connection with his A.I. assistant, who takes the form of a goddess and helps Teacher by upgrading his skills as well as unlocking new ones. He uses one of his new skills to obtain a still-intact crystal from an undead warrior, allowing him to dispel the dark energy, exposing the Lich. Teacher steals the Lich's skills and teleports away with Fran after the Lich explodes upon defeat. Fran and Teacher both end up outside and find themselves freefalling away from the floating island. Stephan catches up to them with Jean and the A.I. goddess then vanishes due to the cost of granting Teacher these new skills. However, a mysterious demonic voice then takes over for the A.I. goddess, having created her in the first place, but doesn't reveal its identity. The Lich's defeat destroys the dungeon, damaging the floating island. Teacher uses his new skills to stop the island's falling debris. With the Lich gone, Stephan disappears into the afterlife as he was created by the Lich, but not before handing over Nameless's diary. Back at Jean's house, following a meal made by Teacher and Bernard, Teacher studies the diary and learns how Nameless became the Lich and that he created the undead knight, the female undead, the Undead Eater, and Stephan, along with his motivations and secret wishes for Fran and Jean to survive. After Fran learns of this and following a week, she and Teacher part ways with Jean, who intends to let the guild know about what was written in the diary, and resume their journey to Port Dars.
18	6	"The Briny Beach Experience"	TBA	TBA	November 12, 2026
Fran, Teacher, and Jet finally reach the seaside town Port Dars. However, they are unable to find lodging due to all the inns already being booked by tourists for an upcoming Moons Festival. Fran, Teacher, and Jet instead spend most of the day playing at the beach, until they decide to check the port for anywhere to stay. They are quickly confronted by a pair of Blue Cats, and Fran quickly kills one and tortures the other, deducing that they are slavers who specialize in trafficking children. Upon finding out the location of their base, Fran ruthlessly kills all of the slavers and rescues the captured children, which includes Fult and Satya Phyllius, a prince and princess of the Phyllius Kingdom. Fran and Teacher then fight a newly arrived Dark Knight, only to find out he is Salut, Fult and Satya's bodyguard, who came here to rescue them. Despite their chamberlain Sellid's protests due to his discomfort of poor people and strangers, Fult and Satya invite Fran to stay at the inn they have rented out, which she gladly accepts and enjoys the baths and meals with Teacher, Jet, and the rescued children. Fult and Satya also make plans to send the children home while the orphans will work for them in the Phyllius Kingdom. Meanwhile, a masked figure lurks outside the inn, noting that his "targets" are inside.
19	7	"The Humongous Sea Monster"	TBA	TBA	November 19, 2026
The masked man, revealed to be an assassin, is after Fult and Satya, but Fran, Teacher, and Jet subdue him at the last second. Fran suspects that he is working with the Blue Cats. After the assassin unsuccessfully tries to cut himself free or commit suicide thanks to Teacher's magic, they interrogate him and learn that he isn't in league with the Blue Cats at all and bring him to Sulat, informing him of the assassin's plan. The next day, after eating a meal, Fult and Satya plan to go to Bulbola and then Ulmutt, and also hire Fran as their bodyguard despite concerns from Sellid. The group then board a large boat and travel to Bulbola where Fran, Teacher, and Jet defeat many sea monsters that attempt to attack the boat. Fran also goes fishing with Fult, Satya, and the other children, and Teacher turns into a fishing rod for her to use. She reels in and kills a big sea monster. While enjoying a meal, Fran meets Rengill, the ship's captain and a member of a large merchant guild called the Lucille Trade Association, who rewards her with a gold coin for her help. That night, the boat comes under attack by a magical beast called a Midgardsormr. Because the boat is unable to get away fast enough, Fran, Teacher, and Jet fight the monster, but it proves to be very powerful. Fran and Teacher use Death Gaze to attack it, but this also proves ineffective. Teacher eventually gets the idea to attack the monster from within by allowing it to swallow him and drops rubble from the floating island into its stomach before teleporting back out. Although this fails to kill the monster, Teacher's actions have stalled it long enough for the boat to get away. The next day, pirates approach the boat. During an argument, Sellid grows suspicious of Salut as he was thought to have left the Raydross Kingdom and believes that he is after an artifact called the Divine Sword. Fran and Teacher go to deal with the pirates.
20	8	"The Sea Nation is Complicated"	TBA	TBA	November 26, 2026
While fighting the pirates, Teacher warns Fran to not kill them. After defeating the pirates, they learn that the pirates are actually fisherman from a country called Seedrun, who fled their homeland and became pirates because they couldn't pay off their taxes. Their leader informs them that Sellimea, the princess of Seedrun, had gone missing and is rumored to have been killed. The group head to the pirates' hideout to find supplies. Reaching the hideout, a warship from Seedrun approaches the island. Dwight, the admiral of Seedrun's navy force, arrives to arrest the pirates along with the Phyllius crew, also revealing that Seedrun is no longer in league with Phyllius. Unable to reason with him, the group have no choice but to fight. Fran is subdued by Valuza, Dwight's second in command, forcing the group to surrender and they are taken prisoner. Teacher and the other swords are confiscated while the group are locked in cells. Teacher takes on a small form to sneak out and make his way back to Fran, where she at first mistakes him for an insect. Dwight prepares to have the Phyllius knights sold into slavery. Fran, Rengill's crew, and the children are rescued by a female warrior named Miriam Vermilion Seedrun, who is a princess of Seedrun, having been sent to rescue them by her sister Sellimea, who is actually still alive and the rumors about her being killed were false, having been spread by her evil brother Suarez, Seedrun's current king. Miriam leads them through a secret passage where they meet up with her ally Kara. They use carriages to escape to a secret hideout built by the original king, which Suarez doesn't know of. Here, Miriam brings Fran and Rengill to see Sellimea and reveals how powerful Fran is. As Fran talks to Miriam and Sellimea, she learns that Seedrun was founded by pirates and how Suarez took the throne, and that Julius, his uncle, has allied with him. Fran shows them the documents that she found in the Blue Cats' hideout that proves that the Blue Cats are working for Suarez and the Raydross Kingdom, and also learns of four Water Dragon Ships that were given to Suarez, Sellimea, Julius; and Suarez, Miriam, and Sellimea's cousin Gladio. The ships only obey their masters, but Sellimea's ship is unusable right now and Raydross wants those ships. Fran also learns that the Divine Sword that Sellid mentioned before can control demons. They are determined to prevent Seedrun and Raydross from forming an allegiance and rescue Fult and Satya. Miriam, Fran, Kara, and another ally named Bike plan to infiltrate the palace where Fult and Satya are being held. Yos, one of Phyllius's soldiers, helps them get into the palace and find Salut. However, Yos is killed by Valuza, who had been waiting for them.
21	9	"Rescue Gone Awry"	TBA	TBA	December 3, 2026

== Reception ==
Theron Martin of Anime News Network, in his review of the first volume of the light novel, praised the interactions between the two lead characters, and said: "Beyond the action scenes, Tanaka's writing skill is a little above average. Dialogue and character development flows smoothly and world-building, though somewhat limited, does fit with the perspective of the central characters." However, he criticized the story's lack of originality, noting its similarities to So I'm a Spider, So What?, That Time I Got Reincarnated as a Slime, and Reborn as a Vending Machine, I Now Wander the Dungeon.

== See also ==
- Mushi-Uta, another light novel series illustrated by the same illustrator
- Oreshura, another light novel series illustrated by the same illustrator
- Unbreakable Machine-Doll, another light novel series illustrated by the same illustrator
