= List of White Album episodes =

The cover of the Japanese edition of the first Blu-ray Disc compilation depicting Rina Ogata (left) and Yuki Morikawa (right).

This is a list of episodes of the 2009 Japanese animated television series White Album, based on the visual novel of the same name by Leaf. The episodes, produced by Seven Arcs, are directed by Akira Yoshimura, written by Hiroaki Satō, and features character design by Kō Yoshinari based on the original concept provided by Hisashi Kawata. The story follows Tōya Fujii, a college student, and his relationship with his romantic interest and idol singer Yuki Morikawa, as well as his interactions with Yuki's senior, Rina Ogata. The first thirteen episodes began its broadcast on January 3, 2009, on TV Kanagawa Japanese television network, and concluded on March 28. A second set of thirteen episodes was broadcast in Fall 2009. The episodes were also aired on later dates on TV Saitama, Chiba TV, KBS Kyoto, Nagoya Broadcasting Network, and the AT-X broadcasting networks.

Nine pieces of theme music were used for the episodes; two opening themes (also used as special endings), two ending themes and five insert songs. The opening themes are"Deep Love" (深愛, Shin'ai), sung by Japanese singer Nana Mizuki (eps 01–13, also ending of ep 13). and "Mugen (夢幻)", also by Nana Mizuki (eps 14 and after, also ending of ep 26) The ending themes are "Like Falling Snow" (舞い落ちる雪のように, Maiochiru Yuki no Yō ni), sung by the Japanese singer Suara and "Akai Ito (赤い糸)", also by Suara (eps 14–25). The insert songs are: "Garasu no Hana" (ガラスの華) by Nana Mizuki (ep 3), "Koiirozora" (恋色空) by Aya Hirano (ep 24), "POWDER SNOW" by Nana Mizuki & Aya Hirano (ep 26), "SOUND OF DESTINY" by Nana Mizuki and "WHITE ALBUM" by Aya Hirano. A singles for the first opening and ending theme were released in January 2009.

== Episode list ==
No.	Title	Original release date
1	"Right, From That Time On, The Switch is Turned On Already"; Transliteration: "Sō, Ano Toki wa Mō, Suicchi ga Haittetan ja nai kanā" (Japanese: そう、あの時はもう、スイッチが入ってたんじゃないかなあ)	January 3, 2009
Tōya Fujii wakes up to a television interview with his romantic interest and idol singer Yuki Morikawa, and laments the time they have to spend together. Later in the day Tōya has a conversation with Yuki, before she departs for work. At work, Rina Ogata finds Yuki has been bullied by an idol group. After Yuki resolves the problem, she calls Tōya on the phone before Rina catches her and expresses interest in seeing him.
2	"Do You Believe In Encounters Scheduled Long Before?"; Transliteration: "Zutto Mae kara Shikumareteta, Sonna Deaitte, Shinjiru?" (Japanese: ずっと前から仕組まれてた、そんな出会いって、信じる?)	January 10, 2009
After his conversation with Yuki on the phone, Tōya initially refuses, but later relents to accompany his childhood friend Haruka Kawashima on a walk. Meanwhile, Rina walks into her brother, Eiji Ogata's room, and finds Yuki in tears after their conversation. The next day, Yuki and Rina arrives at the café Echoes, Tōya's workplace. Rina then asks Tōya for his telephone number prior to her departure, and later calls him at night.
3	"Hand to Hand, Shoulder to Shoulder, Back to Back, And Then. It is Fine Even With Clothing."; Transliteration: "Te to Te, Kata to Kata, Senaka to Senaka, Sore kara. Fuku no Ue kara Datte Iin da" (Japanese: 手と手、肩と肩、背中と背中、それから。服の上からだっていいんだ)	January 17, 2009
At night, Rina calls Tōya on the phone and offers him a job to help her manager, which he accepts to meet Yuki. Later, Tōya receives a call from Yuki, who invites him on a date on Saturday. Tōya then asks Haruka to apply his university registration on that day and accepts the invitation. The following day, Tōya heads to work and finds he is promoted as Rina's assistant. Rina then admonishes Tōya and Yuki as an attempt to create time for the two. Later, Tōya receives calls and learns that his date is canceled and he is fired as Rina's assistant. He then accepts a job to become a tutor for Mana Mizuki, and arrives at Echoes and learns that it was Eiji Ogata who fired him.
4	"There are Times When We Feel We Understand Each Other Beyond Our Imaginations. The Opposite Happens Frequently Too."; Transliteration: "Sōzō o Koete Wakari Aeterutte, Kanjiru Toki ga Aru. Gyaku no Toki mo Ōi kedo ne" (Japanese: 想像を超えてわかり合えてるって、感じる時がある。逆の時も多いけどね)	January 24, 2009
Tōya awakes to a telephone call from Rina, who adjusts the meeting venue and time for his date with Yuki. The next day, Tōya arrives at Hotarugasaki Station, and meets Mana Mizuki, who is on her way to attend school. The two waits for Yuki and after a short while, Mana proposes to Tōya to wait for Yuki at Hotarugasaki Academy, their destination. At the meantime, Rina arrives at Yūnagi Station, where she adjusts the meeting venue to, but leaves after waiting for Tōya. Later, Yuki arrives at Hotarugasaki Station, and decides to look for Tōya elsewhere after awaiting him. At night, the two stumbles upon each other. Yuki then reveals to Tōya that she is granted a single release, and invites him into her apartment.
5	"The Obstacles are Not Always the Ones Close to Us. But the Less We Know the Person, The More Difficult It Is."; Transliteration: "Jama o Suru no ga, Chikashii Ningen Dake to wa Kagiranai. Shiranai Hito Hodo, Tekibishii" (Japanese: 邪魔をするのが、近しい人間だけとは限らない。知らない人ほど、手厳しい)	January 31, 2009
After spending the night at Yuki's apartment, Tōya accepts Yayoi Shinozuka's offer for transportation to home. Yayoi then offers Tōya to a movie and dinner, and attempts to seduces Tōya to break up with Yuki. Later, Misaki requests Tōya to provide an opinion on a manuscript she has written for a play. The next day, Tōya arrives in campus to meet Misaki. The theater club however, forcefully accepts Misaki's manuscript, and assigns her to create the materials needed before the conversation can take place. Later that night, Misaki, not knowing what to do, calls Tōya and requests his help.
6	"A Good Way to Forget Your Own Problems. How About Sticking Your Head into Other People's Troubles?"; Transliteration: "Nayami o Wasureru Ii Hōhō. Tanin no Toraburu ni Kubi o Tsukkonde Mirutte no wa, Dō?" (Japanese: 悩みを忘れるいい方法。他人のトラブルに首を突っ込んでみるってのは、どう?)	February 7, 2009
After Misaki pleads for help, Tōya offers to help her in preparing the materials needed for the play. The next day, as Tōya returns home, he finds Misaki waiting for him in front of his apartment, who wants him to offer feedback for her designs. While Misaki is asleep, Tōya looks over the designs and receives a telephone call from Yuki, who is in a recording session for a song. The next day, Tōya finds that Misaki's concepts has been accepted, and decides to help Misaki to buy and prepare the materials.
7	"An Image Must Always Be Built Upon. Because It is Something That Falls Apart From the Beginning."; Transliteration: "Imēji wa Dondon Kōchiku Shinakya. Tada de Sae, Hashi Kara Kuzureteku Mono Nan Dakara" (Japanese: イメージはどんどん構築しなきゃ。ただでさえ、端から崩れてくものなんだから)	February 14, 2009
At night, Yuki finishes the recording session for her single, while Misaki moves into Tōya's father's house in order to prepare for her materials for the play. The following day, Tōya again heads to work as a tutor, and is surprised to find Mana as his student, whom he mistaken as her sister. Afterwards, Tōya and Misaki heads to Echoes to have dinner. Rina later comes in and mistakes Tōya and Misaki in a relationship. Eiji then takes Tōya and Rina to a recording session, while Tōya attempts to explain for the misunderstanding.
8	"The Less Time We Have, the More We Accomplish, the More We End Up Doing. Love is the Same."; Transliteration: "Jikan ga Nai Toki Hodo, Ōku no Koto ga Dekiru. Yatte Shimau. Mochiron, Koi Datte" (Japanese: 時間がないときほど、多くのことができる。やってしまう。もちろん、恋だって)	February 21, 2009
9	"There's No Need for Clever Scenarios in Memories. The Second They Come Out, Everyone Speaks Nonsense of Them."; Transliteration: "Omoide ni Ki no Kiita Shinario wa Iranai. Kuchi kara Deta Shunkan, Dōse Minna Tawagoto" (Japanese: 思い出に気の利いたシナリオは要らない。口から出た瞬間、どうせみんなたわ言)	February 28, 2009
10	"The reason a one person fight feels hollow isn`t just because it's one person. The eyes of the audience hurt." Transliteration: "Hitori Zumō ga Munashii no wa, Hitori Dakara tte dake ja Nai. Kankyaku no Me ga, Itain da" (Japanese: 一人相撲が虚しいのは、一人だからってだけじゃない。観客の目が、痛いんだ)	March 7, 2009
11	"Time Does Not Solve the Thorns In Our Heart. It Just Puts A Label of Oblivion On It."; Transliteration: "Mune ni Tsukaete Iru Koto o, Toki wa Kaiketsu Shite Kurenai. Bōkyaku no Raberu o Haru dake de" (Japanese: 胸につかえていることを、時は解決してくれない。忘却のラベルを貼るだけで)	March 14, 2009
12	"To bind. To deceive. To take away. To give. What's most painful is to wait." Transliteration: "Shibaru Koto. Azamuku Koto. Ubau Koto. Ataeru Koto. Dore yori Tsurai no ga, Matsu Koto" (Japanese: 縛ること。欺くこと。奪うこと。与えること。どれより辛いのが、待つこと)	March 21, 2009
13	"The vase was leaning toward one side, yet you didn`t notice? Because there was not even a drop of water left." Transliteration: "Utsuwa ga Katamuiteru no ni, Kizukanakatta? Mizu wa Mō Itteki mo Nokotte Nakatta kara ne" (Japanese: 器が傾いてるのに、気づかなかった？水はもう一滴も残ってなかったからね)	March 28, 2009
14	"There was never an instance where the tuning matched. I have come to think that there exists a better spot out there." Transliteration: "Chūningu ga atta tameshi ga nai. Motto ryōkō na basho ga aru to omotteshimau" (Japanese: チューニングが合ったためしがない。もっと良好な場所があると思ってしまう)	October 2, 2009
15	"The things hidden from view are destroying everything around it. Since it was never there, nothing can be done to deal with it." Transliteration: "Mitsukaranai mono ga, mawari wo kowasu. Sore ni nai kara, te wo uchiyō ga nai" (Japanese: 見つからないものが、まわりを壊す。そこにないから、手の打ちようがない)	October 9, 2009
16	"I do writhe in embarrassment when I reminisce my childhood. Moreover so if I make comparisons." Transliteration: "Chīsai koro wo omotte, hazukashisa ni mimodae suru koto ga aru. Sore ni kurebereba" (Japanese: 小さい頃を想って、恥ずかしさに身悶えすることがある。それに比べれば)	October 16, 2009
17	"I have lies that I want to expose. I have truths that I do not wish to believe. I have one of these each." Transliteration: "Baretehoshī uso ga aru. Shinjitehoshikunai hontō ga aru. Hitotsu zutsu, aru" (Japanese: バレてほしい嘘がある。信じてほしくないホントウがある。一つずつ、ある)	October 23, 2009
18	"Aren't you taking too much for granted? Complaining that you are claustrophobic while you are hiding in your own shell." Transliteration: "Mushi ga yosugirun janai? Kara ni tojikomotteru kuse ni, heishokyōbushō nante" (Japanese: 虫が良すぎるんじゃない？殻に閉じこもってるくせに、閉所恐怖症なんて)	October 30, 2009
19	"I move on as I am losing interest. Most of the time though, I seem to have already lost interest before I move on." Transliteration: "Akiru kara tsugi ni susumeru to iu. Taitei wa, susumeru mae ni mou akiteru mitai dakedo" (Japanese: 飽きるから次に進めるという。大抵は、進む前にもう飽きてるみたいだけど)	November 6, 2009
20	"Love is beyond reason. Lovers who say this to one another are poets, critics, philosophers." Transliteration: "Ren'ai wa rikutsu janai. Sō takariau koibito-tachi wa, shijin, hyōronka, tetsugakusha" (Japanese: 恋愛は理屈じゃない。そう語り合う恋人達は、詩人、評論家、哲学者)	November 13, 2009
21	"I think I want to return to the crossroad. Would have been better if I had chosen the right one. That journey filled only with regret." Transliteration: "Wakaremichi made modoritai to omou. Migi ni sureba yokatta tte. Kōkai dake no sonna michinori" (Japanese: 別れ道まで戻りたいと思う。右にすれば良かったって。後悔だけのそんな道程)	November 20, 2009
22	"Having troubles expressing yourself? Try to strike a conversation with your eyes and you'll soon find yourself in the mood for a chat." Transliteration: "Kuchibeta de nayanderu? Me de kaiwa shitemiru to ii, sugu ni shaberitakunaru kara" (Japanese: 口べたで悩んでる？目で会話してみるといい、すぐにしゃべりたくなるから)	November 27, 2009
23	"I have come to desire catching a cold in anticipation of the nursing and the home-cooked dishes. I didn't include the later part suffering in my imagination at all." Transliteration: "Kanbyō ya teryōri wo kitai shite, kaze wo hikitakunaru. Ato no kurushimi wa sōzō mo shinai" (Japanese: 看病や手料理を期待して、風邪をひきたくなる。後の苦しみは想像もしない)	December 4, 2009
24	"Nightfall did not bring about anything at all. It was the fault of the sun that the colors faded." Transliteration: "Yoru wa nani mo shitekurenai yo. Iroaseru no wa taiyō no sei da shi" (Japanese: 夜は何もしてくれないよ。色あせるのは太陽のせいだし)	December 11, 2009
25	"It's the fault of others. I'm not at fault. All the fault lies in others. Only I myself am―" Transliteration: "Tanin ga warui. Jibun wa warukunai. Tanin dake ga warui. Jibun dake ga―" (Japanese: 他人が悪い。自分は悪くない。他人だけが悪い。自分だけが―)	December 18, 2009
26	"We sit together now, and all night long we have not stirred." Transliteration: "Bokutachi wa issho ni suwatteiru, hitobanchū, ugoku koto mo naku" (Japanese: 僕達は一緒に座っている、一晩中、動くこともなく)	December 25, 2009
