= Shinji Ishihira =

Japanese anime director

- 石平信司
- Occupation: Anime director
- Years active: 2002–present
- Known for: Fairy Tail, Log Horizon

Shinji Ishihira (Japanese: 石平信司, Hepburn: Ishihira Shinji) is a Japanese anime director. In 2002, Ishihira was put in charge of directing an anime for the first time with Ichi the Killer: Episode 0. Since then, some of the series he has directed include Fairy Tail and Log Horizon.

== Biography ==
Ishihira started out by doing scenarios for both anime and video games. However, he later decided to focus solely on the former. In 2002, Ishihira was put in charge of directing an anime series for the first time with Ichi the Killer: Episode 0. In 2007, he was put in charge of directing for his first TV series, Tokyo Majin.

In 2009, Ishihira directed the anime adaptation of Fairy Tail, which garnered a positive response from critics. In Southeast Asia, it won Animax Asia's Anime of the Year award in 2010. In 2012, the series won the Meilleur Anime Japonais (best Japanese anime) award at the 19th Anime & Manga Grand Prix in Paris, France. In 2021, he directed the anime adaptation of Tsukimichi: Moonlit Fantasy, which has the highest overseas sales record among all Nippon TV anime.

== Works ==
=== TV series ===
- Tokyo Majin (2007) (director)
- Fairy Tail (2009–2019) (director)
- Log Horizon (2013–2021) (director)
- Super Lovers (2016–2017) (director)
- The Seven Heavenly Virtues (2018) (director)
- Talentless Nana (2020) (director)
- Edens Zero (2021–2023) (chief director)
- Tsukimichi: Moonlit Fantasy (2021–present) (director)
- Sasaki and Miyano (2022) (director)
- Reincarnated as a Sword (2022–present) (director)
- Welcome Home (2024) (director)
- Fairy Tail: 100 Years Quest (2024) (chief director)
- Farmagia (2025) (chief director)
- The Other World's Books Depend on the Bean Counter (2026) (director)
- Heroine? Saint? No, I'm an All-Works Maid (and Proud of It)! (2026) (chief director)

=== Original video animation ===
- Ichi the Killer: Episode 0 (2002) (director)
- Tenbatsu! Angel Rabbie (2004) (director)
- Air Gear: Break on the Sky (2010–2011) (director)
- Sasaki and Miyano (2022) (director)

=== Films ===
- Sasaki and Miyano: Graduation (2023) (director)
