= 2019 in anime =

Events in 2019 in anime. The first year of the Reiwa era.

== Releases ==
=== Films ===
A list of anime that debuted in theaters between January 1 and December 31, 2019.

Release date	Title	Studio	Director(s)	Running time (minutes)	Ref
January 4	Love Live! Sunshine!! The School Idol Movie Over the Rainbow	Sunrise	Kazuo Sakai	100	
January 4	Made in Abyss: Journey's Dawn	Kinema Citrus	Masayuki Kojima	119	
January 12	Fate/stay night: Heaven's Feel II. lost butterfly	Ufotable	Tomonori Sudō	117	
January 18	Made in Abyss: Wandering Twilight	Kinema Citrus	Masayuki Kojima	108	
January 25	Even if the World Will End Tomorrow	Craftar	Yūhei Sakuragi	95	
January 25 – March 8	Psycho-Pass: Sinners of the System	Production I.G	Naoyoshi Shiotani		
February 8	City Hunter the Movie: Shinjuku Private Eyes	Sunrise	Kenji Kodama	95	
February 8	The Saga of Tanya the Evil	NUT	Yutaka Uemura	115	
February 9	Code Geass: Lelouch of the Re;surrection	Sunrise	Gorō Taniguchi	114	
February 15	Is It Wrong to Try to Pick Up Girls in a Dungeon?: Arrow of the Orion	J.C.Staff	Katsushi Sakurabi	82	
February 16	The Royal Tutor	Tear Studio	Katsuya Kikuchi	60	
March 1	Doraemon: Nobita's Chronicle of the Moon Exploration	Shin-Ei Animation	Shinnosuke Yakuwa	111	
March 2 – May 4	King of Prism: Shiny Seven Stars	Tatsunoko Production	Masakazu Hishida		
March 15	Grisaia: Phantom Trigger the Animation	Bibury Animation Studio	Tensho	90	
March 15	Mr. Osomatsu: The Movie	Pierrot	Yoichi Fujita	108	
March 29	Trinity Seven: Heavens Library & Crimson Lord	Seven Arcs Pictures	Hiroshi Nishikiori	60	
April 5	Laidbackers	Studio Gokumi	Kiyomitsu Sato; Hiroyuki Hashimoto	59	
April 12	Detective Conan: The Fist of Blue Sapphire	TMS Entertainment	Tomoka Nagaoka	109	
April 19	Crayon Shin-chan: Honeymoon Hurricane ~The Lost Hiroshi~	Shin-Ei Animation	Masakazu Hashimoto		
April 19	Sound! Euphonium: The Movie – Our Promise: A Brand New Day	Kyoto Animation	Tatsuya Ishihara	100	
April 26	The Wonderland	Signal.MD	Keiichi Hara	115	
May 10	Kabaneri of the Iron Fortress: The Battle of Unato	Wit Studio	Tetsurō Araki	82	
May 17 – November 5, 2021	Fafner in the Azure: The Beyond	IG Zwei	Takashi Noto		
May 24	Promare	Trigger	Hiroyuki Imaishi	111	
May 31	Fujiko Mine's Lie	Telecom Animation Film	Takeshi Koike	57	
June 7	Children of the Sea	Studio 4°C	Ayumu Watanabe	111	
June 14	For Whom The Alchemist Exists	Satelight	Shōji Kawamori; Masanori Takahashi	118	
June 14	Uta no Prince-sama: Maji Love Kingdom	A-1 Pictures	Takeshi Furuta; Tomoka Nagaoka	84	
June 15	Girls und Panzer das Finale: Part 2	Actas	Tsutomu Mizushima	54	
June 15	Rascal Does Not Dream of a Dreaming Girl	CloverWorks	Sōichi Masui	89	
June 21	Ride Your Wave	Science SARU	Masaaki Yuasa	96	
June 29	Cencoroll 2	Anime Innovation Tokyo	Atsuya Uki	25	
June 29	Frame Arms Girl: Kyakkyau Fufu na Wonderland	Zexcs; Studio A-Cat	Keiichiro Kawaguchi	82	
July 5	Free! Road to the World – Dream	Kyoto Animation	Eisaku Kawanami	120	
July 12	Mewtwo Strikes Back: Evolution	OLM	Kunihiko Yuyama; Motonori Sakakibara	98	
July 19	Weathering with You	CoMix Wave Films	Makoto Shinkai	114	
August 2	Dragon Quest: Your Story	Shirogumi	Takashi Yamazaki; Ryūichi Yagi; Makoto Hanabusa	102	
August 9	One Piece: Stampede	Toei Animation	Takashi Otsuka	101	
August 21	Shimajiro to Ururu no Heroland	Benesse Corporation	Takamitsu Kawamura, Ryoji Aoki	58	
August 23	Ni no Kuni	OLM	Yoshiyuki Momose	106	
August 30	KonoSuba: God's Blessing on this Wonderful World! Crimson Legend	J.C.Staff	Takaomi Kanasaki	90	
September 6	Violet Evergarden: Eternity and the Auto Memory Doll	Kyoto Animation	Haruka Fujita	90	
September 13	BanG Dream! Film Live	Sanzigen	Tomomi Umetsu	72	
September 20	Hello World	Graphinica	Tomohiko Itō	100	
September 27 – November 29	The Legend of the Galactic Heroes: Die Neue These Seiran	Production I.G	Shunsuke Tada		
October 5	Blackfox	3Hz	Kazuya Nomura; Keisuke Shinohara	90	
October 11	Her Blue Sky	CloverWorks	Tatsuyuki Nagai	108	
October 22	Human Lost	Polygon Pictures	Katsuyuki Motohiro; Fuminori Kizaki	110	
October 25	Kimi dake ni Motetainda	Signal.MD	Shun Kudō	54	
October 26	Saekano the Movie: Finale	CloverWorks	Kanta Kamei (Chief); Akihisa Shibata	116	
December 13	Seven Days War	Ajia-do Animation Works	Yūta Murano	87	
December 20	My Hero Academia: Heroes Rising	Bones	Kenji Nagasaki	104	

=== Television series ===
A list of anime television series that debuted between January 1 and December 31, 2019.

First run start and end dates	Title	Episodes	Studio	Director(s)	Original title	Ref
January 3 – March 28	BanG Dream! (season 2)	13	Sanzigen	Kōdai Kakimoto		
January 4 – March 29	Boogiepop and Others	18	Madhouse	Shingo Natsume	Boogiepop wa Warawanai	
January 4 – March 22	The Price of Smiles	12	Tatsunoko Production	Toshimasa Suzuki	Egao no Daika	
January 5 – March 30	The Morose Mononokean (season 2)	13	Pierrot+	Itsuro Kawasaki	Fukigen na Mononokean	
January 5 – March 30	W'z	13	GoHands	Shingo Suzuki; Hiromitsu Kanazawa		
January 6 – March 24	How Clumsy you are, Miss Ueno	12	Lesprit	Tomohiro Yamanashi	Ueno-san wa Bukiyō	
January 7 – June 24	Dororo	24	MAPPA; Tezuka Productions	Kazuhiro Furuhashi		
January 7 – April 1	Mob Psycho 100 II	13	Bones	Yuzuru Tachikawa		
January 8 – March 26	Circlet Princess	12	Silver Link	Hideki Tachibana		
January 8 – March 26	Kakegurui ××	12	MAPPA	Yuichiro Hayashi; Kiyoshi Matsuda		
January 8 – March 26	Pastel Memories	12	Project No.9	Yasuyuki Shinozaki		
January 8 – March 26	Rainy Cocoa side G	12	EMT Squared	Hisashi Ishii		
January 8 – March 26	Real Girl (season 2)	12	Hoods Entertainment	Takashi Naoya		
January 8 – March 26	Rinshi!! Ekoda-chan	12	Creators in Pack (#2, 5); Ascension (#3); Zero-G (#4)			
January 8 – March 26	Wataten!: An Angel Flew Down to Me	12	Doga Kobo	Daisuke Hiramaki	Watashi ni Tenshi ga Maiorita!	
January 9 – March 27	Kemurikusa	12	Yaoyorozu	Tatsuki		
January 9 – March 27	Meiji Tokyo Renka	12	TMS/V1 Studio	Akitaro Daichi		
January 9 – March 27	My Roommate Is a Cat	12	Zero-G	Kaoru Suzuki	Dōkyonin wa Hiza, Tokidoki, Atama no Ue.	
January 9 – June 26	The Rising of the Shield Hero	25	Kinema Citrus	Takao Abo	Tate no Yūsha no Nariagari	
January 10 – March 28	Dimension High School	12	Asmik Ace; Polygon Magic	Yuichi Abe	Chō Jigen Kakumei Anime: Dimension Hai Sukūru	(Note: Live action / 3DCG anime hybrid series.)
January 10 – March 28	Girly Air Force	12	Satelight	Katsumi Ono		
January 10 – March 28	Grimms Notes the Animation	12	Brain's Base	Seiki Sugawara		
January 10 – March 28	Revisions	12	Shirogumi	Gorō Taniguchi		
January 10 – March 28	The Quintessential Quintuplets	12	Tezuka Productions	Satoshi Kuwabara	5-Tōbun no Hanayome	
January 11 – March 29	B-Project: Zecchō Emotion	12	BN Pictures	Makoto Moriwaki		
January 11 – March 29	Date A Live III	12	J.C.Staff	Keitaro Motonaga		
January 11 – March 29	Hulaing Babies	12	Gaina	Yoshinori Asao		
January 11 – March 29	The Promised Neverland	12	CloverWorks	Mamoru Kanbe	Yakusoku no Neverland	
January 12 – March 30	Bermuda Triangle: Colorful Pastrale	12	Seven Arcs Pictures	Junji Nishimura		
January 12 – March 30	Domestic Girlfriend	12	Diomedéa	Shōta Ihata	Domestic na Kanojo	
January 12 – March 30	Endro!	12	Studio Gokumi	Kaori		
January 12 – March 30	Kaguya-sama: Love Is War	12	A-1 Pictures	Mamoru Hatakeyama	Kaguya-sama wa Kokurasetai: Tensai-tachi no Renai Zunōsen	
January 12 – March 30	Magical Girl Spec-Ops Asuka	12	Liden Films	Hideyo Yamamoto	Mahō Shōjo Tokushusen Asuka	
January 12 – March 16	Mini Toji	10	Project No.9	Yuu Nobuta		
January 13 – March 31	The Magnificent Kotobuki	12	GEMBA	Tsutomu Mizushima	Kōya no Kotobuki Hikōtai	
January 14 – April 1	Kemono Friends (season 2)	12	Tomason	Ryuichi Kimura		
January 20 – March 24	Mysteria Friends	10	CygamesPictures	Hideki Okamoto	Manaria Friends	
January 27 – April 14	Forest of Piano (season 2)	12	Gaina	Hiroyuki Yamaga	Piano no Mori	
February 3 – January 26, 2020	Star Twinkle PreCure	49	Toei Animation	Hiroaki Miyamoto		
April 2 – March 31, 2020	Ace of Diamond Act II	52	Madhouse	Mitsuyuki Masuhara	Daiya no Ēsu	
April 2 – October 1	YU-NO: A Girl Who Chants Love at the Bound of this World	26	Feel	Tetsuo Hirakawa	Kono yo no hate de koi o utau Shōjo YU-NO	
April 4 – June 20	Bakumatsu Crisis	12	Studio Deen	Mitsutoshi Satō		
April 4 – June 27	Million Arthur (season 2)	13	J.C.Staff	Yōhei Suzuki	Operation Han-Gyaku-Sei Million Arthur	
April 4 – June 20	Yatogame-chan Kansatsu Nikki	12	Saetta	Hisayoshi Hirasawa		
April 5 – June 21	Hitori Bocchi no Marumaru Seikatsu	12	C2C	Takebumi Anzai		
April 6 – June 22	Ao-chan Can't Study!	12	Silver Link	Keisuke Inoue	Midara na Ao-chan wa Benkyō ga Dekinai	
April 6 – September 28	Demon Slayer: Kimetsu no Yaiba	26	Ufotable	Haruo Sotozaki	Kimetsu no Yaiba	
April 6 – September 21	Fruits Basket	25	TMS/8PAN	Yoshihide Ibata		
April 6 – June 22	Joshi Kausei	12	Seven	Tadayoshi Sasaki		
April 6 – June 29	Kono Oto Tomare! Sounds of Life	13	Platinum Vision	Ryōma Mizuno	Kono Oto Tomare!	
April 6 – September 28	Mix	24	OLM	Odahiro Watanabe		
April 6 – June 22	Nobunaga teacher's young bride	12	Seven	Tadayoshi Sasaki	Nobunaga Sensei no Osanazuma	
April 6 – June 22	Over Drive Girl 1/6	12	Studio A-Cat	Keitaro Motonaga	Chō Kadō Gāru 1/6	
April 6 – June 22	Senryu Girl	12	Connect	Masato Jinbo	Senryū Shōjo	
April 7 – June 23	Afterlost	12	Madhouse	Shigeyuki Miya	Shōmetsu Toshi	
April 7 – June 23	Fairy Gone	12	P.A. Works	Kenichi Suzuki		
April 7 – July 7	Hachigatsu no Cinderella Nine	12	TMS Entertainment	Susumu Kudo		
April 7 – June 23	Midnight Occult Civil Servants	12	Liden Films	Tetsuya Watanabe	Mayonaka no Occult Kōmuin	
April 7 – June 30	Ultramarine Magmell	13	Pierrot+	Hayato Date	Gunjō no Magmell	
April 7 – June 30	We Never Learn: BOKUBEN	13	Studio Silver; Arvo Animation	Yoshiaki Iwasaki	Bokutachi wa Benkyō ga Dekinai	
April 8 – March 23, 2020	I'm From Japan	50	ODDJOB	Isamu Ueno	Jimoto ga Japan	
April 8 – June 24	Namu Amida Butsu! -Rendai Utena-	12	Asahi Production	Akira Oguro		
April 8 – June 24	RobiHachi	12	Studio Comet	Shinji Takamatsu		
April 8 – June 24	Why the Hell are You Here, Teacher!?	12	Tear Studio	Hiraku Kaneko (Chief); Toshikatsu Tokoro	Nande Koko ni Sensei ga!?	
April 9 – June 25	Isekai Quartet	12	Studio Puyukai	Minoru Ashina		
April 9 – July 2	One-Punch Man (season 2)	12	J.C.Staff	Chikara Sakurai		
April 9 – June 25	Strike Witches: 501st Joint Fighter Wing Take Off!	12	acca effe Giga Production	Fumio Ito	World Witches Series 501 Butai Hasshinshimasu!	
April 10 – October 2	Carole & Tuesday	24	Bones	Shinichirō Watanabe (Chief); Motonobu Hori		
April 10 – June 26	The Helpful Fox Senko-san	12	Doga Kobo	Tomoaki Koshida	Sewayaki Kitsune no Senko-san	
April 10 – June 26	Wise Man's Grandchild	12	Silver Link	Masafumi Tamura	Kenja no Mago	
April 11 – June 20	Sarazanmai	11	MAPPA; Lapin Track	Nobuyuki Takeuchi (Chief); Kunihiko Ikuhara		
April 12 – June 28	Bungo Stray Dogs (season 3)	12	Bones	Takuya Igarashi		
April 15 – July 1	King of Prism: Shiny Seven Stars	12	Tatsunoko Production	Masakazu Hishida		
April 29 – July 1	Attack on Titan (season 3, part 2)	10	Wit Studio	Tetsurō Araki; Masashi Koizuka	Shingeki no Kyojin	
July 1 – September 16	Star-Myu (season 3)	12	C-Station	Shunsuke Tada		
July 1 – September 16	To the Abandoned Sacred Beasts	12	MAPPA	Jun Shishido	Katsute Kami Datta Kemono-tachi e	
July 2 – September 17	Are You Lost?	12	Ezo'la	Nobuyoshi Nagayama	Sōnan desu ka?	
July 2 – September 17	Magical Sempai	12	Liden Films	Fumiaki Usui	Tejina Senpai	
July 3 – September 18	Astra Lost in Space	12	Lerche	Masaomi Andō	Kanata no Asutora	
July 3 – September 18	How Heavy Are the Dumbbells You Lift?	12	Doga Kobo	Mitsue Yamazaki	Dumbbell Nan-Kilo Moteru?	
July 4 – September 19	Demon Lord, Retry!	12	Ekachi Epilka	Hiroshi Kimura	Maō-sama, Ritorai!	
July 4 – September 19	If It's for My Daughter, I'd Even Defeat a Demon Lord	12	Maho Film	Takeyuki Yanase	Uchi no Ko no Tame Naraba, Ore wa Moshikashitara Maō mo Taoseru Kamoshirenai.	
July 5 – December 13	Dr. Stone	24	TMS/8PAN	Shinya Iino		
July 5 – December 27	Fire Force	24	David Production	Yuki Yase	En'en no Shōbōtai	
July 5 – September 26	Granbelm	13	Nexus	Masaharu Watanabe		
July 5 – September 20	O Maidens in Your Savage Season	12	Lay-duce	Masahiro Ando; Takurō Tsukada	Araburu Kisetsu no Otome-domo yo	
July 5 – September 20	Wasteful Days of High School Girls	12	Passione	Takeo Takahashi (Chief); Hijiri Sanpei	Joshi Kōsei no Mudazukai	
July 6 – September 28	Senki Zesshō Symphogear XV	13	Satelight	Katsumi Ono		
July 6 – September 28	The Case Files of Lord El-Melloi II: Rail Zeppelin Grace Note	13	Troyca	Makoto Katō	Rōdo Erumeroi II-sei no Jikenbo	
July 7 – August 11	Business Fish	12	IANDA	Takashi Sumida		
July 7 – December 22	Ensemble Stars!	24	David Production	Yasufumi Soejima; Masakazu Hishida		
July 7 – September 29	Re:Stage! Dream Days♪	12	Yumeta Company; Graphinica	Shin Katagai		
July 7 – September 22	Teasing Master Takagi-san (season 2)	12	Shin-Ei Animation	Hiroaki Akagi	Karakai Jōzu no Takagi-san	
July 7 – September 22	The Ones Within	12	Silver Link	Shin Ōnuma	Naka no Hito Genome [Jikkyōchū]	
July 7 – December 29	Vinland Saga	24	Wit Studio	Shuhei Yabuta		
July 8 – October 7	Arifureta: From Commonplace to World's Strongest	13	White Fox; Asread	Kinji Yoshimoto	Arifureta Shokugyō de Sekai Saikyō	
July 8 – September 30	Cop Craft	12	Millepensee	Shin Itagaki		
July 8 – September 1	Fire in His Fingertips: My Childhood Friend is a Firefighter	8	Studio Hōkiboshi	Toshihiro Watase	Yubisaki kara Honki no Netsujō: Osana Najimi wa Shōbōshi	
July 8 – September 23	Hensuki: Are You Willing to Fall in Love with a Pervert, as Long as She's a Cutie?	12	Geek Toys	Itsuki Imazaki	Kawaikereba Hentai demo Suki ni Natte Kuremasuka?	
July 8 – September 23	Kochoki: Wakaki Nobunaga	12	Studio Deen	Noriyuki Abe		
July 10 – September 25	Isekai Cheat Magician	12	Encourage Films	Daisuke Tsukushi		
July 11 – September 19	Given	11	Lerche	Hikaru Yamaguchi		
July 12 – September 27	A Certain Scientific Accelerator	12	J.C.Staff	Nobuharu Kamanaka	Toaru Kagaku no Accelerator	
July 12 – September 27	The Demon Girl Next Door	12	J.C.Staff	Hiroaki Sakurai	Machikado Mazoku	
July 13 – September 28	Do You Love Your Mom and Her Two-Hit Multi-Target Attacks?	12	J.C.Staff	Yoshiaki Iwasaki	Tsūjou Kōgeki ga Zentai Kōgeki de ni Kai Kōgeki no Okā-san wa Suki Desuka?	
July 13 – September 28	Is It Wrong to Try to Pick Up Girls in a Dungeon? (season 2)	12	J.C.Staff	Hideki Tachibana	Dungeon ni Deai o Motomeru no wa Machigatteiru Darō ka?	
July 14 – October 13	BEM	12	LandQ Studios	Yoshinori Odaka		
July 30 – October 15	Try Knights	12	Gonzo	Tadayoshi Sasaki		
October 1 – December 24	Bananya and the Curious Bunch	13	Gathering	Kyō Yatate	Bananya: Fushigi na Nakamatachi	
October 2 – December 18	After School Dice Club	12	Liden Films	Kenichi Imaizumi	Hōkago Saikoro Kurabu	
October 2 – September 30, 2020	Ahiru no Sora	50	Diomedéa	Keizō Kusakawa (Chief); Shingo Tamaki		
October 2 – December 27	Cautious Hero: The Hero Is Overpowered but Overly Cautious	12	White Fox	Masayuki Sakoi	Kono Yūsha ga Ore Tsuē Kuse ni Shinchō Sugiru	
October 2 – December 18	Kemono Michi: Rise Up	12	ENGI	Kazuya Miura	Hataage! Kemonomichi	
October 2 – December 25	Oresuki	12	Connect	Noriaki Akitaya	Ore o Suki nano wa Omae dake kayo	
October 2 – February 26, 2020	Radiant (season 2)	21	Lerche	Daisei Fukuoka; Seiji Kishi		
October 3 – December 26	Ascendance of a Bookworm	14	Ajia-do Animation Works	Mitsuru Hongo	Honzuki no Gekokujō: Shisho ni Naru Tame niwa Shudan o Erandeiraremasen	
October 3 – March 20, 2020	Azur Lane	12	Bibury Animation Studio	Tensho		
October 3 – December 19	High School Prodigies Have It Easy Even In Another World	12	Project No.9	Shinsuke Yanagi	Chōjin-Kokoseitachi wa Isekai demo Yoyu de Ikinuku Yōdesu!	
October 4 – December 27	Granblue Fantasy The Animation (season 2)	12	MAPPA	Yui Umemoto		
October 4 – December 13	Young Disease Outburst Boy	11	Studio Deen	Kazuya Ichikawa	Chūbyō Gekihatsu Boy	
October 4 – October 16, 2020	Zoids Wild Zero	50	OLM	Takao Kato		
October 5 – March 28, 2020	Aikatsu on Parade!	25	BN Pictures	Shishō Igarashi		
October 5 – March 21, 2020	Fate/Grand Order - Absolute Demonic Front: Babylonia	21	CloverWorks	Toshifumi Akai	Fate/Grand Order: Zettai Majū Sensen Babylonia	
October 5 – December 28	Kono Oto Tomare! Sounds of Life (season 2)	13	Platinum Vision	Ryōma Mizuno	Kono Oto Tomare!	
October 5 – December 21	Val × Love	12	Hoods Entertainment	Takashi Naoya		
October 5 – March 7, 2020	Welcome to Demon School! Iruma-kun	23	BN Pictures	Makoto Moriwaki	Mairimashita! Iruma-kun	
October 6 – December 22	Actors: Songs Connection	12	Drive	Osamu Yamasaki		
October 6 – December 22	African Office Worker	12	Hotzipang	Tetsuya Tatamitani	Africa no Sararīman	
October 6 – January 27, 2020	Babylon	12	Revoroot	Kiyotaka Suzuki		
October 6 – December 22	Fairy Gone (season 2)	12	P.A. Works	Kenichi Suzuki		
October 6 – December 29	Special 7: Special Crime Investigation Unit	12	ANIMA&CO.	Takayuki Kuriyama (Chief); Harume Kosaka	Keishichou Tokumu-bu Tokushu Kyouaku-han Taisaku-Shitsu Dai-Nana-ka -Tokunana-	
October 6 – December 29	We Never Learn: BOKUBEN (season 2)	13	Studio Silver; Arvo Animation	Yoshiaki Iwasaki	Bokutachi wa Benkyō ga Dekinai	
October 7 – December 23	Didn't I Say to Make My Abilities Average in the Next Life?!	12	Project No.9	Masahiko Ohta	Watashi, Nōryoku wa Heikinchi de tte Itta yo ne!	
October 7 – March 30, 2020	Phantasy Star Online 2: Episode Oracle	25	Gonzo	Masaki Tachibana		
October 7 – December 23	Stand My Heroes: Piece of Truth	12	M.S.C	Hideyo Yamamoto		
October 8 – January 7, 2020	Kandagawa Jet Girls	12	TNK	Hiraku Kaneko		
October 8 – December 24	Z/X Code reunion	12	Passione	Yoshifumi Sueda		
October 9 – March 25, 2020	The Seven Deadly Sins: Wrath of the Gods	24	Studio Deen	Susumu Nishizawa	Nanatsu no Taizai: Kamigami no Gekirin	
October 10 – December 26	Assassins Pride	12	EMT Squared	Kazuya Aiura		
October 10 – December 26	Beastars	12	Orange	Shin'ichi Matsumi		
October 10 – December 26	No Guns Life (part 1)	12	Madhouse	Naoyuki Itō		
October 10 – December 26	Stars Align	12	Eight Bit	Kazuki Akane	Hoshiai no Sora	
October 11 – March 27, 2020	Case File nº221: Kabukicho	24	Production I.G	Ai Yoshimura	Kabukichō Syarokku	
October 11 – December 27	True Cooking Master Boy	12	NAS	Itsuro Kawasaki	Shin Chūka Ichiban!	
October 12 – December 28	Food Wars! Shokugeki no Soma: The Fourth Plate	12	J.C.Staff	Yoshitomo Yonetani	Shokugeki no Sōma: Shin no Sara	
October 12 – April 4, 2020	My Hero Academia (season 4)	25	Bones	Kenji Nagasaki (Chief); Masahiro Mukai	Boku no Hero Academia 4	
October 13 – January 18, 2020	Chidori RSC	12	3Hz	Masanori Takahashi		
October 13 – December 29	Sword Art Online: Alicization – War of Underworld (part 1)	12	A-1 Pictures	Manabu Ono		
October 13 – December 29	Tenka Hyakken ~Meiji-kan e Yōkoso!~	12	Liden Films	Daisuke Hashimoto		
October 22 – March 24, 2020	Chihayafuru (season 3)	24	Madhouse	Morio Asaka		
October 24 – December 12	Psycho-Pass (season 3)	8	Production I.G	Naoyoshi Shiotani		
October 25 – December 20	Hi Score Girl (season 2)	9	Shogakukan Music & Digital Entertainment	Yoshiki Yamakawa		

=== Original net animations ===
A list of original net animations that debuted between January 1 and December 31, 2019.

First run start and end dates	Title	Episodes	Studio	Director(s)	Original title	Ref
January 17	Ikebukuro	1	Shaft	Yukio Takatsu		
February 14 – August 8	Fight League: Gear Gadget Generators	26	BN Pictures	Daisuke Nakajima		
February 17	Final Fantasy XV: Episode Ardyn – Prologue	1	Satelight			
April 1	Ultraman	13	Production I.G; Sola Digital Arts	Kenji Kamiyama; Shinji Aramaki		
April 19	Rilakkuma and Kaoru	13	Dwarf	Masahito Kobayashi		
May 11 – July 27	Miru Tights	12	Yokohama Animation Laboratory	Yuki Ogawa		
June 14	Aggretsuko (season 2)	10	Fanworks	Rarecho		
June 28	7 Seeds	12	Gonzo	Yukio Takahashi		
July 19 – January 23, 2020	Knights of the Zodiac: Saint Seiya	12	Toei Animation	Yoshiharu Ashino		
July 31 – October 31	Kengan Ashura	24	Larx Entertainment	Seiji Kishi		
August 15	Cannon Busters	12	Satelight; Yumeta Company	LeSean Thomas (Chief); Takahiro Natori		
August 23	Hero Mask (season 2)	9	Pierrot	Hiroyasu Aoki		
October 4 – December 20	Null & Peta	12	Shin-Ei Animation	Hirofumi Ogura		
October 10 – March 26, 2020	Blade of the Immortal -Immortal-	24	Liden Films	Hiroshi Hamasaki	Mugen no Jūnin: Immortal	
October 10 – December 26	Gundam Build Divers Re:Rise	13	Sunrise Beyond	Shinya Watada		
November 22	Dino Girl Gauko	20	Ascension	Akira Shigino	Kyōryū Shōjo Gauko	
November 28	Levius	12	Polygon Pictures	Hiroyuki Seshita (Chief); Keisuke Ide		
December 3	Obsolete (part 1)	6	Buemon	Hiroki Yamada; Seiichi Shirato		
December 30	The Disastrous Life of Saiki K.: Reawakened	6	J.C.Staff	Hiroaki Sakurai	Saiki Kusuo no Psi Nan: Psi Shidō-Hen	

=== Original video animations ===
A list of original video animations that debuted between January 1 and December 31, 2019.

First run start and end dates	Title	Episodes	Studio	Director(s)	Original title	Ref
January 3 – February 27	Ikki Tousen: Western Wolves	3	Arms	Takashi Watanabe (Chief); Mitsutoshi Satō		
January 16	Eromanga Sensei	2	A-1 Pictures	Ryohei Takeshita		
January 30	It's My Life	1	Creators in Pack	Hisayoshi Hirasawa		
February 27	Skull-face Bookseller Honda-san	1	DLE	Ouru Todoroki	Gaikotsu Shotenin Honda-san	
March 6	The Thousand Musketeers	1	TMS/Double Eagle	Kenichi Kasai	Senjūshi	
March 19 – September 22	Golden Kamuy (2nd/3rd OVAs)	2	Geno Studio	Hitoshi Nanba		
March 20	Hi Score Girl: Extra Stage	3	J.C.Staff	Yoshiki Yamakawa		
March 29	Wotakoi: Love is Hard for Otaku – Youth	1	A-1 Pictures	Yoshimasa Hiraike	Wotaku ni Koi wa Muzukashii	
June 14	Fate/kaleid liner Prisma Illya: Prisma Phantasm	1	Silver Link	Shin Ōnuma		
June 20	The Island of Giant Insects	1	Passione	Takeo Takahashi	Kyochū Rettō	
July 8	Hyperdimension Neptunia The Animation: Nepu no Natsuyasumi	1	Okuruto Noboru	Masahiro Mukai	Chō Jigen Game Neptune The Animation	
July 9	Magimoji Rurumo	2	J.C.Staff	Chikara Sakurai		
July 9 – November 27, 2020	That Time I Got Reincarnated as a Slime	5	Eight Bit	Yasuhito Kikuchi	Tensei shitara Slime Datta Ken	
September 10	The Girl From the Other Side: Siúil, a Rún	1	Wit Studio	Yūtarō Kubo; Satomi Maiya	Totsukuni no Shōjo	
September 25 – November 22	Midnight Occult Civil Servants	3	Liden Films	Tetsuya Watanabe	Mayonaka no Occult Kōmuin	
September 25	Mob Psycho 100	1	Bones	Yuzuru Tachikawa		
September 26	Is the Order a Rabbit?? ~Sing For You~	1	production doA	Hiroyuki Hashimoto	Gochūmon wa Usagi Desu ka?	
November 1	We Never Learn: BOKUBEN	1	Studio Silver; Arvo Animation	Yoshiaki Iwasaki	Bokutachi wa Benkyō ga Dekinai	
November 8	Re:Zero − Starting Life in Another World: Hyōketsu no Kizuna	1	White Fox	Kenichi Kawamura (Chief); Masaharu Watanabe	Re:Zero kara Hajimeru Isekai Seikatsu	
November 13	YuruYuri,	1	Lay-duce	Daigo Yamagishi		
November 20	Bean Bandit	1	Passione	Ken'ichi Sonoda (Chief); Yū Aoki		
November 22	Fragtime	1	Tear Studio	Takuya Satō		
December 8	Thus Spoke Kishibe Rohan	2	David Production	Toshiyuki Kato; Yasufumi Soejima	Kishibe Rohan wa Ugokanai	

== Deaths ==
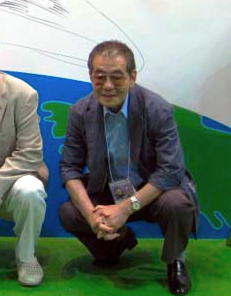
Monkey Punch

- January 6: Fusako Amachi, 78, Japanese voice actor
- January 25: Maeghan Albach, 44, American voice actress
- February 1: Kinryū Arimoto, 78, Japanese voice actor
- February 26: Yasuta Sato, 94, founder of Takara Tomy, collaborating to BeyBlade, Pretty Rhythm, Ryukendo and others,
- March 26: Fuyumi Shiraishi, 82, Japanese voice actor, radio announcer
- April 5: Wowaka, 31, Japanese musician; performed "Polaris", one of ending themes from anime series Boruto: Naruto Next Generations.
- April 11: Monkey Punch, 81, creator of Lupin III
- April 16: Kiyoshi Kawakubo, 89, Japanese voice actor
- June 10: Yuzuru Fujimoto, 83, Japanese voice actor
- July 18: Notable people killed in the Kyoto Animation arson attack
  - Naomi Ishida, 49, Japanese colorist
  - Yoshiji Kigami, 61, Japanese animator, director, and storyboarder
  - Futoshi Nishiya, 37, Japanese animator, director, and character designer
  - Yasuhiro Takemoto, 47, Japanese director
- July 28: Yuu Shimaka, 70, Japanese voice actor
- August 3: Kazuko Nakamura, 86, Japanese animator
- August 31: Michael Lindsay, 56, American voice actor

== See also ==
- 2019 in Japanese television
- 2019 Japanese imperial transition
- 2019 in British television
- 2019 in television
- 2019 in animation
