= 2019 in animation =

2019 in animation is an overview of notable events, including notable awards, list of films released, television show debuts and endings, and notable deaths.

== Events ==
=== January ===
- January 5: The second & final season of Milo Murphy's Law began simultaneously on Disney Channel & Disney XD with the premiere of the hour-long Phineas and Ferb crossover special "The Phineas and Ferb Effect". This special marks the debut of Ferb Fletcher's new voice actor David Errigo Jr. (replacing Thomas Brodie-Sangster).
- January 6: The Simpsons' 650th episode "Mad About the Toy" premieres on Fox, guest starring Bryan Batt as the character Philip Hefflin, and Bill de Blasio & Lawrence O'Donnell as themselves.
- January 13: The Family Guy episode "Trump Guy" first airs, in which the Griffin family meet U.S. President Donald Trump. The episode became controversial for satirizing Trump and his administration.
- January 21:
  - The final episode of Steven Universe, "Change Your Mind", airs on Cartoon Network.
  - The remastered version of The Bruce McMouse Show was released.
- January 25: Paw Patrol concludes its fifth season on Nickelodeon in the US with the half-hour special "Pups Save Ace's Birthday Surprise/Pups Save a Tower of Pizza".

=== February ===
- February 2: 46th Annie Awards.
- February 5: The Scooby-Doo direct-to-video film Scooby-Doo! and the Curse of the 13th Ghost releases on DVD and Digital services. The movie is a follow-up to the franchise's 1985 short series The 13 Ghosts of Scooby-Doo.
- February 8:
  - The Lego Movie 2: The Second Part is released.
  - Season 3 of Big Mouth premiered on Netflix with the Valentine's Day special "My Furry Valentine".
- February 22:
  - How to Train Your Dragon: The Hidden World, the third and final film of the How to Train Your Dragon franchise, releases to theatres to critical acclaim.
  - Season 6 of Paw Patrol begins on Nickelodeon in the US with the premiere of the episodes "Save the Jungle Penguins/Pups Save a Freighter".
- February 24:
  - 91st Academy Awards:
    - Spider-Man: Into the Spider-Verse by Bob Persichetti, Peter Ramsey, Rodney Rothman, Phil Lord and Christopher Miller wins the Academy Award for Best Animated Feature, becoming the first non-Disney film since 2012 to do so.
    - Bao by Domee Shi and Becky Neiman-Cobb wins the Academy Award for Best Animated Short.
  - Urbanus, De Vuilnisheld, an animated film based on the Flemish comic strip Urbanus, premieres.

=== March ===
- March 7: The Loud House concludes its third season on Nickelodeon with the episode "Antiqued Off". The season's finale was seen by over 1.2 million viewers that night.
- March 8: Following the release of the controversial 2019 documentary film Leaving Neverland, which details allegations against the late pop singer Michael Jackson of child sexual assault, The Simpsons producer James L. Brooks announces that the Simpsons episode "Stark Raving Dad", which guest starred Jackson, will be pulled from circulation. He explains to The Wall Street Journal: "This was a treasured episode. There are a lot of great memories we have wrapped up in that one, and this certainly doesn't allow them to remain. I'm against book-burning of any kind. But this is our book, and we're allowed to take out a chapter." Simpsons showrunner Al Jean says he believed Jackson had used the episode to groom boys for sexual abuse.
- March 9:
  - Big City Greens concludes its first season on Disney Channel with the episodes "Cricket's Place/Volunteer Tilly".
  - Paw Patrol concludes its fifth season on TVO in Canada with the half-hour special "Pups Save Ace's Birthday Surprise/Pups Save a Tower of Pizza".
- March 10: The fourth & final season of Star vs. the Forces of Evil begins on Disney Channel with the episodes "Butterfly Follies/Escape from the Pie Folk".
- March 11: Craig of the Creek concludes its first season on Cartoon Network with the episode "Alone Quest", the season's finale was seen by a total of 414 thousand viewers that night.
- March 15: The first volume of Love, Death & Robots concludes on Netflix.
- March 18:
  - The first episode of 101 Dalmatian Street is broadcast. It is the second television show based on the 101 Dalmatians franchise, following 101 Dalmatians: The Series from 1997.
  - Season 2 of Craig of the Creek begins on Cartoon Network with the premiere of the episodes "Memories of Bobby" and "Jacob of the Creek", the season's premiere was seen by a total of 477 thousand viewers that night.
- March 20: The soundtrack of Schoolhouse Rock! is added to the National Recording Registry.

=== April ===
- April 1: Anime series adaptation of Ultraman premiered on Netflix.
- April 8: American Dad! concludes its 15th season on TBS with the episode "The Future Is Borax". The season's finale was watched by only 749 thousand viewers that, marking another low in the show's viewership.
- April 15: Season 16 of American Dad! begins on TBS with the premiere of the episode "Fantasy Baseball". The season's premiere was watched by only 768 thousand viewers that, marking another low in the show's viewership.
- April 17: Anime-inspired music video for "You Should See Me in a Crown", by Billie Eilish, was released on YouTube. It was directed and animated by Takashi Murakami.
- April 26: The second season of She-Ra and the Princesses of Power premieres on Netflix.
- April 28: The Simpsons episode "D'oh Canada" premieres, where the family travels to Canada. The episode caused controversy among New Yorkers because of a satirical parody song mocking the city.

=== May ===
- May 12:
  - The Simpsons concludes its 30th season on Fox with the episode "Crystal Blue-Haired Persuasion", featuring guest stars Illeana Douglas, Werner Herzog, and Jenny Slate. The season's finale was seen by exactly 1.5 million viewers that night.
  - Bob's Burgers concludes its ninth season on Fox with the episode "Yes Without My Zeke". The season's finale was seen by over 1.4 million viewers that night.
  - Family Guy concludes its 17th season on Fox with the episode "Adam West High", the episode marks the death of the beloved character Mayor West due to his voice actor & real-life inspiration having actually passed away 2 years prior. The season's finale was seen by 1.7 million viewers that night.
- May 13: The Arthur 22nd-season episode "Mr. Ratburn and the Special Someone" premieres. The episode was banned in Alabama and Arkansas for its showcase of same-sex marriage in a children's program. Yet, it was praised by GLAAD Media Award for Outstanding Kids and Family Programming.
- May 18:
  - The final episode of Milo Murphy's Law premieres on Disney Channel.
  - Season 6 of Paw Patrol begins on TVO in the Canada with the premiere of the episodes "Save the Jungle Penguins/Pups Save a Freighter".
- May 19: The final episode of Star vs. the Forces of Evil premieres on Disney Channel.
- May 23: Music video for "Starlight Brigade", by TWRP featuring Dan Avidan, was released on YouTube.
- May 27: Season 4 of The Loud House begins on Nickelodeon with the premiere of the half-hour special "Friended! with the Casagrandes". This episode marks the debut of Ronnie Anne's best friend Sid Chang, who would go on to become a major character in the upcoming spin-off series The Casagrandes.

=== June ===
- June 7: Illumination's The Secret Life of Pets 2 was released.
- June 10: Love, Death & Robots is renewed for a second volume.
- June 10-20: New episodes of The Loud House focusing on Ronnie Anne, Bobby, & their extended family all premiere on Nickelodeon. These episodes serve as the backdoor pilots to the upcoming spin-off series The Casagrandes.
- June 14: Particular Crowd's Spycies premieres at the Shanghai International Film Festival.
- June 16: The final episode of The Powerpuff Girls reboot aired as the series ended quickly after 3 seasons since it was poorly received by fans of the original 1998 series.
- June 17: The first episode of Amphibia is broadcast on Disney Channel to positive reviews.
- June 21: Toy Story 4 premiered in theaters to critical acclaim & was a box-office success.
- June 24: The final episode of the original The Amazing World of Gumball series, "The Inquisition", premieres on Cartoon Network to mixed reviews due to the series ending on an unresolved cliffhanger. However, a feature film based on the series was announced in 2021, but is still shelved as of 2025, but a revival of the show premiered that same year.
- June 30: OK K.O.! Let's Be Heroes concludes its second season on Cartoon Network with the half-hour special "Dark Plaza". The season's finale was seen by a total of 29 thousand viewers that night.

=== July ===
- July 1: The first episode of Mao Mao: Heroes of Pure Heart airs on Cartoon Network.
- July 7: The third & final season of OK K.O.! Let's Be Heroes begins on Cartoon Network with the premiere of the episodes "We Are Heroes" & "K.O., Rad, and Enid!". The season's premiere was seen by a combined total of 705 thousand viewers that night.
- July 12: SpongeBob SquarePants celebrates its 20th anniversary with a television special titled "SpongeBob's Big Birthday Blowout" that premiered on Nickelodeon to positive reviews.
- July 18:
  - An arson attack at the Japanese studio Kyoto Animation results in 36 deaths and 33 injuries. The arson is one of the deadliest in Japanese history since the end of World War II; a majority of the victims are women. Among the victims are director Yasuhiro Takemoto, character designer Futoshi Nishiya, animator Yoshiji Kigami, and color designer Naomi Ishida. The late Japanese Prime Minister Shinzo Abe expresses his condolences, as do other world leaders including Canadian Prime Minister Justin Trudeau, Taiwanese President Tsai Ing-wen, and Secretary-General of the United Nations António Guterres. An outpouring of support for the victims and their families results in more than $30 million in donations from domestic Japanese sources, with an estimated additional $2.3 million in donations from international donors.
  - The season 1 finale of Amphibia, titled "Reunion", premieres on Disney Channel to critical acclaim.
- July 19:
  - Molly of Denali premieres on PBS Kids to high acclaim. It is the first children's animated series with an Alaska Native as the lead character.
  - The Lion King remake, produced by Fairview Entertainment, is released to theaters with mixed reviews from critics. It is the highest-grossing animated film of all time from August 2019 to September 2024.
- July 23: Disney Channel greenlights a new animated series for its network titled The Curse of Molly McGee.
- July 25: Glitch Productions' first indie-animated series Meta Runner premieres on YouTube on the SMG4 channel.

=== August ===
- August 2: The third season of She-Ra and the Princesses of Power is released on Netflix.
- August 4: The OK K.O.! Let's Be Heroes episode "Let's Meet Sonic" premieres on Cartoon Network. Hence the episode's name, it is a crossover with the Sonic the Hedgehog franchise, with Roger Craig Smith and Colleen O'Shaughnessey reprising their roles as the titular hedgehog and Miles "Tails" Prower.
- August 9: Rocko's Modern Life: Static Cling, a revival movie based on Rocko's Modern Life, premieres on Netflix to critical acclaim.
- August 14: The Angry Birds Movie 2 is released. It is the highest-rated animated film based on a video game, with a 74% score on Rotten Tomatoes.
- August 16: Invader Zim: Enter the Florpus, a revival movie based on Invader Zim, premieres on Netflix to high critical acclaim, with a 100% score on Rotten Tomatoes.

=== September ===
- September 2: Steven Universe: The Movie, a sequel television musical film based on Steven Universe, premieres on Cartoon Network.
- September 3: The Scooby-Doo direct-to-video film Scooby-Doo! Return to Zombie Island releases on Digital services, later released on DVD on October 1st. The film is a direct sequel to 1998 movie Scooby-Doo on Zombie Island, the franchises first ever direct-to-video film.
- September 6: OK K.O.! Let's Be Heroes airs its series finale on Cartoon Network.
- September 21: The SpongeBob SquarePants episode "SpongeBob in RandomLand" airs. This episode originally included the famous image based on creepypasta's Squidward's Suicide, which was attended to make fun of "try-hard edgy fanfiction" before quickly replacing it with Squidward as an infant for subsequent runs.
- September 25: Season 23 of South Park begins on Comedy Central with the premiere of the episode "Mexican Joker".
- September 27:
  - Dragons: Rescue Riders premieres on Netflix.
  - The 5th season of Bubble Guppies premieres on Nickelodeon almost 3 years after the finale of the show's original run.
- September 29:
  - Season 31 of The Simpsons begins on Fox with the premiere of the episode "The Winter of Our Monetized Content", guest starring famed comedian John Mulaney. The season's premiere was seen by over 2.3 million viewers that night.
  - The first episode of Bless the Harts, titled "Hug N' Bugs", premieres on Fox. The series premiere was seen by over 1.8 million viewers that night.
  - Season 10 of Bob's Burgers begins on Fox with the premiere of the episode "The Ring (But Not Scary)". The season's premiere was seen by over 1.8 million viewers that night.
  - Season 18 of Family Guy begins on Fox with the premiere of the episode "Yacht Rocky". The season's premiere was seen by over 1.8 million viewers that night.

=== October ===
- October 4:
  - The remaining 10 episodes from Season 3 of Big Mouth premieres on Netflix.
  - South Park is banned in China after the premiere of the episode "Band in China", which mocked the country and its government. Parker and Stone issued a sarcastic apology in response.
  - Season 6 of Teen Titans Go! begins on Cartoon Network (despite still being in its fifth season) with the premiere of the episode "Butt Atoms".
- October 9: South Park's 300th episode "Shots!!!" premieres on Comedy Central.
- October 10:
  - Anime series adaptation of Paru Itagaki's Beastars airs its first episode on Japanese television.
  - The Meta Runner season one finale "Shutdown" premiered on YouTube on the SMG4 channel.
- October 12: After nine years on the air, My Little Pony: Friendship Is Magic airs its series finale on Discovery Family.
- October 13: The season 1 finale of Bluey titled, "Daddy Putdown", premieres to universal acclaim.
- October 14: The Casagrandes, a spinoff of The Loud House premieres on Nickelodeon.
- October 25: The first 8 episodes from the sixth & final season of BoJack Horseman premiered on Netflix.
- October 28: The Hazbin Hotel pilot "That's Entertainment" was released on YouTube to critical acclaim. The pilot ended up getting its own series on Prime Video 4 years later.

=== November ===
- November 5: The fourth season of She-Ra and the Princesses of Power is released on Netflix.
- November 8:
  - Green Eggs and Ham premieres its first season on Netflix to positive reviews. A second season, which is the final season, was released in 2022.
  - Klaus premieres on Netflix.
- November 10: Grey DeLisle replaces Russi Taylor as the voice of Martin Prince, Sherri and Terri on The Simpsons starting with the episode "Marge the Lumberjill" due to the latter's death on July 26, 2019.
- November 11:
  - Blue's Clues & You!, a reboot of the original Blue's Clues premieres on Nickelodeon.
  - Xavier Riddle and the Secret Museum premieres on PBS Kids.
- November 16: Season 2 of Big City Greens begins on Disney Channel, with the premiere of the episodes "Cricket's Kapowie/Car Trouble".
- November 22: Disney releases Frozen 2.
- November 24: The Simpsons episode "Thanksgiving of Horror" premieres, guest starring Black Mirror creator Charlie Brooker. This was also the last episode featuring Russi Taylor as Martin Prince recorded before her death on July 26, 2019, although Grey DeLisle already took over that character a few episodes prior due to "Thanksgiving of Horror" being a leftover episode from the previous season.
- November 25: The pilot episode of Vivienne Medrano's independent web series Helluva Boss (the sister show to Hazbin Hotel) was released on YouTube. Medrano later confirmed that the pilot was non-canon to the series, a canon remake of the show's pilot titled "Mission: Zero" was released 6 years later.

=== December ===
- December 4: Steven Universe creator Rebecca Sugar and OK K.O.! Let's Be Heroes creator/Steven Universe crew member Ian Jones-Quartey get married.
- December 7:
  - Television series Kingdom Force premiered in Canada.
  - Steven Universe Future, a limited epilogue series set after the events of both Steven Universe and Steven Universe: The Movie, premieres on Cartoon Network.
- December 11:
  - Walt Disney's Sleeping Beauty is added to the National Film Registry.
  - South Park concludes its 23rd season on Comedy Central with the Christmas special "Christmas Snow". The episode was seen only by only 810 thousand viewers that night, marking another low for the show's episode viewership. This was also the last episode to premiere in the 2010s.
- December 21: The second episode of Michael Pitts' independent webseries Sheriff Hayseed, titled "Boomerang in a Gun Fight", is released on YouTube.
- December 25: Spies in Disguise is released as the final Blue Sky Studios film before their shutdown in April 2021.
- December 26: Beastars airs its first-season finale episode in Japan.

=== Specific date unknown ===
- Beginning this year, Disney begin editing several older films, including A Goofy Movie, Toy Story 2 and Lilo & Stitch, to remove scenes that are considered harmful or suggestive to young children in today's standards.

== Awards ==
- Academy Award for Best Animated Feature: Spider-Man: Into the Spider-Verse
- Academy Award for Best Animated Short Film: Bao
- American Cinema Editors Award for Best Edited Animated Feature Film: Spider-Man: Into the Spider-Verse
- Annecy International Animated Film Festival Cristal du long métrage: I Lost My Body
- Annie Award for Best Animated Feature: Spider-Man: Into the Spider-Verse
- Annie Award for Best Animated Feature — Independent: I Lost My Body
- Asia Pacific Screen Award for Best Animated Feature Film: Rezo
- BAFTA Award for Best Animated Film: Spider-Man: Into the Spider-Verse
- César Award for Best Animated Film: Dilili in Paris
- Chicago Film Critics Association Award for Best Animated Film: Spider-Man: Into the Spider-Verse
- Critics' Choice Movie Award for Best Animated Feature: Spider-Man: Into the Spider-Verse
- Dallas–Fort Worth Film Critics Association Award for Best Animated Film: Isle of Dogs
- European Film Award for Best Animated Feature Film: I Lost My Body
- Florida Film Critics Circle Award for Best Animated Film: I Lost My Body
- Golden Globe Award for Best Animated Feature Film: Missing Link
- Golden Reel Awards: Spider-Man: Into the Spider-Verse
- Goya Award for Best Animated Film: Buñuel in the Labyrinth of the Turtles
- Hollywood Animation Award: Toy Story 4
- Japan Academy Film Prize for Animation of the Year: Mirai
- Kids' Choice Award for Favorite Animated Movie: Incredibles 2
- Los Angeles Film Critics Association Award for Best Animated Film: I Lost My Body
- Mainichi Film Award for Best Animation Film: Children of the Sea
- National Board of Review Award for Best Animated Film: How to Train Your Dragon: The Hidden World
- New York Film Critics Circle Award for Best Animated Film: I Lost My Body
- Online Film Critics Society Award for Best Animated Film: Spider-Man: Into the Spider-Verse
- Producers Guild of America Award for Best Animated Motion Picture: Spider-Man: Into the Spider-Verse
- San Diego Film Critics Society Award for Best Animated Film: I Lost My Body
- San Francisco Film Critics Circle Award for Best Animated Feature: I Lost My Body
- Saturn Award for Best Animated Film: Spider-Man: Into the Spider-Verse
- St. Louis Gateway Film Critics Association Award for Best Animated Film: Toy Story 4
- Tokyo Anime Award: Detective Conan: Zero the Enforcer and Zombieland Saga
- Toronto Film Critics Association Award for Best Animated Film: Missing Link
- Visual Effects Society Award for Outstanding Visual Effects in an Animated Feature: Missing Link
- Washington D.C. Area Film Critics Association Award for Best Animated Feature: Toy Story 4

== Television series debuts ==
Date	Title	Channel	Year
January 1	Pinky Malinky	Netflix	2019
January 5	Transformers: Rescue Bots Academy	Discovery Family	2019–2021
January 13	Tigtone	Adult Swim	2019–2020
January 18	Carmen Sandiego	Netflix	2019–2021
January 18	Gigantosaurus	Disney Junior	2019–2022
January 26	Gen:Lock	Rooster Teeth	2019–2021
January 27	Rainbow Butterfly Unicorn Kitty	Nickelodeon	2019
February 1	Care Bears: Unlock the Magic	Boomerang	2019–2024
February 11	Woohoo Storytime: Roys Bedoys	YouTube	2019–present
February 22	Corn & Peg	Nickelodeon	2019–2020
February 27	Alien News Desk	Syfy	2019
March 8	DC Super Hero Girls	Cartoon Network	2019–2021
March 8	Costume Quest	Amazon Video	2019–present
March 11	Filly Funtasia	Frisbee	2019–present
March 15	Love, Death & Robots	Netflix	2019–present
March 15	YooHoo to the Rescue	Netflix	2019–2020
March 22	Charlie's Colorforms City	Netflix	2019–2022
March 23	Pokémon the Series: Sun & Moon – Ultra Legends	Disney XD	2019–2020
March 30	Victor and Valentino	Cartoon Network	2019–2022
March 31	Trailer Park Boys: The Animated Series	Netflix	2019–2020
April 1	Gēmusetto Machu Picchu	Adult Swim	2019
April 7	Lazor Wulf	Adult Swim	2019–2021
April 12	Mighty Little Bheem	Netflix	2019–present
April 12	The Bug Diaries	Amazon Video	2019–present
April 19	Rilakkuma and Kaoru	Netflix	2019–2022
May 3	Tuca & Bertie	Netflix	2019
June 9	Sugar and Toys	Fuse	2019–present
June 10	Ollie & Scoops	YouTube	2019–present
June 14	T.O.T.S.	Disney Junior	2019–2022
June 17	Amphibia	Disney Channel	2019–2022
June 21	The Bravest Knight	Hulu	2019
June 22	Lego City Adventures	Nickelodeon	2019–present
June 27	Scooby-Doo and Guess Who?	Boomerang	2019–2021
June 27	Pinkfong Wonderstar	YouTube	2019–present
July 1	Mao Mao: Heroes of Pure Heart	Cartoon Network	2019–2020
July 6	The Polos	Discovery Family	2019–present
July 15	Molly of Denali	PBS Kids	2019–present
July 16	Human Discoveries	Facebook Watch	2019
July 20	Where's Waldo?	Universal Kids	2019–2021
July 27	Norman Picklestripes	Universal Kids	2019–present
July 29	Twelve Forever	Netflix	2019
August 5	Infinity Train	Cartoon Network, HBO Max	2019–2021
September 2	Middle School Moguls	Nickelodeon	2019
September 6	Archibald's Next Big Thing	Netflix	2019–2021
September 13	Undone	Amazon Video	2019–present
September 14	Lego Jurassic World: Legend of Isla Nublar	Nickelodeon	2019–2020
September 17	The Last Kids on Earth	Netflix	2019–2021
September 21	Power Players	Cartoon Network	2019–2020
September 25	Cake	FXX	2019–present
September 27	DreamWorks Dragons: Rescue Riders	Netflix	2019–2022
September 29	Bless the Harts	Fox	2019–2021
October 3	Seis Manos	Netflix	2019–present
October 7	Primal	Adult Swim	2019–present
October 10	You're Not a Monster	IMDb	2019–present
October 14	The Casagrandes	Nickelodeon	2019–2022
October 22	The VeggieTales Show	TBN	2019–present
October 28	Hazbin Hotel (Note: Pilot episode only, the actual series premiered on January 19, 2024 on Prime Video.)	YouTube	2019–present
November 1	Snoopy in Space	Apple TV+	2019–present
November 1	Hello Ninja	Netflix	2019–2021
November 8	Green Eggs and Ham	Netflix	2019–2022
November 8	The Rocketeer	Disney Channel	2019–2020
November 11	Xavier Riddle and the Secret Museum	PBS Kids	2019–present
November 11	Blue's Clues & You!	Nickelodeon	2019–2024
November 12	Legend of the Three Caballeros	Disney+	2019
November 12	Forky Asks a Question	Disney+	2019
November 17	Momma Named Me Sheriff	Adult Swim	2019–2021
November 25	Helluva Boss (Note: Pilot episode only, the actual series premiered on October 31, 2020.)	YouTube	2019–present
November 29	Harley Quinn	DC Universe, HBO Max	2019–present
December 6	Garfield Originals	France 3	2019-2020
December 6	Tales of Tappi the Viking	TVP VOD	2019
December 7	Kingdom Force	CBC Kids	2019–2020
December 7	Steven Universe Future	Cartoon Network	2019–2020
December 7	Clifford the Big Red Dog	PBS Kids, Amazon Prime Video	2019–2021
December 20	The Adventures of Paddington	Nickelodeon	2019–2025
December 26	Fast & Furious: Spy Racers	Netflix	2019–2021

== Television series endings ==
Date	Title	Channel	Year	Notes
January 11	The Adventures of Rocky and Bullwinkle	Amazon Prime Video	2018–2019	Ended
January 17	Constantine: City of Demons	CW Seed	2018-2019	Ended
January 18	Clash-A-Rama: The Series	YouTube	2016-2019	Ended
January 21	Steven Universe	Cartoon Network	2013–2019	Ended
January 26	Littlest Pet Shop: A World of Our Own	Discovery Family	2018–2019	Ended
January 30	Salad Fingers	Newgrounds	2004–2019 & 2022	Ended, Until revived in 2022.
January 30	Oggy and the Cockroaches	Gulli	1998–2019	Ended
February 7	Supernoobs	Cartoon Network, Hulu	2015–2019	Cancelled
February 9	Monster High: The Adventures of the Ghoul Squad	YouTube	2018–2019	Cancelled
February 24	Avengers Assemble	Disney XD	2013–2019	Ended
February 24	Pokémon the Series: Sun & Moon – Ultra Adventures	Disney XD	2018–2019	Ended
February 25	Tumble Leaf	Amazon Prime Video	2014–2019	Ended
March 22	Charlie's Colorforms City	Netflix	2019	Ended
March 24	Hot Streets	Adult Swim	2018–2019	Ended
April 1	Gēmusetto Machu Picchu	Adult Swim	2019	Ended
May 3	Tuca & Bertie	Netflix	2019	Cancelled, until revived by Adult Swim in 2021.
May 4	Hanazuki: Full of Treasures	YouTube	2017–2019	Ended
May 8	Ready Jet Go!	PBS Kids	2016–2019	Ended
May 17	Mighty Magiswords	Cartoon Network	2016–2019	Ended
May 18	Milo Murphy's Law	Disney XD, Disney Channel	2016–2019	Ended
May 19	Star vs. the Forces of Evil	Disney XD, Disney Channel	2015–2019	Ended
May 23	Mega Man: Fully Charged	Cartoon Network	2018–2019	Ended
May 27	We Bare Bears	Cartoon Network	2015–2019	Ended
May 29	Happy!	Syfy	2017–2019	Ended
May 30	Piggy Tales	Toons.TV	2014–2019	Ended
May 31	Welcome to the Wayne	Nicktoons	2017–2019	Ended
June 9	Guardians of the Galaxy	Disney XD	2015–2019	Ended
June 16	The Powerpuff Girls (2016)	Cartoon Network	2016–2019	Ended
June 24 (Note: The final episodes of the series were initially released online on May 31st.)	The Amazing World of Gumball	Cartoon Network	2011–2019	Ended, until revived by Hulu in 2025.
July 12	3Below: Tales of Arcadia	Netflix	2018–2019	Ended
July 17	Pinky Malinky	Netflix	2019	Cancelled
July 29	Twelve Forever	Netflix	2019	Cancelled
August 2	Ask the StoryBots	Netflix	2016–2019	Ended
August 9	Dora the Explorer	Nickelodeon	2000–2019	Ended
August 23	The Stinky & Dirty Show	Amazon Prime Video	2016–2019	Ended
August 24	Max & Ruby	Nickelodeon	2002–2019	Ended
August 30	True and the Rainbow Kingdom	Netflix	2017–2019	Ended
September 6	OK K.O.! Let's Be Heroes	Cartoon Network	2017–2019	Ended
September 6	Niko and the Sword of Light	Amazon Prime Video	2017–2019	Ended
September 29	Middle School Moguls	Nickelodeon	2019	Ended
October 4	Super Monsters	Netflix	2017–2019	Ended
October 5	Legend Quest	Netflix	2017–2019	Ended
October 11	The Bravest Knight	Hulu	2019	Ended
October 12	My Little Pony: Friendship Is Magic	Discovery Family	2010–2019	Ended
November 3	The Lion Guard	Disney Channel, Disney Junior	2016–2019	Ended
November 12	Legend of the Three Caballeros	Disney+	2019	Cancelled
November 12	Forky Asks a Question	Disney+	2019	Ended
November 15	Llama Llama	Netflix	2018–2019	Cancelled
November 18	Mr. Pickles	Adult Swim	2014–2019	Cancelled
November 22	Trolls: The Beat Goes On!	Netflix	2018–2019	Ended
November 24	Wacky Races	Boomerang	2017–2019	Ended
December 1	Rainbow Butterfly Unicorn Kitty	Nickelodeon	2019	Ended
December 7	Bing	CBeebies, Cartoonito	2014–2019	Ended
December 21	Sheriff Hayseed	YouTube	2017–2019	Ended

== Television season premieres ==
Date	Title	Season	Channel, Streaming
January 5	Milo Murphy's Law	2	Disney Channel/Disney XD
February 4	Unikitty!	2	Cartoon Network
February 8	Big Mouth	3	Netflix
February 22	Paw Patrol	6	Nickelodeon (Note: Season later premiered in Canada on TVO on May 18th.)
February 23	Ben 10 (2016)	3	Cartoon Network
March 10	Star vs. the Forces of Evil	4	Disney Channel/Disney XD
March 18	Craig of the Creek	2	Cartoon Network
May 27	The Loud House	4	Nickelodeon
July 7	OK K.O.! Let's Be Heroes	3	Cartoon Network
September 25	South Park	23	Comedy Central
September 29	Bob's Burgers	10	Fox
September 29	Family Guy	18	Fox
September 29	The Simpsons	31	Fox
October 4	Teen Titans Go!	6	Cartoon Network
October 25	BoJack Horseman	6	Netflix
November 10	Rick and Morty	4	Adult Swim (Cartoon Network)
November 16	Big City Greens	2	Disney Channel
December 24	Unikitty!	3	Cartoon Network

== Television season finales ==
Date	Title	Season	Channel, Streaming
January 25	Paw Patrol	5	Nickelodeon (Note: Season later concluded in Canada on TVO on March 9th.)
February 4	Unikitty!	1	Cartoon Network
March 7	The Loud House	3	Nickelodeon
March 9	Big City Greens	1	Disney Channel
March 11	Craig of the Creek	1	Cartoon Network
May 12	Bob's Burgers	9	Fox
May 12	Family Guy	17	Fox
May 12	The Simpsons	30	Fox
June 30	OK K.O.! Let's Be Heroes	2	Cartoon Network
July 18	Amphibia	1	Disney Channel
July 21	Summer Camp Island	1	Cartoon Network
August 9	Infinity Train	1	Cartoon Network
September 12	DuckTales (2017)	2	Disney Channel
October 4	Big Mouth	3	Netflix
October 26	Victor and Valentino	1	Cartoon Network
December 11	South Park	23	Comedy Central
December 24	Unikitty!	2	Cartoon Network

== Deaths ==
=== January ===
- January 2: Bob Einstein, American actor, comedy writer and producer (voice of Super Dave Osborne in Super Dave: Daredevil for Hire, Elephant Trainer and The Bookie in The Life & Times of Tim, Stuff in Strange Magic), dies from cancer at age 76.
- January 6: W. Morgan Sheppard, English actor (voice of Dum Dum Dugan in Iron Man, Erik Hellstrom in Atlantis: Milo's Return, Lawrence Limburger in Biker Mice from Mars, Santa Claus in the Prep & Landing franchise, Merlin in the Justice League episode "A Knight of Shadows"), dies at age 86.
- January 15:
  - Carol Channing, American actress and singer (voice of Grandmama in The Addams Family, Mehitabel in Shinbone Alley, Canina Lafur in Chip 'n Dale: Rescue Rangers, Muddy in Happily Ever After, Ms. Fieldmouse in Thumbelina, Fanny in The Brave Little Toaster Goes to Mars, Witch in the 2 Stupid Dogs episode "Red Strikes Back", Cornelia C. Contralto II in The Magic School Bus episode "In the Haunted House", herself in the Family Guy episode "Patriot Games"), dies at age 97.
  - Bradley Bolke, American voice actor (voice of Chumley the Walrus in Underdog), dies at age 93.
- January 26: Michel Legrand, French composer (The Smurfs and the Magic Flute), dies at age 86.
- January 27: Erica Yohn, American actress (voice of Mama Mousekewitz in An American Tail), dies at age 90.
- January 29: James Ingram, American singer and actor (voice of Buster in the English version of The Fearless Four, performed the songs "Somewhere Out There" from An American Tail and "Our Time Has Come" from Cats Don't Dance), dies at age 66.
- January 30: Dick Miller, American actor (voice of Boxy Bennett in Batman: The Animated Series, Chuckie Sol in Batman: Mask of the Phantasm, Oberon in the Justice League Unlimited episode "The Ties That Bind"), dies at age 90.

=== February ===
- February 6: Trista H. Navarro, American production manager (The Simpsons, The Simpsons Movie), dies at age 43.
- February 7: Ted Stearn, American comic book artist, animator, storyboard artist (Beavis and Butt-Head Do America, Daria, Downtown, Drawn Together, King of the Hill, Squirrel Boy, Sit Down, Shut Up, Futurama, Rick and Morty, Animals.) and director (Daria, Beavis and Butt-Head), dies from AIDS at age 58.
- February 9:
  - Ron W. Miller, American businessman, film producer, football player (president and CEO of The Walt Disney Company from 1978 to 1984), dies at age 85.
  - Tomi Ungerer, French novelist, illustrator, cartoonist and poster designer (narrator in The Three Robbers and The Moon Man), dies at age 87.
  - C. Raggio IV, American character designer (Cartoon Network Studios, The Mighty B!, Disney Television Animation) and storyboard artist (The Replacements, Illumination, The Angry Birds Movie 2), dies from blunt trauma at age 40.
- February 15:
  - Werner Hierl, German comics artist (Rolf Kauka), and animator (Bavaria Film), dies at age 88 or 89.
  - Dave Smith, American archivist (founder of the Walt Disney Archives) and author (Disney A to Z), dies at age 78.
- February 21: Antonia Rey, Cuban-born American actress (portrayed Assunta Bianchi in Happy!, voice of Abuela and Wizzles in Dora the Explorer, additional voices in Courage the Cowardly Dog), dies at age 92.
- February 23: Katherine Helmond, American actress (voice of Lizzie in the Cars franchise, Connie Stromwell in the Batman: The Animated Series episode "It's Never Too Late", Dugong in The Wild Thornberrys episode "Reef Grief"), dies at age 89.
- February 28: Aron Tager, American actor (voice of Cranky Kong in Donkey Kong Country, King Allfire in Blazing Dragons, additional voices in The Busy World of Richard Scarry and The Adventures of Sam & Max: Freelance Police), dies at age 84.

=== March ===
- March 4: Luke Perry, American actor (voice of Napoleon Brie in Biker Mice from Mars, Sub-Zero in Mortal Kombat: Defenders of the Realm, Rick Jones in The Incredible Hulk, Stewart Waldinger in Pepper Ann, Ponce de Leon in the Clone High episode "Litter Kills: Litterally", Jacob in the Generator Rex episode "The Architect", Fang in the Pound Puppies episode "Rebel Without a Collar", voiced himself in The Simpsons episode "Krusty Gets Kancelled", the Family Guy episode "The Story on Page One", and the Johnny Bravo episode "Luke Perry's Guide to Love"), dies from a stroke at age 52.
- March 7: Rosto, Dutch animator and film director (The Monster of Nix, No Place Like Home, Lonely Bones, Splintertime), dies at age 50.
- March 16:
  - Tom Hatten, American cartoonist, TV presenter (host of The Popeye Show) and actor (voice of Farmer Fitzgibbons in The Secret of NIMH), dies at age 92.
  - Larry DiTillio, American film and television screenwriter (Fat Albert and the Cosby Kids, He-Man and the Masters of the Universe, Beast Wars), dies at age 79.
- March 28: Maury Laws, American composer (Rankin/Bass), dies at age 95.
- March 29: Shane Rimmer, Canadian actor (voice of Louis Watterson in The Amazing World of Gumball), dies at age 89.
- March 31: Don Morgan, American animator (UPA, Chuck Jones, Walt Disney Animation, Bakshi Animation, Hanna-Barbera) and comics artist, dies at age 80.

=== April ===
- April 7: Seymour Cassel, American actor (voice of Chuck Sirianni in the Justice League Unlimited episode "I Am Legion", Man in Panda Suit in the Gary the Rat episode "Manratten"), dies at age 84.
- April 11: Monkey Punch, Japanese manga artist (creator of Lupin III), dies at age 81.
- April 12: Georgia Engel, American actress (voice of Love-a-Lot Bear in The Care Bears Movie, Bobbie in the Open Season franchise, Evelyn in Hercules, Willow Song in The Magic of Herself the Elf, Old Woman in the Hey Arnold! episode "Bag of Money", Rose in the Unsupervised episode "Youngbloods"), dies at age 70.
- April 23: Edward Kelsey, English voice actor (voice of Colonel K. and Baron Silas Greenback in Danger Mouse, Mr. Growbag in Wallace and Gromit: The Curse of the Were-Rabbit), dies at age 88.
- April 28: Bruce Bickford, American animator (made the surreal clay-animated sequences in Frank Zappa's concert films The Dub Room Special, Baby Snakes and The Amazing Mr. Bickford), dies at age 72.
- April 30: Peter Mayhew, English-American actor (voice of Chewbacca in Star Wars: The Clone Wars), dies at age 74.

=== May ===
- May 2: Chris Reccardi, American animator (The New Adventures of Beany and Cecil, The Butter Battle Book, Tiny Toon Adventures, The Simpsons, The Ren & Stimpy Show, Hercules and Xena - The Animated Movie: The Battle for Mount Olympus, Cloudy with a Chance of Meatballs, The Lego Movie, designed the end credits sequence of Hotel Transylvania 3: Summer Vacation), storyboard artist (Tiny Toon Adventures, Nickelodeon Animation Studio, Universal Cartoon Studios, Cow and Chicken, I Am Weasel, Dilbert, Cartoon Network Studios, DreamWorks Animation, The Haunted World of El Superbeasto, The Ricky Gervais Show, Kick Buttowski: Suburban Daredevil, Tron: Uprising, The Mighty Ones), character designer (Wander Over Yonder, Samurai Jack), background artist (Foster's Home for Imaginary Friends, Mickey Mouse), graphic designer, musician, writer (The Ren & Stimpy Show, Cartoon Network Studios, SpongeBob SquarePants, Billy Dilley's Super-Duper Subterranean Summer), director (The Ren & Stimpy Show, Super Robot Monkey Team Hyperforce Go!) and producer (Regular Show), dies from a heart attack at age 54.
- May 13: Hu Jinqing, Chinese animator and director (The Fight Between the Snipe and the Clam, Calabash Brothers), dies at age 83.
- May 14: Tim Conway, American actor and comedian (voice of Barnacle Boy in SpongeBob SquarePants, himself in The Simpsons episode "The Simpsons Spin-Off Showcase" and The New Scooby-Doo Movies episode "The Spirit Spooked Sports Show"), dies at age 85.
- May 22: Flaminia Jandolo, Italian voice actress (dub voice of Lady in Lady and the Tramp, Merryweather in Sleeping Beauty and Perdita in One Hundred and One Dalmatians), dies at age 89.
- May 30: Milan Blažeković, Croatian animator (The Elm-Chanted Forest, The Magician's Hat, Lapitch the Little Shoemaker), dies at age 78.

=== June ===
- June 6: Dr. John, American singer and songwriter (voice of The Sun in Whoopi's Littleburg, performed the theme songs of Whoopi's Littleburg and Curious George, and "Down in New Orleans" in The Princess and the Frog), dies from a heart attack at age 77.
- June 7: Nonnie Griffin, Canadian actress (voice of Funshine Bear in Care Bears, Harmony Bear in Care Bears Movie II: A New Generation, Shadu in Ewoks, Pepper Potts, Black Widow, and Enchantress in The Marvel Super Heroes), dies at age 85.
- June 13: Sean McCann, Canadian actor (voice of Grandfather Bear in Little Bear, Mr. Kravitz in the Rescue Heroes episode "On Thin Ice", Russell Copeland in George Shrinks), dies at age 83.
- June 18: Milton Quon, American animator (Walt Disney Animation Studios), artist and actor, dies at age 105.
- June 28: Kaj Pindal, Danish-Canadian comics artist and animator (What on Earth!, Peep and the Big Wide World), dies at age 91.
- June 30: Guillermo Mordillo, Argentine cartoonist and animator (Estudios Galas, produced animated shorts based on his cartoons), dies at age 86.

=== July ===
- July 1: Dennis Snee, American screenwriter (wrote The Simpsons episode "Special Edna"), dies at age 68.
- July 3: Arte Johnson, American comic actor (voice of Tyrone in Baggy Pants and the Nitwits, Farquad and Skull Ghost in Scooby-Doo Meets the Boo Brothers, Devil Smurf in The Smurfs, Weerd in The 13 Ghosts of Scooby-Doo, Count Ray and Dr. Ludwig von Strangeduck in DuckTales, Newt in Animaniacs, Virman Vundabar in the Justice League Unlimited episode "The Ties That Bind"), dies at age 90.
- July 7: Cameron Boyce, American actor (voice of Jake in seasons 2-3 of Jake and the Never Land Pirates, Carlos in Descendants: Wicked World, Luke Ross in the Ultimate Spider-Man episode "Halloween Night at the Museum", Shocker in the Spider-Man episode "Osborn Academy"), dies at age 20.
- July 9:
  - Freddie Jones, English actor (voice of Dallben in The Black Cauldron), dies at age 91.
  - Rip Torn, American actor (voice of Zeus in the Hercules franchise, Lou De Luca in Bee Movie, M in the TripTank episode "#InsideRoy"), dies from complications from Alzheimer's disease at age 88.
- July 11: Pepita Pardell, Spanish animator, cartoonist, illustrator and painter (worked for Balet y Blay), dies at age 91.
- July 18:
  - Naomi Ishida, Japanese color designer (The Melancholy of Haruhi Suzumiya, A Silent Voice) and member of Kyoto Animation, dies at age 49 in the Kyoto Animation arson attack.
  - Yoshiji Kigami, Japanese director (MUNTO), animator (Akira, A Silent Voice), and member of Kyoto Animation, dies at age 61 in the Kyoto Animation arson attack.
  - Futoshi Nishiya, Japanese character designer (Free!, A Silent Voice), animator (Clannad, The Melancholy of Haruhi Suzumiya), and member of Kyoto Animation, dies at age 37 in the Kyoto Animation arson attack.
  - Yasuhiro Takemoto, Japanese director (The Disappearance of Haruhi Suzumiya, Hyouka) and member of Kyoto Animation, dies at age 47 in the Kyoto Animation arson attack.
- July 23: Gabe Khouth, Canadian voice actor (voice of Nicol Amalfi in Gundam SEED, Goten in the Ocean dub of Dragon Ball Z, Orko and Mekaneck in He-Man and the Masters of the Universe, Spinner Cortez in Hot Wheels Battle Force 5), dies at age 47.
- July 26: Russi Taylor, American voice actress (voice of Gonzo, Camilla and Robin in Muppet Babies, Huey, Dewey, and Louie and Webby Vanderquack in DuckTales, Phantasma in Scooby-Doo and the Ghoul School and the OK K.O.! Let's Be Heroes episode "Monster Party", Martin Prince, Üter, and Sherri and Terri in The Simpsons, Widget in Widget the World Watcher, Ferny Toro and Annie Winks in Jakers! The Adventures of Piggley Winks, young Donald Duck in the DuckTales episode "Last Christmas!", continued voice of Minnie Mouse and Pebbles Flintstone), dies at age 75.
- July 29: Daniele Fagarazzi, AKA Dani, Italian animator and comic artist (worked on Arrivano i Putti-Potti), dies at age 54.

=== August ===
- August 4: Stu Rosen, American voice director and actor (Hulk Hogan's Rock 'n' Wrestling, The Legend of Prince Valiant, Fraggle Rock: The Animated Series), dies at age 80.
- August 16: Richard Williams, Canadian-English animator and director (The Thief and the Cobbler, directed the animated scenes in What's New Pussycat?, A Funny Thing Happened on the Way to the Forum, Casino Royale, The Charge of the Light Brigade, Can Heironymus Merkin Ever Forget Mercy Humppe and Find True Happiness?, The Return of the Pink Panther, The Pink Panther Strikes Again and Who Framed Roger Rabbit), dies at age 86.
- August 18: Gillian Hanna, Irish actress (voice of Betty McArthur in The Amazing World of Gumball, Midwife and Aunty Flo in Ethel & Ernest), dies at age 75.
- August 21: Richard Trueblood, American animator (Hanna-Barbera, The Nine Lives of Fritz the Cat, The Mouse and His Child, A Family Circus Christmas, Filmation), storyboard artist (Maxie's World, Goof Troop, Sonic the Hedgehog, Bonkers), sheet timer (Little Nemo: Adventures in Slumberland, Disney Television Animation, DuckTales the Movie: Treasure of the Lost Lamp, Animaniacs, DIC Entertainment, The Incredible Hulk, Adelaide Productions, All Dogs Go to Heaven: The Series, Histeria!, The Secret of NIMH 2: Timmy to the Rescue, The Wild Thornberrys, The New Woody Woodpecker Show, The Oblongs, Courage the Cowardly Dog, Clifford's Really Big Movie), producer (Attack of the Killer Tomatoes, Space Cats, Bonkers, Fantastic Four) and director (Filmation, Garbage Pail Kids, Teenage Mutant Ninja Turtles, Disney Television Animation, Biker Mice from Mars, Iron Man, The Incredible Hulk, Dexter's Laboratory), dies at age 78.
- August 22: Dwi Koendoro, Indonesian comics artist, animator (made an animated series based on his comics series Legenda Sawung Kampret) and film producer (head of Indonesian Animation Association), dies at age 78.
- August 27: Pedro Bell, American illustrator, animator and comics artist (once made an animated short starring his character Larry Lazer), dies at age 69.
- August 30:
  - Valerie Harper, American actress (voice of various characters in The Simpsons, Townspeople in the Sorcerous Stabber Orphen episode "The Sword of Baltanders", Maryellen and Librarian in the As Told by Ginger episode "The Wedding Frame", IHOP Diner in the American Dad! episode "Cock of the Sleepwalk", additional voices in Generator Gawl), dies from lung cancer at age 80.
  - Gordon Bressack, American television producer and writer (Hanna-Barbera, Bionic Six, DuckTales, DIC Entertainment, Warner Bros. Animation, Teenage Mutant Ninja Turtles, Darkwing Duck, Mighty Max, Fat Dog Mendoza, The Adventures of Jimmy Neutron, Boy Genius, WordGirl, The Twisted Whiskers Show, Octonauts, creator of Captain Simian & the Space Monkeys), dies at age 68.
- August 31: Michael Lindsay, American voice actor (voice of Kisuke Urahara in Bleach, Bobby in The Grim Adventures of Billy & Mandy, episode "Whatever Happened to Billy Whatsisname?", Cop in Squirrel Boy, Shinichiro Tamaki in Code Geass), dies at age 56.

=== September ===
- September 4:
  - Dai Tielang, Singaporean-Chinese animator and film director (Black Cat Detective, A Deer of Nine Colors, Little Tadpoles Looking for Mama), dies at age 88.
  - Ernie Elicanal, American animator and storyboard artist (Scooby-Doo! and the Reluctant Werewolf, The Rugrats Movie, The Wild Thornberrys Movie, Tutenstein, The Simpsons Movie, The Simpsons), dies at an unknown age.
- September 7: Robert Axelrod, American actor (voice of Lord Zedd and Finster in Mighty Morphin Power Rangers, Microchip in Spider-Man, Wizardmon and Vademon in Digimon: Digital Monsters), dies at age 70.
- September 13: Eddie Money, American singer and songwriter (performed the theme song of Quack Pack, composed the tracks "Baby Hold On" which was used in the Bob's Burgers episode "O.T.: The Outside Toilet", and "Two Tickets to Paradise" which was used in The Simpsons episode "Homer Loves Flanders" and the King of the Hill episode "Enrique-cilable Differences"), dies from esophageal cancer at age 70.
- September 22: J. Michael Mendel, American television producer (The Simpsons, The Critic, The PJs, The Oblongs, Kid Notorious, Drawn Together, Lil' Bush, Sit Down, Shut Up, Good Vibes, Napoleon Dynamite, Rick and Morty, Solar Opposites), dies at age 54.
- September 30: Marshall Efron, American actor (voice of Ratso in The Kwicky Koala Show, Sloppy Smurf in The Smurfs, Mooch in The Biskitts, Fat Cat in Kidd Video, Stanley in Fluppy Dogs, Hun-Gurrr in The Transformers, Deputroll Flake in Trollkins, Synonymess Botch in Twice Upon a Time, the Earl of Sandwich in the Time Squad episode "A Sandwich by Any Other Name"), dies at age 81.

=== October ===
- October 2: Alan Zaslove, American animator and animation producer (UPA, Hanna-Barbera, Walt Disney Animation Studios), dies at age 91.
- October 6: Rip Taylor, American actor and comedian (voice of The Grump in Here Comes The Grump, Gene the Genie in DuckTales the Movie: Treasure of the Lost Lamp, Larry in The Grim Adventures of Billy & Mandy episode "Anger Management", Uncle Fester in The Addams Family, and Captain Kiddie in Tom and Jerry: The Movie), dies at age 88. His ashes were scattered at sea in Hawaii.
- October 11:
  - Robert Forster, American actor (voice of Major Forsberg in Todd McFarlane's Spawn, The President in Justice League Unlimited, Jack J. Kurtzman in Teenage Mutant Ninja Turtles, Jack Chapman and Police Officer in the Godzilla: The Series episode "Wedding Bells Blew", Lucky Jim in The Simpsons episode "Sex, Pies and Idiot Scrapes", General Bryce in the Transformers: Prime episode "Grill"), dies from brain cancer at age 78.
  - Ram Mohan, Indian animator (You Said It, Fire Games), director (co-director of Ramayana: The Legend of Prince Rama, Meena) and animation producer (Ram Mohan Biographics), dies at age 88.
- October 21: Bengt Feldreich, Swedish television presentator, journalist and voice actor (the narrator in From All of Us to All of You), dies at age 94.
- October 22: Craig Gardner, American background artist (Wild West C.O.W.-Boys of Moo Mesa, Mega Man, Iron Man, Fantastic Four, Darkstalkers, The Real Adventures of Jonny Quest, Captain Simian & the Space Monkeys, Scooby-Doo on Zombie Island, Nickelodeon Animation Studio, RoboCop: Alpha Commando, Harvey Birdman, Attorney at Law, Ozzy & Drix, Tom and Jerry: The Fast and the Furry), dies at an unknown age.
- October 26: Robert Evans, American film producer, studio executive and actor (co-creator, producer and voice of the title character in Kid Notorious, himself in The Simpsons episode "Kill the Alligator and Run"), dies at age 89.
- October 29: John Witherspoon, American actor and comedian (voice of Dad in Waynehead, Oran Jones in The Proud Family, Robert Freeman in The Boondocks, S. Ward Smith in Randy Cunningham: 9th Grade Ninja, Scofflaw in the Happily Ever After: Fairy Tales for Every Child episode "The Prince and the Pauper", Wayne in the Kim Possible episode "Rewriting History", Jimmy in the Animals episode "Squirrels", Franco Aplenty in the BoJack Horseman episode "Surprise"), dies from a heart attack at age 77.

=== November ===
- November 5: Laurel Griggs, American child actress (voice of Stella, Crab Sprout 1 & 2 and Crab Kid in Bubble Guppies), dies from an asthma attack at age 13.

=== December ===
- December 6: Ron Leibman, American actor (voice of Ron Cadillac in Archer, Rabbi in the Rugrats episode "Chanukah", Geofredo in the Duckman episode "Papa Oom M.O.W. M.O.W."), dies from pneumonia at age 82.
- December 8:
  - René Auberjonois, American actor (voice of Chef Louis in The Little Mermaid franchise, Marsupilami, and the House of Mouse episode "Goofy's Menu Magic", the Skull in The Last Unicorn, DeSaad in Super Friends, Mark Desmond in Young Justice, Azmuth in Ben 10: Omniverse, Ebony Maw in Avengers Assemble, Pepe Le Pew in The Looney Tunes Show, Odo in Stewie Griffin: The Untold Story), dies from lung cancer at age 79.
  - Caroll Spinney, American puppeteer (Sesame Street), voice actor, comics artist and animator (Crazy Crayons), dies at age 85.
- December 12: Albert Jelenic, Croatian-born American voice actor and father of Michael Jelenic (voiced himself in the Teen Titans Go! episodes "The Self-Indulgent 200th Episode Spectacular", "The Power of Shrimps", and "Where Exactly on the Globe Is Carl Sanpedro"), dies at age 75.
- December 14: Lord Tim Hudson, English DJ and voice actor (voice of Dizzy in The Jungle Book, Hit Cat in The Aristocats), dies at age 79.
- December 25:
  - Patricia Alice Albrecht, American actress, writer and poet (voice of Phyllis "Pizzazz" Gabor in Jem), dies at age 66.
  - Lee Mendelson, American animation producer (Peanuts, Here Comes Garfield, Garfield on the Town, The Romance of Betty Boop, Garfield and Friends), dies from lung cancer at age 86.
- December 27: Jack Sheldon, American jazz trumpeter, singer (Schoolhouse Rock!, performed the song "Take the Money and Run" in Teacher's Pet) and actor (voice of The Sensitive Male, The President, Chef and Traffic Cop in Johnny Bravo, The Amendment in The Simpsons episode "The Day the Violence Died", 'Vagina Junction' Conductor and The Bill in the Family Guy episodes "Running Mates" and "Mr. Griffin Goes to Washington"), dies at age 88.

== See also ==
- 2019 in anime
- List of animated television series of 2019
