= 2019 in Japanese television =

Events in 2019 in Japanese television.

== Events ==
Date	Event	Source
January 3	A broadcast of Anata ga shuyaku - 50 Voice discussing Idaten is preempted by a special news bulletin about an earthquake in Kumamoto Prefecture. It is rebroadcast on January 5.	
January 6	Six new reporters debut on TV Asahi's morning talk show Good Morning Asahi, including NMB48's Karin Kojima.	
January 6	Tomoaki Ogura returns to Tokudane! after bladder cancer surgery.	
January 9	In the narration of this day's edition, TBS's Wednesday's Downtown apologizes for the confusion involved in the December 26 edition last year involving Yasuda Dai Circus.	
January 10	Eimi Tamamaki will succeed Yurie Toyosaki as the announcer of Purebato.	
February 12	Seiyu Nanako Mori announces her marriage to a person independent of her industry.	
February 13	Motivated by the Me Too movement, voice actress Hiroko Konishi shares in a news article that she was blacklisted from the voice acting industry for refusing to enter a mixed bath with anime director Akitaro Daichi inside.	
April 2	NHK's Utacon changes their timeslot to Tuesday at 19:57 JST. Sarameshi has been planned to precede the Utacon.	
April 27	Two Pretty Cure fans receive an engagement thanks from Yōko Honna, who voices Nagisa Misumi/Cure Black in the inaugural Futari wa Pretty Cure and its sequel Max Heart.	
April 28–May 1	NHK, NNN, ANN, JNN, FNN, and TXN preempt regularly scheduled programs to air coverage of the 2019 Japanese imperial transition.	
May 1	During a session of the Parliament of the United Kingdom where executives from Facebook and Twitter appear before the Parliamentary Joint Committee on Human Rights and face accusations over the way they handled abuse and harassment of parliamentarians on social media, Scottish National Party Member of Parliament Joanna Cherry cites, among several abusive tweets that were not removed swiftly by Twitter, one involving Lily Hoshikawa, a transgender character in the anime Zombie Land Saga.	
May 31	Xebec ceases operations after 24 years due to its sale to Production IG.	
June 20	I Will Not Work Overtime, Period! attracts international attention for its depiction of Japanese workplace culture.	
June 23	On her 30th birthday, voice actress Ayana Taketatsu (Leafa in Sword Art Online) announces marriage with Yūki Kaji (Issei in High School DxD).	
July 18	33 deaths and dozen injured in an arson attack at Kyoto Animation.	
August 22	Ayahi Takagaki, a seiyu and member of the Sphere idol unit, announces her marriage on her blog.	
October 5	The death of a hospitalized woman, which a separate report states was caused by septic shock, brings the death toll of the Kyoto Animation arson attack almost three months earlier to 36.	
October 5	A The Rising of the Shield Hero crossover with the second season of Isekai Quartet is announced at an event.	
October 13	The 2019 Formula One World Championship is held at 2019 Japanese Grand Prix.	
October 20	The 2019 MotoGP World Championship is held at 2019 Japanese motorcycle Grand Prix.	

== Ongoing ==
Show	Type	Channel	First aired/Japanese period		Source
NHK
NHK Amateur Song Contest	Talent Show	NHK-G, NHK World Premium	March 15, 1953 (TV)	Showa	
With Mother	Kids	E-TV, NHK World Premium	October 5, 1959	Showa	
Nintama Rantarō	Anime	NHK	April 10, 1993	Heisei	
Ojarumaru	Anime	NHK	October 5, 1998	Heisei	
Utacon	Music	NHK-G, NHK World Premium	April 12, 2016	Heisei	
Nippon Television
Soreike! Anpanman	Anime	Nippon Television	October 3, 1988	Showa	
Downtown no Gaki no Tsukai ya Arahende!!	Game-Show	Nippon Television	October 3, 1989	Heisei	
Detective Conan	Anime	NNS	January 8, 1996	Heisei	
Fuji Television
Music Fair	Music	Fuji Television	August 31, 1964	Showa	
Sazae-san	Anime	Fuji Television	October 5, 1969	Showa	
FNS Music Festival	Music	Fuji Television	July 2, 1974	Showa	
Chibi Maruko-chan	Anime	Fuji Television	January 8, 1995	Heisei	
GeGeGe no Kitaro	Anime	Fuji Television	April 1, 2018	Heisei	
One Piece	Anime	Fuji Television	October 20, 1999	Heisei	
TV Tokyo
Black Clover	Anime	TV Tokyo	October 3, 2017	Heisei	
Aikatsu on Parade!	Anime	TV Tokyo	October 5, 2019	Reiwa	
Boruto: Naruto Next Generations	Anime	TV Tokyo	April 5, 2017	Heisei	
Yu-Gi-Oh! VRAINS	Anime	TV Tokyo	May 10, 2017	Heisei	
Kiratto Pri Chan	Anime	TV Tokyo	April 8, 2018	Heisei	
Yo-kai Watch!	Anime	TV Tokyo	April 5, 2019	Heisei	
Ace of Diamond Act II	Anime	TV Tokyo	April 2, 2019	Heisei	
TV Asahi
Super Hero Time	Tokusatsu	TV Asahi	September 28, 2003	Heisei	
Panel Quiz Attack 25	Game-Show	TV Asahi	April 6, 1975	Showa	
Crayon Shin-chan	Anime	TV Asahi	April 13, 1992	Heisei	
Doraemon	Anime	TV Asahi	April 15, 2005	Heisei	
Music Station	Music	TV Asahi	October 24, 1986	Showa	
Tokyo Broadcasting System
SASUKE	Sports	Tokyo Broadcasting System	September 26, 1997	Heisei	
Count Down TV	Music	Tokyo Broadcasting System	April 7, 1993	Heisei	

== New series and returning shows ==
Show	Network	Premiere	Finale	Status	Source
Boogiepop and Others	Tokyo MX	January 4, 2019	March 29, 2019	Series Ended	
The Price of Smiles	Tokyo MX	January 4, 2019	March 22, 2019	Series Ended	
Mini Toji	Tokyo MX	January 5, 2019	March 16, 2019	Series Ended	
Ultraman New Generation Chronicle	TV Tokyo	January 5, 2019	June 29, 2019	Series Ended	
W'z	Tokyo MX	January 5, 2019	March 30, 2019	Series Ended	
Idaten	NHK G	January 6, 2019	December 15, 2019	Series Ended	
How Clumsy you are, Miss Ueno	Tokyo MX	January 6, 2019	March 24, 2019	Series Ended	
Dororo	Tokyo MX	January 7, 2019	June 24, 2019	Series Ended	
Kemono Friends 2	TV Tokyo	January 7, 2019	April 1, 2019	Series Ended	
Trace ~Kasouken no Otoko~	Fuji TV/FNS	January 7, 2019	March 18, 2019	Series Ended	
Circlet Princess	Tokyo MX	January 8, 2019	March 26, 2019	Series Ended	
Kakegurui – Compulsive Gambler	Tokyo MX	January 8, 2019	March 26, 2019	Series Ended	
Pastel Memories	Tokyo MX	January 8, 2019	March 26, 2019	Series Ended	
Rainy Cocoa side G	Tokyo MX	January 8, 2019	March 26, 2019	Series Ended	
Wataten!: An Angel Flew Down to Me	Tokyo MX	January 8, 2019	March 26, 2019	Series Ended	
The Rising of the Shield Hero	AT-X	January 9, 2019	June 26, 2019	Series Ended	
Kemurikusa	Tokyo MX / Amazon	January 9, 2019	March 27, 2019	Series Ended	
Meiji Tokyo Renka	Tokyo MX	January 9, 2019	March 27, 2019	Series Ended	
My Roommate Is a Cat	ABC	January 9, 2019	March 27, 2019	Series Ended	
Your Home is My Business! 2nd Attack	Nippon TV, NNS	January 9, 2019	March 13, 2019	Series Ended	
Dimension High School	Tokyo MX	January 10, 2019	March 28, 2019	Series Ended	
Girly Air Force	AT-X	January 10, 2019	March 28, 2019	Series Ended	
Grimms Notes	TBS	January 10, 2019	March 2, 2019	Series Ended	
The Quintessential Quintuplets (season 1)	TBS	January 10, 2019	March 28, 2019	Season Ended; Renewed for 2nd Season	
Revisions (TV series)	Fuji TV	January 10, 2019	March 28, 2019	Series Ended	
Snandal Lawyer - QUEEN	Fuji TV, FNS	January 10, 2019	March 14, 2019	Series Ended	
B-Project～Zecchō＊Emotion～	Tokyo MX	January 11, 2019	March 29, 2019	Season Ended	
Date A Live (season 3)	Tokyo MX	January 11, 2019	March 29, 2019	Season Ended	
Hulaing Babies	TV Tokyo	January 11, 2019	March 29, 2019	Series Ended	
The Promised Neverland	Fuji TV	January 11, 2019	March 29, 2019	Season Ended; Renewed for 2nd Season	
Maison de Police	TBS, JNN	January 11, 2019	March 15, 2019	Series Ended	
Domestic Girlfriend	TBS	January 12, 2019	March 30, 2019	Series Ended	
Endro!	Tokyo MX	January 12, 2019	March 30, 2019	Series Ended	
Kaguya-sama: Love Is War	Tokyo MX	January 12, 2019	March 30, 2019	Series Ended	
Magical Girl Spec-Ops Asuka	JNN	January 12, 2019	March 30, 2019	Series Ended	
Bermuda Triangle: Colorful Pastrale	Tokyo MX	January 13, 2019	March 30, 2019	Series Ended	
The Magnificent Kotobuki	Tokyo MX	January 13, 2019	March 31, 2019	Series Ended	
The Good Wife	TBS/JNN	January 13, 2019	March 17, 2019	Series Ended	
Tokusatsu Gagaga	NHK	January 18, 2019	March 1, 2019	Series Ended	
nnocence, Fight Against False Charges	Nippon TV, ytv, NNS	January 19, 2019	March 23, 2019	Series Ended	
Manaria Friends	Tokyo MX	January 20, 2019	March 24, 2019	Series Ended	
Star Twinkle PreCure	TV Asahi	February 3, 2019	January 26, 2020	Ending 2020	
Super Sentai Strongest Battle	TV Asahi	February 17, 2019	March 10, 2019	Series Ended	
Kishiryu Sentai Ryusoulger	TV Asahi	March 17, 2019	March 1, 2020	Ending 2020	
Channel wa sono mama!	HTB / Netflix	March 18, 2019	March 22, 2019	Series Ended	
Natsuzora	NHK	April 1, 2019	September 28, 2019	Series Ended	
Ace of Diamond Act II	TV Tokyo	April 2, 2019	March 31, 2020	Season Ended	
YU-NO: A Girl Who Chants Love at the Bound of this World	AT-X	April 2, 2019	October 1, 2019	Series Ended	
Bakumatsu Crisis	TBS	April 4, 2019	June 20, 2019	Series Ended	
Yatogame-chan Kansatsu Nikki	Tokyo MX	April 4, 2019	June 20, 2019	Season Ended; Renewed for 2nd Season	
Yo-kai Watch!	TV Tokyo	April 5, 2019	December 20, 2019	Series Ended	
Hitori Bocchi no Marumaru Seikatsu	TBS	April 5, 2019	June 21, 2019	Series Ended	
Demon Slayer: Kimetsu no Yaiba	Tokyo MX	April 6, 2019	September 28, 2019	Season Ended	
Fruits Basket	TV Tokyo	April 6, 2019	September 21, 2019	Season Ended; Renewed for 2nd Season	
Joshi Kausei	Tokyo MX	April 6, 2019	June 22, 2019	Series Ended	
Kono Oto Tomare! Sounds of Life	Tokyo MX	April 6, 2019	December 28, 2019	Series Ended	
Mix	NTV	April 6, 2019	September 28, 2019	Series Ended	
Nobunaga teacher's young bride	Tokyo MX	April 6, 2019	June 22, 2019	Series Ended	
Over Drive Girl 1/6	Tokyo MX	April 6, 2019	June 22, 2019	Series Ended	
Senryu Girl	TBS	April 6, 2019	June 22, 2019	Series Ended	
What Did You Eat Yesterday?	TV Tokyo	April 6, 2019	June 29, 2019	Series Ended	
Afterlost	Tokyo MX	April 7, 2019	June 23, 2019	Series Ended	
Gunjō no Magmell	Tokyo MX	April 7, 2019	June 30, 2019	Series Ended	
Hachigatsu no Cinderella Nine	TV Tokyo	April 7, 2019	July 7, 2019	Series Ended	
Midnight Occult Civil Servants	Tokyo MX	April 7, 2019	June 23, 2019	Series Ended	
Secret × Heroine Phantomirage!	TV Tokyo	April 7, 2019	June 28, 2020	Ending 2020	
We Never Learn: Bokuben	Tokyo MX, MBS	April 7, 2019	December 29, 2019	Series Ended	
Fairy Gone	Tokyo MX	April 7, 2019	December 22, 2019	Series Ended	
RobiHachi	Tokyo MX	April 8, 2019	June 24, 2019	Series Ended	
I'm From Japan	TV Tokyo	April 8, 2019	June 24, 2019	Series Ended	
Why the Hell are You Here, Teacher!?	Tokyo MX	April 8, 2019	June 24, 2019	Series Ended	
Isekai Quartet	Tokyo MX	April 9, 2019	June 25, 2019	Season Ended; Renewed for 2nd Season	
Strike Witches: 501st Joint Fighter Wing Take Off!	Tokyo MX	April 9, 2019	June 25, 2019	Series Ended	
Carole & Tuesday	Fuji TV / Netflix	April 10, 2019	October 2, 2019	Series Ended	
The Helpful Fox Senko-san	Tokyo MX	April 10, 2019	June 26, 2019	Series Ended	
Wise Man's Grandchild	Tokyo MX	April 10, 2019	June 26, 2019	Series Ended	
Nurse in Action!!	Nippon TV, ytv, NNS	April 10, 2019	June 19, 2019	Season Ended	
Sarazanmai	Fuji TV	April 11, 2019	June 20, 2019	Series Ended	
Strwaberry Night Saga	Fuji TV, kantere, FNS	April 11, 2019	June 20, 2019	Season Ended	
In Hand	TBS, MBS, JNN	April 12, 2019	June 21, 2019	Season Ended	
King of Prism: Shiny Seven Stars	TV Tokyo	April 15, 2019	July 1, 2019	Series Ended	
Mobile Suit Gundam: The Origin	NHK	April 29, 2019	August 12, 2019	Series Ended	
Shingeki no Kyojin – Season 3: Part 2	NHK	April 29, 2019	July 1, 2019	Season Ended; Renewed for 4th and final Season	
Cardfight!! Vanguard: High School Arc Cont.	TV Tokyo	May 11, 2019	August 10, 2019	Season Ended	
Ao-chan Can't Study!	MBS, TBS, BS-TBS	April 6, 2019	June 22, 2019	Series Ended	
To the Abandoned Sacred Beasts	Tokyo MX/MBS	July 1, 2019	September 16, 2019	Series Ended	
Are You Lost?	Tokyo MX, MBS, BS-NTV	July 2, 2019	September 17, 2019	Series Ended	
Astra Lost in Space	Tokyo MX	July 3, 2019	September 18, 2019	Series Ended	
How Heavy Are the Dumbbells You Lift?	Tokyo MX	July 3, 2019	September 18, 2019	Series Ended	
Demon Lord, Retry!	Tokyo MX	July 4, 2019	September 19, 2019	Series Ended	
If It's for My Daughter, I'd Even Defeat a Demon Lord	Tokyo MX	July 4, 2019	September 19, 2019	Series Ended	
Dr. Stone	Tokyo MX	July 5, 2019	December 13, 2019	Season Ended; Renewed for 2nd Season	
Fire Force	JNN	July 5, 2019	December 28, 2019	Season Ended; Renewed for 2nd Season	
Granbelm	TBS	July 5, 2019	September 26, 2019	Series Ended	
O Maidens in Your Savage Season	TBS	July 5, 2019	September 20, 2019	Series Ended	
Wasteful Days of High School Girls	Tokyo MX	July 5, 2019	September 20, 2019	Series Ended	
Senki Zesshō Symphogear XV	Tokyo MX	July 6, 2019	September 28, 2019	Series Ended	
The Case Files of Lord El-Melloi II	Tokyo MX	July 6, 2019	September 28, 2019	Series Ended	
Ultraman Taiga	TV Tokyo	July 6, 2019	December 28, 2019	Series Ended	
Ensemble Stars!	Tokyo MX	July 7, 2019	December 22, 2019	Series Ended	
Re:Stage!	Tokyo MX/BS Fuji	July 7, 2019	September 29, 2019	Series Ended	
The Ones Within	Tokyo MX	July 7, 2019	September 22, 2019	Series Ended	
Vinland Saga	NHK	July 7, 2019	December 29, 2019	Season Ended; Renewed for 2nd Season	
Arifureta: From Commonplace to World's Strongest	Tokyo MX	July 8, 2019	October 21, 2019	Season Ended; Renewed for 2nd Season	
Cop Craft	Tokyo MX	July 8, 2019	September 30, 2019	Series Ended	
Hensuki: Are you willing to fall in love with a pervert, as long as she's a cutie?	Tokyo MX	July 8, 2019	September 23, 2019	Series Ended	
Isekai Cheat Magician	Tokyo MX	July 10, 2019	September 25, 2019	Series Ended	
The Demon Girl Next Door	TBS	July 11, 2019	September 26, 2019	Season Ended; Renewed for 2nd Season	
Given	Fuji TV	July 11, 2019	September 19, 2019	Series Ended	
A Certain Scientific Accelerator	Tokyo MX	July 12, 2019	September 27, 2019	Series Ended	
Dungeon ni Deai - Season 2	Tokyo MX	July 12, 2019	September 28, 2019	Season Ended; Renewed for 3rd Season	
Do You Love Your Mom and Her Two-Hit Multi-Target Attacks?	Tokyo MX	July 13, 2019	September 28, 2019	Series Ended	
BEM	TV Tokyo	July 14, 2019	October 13, 2019	Series Ended	
Try Knights	Nippon Television	July 30, 2019	October 15, 2019	Series Ended	
Cardfight!! Vanguard: Shinemon	TV Tokyo	August 24, 2019	March 28, 2020	Series Ended	
Kamen Rider Zero-One	TV Asahi	September 1, 2019	August 30, 2020	Series Ended	
Scarlet	NHK	September 30, 2019	March 28, 2020	Series Ended	
Ahiru no Sora	TV Tokyo	October 2, 2019	September 30, 2020	Ending 2020	
Ascendance of a Bookworm	Tokyo MX	October 2, 2019	December 26, 2019	Season Ended; Renewed for 2nd Season	
Hataage! Kemonomichi	Tokyo MX	October 2, 2019	December 18, 2019	Series Ended	
Hōkago Saikoro Club	Tokyo MX	October 2, 2019	December 19, 2019	Series Ended	
The Hero is Overpowered but Overly Cautious	AT-X	October 2, 2019	December 27, 2019	Series Ended	
Ore o Suki nano wa Omae dake kayo	Tokyo MX	October 3, 2019	December 26, 2019	Series Ended	
High School Prodigies Have It Easy Even In Another World	Tokyo MX	October 3, 2019	December 19, 2019	Series Ended	
Granblue Fantasy The Animation: Season 2	Tokyo MX	October 4, 2019	December 27, 2019	Season Ended	
Zoids Wild Zero	TV Tokyo	October 4, 2019	October 16, 2020	Ending 2020	
Aikatsu on Parade!	TV Tokyo	October 5, 2019	March 28, 2020	Ending 2020	
Fate/Grand Order - Absolute Demonic Front: Babylonia	Tokyo MX	October 5, 2019	March 21, 2020	Ending 2020	
Val × Love	AT-X	October 5, 2019	December 21, 2019	Series Ended	
Mairimashita! Iruma-kun	NHK	October 5, 2019	March 7, 2020	Season Ended; Renewed for 2nd Season	
Special Crime Investigation Unit Special 7	AT-X	October 6, 2019	December 29, 2019	Series Ended	
Phantasy Star Online 2: Episode Oracle	Tokyo MX	October 7, 2019	March 30, 2020	Ending 2020	
Didn't I Say to Make My Abilities Average in the Next Life?!	Tokyo MX	October 7, 2019	December 23, 2019	Series Ended	
Z/X	TV Tokyo	October 8, 2019	December 24, 2019	Series Ended	
Beastars	Fuji TV / Netflix	October 9, 2019	December 26, 2019	Season Ended; Renewed for 2nd Season	
The Seven Deadly Sins: Wrath of the Gods	TV Tokyo	October 9, 2019	March 25, 2020	Ending 2020	
Assassin's Pride	Tokyo MX, BS NTV, AT-X	October 10, 2019	December 26, 2019	Series Ended	
No Guns Life	TBS	October 11, 2019	Currently Airing	Continues 2020	
Stars Align	TBS	October 10, 2019	December 26, 2019	Series Ended	
Shokugeki no Soma - Season 4	Tokyo MX	October 11, 2019	December 27, 2019	Season Ended	
Case File nº221: Kabukicho	TBS	October 11, 2019	March 27, 2020	Ending 2020	
Boku no Hero Academia – Season 4	Nippon Television	October 12, 2019	April 4, 2020	Ending 2020	
Sword Art Online: Alicization - Part 2: War of the Underworld	Tokyo MX	October 12, 2019		Season Paused; To be resumed April 2020	
Chihayafuru	Nippon TV	October 22, 2019	April 24, 2020	Ending 2020	
Psycho-Pass 3	Fuji TV	October 24, 2019	December 12, 2019	Season Ended	
Pokémon (2019 series)	TV Tokyo	November 17, 2019	Currently Airing	Continues 2020	
Levius	Netflix	November 28, 2019	November 18, 2019	Season Ended	
Yo-kai Watch Jam: Yo-kai Academy Y: Encounter with N	TV Tokyo	December 27, 2019	Currently Airing	Continues 2020	

== Ending ==
End date	Show	Channel	First aired	Replaced by	Source
January 27	Hug! Pretty Cure	TV Asahi	February 4, 2018	Star Twinkle PreCure	
February 10	Kaitou Sentai Lupinranger VS Keisatsu Sentai Patranger	TV Asahi	February 11, 2018	Super Sentai Strongest Battle	
March 10	Super Sentai Strongest Battle	TV Asahi	February 17, 2019	Kishiryu Sentai Ryusoulger	
March 24	Magical × Heroine Magimajo Pures!	TV Tokyo	April 1, 2018	Secret × Heroine Phantomirage!	
March 24	AKB48 Show!	NHK	October 5, 2013	Anime Song Premium	
March 29	Yo-kai Watch Shadowside	TV Tokyo	April 13, 2018	Yo-kai Watch!	
March 30	Manpuku	NHK	October 1, 2018	Natsuzora	
March 30	Sword Art Online: Alicization - Part 1	Tokyo MX	October 6, 2018	Zoku Owarimonogatari & Monogatari Series Selection	
March 31	Layton Mystery Tanteisha: Katori no Nazotoki File	Fuji Television	April 8, 2018	Nichiyō Hōdō The Prime	
July 28	JoJo's Bizarre Adventure: Golden Wind	Tokyo MX	October 5, 2018	Unnamed Anime	
August 25	Kamen Rider Zi-O	TV Asahi	September 2, 2018	Kamen Rider Zero-One	
September 24	AKBingo!	Nippon Television	October 1, 2008	Nenaino? Osanai Sankyōdai	
September 25	Yu-Gi-Oh! VRAINS	TV Tokyo	May 10, 2017	Ahiru no Sora	
September 26	Aikatsu Friends!	TV Tokyo	April 5, 2018	Aikatsu on Parade!	
September 26	Kira Kira Happy Hirake! Cocotama	TV Tokyo	September 6, 2018	Preschool Time	
September 27	Inazuma Eleven: Orion no Kokuin	TV Tokyo	October 5, 2018	Zoids Wild Zero	
September 28	Natsuzora	NHK	April 1, 2019	Scarlet	
September 28	Mix	Nippon Television	April 6, 2019	My Hero Academia	
September 29	Fairy Tail: The Final Series	TV Tokyo	October 7, 2018	PAW Patrol	
November 3	Pokémon Sun & Moon	TV Tokyo	November 17, 2016	Pokémon (2019 series)	
December 15	Idaten	NHK	January 6, 2019	Kirin ga Kuru	
December 20	Yo-kai Watch!	TV Tokyo	April 5, 2019	Yo-kai Watch Jam: Yo-kai Academy Y: Encounter with N	

== Sports ==
Airdate	Sports	Network	Source
October 13	2019 Formula One World Championship	Fuji TV Next	
October 20	2019 MotoGP World Championship	G+	

== Special events and milestone episodes ==
Airdate	Show	Episode	Network	Source
January 1	Tokyo Friend Park 2	Hiroshi Sekiguchi's Tokyo Friend Park Drama Daishūgō SP!!	TBS	
January 3	Keisuke Kuwata's Let's Go Bowling Japan-US All-Star Chōjō Kessen!		TV Tokyo	
January 9	Ken Shimura's Bakatono-sama	Annual New Year Special	Fuji Television	
January 14	The 8th AKB48 GROUP Kouhaku Taikou Utagassen		BS Sky Perfect	
February 1	Music Station Special: TV Asahi 60th Anniversary		TV Asahi	
February 17	Good Night Japan: Etsuko Ichihara Thanksgiving Special		NHK	
March 2	NHK Nodojiman: The Final Heisei Champion Taikai 2019		NHK	
March 17	Fairy Tail	#300: "Historia of Corpses"	TV Tokyo	
March 23	Sakamichi TV		NHK	
March 31	Boruto: Naruto Next Generations	#100: "The Predestined Path"	TV Tokyo	
April 29	Soukessan! Heisei Kōhaku Uta Gassen		NHK	
April 30	Old Era, New Era: The Last Day of Heisei (3-Part Special)		NHK	
May 1	Yu-Gi-Oh! VRAINS	#100: "Twisted Utopia"	TV Tokyo	
June 26	TV Tokyo Music Festival 2019		TV Tokyo	
July 6	The Music Day 2019: Jidai		Nippon Television	
July 13	Onkagu no Hi 2019		TBS	
July 24	2020 Stadium (featuring Arashi)		NHK	
July 24	FNS Uta no Natsu Matsuri 2019		Fuji Television	
August 24 & 25	24 Hour Television 2019		Nippon Television	
September 1	One Piece	#900: "The Greatest Day of My Life! Otama and Her Sweet Red-bean Soup!"	Fuji Television	
September 10	Black Clover	#100: "We Won't Lose To You"	TV Tokyo	
September 29	Last Idol	#100	TV Asahi	
November 2 & 3	FNS 27 Hour TV		Fuji Television	
December 1	Animelo Summer Live 2019: Story	Day 1 - August 30, 2019	BS Premium	
December 4	2019 FNS Music Festival	Part 1	Fuji Television	
December 8	Animelo Summer Live 2019: Story	Day 2 - August 31, 2019	BS Premium	
December 11	2019 FNS Music Festival	Part 2	Fuji Television	
December 15	Animelo Summer Live 2019: Story	Day 3 - September 1, 2019	BS Premium	
December 27	Music Station Ultra Super Live 2019		TV Asahi	
December 30	61st Japan Record Awards		TBS	
December 31	70th NHK Kōhaku Uta Gassen		NHK	
December 31	Johnny's Countdown 2019-2020		Fuji Television	

== Deaths ==
Date	Name	Age	Notable Works	Source
January 5	Takao Ōyama	74	Actor, voice actor	
January 6	Fusako Amachi	78	Actor, voice actor (Little Ghost Q-Taro et al.)	
January 9	Kimihiro Reizei	71	Actor, theater director	
January 12	Etsuko Ichihara	82	Actor	
February 1	Kinryū Arimoto	78	Voice actor, most notable for the voice roles from Bleach, One Piece and Gundam Seed.	
February 9	Junya Sato	86	Director	
February 12	Sumiko Yamada	73	Actor	
February 19	Sumie Sasaki	90	Actor	
February 22	Matsunosuke Shōfukutei	93	Rakugo, tarento	
February 23	Ju Bion	59	Actor, singer	
February 26	Yasuta Sato	94	Founder of Takara Tomy, collaborating to BeyBlade, Pretty Rhythm, Ryukendo and others.	
February 28	Genshū Hanayagi	77	Dancer, actress, writer, feminist	
March 7	Shien (actor)	41	Actor, enka singer	
March 17	Yuya Uchida	79	Singer and songwriter; performed with Rino Sashihara in AKB48 Show!	
March 18	Junkichi Orimoto	92	Actor	
March 26	Fuyumi Shiraishi	82	Actor, voice actor, radio announcer	
March 26	Kenichi Hagiwara	68	Actor, singer	
April 5	Wowaka	31	Lead vocals and guitars from Hitorie; performed "Polaris", one of ending themes from anime series Boruto: Naruto Next Generations.	
April 8	Casey Takamine	85	Tarento	
April 11	Monkey Punch	81	Creator of his notable success Lupin III and Cinderella Boy.	
April 11	Osamu Sekita		Episode director (Superbook, Sgt. Frog, Kamiwaza Wanda)	
April 16	Kiyoshi Kawakubo	89	Seiyuu	
May 4	s@ko	44	Local tarento	
May 12	Machiko Kyō	95	Actor	
May 15	Yōko Sugi	90	Actor	
May 19	Susumu Kimura (owarai)	68	Actor, owarai	
May 27	Akiho Nakamori	52	Actor	
June 10	Yuzuru Fujimoto	83	Seiyu	
June 12	Masahiro Kunii	74	Actor (Oretachi wa Tenshi da!, Kamen Rider)	
June 13	Nobuyuki Ishida	68	Actor	
June 14	SNOB Yuka of SNOB	54	Owarai comedian	
June 26	Tadao Takashima	88	Actor	
July 7	Katsumi Itou	87	Actor, seiyuu	
July 9	Johnny Kitagawa	87	Music producer, founder of Johnny & Associates	
July 12	Arisu Jun	66	Tarento, actor, mother of Ryōsuke Miura	
July 18	Naomi Ishida	49	Colorist	
July 18	Yasuhiro Takemoto	47	Director	
July 18	Yoshiji Kigami	61	Animator, director, and storyboarder	
July 18	Futoshi Nishiya	37	Animator, director, and character designer	
July 28	Yuu Shimaka	70	Actor and voice actor	
August 3	Kazuko Nakamura	86	Animator (Astro Boy)	
August 3	Reiji Kurihara	85	Tarento	
August 3	Makoto Yuasa	84	Actor	
August 3	Naomi Shiraishi	84	Actress	
August 29	Takeo Namai	89	Actor	
September 11	Gō Haraguchi	80	Actor	
September 25	Katsuhiko Sunaga	80	Actor	
October 24	Kaoru Yachigusa	88	Actress (Takarazuka Revue)	
December 4	Yū "masshoi" Yamauchi	37	Drummer from Animelo Summer Live house band; also recorded for Luna Haruna, LiSA, Dempagumi.inc, Ayana Taketatsu, Nana Mizuki, Momoiro Clover Z and others.	
