= Munto =

Anime by Kyoto Animation

- Munto DVD cover
- Genre: Drama, Fantasy, Romance
- Original video animation
- Directed by: Yoshiji Kigami
- Produced by: Yoko Hatta
- Written by: Yoshiji Kigami
- Music by: Shinji Ikeda
- Studio: Kyoto Animation
- Licensed by: NA: Central Park Media (2004-2009)
- Released: March 18, 2003 – April 23, 2005
- Runtime: 52 minutes (ep. 1); 58 minutes (ep. 2)
- Episodes: 2
- Anime television series

Sora o Miageru Shōjo no Hitomi ni Utsuru Sekai
- Directed by: Yoshiji Kigami
- Written by: Yoshiji Kigami
- Music by: Monaca: Satoru Kōsaki
- Studio: Kyoto Animation
- Original network: Chiba TV
- Original run: January 14, 2009 – March 11, 2009
- Episodes: 9
- Anime film

Tenjōbito to Akutobito Saigo no Tatakai
- Directed by: Yoshiji Kigami
- Produced by: Atsushi Itō; Hideaki Hatta
- Written by: Yoshiji Kigami
- Music by: Monaca: Satoru Kōsaki
- Studio: Kyoto Animation
- Released: April 18, 2009
- Runtime: 83 minutes
- Manga

Sora o Miageru Shōjo no Hitomi ni Utsuru Sekai
- Written by: Kyoto Animation
- Illustrated by: Makoto 2-gō
- Published by: Kadokawa Shoten
- Magazine: Comp Ace
- Original run: May 2009 – October 2009
- Volumes: 1

Munto (stylized as MUNTO) is a two-episode original video animation (OVA) project by Kyoto Animation, first released in 2003 titled Munto followed by a 2005 sequel Munto: Beyond the Walls of Time. An animated television series entitled Sora o Miageru Shōjo no Hitomi ni Utsuru Sekai based on the OVAs was produced by Kyoto Animation and directed by Yoshiji Kigami. The TV series is a nine-episode remake and continuation of the OVAs, and aired in Japan between January and March 2009 on Chiba TV. The TV series includes an updated director's cut of the OVA episodes with new animation and footage. A manga adaptation of the TV series illustrated by Makoto 2-gō began serialization in the May 2009 issue of Kadokawa Shoten's Comp Ace magazine. An animated film named Tenjōbito to Akutobito Saigo no Tatakai (天上人とアクト人 最後の戦い) was released on April 18, 2009.

== Plot ==
In the distant past of Munto when the world of the Heavens did not exist, humans lived a prosperous civilization. One day, beings of unknown origins fell out of the sky and onto human world. These beings could control a power called Akuto, or human emotions. They could take the human spirit, which is an accretion of feelings, wishes and dreams and turn that into a physical power or physical object. These beings, obsessed with their powers, destroyed the human civilization within a few days. However, they did not realize that the humans created the Akuto; these beings who descended from the skies killed off the very source of their power. They then discovered several alternate universes which they could draw more Akuto from. They depleted all the other dimensions of Akuto and used it to create their own empire in the skies above the humans. This new civilization was known as the Heavens and was populated by the Heavenly Beings who could control Akuto.

The leaders of the Heavens soon grew corrupt due to the unlimited amount of Akuto they had stolen from other planets in other space times, and the Heavens began to collapse into disarray. At this time, the humans launched an attack against the Heavens. They were the very humans that were defeated when the Heavenly Beings first showed up. The humans who supplied the Akuto then defeated the Heavenly Beings. During the battle, the leaders of the Heavens decided to sever the supply of Akuto, cutting themselves away from Earth rather than be killed by the rebelling humans. They sealed themselves into a parallel dimension in order to sever the link of Akuto, though this resulted in the pillars that connected Earth to the Heavens to fall from the sky causing massive destruction. This day was called the "Calamitous Day" when both worlds lost contact with each other. From that day on, the Heavenly Beings considered linking the two dimensions together to be a taboo and appointed a guardian to guard this link to make sure it is never connected again.

In the present day, the Heavens are in disarray due to the lack of Akuto flowing into the Heavens. The Heavens, divided into kingdoms, battle each other. The Magical Kingdom is blamed for using the Akuto the most and the other kingdoms seek to destroy the Magical Kingdom in hopes of preserving what little is left of the Akuto. Should the Heavens be destroyed due to a lack of Akuto, the floating islands in the sky will fall to the Earth and the Heavens and human civilization will perish. The Magical Kingdom is led by their king Munto who believes the only way to save the Heavens from destruction is to seek out Yumemi Hidaka who holds the key to restoring the Akuto to the Heavens.

== Characters ==
=== Terrestrial characters ===
Yumemi Hidaka (日高 ユメミ, Hidaka Yumemi)
Voiced by: Haruna Mima (OVA), Mai Aizawa (TV), Veronica Taylor (English)
Yumemi is the main female character of the story, who at the beginning of the series was the only person who can see the "floating islands in the sky" until her family, friends, and everyone else on Earth started seeing them too. Originally at the age of 5 she was afraid of her ability because it made her different from others, and has learned the hard way that most people couldn't believe what she saw. Because of that, she kept her gift to herself, carrying a pink umbrella to block out the view of the sky. She is a dreamy, quiet, gentle person, with a caring and compassionate personality. Throughout the second OVA, she becomes more confident of who she is, but is still insecure about what she sees because of her special connection with Munto. Because of the connection, she is constantly haunted by images of Munto's past and is confused and distressed as to why she sees them. In the second OVA, Yumemi takes the initiative and becomes more accepting of her gift and role. She is the one to offer her help to Munto in the second OVA. As she grows in age she soon develops feelings for Munto as seen when she blushes.
Ichiko Ono (小野 以知子, Ono Ichiko)
Voiced by: Kayoko Satoi (OVA), Kaori Shimizu (OVA II), Chika Horikawa (TV), Kelly Ray (English)
Yumemi's classmate and childhood friend. Ichiko is a very positive and energetic person. She always encourages Yumemi whenever she feels gloomy and is very protective of her. However, she also seems to have co-dependent tendencies and can be overly controlling due to her own insecurities. She had always wanted to see the islands in the sky Yumemi spoke of, and quietly wished for the day that she would see them. It is revealed that Yumemi begins to carry the umbrella as a result of an outburst of Ichiko when they were younger. Ichiko is especially worried whenever Yumemi's gaze returned to the skies after the first OVA, afraid that the "red man" was going to take Yumemi away somewhere that she could not protect her anymore. She constantly tries to convince Yumemi that Munto and the islands in the sky were a place that they don't belong to. Ichiko's character is shown to be popular and athletic at school, whereas her friends Yumemi and Suzume are called "space-cadet" and "childish".
Suzume Imamura (今村 涼芽, Inamura Suzume)
Voiced by: Ayano Sasaki (OVA I), Rie Kugimiya (OVA II), Hiromi Konno (TV), Jaimie Kelton (OVA I; English) Kether Donohue (OVA II; English)
She is also Yumemi's classmate and childhood friend. She is a very optimistic and cheerful girl who lives at her own pace. She has a rather immature and childish personality, but is always smiling. Though she is a girl with a very soft-spoken nature and childish at that, she often surprises others by her wise words and "outsider-looking-in" view. She is more understanding when Yumemi claims she must go to Munto to help in the second OVA, and helps convince Ichiko that everything was going to be alright. She has a boyfriend named Kazuya who she loves dearly and "marries".
Kazuya Takamori (高森 和也, Takamori Kazuya)
Voiced by: Shōgo Matsui (OVA), Shinya Takahashi (TV), Michael Sinterniklaas (English)
Suzume's boyfriend. A strong boy born to distant parents, Kazuya became a delinquent and a loner to such an extent that, feeling useless, he contemplated suicide. In an attempt to drown himself, Suzume stops him and helps Kazuya learn to appreciate life. He then determines to live strongly. He deeply cares for Suzume and spends much time with her; the always cheery personality that is sometimes found annoying by her peers is what he likes most about her. He "marries" Suzume by crossing a river with her, symbolizing their willingness to face any obstacles in the way of their relationship. It is revealed later that Kazuya is the top student in his grade (as well as best-looking) and was accepted into a prestigious school.
Takashi Tobe (貴志, Takashi)
Voiced by: Hiro Shimono (OVA), Kaoru Mizuhara (TV), Wayne Grayson (English)
A classmate of Yumemi, Ichiko and Suzume, Takashi makes his debut in the second OVA. He is a very bright student with a realistic, dependable, but "fence-sitter" personality. Because he often listens to Ichiko and is shown to admire her on many levels, it is implied that he has a crush on her, but Ichiko herself shows no signs of noticing this. His parents' house is a shrine and Yumemi, Ichiko, and Suzume take a part-time job there as shrine maidens during the second OVA.
Shigeru Hidaka (日高 茂, Hidaka Shigeru)
Voiced by: Masafumi Kimura (OVA II), Hirokazu Hiramatsu (TV), Mike Pollock (English)
Yumemi's father. He works for an advertising industry and usually returns home late from his company. He does not become unsettled easily, which brings a sense of security to his family. He is one who understands his wife's feelings like no other.
Nozomi Hidaka (日高 望, Hidaka Nozomi)
Voiced by: Kinako Kuri (OVA), Asuka Tanii (OVA II), Kikuko Inoue (TV), Lisa Ortiz (English)
A housewife and Yumemi's mother. She sometimes is strict towards her daughter, but with good intention in mind. She fondly watches over her children as they continue to grow, while maintaining a peaceful home. When the Heavenly World became visible in the early summer, the incident had caused Nozomi to look back upon her past. Her relationship with her husband is very strong.
Chikara Hidaka (日高 力, Hidaka Chikara)
Voiced by: Mami Hamada (OVA), Aya Uchida (TV), Sherrie Fell (English)
Yumemi's eight-year-old brother. Although a bit temperamental, he is a bright child who is fond of video games and the popular TV animation program, "Ultra-Montaro."

=== Celestial characters ===
Munto (ムント)
Voiced by: Mazakazu Higo (OVA), Daisuke Ono (TV), Sean Schemmel (English)
Ruler of the Magical Kingdom and the main protagonist of the series. He deliberately falls to the dangerous Lower World in a desperate bid to contact Yumemi and save his people and the Heavenly World. He is proud and stubborn to a fault, but also strong, courageous, and caring. In the second OVA, like Yumemi who sees his past, he sees hers in exchange, though unwillingly and subconsciously. It is implied that he has feelings for Yumemi as he tells her that she is the only one he wants to protect. This is because he grows closer to her, and every time he is thinking about or with her. This sense causes him to be even more hesitant to reach out for her help, and afraid that if he does, she would disappear in an instant. This theory terrified him enough to hesitate to contact her. It is Munto, this time, who is hesitating and unwilling to ask for help, but is eventually convinced that he must trust her, and his feelings begin to grow even more for her. This is shown to the extent in an extra at the end, as he comes back to see Yumemi, instead of staying behind to help out with his world, as Lady Ryueri states that he is making some preparations of his own. What these preparations are though, are unclear.
Ryuely (リュエリ, Ryueri)
Voiced by: Norie Sawai (OVA), Ryōko Tanaka (TV), Erica Schroeder (English)
A prophetess under Munto's supervision who has the gift of foresight. She sacrifices her own vision to help Munto find the way to restore Akuto and monitors his journey from the Heavens. Calm and collected, she is a motherly figure, especially to the young Toche. She has great faith and respect for Munto, and willingly gave up her eyesight for him, showing no regrets for doing so, although she regained it by the end of the first OVA.
Gass (ガス, Gasu)
Voiced by: Yoshinori Shima (OVA), Tetsu Inada (TV), Dan Green (English)
The enigmatic Guardian of Time, Gass is described as an "Outsider", which may explain his and Irita's Arabic-themed clothing. Despite the dangers of overstepping his role, he allows Munto to slip through a hole in time to find Yumemi. In the second OVA, because Gass allowed Munto to pass through time, his body slowly begins to rot away. This is because he neglected the role as a Guardian of Time during the first crisis, but he is shown to accept this and continues to battle against the opposing forces against the Magical Kingdom. He seems to have given his powers to Munto when he punched him in the stomach, sending him hurtling down to Earth in the second OVA, because he left a mark similar to the ones that appear when he conjures his powers. Gass is a strong-willed person but can be compassionate, as seen with Irita.
Irita (イリタ)
Voiced by: Ayano Sasaki (OVA), Maki Tsuchiya (TV), Lisa Ortiz (English)
A small, imp-like girl who is constantly seen with Gass. She is shown to care for him deeply and treats him with the utmost respect and trust, crying out in fear when he is hurt. Gass also seems to care for Irita, diving into space to catch her when she is falling. Her personality is mischievous and spunky.
Gntarl (グンタール, Guntāru)
Voiced by: Kōchi Kawashima (OVA), Norio Wakamoto (TV), Marc Thompson (English)
"Gntarl" is a corruption of the German name "Gunther," and the name is subbed as "Gunther" in the Munto OVA. He answers to the Elders of the Heavens, and is in command of the united armies. He is a cunning and dangerous person who hungers for power. He is the one who directs the attacks against Munto's Magical Kingdom in an attempt to seize control. It was shown in the second OVA that he had been keeping close watch over Yumemi in the Lower World, and that he too seeks her power.
Toche (トーチェ, Tōche)
Voiced by: Mami Hamada (OVA), Megumi Matsumoto (TV), Jessica Calvello (OVA 1), Veronica Taylor (OVA 2) (English)
A young boy seen consistently with Ryuely, seeing her as a motherly figure. Has a great respect for Munto.
Seven Heads
The leaders of each Heavenly country. They unite an army with Gntarl against the Magical Kingdom.
Leica (ライカ, Raika)
Voiced by: Sonoko Kawata (OVA), Fūko Saitō (TV), Carol Jacobanis (English)
A general of one of the Heavenly World's countries. She makes her appearance in both the first and second OVAs; she is shown to be battling fiercely against Gass while Munto is at Earth in the first OVA, but in the second one she seems to have developed respect for Gass and battles with him instead. A strong warrior and determined at what she does, Leica is also shown to be a fair leader in battle, her subordinates respecting her orders and carrying them out.

== Production ==
Munto is a Japanese original video animation (OVA) series containing two episodes that were released on March 18, 2003, and April 23, 2005. The episodes were directed by Yoshiji Kigami and were produced by Kyoto Animation. While the first episode is entitled simply Munto, the second episode is titled Munto 2: Beyond the Walls of Time (MUNTO 時の壁をこえて, MUNTO Toki no Kabe o Koete). The OVAs were licensed by Central Park Media in North America and are distributed by U.S. Manga Corps.

An animated television series remake and sequel to the OVAs entitled Sora o Miageru Shōjo no Hitomi ni Utsuru Sekai, again directed by Kigami and produced by Kyoto Animation, began airing in Japan on January 14, 2009, on Chiba TV. The episodes started airing at later dates on AT-X, KBS Kyoto, Mie TV, Sun TV, Tokyo MX, TV Kanagawa, TV Saitama, and TV Wakayama. The music for the TV series is composed by Satoru Kōsaki, who previously worked on the second OVA under the Shinji Ikeda alias while employed at Namco. The TV series' opening theme, entitled "Anemoi" (アネモイ), is performed by Eufonius and its ending theme, entitled "Hikari to Yami to Toki no Hate" (光と闇と時の果て; lit. 'The Edge of Light and Darkness and Time'), is performed by Ceui. The CD single for "Anemoi" was released on February 4, 2009, and the CD single for "Hikari to Yami to Toki no Hate" was released on February 25, 2009.

An animated film entitled Tenjōbito to Akutobito Saigo no Tatakai (天上人とアクト人最後の戦い) was released on April 18, 2009. The film's theme song is called "Yumemita Sora" (ユメミタソラ; lit. 'The Sky I Dreamed of'), sung by Mai Aizawa, the voice actress of Yumemi. The CD single for the theme song was released on May 27, 2009. The film, like the OVAs and TV series before it, is also directed by Yoshiji Kigami and produced by Kyoto Animation.
