= Dino Girl Gauko =

- Genre: Comedy
- Created by: Akira Shigino
- Written by: Hikaru Kurozumi
- Directed by: Akira Shigino
- Voices of: Naoko Matsui (Japanese); Corina Boettger (English)
- Composer: Kazuhiko Sawaguchi
- Countries of origin: United States; Japan; Singapore; Philippines
- Original languages: English; Japanese
- No. of seasons: 2
- No. of episodes: 39

Production
- Executive producers: Hitoshi Mogi; Bernard Chong; Jackeline Chua; Jyotirmoy Saha
- Producer: Hitoshi Mogi
- Editor: Satoko Fujimoto
- Running time: 9 minutes
- Production companies: Ascension; August Media; Synergy 88

Original release
- Network: Netflix
- Release: November 22, 2019 – March 20, 2020

Dino Girl Gauko (Japanese: 恐竜少女ガウ子, Hepburn: Kyōryū Shōjo Gauko) is an animated television series created by Akira Shigino for Netflix. The show revolves around the teenage girl Naoko, who transforms into a dinosaur when she gets angry.

The series premiered on November 22, 2019 on Netflix. Its second season was made available on March 20, 2020.

== Plot ==
An 11-year-old girl named Naoko Watanabe has the ability to transform into a fire breathing Dinosaur named gauko whenever she gets angry or when her anger exceed a massive level.

== Voice cast ==
Character	Japanese voice actor	English voice actor
Naoko Watanabe / Gauko	Naoko Matsui	Corina Boettger
Mom	Chie Kōjiro	Julie Ann Taylor
Dad	Chafurin	Christopher Swindle
Halley Tomoyo	Tomoyo Chujo	Laura Post
Keisuke Saito	Kazue Ikura	Ben Diskin
Kinpika	Mari Mashiba	Alex Cazares
Babu Lisa	Risa Nakamura	Cassandra Lee Morris
Kana	Yui Toita	Tara Sands
Erika	Karen	Erika Harlacher
Mr. R3	Takuro Hijioka	Keith Silverstein
Toshio Hiraga	Sônosuke Hattori	Johnny Yong Bosch
Takashi Yamada	Ryoko Shiraishi	Bryce Papenbrook
Mutchan	Mutsuki Arisawa	Stephanie Sheh
Bibilian	Hiroshi Kamiya	Ben Diskin

== Episodes ==
Season	Episodes	Originally released
1	20	November 22, 2019
2	19	March 20, 2020

=== Season 1 (2019) ===
No. overall	No. in season	Title	Original release date
1	1	"Nice to Meet You. I'm Gauko"	November 22, 2019
2	2	"Fateful Encounter"	November 22, 2019
3	3	"Photo Day"	November 22, 2019
4	4	"Stuck as Gauko"	November 22, 2019
5	5	"Takashi is a Nuisance"	November 22, 2019
6	6	"Don't Get Angry"	November 22, 2019
7	7	"Gauko's Long Day"	November 22, 2019
8	8	"Dad's Secret"	November 22, 2019
9	9	"Fortune Telling"	November 22, 2019
10	10	"Dinosaur Police"	November 22, 2019
11	11	"Mole Life"	November 22, 2019
12	12	"Broken Teacher"	November 22, 2019
13	13	"Gau-Croquette"	November 22, 2019
14	14	"Mystery Monster"	November 22, 2019
15	15	"Mutchan"	November 22, 2019
16	16	"Picnic"	November 22, 2019
17	17	"Mecha Gauko"	November 22, 2019
18	18	"Get the Poem Book Back!"	November 22, 2019
19	19	"Final Weapon Robo"	November 22, 2019
20	20	"Goodbye Alien"	November 22, 2019

=== Season 2 (2020) ===
No. overall	No. in season	Title	Original release date
21	1	"Imposter Gauko"	March 20, 2020
22	2	"Mom's Birthday"	March 20, 2020
23	3	"Alien Chase"	March 20, 2020
24	4	"Community Center"	March 20, 2020
25	5	"Running Away"	March 20, 2020
26	6	"KinPika's Troubles"	March 20, 2020
27	7	"Copy Machine"	March 20, 2020
28	8	"Never Give Up"	March 20, 2020
29	9	"Teacher R3 Explodes"	March 20, 2020
30	10	"Masked Singer"	March 20, 2020
31	11	"Candy Strategy"	March 20, 2020
32	12	"My Cousin and the Snake"	March 20, 2020
33	13	"My Cousin and the Snake Return"	March 20, 2020
34	14	"World Domination Kit"	March 20, 2020
35	15	"Big Sister"	March 20, 2020
36	16	"Ultimate Paella"	March 20, 2020
37	17	"Alien President"	March 20, 2020
38	18	"Get Angry Gauko"	March 20, 2020
39	19	"Samba Competition"	March 20, 2020

== Release ==
Dino Girl Gauko was released on November 22, 2019 on Netflix.
