= Trump Guy =

- Family Guy episode
- Episode no.: Season 17; Episode 11
- Directed by: Joe Vaux
- Written by: Patrick Meighan
- Editing by: Mike Elias
- Production code: HACX09
- Original air date: January 13, 2019
- Running time: 22 minutes

Guest appearances
- Dee Bradley Baker as Mike Pence; Damien Fahey; Ross Marquand; Ali Raizin as Tiffany Trump; Josh Robert Thompson as Justin Trudeau and Donald Trump; Mae Whitman as Ivanka Trump

Episode chronology
← Previous "Hefty Shades of Gray"	Next → "Bri, Robot"
- Family Guy season 17

"Trump Guy" is the eleventh episode of the seventeenth season of the animated sitcom Family Guy, and the 320th episode overall. It aired on Fox in the United States on January 13, 2019, and is written by Patrick Meighan and directed by Joe Vaux. Family Guy follows an American nuclear family led by oafish Peter Griffin in the fictional New England town of Quahog. Continuing from "Hefty Shades of Gray," Griffin is invited by Donald Trump to become the White House Press Secretary.

Although the producers of Family Guy have mocked Trump as well as many prominent Republican figures in the past, this was the first episode focused on Trump.

== Plot ==
Peter Griffin and his family move to Washington, D.C. after he's hired to work for the Trump administration from the end of the previous episode, "Hefty Shades of Gray". Meg is less than pleased about the move, but after meeting Ivanka Trump and getting a makeover, she becomes more attractive (according to D.C standards as said by Brian). However, when Ivanka leaves her with Donald Trump he sexually assaults her, with her family refusing to believe her when she tells them. When Trump tries to molest her a second time, the rest of the Griffins catch him in the act, leading Peter to resign from his job and to try to be a kinder man. When he is unsurprisingly unable to keep this vow, Trump rubs it in his face and insults him as a failed role model.

Peter and Trump engage in a protracted fight, after the former questions Trump's actual net worth. After brawling in the White House for several minutes and interrupting a press conference, the two steal separate airplanes from the Smithsonian Institution. The planes hit each other head on and crash, miraculously perched atop the Washington Monument. With Peter's life at stake, Trump becomes sympathetic and attempts to save Peter. Peter tries to grab on, but is unable to due to how small Trump's hands are. Trump lowers himself to try and grab Peter, but his hand slips from the ledge and the two begin a freefall towards the concrete below. However, they land on a cushion, having been saved by Justin Trudeau with an industrial air mattress. The Canadian Prime Minister checks that the duo are okay and then departs. Trump and Peter reconcile their grudges in the sunset and move on. In the ending scene, the Griffins break the fourth wall to encourage Americans to read the Steele dossier.

== Reception ==
The episode received an audience of 4.04 million, the lowest in its timeslot, but the third most watched show on Fox that night after The Simpsons and Bob's Burgers.

The episode received negative reviews from critics. Additionally, it courted some controversy prior to airing for a joke included at the end of "Hefty Shades of Grey" with Trump making sexual advances to his daughter Ivanka Trump, in reference to a 2006 appearance on The View when the then-reality television star said, "If Ivanka weren’t my daughter, perhaps I’d be dating her."
