= I'm from Japan =

Japanese manga series

- First volume cover

ジモトがジャパン (Jimoto ga Japan)
- Genre: Comedy, martial arts
- Manga
- Written by: Seiji Hayashi
- Published by: Shueisha
- English publisher: NA: Viz Media
- Imprint: Jump Comics
- Magazine: Weekly Shōnen Jump; (September 15, 2018 – May 27, 2019); Saikyō Jump; (June 1, 2019 – April 2, 2020)
- English magazine: NA: Weekly Shonen Jump
- Original run: September 15, 2018 – April 2, 2020
- Volumes: 6
- Anime television series
- Directed by: Isamu Ueno
- Written by: Masato Naruse; Kōji Hashimoto
- Studio: ODDJOB
- Original network: TV Tokyo
- Original run: April 8, 2019 – March 23, 2020
- Episodes: 50
- icon

I'm From Japan (Japanese: ジモトがジャパン, Hepburn: Jimoto ga Japan) is a Japanese series written and illustrated by Seiji Hayashi. It was serialized in Shueisha's shōnen manga magazine Weekly Shōnen Jump from September 2018 to May 2019 and in Saikyō Jump from June 2019 to April 2020. Its chapters were collected in six tankōbon volumes. Viz Media published the first three chapters for its "Jump Start" initiative. Shueisha simulpublished the series in English on their app and website platform Manga Plus in January 2019. A 50-episode anime television series adaptation by ODDJOB was broadcast on TV Tokyo from April 2019 to March 2020.

== Characters ==
Japan Hinomoto (日ノ本 ジャパン, Hinomoto Japan)
Voiced by: Minami Takayama
Tokio Abiko (安孫子 時生, Abiko Tokio)
Voiced by: Koutaro Nishiyama
Hide (ヒデ)
Voiced by: Wataru Hatano
Masurao Kikuchi (菊池 益荒男, Kikuchi Masurao)
Voiced by: Tesshō Genda
Komachi Yuze (湯瀬 こまち, Yuze Komachi)
Voiced by: Reina Ueda

== Media ==
=== Manga ===
Written and illustrated by Seiji Hayashi, I'm from Japan was serialized in Shueisha's Weekly Shōnen Jump magazine from September 15, 2018, to May 27, 2019. It was then transferred to Saikyō Jump, where it ran from June 1, 2019, to April 2, 2020. The individual chapters were collected and published by Shueisha into six tankōbon volumes, released from January 4, 2019, to May 13, 2020.

Viz Media published the first three chapters for its "Jump Start" initiative. Shueisha simulpublished the series in English on their app and website Manga Plus.

==== Volume list ====
No.	Release date	ISBN
1	January 4, 2019	978-4-08-881671-5
2	April 4, 2019	978-4-08-881761-3
3	June 4, 2019	978-4-08-881829-0
4	October 4, 2019	978-4-08-882072-9
5	February 4, 2020	978-4-08-882174-0
6	May 13, 2020 (Note: Volume 6 was slated to be released on May 1, 2020 but was delayed to May 13, 2020 due to COVID-19 concerns.)	978-4-08-882285-3

=== Anime ===
An anime television series adaptation was announced via Weekly Shōnen Jump's official Twitter account on December 22, 2018. The series is animated by ODDJOB and directed by Isamu Ueno, with Masato Naruse and Kōji Hashimoto handling series composition, and Hana Nohara and Fumiyuki Uehara designing the characters. The series premiered on TV Tokyo on April 8, 2019, and finished on March 23, 2020. Akira Kushida performed the series' ending theme song "Appare! Jimoto ga Ichiban!!".
