= Naomi Ishida =

Japanese animation color designer (1969–2019)

- 石田 奈央美
- Born: 6 August 1969
- Died: 18 July 2019 (aged 49); Fushimi, Kyoto, Japan
- Cause of death: Arson attack
- Occupation: Colorist
- Years active: 1992–2019
- Employer: Kyoto Animation
- Known for: Kyoto Animation employee

Naomi Ishida (Japanese: 石田 奈央美, Hepburn: Ishida Naomi; 6 August 1969 – 18 July 2019) was a Japanese animation color designer who worked for Kyoto Animation.

== Early life ==
Ishida was born to parents involved in Japan's traditional crafts industry; her father worked as a master cloth dyer for kimono, while her mother was a weaver of Nishijin-ori obi. She took an interest in arts and crafts at an early age, and became a fan of Galaxy Express 999 while in junior high school, drawing fan art from the series. After graduating from Kyoto Prefectural Rakusui High School, she began working at a hospital as a nurse, but quit her job to attend a vocational school to study animation, despite opposition from people around her.

== Career ==
Ishida joined Kyoto Animation at age 22 in 1992, shortly after completing her schooling. Her initial work included color checking and cel painting for series on which Kyoto Animation was a subcontractor, including Inuyasha. As the studio began creating original works, Ishida became central to the studio's color department. Among the studio's early works as the primary animation producer, her credits included Air as a digital paint artist for three episodes, and for Kanon as a color checker and setting creator for two episodes. As the studio produced further works, Ishida's responsibilities grew, eventually leading her to become one of the studio's two main color designers. Productions on which she served as color designer included Hyouka, The Disappearance of Haruhi Suzumiya, Amagi Brilliant Park, A Silent Voice, and Liz and the Blue Bird.

While Ishida regularly worked at Kyoto Animation's Studio 2, she was present at Studio 1 on the day of the Kyoto Animation arson attack which targeted the building, and was killed alongside 35 others. Ishida was the first victim to be identified as deceased by her parents. Ishida had worked at Kyoto Animation for 26 years. She was found dead on second floor of Studio 1, and the police determined that she died at approximately 10:40 a.m. from carbon monoxide poisoning. The police handed Ishida's body over to her parents on 23 July, and the funeral was held on 26 July. At the funeral, Ishida's mother dressed her daughter in a kimono which had been prepared for her marriage, and her friends and colleagues attended the funeral. In the aftermath of the arson attack, Ishida's mother advocated for the creation of a public memorial on the former site of the studio.

== Works ==
Ishida worked on over 50 film and television productions in various capacities. Her works as a color designer include:

- The Melancholy of Haruhi Suzumiya (2006) - Color Designer, Color Settings (episodes 2, 7, 13, 14)
- The Melancholy of Haruhi Suzumiya Second Season (2009) - Color Designer, Color Checker (episodes 1, 5, 6, 8, 9, 12, 17)
- The Disappearance of Haruhi Suzumiya (2010) - Color Designer
- Hyouka (2012) - Color Designer
- Amagi Brilliant Park (2014) - Color Designer
- A Silent Voice (2016) - Color Designer, Color Settings
- Liz and the Blue Bird (2018) - Color Designer, Color Checker
- Tsurune (2018) - Assistant Color Designer (episodes 3, 7, 11, 14)
