= Yoshiji Kigami =

Japanese animator, director, and storyboarder (1957–2019)

- 木上 益治
- Born: 28 December 1957; Osaka Prefecture, Japan
- Died: 18 July 2019 (aged 61); Fushimi, Kyoto, Japan
- Other names: Ichirou Miyoshi, Fumio Tada
- Occupations: Animator, television director and storyboarder
- Years active: 1979–2019
- Known for: Kyoto Animation employee

Yoshiji Kigami (Japanese: 木上 益治, Hepburn: Kigami Yoshiji; 28 December 1957 – 18 July 2019) was a Japanese animator, director and storyboarder. He started working at Shin-Ei Animation, later became part of Animaruya and then he became affiliated with Kyoto Animation.

== Career ==
When he was young, Kigami was a big fan of Disney movies and anime shows based on the manga series of Osamu Tezuka, and this led him to becoming an animator. He started working at Shin-Ei Animation before joining Kyoto Animation. Kigami became well known in the industry for his work on Grave of the Fireflies and Akira as a key animator. In 2003, Kigami directed his first work, Munto, and later became an instructor at Kyoto Animation's teaching program. In Kyoto Animation productions, he used the pen name Ichirou Miyoshi (三好一郎) when storyboarding, and Fumio Tada (多田文男) when doing key animation.

== Death ==
On 18 July 2019, during the Kyoto Animation arson attack, Kigami was killed alongside 35 of his colleagues, with 33 others wounded; Kigami was initially declared missing after the attack due to his mother declaring that he could not be contacted immediately following the fire. His death was confirmed on 2 August 2019.

== Filmography ==
- Grave of the Fireflies: Key Animation
- Cat's Eye: Key Animation (4 episodes)
- Akira: Key Animation
- Doraemon (7 movies): Key Animation
- Robotan: Episode director (ep 5)
- Lucky Star: Animation Director (ep 18)
- Clannad: Animation Director (ep 3); Key Animation (ep 12, ep 23, ep 24)
- Love, Chunibyo & Other Delusions: Episode Director (ep 6); Storyboard ep (ep 6)
- Crayon Shin Chan Movies (1; 3;7;9) : Key Animation
- Hyouka: Key Animation; Storyboard (ep 5); Episode Director (ep 5)
- K-On!: Key Animation (ep 10, ep 12)
- K-On! Movie: Key Animation
- Munto: Director
- Tamako Market: Episode Director (ep 2, ep 9), Storyboard (ep 9), Key Animation (ep 1)
- Violet Evergarden: Episode Director (ep 6), Storyboard (ep 6)
- Nichijou: Episode Director (ep 6, ep 14, ep 20), Storyboard (ep 6, ep 14, ep 20)
- Air: Storyboard (ep 11), Episode Director (ep 11)
- Free!: Key Animation
- Full Metal Panic? Fumoffu: Storyboard (ep 3, ep 7), Episode Director (ep 3, ep 7)
- Full Metal Panic! The Second Raid: Storyboard (ep 4, ep 8, ep 12), Episode Director (ep 4, ep 12)
- Sound! Euphonium: Episode Director (ep 5, ep 12)
- Baja no Studio: Director
- A Silent Voice: Key Animation
