= After School Dice Club =

Japanese manga series

- First tankōbon volume cover, featuring (from left to right) Miki Takekasa, Aya Takayashiki, and Midori Ono

放課後さいころ倶楽部 (Hōkago Saikoro Kurabu)
- Genre: Iyashikei
- Manga
- Written by: Hirō Nakamichi
- Published by: Shogakukan
- Imprint: Shōnen Sunday Comics Special
- Magazine: Monthly Shōnen Sunday
- Original run: March 12, 2013 – June 11, 2021
- Volumes: 19
- Anime television series
- Directed by: Kenichi Imaizumi
- Written by: Atsushi Maekawa
- Music by: Shūji Katayama
- Studio: Liden Films
- Licensed by: Crunchyroll (Note: In North America through Crunchyroll, LLC (formerly known as Funimation).); SA/SEA: Medialink
- Original network: ABC, Tokyo MX, BS11
- English network: US: Crunchyroll Channel
- Original run: October 3, 2019 – December 19, 2019
- Episodes: 12
- icon

After School Dice Club (Japanese: 放課後さいころ倶楽部, Hepburn: Hōkago Saikoro Kurabu) is a Japanese manga series written and illustrated by Hirō Nakamichi. It focuses on a group of teenage girls and their efforts to set up a board game café. It was serialized in Shogakukan's shōnen manga magazine Monthly Shōnen Sunday from March 2013 to June 2021, with its chapters collected in nineteen tankōbon volumes. An anime television series adaptation by Liden Films aired from October to December 2019.

== Plot ==
Miki Takekasa is a shy high school girl who prefers to keep to herself. One day after school, she encounters a new transfer student named Aya Takayashiki, who convinces her to go on an adventure together. Sometime later, they spot the class representative, Midori Ono, heading into the entertainment district. When they follow her, they learn she works at a game shop. This discovery causes Miki, Aya, and Midori to realize that they share a passion for board games. As such, they spend time playing different games together.

== Characters ==
Miki Takekasa (武笠美姫, Takekasa Miki)
Voiced by: Saki Miyashita (Japanese); Alexis Tipton (English)
Miki is a shy girl with short blue hair and turquoise eyes. She does not believe she knows how to have fun and prefers to avoid crowds.
Aya Takayashiki (高屋敷綾, Takayashiki Aya)
Voiced by: Marika Kōno (Japanese); Dani Chambers (English)
Aya is an exuberant new student with long light brown hair and brown eyes. She has a tendency to treat new acquaintances as old friends.
Midori Ono (大野 翠, Ōno Midori)
Voiced by: Miyu Tomita (Japanese); Madeleine Morris (English)
Midori is the class representative who is a stickler for rules. She has shoulder length dark brown hair and brown eyes. She works in a game shop in the entertainment district.
Takeru Kinjō (金城タケル, Kinjō Takeru)
Voiced by: Takaya Kuroda (Japanese); Ray Hurd (English)
Takeru is a man of rough appearance, but amicable nature. He is the manager of the game shop where Midori works. He has tanned skin, always wears sunglasses, and is bald.
Emilia (エミーリア, Emīria)
Voiced by: M.A.O (Japanese); Mikaela Krantz (English)
Emilia is a blonde German/Irish girl who moved from Hamburg to Japan with her father. She transfers to the school where Miki, Aya, and Midori go.
Shōta Tanoue (田上翔太, Tanoue Shōta)
Voiced by: Kōhei Amasaki (Japanese); Jordan Dash Cruz (English)
Shōta is a blond boy with brown eyes who is a classmate of Miki, Aya, and Midori's. Having known Midori since preschool, he has a crush on Aya and desires to get close to her.
Ryūji Yoshioka (吉岡龍二, Yoshioka Ryūji)
Voiced by: Shun Horie (Japanese); Christopher Llewyn Ramirez (English)
Ryūji is a friend of Shōta's who is somewhat socially awkward and devoted to practicing kendo. He has a group of fangirls he actively tries to avoid.
Yūto Aoshima (青島悠人, Aoshima Yūto)
Voiced by: Taku Yashiro (Japanese); Ricco Fajardo (English)
Yūto is the student council president. Easygoing and popular, he is good at identifying individuals' strengths and weaknesses. He states that he ran for student council to make people smile.
Ren Shibusawa (渋沢連, Shibusawa Ren)
Voiced by: Kotori Koiwai (Japanese); Kristi Rothrock (English)
Ren is the student council vice president. She has short pink hair and pink eyes. She and Midori were a team in middle school, and she is determined to get Midori back into the student council.
Hana Takayashiki (高屋敷花, Takayashiki Hana)
Voiced by: Hisako Tōjō (Japanese); Amber Lee Connors (English)
Hana is Aya's mild mannered older sister. She has long brown hair and brown eyes. Her best friend describes her as a magnet for weirdos.
Kyōko Maki (牧京子, Maki Kyōko)
Voiced by: Eriko Matsui (Japanese); Michelle Rojas (English)
Kyōko is Hana's best friend. She has blonde hair always pulled back in a short ponytail, green eyes, and is usually seen chewing on a stick. She has a threatening persona, but has a track record of defending the underdog.

== Media ==
=== Manga ===
Written and illustrated by Hirō Nakamichi, After School Dice Club was serialized in Shogakukan's Monthly Shōnen Sunday magazine from March 12, 2013, to June 11, 2021. Shogakukan collected its chapters in nineteen tankōbon volumes, published from September 12, 2013, to July 12, 2021.

==== Volumes ====
No.	Japanese release date	Japanese ISBN
1	September 12, 2013	978-4-09-124407-9
2	February 12, 2014	978-4-09-124601-1
3	July 11, 2014	978-4-09-124768-1
4	December 12, 2014	978-4-09-125516-7
5	May 12, 2015	978-4-09-126067-3
6	December 11, 2015	978-4-09-126337-7
7	May 12, 2016	978-4-09-127238-6
8	October 12, 2016	978-4-09-127436-6
9	March 10, 2017	978-4-09-127543-1
10	September 12, 2017	978-4-09-127738-1
11	March 17, 2018	978-4-09-128196-8
12	August 9, 2018	978-4-09-128468-6
13	December 12, 2018	978-4-09-128723-6
14	May 10, 2019	978-4-09-129219-3
15	October 11, 2019	978-4-09-129458-6
16	April 10, 2020	978-4-09-850086-4
17	October 12, 2020	978-4-09-850262-2
18	March 12, 2021	978-4-09-850469-5
19	July 12, 2021	978-4-09-850615-6

=== Anime ===
An anime television series adaptation was announced in the October issue of Monthly Shōnen Sunday on September 12, 2018. The series was animated by Liden Films and directed by Kenichi Imaizumi, with Atsushi Maekawa handling series composition, Yukiko Ibe designing the characters, and Shūji Katayama composing the music. It aired from October 3 to December 19, 2019, on ABC, Tokyo MX, and BS11. (Note: ABC listed the series premiere at 26:11 on October 2, 2019, which is effectively October 3 at 2:11 a.m. JST.) The series ran for 12 episodes. Miyu Tomita performed the series' opening theme "Present Moment", while Saki Miyashita, Marika Kōno, and Tomita performed the series' ending theme "On the Board".

==== Episodes ====
No.	Title (Note: All English titles are taken from Funimation.)	Original release date
1	"A New World"; Transliteration: "Shiranai Sekai" (Japanese: 知らない世界)	October 3, 2019
Miki Takekasa is a loner who typically does not enjoy being around her classmates. On her way home from school, she barely misses being hit when Aya Takayashiki loses control of her bike and crashes in the river. After changing her wet clothes, Aya asks Miki to explore the city with her. On the way home from their adventure, they spot their class representative, Midori Ono, heading into the entertainment district. They follow her to a game shop, where she informs them that she works there and has special permission from their school to do so. She then tells them to leave, but the store manager, Takeru Kinjō, asks them to stick around and play a game with him. Midori refuses to join, so Takeru teaches Miki and Aya the game of Marrakech. However, Midori later starts advising Miki on what moves to make. At the end of the game, Aya asks for a rematch. Midori reminds her that she should not be in the entertainment district in the evenings, but that she can come by on the weekends if she likes. Miki wishes to have more days like she just experienced.
2	"This Is a Cockroach!"; Transliteration: "Kore wa Gokiburi desu！" (Japanese: これはゴキブリです！)	October 10, 2019
Miki, Aya, and Midori meet each other at school. Miki later notices that their classmate, Shōta Tanoue, is staring at them. Expressing a desire to get to know Aya, he tries to talk to her all day, but is interrupted every time. Midori catches him lingering outside the classroom after class and tells him to go home, but he lies and says he forgot something. When Aya invites Shōta to play with them, Midori teaches everyone how to play a card game called Kakerlakenpoker. During the game, Miki notices Shōta's behavior around Aya. Aya cannot manage to lie to anyone and loses every turn. Shōta stresses over how to keep her in the game, but accidentally deals the finishing move himself. Meanwhile, Miki proves herself a natural at spotting lies. After the game, Aya confronts Shōta. Thinking she has figured out that he has a crush on her, Aya erroneously believes that he has a crush on Midori and declares that she will help him. Aya tells Midori that next time they play, they should invite Shōta again.
3	"Not Alone"; Transliteration: "Hitori to Chau Kara" (Japanese: ひとりとちゃうから)	October 17, 2019
Miki recalls being bullied as a child. Back in the present, she notices a woman bent over on the sidewalk. Fearing the woman is unwell, she approaches and asks if the woman is all right. It turns out the woman's cat was hiding under the house and Miki coaxes it out. The woman is surprised saying the cat is shy and generally does not like strangers. Miki meets up with her friends and goes to Aya's house. She is surprised to see the same woman from earlier and finds out she is none other than Hana Takayashiki, Aya's older sister. Hana and her best friend, Kyōko Maki, join in for a game. Miki is initially intimated by Kyōko, but soon decides she is all right. Kyōko is later convinced she and Miki have met before. Midori then teaches everyone how to play Incan Gold. At the end of the game, Miki realizes that Kyōko was the one who chased away her bullies. She compares bad memories to be like dark caves, but if you have the courage to delve into them, you can find jewels like Kyōko.
4	"Midori's Dream"; Transliteration: "Midori no Yume" (Japanese: ミドリの夢)	October 24, 2019
Student council vice president Ren Shibusawa is stressed over planning the school festival. The class president broke his leg, leaving Ren in charge until his return. Determined to make the school festival the best, she asks Midori for help, who refuses on account of her job. Midori explains to her friends that she used to be student council president in middle school and that is why Ren was asking her for help. Ren tracks down Midori at work and asks her to quit her job so she has time for student council. Midori explains she is passionate about her job, and that she wants to develop board games some day. Ren scoffs at that dream, but Miki and Aya both stand up for Midori. Ren refuses to quit asking so Midori challenges her to a game of 6 nimmt!. If Ren wins, Midori will rejoin the student council, but if Midori wins, Ren must leave her alone. Ren loses and leaves in a snit. Midori explains how her brother used to have the same job she currently has. He introduced her to board games, and she had wanted to make her own ever since.
5	"A Message for You"; Transliteration: "Kimi ni Tsutaeru Messēji" (Japanese: キミに伝えるメッセージ)	October 31, 2019
It is summer break and Aya complains about the heat, so she decides the girls should go to the beach. Due to Miki's aunt having a seaside inn in Kanazawa, they arrange to go there. In the inn, Aya comments on some strange looking shogi pieces. Midori realizes they are not for shogi, but goita, a local specialty game that she is heard of but has never played. Since it is a four player game, Miki's aunt joins them. She reminds Miki that she played before as a child, but Miki does not remember. The next day, the girls plan on going to the beach, but a rainstorm prevents them. A young boy named Takashi is crying about the rain, so they invite him to play with them. Takashi keeps making mistakes and Miki suddenly remembers making the same mistakes when she was his age. She asks to team up with him and shows him how to play without actually telling him what to do. Miki's aunt notes how much her niece has changed thanks to her friends.
6	"A Fledgling Designer Is Born!"; Transliteration: "Hiyokko Dezainā Tanjō ！" (Japanese: ひよっこデザイナー誕生！)	November 7, 2019
Midori announces the prototype of her own game, One Room, but she insists it is not ready to play. A professional game maker visiting the game shop named George Beresford tells her that a game cannot be made by one person alone, and that her game will never be finished if she does not allow other people to play. She gets mad at him, but asks Aya and Miki to play One Room with her. At the end of the game, both of her friends list of several suggestions they believe would make it better. Midori goes and apologizes to George, saying she now understands why it takes multiple people to make a game. However, she will not give up and she is still going to be a game author.
7	"Opening Up"; Transliteration: "Kokoro, Hiraite" (Japanese: こころ、ひらいて)	November 14, 2019
Kyōko finds Miki sitting by herself and asks her where her friends are. After learning her friends are both busy for the day, she insists Miki spend the day with her. They go to the river and after a brief water fight, they play a game of monjiro where Miki compliments Kyōko, much to Kyōko's chagrin. Back at school, Midori makes an application to the student council for a board game cafe for the school festival. Ren, now determined to make the festival good without Midori's help, declines the proposition. Soon after that, student council president Yūto Aoshima returns and finds Midori's application still out on the desk. He goes to Midori's job and pretends he is just browsing, then accepts an invitation to play a game of The Island with Midori, Miki, and Aya. While Yūto loses the game, he has fun playing it. Midori and Miki reveal they both recognized him all along, while Aya is completely surprised. Yūto overturns Ren's decision and approves their game cafe.
8	"The Fourth Friend"; Transliteration: "Yon-nin-me no Tomodachi" (Japanese: 4人めの友だち)	November 21, 2019
Miki, Aya, and Midori enter the game cafe, Cafe Geschenk. There, they find Emilia sleeping. After they wake her up, she invites them to play any game they like. She and Midori then explain the rules of Keltis to Miki and Aya. Emilia warns them it is her favorite game and she has never lost. Midori ultimately wins the game, which surprises Emilia, but she is pleased by the challenge. When the girls explain their situation, Emilia discovers that she will be transferring to their school. At the festival, Miki, Aya, and Midori are discouraged because their game cafe has been assigned to a room that is hard to find. When Emilia finally finds them, she tells them that she has a secret weapon. Elsewhere, Shōta receives a notification showing directions to the cafe. Along the way, he runs into Ryūji Yoshioka. Once they get there, they are greeted by Aya, who asks Shōta to teach Kakerlakenpoker to a group of boys. Meanwhile, Miki explains Dobble to Ryūji and a group of others. Ryūji starts to have fun despite his initial skepticism. Miki muses that the festival was a lot of work, but it was worth it.
9	"Daruma-Doll Fell Down"; Transliteration: "Daruma-san ga Koronda" (Japanese: ダルマサンガコロンダ)	November 28, 2019
The girls take time off of board games to study for the midterm exams. Afterwards, they take Emilia to the game shop where Midori works. At the shop, they play Elfenland. Emilia wins and her friends tease her that her terrible sense of direction does not apply to games. She remembers her friends back in Germany telling her the same thing and cries. She tells them about a promise she made with her best friend where they were going to design a game together. She says she hopes they can still both fulfill that dream separately. Upset to hear that Emilia has the same dream as her, Midori storms out. Emilia expresses her disappointment to Miki and Aya as she overheard Midori talking about her dream. At home, Midori worries that she could never make a game as good as Emilia could. The next day, Emilia asks her friends to teach her a Japanese children's game. They pick Daruma Doll Fell Down. Emilia notices there is no point system and develops one, saying all games are permanent works in progress. Midori is inspired and says she would like Emilia to play her game sometime.
10	"Happy Holy Night"; Transliteration: "Happī Hōrī Naito" (Japanese: ハッピーホーリーナイト)	December 5, 2019
Aya's father comes home after years abroad as a wildlife photographer. Aya is excited to introduce him to her friends and invites them all to a Christmas party. Elsewhere, Shōta is invited as well, but he is so nervous he asks Ryūji to come with him. When her father tells her about his new job offer, Aya becomes furious. Later at the shop, Takeru makes them sit down and play a game of Blokus with Miki and Midori where the two resolve their conflict. At the party, Emilia brings out a game called Ladies & Gentlemen. Midori plays as a boy and pairs with Emilia, Shōta pairs with Aya, and Ryūji pairs with Miki. Over the course of the game, Shōta is unable to keep up with Aya's spending. Meanwhile, Ryūji is amazed how easy it is to please Miki. After the party, Shōta gives Aya a present, which she gratefully accepts. Ryūji tries to work up the courage to tell Miki he wants to see her again, but only manages to wish her a happy New Year. She returns the well wishing and mentions seeing him again in the next year, causing him to blush.
11	"A Game By Everyone"; Transliteration: "Minna no Gēmu" (Japanese: みんなのゲーム)	December 12, 2019
Takeru tells Midori that George has a message for her: his company is holding a game design contest and he suggests she enter. Midori playtests One Room with all her friends and her boss, but Takeru thinks it is still missing something. Midori withdrawals herself from her friends to work on her game. Aya and Miki are worried, but Emilia tells them to give Midori space. Midori remembers an employee at her father's furniture store, saying his work was his passion. He could never afford all the furniture he wanted in his personal life, but at work he had access to all sorts of furniture and could arrange it however he wanted. This inspires Midori and she makes cutouts of all the furniture pieces, as well as room cards where players can arrange them as they please. Her friends are amazed by the game, and Midori tells them she could not have done it without them. As the rest of her friends talk about Midori's future, Miki realizes she is a little sad at the idea as she does not want to think about the future because she is happy where they are.
12	"The Place We All Love"; Transliteration: "Watashitachi no Daisuki na Basho" (Japanese: 私たちの大好きな場所)	December 19, 2019
It is the end of the school year and Aya expresses a wish that they all be in the same class the next year. Midori reminds her that cannot happen because they are going into separate majors. They then make plans for spring break, but Emilia tells them she will be going back to Germany during the break. Miki is worried about being separated from her friends. On their day off, she calls each of her friends, none of whom answer. She goes to the game shop looking for Midori and ends up buying a card game she saw called Toddles-Bobbles. Sitting alone on a park bench, she acts out a skit using the cards she bought. Shōta spots her and calls Aya. All of her friends find her and tell her they do not want to be separated from one another. As such, they form the After School Dice Club.

== Reception ==
=== Previews ===
Anime News Network (ANN) had four editors review the first episode of the anime: Theron Martin was unsure of the "cute girls do games" premise following a pre-established formula, but gave it a "tepid recommendation" on the assumption that it will lead to "good character development" and give the board games a more dramatic presentation; Rebecca Silverman felt underwhelmed by the game scenes but said that it could get better in future episodes along with exploring Miki's social anxiety problems; James Beckett was critical of both Miki and Aya's characteristics being overly familiar but was intrigued by the board game of the week template that will build the ensemble's chemistry and individual development, saying "[T]hat might not exactly be a glowing recommendation, but it means the show is just good enough to avoid the seasonal chopping block, at least for the time being." The fourth reviewer, Nick Creamer, found "an engaging relational dynamic" among the three main leads towards the end but found the journey lacking with Miki's "incisive characterization" being centered by a "generally weak script" propping it up, concluding that: "All in all, After School Dice Club certainly isn't breaking any new ground, but it's a reasonable example of its genre centered on a very appropriate gimmick. If you're a slice of life fan, I'd definitely give it a try."

=== Series ===
Fellow ANN editor Caitlin Moore reviewed the complete anime series in 2020. She was initially put off by the generic first episode displaying the typical all-girls hobby show tropes, but was won over by both the main cast's camaraderie and exploration of their lives outside the club, and having thorough understanding of the various games they played each episode, concluding that: "After School Dice Club" offers the best of both worlds in terms of narrative and iyashikei anime. It takes the emphasis on friendship and good times and adds just enough development and structure to keep the tension and interest of people who normally don't care for storyless series."
