= Marrakech (game) =

2007 board game

- Designers: Dominique Ehrhard
- Publishers: (Germany) Zoch Verlag (France) Gigamic (Greece) Kaissa Chess & Games
- Publication: 2007
- Players: 2 to 4 (4 recommended)
- Age range: 6 years up

Marrakech is a board game designed by Dominique Ehrhard in which players are competing carpet traders in the city of Marrakech. It was first published in 2007. Its German edition has been renamed Suleika.

== Gameplay ==
Two to four players can play the game, but four is recommended. The game is played on a grid having of 7 squares per side. Players place "carpets" of the size of two squares, possibly overlapping each other. Each player has a color and plays only carpets of that color from their stack. The players also move a single "trader" piece on the grid using a special six-sided die. When someone moves the trader to an opponent's carpet, they have to pay an amount of game money equal to the size of connected carpet squares of the same colour to the owner of the carpet. The players aim to earn money this way and to have less of their carpets covered by other pieces of carpet.

== Reception ==
The game won the 2008 French As d'Or award and the Austrian Österreichischer Spielepreis award. It also was one of the recipient of the 2009 Mensa Select awards, and it was also nominated for the 2008 German Spiel des Jahres award and the 2009 Japan Boardgame Prize U-more Award.

The reviews were generally mediocre: the reviewers praised the game material, the harmonious design and the simple rules of the game, which would make the game easily accessible to children in particular. On the other hand, however, the game offers too little game depth and tactical options to be able to entertain experienced players in the long term.

== In popular culture ==
Marrakech is the first game played by the heroines of the After School Dice Club manga series (also an anime).

== Sources ==
  - Marrakech at BoardGameGeek
