= More Than a Married Couple, But Not Lovers =

Japanese manga series

- Cover of the first tankōbon volume, featuring Akari Watanabe

夫婦以上、恋人未満。 (Fūfu Ijō, Koibito Miman)
- Genre: Romantic comedy
- Manga
- Written by: Yūki Kanamaru
- Published by: Kadokawa Shoten
- English publisher: NA: Udon Entertainment
- Imprint: Kadokawa Comics A
- Magazine: Young Ace
- Original run: March 2, 2018 – present
- Volumes: 13
- Anime television series
- Directed by: Takao Kato (Note: Credited as Chief Director (総監督, Sō Kantoku).); Junichi Yamamoto
- Written by: Naruhisa Arakawa
- Music by: Yuri Habuka
- Studio: Studio Mother
- Licensed by: Crunchyroll (streaming); SEA: Medialink
- Original network: AT-X, SUN, Tokyo MX, KBS Kyoto, BS11
- Original run: October 9, 2022 – December 25, 2022
- Episodes: 12
- icon

More Than a Married Couple, But Not Lovers (Japanese: 夫婦以上、恋人未満。, Hepburn: Fūfu Ijō, Koibito Miman; abbreviated Fuukoi) is a Japanese manga series by Yūki Kanamaru. It has been serialized in Kadokawa Shoten's seinen manga magazine Young Ace since March 2018, with its chapters collected and published in thirteen tankōbon volumes as of March 2025. An anime television series adaptation by Studio Mother aired from October to December 2022.

== Plot ==
High school student Jirō Yakuin is an introvert who would rather keep to himself and play video games than interact with others. He has unrequited feelings for his childhood friend, Shiori Sakurazaka, but the school has implemented a couples training (夫婦実習, Fūfu jisshū) program, which has the students develop social skills on interacting with a partner as if they were married, and they are judged heavily on how well they work together through monitoring. Despite hoping to be paired with Shiori, Jiro is instead paired with Akari Watanabe, a gyaru who finds Jiro repulsive and who would rather be paired with the popular school idol, Minami Tenjin. Learning that if they attain enough points, their current partners can be switched, both Jiro and Akari agree to put their differences aside and work together.

As the story proceeds, Jiro and Akari find themselves developing deeper feelings for each other as they "pretend" to get along, causing confusion between themselves as they struggle to sort out which feelings are real and which are not. Adding to the chaos is Shiori herself, who is revealed to also be in love with Jiro. Complications reach a near breaking point when during a time alone together, Minami tactfully turns down Akari's confession and helps her realize that she ended up actually falling in love with Jiro. Now with both girls aiming to have Jiro for themselves, Jiro himself struggles to decide which girl he should ultimately pursue.

== Characters ==
=== Main ===
Akari Watanabe (渡辺 星, Watanabe Akari)
Voiced by: Saori Ōnishi (Japanese); Lindsay Sheppard (English)
A gyaru and the main female protagonist of the series, who becomes Jirō's partner during the couples training. While Akari portrays an extroverted and confident nature, deep down she is actually very sweet, shy and kind towards her friends and loved ones. Her goal is to become the partner of Minami in the training, and she will do anything, even act like a well-behaved newlywed with Jirō. However, as the story progresses she loses her crush on Minami and falls in love with Jirō for real. Now, her new goal is to become an actual couple with Jirō but struggles to put her feelings into clarity, as well as dealing with Jiro's own cluelessness and insecurities.
Jirō Yakuin (薬院 次郎, Yakuin Jirō)
Voiced by: Seiichiro Yamashita (Japanese); Ben Balmaceda (English)
The main male protagonist of the series, who was forced to pair up with Akari in the couples training. An awkward introvert who deals with self-esteem issues but very kind and hard working at heart. He is fond of playing video games on his handheld console. His main goal is to pair up with his childhood friend, Shiori, and he will do anything to reach his goal, even act like a well-behaved newlywed with Akari. As the story progresses, despite his feelings for Shiori, he finds himself developing deeper feelings for Akari, making him even more confused and not knowing what to do.
Shiori Sakurazaka (桜坂 詩織, Sakurazaka Shiori)
Voiced by: Saki Miyashita (Japanese); Macy Anne Johnson (English)
Jirō's childhood friend and crush. Shy and kind, Shiori is a beautiful girl who ends up becoming Minami's partner in the couples training. Unbeknownst to Jiro, she also has feelings for him, hoping to earn enough points so that she could end up switching Minami for him. Her best friend is Mei; Shiori does not realize that Mei has an unrequited crush on her.

=== Supporting ===
Minami Tenjin (天神 岬波, Tenjin Minami)
Voiced by: Toshiki Masuda (Japanese); Mike Haimoto (English)
A popular and well liked school idol, Minami is the object of nearly every girl's affections, including Akari, who is hoping to become his partner during the couples training. Through circumstance, he ends up being Shiori's partner in the training. During a holiday trip, he ends up being confessed to by Akari but gently lets her down, revealing that he has unrequited feelings for a woman in his past. The woman, named Nozomi, was his former tutor that ended up marrying his older brother; it's hinted that his views on love are jaded due to accidentally witnessing his brother and Nozomi having sex with one another. Thanks to this conversation, Minami helps Akari realize that she is now in love with Jiro and wishes Akari luck with trying to win Jiro's heart. He works part-time at a cafe.
Sadaharu Kamo (加茂 貞春, Kamo Sadaharu)
Voiced by: Sho Nogami (Japanese); Derick Snow (English)
Jirō's best friend at high school who is the only person that Jirō will open up to despite his introverted nature. Like Jirō, Sadaharu also has lousy luck with women, preferring the women to be "2D" instead of real so they can't end up hurting his feelings. Despite this, Sadaharu is a good person at heart and will go out of his way to help his friend out a bind. Similar to Jirō he also has an interest in video games.
Sachi Takamiya (高宮 サチ, Takamiya Sachi)
Voiced by: Minami Takahashi (Japanese); Corey Pettit (English)
One of Akari's best friends, who is outgoing and assertive but wiser than she lets on. She is usually seen together with Natsumi, as both girls help giving Akari valuable life advice.
Natsumi Ōhashi (大橋 ナツミ, Ōhashi Natsumi)
Voiced by: Azumi Waki (Japanese); Molly Zhang (English)
One of Akari's best friends, who is a bit of an airhead but nice at heart. She is usually seen together with Sachi, as both girls help giving Akari valuable life advice.
Shū Terafune (寺船 周, Terafune Shū)
Voiced by: Shūichi Uchida
A high school boy who is friends with Minami and has a crush on Akari. He hates Jirō for his indecisiveness towards Akari, despite having her as a "wife", and declares that he will fight for Akari's love and take her from Jirō.
Mei Hamano (浜野 めい, Hamano Mei)
Voiced by: Yui Ogura (Japanese); Meg McClain (English)
The best friend of Shiori. Kind and supportive but also tough and fair when needed. She encourages Shiori to fight for Jirō's love, despite him being paired with Akari. Like Shu, she also finds Jirō's indecisiveness to be a detriment, sometimes putting her foot down and urging Jirō to fight for what he wants.

== Media ==
=== Manga ===
More Than a Married Couple, But Not Lovers is written and illustrated by Yūki Kanamaru. The series began serialization in Kadokawa Shoten's Young Ace magazine on March 2, 2018. The series went on an indefinite hiatus in April 2025 in order to prepare for its final part. Kadokawa has collected its chapters into individual tankōbon volumes. The first volume was released on October 26, 2018. As of March 4, 2025, thirteen volumes have been released.

At Anime Expo 2023, Udon Entertainment announced that they licensed the series for English publication. The English releases combines two Japanese volumes into one volume each.

==== Volumes ====
No.	Release date	ISBN
1	October 26, 2018	978-4-04-107484-8
2	March 26, 2019	978-4-04-108019-1
3	September 26, 2019	978-4-04-108590-5
4	April 3, 2020	978-4-04-109101-2
5	November 4, 2020	978-4-04-110704-1
6	June 4, 2021	978-4-04-111364-6
7	December 3, 2021	978-4-04-112113-9
8	May 2, 2022	978-4-04-112483-3
9	October 4, 2022	978-4-04-112962-3
10	May 2, 2023	978-4-04-113390-3; 978-4-04-113389-7 (SE)
11	December 4, 2023	978-4-04-114240-0
12	June 4, 2024	978-4-04-114995-9
13	March 4, 2025	978-4-04-115933-0

==== English volumes ====
No.	North American release date	North American ISBN
1	August 13, 2024	978-1-77-294311-5
2	July 22, 2025	978-1-77-294312-2
3	July 14, 2026	978-1-77-294313-9
4	November 10, 2026	978-1-77-294314-6

=== Anime ===
An anime adaptation was announced on November 22, 2021. It was later confirmed to be a television series produced by Studio Mother and directed by Junichi Yamamoto, with Takao Kato serving as chief director, Naruhisa Arakawa handling the series' scripts, Chizuru Kobayashi designing the characters, and Yuri Habuka composing the music. It aired from October 9 to December 25, 2022, on AT-X and other channels. The opening theme song, "TRUE FOOL LOVE", is performed by Liyuu, while the ending theme song, "Stuck on You", is performed by Nowlu. Crunchyroll streamed the series with original Japanese audio and English subtitles, and have premiered an English dub starting on October 23, 2022. Medialink licensed the series in Southeast Asia.

==== Episodes ====
No.	Title	Directed by	Written by	Storyboarded by	Original release date
1	"Living in the Same Place, but Not Living Together."; Transliteration: "Dōkyo Ijō, Dōsei Miman." (Japanese: 同居以上、同棲未満。)	Junichi Yamamoto	Naruhisa Arakawa	Junichi Yamamoto	October 9, 2022
Third year high school students Akari Watanabe and Jirō Yakuin are randomly paired together for their school's couples training program; a course that monitors and judges them based on how well they work together as mock newlyweds. After learning that the Top 10 (A-Rank) couples who score the highest have the right to switch partners, Akari and Jirō reluctantly decide to put aside their differences so that they can earn enough points to switch to their respective crushes; Minami Tenjin, a popular school idol and Shiori Sakurazaka, Jirō's childhood friend. To make matters more interesting, Minami and Shiori are actually partnered with each other. Despite their best efforts and overcoming their polar opposite personalities, including a kiss on the mouth, the pair's score does not improve. However, the intimate acts causes the two to experience strange emotions about each other which results in them questioning themselves on what they are feeling.
2	"Imagined, but Not Real."; Transliteration: "Mōsō Ijō, Genjitsu Miman." (Japanese: 妄想以上、現実未満。)	Hiroaki Matsushima	Naruhisa Arakawa	Hiroaki Matsushima	October 16, 2022
Akari wakes Jirō to try to earn points by watching scary movies together and wearing matching pyjamas. The power suddenly went out and they are locked out of their respective rooms (electronic lock activated). They fell asleep together on the couch by watching a flameless aromatherapy candle. Later at school, the scores are released and the duo learn that reached B-Rank. However, they are shocked to find out that Shiori and Minami are one of the worst scoring couples. Jirō later catches a cold and Shiori unexpectedly arrives to take care of him. Jirō encourages Shiori to improve in the marriage practical before falling asleep, and Shiori nearly kisses him but stops herself. A flashback reveals that Jirō intended to confess to Shiori in middle school but stopped himself short when Shiori accidentally friend-zoned him. Later that night, Akari returns home and Jirō recovers from his illness. It is revealed that Akari was the one who called Shiori over and Jirō thanks Akari by promising to help her get closer to Minami. Instead of happiness, Akari appears to be saddened and annoyed by Jirō's words.
3	"Broken Up, and Not Rekindled."; Transliteration: "Hakyoku Ijō, Fukuen Miman." (Japanese: 破局以上、復縁未満。)	Hideki Hiroshima	Naoko Marukawa	Takao Kato	October 23, 2022
With Jirō's help, Akari prepares a bento for Minami and plans to deliver it to him personally as a way of getting closer to him. Akari thought that Minami would dislike sweet foods and excluded them from the bento. However, Shiori suddenly pays a visit to give them some leftover apple pies she had made for Minami, verifying that Minami actually enjoys sweet foods. Out of insecurity and the need for self validation, a saddened Akari attempts to seduce Jirō; but he stops her saying she has Minami. Feeling defeated and broken, Akari tells Jirō that they should stop acting like a married couple. Akari's and Jirō's score on the practical drops to E-Rank while Shiori and Minami's score improved to A-Rank. Shiori convinces Jirō to make amends with his practice wife. Jirō then tells Akari that he actually enjoys doing activities with her and that he felt that he needed to protect her, which was why he refused her advances as he didn't want her to regret her actions. He then apologizes to her and asks her to be his wife again. Touched by this, Akari accepts Jirō's apology, calls him by his first name for the first time, and admits that she likes him. With everything going back to normal, Jirō is relieved. Meanwhile, Akari is shocked that she admitted that she liked Jirō.
4	"A Hero, but Not the Main Character."; Transliteration: "Yūsha Ijō, Shujinkō Miman." (Japanese: 勇者以上、主人公未満。)	Natsumi Uchinuma	Daisuke Daitō	Natsumi Uchinuma	October 30, 2022
Akari and Jirō learn that there is a rumor saying that Shiori and Minami are getting romantically closer to each other since they are the only pair in A-Rank that have not switched partners. Akari encounters Minami after gym class and he confirms that he will not be switching as long as Shiori is alright with it. This causes Akari to tear up before Minami notices this, holds her face, and asks her to look him in the eye. Sadaharu spots the two where it appears that they are kissing from his point of view. Shiori also confirms with Jirō that she and Minami are staying together, but hints that if Jirō were to reach A-Rank, then they could potentially become partners. Their conversation is interrupted by Sadaharu, who wanted to inform Jirō on what he saw, but is stopped from doing so with the arrival of Minami and Akari. Akari later calls in sick and decides not to go to school that day. Sadaharu takes this time to tell Jirō that he saw Akari and Minami possibly kissing, but Jirō declares that he is unbothered by it. When he returns home, Jirō tells her that he learned that she and Minami had an intimate moment together. Akari laughs and says that he must have been referring to the time that Minami was cleaning dust from her eyes. Realizing that she has made no progress with Minami, Akari begins to cry and begs Jirō to look away. Unsure of what to do, Jirō embraces her; providing her with comfort while also looking away. Touched by this, Akari continues to cry while be held by her partner. Later that day, Akari asks him if he really thought that she kissed Minami before shockingly revealing that Jirō was the first and only person she had ever kissed.
5	"More Than a Nosebleed, but Less Than a Kiss."; Transliteration: "Hanaji Ijō, Kisu Miman." (Japanese: 鼻血以上、キス未満。)	Takao Kato	Naruhisa Arakawa	Atsushi Ōtsuki	November 6, 2022
Jirō learns that he will be paired with Shiori for class duties and thus giving him an opportunity to get closer to her. Mei Hamano, Shiori's best friend, complicitly give her place to Shiori. Shiori almost musters up the courage to kiss Jirō but she gets cold feet. At night, Akari asks Jirō to call her by her given name but Jirō is reluctant. Akari tells him that it is unfair if she's the only one calling him by his given name and he makes it look like that the love is one-sided. A few days later, the school announces a surprise testing period that will evaluate the academic performances of each couple. Although Akari had originally planned to skip studying to go out with friends, Jirō eventually convinces her to study together. Akari is grateful to Jirō for tutoring her and begins to tease him to admit that he is getting aroused. The two nearly engage in an intimate moment but are interrupted when Jiro's nose began to bleed. Akari says that she tease/flirt to help him relax since he is pushing himself too hard to keep up with Shiori. Jirō explains that he wants Akari to be with Minami as well and that by helping her with academics, he could feel that he is contributing towards the group's efforts. Akari appears saddened by Jirō's words knowing that if they switch partners, they will go back to being just classmates.
6	"A Male Virgin, but No Female Virgin."; Transliteration: "Dōtei Ijō, Shojo Miman." (Japanese: 童貞以上、処女未満。)	Hiroaki Matsushima	Naruhisa Arakawa	Hiroaki Matsushima	November 13, 2022
Akari starts calling Jirō by his surname again. Jirō is concerned that their relationship intimacy has dropped. Sadaharu and Jirō witness a girl being rejected by Mei after a confession. Mei apologizes to her and consoles her, and the girl requested that Mei call her by her given name. At home, an ecstatic Akari reports to Jirō that they have reached A-Rank in the latest report. As she dries Jirō's hair in glee, Jirō recalls the interaction between the girl and Mei, and starts calling Akari by her first name, delighting Akari. Mei expresses her disappointment at Shiori for failing to make any progress with Jirō. A stray soccer ball knocks Shiori out and she is sent to the infirmary. Mei informs Jirō about Shiori and demands that he visits her. Shiori awkwardly asks Jirō for a "practice kiss". As they contemplate on whether or not to proceed, Sachi walks into the infirmary. She notices a pair of boy and girl shoes and sounds of squeaky bed noises before awkwardly walking out. As Shiori and Jirō hid from her, they ended up kissing by accident and Jirō walks out in embarrassment. Meanwhile, Akari has been trying to text Jirō to which he hadn't replied. Sachi joins her and tells her about her about encounter in the infirmary, simultaneously as Jirō replies to her a text about visiting Shiori in the infirmary. Akari becomes depressed, thinking that Jirō had "done it" with Shiori. She comes home late to find Jirō had passed out on the sofa after eating the chocolate that she had gotten earlier had unknowingly contained alcohol. After noticing their mugs on the table, Akari realizes that Jirō had been waiting for her so they could eat the chocolate together. Feeling guilty, Akari strips to her underwear and sleeps next to him, while pleading to the unconscious Jirō to at least wait until they are no longer together before going all the way with Shiori. The next morning, Jirō is shocked to find a half-naked Akari sleeping next to him. Since he is unable to remember anything that happened last night, Akari takes the opportunity to make Jirō believe that the two of them had sex. Jirō is baffled and asks Akari if he was no longer a virgin. The question made Akari realize that Jirō never had sex with Shiori. Akari then drops the act, much to Jirō's annoyance.
7	"Fireworks, but No Embrace."; Transliteration: "Hanabi Ijō, Hōyō Miman." (Japanese: 花火以上、抱擁未満。)	Natsumi Uchinuma	Naruhisa Arakawa	Junichi Yamamoto	November 20, 2022
After seeing Jirō's and Shiori's awkward expressions at school, Sachi and Natsumi asks Akari about her marriage practical with Jirō. Akari expresses her confusion about being a third wheel between Minami, Shiori, and Jirō. Sachi and Natsumi tell her to have confidence in herself and not lose hope, as she still has a chance with whoever it is that she wants to be with. They invite Akari to go the local fireworks festival with some of their friends, including Minami, to encourage her. An excited Akari asks Jirō to help her with the yukata for the festival. They debate which knot to use for her obi belt, but Akari wants to make sure that the knot is suitable to Minami's taste. Akari meets up with Sachi and Natsumi for the festival only to find that Minami was unable to make it because of work. Akari notices Minami and Shiori passing through the festival grounds together. Unbeknownst to Akari, Minami and Shiori are revealed to be heading in two separate ways. Thinking that the two are on a date, a distressed Akari heads home. Jirō is on the balcony preparing to watch the fireworks by himself when Akari calls him, sobbing. He rushes out to look for her only to find her already at their front door. He consoles her as she cries loudly in his arms. They watch the fireworks together from their balcony as Akari asks Jirō to redo her obi to his preferred knot. They share an intimate embrace as each wonders about the future of their relationship.
8	"An Entreaty, but No Reassurance."; Transliteration: "Aigan Ijō, Anshin Miman." (Japanese: 哀願以上、安心未満。)	Natsumi Uchinuma	Naruhisa Arakawa	Natsumi Uchinuma	November 27, 2022
Jirō and Akari's ranking in the marriage practical drops to thirteenth position, which means they are still together for another month. Akari barges in a bathing Jirō, freaking out over a spider. Unable to spot it again, a distressed Akari flirtatiously and surreptitiously asks Jirō to stay with her just in case it shows up again. Even to the point that asking him to accompany her to the toilet. As they discuss if they could have dated if they meet under different situations, the tiny "spider" showed up scaring Akari who groped an embarrassed Jirō. Jirō suggests getting a bug spray for next time, but Akari refuses saying that she prefers to be rescued by her husband. As they lay in bed to sleep, Akari lovingly touches the wall separating her from Jirō. Shiori confides to Minami, as a third person, about her kiss with Jirō. She expressed that she is still scared about confessing her true feelings. However, Minami said that she should have more confidence in herself and tell him anyway, before it is too late and will end up regretting it. Mei confirms the same perception to her in class the next day. Shu Terafuné, Mei's partner in the marriage practical, comes in and informs her that he will not be coming home for dinner. He is getting a job interview at the same café where Minami works and then going out for karaoke and dinner with Minami and his boss, which is Sadaharu's older brother, afterwards. He suggests that Mei and Shiori spends the night together as their respective husbands are out. However, Mei bails out of the arrangement with Shiori at the last minute, disappointing an excited Shiori. Jirō and Sadaharu are also having dinner together. Sadaharu insanely lashes out his jealousy at Jirō and attempts to kiss him in the mouth to "cancel out his luck based lechery". As Jirō attempts to stop him, Shiori went pass their restaurant, seemingly staring at them, as she walks home. Jirō runs out to her in an attempt to explain the situation. Shiori thinks that Jirō is talking about their kiss in the infirmary, and both went red in embarrassment to their misunderstanding. Nonetheless, they awkwardly started to apologise and explain to each other about their kiss as they walk home.
9	"More Than a Childhood Friend, but Not True Love."; Transliteration: "Osananajimi Ijō, Honmei Miman." (Japanese: 幼なじみ以上、本命未満。)	Hideki Hiroshima	Naoko Marukawa	Takao Kato	December 4, 2022
Sadaharu invites Jirō to a live-in summer job with his older brother, who is opening a café at the beach. Although reluctant at first, Jirō changes his mind when Shiori said that she and Mei have also applied for the same job. He went home to be greeted by Akari who is showing off her new bikini she just bought for a part-time job she got at the beach. Jirō felt uncomfortable saying that it exposes too much skin. Akari teases him for acting like her real boyfriend before telling him that she will wear a different swimsuit. Overcoming his manly desires and Akari's flirting, he told her about his summer job only to find that she, Natsumi and Sachi have also applied for the same job. They are greeted by Sadaharu's brother and his staff, Minami and Terafuné. Minami showed them their lodgings and they begin their training. Jirō, not being confident in meeting customers, elected to be in the kitchen. This prompts Shiori to also nominate herself to kitchen duties, along with Mei and Sadaharu. Meanwhile, Akari, Sachi, and Natsumi are being trained by Minami and Terafuné in customer service. Akari is ecstatic to be working with Minami, while Sachi and Natsumi teases the jealous Terafuné who has a crush on Akari. As they work, Mei attempts to get Shiori to get closer to Jirō by dragging out Sadaharu to help her with some boxes outside. As they practice making drinks, Jirō accidentally sprays whipped cream on Shiori's face. They unintentionally started flirtatiously touching each other as they clean Shiori's face before Natsumi and Sachi peeks in, embarrassing them both. Jirō and Shiori ponder whether or not they will become more than just childhood friends. After training, the gang spends time at the beach, with Sadaharu making openly lecherous comments about the girls' swimsuits and Shiori obliviously suggesting that she, Mei, Sadaharu, and Jirō go to a nearby hotel together.
10	"'Already' Has Passed, but Not 'Yet.'"; Transliteration: "Ōruredi Ijō, Yetto Miman." (Japanese: already以上、yet未満。)	Hideki Hiroshima	Daisuke Daitō	Atsushi Ōtsuki	December 11, 2022
Mei, Shiori, Sadaharu, and Jirō makes a sandcastle in front of the beach near the hotel that Shiori was pointing to, much to the disappointment of Jirō. While Sadaharu takes the opportunity to exercise his lechery, Shiori unconsciously teases Jirō by touching his hand as they make a tunnel underneath the sandcastle. Jirō and Akari were then tasked to get lunch at the nearby store. Two men were hitting on Akari and Jirō was at a loss in how to help her. However, he mustered enough courage to tell them that they are "married". As they leave, Jirō awkwardly apologises to Akari. A disgruntled Akari then berates him for ruining the chivalrous moment. During bath, Akari, Sachi, Natsumi, Mei, and Shiori had a discussion about how they wish their respective spouses should show more kindness. Shiori felt out of place at first until Akari consoles her, as they both started thinking about Jirō. Akari then met Jirō as she got out of the bathhouse and offers to rub him with cream for his sunburn. Jirō started feeling uncomfortable and tells Akari that the others might get the wrong idea if they seem too close, annoying her. As she walks away disgruntled, she texts Jirō to meet her at the beach shack in ten minutes. Jirō apologises to Akari as they meet, but she berates him for apologising without reason. Akari expresses her frustration about how Jirō is cold to her, try to put himself down as a mediocre guy, and making her feel bad while actually she is excited and happy to be with him. As they talk, they can hear Shiori and Mei walking towards the shack and they hide. They start fighting whilst hidden and make some thudding noises, scaring Shiori and Mei away. Jirō then collapses on Akari from a mild heatstroke. As Jirō came around, they reconcile and Akari tells him that they should make more effort in getting to know each other.
11	"More Than a Confession, but Not Yet a Broken Heart."; Transliteration: "Kokuhaku Ijō, Shitsuren Miman." (Japanese: 告白以上、失恋未満。)	Hiroaki Matsushima	Naruhisa Arakawa	Junichi Yamamoto	December 18, 2022
While Jirō and Shiori had trouble sleeping after their respective night encounters, their coy morning encounters eventually cheered them. During work, Shiori tells Jirō about her "scary" encounter at the beach shack and feels nonplussed on how she will be at the test of courage event later that night. She unwittingly mentions to Jirō that she will be okay if they are paired together, resulting in an awkward moment as she walks out to take out the trash. An eavesdropping Sadaharu then mischievously tells Jirō that he will help them get paired. Considerately, Jirō then asks Sadaharu to help Akari pair up with Minami. With Mei's help, the plan works and the respective pairings are realised. Jirō and Shiori feel awkward while Akari is ecstatic. However, as the event goes on, Akari feels a bit confused about her feelings for Minami. She was about to check on the others using phone chat but then found out she has lost her phone. The other pairs finish their event first, as Jirō and Shiori fail to make any progress due to Shiori's constant panicking during the event. However, they start becoming concerned as Akari and Minami have still not come back. Minami then calls and said that while they're looking for Akari's phone, they got separated. It started to rain and Jirō is bewildered with worry, despite everyone's assurance otherwise. He decides to look for Akari in the rain. Meanwhile, Akari is in squatting alone in despair. Suddenly, she blurted Jirō's name in reflex as Minami found her. Meanwhile, Jirō found Akari's phone as Shiori came running to him with umbrellas. Akari embarrassingly tried to explain to a teasing Minami about her feelings for him and Jirō. Minami tells her that he knew for a while that Akari has a crush on him. However, he politely rejects her saying he is in love with someone else. Akari thought that it was Shiori. However, Minami corrects her and says that it is a girl he knew from his past. While feeling a bit sad that Akari has moved on to Jirō, Akari assures him that her love for him was real and Minami wishes that it will work out between them. Meanwhile, Shiori similarly straightens the confusion about her and Minami to Jirō. The topic of their kiss comes up again and they confide about how confused and bewildered their feelings are, especially since the marriage practical started. Shiori sadly tells him about how lonely she feels and fears that being childhood friends won't keep them together anymore, especially now with Akari in the picture. As they embrace in the rain, they consensually share a deep kiss.
12	"Done, Being Less Than Love."; Transliteration: "Ijō, Ren'ai Miman." (Japanese: 以上、恋愛未満。)	Masato Takeuchi	Naruhisa Arakawa	Junichi Yamamoto	December 25, 2022
Akari, Shiori, and Jirō continue to be confused about their feelings for each other. Akari decides to go the shrine and prays for divine intervention, while Shiori and Jirō are privately bewildered about their latest kiss. Jirō decides to go shopping for some snacks and manga to clear his mind, but encounters Shiori in the shop. Shiori then invites Jirō to her place and both awkwardly agree. They continue to be confused and bewildered as they chat about their recent trip/job at the beach and take a photo together when a rainbow appears. Jirō went back to his family home and started playing games when Akari texts him, telling him that she's bored and wants to ask him out on a date in two hours. Although hesitant, Jirō agrees. Jirō continues to be awkward and confused as they meet up and go for their date, which slightly annoys Akari. They went to a coffee shop, a cat café, shopping, and the arcade. They discuss about exchanging photos and Jirō notices a photo that they took at the cat cafe resembles a couple with a baby(cat), embarrassing him. However, Akari was not flustered, leading Jirō to think that she really is having a good time with him. As they are about to go their separate ways, Akari says that she forgot to buy a charm and rushes to a nearby shrine with Jirō chasing behind. They coincidentally encounter Shiori coming back from shopping and asks if she could join Akari to go to the shrine together. They race to the shrine, encountering various couples and families along the way; including a loving elderly couple whose husband is also named Jirō. As Jirō catches up to them, they each pay their respects and Jirō realises the shrine is famous for fulfilling romantic wishes. As the episode ends, Jirō and Akari are later shown to continue their marriage together and being ranked fourth in the latest report while Shiori and Minami are ranked third.
