= Harukana Receive =

Japanese sports manga series and its adaptations

- Cover of the first manga volume featuring Haruka Ozora

はるかなレシーブ (Harukana Reshību)
- Genre: Sports (Beach volleyball)
- Manga
- Written by: Nyoijizai
- Published by: Houbunsha
- English publisher: NA: Seven Seas Entertainment
- Magazine: Manga Time Kirara Forward
- Original run: August 24, 2015 – September 24, 2020
- Volumes: 10
- Anime television series
- Directed by: Toshiyuki Kubooka
- Produced by: Shintarō Yoshitake; Hiroyuki Kobayashi; Hidehisa Nagasawa; Noritomo Isogai; Mitsuhiro Ogata
- Written by: Touko Machida
- Music by: Rasmus Faber
- Studio: C2C
- Licensed by: Crunchyroll
- Original network: AT-X, Tokyo MX, TVA, Sun TV, RBC, KBS, TVQ, BS11
- English network: US: Crunchyroll Channel
- Original run: July 6, 2018 – September 21, 2018
- Episodes: 12
- icon

Harukana Receive (はるかなレシーブ, Harukana Reshību) is a Japanese manga series written and illustrated by Nyoijizai. It was serialized in Houbunsha's Manga Time Kirara Forward issues from October 2015 to November 2020. The manga has been licensed by Seven Seas Entertainment in North America, with the first two volumes released in July and October 2018, respectively. An anime television series adaptation by C2C aired from July to September 2018.

== Plot ==
In Okinawa, attractive high school city girl Haruka Ozora has an extreme complex about her tall height, while her cousin Kanata Higa (an Okinawan native) is very self-conscious about her short height and flat chest. She also begins to have second thoughts about quitting volleyball all together. However, with help from their experiences, the two girls decide to form a volleyball club at their school.

== Characters ==
=== Uruma High Beach Volleyball Club ===
Originally, the club consisted of the Thomas Twins, Emily and Claire; only being recognized as an extension of Uruma High School's Indoor Volleyball Club; much to Claire's annoyance due to her sister's by-the-book demeanor; meaning the club could not be its own official club until the club gets a minimum of five members. After witnessing Haruka and Kanata's rematch with Narumi and Ayasa, they are inspired to recruit them to the club; with Haruka being excited to join, while Kanata being apprehensive about accepting. After a local Junior tournament, Akari is inspired to join the club and after being challenged by Kanata, the sport inspires her to join the club, thus being the fifth member to make the club official. Despite not having a partner, Akari's demeanor inspires Kanata to nominate her as the club's Manager. After a talk with Claire, Claire and Emily's mother, Marissa, joins the club as the team's coach during her offseason. Unofficially, Haruka and Kanata's grandmother acts as the team's mascot.

=== Team Harukana ===
The pairing of maternal cousins, Haruka Ozora and Kanata Higa. Kanata was originally partnered with Narumi and hoped to become National Champions as a team. But, due to her parents' death and her short height complex, their team disbanded with Narumi reteaming with Ayasa Tachibana, and Kanata leaving the sport. As for Haruka, she is still technically a rookie to the sport, but has a natural talent for picking up the game.

Haruka Ozora (大空 遥, Ōzora Haruka)
Voiced by: Kana Yūki (Japanese); Tia Ballard (English)
Kanata's first cousin through her mother's side. She comes to Okinawa because of her parents' employment, and although initially Kanata is distant from her, they quickly become friends thanks to beach volleyball. Haruka is a rather light-headed and open person, so she often emotionally reacts to people and events around her. She also tends to admire Kanata and from time to time give her ambiguous compliments, but this trait was removed in the anime.
Kanata Higa (比嘉 かなた, Higa Kanata)
Voiced by: Saki Miyashita (Japanese); Sarah Wiedenheft (English)
Kanata is Haruka's first cousin, through her mother, and partner in beach volleyball. She got into beach volleyball through her mother's motivation and wanting to befriend Narumi. Although she is already an experienced volleyball player, several years ago she was forced to leave this sport because of her parents' death and psychological trauma. Kanata is a rather shy, quiet and reserved girl, but in unusual situations she can behave eccentrically. Like Narumi, she is in a long depression because of the breakdown of their volleyball pair, which is why Ayasa and later Haruka compare them to the ex-girlfriends. Nevertheless, in the future, she regains confidence in her abilities thanks to her ever-strengthening bond with Haruka. She is a believer in "No Such Thing as Aces", as she believes that it takes a team to win rather than playing alone; a belief that was passed to her former partner, Narumi.

=== Team Eclair ===
The pairing of the Thomas Twins, Claire and Emily; who are daughters of Marissa Thomas, an American former pro player and current coach. Their team name is a play on éclair. They are ranked as the second best pairing behind Narumi and Ayasa. Originally, when Kanata and Narumi were a team, the pair was defeated by them, with Claire declaring them their rivals (and friends); eventually, their mother became Narumi and Kanata's coach, with the Thomas Family becoming close with Kanata's family. However, when Kanata's parents died, they noted Kanata's broken spirit as the twins noticed this was not the fiery Kanata that defeated them prior. Marissa offers herself as Kanata's parental figure upon learning Kanata's return to the sport.

Claire Thomas (トーマス・紅愛, Tomasu Kurea)
Voiced by: Atsumi Tanezaki (Japanese); Amber Lee Connors (English)
An American exchange student at Uruma High School who, along with her twin sister Emily, is one of the top junior beach volleyball players in the world. Claire combines the personality traits of Haruka and Ayasa, demonstrates the carelessness and cheerfulness of the first, and the playful teasing of the second. She quickly becomes close with Haruka because of the similarity of their personalities and they can often be seen together if Kanata is not around.
Emily Thomas (トーマス・恵美理, Tomasu Emiri)
Voiced by: Rie Suegara (Japanese); Bryn Apprill (English)
Claire's younger twin-sister and beach volleyball partner. She is also the club's leader and part of the Student Body Council. Although they often argue with each other and Emily regularly berates her childish antics, they still remain a good pair and Emily refuses to play with anyone other than Claire.

=== Fukuchiyama Academy ===
Located in the Kyoto Area, the school is known for having a strong volleyball program for both indoor and beach style. The most notable members of that group is the academy's "Valkyries", Narumi Tōi and Ayasa Tachibana.

Narumi Tōi (遠井 成美, Tōi Narumi)
Voiced by: Miyuri Shimabukuro (Japanese); Felecia Angelle (English)
Phlegmatic and serious, she is Kanata's former partner on volleyball. Although earlier they became friends and shared a strong bond thanks to beach volleyball, at the moment they are in a rather strained relationship and do not play together anymore; still feeling guilty about not being there for Kanata when she needed her the most. She adopts the "No Such Thing As Aces" philosophy from Kanata. At the same time, she continues to worry about Kanata and is sincerely pleased when she finds Haruka as a new partner; keeping in contact with Emily and Akari to report their status. Together with Ayasa, Narumi is a multiple champion of local competitions in beach volleyball and even got along with her the title of "idols" of this sport.
Ayasa Tachibana (立花 彩紗, Tachibana Ayasa)
Voiced by: Kanae Itō (Japanese); Dani Chambers (English)
Narumi's best friend and partner. She is the first person with whom Haruka befriended in Okinawa besides her cousin. Although Ayasa is quite a friendly person, she is strongly emotionally attached to Narumi and even compares to her jealous girlfriend when she uses a romantic metaphor for their partnership in volleyball. Originally, she was an indoor volleyball player on a scholarship; but after challenging Narumi, she is inspired to transition from indoor volleyball to beach volleyball, eventually becoming Narumi's partner. Her relationship with Haruka is almost similar to how Claire treats Emily. She also advises Kanata to be too dependent on Haruka.

=== Other members ===
Akari Ōshiro (大城 あかり, Ōshiro Akari)
Voiced by: Chisa Kimura (Japanese); Lindsay Seidel (English)
Nicknamed "Shii-Chan" by Haruka and Claire, much to her embarrassment, Akari is a new girl who originally wanted to play beach volleyball to become popular as an idol after being inspired by Narumi and Ayasa's photo magazine, but eventually decides to become a beach volleyball club manager. Akari is a tsundere, so she is constantly embarrassed and nervous when other girls call her their friend or when Claire remember her participation in the drink's advertising in the past as the Shequasar Girl. Being more of a rookie than Haruka, she still trains with the team in drills. Her strength in Beach Volleyball is her high endurance and stamina despite being a rookie, which she attributes to her stint as an idol. She is the one who gives a hibiscus scrunchy to each of the club members, which symbolizes their friendship despite fellow club members will face off against each other in competition.
Marissa Thomas (トーマス・マリッサ, Tōmasu Marissa)
Voiced by: Umeka Shōji (Japanese); Jamie Marchi (English)
Claire and Emily's mother, and Kanata and Narumi's former coach. She is a former American beach volleyball player and current coach in the Pro Circuit in the states; but during the off season, she decides to become the Club's Coach at Claire's request, Kanata's return to the sport, and a special interest in Haruka. She surprises Haruka, as she is much taller and stronger. Akari comes to admire her due to her perfect body. She also calls Akari, "Shii-Chan", but shows frustration towards Claire for telling her that. She becomes a parental figure towards Kanata even more after finding out she returned to the sport.

=== Other competitors ===
Ai Tanahara (棚原 愛衣, Tanahara Ai)
Voiced by: Akari Kitō (Japanese); Madeleine Morris (English)
Mai Sunagawa (砂川舞, Sunagawa Mai)
Voiced by: Riko Koike (Japanese); Apphia Yu (English)
Youna Aragaki (新垣 陽菜, Aragaki Youna)
Voiced by: Satomi Akesaka (Japanese); Leah Clark (English)
Kanna Aragaki (新垣 柑菜, Aragaki Kanna)
Voiced by: Minami Takahashi (Japanese); Monica Rial (English)

=== Other characters ===
Sora Higa (比嘉ソラ, Higa Sora)
Voiced by: Eiko Yamada (Japanese); Casey Casper (English)
Haruka and Kanata's grandmother. She and her husband adopted Kanata, after her parents' died. She then takes in Haruka when her parents have to leave due to work. She is supportive of both her granddaughters and acts as a mascot of sorts for their club.
Grandpa Higa
Haruka and Kanata's grandfather, and Sora's husband. His face is unseen the entire time. He tends to be absent minded as Sora has to continue to look for him. His hobby is fishing.
Kamekichi (亀吉)
Kanata's pet turtle, who seems to be shy around Haruka as he hides when she tries to pet him. There is an implication that he somewhat might be smarter than Haruka.
Akane Ozora (大空 茜, Ōzora Akane)
Voiced by: Nao Fujita
Haruka's mother and Kanata's aunt.

== Media ==
=== Manga ===
Harukana Receive is a manga series written and illustrated by Nyoijizai. It began serialization in Houbunsha's Manga Time Kirara Forward with the October 2015 issue, and it ended in the November 2020 issue on September 24, 2020. The chapters were collected and released in the tankōbon format by Houbunsha. As of October 12, 2020, ten volumes have been released. Seven Seas Entertainment have licensed the manga for a North American release.

No.	Original release date	Original ISBN	English release date	English ISBN
1	March 12, 2016	978-4-8322-4675-1	July 3, 2018	978-1-626929-05-0
2	October 12, 2016	978-4-8322-4754-3	October 23, 2018	978-1-626929-21-0
3	March 11, 2017	978-4-8322-4814-4	March 12, 2019	978-1-642750-23-2
4	September 12, 2017	978-4-8322-4870-0	July 30, 2019	978-1-642751-17-8
5	April 12, 2018	978-4-8322-4938-7	December 3, 2019	978-1-642756-83-8
6	August 9, 2018	978-4-8322-4970-7	November 24, 2020	978-1-64505-234-0
7	April 11, 2019	978-4-8322-7082-4	April 13, 2021	978-1-64505-775-8
8	August 9, 2019	978-4-8322-7113-5	August 10, 2021	978-1-64827-907-2
9	March 12, 2020	978-4-8322-7175-3	January 25, 2022	978-1-64827-357-5
10	October 12, 2020	978-4-8322-7218-7	April 12, 2022	978-1-63858-224-3

=== Anime ===
An anime television series adaptation by C2C, aired from July 6 to September 21, 2018, on AT-X and other channels. The series was directed by Toshiyuki Kubooka, with series composition by Touko Machida and character designs by Takeshi Oda. The opening theme is "FLY two BLUE" by Haruka Ozora (Kana Yūki) and Kanata Higa (Saki Miyashita), while the ending theme is "Wish me luck!!!" by Ozora (Yūki), Higa (Miyashita), Claire Thomas (Atsumi Tanezaki), and Emily Thomas (Rie Suegara). Crunchyroll simulcast the series with English subtitles, while Funimation streamed an English dub. Following Sony's acquisition of Crunchyroll, the dub was moved to Crunchyroll. The series ran for 12 episodes.

No.	Title (Note: All English titles are taken from Crunchyroll.)	Original release date
1	"We Don't Need Aces"; Transliteration: "Ēisu Nante Hitsuyō Nai no" (Japanese: エースなんて必要ないの)	July 6, 2018
Haruka Ozora travels to Okinawa to live with her cousin, Kanata Higa, and their grandmother. While exploring the beach, Haruka comes across Narumi Tōi and Ayasa Tachibana practising beach volleyball. Taking offense to an offhand comment from Haruka about being a future ace, Narumi, who appears to have a history with Kanata, challenges the two of them to score a single point against her and Ayasa. Although Haruka ends up losing, she learns the meaning behind Narumi's words, as beach volleyball requires full coordination with your partner. As Haruka becomes excited to learn beach volleyball more, she makes plans to have another match with Narumi and Ayasa after some more practice, only learning afterwards that they are both high school champions.
2	"Believe in Me"; Transliteration: "Watashi o Shinjite" (Japanese: 私を信じて)	July 13, 2018
With one week until their rematch with Narumi and Ayasa, Kanata trains Haruka so that she move around more easily in the sand before moving onto ball practice, teaching her how to do a cut shot. On the morning of the match, Haruka comes across Ayasa, who reveals that Kanata was Narumi's former volleyball partner who had a habit of running away from the ball. Feeling happy from overhearing Haruka defend her, Kanata wears her old uniform for the match. After Narumi sees through the girls' cut shot tactic, Haruka encourages Kanata to overcome her fear and receive the ball, catching Narumi off guard and allowing Haruka to win a point. Afterwards, Narumi feels remorse for the way she treated Kanata, while Haruka explains how Narumi's behavior towards Kanata helped her come up with the winning tactic.
3	"I Want to Regain My Former Self"; Transliteration: "Mukashi no Jibun o Torimodoshitaitte Omotteru" (Japanese: 昔の自分を取り戻したいって思ってる)	July 20, 2018
Upon transferring into Uruma High School, Haruka meets Kanata's volleyball friends, Claire and Emily Thomas, and joins them for volleyball practice. As the Thomas sisters get an overwhelming lead, Emily becomes irritated since Kanata would not use a pokey spike. As Kanata remains hesitant on going against her play style by using pokeys to compensate for her short height, Haruka uses one herself, encouraging Kanata to do the same and overcome her block. Afterwards, the girls decide to enter a volleyball tournament, with Kanata becoming determined to regain her former self. Later, Kanata explains to Haruka about how she became friends with Narumi through beach volleyball.
4	"Isn't This Perfect For Us?"; Transliteration: "Watashi-tachi ni Pittari da to Omowanai?" (Japanese: 私達にぴったりだと思わない?)	July 27, 2018
As Haruka wishes she could be more informal with Kanata, Claire, who has been teaching her how to block, notices Haruka's swimsuit is loose and suggests everyone goes to buy new swimsuits. While trying to find some matching swimsuits, Haruka and Kanata meet Ai Tanahara and Mai Sunagawa, who are taking part in the upcoming Junior Tournament. Haruka picks out a pair of swimsuits and customises it with a pattern, unaware of the hidden meaning it carries. The next day, Emily tells Kanata about the promise she made with Narumi when she went to Kyoto before bringing her to Haruka's practice, where the two become even closer.
5	"Until You Break"; Transliteration: "Anta no Kokoro ga Oreru made" (Japanese: アンタの心が折れるまで)	August 3, 2018
The Junior Tournament begins with Haruka and Kanata up against Ai and Mai. As Haruka and Kanata get an early lead thanks to the latter's strategies, Ai and Mai soon fight back with their own strategies, managing to predict Kanata's pokeys.
6	"I Won't Break"; Transliteration: "Orenai yo, Watashi wa" (Japanese: 折れないよ、私は)	August 10, 2018
Kanata's repeated use of pokeys soon prove effective as their wide range cause Ai and Mai to grow more tired, helping her and Haruka to even the score. Perfecting her block, Haruka scores the winning point to take the match, although they wind up losing in the next round. Afterwards, Haruka and Kanata hear about the national Valkyrie Cup from Emily and Claire, and become determined to all make it there together.
7	"We're Already Friends"; Transliteration: "Mō Tomodachi de sho" (Japanese: もう友達でしょ)	August 17, 2018
Akari Ōshiro, who aspires to become a popular idol like Narumi and Ayasa, contemplates joining the beach volleyball club, but gives up when both Emily and Claire refuse to be her partner. While looking to return the bag she forgot, Haruka and Kanata learn that Akari does not have any friends due to her status as a local celebrity. Upon hearing this, Kanata challenges Akari to a one-on-one match, predicting every one of her moves. Despite failing to beat Kanata, Akari enjoys the experience and officially joins the volleyball club while also becoming friends with everyone. The next day, the gang meet Emily and Claire's mother, Marissa.
8	"I'll Keep Our Promise"; Transliteration: "Yakusoku Mamotte Miseru Kara" (Japanese: 約束守ってみせるから)	August 24, 2018
Marissa begins coaching Haruka and Kanata by training them to block and receive her powerful spikes, teaching them to think as a team. Later, at the start of the new year, Narumi and Ayasa have a stopover in Okinawa, prompting Haruka to rush Kanata to the airport, where she reaffirms a promise she made with Narumi to win the nationals.
9	"This Is How I Feel"; Transliteration: "Kore ga Watashi no Kimochi desu" (Japanese: これが私の気持ちです)	August 31, 2018
Akari becomes anxious when she learns that only one team from Okinawa can qualify for the nationals, meaning Haruka and Kanata will have to compete against the Thomas sisters for the spot. After speaking with Narumi and Ayasa, Akari expresses her feelings by making everyone matching scrunchies to represent their friendship even when apart. During the qualifiers, Haruka and Kanata face off against Kanna and Youna Arikawa, managing to beat their topspin attacks and reach the final round, where they face Emily and Claire.
10	"The One I Wanted to Fight"; Transliteration: "Atashi ga Tatakaitakatta no wa" (Japanese: アタシが戦いたかったのは)	September 7, 2018
The final round between Haruka &\ Kanata and Emily & Claire begins, with the latter team bringing out their seriousness. However, Haruka and Kanata soon begin their plan to throw the sisters off balance, evening the score. Emily, recalling how she and Claire once lost against Kanata and Narumi, shows her determination to become stronger and support Claire, winning the first set.
11	"At This Point, We're Basically Playing Head-to-Head"; Transliteration: "Koko Made Kitara Makkō Shōbu" (Japanese: ここまできたら真っ向勝負)	September 14, 2018
Claire recalls how she was determined to beat Kanata following her first loss against her, but thought she would never obtain a satisfactory victory after Kanata had become stricken with fear. After Haruka and Kanata manage to win the second set, they use what they learned from their match with the Arikawa sisters to take advantage of the wind. As the match reaches its climax, Emily and Claire reach match point, but despites everyone else's fatigue, Kanata remains focused, allowing her and Haruka to reach deuce.
12	"And That's Why We Choose Our Irreplaceable Partners"; Transliteration: "Dakara Watashi-tachi wa, Kakegae no Nai Hitori o Erabu" (Japanese: だから私たちは、かけがえのない一人を選ぶ)	September 21, 2018
Following an intense deuce, Haruka manages to successfully block Claire's spike, winning the match and the tournament. As Emily comforts Claire over their defeat, Haruka and Kanata receive a message from Narumi telling them to be happy with their victory. Later, as the gang celebrate with a barbecue, Emily and Kanata thank Akari for helping everyone stay together, while Claire entrusts her and Emily's scrunchies with Haruka, urging her and Kanata to win the nationals in their place.

=== Video game ===
Characters from the series appear alongside other Manga Time Kirara characters in the 2018 mobile RPG, Kirara Fantasia.

== Reception ==
Lauren Orsini from Anime News Network describes the greatest strength in Harukana Receive to be sharing "the story of that joy, skimming over anything that wasn't important" and highlighting that, in spite of the emotional intensity in some of the beach volleyball matches, messages of friendship and enthusiasm are strongly at the forefront in the anime, even if the stakes might not be as high as those of other series in the season. Orsini further characterizes Harukana Receive as being a solid summer anime, with a relaxing, warm story about beach volleyball and players who are passionate about the sport. Stig Høgset, writing for THEM Anime Reviews, praised the series for providing "dynamic fanservice" that showcase the cast's natural athletic build during the volleyball scenes that display "pretty nice animation work" through various maneuvers, calling it, "A fun, energetic sports show with lots of sportsmanship to spare."
