= Riko Koike =

Japanese voice actress and singer

- 小池理子
- Born: 1 January 1991 (age 35)
- Occupation: Voice actress
- Years active: 2015–present
- Employer: Millennium Pro
- Notable work: Caracal in Kemono Friends 2; Myamu in Waccha PriMagi!

Riko Koike (Japanese: 小池 理子, Hepburn: Koike Riko; born 1 January 1991) is a Japanese voice actress from Fukui, Fukui Prefecture, affiliated with Millennium Pro. Inspired by the 1994 film Mobile Fighter G Gundam, her voice acting career began in 2015 when she voiced Paru in Chain Chronicle, and she has also starred as Caracal in Kemono Friends 2 and Myamu in Waccha PriMagi!.

== Biography ==
Riko Koike, a native of Fukui, Fukui Prefecture, was born on 1 January 1991. Inspired to go into voice acting by the 1994 film Mobile Fighter G Gundam, She was educated at Tokyo Woman's Christian University and Arcadia Voice Actor Academy.

In May 2015, Koike passed the second screening of the Chain Chronicle Character Voice Audition. She won the Chain Chronicle Developer Award at the final public audition held on Nippon Cultural Broadcasting in July 2015, and she eventually voiced Paru in the game. In 2016, she voiced characters in Dream Festival! and Magic-kyun! Renaissance.

In 2018, Koike starred as Caracal, a main character in Kemono Friends 2, and she reprised her role in the 2020 video game. In 2021, it was announced that she would star as Myamu, a major character in Waccha PriMagi!; she also sang the second ending theme song "Check One Two" (alongside Rie Hikisaka, and Sunao Yoshikawa). She also voiced Mai Sunagawa in Harukana Receive, a young Lucio Cortes in Rusted Armors: Daybreak, and the protagonist in Sore Shikanai Wake Nai Deshō.

Koike's special skills are plastic modeling and railway research.

== Filmography ==
=== Animated television ===
Year	Title	Role	Ref.
2016	Dream Festival!		
2016	Magic-kyun! Renaissance		
2018	Harukana Receive	Mai Sunagawa	
2020	The Genie Family 2020	high school girl	
2021	Waccha PriMagi!	Myamu	
2022	Rusted Armors: Daybreak	young Lucio Cortes	
2023	Sore Shikanai Wake Nai Deshō	Protagonist	

=== Video games ===
Year	Title	Role	Ref.
2015	Chain Chronicle	Paru	
2015	Chaos Dragon	Sakuyamimana	
2019	Duel Masters Place	Polegun	
2020	Kemono Friends 2	Caracal	
