= Saki Miyashita =

Japanese voice actress

- 宮下 早紀
- Born: December 4 Kanagawa Prefecture, Japan
- Occupation: Voice actress
- Years active: 2016–present
- Agent: Haikyō
- Known for: Harukana Receive as Kanata Higa; After School Dice Club as Miki Takekasa; LBX Girls as Suzuno; The Detective Is Already Dead as Siesta; Umamusume: Pretty Derby as Still in Love

Saki Miyashita (宮下 早紀, Miyashita Saki; born December 4) is a Japanese voice actress from Kanagawa Prefecture who is currently affiliated with Haikyō. She made her debut in 2016, and in 2018 she played her first main role as Kanata Higa in the anime television series Harukana Receive. She is also known for her roles as Miki Takekasa in After School Dice Club, Suzuno in LBX Girls, Siesta in The Detective Is Already Dead and Still in Love in Umamusume: Pretty Derby.

== Career ==
Miyashita started her career after passing an audition held by the voice acting talent agency Sigma Seven. Her activities began in 2016, with a background role in the anime series Aikatsu Stars!. In 2018, she played her first main role as Kanata Higa in the anime series Harukana Receive; she and co-star Kana Yūki performed the series' opening theme "Fly Two Blue". In 2019, she voiced Mayo Ojōsa in Hitori Bocchi no Marumaru Seikatsu and Miki Takekasa in After School Dice Club; she and her After School Dice Club co-stars performed the song "On The Board", which was used as the series' ending theme. In 2021, she played the roles of Suzuno in Little Battlers Experience and Siesta in The Detective Is Already Dead.

== Filmography ==
=== Anime ===
2016

- Aikatsu Stars!, Student

2017

- Chronos Ruler, Student B
- Anime-Gatari, Companion (episode 5)

2018

- Persona 5: The Animation, Mika
- Harukana Receive, Kanata Higa

2019

- The Magnificent Kotobuki, Ane-san (episodes 4, 11-12)
- Hitori Bocchi no Marumaru Seikatsu, Mayo Ojōsa
- After School Dice Club, Miki Takekasa

2020

- Magia Record, Classmate (episode 1)
- Mr Love: Queen's Choice, Female student

2021

- Wonder Egg Priority, Yae Yoshida (episode 6)
- LBX Girls, Suzuno
- Horimiya, Female high school student (episode 2)
- The Detective Is Already Dead, Siesta

2022

- More Than a Married Couple, But Not Lovers, Shiori Sakurazaka

2023

- The Girl I Like Forgot Her Glasses, Yuika Hibuchi

2024

- Failure Frame: I Became the Strongest and Annihilated Everything with Low-Level Spells, Celes Ashrain
- Tower of God 2nd Season, Mana / Yeo Miseng

2026

- Noble Reincarnation: Born Blessed, So I'll Obtain Ultimate Power, Zoey

=== Anime films ===
2025

- Virgin Punk: Clockwork Girl, Ubu Kamigori

=== Video games ===
- Paradigm Paradox as Kaori
- Heaven Burns Red as Erika Aoi
- Umamusume: Pretty Derby as Still in Love
- Umamusume: Pretty Derby - Party Dash as Still in Love
