= Nao Fujita =

Japanese voice actress

- 藤田 奈央
- Born: Nara Prefecture, Japan
- Occupation: Voice actress
- Years active: 2012 - present
- Agent: VIMS
- Height: 166 cm (5 ft 5 in)

Nao Fujita (藤田 奈央, Fujita Nao) (born May 14) is a Japanese voice actress from Nara Prefecture. She is affiliated with VIMS.

== Filmography ==
=== Television animation ===
- AKB0048 (2012) (Shop clerk)
- Nukko (2012) (Rakko)
- Keijo (2016) (Miyo Harada)
- Harukana Receive (2018) (Akane Ozora)
- The Promised Neverland (2019) (Sister Krone)
- Fruits Basket: The Final (2021) (Kazuma's Grandmother)

=== DVD animation ===
- Marimo no Hana ~Saikyō Butō Hashō Gakusei Densetsu~ (2012) (Tetsu Nakamura)

=== Drama CD ===
- Akiyama-kun (????) (Shiba's Mother)

=== Original net animation ===
- JoJo's Bizarre Adventure: Stone Ocean (2021) (Tanned Prisoner)

=== Video games ===
- Gal*Gun (2011) (Mari Amano, Natsuko Takizawa, Chōko Mita)
- Time and Eternity (2012) (Additional voice)
- Marvel Tōkon: Fighting Souls (2026) (Promoter)

=== Dubbing roles ===
==== Live-action ====
- 90210 (young Marla Templeton (Annie Little))
- Emma's Chance (Lexi Smith (Christina Robinson)
- Florence Foster Jenkins (Agnes Stark (Nina Arianda))
- Freakier Friday (Ms. Waldman (X Mayo))
- The Handmaid's Tale (Moira Strand (Samira Wiley))
- The Hitman's Bodyguard (Amelia Roussel (Élodie Yung))
- Indiana Jones and the Dial of Destiny (Mason (Shaunette Renée Wilson))
- The Neon Demon (Gigi (Bella Heathcote))
- The Night Before (Betsy Greenberg (Jillian Bell))
- Nurse Jackie (Black paramedic)
- Proven Innocent (Violet Bell (Nikki M. James))
- A Star Is Born (Paulette Stone (Drena De Niro))
- Tomb Raider (Mrs. Ahuja (Rekha John-Cheriyan))
- The Trust (The Woman (Sky Ferreira))
- The Wailing (Moo-myung (Chun Woo-hee))
- The White Queen (Elizabeth Woodville (Rebecca Ferguson))

==== Animation ====
- My Little Pony: Friendship Is Magic (Zecora, Sapphire Shores)
