= Cockroach Poker =

German card game

- Designers: Jacques Zeimet
- Illustrators: Rolf Vogt
- Publishers: Drei Magier Spiele
- Publication: 2004; 22 years ago
- Genres: Card game
- Players: 2–6
- Playing time: 20–30 minutes
- Age range: 8+
- Website: https://www.dreimagier.de/home.html

Cockroach Poker (German: Kakerlakenpoker) is a bluffing card game designed by Jacques Zeimet and published in 2004 by Drei Magier Spiele. Players pass around cards and try to avoid getting too many of the same type by deceiving other players about the cards's identities. The game was the first in Drei Magier Speile's Ugly Animals card game series. In 2012, the spin-off Cockroach Poker Royal was released.

== Gameplay ==
Cockroach Poker is played with a special deck of 64 cards which feature eight creature types (cockroach, bat, fly, toad, rat, scorpion, spider, and stink bug) and which are dealt evenly between all players. The first player chooses a card from their hand and passes it to any other player face down, claiming it to be a specific type of card. The receiving player can either:

1. Announce whether they believe the statement is a lie or not and then accept the card. If the player's belief is correct then the passing player takes back the card, and if its incorrect then the receiving player takes it. The card is then laid out face up in front of the respective player.
2. Look at the card and pass it to another player who has not seen it, again specifying a type. This statement does not have to match the previous player's claim.

The card moves from player to player until a player accepts the card or until only one player has not seen it. The last player must then accept the card and guess whether or not the passing player's statement is true. The player who lost the last round and received the face up card is the starting player of the next round.

The game ends when a player has four cards of the same type in front of them, or when a player has no more cards in their hand and has to play a card. In both cases, that player loses the game while all other players win.

=== Cockroach Poker Royal ===
Cockroach Poker Royal is a standalone game based on Cockroach Poker that was released in 2012. The card set consists of 66 instead of 64 cards, containing an even number of seven types (cockroach, bat, fly, toad, rat, scorpion, and stink bug) as well as one royal card for each species type, and two special cards. The "joker" special card counts as any animal type but not as a royal, and the "other" special card is wrong for all claims. Both are taken face up and are added to the player's hand when received and the player must then play one of their hand cards according the last claim or any two other hand cards.

To play, seven cards are placed face down as a penalty pile, and the top card is revealed. All other cards are distributed evenly to the players. As in Cockroach Poker, the starting player passes a card to any opponent and claims a card type. The target player can then accept the card or pass it on with the same or a different claim. If a player receives a royal card, they must also take the top, face-up card from the penalty pile and place it in front of them. The game ends when a player has four cards in front of them, or when a player runs out of cards and must play a card.

== Reception ==
Cockroach Poker was nominated for the 2004 Spiel des Jahres. It was also nominated for the 2004 Á la Carte Card Game Prize and received third place. In 2005, it was voted second for the "Best Foreign Game for Beginners" category of U-more's Japan Boardgame Prize. It was nominated for the 2006 As d'Or - Jeu de l'Année award.

=== Reviews ===
- Rebel Times #6 (review of Polish edition, released under the name Blefuj!)
