= Children's Playground Entertainment =

Japanese animation studio

Children's Playground Entertainment Co., Ltd.
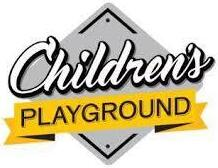

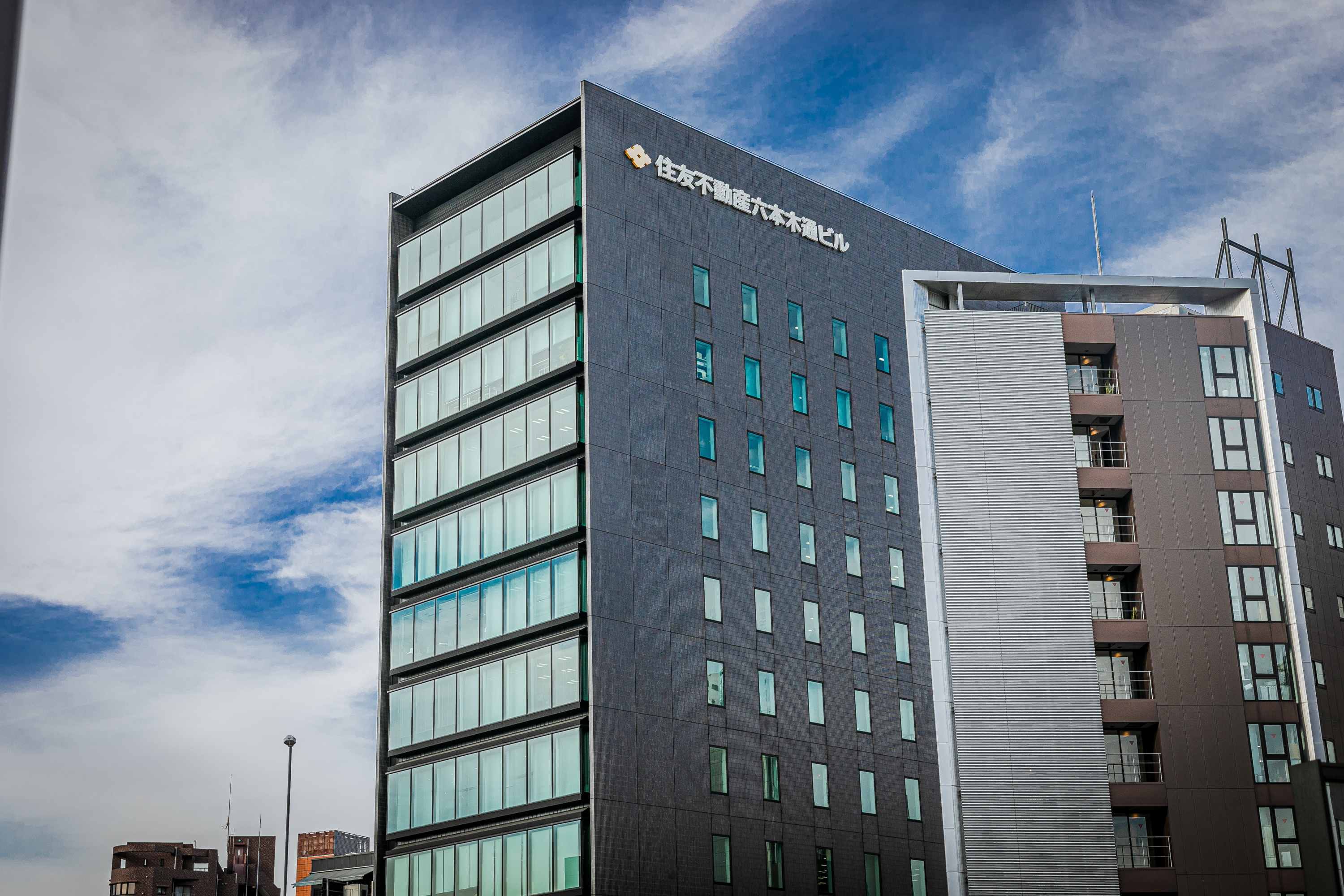
- Headquarters in Minato, Tokyo
- Native name: Children's Playground Entertainment 株式会社
- Romanized name: Children's Playground Entertainment Kabushiki-gaisha
- Type: Kabushiki-gaisha
- Industry: Mass media; Japanese animation
- Founded: April 2010; 16 years ago
- Headquarters: Roppongi, Minato, Tokyo, Japan
- Number of locations: 2 (Tokyo, Shanghai)
- Total equity: ¥ 98,000,000
- Owner: Bilibili
- Website: www.cspg.co/ja

Children's Playground Entertainment Co., Ltd. (Japanese: Children's Playground Entertainment 株式会社, Hepburn: Children's Playground Entertainment Kabushiki-gaisha) is a Japanese animation studio based in Minato, Tokyo. The studio was founded in April 2010 and owned by Bilibili.

== Works ==
=== Television series ===
Title	Director(s)	First run start date	First run end date	Eps	Note(s)	Ref(s)
Egg Car	Akira Iwamoto	July 26, 2019	October 11, 2020	52	Original work.	
Hatena Illusion	Shin Matsuo	January 9, 2020	June 3, 2020	12	Based on a light novel by Tomohiro Matsu.	
Tsukiuta. The Animation (season 2)	Yukio Nishimoto	October 7, 2020	December 30, 2020	13	Original work.	
The Faraway Paladin (season 1)	Yukio Nishimoto	October 9, 2021	January 3, 2022	12	Based on a light novel by Kanata Yanagino.	
The Foolish Angel Dances with the Devil	Itsuro Kawasaki	January 9, 2024	March 26, 2024	12	Based on a manga by Sawayoshi Azuma.	
