= Mitsutaka Hirota =

Japanese anime screenwriter

- 広田 光毅
- Born: August 18, 1967 (age 59); Osaka Prefecture, Japan
- Occupation: Screenwriter

Mitsutaka Hirota (広田 光毅, Hirota Mitsutaka; born August 18, 1967) is a Japanese screenwriter. After graduating from Tamagawa University, he went on to study screenwriting at Scenario Center Osaka and graduated.

== Filmography ==
- Series head writer denoted in bold

=== Anime television series ===
- Viewtiful Joe (anime) (2004–2005)
- Taiko no Tatsujin (anime) (2005–2006)
- Tōhai Densetsu Akagi: Yami ni Maiorita Tensai (2005–2006)
- Kage Kara Mamoru! (2006)
- Ramen Fighter Miki (2006)
- **Fairy Musketeers** (2006–2007; with Toshimitsu Takeuchi and Yûko Kakihara)
- Hataraki Man (2006)
- Kamichama Karin (2007)
- Robby & Kerobby (2007–2008)
- Dragonaut: The Resonance (2007–2008)
- Kaiji: Ultimate Survivor (2007–2008)
- Itazura na Kiss (2008)
- Kemeko Deluxe! (2008)
- One Outs (2008–2009)
- Stitch! (2008–2009)
- Fresh Pretty Cure! (2009–2010)
- Hakuoki: Demon of the Fleeting Blossom (2010)
- Lilpri (2010–2011)
- Rainbow: Nisha Rokubō no Shichinin (2010)
- Hakuoki: Record of the Jade Blood (2010)
- Kaiji: Against All Rules (2011)
- **X-Men (anime)** (2011)
- Hunter × Hunter (2011–2014)
- Persona 4: The Animation (2011–2012)
- Brave 10 (2012)
- **The Prince of Tennis II** (2012)
- Buta (TV special) (2012)
- Hakuoki: Dawn of the Shinsengumi (2012)
- Yu-Gi-Oh! Zexal II (2012–2014)
- Hakkenden: Eight Dogs of the East (2013)
- **Tetsujin 28 Gou Gao!** (2013–2016)
- Pokémon Origins (2013)
- **Carino Coni** (2014)
- Dragon Collection (2014–2015)
- Yu-Gi-Oh! Arc-V (2014–2017)
- **Samurai Jam -Bakumatsu Rock-** (2014)
- Castle Town Dandelion (2015)
- **Phantasy Star Online 2 the Animation** (2016)
- **Bonobono** (2016–present)
- **Sweetness and Lightning** (2016)
- **Nanbaka** (2016)
- Time Travel Girl (2016)
- Yu-Gi-Oh! VRAINS (2017–2019)
- Nana Maru San Batsu (2017)
- **Anime-Gatari** (2017)
- Hug! Pretty Cure (2018–2019)
- **Mr. Tonegawa: Middle Management Blues** (2018)
- **Zoids Wild** (2018–2019)
- Conception (anime) (2018)
- **Egg Car** (2019)
- Star Twinkle PreCure (2019–2020)
- Actors: Songs Connection (2019)
- Healin' Good Pretty Cure (2020–2021)
- **Rent-A-Girlfriend** (2020–2023)
- So I'm a Spider, So What? (2021)
- Sorcerous Stabber Orphen: Battle of Kimluck (2021)
- **Edens Zero** (2021–2023)
- Seirei Gensouki: Spirit Chronicles (2021)
- Waccha PriMagi! (2021–2022)
- **The Prince of Tennis II: U-17 World Cup** (2022)
- **Shoot! Goal to the Future** (2022)
- **Bibliophile Princess** (2022)
- **Reborn to Master the Blade: From Hero-King to Extraordinary Squire** (2023)
- **Why Raeliana Ended Up at the Duke's Mansion** (2023)
- Helck (2023)
- **Sweet Reincarnation** (2023)
- **Tonbo!** (2024)
- **My Wife Has No Emotion** (2024)
- **Days with My Stepsister** (2024)
- **The Prince of Tennis II: U-17 World Cup Semifinal** (2024)
- **Possibly the Greatest Alchemist of All Time** (2025)
- **Reincarnated as a Neglected Noble: Raising My Baby Brother with Memories from My Past Life** (2025)
- **This Monster Wants to Eat Me** (2025)
- **The Dark History of the Reincarnated Villainess** (2025)
- **You Can't Be in a Rom-Com with Your Childhood Friends!** (2026)
- **Dead Account** (2026)
- **I Became a Legend After My 10 Year-Long Last Stand** (2026)
- **A Livid Lady's Guide to Getting Even** (2026)
- **The Cat and the Dragon** (2026)
- **The Final-Boss Prince Is Somehow Obsessed with the Chubby Villainess: Reincarnated Me** (2027)

=== Original video animation ===
- The Prince of Tennis OVA: The National Tournament (2006–2007)
- The Prince of Tennis OVA: Another Story (2009)
- Hakuoki: A Memory of Snow Flowers (2011–2012)
- Hero Company (OVA) (2015)

=== Original net animation ===
- **Nanbaka (ONA)** (2017)
- **The Prince of Tennis II: Hyotei vs. Rikkai - Game of Future** (2021)

=== Films ===
- The Prince of Tennis – The Battle of the British City! (2011)
- Persona 4: The Animation -The Factor of Hope- (2012)
- Bayonetta: Bloody Fate (2013)
- Avengers Confidential: Black Widow & Punisher (2014)
- Digimon Adventure tri. (2015–2018)
- Yowamushi Pedal: Spare Bike (2016)
- The Prince of Tennis: Best Games!! (2018–2019)
- Korasho no Kaitei Wakuwaku Daibouken! (2019)
