= Reincarnated as a Neglected Noble =

Japanese light novel series

- Reincarnated as a Neglected Noble: Raising My Baby Brother With Memories From My Past Life
- First light novel volume cover

白豚貴族ですが前世の記憶が生えたのでひよこな弟育てます (Shiro Buta Kizoku desu ga Zense no Kioku ga Haeta node Hiyoko na Otōto Sodatemasu)
- Genre: Isekai
- Novel series
- Written by: Yashiro
- Published by: Shōsetsuka ni Narō
- Original run: August 28, 2018 – present
- Light novel
- Written by: Yashiro
- Illustrated by: keepout
- Published by: TO Books
- Imprint: TO Bunko
- Original run: January 10, 2020 – present
- Volumes: 17
- Manga
- Written by: Yashiro
- Illustrated by: Yokowake
- Published by: TO Books
- English publisher: NA: MangaPlaza
- Imprint: Corona Comics
- Magazine: Comic Corona
- Original run: August 31, 2020 – present
- Volumes: 7
- Anime television series
- Directed by: Masafumi Satō
- Written by: Mitsutaka Hirota
- Music by: Arisa Okehazama
- Studio: Studio Comet
- Licensed by: Crunchyroll
- Original network: Tokyo MX, ytv, BS Fuji, AT-X
- Original run: July 6, 2025 – September 21, 2025 (Note: Episodes were released on ABEMA and Crunchyroll three months before their televised airings, and streamed from April 20 to June 29, 2025.)
- Episodes: 12

Reincarnated as a Neglected Noble: Raising My Baby Brother With Memories From My Past Life (白豚貴族ですが前世の記憶が生えたのでひよこな弟育てます, Shiro Buta Kizoku desu ga Zense no Kioku ga Haeta node Hiyoko na Otōto Sodatemasu; "I'm a White Pig Aristocrat, But I Regained My Memories from My Previous Life, So I'm Raising a Younger Brother") is a Japanese light novel series written by Yashiro and illustrated by keepout. It began serialization online in August 2018 on the user-generated novel publishing website Shōsetsuka ni Narō. It was later acquired by TO Books, who have published seventeen volumes since January 2020. A manga adaptation with art by Yokowake has been serialized online via TO Books' Nico Nico Seiga-based Comic Corona manga service since August 2020 and has been collected in seven tankōbon volumes. An anime television series adaptation produced by Studio Comet aired from July to September 2025.

== Characters ==
Ageha (鳳蝶)
Voiced by: Misaki Kuno (drama CD, anime), Haruki Ishiya (drama CD, previous incarnation)
Regulus (レグルス, Regurusu)
Voiced by: Mariya Ise (drama CD, anime), Chiaki Kobayashi (drama CD, adult)
Aleksei Romanov (アレクセイ・ロマノフ, Arekusei Romanofu)
Voiced by: Shun'ichi Toki (drama CD, anime)
Princess Hyakka (百華公主, Hyakka Kōshu)
Voiced by: Aki Toyosaki (drama CD, anime)
Rottenmeyer (ロッテンマイヤー, Rottenmaiyā)
Voiced by: Haruhi Nanao (drama CD, anime)
Alice Utsunomiya (宇都宮アリス, Utsunomiya Arisu)
Voiced by: Rie Hikisaka (drama CD, anime)
Victor (ヴィクトル, Vikutoru)
Voiced by: Kōji Yusa (anime)
Igor (イゴール, Igōru)
Voiced by: Ayumu Murase (anime)
Laala (ラーラ, Rāra)
Voiced by: Hiroki Nanami (anime)
Ageha's father (鳳蝶の父, Ageha no chichi)
Voiced by: Daisuke Hirakawa (drama CD)
Ageha's mother (鳳蝶の母, Ageha no haha)
Voiced by: Azusa Enoki (drama CD)
Sebastian (セバスチャン, Sebasuchan)
Voiced by: Tadaaki Doi (drama CD)
Dominique Laurent (ドミニク・ローラン, Dominiku Rōran)
Voiced by: Shunichi Maki (drama CD)

== Media ==
=== Light novel ===
Written by Yashiro, Reincarnated as a Neglected Noble: Raising My Baby Brother With Memories From My Past Life began serialization on the user-generated novel publishing website Shōsetsuka ni Narō on August 28, 2018. It was later acquired by TO Books who began publishing the series with illustrations by keepout under their TO Bunko light novel imprint on January 10, 2020. Fifteen volumes have been released as of September 2026.

No.	Release date	ISBN
1	January 10, 2020	978-4-86472-898-0
2	May 9, 2020	978-4-86472-982-6
3	September 19, 2020	978-4-86699-045-3
4	January 20, 2021	978-4-86699-112-2
5	June 10, 2021	978-4-86699-231-0
6	January 20, 2022	978-4-86699-406-2
7	April 20, 2022	978-4-86699-502-1
8	September 20, 2022	978-4-86699-669-1
9	March 10, 2023	978-4-86699-797-1
10	May 20, 2023	978-4-86699-849-7
11	February 15, 2024	978-4-86794-091-4
12	July 20, 2024	978-4-86794-253-6
13	January 15, 2025	978-4-86794-425-7
14	July 1, 2025	978-4-86794-616-9
15	August 20, 2025	978-4-86794-671-8
16	April 10, 2026	978-4-86794-963-4
17	September 10, 2026	978-4-86854-120-2

=== Manga ===
A manga adaptation with art by Yokowake began serialization on TO Books' Nico Nico Seiga-based manga service Comic Corona on August 31, 2020. The manga's chapters have been compiled into seven tankōbon volumes as of July 2025.

The manga adaptation is published in English on NTT Solmare's MangaPlaza website and app.

No.	Release date	ISBN
1	March 1, 2021	978-4-86699-162-7
2	November 1, 2021	978-4-86699-362-1
3	June 15, 2022	978-4-86699-546-5
4	May 15, 2023	978-4-86699-843-5
5	February 15, 2024	978-4-86794-086-0
6	January 15, 2025	978-4-86794-406-6
7	July 1, 2025	978-4-86794-605-3

=== Stage play ===
A stage play adaptation was held at the Shinjukumura Performing Theater in Shinjuku, Tokyo between March 24 and 28, 2021.

Another stage play adaptation featuring an all-female cast was held at CBGK Shikugeki!! between October 18 and 22, 2023.

=== Anime ===
An anime television series adaptation was announced on July 17, 2024. It is produced by Studio Comet and directed by Masafumi Satō, with series composition by Mitsutaka Hirota, character designs by Tomoko Miyakawa, and music composed by Arisa Okehazama. While the series streamed on ABEMA and Crunchyroll from April 20 to June 29, 2025, it aired from July 6 to September 21 of the same year, on Tokyo MX and other networks. The opening theme song is "Kuchinaoshi" (ギフにテッド; Palate Cleanser), performed by Wanuka, while the ending theme song is "Mada Shiranai Story" (まだ知らないストーリー; Yet Unknown Story), performed by Ms.Ooja.

==== Episodes ====
No.	Title	Directed by	Written by	Storyboarded by	Original release date
1	"I Got My Memories From My Past Life Back!"; Transliteration: "Zensei no Kioku ga Haemashita" (Japanese: 前世の記憶が生えました)	Masafumi Satō	Mitsutaka Hirota	Masafumi Satō	July 6, 2025
Ageha Kikunoi, eldest son of Count Kikunoi of the Kiou Empire, possesses memories of being a middle aged Japanese man who had several creative hobbies. Given he is 5 years old and overweight Ageha begins exercising. He also realises his absentee parents are not very nice and the servants only talk to him because it is their job, so he decides to atone for being a brat. After apologising to them all, especially his maid Rottenmeier, the servants slowly accept him and he resumes many former hobbies. From his elf tutor Aleksei he learns his parents actively oppress the lower classes, contributing to the friction between the Eastern and Western halves of the Empire. Aleksei notes Ageha has A rank skills in many creative areas but E ranks in martial skills. One day Hyakka, Goddess of Healing and Blessing, decides to reward him for his excellent singing by unlocking his latent magical abilities and granting the title Beloved of the Goddess. Despite the danger Aleksei confronts the Goddess himself to ensure her intentions won't be harmful to Ageha. The Goddess assures him they are not, but as punishment for his rudeness orders Aleksei to also tutor Ageha in singing. That night Ageha is told his parents are visiting for the first time in over a year.
2	"My First Time Meeting My Brother"; Transliteration: "Otōto to Shotaimen Shimashita" (Japanese: 弟と初対面しました)	Yoshito Tai	Mitsutaka Hirota	Seiki Ōsora	July 13, 2025
Aleksei demonstrates magic, enchanting a bag that can store as much as a large cupboard. Hyakka becomes intrigued with Ageha's memories of opera and gifts him a giant peach he stores in his new bag. Rottenmeier decides to tell Ageha the truth. His father was an impoverished noble who already had a fiancée he loved. Unfortunately, the selfish daughter of the former Count Kikunoi wanted him for herself so she pressured him into marrying her instead. Eventually she gave birth to Ageha, after which his father took his former fiancée as his mistress and move into a separate mansion with her. Unfortunately, his mistress died recently and left behind a 3 year old son, Ageha's half-brother Regulus, who will be moving into the mansion so Aleksei can tutor him as well. His parents eventually arrive; his mother is abusive and his father outright states he only cares about Regulus. His heart broken Ageha flees to his room. After calming down he returns to the front hall just in time to see his mother's butler Sebastien push Regulus down the stairs. Ageha manages to catch Regulus, saving his life. As he does so Ageha experiences a vision of an older Regulus trying to kill him.
3	"The Kikunoi Family's Circumstances"; Transliteration: "Kikunoi-san Chino Katei no Jijō" (Japanese: 菊乃井さんちの家庭の事情)	Maezono Fumio	Hiroko Kanasugi	Kazumi Nonaka	July 20, 2025
Regulus becomes attached to Ageha who shares Hyakka's peach with him. Aleksei refuses to tutor Regulus so his father will take him away, causing Regulus' maid Alice to yell at him. At a meeting with his parents Ageha learns Aleksei holds the title Designated Imperial Hero, meaning his only superior is the Emperor. Ageha realises his parents argument is about which of them is technically Alice's employer; since she shouted at an Imperial Hero it is legally her employer's fault. Ageha further learns Aleksei isn't technically his tutor; as a Hero he is allowed to demand lodging at the home of any noble, so when Ageha turned out to be interesting he began tutoring him voluntarily. Ageha decides he will teach Regulus everything Aleksei taught him, allowing Regulus to stay. Sebastien hints getting rid of Regulus would impress his mother but Ageha states outright such things are his parents business. He also reveals it was Sebastien who pushed Regulus, showing everyone what kind of man Sebastien is. He then demands his father pay for him tutoring Regulus, since Regulus is illegitimate, and to start a family business of some kind so Regulus has something to inherit one day. He also demands everything be written down in a contract kept safe by Aleksei. Ageha faints from a stress-fever and is put to bed.
4	"I Made Origami for My Brother, and Chawan-Mushi for Me"; Transliteration: "Otōto ni Orizuru, Watashi ni Chawanmushi o Tsukuttemimashita" (Japanese: 弟に折り鶴、私に茶碗蒸しを作ってみました)	Yurika Fukaya	Mitsutaka Hirota	Seiki Ōsora	July 27, 2025
Ageha introduces Regulus to Hyakka who takes an interest in Ageha's origami, so she decides to craft superior paper to make origami worthy of a Goddess. Missing Japanese cuisine Ageha convinces chef Maurice to experiment until he has sneakily gotten him to make Chawanmushi, a savoury egg dessert made with soy sauce and fish broth. Ageha learns his parents' oppression of commoner's means almost none can read or do sums, and decides in the future to introduce basic education. In order to educate Regulus Ageha is forced to make picture books himself. Aleksei is impressed Ageha is planning to introduce widespread education. Ageha keeps it secret he is actually preparing for when Regulus murders him and takes over the family, since at least it will be a territory with an educated, skilled population. Hyakka returns with the paper and Ageha makes her a beautiful butterfly. Ageha realises the paper was made by Igor, God of Innovation, using woodblock printing. He realises if he could get Igor to invent Letterpress printing it could allow mass production of books. Hyakka promises to pass the idea to Igor after learning it could be used to produce scripts for plays and maybe allow her to see an opera one day. She also considers supporting mass education. Ageha gets so excited he passes out from stress-fever again.
5	"I Don't Think I'm Going to Live a Long Life"; Transliteration: "Watashi, Amari Nagaiki Dekinai ki ga Shimasu" (Japanese: 私、あまり長生きできない気がします)	Kyōhei Suzuki	Hiroko Kanasugi	Shion	August 3, 2025
Alice is confused Ageha goes to extremes to educate and keep Regulus safe. Ageha tells Alice he doesn't think he will have a long life so he wants to raise Regulus into a good man and a capable lord. Alice decides to assist Ageha in making Regulus popular among the people, and to ensure Ageha lives as long as possible. Ageha senses something strange about Alice but cannot identify what. Aleksei reveals 6 months ago, when Ageha first awoke as himself, he had actually almost died of an illness. According to Hyakka it made the link between his body and soul weaker, which is why his illness keeps returning. Hyakka offers to research his condition and suggests Ageha start teaching Regulus to use a sword, since he seems to have hero potential. Aleksei also points out the fact Hyakka lets him see her must mean Ageha has potential as well, possibly as a great singer. Ageha doubts this so Aleksei decides to take him to the capital to see real singers, if Ageha embroiders 5 handkerchiefs for him first. Ageha and the gardener Genzo begin teaching Regulus about gardening and farming. Genzo turns out to be a retired adventurer and offers to train Regulus to use a sword.
6	"My Embroidery Sold"; Transliteration: "Watashi no Shishū ga Uremashita" (Japanese: 私の刺繍が売れました)	Kenichirō Watanabe	Mitsutaka Hirota	Kenichirō Watanabe	August 10, 2025
Alice explains Ageha's grandmother took Genzo in when injuries forced him to retire. She also took in Rottenmeier when her family tried to sell her. Ageha becomes curious about his grandparents whom he has never seen portraits of, suspecting his parents probably hid them from spite. He also becomes even more curious about Alice when she uses phrases common in Japan. Following Hyakka's suggestion Ageha begins singing lullabies for Regulus. Aleksei takes Ageha to the local adventurer guild and introduces him to Guildmaster Dominic. Dominic notes Ageha has resistance to mental attacks, not even noticing him use his psychic attack Pressure on him. Aleksei reveals Ageha's handkerchiefs embroidered with elvish runes boost magic. Dominic appraises them and is astounded one handkerchief can double magic output, and four quadruples it, meaning without realising it Ageha has received the skill Grace of Igor, making him a master craftsman. Dominic offers 2 gold coins for the handkerchiefs, causing Ageha to wonder if maybe he could start an entire industry, revitalising the local economy. Dominic is impressed and reveals Ageha's father has recently become more involved in the local economy. To draw adventurers to Kikunoi Dominic asks Ageha for cuisine ideas, having heard Ageha's chef has begun producing new and bizarre dishes.
7	"Using Magic to Visit the Capital"; Transliteration: "Teito e Majutsu de Okonattekimasu" (Japanese: 帝都へ魔術で行ってきます)	Maezono Fumio	Mitsutaka Hirota	Naoyuki Kuzuya	August 17, 2025
Dominic borrows the kitchen of the innkeeper Fiore and Ageha shows him how to make tonkatsu. Having made money for their trip, Ageha returns home and finds Rottenmeier and Alice completely exhausted from Regulus' all day tantrum from missing Ageha. Rottenmeier suspects Ageha's father purposefully left Regulus to be raised by Ageha. Aleksei uses teleportation magic to get Ageha to the capital to meet the best musician in the kingdom, the elf Viktor Shostakovich. Their arrival interrupts an argument between Viktor and the singer Maria Crowe, whom Viktor has refused to teach. With Ageha's arrival Viktor agrees to hear Maria sing and notices a mistake she tried to hide, denying herself a chance to improve. Ageha sings one of his songs perfectly so Maria invites him to her performance at the Imperial Theatre in 2 weeks. Viktor agrees to tutor Maria and to start Ageha's lessons in 2 months' time in exchange for more otherworld songs. Ageha purchases spices, planning to make curry and rice. He also visits a church and learns that of all the Gods, only Hyorin the God of Death and Rebirth has never been seen by a living person. He also prays to the statue of Igor, only for Igor to appear in person.
8	"H-Hello! It's an Honor To Meet You!"; Transliteration: "Wa, Hajimete Omenikakarimasu!" (Japanese: は、はじめてお目にかかりますっ！)	Fuse Yasuyuki	Hiroko Kanasugi	Shion	August 24, 2025
Igor explains Ageha's plans for education have the potential to improve all of humanity, which benefits both humans and Gods. Not wanting to disappoint Hyakka over the opera Ageha decides to one day open a music school. Before leaving Igor reveals it wasn't him that made Ageha a master craftsman, but Hyakka, in exchange for the origami. Ageha watches one of Regulus' training sessions where Regulus use magic for the first time. Hyakka visits with material she obtained from the God of Weaving and asks Ageha to make her something. She also reveals Ageha has Soul Separation Disease as a result of almost dying. According to Hyorin this has no cure but can be slowed by strengthening one's magic nerves which link the soul to the body; the stronger the nerves the harder it is for them to separate. Luckily, Ageha need only activate the nerves while singing in order to strengthen them, which Ageha had unknowingly been doing anyway. Regulus is disappointed there is no permanent cure, so Hyakka gives him another peach to cheer him up. Ageha regrets he may not see opera in his lifetime but assures Hyakka he is working hard so that future generations continue his work. Hyakka is willing to wait and assures Ageha if he dies too soon she will hold onto his soul until the time they can watch opera together.
9	"The Greatest Singer in the Empire Is Born!"; Transliteration: "Teikoku Ichi no Utahime, Tanjōdesu!" (Japanese: 帝国一の歌姫、誕生です！)	Yurika Fukaya	Hiroko Kanasugi	Kazumi Nonaka	August 31, 2025
Ageha has the peach made into sorbet. Ageha takes the material Hyakka gave him and makes her a peony hair ornament. Hyakka learns that in the otherworld women were often compared to flowers, so she decides to start paying more attention to her female worshippers. Aleksei teleports Ageha to the capital where Viktor reveals Maria has been promoted to Imperial Court Singer. Ageha learns there is a succession dispute between the first and second princes. Ageha visits the royal theatre to see Maria but finds she has been poisoned with a toxin designed to burn her throat before her debut as Court Singer. Viktor is unable to heal Maria's throat without leaving scars that will end her singing career. Hoping to make her feel better Ageha gives her the rest of the sorbet and the Sage Peach unexpectedly heals her. Maria decides to give her best performance yet and humiliate the second prince who was obviously behind the poisoning. Ageha gives Maria the second hair ornament he made, which Viktor and Aleksei realise has mystical properties. The concert is a success and at the party afterwards Viktor agrees to pass an important letter from Ageha to Maria. Viktor is also thrilled Hyakka gave him permission to use Ageha's otherworld songs. Aleksei decides it would be beneficial to take Ageha on even more outings to learn more about the world.
10	"My Heart Is Full of Teachings and Sincerity"; Transliteration: "Oshie to Magokoro de, Mune ga Ichi Hai desu" (Japanese: 教えと真心で、胸が一杯です)	Sato Masafumi	Mitsutaka Hirota	Shion	September 7, 2025
Hyakka is exasperated Ageha gave the peach away but realises Ageha doesn't know what a Sage Peach is. She explains Sage Peaches actually make you younger, heal injuries and bring forth hidden potential. Hyakka warns him not to let people take advantage of him. Ageha decides to learn as much as possible from adults he trusts. Aleksei is glad Ageha wants to learn more, compared to when he was younger and only cared about himself. Rottenmeier is concerned Ageha is worrying too much about the future while neglecting his youth. She also worries he is still unhealthy, so Ageha promises to do better. Ageha succeeds in making curry which he gives to Fiore, and soon adventurers begin visiting from all over the empire. Ageha is visited by Ilarion, another elf friend of Aleksei and Viktor, known collectively to the elven people as "The Three Idiots Who Like Humans". Ilarion explains he was Maria's childhood tutor in various disciplines, including weight loss, and Maria asked him to visit Ageha to repay him for healing her throat. Ageha is confused, until the others explain he will soon have to attend school, which includes official dances, so unless he gets in shape soon he won't be able to dance with noble ladies and might end up isolated and bullied. Ageha agrees to train with Ilarion immediately.
11	"I Made a Friend"; Transliteration: "Tomodachi Dekichaimashita" (Japanese: ともだちできちゃいました)	Seo Hye-jin	Mitsutaka Hirota	Tomoko Iwasaki	September 14, 2025
As Viktor has already started writing sheet music Hyakka rewards him with the First Flute, which belonged to the Elf Progenitor who also liked humans. Ageha meets Kanade, Genzo's grandson, who has run away after arguing with his parents. Kanade reveals his little brother broke his toy, yet Kanade was blamed for leaving it where his brother could reach it. Ageha points out everyone was at fault; Kanade for leaving the toy, his brother for breaking it, and his parents for only scolding Kanade. Due to his anger for his own parents Ageha almost falls ill again, but Kanade snaps him out of it. They decide to roast yams but while singing a campfire song the fire explodes and the elves realise Ageha used magic, substituting singing for spell-casting. Aleksei decides to teach Ageha magic while Viktor agrees to teach Regulus and Kanade magic too. Winter approaches so Ageha makes clothes for Regulus himself, not wanting to ask his father for money. Viktor suspects Ageha might be skilled at enchantment magic, since without realising it Ageha made a winter coat capable of resisting a Frost Dragon's breath. Maria informs Ageha the Empress was impressed by the pony hair ornament and has requested one for herself. Ilaria notes that if the Empress wears such an ornament they will become a fashion trend straight away and potentially a business opportunity. Ageha wonders if maybe his citizens could train as craftsmen, but then worries about criminals making forgeries and so on. Igor suddenly appears to everyone.
12	"I'll Use My Memories from a Past Life to Make a Business Deal"; Transliteration: "Zensei no Kioku o Ikashite Shōdan Shimasu" (Japanese: 前世の記憶を生かして商談します)	Kenichirō Watanabe	Mitsutaka Hirota	Kenichirō Watanabe	September 21, 2025
Igor requests Ageha make the hair ornament, since a noble he favours is seeking the Empress' help to pass laws protecting craftsmen. Ageha agrees but decides he must start a company and train his citizens as craftspeople. Igor mentions the noble possesses memories of a past life, so Ageha gives Igor curry powder as a gift for the noble. Ageha names his company Effet-Papillon (Butterfly Effect), hoping it will change the world. Ageha learns if he starts a company and passes a law that affects the finances of other nobles they may try to assassinate him, so Aleksei decides to publicly support him as the Imperial Hero. Regulus notices Ageha has actually lost weight. Kanade decides he wants to become educated in order to help Ageha. The three elves decide to invest their own money to help Ageha start Effet-Papillon. Hyakka informs Ageha he won't see her again until Spring since she has spent too long on earth and it has started to affect nature. Before leaving she enchants Ageha and Regulus so no harm can come to them in her absence. She also gives Ageha her own Tanto, warning him a good leader should never need a weapon, so if he is ever in a situation where he has to use it, it will be because he failed. As thanks, Ageha sings her one last song before she leaves, intending to become a success before Spring.

== See also ==
- Parallel World Pharmacy, another light novel series illustrated by keepout
- Reincarnated as the Daughter of the Legendary Hero and the Queen of Spirits, another light novel series illustrated by keepout
