= Bayonetta: Bloody Fate =

2013 anime film directed by Fuminori Kizaki

- Film poster for Bayonetta: Bloody Fate featuring (from top, left to right) Balder, Luka Jeanne, Bayonetta, and Cereza.

ベヨネッタ ブラッディフェイト (Beyonetta Buraddi Feito)
- Genre: Action, fantasy
- Anime film
- Directed by: Fuminori Kizaki
- Produced by: Hiroshi Naitō; Masahiro Nakayama; Shūji Kondō; Masanori Gotō; Shiki Yamazaki; Hidemasa Arai
- Written by: Mitsutaka Hirota
- Music by: Masato Kazune; Jun Abe
- Studio: Gonzo
- Licensed by: Crunchyroll
- Released: November 23, 2013
- Runtime: 91 minutes
- Manga
- Illustrated by: Mizuki Sakakibara
- Published by: Kodansha
- Magazine: Bessatsu Shōnen Magazine
- Original run: November 9, 2013 – December 9, 2013

Bayonetta: Bloody Fate (Note: Japanese: ベヨネッタ ブラッディフェイト, Hepburn: Beyonetta Buraddi Feito) is a 2013 Japanese animated fantasy action film directed by Fuminori Kizaki, written by Mitsutaka Hirota, and produced by Gonzo. It is an adaptation of the 2009 video game Bayonetta. Leading staff Hideki Kamiya and Yusuke Hashimoto, and original artist Mari Shimazaki, worked in supervisory roles. The plot follows the titular witch as she goes to the city of Vigrid to recover her memories, fighting figures from her past who are tied to a magical conspiracy to awaken the angelic creator Jubileus.

Work on Bloody Fate began in 2009 shortly after the game's release, beginning full production the following year. While Hashimoto helped with the draft, Kamiya withdrew from the project midway through production to give the staff creative freedom. Multiple staff cited challenges adapting the game's events into a 90 minute runtime, needing to both condense events and rework the characters. The main theme, "Night, I Stand", was written and performed by Mai. In contrast to the original game, a Japanese dub was included, with Atsuko Tanaka voicing Bayonetta: the film shared its Japanese cast with Bayonetta 2 (2014).

In Japan, the film saw a limited two-week theatrical run starting on November 23, 2013, then saw a DVD and Blu-ray release in February 2014. The English dub was recorded during May and June 2014. Most of the game's English cast reprised their roles including Bayonetta's voice actor Hellena Taylor. The English version released worldwide on DVD and Blu-ray in October 2014. Reviewers praised Bayonetta's characterisation, the action scenes, and its faithfulness to the game's story. Opinions on the plot were varied, and several noted limited animation outside the action.

== Plot ==
Five centuries ago, two clans—the Umbra Witches and the Lumen Sages—oversaw the world and guarded a power dubbed the Eyes of the World, capable of reincarnating the divine Jubileus and remaking the world. When a child possessing the Left Eye of the World is born from a forbidden affair between a Witch and Sage, the clans descend into a war which leads to mutual destruction. The child is raised as an outcast witch, but ends up sealed away from the world in a magical coma. Twenty years before the film's events, the witch is awoken: suffering from amnesia, she is taken in by the weapon smith Rodin and given the name Bayonetta, fighting monstrous angels to appease her demonic pact partners and empower herself. In the present, after getting a tip from her underworld colleague Enzo, Bayonetta aims to find clues to her memory in Vigrid, a city controlled by a religious sect devoted to Jubileus. She is pursued by Luka Redgrave, an investigative journalist who blames Bayonetta for the death of his father when the latter found and released her.

Upon reaching Vigrid, Bayonetta is attacked by Jeanne, another Umbra Witch who is working with Balder, leader of Vigrid's cult and the last Lumen Sage. She also runs into Cereza, a young girl who mistakes Bayonetta for her mother. She reluctantly protects Cereza from angel attacks, then leaves her with Luka to continue her journey to Balder's headquarters, regaining pieces of her memory along the way while facing powerful angels sent to test her strength. Luka is granted the ability to see the angels by Cereza, who also has magical powers, and begins to doubt Bayonetta's guilt for his father's death. In a final fight with Jeanne, Bayonetta remembers their friendly rivalry, and that after falling into despair with the death of her mother Rosa, she was sealed away by Jeanne to protect the Left Eye from the angels. A defeated Jeanne tells her to stop Balder before seemingly sacrificing herself to protect Bayonetta from an angel attack.

When Bayonetta and Luka reach Balder, they learn he is Cereza's father, and he sends the young girl away through a magical portal: Bayonetta realises Cereza is her younger self transported through time. Balder, who possesses the Right Eye of the World, wishes to awaken Jubileus and remake the world in revenge for Rosa's death. He brought Cereza to her adult self to help unlock Bayonetta's memories and awaken the Left Eye, and reveals he had Luka's father killed when he found Bayonetta on Balder's orders. Luka is attacked but survives and escapes, while Bayonetta incapacitated when she awakens as the Left Eye. Jeanne, having survived, rescues Bayonetta and the two defeat the incomplete Jubileus, killing Balder in the process. A year later, Rodin and Enzo have not seen Bayonetta return, and Luka visits his father's grave and makes peace with events. Bayonetta and Jeanne, now reunited as friends, are wiping out the remaining angels on Earth.

== Voice cast ==
- Bayonetta is the main character, an amnesiac Umbran Witch skilled in magical combat and noted for a fighting style which uses guns strapped to both her hands and feet. Bayonetta is voiced by Atsuko Tanaka in Japanese, and Hellena Taylor in English.
- Jeanne, a woman with ties to Bayonetta's past with a similar fighting style and magical prowess. Like Bayonetta, she is one of the last Umbran Witches, acting as a friendly rival to Bayonetta. Jeanne is voiced by Mie Sonozaki in Japanese, and Grey DeLisle in English.
- Luka Redgrave, an investigative journalist who pursues Bayonetta to discover the truth about his father's death, initially harboring a deep hatred for her. Bayonetta has given him the nickname "Cheshire". Luka is voiced by Daisuke Namikawa in Japanese, and Yuri Lowenthal in English.
- Cereza, a young girl who is encountered by Bayonetta on her journey. She believes Bayonetta is her mother and becomes immediately attached to her. Cereza's true identity is a young Bayonetta transported from the past. Cereza is voiced by Miyuki Sawashiro in Japanese, and Joy Jillian in English.
- Balder, the secretive leader of the Ithavoll Group and a religious figurehead for the Ragnar religious sect which dominates the city of Vigrid. He is the last of the Lumen Sages, and Bayonetta's father. Balder is voiced by Norio Wakamoto in Japanese, and J. Grant Albrecht in English.
- Rodin, proprietor of the "Gates of Hell" bar. He also works secretly as a weapons maker, offering both conventional and magical weapons. Rodin is voiced by Tesshō Genda in Japanese, and Dave Fennoy in English.
- Enzo, an underworld information broken who works with Bayonetta on jobs, and provides her with the initial tip which sends her on her journey. Enzo is voiced by Wataru Takagi in Japanese, and John Kassir in English.

== Production ==
Fuminori Kizaki (left, pictured 2013) was the director for Bayonetta: Bloody Fate.

The original video game Bayonetta was developed by PlatinumGames and published by Sega in 2009 in Japan and 2010 internationally. Work began on Bloody Fate in 2009, with full work starting in 2010 and storyboarding beginning in 2012. The film was created by animation studio Gonzo. The staff included Fuminori Kizaki as both film and storyboard director, writer Mitsutaka Hirota, character designer Ai Yokoyama, Hiroya Iijima designing the angels, and mechanical designers Katanao Akai and Takashi Watabe designing the creatures and weapons respectively. The music was co-composed by Masato Kazune and Jun Abe, while the Avex Entertainment singer-songwriter Mai wrote and performed the theme song "Night, I Stand". The game's creator and director Hideki Kamiya, and producer Yusuke Hashinoto, were credited in supervisory roles. Original character designer Mari Shimazaki also supervised the character art. While production ran parrelel with the sequel Bayonetta 2 (2014), the two projects were unrelated.

Kizaki, known for his work on the Afro Samurai adaptation, was chosen at an early stage to direct despite his reservations about the scope of the project. To prepare, he watched a compilation of in-game cutscenes to pick out elements that were important to carry over. While originally in a supervisory role, Kamiya pulled out midway through production to give the production staff greater creative freedom. Kizaki said the adaptation required "twice the usual effort" of other projects, and Hirota recalled feeling that it would be simpler to adapt the game as three films rather than condense it into one. Hashimoto helped create the story draft. To fit the game's events into film form, several parts had to be either severely condensed or cut entirely, but the team wanted to retain elements from the game for fans. The biggest character change was to Luka, whom Kizaki described as the film's focal character, although his planned prominence was toned down for the final release. Due to the short runtime, many of the game's outlandish elements had to be dropped, resulting in a more "stoic" tone. While there was a prolonged brainstorming session with lots of comedic scene suggestions, the final product could only include the minimum of drama and story. By the end of production, Kizaki described himself as being in tears from the stress, adding a line for Cereza to express his feelings within the film.

While the basic story and game events were retained, Kizaki wanted to create scenes that were "unique" to animation, striving to make the female characters more spectacular. Reproducing the character designs in animated form was difficult due to their original high level of detail, with the final look being a compromise between detail and silhouette done with Shimazaki's oversight. Kizaki wanted Bayonetta to be sexy without being vulgar, with one scene showing her taking a bath: Kamiya recalled there being contension over the scene, while other staff wholeheartedly supported its inclusion. Kizaki personally choreographed the fights between Bayonetta and Jeanne, wanting their combat to be both impactful and graceful. He originally bought a demonstration DVD on capoeira to reference the leg movements, but ended up not using it.

For close-ups of angels and weapons, 3D CGI was used, with traditional animation limited to the human characters. Bayonetta was the most challenging character to animate due to her height, build, and accessories. The 3D CGI modelling was handled by IKIF+, with Patricia Hishikawa as director as CG director. A different unnamed company was originally set to create the CG but dropped out due to "unforeseen circumstances". Hishikawa was made CG director as she had worked with Gonzo on earlier bonus feature projects. Including core staff and freelance workers, the CG elements were done by a team of fifteen people, with their total work covering 151 cuts ranging from animation guides to full CG renders.

=== Voice cast ===
The original game did not have a Japanese dub, but for its port to the Wii U, it was decided to record one due to fan demand. As the anime was going into production alongside the port and Bayonetta 2, PlatinumGames opted to see if the two projects could share a cast. The prospective actors' schedules allowed them to audition for both the game and anime. According to Kizaki, the casting was done with input from PlatinumGames, and focused on voices that was suit each character. The final voice cast ended up featuring a number of industry veterans. Tanaka had previously voiced Bayonetta in commercials for the game, and was excited to portray the character in a full-length feature. Sonozaki was a fan of the games, and enjoyed Jeanne as a character due to her uncertain morality. Recording for Bloody Fate overlapped with Bayonetta 2, with both Tanaka and Sonozaki occasionally confusing which project they were recording for.

The English dub was produced by Jonathan Klein of Los Angeles–based New Generation Pictures. It was requested that as many video game cast members as possible reprise their roles. Most of the cast lived in Lost Angeles, but Taylor had relocated to the United Kingdom. While willing to reprise her role, she wanted to record her lines where she was, so Klein arranged a separate recording session at The Egg Recording Studio located at Shepperton Studios in Surrey, England. Other returning actors included DeLisle, Lowenthal, Fennoy and Albrecht. Enzo's original English actor Chick Vennera had retired from the industry, with Kassir replacing him.

Since the English cast were uncredited in the original game release, Klein had trouble tracking some of the actors down, particularly Jillian. While Klein thought they would need to recast the role, Taylor put Klein in contact with Jillian during their recording session. Deborah Crane adapted the script, which Klein said needed to reintroduce elements from the game dialogue that were lost in the original translation to Japanese. He also wanted to emulate Kris Zimmerman's original voice direction for the game while keeping the story understandable to viewers unfamiliar with the game. Due to scheduling issues, voice recording for Bloody Fate was spread between May and June 2014.

=== Release ===
Bloody Fate was announced in September 2013, along with its release schedule. Bloody Fate was initially screened at the Tokyo International Film Festival in October 2013, and then given a two-week limited theatrical release beginning on November 23, 2013. Sawashiro cosplayed as Bayonetta at multiple events related to the film. A promotional manga adaptation illustrated by Mizuki Sakakibara was published in two parts in Kodansha's Bessatsu Shōnen Magazine on November 9, 2013, and December 9, 2013, respectively. The film was released in Japan on Blu-ray and DVD on February 14, 2014. Alongside the standard editions, a special Blu-ray edition was released that included an artbook and soundtrack CD.

In North America, Bloody Fate was licensed by Funimation. It was released in North America for DVD and Blu-ray on October 21, 2014. In the United Kingdom, Manga Entertainment released the film on November 24 as both a DVD and a collector's edition Blu-ray release. The film was licensed in Austrlia by Madman Entertainment, releasing for DVD and Blu-ray on November 26. It was also added to streaming service Crunchyroll in 2017.

== Reception ==
The theatrical release of Bloody Fate was described by Japanese website Animate Times as "a huge hit". During its first week on sale in Japan, the DVD and Blu-ray release reached 24th place in the charts, selling 269 copies.

Multiple reviewers highlighted Bloody Fate as a good adaptation of the game. Kotaku's Richard Eisenbeis positively highlighted the changes made from the game as making the film a more successful adaptation than others of the time, while Nick Creamer of Anime News Network felt that the film "offers a fair enough riff for fans of the franchise", but did not stand out as its own project. Jordan Farley of SFX called it the best video game adaptation he had seen, but felt viewers who were not fans of the game "might struggle to see the appeal". Jonathan Clements and Helen McCarthy, writing in The Anime Encyclopedia: A Century of Japanese Animation, felt the anime succeeded in delivering a condensed and satisfying version of the story for fans of the game.

The combat visuals were met with general praise, though other parts of the animation were criticised. Farley gave general praise to the bombastic action and "bubblegum pop" soundtrack. Commenting on the visuals and fight scenes, Clelemts and McCarthy found them impressive, though not as spectacular as Gonzo's earlier work, and described combat sequences as "fast-paced and largely well-animated". Eisenbeis positively compared the film's animation to titles from the 90s to early 2000s, praising the fight scenes but noting a lack of animated movement in other sequences beyond camera panning. Creamer called the lighting and camera work "excellent" and praised the art direction, but otherwise found the animation of poor quality.

Reactions to the story were mixed among journalists. Jordan felt Bloody Fate did an impressive job at streamlining the story into film form, while Eisenbeis found the streamlined plot more enjoyable than the game despite finding aspects of its fan service distracting. Clements and McCarthy described the story as "cliched, but tightly paced and enjoyable enough" with minimal character development, noting the ironic style of the fan service and throwback in style to 90s anime. Creamer felt the story was underwritten and having core faults due to its game origins, but praised Bayonetta's characterisation and Taylor's English performance as redeeming features.
