= The Faraway Paladin =

Japanese light novel series

- First light novel volume cover

最果てのパラディン (Saihate no Paradin)
- Genre: Fantasy, isekai
- Novel series
- Written by: Kanata Yanagino
- Published by: Shōsetsuka ni Narō
- Original run: May 2015 – present
- Light novel
- Written by: Kanata Yanagino
- Illustrated by: Kususaga Rin
- Published by: Overlap
- English publisher: NA: J-Novel Club
- Imprint: Overlap Bunko
- Original run: March 2016 – present
- Volumes: 4 (Note: Five light novels in total have been released including the second part of volume 3)
- Manga
- Written by: Kanata Yanagino
- Illustrated by: Mutsumi Okuhashi
- Published by: Overlap
- English publisher: NA: J-Novel Club
- Magazine: Comic Gardo
- Original run: September 25, 2017 – present
- Volumes: 15
- Anime television series
- Directed by: Yuu Nobuta (S1); Akira Iwanaga (S2)
- Written by: Tatsuya Takahashi
- Music by: Ryūichi Takada; Keigo Hoashi
- Studio: Children's Playground Entertainment (S1); OLM (S2); Sunrise Beyond (S2)
- Licensed by: Crunchyroll (streaming); SA/SEA: Medialink
- Original network: Tokyo MX, AT-X, BS NTV
- English network: SEA: Animax Asia
- Original run: October 9, 2021 – December 23, 2023
- Episodes: 24
- icon

The Faraway Paladin (最果てのパラディン, Saihate no Paradin) is a Japanese light novel series written by Kanata Yanagino and illustrated by Kususaga Rin. It began serialization online in May 2015 on the user-generated novel publishing website Shōsetsuka ni Narō. It was later acquired by Overlap, who have published four volumes since March 2016 under their Overlap Bunko imprint. A manga adaptation with art by Mutsumi Okuhashi has been serialized online via Overlap's Comic Gardo website since September 2017 and has been collected in fifteen tankōbon volumes. Both the light novel and manga are licensed in North America by J-Novel Club. An anime television series adaptation by Children's Playground Entertainment aired from October 2021 to January 2022. A second season by OLM and Sunrise Beyond aired from in October to December 2023.

== Plot ==
In a city of the dead, long since ruined and far from human civilization, lives a single human child. His name is Will, and he's being raised by three undead: the hearty skeletal warrior, Blood; the graceful mummified priestess, Mary; and the crotchety spectral sorcerer, Gus. The three pour love into the boy, and teach him all they know.

But one day, Will starts to wonder: "Who am I?" Will must unravel the mysteries of this faraway dead man's land, and unearth the secret pasts of the undead. He must learn the love and mercy of the good gods, and the bigotry and madness of the bad. And when he knows it all, the boy will take his first step on the path to becoming a paladin.

"I promised you. It's gonna take a while, but I'll tell you everything. This is the story of the deaths of many heroes. It's the story of how we died, and it's the reason you grew up here."

== Characters ==
William G. Maryblood (ウィリアム・G・マリーブラッド, Wiriamu G Marīburaddo) / Will (ウィル, Wiru)
Voiced by: Maki Kawase (young), Shōya Chiba (adult) (Japanese); Erica Mendez (young), Chris Hackney (adult) (English)
William is a human boy reincarnated from Earth, retaining memories of his previous life while living in the city of the dead. He was raised by Mary and Blood, while Gus teaches him magic. Eventually after he becomes of age, he learns of the truth about the God of the Undead Stagnate, whose echo he confronts and defeats with the help of his newly formed contract with Gracefeel, the Goddess of Light.
Blood (ブラッド, Buraddo)
Voiced by: Katsuyuki Konishi (Japanese); Bill Butts (English)
Blood is a skeletal warrior, and Will's foster father as well as his combat instructor. As a human, he was a worshipper of Blaze, the god of fire and technology.
Mary (マリー, Marī)
Voiced by: Yui Horie (Japanese); Veronica Taylor (English)
A mummified priestess and Will's foster mother. She guided him about essential day-to-day tasks. She often serves him bread which Will finds out later on was received through prayer, and eating it is an act of communion. Mary had vowed to live according to the will of Mater the earth-mother, but had to make a contract with Stagnate the god of the undead in order to continue their existence in order to guard the seal of the Demon High King who Blood, Mary, and Gus failed to kill. Because of this betrayal, Mary catches fire every time she prays to Mater.
Augustus (オーガスタス, Ōgasutasu) / Gus (ガス, Gasu)
Voiced by: Nobuo Tobita (Japanese); Kirk Thornton (English)
Gus is a spectral sorcerer who is Will's foster grandfather as well as his teacher in sorcery and economics. He is an irascible old man who didn't like getting bound, so his vows were to Whirl, the God of Wind, to live his life the way he chose and to enjoy it.
Meneldor (メネルドール, Menerudōru) / Menel (メネル, Meneru)
Voiced by: Ayumu Murase (Japanese); Griffin Puatu (English)
A male half-elf archer that Will meets on the road after leaving home. While gruff and reluctant owing to previous bad experiences, he eventually comes to accept William as the first real friend he's had in his life.
Gracefeel (グレイスフィール, Gureisufīru)
Voiced by: Aoi Yūki (Japanese); Veronica Taylor (English)
The goddess to whom Will has devoted himself. She is the daughter of the gods Mater (goddess of the earth and child-rearing) and Volt (god of justice and lightning). Gracefeel is responsible for guiding the souls of the dead back into the cycle of rebirth by using her lantern to light their way. With her influence greatly diminished among the people in the other world, Will tries to act in her interest in order to spread her faith once again. He later confesses to Gracefeel that she has become the love of his life; an admission that the goddess responds to with a gentle, but not entirely reluctant rebuff.
Stagnate (スタグネイト, Sutaguneito)
Voiced by: Hiroki Takahashi
The deity of the Undead whom Blood, Mary, and Gus made a contract to. She is the eldest daughter of Mater and Volt, and Gracefeel's older sister. Although she is female, her echo assumes a male form.
Tonio (トニオ)
Voiced by: Kōji Yusa
A traveling salesman that Will meets and befriends.
Robina Goodfellow (ロビィナ・グッドフェロー, Robiina Guddoferō) / Bee (ビィ, Bii)
Voiced by: Eri Suzuki (Japanese); Cristina Valenzuela (English)
A halfling bard. She tells tales, sings, and in the anime, she plays a three-stringed rebec.
Ethelbald Rex Southmark (エセルバルド・レックス・サウスマーク, Eserubarudo Rekkusu Sausumāku)
Voiced by: Atsushi Tamaru
The crown prince of the Southmark kingdom and ruler of the city of Whitesails.
Bart Bagley (バート・バグリー, Bāto Bagurī)
Voiced by: Minoru Inaba
A bishop who is in charge of the temple in Whitesails and is a rather rude but caring character. He'll only perform full ceremonies at churches, finding it a waste to do so for informal reasons; since it's exhausting in the long run.
Anna (アンナ, Anna)
Voiced by: Keiko Watanabe
A novice priestess at the Whitesails temple, and Bishop Bagley's adopted daughter. She later becomes Reystov's wife.
Reystov (レイストフ, Reisutofu)
Voiced by: Kenji Nomura
An adventurer that Will hires while in Whitesails. Originally a member of a mountain tribe in a region known as Volt's Stove, he became a warrior to avenge his family after they were massacred by a neighbor village, but later gave up on this revenge quest and became a renowned adventuring warrior.
Vindalfr (ヴィンダールヴ, Vindāruvu) / Al (ルゥ, Rū)
Voiced by: Gō Shinomiya
A young dwarf who is a descendant and heir of Aurvangr, the last king of the dwarven realm of the Iron Mountains before its fall to the demon monster hordes. Although kind and considerate, he has become introverted and deadly shy due to the pressure of the expectations set on him by his fellow dwarves. After William re-encourages him, he becomes the Paladin's squire and travelling companion.
Gelrays (ゲルレイズ, Gerureizu)
Voiced by: Kenichirou Matsuda

== Media ==
=== Light novels ===
The series is written by Kanata Yanagino and illustrated by Kususaga Rin. It began serialization online in May 2015 on the user-generated novel publishing website Shōsetsuka ni Narō. It was later acquired by Overlap, who has published four volumes since March 2016 under their Overlap Bunko imprint. J-Novel Club licensed the series for English publication.

No.	Title	Original release date	English release date
1	The Boy in the City of the Dead 死者の街の少年	March 25, 2016; 978-4-86554-104-5	February 2, 2017 (digital); April 19, 2022 (print); 978-1-71832-390-2
2	The Archer of Beast Woods 獣の森の射手	July 25, 2016; 978-4-86554-137-3	April 27, 2017 (digital); May 24, 2022 (print); 978-1-71832-391-9
3.1	(Primus) The Lord of the Rust Mountains 〈上〉鉄錆の山の王	December 25, 2016; 978-4-86554-177-9	July 27, 2017 (digital); May 24, 2022 (print); 978-1-71832-392-6
3.2	(Secundus) The Lord of the Rust Mountains 〈下〉鉄錆の山の王	December 25, 2016; 978-4-86554-176-2	October 13, 2017 (digital); June 7, 2022 (print); 978-1-71832-393-3
4	The Torch Port Ensemble 灯火の港の群像	September 25, 2017; 978-4-86554-256-1	April 9, 2018 (digital); August 16, 2022 (print); 978-1-71832-394-0

=== Manga ===
A manga adaptation with art by Mutsumi Okuhashi has been serialized online via Overlap's Comic Gardo website since September 25, 2017. It has been collected in fifteen tankōbon volumes. J-Novel Club is also publishing the manga in English.

No.	Original release date	Original ISBN	English release date	English ISBN
1	March 25, 2018	978-4-86554-334-6	November 27, 2019 (digital); August 17, 2021 (omnibus)	978-1-71-834750-2 (digital); 978-1-71-835930-7 (omnibus)
2	October 25, 2018	978-4-86554-411-4	February 5, 2020 (digital); August 17, 2021 (omnibus)	978-1-71-834751-9 (digital); 978-1-71-835930-7 (omnibus)
3	April 25, 2019	978-4-86554-486-2	May 6, 2020 (digital); March 15, 2022 (omnibus)	978-1-71-834752-6 (digital); 978-1-71-835931-4 (omnibus)
4	October 25, 2019	978-4-86554-565-4	February 24, 2021 (digital); March 15, 2022 (omnibus)	978-1-71-834753-3 (digital); 978-1-71-835931-4 (omnibus)
5	May 25, 2020	978-4-86554-671-2	June 16, 2021 (digital); July 19, 2022 (omnibus)	978-1-71-834754-0 (digital); 978-1-71-835932-1 (omnibus)
6	November 25, 2020	978-4-86554-795-5	September 1, 2021 (digital); July 19, 2022 (omnibus)	978-1-71-834755-7 (digital); 978-1-71-835932-1 (omnibus)
7	April 25, 2021	978-4-86554-899-0	December 15, 2021 (digital); October 4, 2022 (omnibus)	978-1-71-834756-4 (digital); 978-1-71-835933-8 (omnibus)
8	September 25, 2021	978-4-8240-0010-1	March 16, 2022 (digital); October 4, 2022 (omnibus)	978-1-71-834757-1 (digital); 978-1-71-835933-8 (omnibus)
9	March 25, 2022	978-4-8240-0140-5	February 8, 2023 (digital); May 14, 2024 (omnibus)	978-1-71-834758-8 (digital); 978-1-71-835934-5 (omnibus)
10	October 25, 2022	978-4-8240-0321-8	August 16, 2023 (digital); May 14, 2024 (omnibus)	978-1-71-834759-5 (digital); 978-1-71-835934-5 (omnibus)
11	April 25, 2023	978-4-8240-0482-6	January 3, 2024 (digital); July 15, 2025 (omnibus)	978-1-71-834760-1 (digital); 978-1-71-835935-2 (omnibus)
12	September 25, 2023	978-4-8240-0621-9	August 14, 2024 (digital); July 15, 2025 (omnibus)	978-1-71-834761-8 (digital); 978-1-71-835935-2 (omnibus)
13	March 25, 2024	978-4-8240-0781-0	November 6, 2024 (digital); July 15, 2025 (omnibus)	978-1-71-834762-5 (digital); 978-1-71-835935-2 (omnibus)
14	May 25, 2025	978-4-8240-1203-6	December 10, 2025 (digital)	978-1-71-834763-2
15	May 20, 2026	978-4-8240-1657-7	—	—

=== Anime ===
An anime television series adaptation was announced on April 17, 2021. The series is animated by Children's Playground Entertainment and directed by Yuu Nobuta, with Tatsuya Takahashi overseeing the series' scripts, Koji Haneda designing the characters, and Ryūichi Takada and Keigo Hoashi from MONACA composing the music. It aired on Tokyo MX, AT-X, and BS NTV from October 9, 2021, to January 3, 2022. The opening theme is "The Sacred Torch" performed by H-el-ical//, while the ending theme is "Shirushibi" (標火; "Mark of Fire") performed by Nagi Yanagi. Crunchyroll streamed the series outside of Asia and Oceania (excluding Australia and Zealand), while Medialink licensed the series in South Asia, Southeast Asia, and the rest of Oceania, and co-licensed with Disney+ through Star content hub in Taiwan, Hong Kong and selected Southeast Asia countries. On October 28, 2021, Crunchyroll announced the series will receive an English dub, which premiered on November 27, 2021.

On December 25, 2021, a second season was announced to be in production. Titled The Faraway Paladin: The Lord of Rust Mountain, it will be produced by OLM and Sunrise Beyond, with Akira Iwanaga directing the season, and Tatsuya Arai designing the characters alongside Koji Haneda. It aired from October 7 to December 23, 2023. The opening theme is "Meika" (命火; "Fire of Life") performed by Nagi Yanagi, while the ending theme is "Puzzle" (パズル) performed by Kotoko. On October 20, 2023, Crunchyroll announced that the second season will begin airing its dub the following day.
