= The Foolish Angel Dances with the Devil =

Japanese manga series

- First tankōbon volume cover

愚かな天使は悪魔と踊る (Oroka na Tenshi wa Akuma to Odoru)
- Genre: Romantic comedy
- Manga
- Written by: Sawayoshi Azuma
- Published by: ASCII Media Works
- Imprint: Dengeki Comics Next
- Magazine: Dengeki Maoh
- Original run: June 27, 2016 – present
- Volumes: 23
- Manga

Midara na Sotai wa Sei ni Mezameru
- Written by: Sawayoshi Azuma
- Illustrated by: Suimin
- Published by: ASCII Media Works
- Imprint: Dengeki Comics Next
- Magazine: Dengeki Maoh
- Original run: November 26, 2022 – March 27, 2024
- Volumes: 2
- Anime television series
- Directed by: Itsuro Kawasaki
- Produced by: List: Naoki Yoshioka; Yukari Kuwayama; Aya Iizuka; Taketo Oonagi; Hatsuo Nara; Chiho Shibayama; Akihiro Sotokawa; Ken Yagou
- Written by: Itsuro Kawasaki
- Music by: Takurō Iga
- Studio: Children's Playground Entertainment (Note: Production assistance (制作協力) for all episodes provided by Gaina.)
- Licensed by: Crunchyroll; SA/SEA: Medialink
- Original network: TV Tokyo, TVO, AT-X, BS TV Tokyo, QAB
- English network: SEA: Animax Asia
- Original run: January 9, 2024 – March 26, 2024
- Episodes: 12
- icon

The Foolish Angel Dances with the Devil (愚かな天使は悪魔と踊る, Oroka na Tenshi wa Akuma to Odoru) is a Japanese manga series written and illustrated by Sawayoshi Azuma. It has been serialized in ASCII Media Works' seinen manga magazine Dengeki Maoh since June 2016, with its chapters collected into 23 tankōbon volumes as of May 2026. An anime television series adaptation produced by Children's Playground Entertainment aired from January to March 2024.

== Plot ==
Heaven and Hell are at war, with Hell at a disadvantage. The demon Masatora Akutsu goes to Earth undercover as a student planning to recruit charismatic humans to bolster the ranks and raise the morale of Hell. There, he immediately falls in love at first sight with the beautiful Lily Amane and attempts to recruit her. However, she reveals herself to be an arrogant, undercover angel who hunts demons. She defeats him and spares his life, then puts a collar on him that forces him to obey her. While he plots to break free, she plots to use him as a tool to reform Heaven, though as the story progresses, they realize their feelings for each other only grow stronger, much to Lily's embarrassment and frustration.

== Characters ==
Masatora Akutsu (阿久津 雅虎, Akutsu Masatora)
Voiced by: Taku Yashiro (voice comic), Yuma Uchida (anime) (Japanese); Brandon Acosta (English)
Lily Amane (天音 リリー, Amane Rirī)
Voiced by: Kaede Hondo (voice comic), Ayane Sakura (anime) (Japanese); Lindsay Sheppard (English)
Yūya Tanigawa (谷川 裕也, Tanigawa Yūya)
Voiced by: Shūichirō Umeda (Japanese); Tristan Bonner (English)
Kensaku Hirota (広田 健作, Hirota Kensaku)
Voiced by: Shun'ichi Toki (Japanese); Kyle Igneczi (English)
Yūka Tanahashi (棚橋 夕香, Tanahashi Yūka)
Voiced by: Nao Tōyama (Japanese); Madeleine Morris (English)
Liz (リズ, Rizu)
Voiced by: Rie Kugimiya (Japanese); Nia Celeste (English)
Shiromura (城村)
Voiced by: Kazuhiro Yamaji (Japanese); Marcus Stimac (English)
Joe (ジョー, Jō)
Voiced by: Masako Nozawa
Chum (チャム, Chamu)
Voiced by: Mayumi Tanaka
Lilia (リーリヤ, Rīriya)
Voiced by: Kaori Ishihara
Zwei (ツヴァイ, Tsuvai)
Voiced by: Ryōtarō Okiayu (Japanese); Gerard Caster (English)

== Media ==
=== Manga ===
Written and illustrated by Sawayoshi Azuma, The Foolish Angel Dances with the Devil began serialization in ASCII Media Works' Dengeki Maoh magazine on June 27, 2016. As of May 2026, 23 tankōbon volumes have been released.

A spin-off series illustrated by Suimin, titled Midara na Sotai wa Sei ni Mezameru, was serialized in Dengeki Maoh from November 26, 2022, to March 27, 2024.

==== Volumes ====
No.	Japanese release date	Japanese ISBN
1	December 17, 2016	978-4-04-892510-5
2	March 27, 2017	978-4-04-892788-8
3	August 26, 2017	978-4-04-893308-7
4	March 27, 2018	978-4-04-893711-5
5	September 27, 2018	978-4-04-893988-1
6	February 26, 2019	978-4-04-912361-6
7	August 24, 2019	978-4-04-912651-8
8	January 27, 2020	978-4-04-912981-6
9	July 27, 2020	978-4-04-913297-7
10	January 27, 2021	978-4-04-913631-9
11	July 27, 2021	978-4-04-913897-9
12	November 27, 2021	978-4-04-914121-4
13	May 27, 2022	978-4-04-914428-4
14	October 31, 2022	978-4-04-914712-4
15	April 27, 2023	978-4-04-914991-3
16	October 26, 2023	978-4-04-915256-2
17	December 27, 2023	978-4-04-915430-6
18	January 26, 2024	978-4-04-915484-9
19	June 26, 2024	978-4-04-915796-3
20	January 27, 2025	978-4-04-916177-9
21	June 27, 2025	978-4-04-916530-2
22	November 27, 2025	978-4-04-916818-1
23	May 27, 2026	978-4-04-952224-2

==== Midara na Sotai wa Sei ni Mezameru ====
No.	Japanese release date	Japanese ISBN
1	October 26, 2023	978-4-04-915252-4
2	June 26, 2024	978-4-04-915796-3

=== Anime ===
An anime television series adaptation was announced in the June issue of Dengeki Maoh on April 26, 2023. It is produced by Children's Playground Entertainment in cooperation with Gaina, and written and directed by Itsuro Kawasaki, with character designs handled by Yūko Yahiro, and music composed by Takurō Iga. The series aired from January 9 to March 26, 2024, on TV Tokyo and other networks. (Note: TV Tokyo and TV Osaka list the series premiere on January 8, 2024 at 25:30, which is effectively January 9 at 1:30 a.m. JST.) The opening theme song is "Otowa" (オトワ), performed by Taiyō to Odore, Tsukiyo ni Utae, and the ending theme song is "Gift", performed by Kaori Ishihara. Crunchyroll is streaming the series outside of Asia. Medialink licensed the series in South, Southeast Asia and Oceania (except Australia and New Zealand) for streaming on the Ani-One Asia YouTube channel.

==== Episodes ====
No.	Title (Note: All English titles are taken from Crunchyroll.)	Directed by	Written by	Storyboarded by	Original release date
1	"The Foolish Angel and the Demon" (Note: "Dance with the devil")	Takahiro Tamano	Itsuro Kawasaki	Itsuro Kawasaki	January 9, 2024
2	"The Even More Foolish Angel and Demon" (Note: "Lalapalooza")	Takahiro Tamano	Itsuro Kawasaki	Itsuro Kawasaki	January 16, 2024
3	"The Still Foolish Angel and Demon" (Note: "Preparation")	Tetsuya Watanabe	Itsuro Kawasaki	Hiromitsu Kanazawa	January 23, 2024
4	"The Equally Foolish Angel and Demon" (Note: "Heat Limit")	Takahiro Tamano	Itsuro Kawasaki	Hiromitsu Kanazawa	January 30, 2024
5	"The Excited Foolish Angel and Demon" (Note: "Turning Point")	Nao Miyoshi	Itsuro Kawasaki	Itsuro Kawasaki	February 6, 2024
6	"The Panicked Foolish Angel and Demon" (Note: "Close your eyes")	JOL	Masaharu Amiya	Itsuro Kawasaki & Hiromitsu Kanazawa	February 13, 2024
7	"The Exposed Foolish Angel and Demon" (Note: "First aid")	Shigeta Kobayashi & Honoka Uehara	Masaharu Amiya	Hiromitsu Kanazawa	February 20, 2024
8	"The Misunderstanding Foolish Angel and Demon" (Note: "Absolutely not")	Takahiro Tamano	Itsuro Kawasaki	Itsuro Kawasaki	February 27, 2024
9	"The Happy Foolish Angel and Demon" (Note: "No absolutes")	Yū Nobuta	Masaharu Amiya	Itsuro Kawasaki	March 5, 2024
10	"The False Foolish Angel and Demon" (Note: "Dignity")	Dali Chen	Masaharu Amiya	Hiromitsu Kanazawa	March 12, 2024 (Note: This episode aired at 1:40 a.m. JST, 10 minutes after the original air time on TV Tokyo.)
11	"The Foolish Angel and Demon Spread Their Wings" (Note: "Thanks")	Takahiro Tamano	Itsuro Kawasaki	Itsuro Kawasaki	March 19, 2024 (Note: This episode aired at 2:00 a.m. JST, 30 minutes after the original air time on TV Tokyo.)
12	"The Foolish Angel and Demon to the End" (Note: "to you.")	Itsuro Kawasaki	Itsuro Kawasaki	Itsuro Kawasaki	March 26, 2024

== Notes ==
=== Alternative titles ===
The official website of the anime uses different English titles for each episode compared to Crunchyroll, which are indicated here as the "Alternative titles".
