= Shun'ichi Toki =

Japanese voice actor and singer

- 土岐 隼一
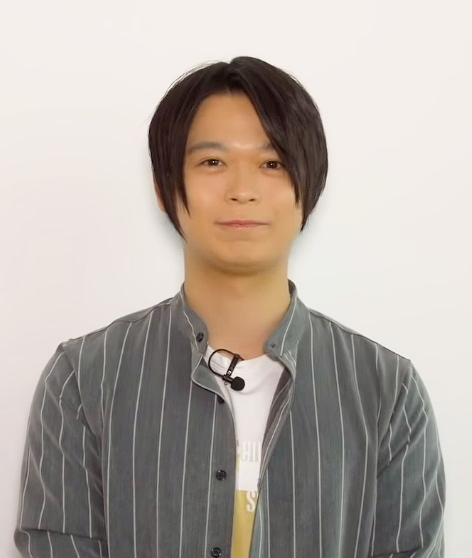
- Toki in 2018
- Born: May 7, 1989 (age 37); Tokyo, Japan
- Occupations: Voice actor and singer
- Years active: 2013–present
- Agent: WITH LINE
- Notable credits: Monster Girl Doctor as Glenn Litbeit; TsukiPro the Animation as Kōki Etō (Growth); Midnight Occult Civil Servants as Huehuecóyotl; Our Last Crusade or the Rise of a New World as Jhin Syulargun; Tokyo Revengers as Kazutora Hanemiya; Genshin Impact as Freminet; Hatsune Miku: Colorful Stage! as Rui Kamishiro
- Height: 172 cm (5 ft 8 in)
- Website: tokishunichi.com

Shun'ichi Toki (土岐 隼一, Toki Shun'ichi; born May 7, 1989) is a Japanese voice actor and singer from Tokyo, Japan affiliated with With Line.

== Biography ==
=== Personal life ===
Toki grew up in a family that was interested in music, especially his father, who was one of his earliest influences. He would take him to a bar where he could sing, which is where he realized his love for singing and music. As well, he played music from several foreign artists; as such, Toki grew up listening to music from around the world, which exposed him to the English language at an early age. Some of this influence can be heard in Toki's mini-album "True Gazer", which was released in September 2020 and was inspired by music from the 1960s and 1970s. It also inspired his 2021 True Gazer Reading Live event, in which he played a character that could time travel to the time where his parents were teenagers. In certain scenes, he performed songs from "True Gazer" that fit the scenarios of the story.

Though Toki aspired to become a voice actor when he was a child, having enjoyed anime, manga, and video games since he was young, he never took it further until after he graduated from university. While in university, he occasionally helped one of his upperclassmen with their acting troupe, which helped him realize that he enjoyed acting. However, he did not enjoy performing in front of people, so he decided to become a voice actor so he would not have to act in front of others.

Before becoming a voice actor, he trained at a vocal school for aspiring voice actors, as well as AMG (Amusement Media Gakuin) for around two years, before making his official debut and being signed to his current agency.

=== Career ===
He is affiliated with voice actor talent agency WITH LINE. He debuted as a voice actor in 2013, at the age of 24.

At the beginning of his career, he did not get many roles or major roles, but voiced background characters in anime such as Uta no Prince-sama. One of his first big roles was Growth's leader Eto Koki in the Tsukipro franchise (SQ/ALIVE series), which allowed him to use one of his strongest points as a voice actor; his singing voice.

His debut single, The Promised Overture (約束のOverture, Yakusoku no Overture), which was released on May 15, 2019, was the ending theme of Midnight Occult Civil Servants. The song was inspired by Latin American pop music to fit the character he portrayed in the anime. It was meant to be a catchy tune that could easily be played on the radio and something that was memorable for an anime ending theme.

=== Radio ===
Toki hosts two radio programs; Café Tokinowa (喫茶トキノワ, Kissa Tokinowa), which debuted in 2016, and Time With You, which debuted in May 2019 in honor of him becoming a solo artist and was bought by Pony Canyon, the record label he is signed with.

== Filmography ==
=== Anime ===
2016

- Yuri!!! on Ice – Leo de la Iglesia

2017

- The Idolmaster SideM – Kei Tsuzuki
- TsukiPro the Animation – Kōki Etō (Growth)

2018

- Kakuriyo: Bed and Breakfast for Spirits – Ginji

2019

- Demon Slayer: Kimetsu no Yaiba – Kiyoshi
- Midnight Occult Civil Servants – Huehuecóyotl
- Welcome to Demon School! Iruma-kun (Season 1) – Allocer Schneider

2020

- Toilet-Bound Hanako-kun – Akane Aoi
- A3! – Yuki Rurikawa
- Monster Girl Doctor – Glenn Leitbeit
- Our Last Crusade or the Rise of a New World – Jhin Syulargun

2021

- WAVE!! Surfing Yappe!! (TV) – Naoya Kido
- Skate-Leading Stars – Masatsugu Ajikata
- Welcome to Demon School! Iruma-kun (Season 2) – Allocer Schneider
- Tokyo Revengers – Kazutora Hanemiya
- Fire From My Fingertips 2: My Lover is a Firefighter – Rei Hidaka
- The Vampire Dies in No Time – Fukuma
- Taisho Otome Fairy Tale – Hakaru Shiratori

2022

- Miss Kuroitsu from the Monster Development Department – Cannon Thunderbird
- Salaryman's Club – Yuho Mashiba
- Requiem of the Rose King – Sir Richard Grey
- Lucifer and the Biscuit Hammer – Tarō Kusakabe
- Shine On! Bakumatsu Bad Boys! – Sakuya
- Shoot! Goal to the Future – Subaru Kurokawa

2023

- Ningen Fushin: Adventurers Who Don't Believe in Humanity Will Save the World – Zem
- Flaglia – Silver
- Hell's Paradise: Jigokuraku – Yamada Asaemon Kishou
- The Legendary Hero Is Dead! – Touka Scott, Sion Bladan
- Summoned to Another World for a Second Time – Setsu
- Why Raeliana Ended Up at the Duke's Mansion – Keith Westernberg
- Paradox Live the Animation – Hokusai Masaki

2024

- 7th Time Loop: The Villainess Enjoys a Carefree Life Married to Her Worst Enemy! – Oliver Laurents Friedheim
- The Weakest Tamer Began a Journey to Pick Up Trash – Tort/Marma
- Delusional Monthly Magazine – Gorō Satō
- The Foolish Angel Dances with the Devil – Kensaku Hirota
- The Unwanted Undead Adventurer – Isaac Hart
- Vampire Dormitory – Ruka Saotome
- I Was Reincarnated as the 7th Prince so I Can Take My Time Perfecting My Magical Ability – Babylon
- The Do-Over Damsel Conquers the Dragon Emperor – Gerard
- The Healer Who Was Banished From His Party, Is, in Fact, the Strongest – Margulus
- Blue Lock vs. U-20 Japan – Teppei Neru
- 18TRIP – Yuzuriha Kotonojo

2025

- I Want to Escape from Princess Lessons – Lyle
- Promise of Wizard – Rutile
- Honey Lemon Soda – Tomoya Takamine
- Toilet-Bound Hanako-kun Season 2 – Akane Aoi
- Mashin Creator Wataru – Mygah
- The Gorilla God's Go-To Girl – Shin Kuvare
- #Compass 2.0: Combat Providence Analysis System – Morita
- Reincarnated as a Neglected Noble: Raising My Baby Brother with Memories from My Past Life – Romanov
- The Dark History of the Reincarnated Villainess – Yomi Blacksarana
- Tougen Anki – Mikado Momodera

2026

- Sentenced to Be a Hero – Venetim Leopool
- The Daily Life of a Part-time Torturer – Cero
- Hell Teacher: Jigoku Sensei Nube - Meisuke Nueno (young)
- Dark Moon: The Blood Altar – Shion
- Reincarnated as a Dragon Hatchling – Ilusia
- Oh Boy, Was I Wrong About Her – Hayato Kirishima
- Though I Am an Inept Villainess – Kou Keishou
- Overgeared – Faker
- A Tale of the Secret Saint – Enoch

2027

- The Final-Boss Prince Is Somehow Obsessed with the Chubby Villainess: Reincarnated Me – Lewis

=== Films ===
2020

- WAVE!! Surfing Yappe!! – Naoya Kido
- Kono Sekai no Tanoshimikata: Secret Story Film – Koichiro Someya

2022

- Toku Touken Ranbu: Hanamaru ~Setsugetsuka~ – Matsui Gou

2025

- Colorful Stage! The Movie: A Miku Who Can't Sing – Rui Kamishiro

=== Games ===
2013

- Fairy Fencer F – minor character

2014

- The Idolmaster SideM – Kei Tsuzuki

2015

- Granblue Fantasy – Joel

2016

- Mary Skelter: Nightmares – Hitsuka

2017

- A3! – Yuki Rurikawa
- Anidol Colors – Yuito Toki
- First Lady Diaries – Hisoka Yukishiro
- Exile Election – Hakushuu Isumi

2018

- Piofiore no Banshou – Leo Cavagnis
- Ikemen Kakumei ◆ Alice to Koi no Mahou – Mousse Atlas
- Tsumugu Logic – Tsukasa Tsukasa
- Mary Skelter 2 – Hitsuka
- DREAM!ing – Chizuru Maki

2019

- Hero's Park – Halet / Manabu Yakushiji
- Mahoutsukai no Yakusoku – Rutile
- Touken Ranbu – Matsui Goi
- Grimms Echoes – El

2020

- Project Sekai: Colorful Stage feat. Hatsune Miku – Rui Kamishiro
- Piofiore no Banshou -Episodio 1926– – Leo Cavagnis

2021

- Kimi wa Yukima ni Koinegau – Hibie & Hibina
- The Caligula Effect 2 – Machina
- Shuuen no Virche -Error:Salvation- – Dahut

2022

- Technoroid Unison Heart – Ruma

2023

- Genshin Impact – Freminet
- Reverse: 1999 – X
- Monster Strike – Kazutora Hanemiya

2025

- Tasokare Hotel -Tsubomi- – Yuran

2026

- Fatal Fury: City of the Wolves – Kim Jae Hoon

=== Multimedia Projects ===
2015

- TSUKIPRO – Koki Eto

2019

- Paradox Live – Hokusai Masaki
- Hana-Doll – Kaoru Kisaragi

2023

- Fragaria Memories – Romarriche
- Gray Sheep – NERU

2026

- STRANGE EDEN – Rin

== Discography ==
=== Mini-albums ===
Title	Album details	Tracklist
True Gazer	Released: September 16, 2020; Label: Pony Canyon	1. "True Gazer"; 2. "Adolescence"; 3. "Mr. Innocence"; 4. "Ashita no Arika"; 5. "Key"

=== EPs ===
Title	Details	Tracklist
Party Jacker	Released: November 6, 2019; Label: Pony Canyon	1. "Party Jacker"; 2. "Afterglow"; 3. "Time with You"; 4. "Party Jacker" (Instrumental); 5. "Afterglow" (Instrumental); 6. "Time with You" (Instrumental)

=== Singles ===
Title	Details	Tracklist
Yakusoku no Overture (約束のOverture)	Released: May 15, 2019; Label: Pony Canyon	1. "Yakusoku no Overture"; 2. "Bokura niwa Attayonaa"; 3. "Yakusoku no Overture" (Instrumental); 4. "Bokura niwa Attayonaa" (Instrumental)
SCIENCE	Released: February 21, 2024; Label: Pony Canyon	1. "SCIENCE"; 2. "roulette" 3. "SCIENCE" (Instrumental); 4. "roulette" (Instrumental)
