= Hatena Illusion =

Japanese light novel series

- First light novel volume cover

はてな☆イリュージョン (Hatena☆Iryūjon)
- Genre: Romantic comedy
- Light novel
- Written by: Tomohiro Matsu
- Illustrated by: Kentaro Yabuki
- Published by: Shueisha
- Imprint: Dash X Bunko
- Original run: November 21, 2014 – November 25, 2015
- Volumes: 4
- Manga
- Illustrated by: Pochi Edoya
- Published by: Shueisha
- Magazine: Niconico Seiga (Dash X Comic)
- Original run: November 27, 2018 – January 19, 2021
- Volumes: 4
- Light novel

Hatena Illusion R
- Written by: Tomohiro Matsu, StoryWorks
- Illustrated by: Kentaro Yabuki
- Published by: Shueisha
- Imprint: Dash X Bunko
- Original run: August 23, 2019 – present
- Volumes: 2
- Anime television series
- Directed by: Shin Matsuo
- Written by: Tatsuya Takahashi
- Music by: Kenichi Kuroda
- Studio: Children's Playground Entertainment
- Licensed by: Crunchyroll (Note: In North America through Crunchyroll, LLC (formerly known as Funimation).)
- Original network: BS NTV, MBS, Tokyo MX
- Original run: January 9, 2020 – June 3, 2020
- Episodes: 12
- icon

Hatena Illusion (はてな☆イリュージョン, Hatena☆Iryūjon) is a Japanese light novel series by Tomohiro Matsu, with illustrations by Kentaro Yabuki. A manga adaptation by Pochi Edoya was serialized online via Niconico Seiga website from November 2018 to January 2021. An anime television series adaptation by Children's Playground Entertainment aired from January to June 2020.

== Synopsis ==
Makoto Shiranui dreams of becoming a magician and arrives in Tokyo to become a student of the world-famous illusionist Mamoru Hoshisato, a friend of his family. At the station, he is robbed by a beautiful thief, and when he arrives at the teacher's mansion, it turns out that his childhood friend Kana, who happens to be the daughter of his future teacher, has changed a lot. And now they do not understand each other at all.

== Characters ==
Makoto Shiranui (不知火真, Shiranui Makoto)
Voiced by: Yoshitsugu Matsuoka (Japanese); Comona Lewin (English)
The series' protagonist and Kana's childhood friend. He aims to become a magician and moves to Tokyo to pursue that dream, but ends up serving the Hoshisato family.
Kana "Hatena" Hoshisato (星里果菜, Hoshisato Kana)
Voiced by: Aina Suzuki (Japanese); Skyler McIntosh (English)
Makoto's childhood friend who becomes a thief. She is nicknamed "Hatena", which is an alternate reading of her given name and means question mark, although she dislikes that nickname.
Yumemi Hoshisato (星里夢未, Hoshisato Yumemi)
Voiced by: Miyu Tomita (Japanese); Sarah Roach (English)
Emma Sakurai (桜井エマ, Sakurai Emma)
Voiced by: M.A.O (Japanese); Tabitha Ray (English)
Jeeves Wodehouse (ジーヴス・ウッドハウス, Jīvusu Uddohausu)
Voiced by: Takashi Matsuyama (Japanese); Ben Phillips (English)
Mamoru Hoshisato (星里衛, Hoshisato Mamoru)
Voiced by: Yoshimasa Hosoya (Japanese); Daman Mills (English)
Maeve Hoshisato (星里メイヴ, Hoshisato Maeve)
Voiced by: Yoshino Nanjō (Japanese); Brianna Roberts (English)
Mariah Grene (マライア・グレーネ, Maraia Gurēne)
Voiced by: Satomi Arai (Japanese); Amanda Gish (English)
Kokomi Kikyōin (桔梗院心美, Kikyōin Kokomi)
Voiced by: Sumire Uesaka (Japanese); Dani Chambers (English)

== Media ==
=== Light novel ===
Shueisha published four volumes of the light novel series under their Dash X Bunko imprint, with the latest volume published on November 25, 2015. The series is unfinished owing to the death of Tomohiro Matsu in May 2016. Shueisha later launched a new series, Hatena Illusion R, with the first volume being published on August 23, 2019.

==== Volume list ====
===== Hatena Illusion =====
No.	Release date	ISBN
1	November 21, 2014	978-4-08-631007-9
2	April 24, 2015	978-4-08-631038-3
3	August 25, 2015	978-4-08-631063-5
4	November 25, 2015	978-4-08-631082-6

===== Hatena Illusion R =====
No.	Release date	ISBN
R	August 23, 2019	978-4-08-631324-7
R2	February 21, 2020	978-4-08-631350-6

=== Manga ===
Pochi Edoya serialized a manga adaptation of the series in Niconico Seiga online website on November 27, 2018, to January 19, 2021. Shueisha published the first tankōbon volume on January 17, 2020.

No.	Release date	ISBN
1	January 17, 2020	978-4-08-891297-4
2	February 19, 2020	978-4-08-891525-8
3	June 19, 2020	978-4-08-891645-3
4	March 18, 2021	978-4-08-891861-7

=== Anime ===
In March 2017, an anime adaptation of Hatena Illusion was announced at AnimeJapan. The adaptation was later announced in 2019 to be a television series animated by Children's Playground Entertainment and directed by Shin Matsuo, with Tatsuya Takahashi handling series composition, Ruizu Nakano designing the characters, and Kenichi Kuroda composing the music. The series aired from January 9 to June 3, 2020, on BS NTV, MBS, and Tokyo MX. Liyuu performed the series' opening theme song "Magic Words", while Aina Suzuki performed the series' ending theme song "Hikari Iro no Uta" (ヒカリイロの歌). Funimation licensed the series for a SimulDub. Due to "various reasons", the twelfth and final episode was postponed from its April broadcast until June 3.
