= Bakumatsu Rock =

Japanese video game and media franchise

- Cover of the video game

幕末Rock
- Genre: Adventure, Rhythm game
- Video game
- Developer: Marvelous AQL
- Publisher: Marvelous AQL
- Platform: PlayStation Portable
- Released: JP: February 27, 2014
- Manga

Bakumatsu Rock -howling soul-
- Written by: Shinshu Ueda
- Published by: Ichijinsha
- Magazine: Monthly Comic Zero Sum
- Original run: May 2014 – September 2015
- Anime television series

Samurai Jam -Bakumatsu Rock-
- Directed by: Itsuro Kawasaki
- Written by: Mitsutaka Hirota
- Music by: Tomoki Kikuya
- Studio: Studio Deen
- Licensed by: NA: Sentai Filmworks; UK: Animatsu Entertainment
- Original network: Tokyo MX
- English network: SEA: Animax Asia
- Original run: July 2, 2014 – September 17, 2014
- Episodes: 12
- Video game

Bakumatsu Rock: Ultra Soul
- Developer: Marvelous AQL
- Publisher: Marvelous AQL
- Platform: PlayStation Portable; PlayStation Vita
- Released: JP: September 25, 2014

Bakumatsu Rock (Japanese: 幕末Rock) is a Japanese video game developed and published by Marvelous AQL. It was adapted into a manga series, Bakumatsu Rock -howling soul-, that began in May 2014 and into an anime television series, Samurai Jam -Bakumatsu Rock-, that aired on July 2, 2014 to September 17, 2014. The anime was streamed on Crunchyroll. Another game, Bakumatsu Rock: Ultra Soul, was released on September 25, 2014.

== Story ==
The story is set in the Bakumatsu era, at the end of the shoguns' rule over Japan in the middle of the 19th century. The Tokugawa shogunate uses the brainwashing Heaven's Songs by the top idols in Shinsengumi to subjugate the country and its people. In this Japan, writing or singing any songs besides the Heaven's Songs is a capital offense. Ryōma Sakamoto and the other rockers rise up and change the world with rock 'n' roll for freedom and justice.

== Characters ==
Sakamoto Ryōma (坂本 龍馬)
Voiced by: Kishō Taniyama
The lead singer and guitarist of the group, his dream is to become a famous rocker and spread rock throughout Japan. During the day, he works at the local pizzeria, "Albergo di Terada". The electric guitar he carries around was given to him by Shoin Yoshida, who believed that Ryōma possesses a "Peace Soul".
Takasugi Shinsaku (高杉 晋作)
Voiced by: Tatsuhisa Suzuki
One of Shoin's disciples, he plays bass guitar in the group. While he and Kogorō were on a search for their master, Shoin Yoshida, they met Ryōma and started a band. He is nicknamed "Cindy" by Ryōma. He is known for his sour face and unfriendly disposition.
Katsura Kogorō (桂 小五郎)
Voiced by: Showtaro Morikubo
One of Shoin's disciples, he plays drums in the group. While he and Shinsaku were on a search for their master, Shoin Yoshida, they met Ryōma and started a band. He is nicknamed "Sensei" by Ryōma. He is known as a patient, mature and knowledgeable person. His special skill is inventing.
Hijikata Toshizō (土方 歳三)
Voiced by: Toshiyuki Morikawa
A member of the Shinsengumi. He has served as both a director and a backup guitarist. He is known as a skilled swordsman. A proponent of "Heaven's Song".
Sōji Okita (沖田 総司)
Voiced by: Kensho Ono
The top member of the Shinsengumi. He plays both the guitar and the keyboard. While publicly a kind and charming idol, in private he thinks of his fans as "worthless creatures." A proponent of "Heaven's Song".
Naosuke Ii (井伊 直弼)
Voiced by: Hiroki Yasumoto
He has worked for the Tokugawa family for many generations, and currently serves Yoshinobu. His main goal is to collect all five "Peace Souls" to enhance his magical powers.
Yoshinobu Tokugawa (徳川 慶喜)
Voiced by: Mitsuki Saiga
The fifteenth head of the Tokugawa Shogunate. He was born with the talent of "Heaven's Song"
Kondō Isami (近藤 勇)
Voiced by: Keiji Fujiwara
Director of the Tokugawa Shogunate. In the past, he was in an idol band, but withdrew and is now supporting the Shinsengumi as a general producer. He is known as a big brother that everyone can rely on.

== Episode list ==
No.	Title	Original release date
1	"Peace Soul! Let's Rock!" "Pīsusoru! Rokkuyaruzeyo!" (Japanese: ピースソウル! ロックやるぜよ!)	July 2, 2014
2	"Top Idol! Rampage at a Concert!" "Toppuaidoru! Raibudeboreruzeyo!" (Japanese: トップアイドル! ライブで暴れるぜよ!)	July 9, 2014
3	"Passion! Let's Work!" "Passhon! Baitosuruzeyo!" (Japanese: パッション! バイトするぜよ!)	July 16, 2014
4	"Bath Concert! Let's Get Passionate Naked!" "Basuraibu! Hadakadepasshonzeyo!" (Japanese: バスライブ! 裸でパッションぜよ!)	July 23, 2014
5	"Peaceful! Heaven's Song is Wild!" "Pīsufuru! Hebenzusonguyabaizeyo!" (Japanese: ピースフル! ヘブンズソングヤバいぜよ)	July 30, 2014
6	"Royal Concert! Rocker's Hearts are Moved to Tears!" "Roiyarukonsēto! Shishinofugakokuseruzeyo!" (Japanese: ロイヤルコンサート! 志士の心が哭けるぜよ!)	August 6, 2014
7	"Rocker's! Let's Form a Band!" "Rokkā! Bandokumimuzeyo!" (Japanese: ロッカー! バンド組むぜよ!)	August 13, 2014
8	"Dark Cherries! Death to Rock" "Dākucherīzu! Rokkushisubeshi!" (Japanese: ダークチェリーズ! ロック死すべし!)	August 20, 2014
9	"Mask the Rocker! The Soul is Important!" "Masuku·de·Rokkā! Sourugadaijizeyo!" (Japanese: マスク・ザ・ロッカー! ソウルが大事ぜよ)	August 27, 2014
10	"Solo Debut! We Can't Play Together Anymore!" "Sorodebyū! Moūitoguchiniyarenee!" (Japanese: ソロデビュー! もう一緒にやれねえ!)	September 3, 2014
11	"Heaven's Song! Time for the Climax!" "Hebenzusong! Kuraimakkuzuzeyo!" (Japanese: ヘヴンズソング! クライマックスぜよ)	September 12, 2014
12	"Ultra Soul! The Dawn of Rock!" "Urutorasouru! Rokkunoyoakezeyo!" (Japanese: ウルトラソウル! ロックの夜明けぜよ!)	September 17, 2014

== Music ==
- OP: Jack by vistlip
- ED: Zetchō DAYBREAK (絶頂DAYBREAK) by Chō Tamashī Dan (Kishō Taniyama, Tatsuhisa Suzuki, Shōtarō Morikubo, Toshiyuki Morikawa & Kenshō Ono)
- Over Mirage (非常幻想（オーバーミラージュ）) by Toshiyuki Morikawa & Kenshō Ono
- Rolling Thunder by Kishō Taniyama, Tatsuhisa Suzuki, & Shōtarō Morikubo
- INTERSECT by Kishō Taniyama, Toshiyuki Morikawa, & Kenshō Ono
- REACTION by Tatsuhisa Suzuki
- Zankyō -feedback- (残響 -feedback-) by Kenshō Ono
- Hachinoji Distortion (ハチノジディストーション) by Shōtarō Morikubo

== Reception ==
On Anime News Network, Hope Chapman, Carl Kimlinger and Rebecca Silverman gave the first episode of the anime a rating of 2 out of 5 and Theron Martin gave it a rating of 3.5 out of 5.
