= Tsukiuta =

Japanese media franchise

- Key visual

ツキウタ。 (tsukiuta.)
- Audio drama
- Produced by: Movic
- Written by: Fujiwara, Jiku (character design)
- Original run: December 7, 2012 – present
- Anime television series

Tsukiuta. The Animation
- Directed by: Itsuro Kawasaki (#1–13); Yukio Nishimoto (#14–26)
- Produced by: Osamu Shimizu (#1–13); Kazuyoshi Ozawa (#1–13); Atsunori Yoshida (#1–13); Nao Katsurashima (#1–13); Tomoyo Kamiji (#1–13); Shōko Imaizumi (#1–13); Takuya Inagaki (#14–26); Shinya Ubukata (#14–26); Misaki Sugiura (#14–26)
- Written by: Itsuro Kawasaki (#1–13); Natsuko Takahashi (#14–26)
- Music by: Hiroyuki Kouzu
- Studio: Pierrot+ (#1–13); Children's Playground Entertainment (#14–26)
- Licensed by: NA: Funimation
- Original network: Tokyo MX, BS11
- Original run: July 6, 2016 – December 30, 2020
- Episodes: 26
- Manga

Tsukiuta. Tsubuyaki manga -Tsukitsui.-
- Written by: Fumi Nanao
- Published by: Libre Comics
- Published: November 5, 2016
- Volumes: 1
- Manga

Tsukiuta. The Animation
- Written by: Mero
- Published by: Ichijinsha
- Magazine: Zero-Sum
- Original run: October 2016 – August 25, 2017
- Video game

Tsukino Paradise (TsukiPara.)
- Developer: geechs
- Publisher: Bandai Namco Entertainment
- Genre: Rhythm game
- Platform: iOS, Android
- Released: April 26, 2017
- Video game

Tsukitomo. -Tsukiuta. 12 Memories-
- Developer: Netchubiyori
- Publisher: Bandai Namco Entertainment
- Genre: Adventure
- Platform: PlayStation Vita
- Released: June 1, 2017
- Manga

Tsukiuta. The Animation 2
- Written by: Aiko Kotori
- Published by: Ichijinsha
- Magazine: Zero-Sum
- Original run: October 28, 2020 – present
- Anime film

Rabbits Kingdom the Movie
- Directed by: Masayoshi Ozaki
- Written by: Ryūichirō Itsumi
- Studio: Studio Sign
- Released: June 14, 2024
- icon

Tsukiuta (Japanese: ツキウタ。; stylized Tsukiuta.) is a character CD series that started as a collaboration between Vocaloid producers and popular voice actors but expanded into a media franchise with its own animation, multiple stage plays, manga anthologies, video games, and merchandise.

== Main characters ==
The characters of Tsukiuta are split into four idol groups under the fictional Tsukino Talent Production. There are twelve men and twelve women, each representing a month of the year. Tsukino Talent Production also manages the fictional idol groups under TsukiPro.

The men are split into rival units named Six Gravity and Procellarum. The members of Six Gravity come from Eastern Japan, while the members of Procellarum come from Western Japan.

The women belong to the units Fluna and Seleas. They are goddesses from a different dimension, unknown to anyone on Earth.

=== Six Gravity ===
==== Shiwasu Kakeru (師走 駆, Shiwasu Kakeru) ====
Voiced by: Yūki Kaji / Composition by Satsuki ga Tenkomori

Month – December

Birthday – December 12

Stage Cast:

- Kiyama Ryu (former)
- Sawabe Neo (current)

===== Appearance =====
Kakeru is a fair-skinned young male with neck-length blond hair and orange eyes. He is currently the shortest among both Six Gravity and Procellarum's members. His theme color is gold.

===== Personality =====
Kakeru is portrayed as cheerful, energetic and hardworking. He is competitive, rarely becomes discouraged, and generally approaches his work with enthusiasm despite being prone to bad luck.

Kakeru carries a strong sense of pride and believes in self-reliance, as shown by how he chose to work part-time to support himself instead of relying on his parents' allowance since it was his choice to move out of his home.

Kakeru does feel uncomfortable when it comes to his height sometimes, especially due to him now being the shortest among the two groups. At some times, he feels as if his height makes him seem like a person who isn't very dependable, and, while he doesn't dislike it, he gets treated like a child.

===== History =====
Kakeru is the only child of Shiwasu Ayumu and Ayumu's unnamed wife, and it is heavily implied that he comes from an affluent family.

==== Mutsuki Hajime (睦月 始, Mutsuki Hajime) ====
Voiced by: Kohsuke Toriumi / Composition by Machigerita, Misato Murai (childhood)

Month – January

Birthday – January 8

Stage Cast:

- Menjo Kentaro (former)
- Agata Goki (current)

===== Appearance =====
Hajime is a tall, fair-skinned, well-built young male with neck-length black hair and purple eyes. In his initial setting, Hajime had a lock of hair highlighted purple. His theme color is violet.

===== Personality =====
Hajime has a commanding presence, making him stand out compared to other people. With his naturally high amount of charisma, he often ends up being the center of the group without realizing it. Many people hail him as if he were a "King" due to his appeal and because he is good at taking care of those around him. While he is a man of very few words, he can be quite blunt and, at times, sarcastic and severe, but well-meaning. He also dislikes doing things half-done or half-way.

Hajime is also physically strong, which often manifests in his famous "Iron Claw" technique, which makes him strong enough to crush an apple with his bare hands. He has also practiced the art of self-defense and has the strength to break a certain number of tiles.

Despite his repertoire of skills and intellect, as well as his family background, Hajime keeps himself grounded and does not let himself get carried away with what he has accomplished.

Surprisingly, he also has a childish side, usually manifesting when he and the senior members assemble. He can also sometimes be rather airheaded, making him the target of teasing by others.

He has soft spots for animals and people younger than him. He often helps them study by holding study sessions which receive the name "Iron Claw Cram School" because he's known to be strict with the ones he teaches and punish them with his infamous iron claws.

===== History =====
Hajime comes from the noble Mutsuki family. He has a history of running away from home during their family's New Year's celebrations. It was the same with their 2014 celebration.

He and Haru first spoke with each other sometime after they'd been assigned to the same class in their second year as junior high school students. Haru had been playing with others while Hajime had been taking a nap.

==== Kisaragi Koi (如月 恋, Kisaragi Koi) ====
Voiced by: Toshiki Masuda / Composition by Nijihara Peperon

Month – February

Birthday – February 14

Stage Cast:

- Yokoo Lui (former)
- Suzuki Yota (current)

===== Appearance =====
Koi is a fair-skinned young male with short bubblegum-pink hair and slightly darker pink eyes. The hairpins he regularly wears are gifts from his younger twin sister, Ai. While initially one of the shortest among the male idols, he has experienced the most height growth in the past few years. He is also the youngest among the members of Six Gravity and Procellarum, having made his debut at the age of 15.

His theme color is pink.

===== Personality =====
. Koi has been described as sociable, straightforward, and hardworking. Accounts of his personality characterize him as supportive toward people experiencing difficulties and as knowledgeable in several areas. His social and professional relationships have included connections with various individuals.

He resembles a big brother's role by looking out for everyone, despite being doted upon by those older than him. He plays the funny man role, and can throw sharp retorts, making him a reliable member of his unit.

According to his profile, while he may look like a player, he has a strong moral sense.

===== History =====
Koi is one of the twin children of his unnamed father and unnamed mother, a former goddess. His younger twin sister, Ai, is also a goddess candidate. However, both Koi and his father are not aware of the Moon Society and Mrs. Kisaragi and Ai's standing as former goddesses and goddess candidates, respectively.

==== Yayoi Haru (弥生 春, Yayoi Haru) ====
Voiced by: Tomoaki Maeno / Composition by Yuuyu

Month – March

Birthday – March 19

Stage Cast:

- Nakada Hiroki (former)
- Matsuda Gaku (former)
- Ota Yuji (current)

===== Appearance =====
Haru has collar-length, light sandy green hair, slightly parted bangs, and a natural ahoge. His eyes are lime green, with a mole under his left eye. He is the only idol in the series who wears glasses, although his eyesight isn't so bad that he needs to wear his glasses constantly.

===== Personality =====
Haru is described as a calm and gentle young man and is someone everyone relies on—practically a mother-type figure with a big heart on the level of a "holy mother" or the Virgin Mary. He is looked up to by those younger than him, and those older than him rely on him, making him the type who couldn't be hated by anyone. He is apparently weak at arguing and tends to avoid conflict.

He is also very intelligent and has earned himself the titles of "trivia king" and "Harupedia", although he has only beaten Hajime twice in academics.

===== History =====
He debuted during his third year of senior high school and is currently a university student.

==== Uduki Arata (卯月 新, Uzuki Arata) ====
Voiced by: Yoshimasa Hosoya / Composition by ChouchouP

Month – April

Birthday – April 28

Stage Cast:

- Yamazaki Taiki (Act 1–3)
- Takenaka Ryohei (Act 4–8)
- Nakajima Reiki (current)

===== Appearance =====
Arata has collar-length, greyish-black hair, and grey eyes. He tends to keep an expressionless face. He is said to resemble his mother.

===== Personality =====
Arata is a laid-back, unhurried person who takes things at his own pace, often compared to a cat in a sunny area. He tends to be someone who sits at either end of the spectrum when it comes to working; he can be quite difficult to handle once he loses his enthusiasm, but he displays an overwhelming ability to concentrate and talent when it comes to interests and goes all the way when having fun.

While his lack of expression makes him look unsociable and coldhearted, he does not seem to mind. He has also displayed a great love for strawberry-flavored milk on several occasions, such as when asked by Arata what kind of soup he'd prefer, he responded plainly with "Strawberry Milk."

===== History =====
He comes from a family of four, consisting of him, his parents, and Yuka, his sister, who is two years older than him.

He made his debut during his second year of senior high school.

==== Satsuki Aoi (皐月 葵, Satsuki Aoi) ====
Voiced by: Kenn / Composition by Nem

Month – May

Birthday – May 5

Stage Cast: Jonin Tatsuki

===== Appearance =====
Aoi has fine, soft hair that is platinum-blonde with a faint tawny shade, with two distinctive tufts of hair bent outward on the top of his head, reminiscent of wings, and sky-blue eyes. He has fair, smooth skin. One of his casual attires is a black t-shirt with a cerulean blue jacket and dark blue jeans.

He is often described as very handsome and pretty, a trait he shares with the rest of the Satsuki family, making them well known as the good-looking family in their neighborhood. He and his older brother, Chihiro, both resemble their father in particular. It is said that whenever he smiles, there is always a momentary flash of light.

His theme color is light blue or sky blue.

===== Personality =====
He is described as a refreshing person, to the point that he can be too refreshing. He is nicknamed 'Gravi's Prince' or the 'Refreshing Prince' by the rest of the members due to his princely charm. Very mature and level-headed, he, together with Yayoi Haru, look after and back up the rest of Six Gravity.

He is portrayed as diligent and serious, and has difficulty relaxing. He is also depicted as inexperienced in romantic situations.

Despite being adult-like on the surface, he also has a rather cute and childish side, which he originally only showed to his childhood friend, Uduki Arata, but is now more often revealing this side of his to the rest of Six Gravity's members. He also tends to become lonely sometimes. He spends most of his time with Arata, his best friend.

===== History =====
Aoi is the youngest son of the Satsuki family, a family well known in their neighborhood for being very good-looking. He was scouted together with his childhood friend, Arata, when they tried to return Kuroda based on the contact address on his collar. He made his debut during his second year of senior high school.

=== Procellarum ===
==== Minaduki Rui (水無月 涙, Minazuki Rui) ====
Voiced by: Shouta Aoi / Composition by Yuyoyuppe
Month – June
Birthday – June 16
Stage Cast: Sato Yusaku
Rui is innocent and naive, to the point that Shimotsuki Shun has (somewhat negatively) influenced his way of thinking. However, he can also do rather unexpected things while maintaining a straight face. He possesses a unique worldview, which makes him nonreactive to things such as scary stories. Rui possesses a natural talent for music, particularly the piano, and has participated in national and international competitions since childhood. However, following discord with his older brother, Rei, who did not possess the same music talent as Rui, as well as disagreements with his parents involving his musical career as a pianist, Rui has run away from home, was picked up by Fuduki Kai, and had been living with him until they were scouted. He was scouted due to Kai (who had been scouted while helping out with some people moving into the talent production's dorms) showing the talent company a picture of Rui, who had just woken up, looking out-of-focus, and said company encouraged Kai to bring Rui along to become an idol.

==== Fuduki Kai (文月 海, Fuzuki Kai) ====
Voiced by: Wataru Hatano / Composition by Hitoshizuku x Yama△
Month – July
Birthday – July 15
Stage Cast:
- Doi Kazumi (former)
- Hirai Yuki (current)
A member of Procellarum represents the month of July. Kai is most known for his liveliness and big heart, which make him popular and respected. Being the eldest son among six siblings, Kai has developed a natural 'big brother'-like personality and has a habit of patting everyone on the head. He is naturally welcoming and accepting, although according to Haduki You, he can end up pampering others too much, especially Procellarum's leader, Shimotsuki Shun. Kai is known for being a jack of all-trades as well as a very reliable person. Kai aims to become self-reliant, previously living off connections he has made through his part-time jobs and living on his own, prior to taking in Minaduki Rui, whom he treats as his own son and worries about often. Additionally, Kai enjoys physical activities and work, such as fishing and exploration.

==== Haduki You (葉月 陽, Hazuki Yō) ====
Voiced by: Tetsuya Kakihara / Composition by UtataP
Month – August
Birthday – August 13
Stage Cast:
- Kurita Manabu (former)
- Washio Shuto (current)
You is known to others as someone who puts women above men. With this, he is quite good with women and is popular among them. You is free-spirited, unrestrained, and laid-back. He can also be very vague, the kind of person who ends up toying with others and causing them trouble. However, while he appears to be flashy and troublesome, he possesses a strong sense of duty and a one-track mind, although according to him, he would rather die than show that side of him. He also possesses a unique worldview and sense of beauty. He and Nagatsuki Yoru were both childhood friends who got scouted together.

==== Nagatsuki You (長月 夜, Nagatsuki Yoru) ====
Voiced by: Takashi Kondō / Composition by John
Month – September
Birthday – September 7
Stage Cast:
- Tani Yoshiki (former)
- Akiba Yusuke (current)
Yoru is an idol of the unit Procellarum under Tsukino Talent Production. He is a 17-year-old male with dark brown hair and blue eyes. (initial settings) With a slender body and narrowed shoulders, his body fits in women's clothing better than in men's clothing. His personality is mature, sincere, and earnest. Yoru has a high level of femininity and is good at cooking, thanks to his mother. He received the title and name "Procellarum's Mother" as he is usually seen in the kitchen, preparing food for his fellow members as well as those of Six Gravity. He and Haduki You were both childhood friends who got scouted together.

==== Kannaduki Iku (神無月 郁, Kannazuki Iku) ====
Voiced by: Kenshō Ono / Composition by takamatt
Month – October
Birthday – October 21
Stage Cast:
- Sasa Tsubasa (former)
- Miyama Ryoki (former)
- Sato Tomohiro (current)
Iku is lively and athletic, preferring to be constantly in motion compared to staying still. He is the type who always looks forward and remains aware of those around him. He also exudes a natural aura of masculinity. Compared to the other idols, Iku comes from a comparatively normal family. He possesses a normal type of common sense, making him and Haduki You the ones in charge of throwing retorts at his fellow idols' antics. Due to being the only member who decided to keep participating in clubs as well as having to commute a lot, he ends up being very busy but manages his time professionally.

==== Shimotsuki Shun (霜月 隼, Shimotsuki Shun) ====
Voiced by: Ryōhei Kimura / Composition by Kikuo
Month – November
Birthday – November 24
Stage Cast:
- Tomotsune Yuuki (former)
- TAKA (CUBERS) (current)
The leader of Procellarum. A self-proclaimed 'Demon Lord' who leads the unit with a mysterious charisma, despite claiming his reluctance to work. His profound smile adds to his peculiar nature, but he is intelligent, able to memorize a book after only one reading. He has been shown to exhibit a variety of magical abilities, including ice magic. Shun is a big fan of Six Gravity's leader, Hajime Mutsuki, and holds the latter's fanclub card, entitled "Honorary Member No. 6." Being the only son of the prominent Shimotsuki family of Western Japan, he has grown up to be quite pampered and shows no motivation for work or manual labor. Part of the oldest pair with July's Fuduki Kai.

=== Fluna ===
==== Kurisu Hijiri (聖 クリス, Hijiri Kurisu) ====
Voiced by: Hisako Kanemoto / Composition by Satsuki ga Tenkomori
Month – December
Birthday – December 25
For better or worse, Hijiri Kurisu is like a pure little "princess". She is characterized by her outspoken and straightforward mannerisms; people tend to think she has a tough personality, but she is actually quite tearful and vulnerable and dislikes showing her weakness to those around her. She is a talented, hard worker who does not give up easily. She is renowned for making strong progress during joint projects and is very reliable, as she doesn't give in to useless detours and derailments. However, she is mostly idle and often goes missing, which makes her a lovable idiot. She is a positive, energetic, and dependable person. Ever since she was little, she has loved studying, researching, and inventing, which has led others to dub her the genius girl. She is the partner of Hina, who is an obedient, timid, and responsive girl. Kurisu loves to mess around with Hina. Her one-sided rival is Hanazono Yuki (the female representative of the month of January). She is also the owner of 'Divine Luck'.

==== Yuki Hanazono (花園 雪, Hanazono Yuki) ====
Voiced by: Asami Imai / Composition by Machigerita
Month – January
Birthday – January 22

==== Ai Kisaragi (如月 愛, Kisaragi Ai) ====
Voiced by: Mako / Composition by Nijihara Peperon
Month – February
Birthday – February 14

==== Hina Momosaki (桃崎 ひな, Momosaki Hina) ====
Voiced by: Rumi Ōkubo / Composition by Yuuyu
Month – March
Birthday – March 3

==== Chisa Togawa (兎川 千桜, Togawa Chisa) ====
Voiced by: Ai Nonaka / Composition by ChouchouP
Month – April
Birthday – April 6

==== Wakaba Yuki (結城 若葉, Yuuki Wakaba) ====
Voiced by: Yumi Uchiyama / Composition by Nem
Month – May
Birthday – May 20

=== Seleas ===
==== Yuno Terase (照瀬 結乃, Terase Yuno) ====
Voiced by: Rina Satō / Composition by Yuyoyuppe
Month – June
Birthday – June 25

==== Mizuki Himekawa (姫川 瑞希, Himekawa Mizuki) ====
Voiced by: Shizuka Ishigami / Composition by Hitoshizuku x Yama△
Month – July
Birthday – July 10

==== Matsuri Motomiya (元宮 祭莉, Motomiya Matsuri) ====
Voiced by: Yuka Ōtsubo / Composition by UtataP
Month – August
Birthday – August 18

==== Akane Asagiri (朝霧 あかね, Asagiri Akane) ====
Voiced by: Kaori Fukuhara / Composition by Jun
Month – September
Birthday – September 11

==== Reina Ichisaki (伊地崎 麗奈, Ichisaki Reina) ====
Voiced by: Tomoyo Kurosawa / Composition by takamatt
Month – October
Birthday – October 3

==== Tsubaki Tendouin (天童院 椿, Tendouin Tsubaki) ====
Voiced by: Sumire Uesaka / Composition by Kikuo
Month – November
Birthday – November 11

== Other characters ==
=== Managers ===
==== Kanade Tsukishiro (月城 奏, Tsukishiro Kanade) ====
Voiced by: Masahiro Yamanaka

- Six Gravity's manager
- Birthday – December 4

Kanade has light grayish-brown hair and brown eyes. He also wears thin-rimmed glasses. Kanade is a quiet, amiable person who always has a smile on his face. He handles his job as Six Gravity's manager quite well, despite them being the first unit and set of idols he has ever managed. He is also very generous, encouraging the members of Six Gravity to voice their whims or if they want anything. Before becoming Six Gravity's manager, Kanade had been a university lecturer. His older sister chose to retire after getting married, so he had been forced into inheriting her position.

Thanks to Hajime's careful guidance and leadership, the members of Six Gravity do not cause much trouble for Kanade, making his job as their manager rather easy. However, Kanade also wants Gravi's members to voice out their whims and become as self-indulging as a performer can become, even for just a bit.

==== Dai Kurotsuki (黒月 大, Kurotsuki Dai) ====
Voiced by: Yasuhiro Mamiya

- Procellarum's manager
- Birthday – August 24

Dai is a well-built man with dark hair and brown eyes. Prior to becoming a manager, Dai was part of a security police task force. He was also hired into TSUKINO TALENT PRODUCTION as a bodyguard, but along the way, he became a manager.

Dai and Kanade, the manager of Six Gravity, get along very well, despite managing sibling and rival units. They often boast about their respective unit members' achievements to each other in a friendly manner. The two also go out to drink whenever there is time or reason to celebrate.

Dai tends to act as Procellarum's bodyguard rather than their manager, but handles them well. To Procellarum, he has earned a position as their father and has actually received a gift from Procella during Father's Day.

=== Other ===
Mikoto Tsukino (月野 尊, Tsukino Mikoto)
The president of Tsukino Talent Production and the producer for Six Gravity and Procellarum.

== Anime ==
An anime for the series was announced at the Animate Girls Festival 2014. The anime titled "Tsukiuta. The Animation" (ツキウタ。 The Animation) (shortened as "Tsukiani." (ツキアニ。)) aired between July and September 2016 on Tokyo MX, BS11, and several other TV channels.

The anime was produced in celebration of Animate's 30th anniversary. The anime focuses on the members of Six Gravity and Procellarum, with a different character being the main focus of each episode. The character's name is incorporated into the title of the episode.

On November 9, 2018, it was announced that the series would receive a second season. The second season is animated by Children's Playground Entertainment, with Yukio Nishimoto replacing Itsuro Kawasaki as director and Natsuko Takahashi replacing Itsuro Kawasaki as script supervisor. The rest of the cast reprised their roles. Originally set to premiere in 2019, it was pushed to April 2020 and delayed again to July 2020 due to the effects of the COVID-19 pandemic, but was delayed again to air from October 7 to December 30, 2020. Funimation acquired the series and streams the series on its website in North America and the British Isles. On November 11, 2020, the company apologized for the poor quality of the sixth episode of Season 2.

=== Music ===
The opening theme alternates between GRAVATIC-LOVE by Six Gravity and LOLV –Lots of Love- by Procellarum. The ending themes are sung by each character in the order of their representative months, starting with December. Episode 13 finished with Tsuki no Uta (ツキノウタ。), a combined song by Six Gravity and Procellarum.

=== Episodes ===
==== Season 1 ====
No.	Title	Featured Character(s)	Ending Theme	Original release date
1	"Betting on the Handshake Event!" "Akushukai ni Kakeru!" (握手会にかける！)	Kakeru Shiwasu	stella〜きんぴか上昇気分〜 By Kakeru Shiwasu	July 6, 2016
2	"Glasswork Heart" "Kagamizaiku no Kokoro" (鏡細工のココロ)	Iku Kannaduki	initium〜始告氷輪〜 By Hajime Mutsuki	July 13, 2016
3	"Going Far Beyond" "Omoi wo Haruka ni" (想いを遥かに)	Haru Yayoi	amor〜溢れだす想いから〜 By Kisaragi Koi	July 20, 2016
4	"On a New Path" "Aratanaru Michi he" (新たなる道へ)	Arata Uduki	ver〜歌詠鳥の声〜 By Haru Yayoi	July 27, 2016
5	"A Chance Encounter with the Past" "Kako to no Kaikou" (過去との邂逅)	Kai Fuduki	cerasus〜桜並木に導かれて〜 By Arata Uduki	August 3, 2016
6	"A Smart Detective!?" "Kashikoi Tantei!?" (賢い探偵!?)	Koi Kisaragi	caelum〜未来〜 By Aoi Satsuki	August 10, 2016
7	"The Hajime Mutsuki Expedition" "Mutsuki Hajime Tankentai" (睦月始探検隊)	Hajime Mutsuki	pluvia〜嘘と温もり〜 By Rui Minaduki	August 17, 2016
8	"Round Moon" "Marui Tsuki" (まるい月)	Rui Minnaduki	mare〜君と綴る航海日誌〜 By Kai Fuduki	August 24, 2016
9	"Night of Overlapping Patterns" "Kasanemoyou no Yoru" (重ね模様の夜)	You Haduki; Yoru Nagatsuki	sol〜Happy!Phew!〜 By You Haduki	August 31, 2016
10	"Blue Flame" "Aoi Honoo" (アオイホノオ)	Aoi Satsuki	nox〜風のレコード〜 By Yoru Nagatsuki	September 7, 2016
11	"Moment of Indecision" "Mayoi no Shunkan" (迷いの瞬間)	Shun Shimotsuki	athletic〜Never Ending Challenge!!〜 By Iku Kannaduki	September 14, 2016
12	"Full Moon Festival" (Full Moon Festival)	Six Gravity; Procellarum	albion〜ふたりだけの白〜 By Shun Shimotsuki	September 21, 2016
13	"Song of the Moon" "Tsuki no Uta." (ツキノウタ。)	Six Gravity; Procellarum	ツキノウタ。By Six Gravity and Procellarum	September 28, 2016

==== Season 2 ====
No.	Title	Featured Character(s)	Ending Theme	Original release date
1	"More than a second ago..." "1-Byō mae yori mo..." (1秒前よりも...)	Shiwasu Kakeru	Kinpika Complete〜きんぴかコンプリート〜 By Shiwasu Kakeru	October 7, 2020
2	"Wish I want to play" "Kanadetai omoi" (奏でたい想い)	Minaduki Rui	Close By Minaduki Rui	October 14, 2020
3	"You are a hero" "Kimi ga hīrō" (君がヒーロー)	Uduki Arata	To the sky where cherry blossoms dance〜桜舞う空へ〜 By Uduki Arata	October 21, 2020
4	"Just get up and dance." (Just get up and dance.)	Haduki You	You and prominence〜キミとプロミネンス〜 By Haduki You	October 28, 2020
5	"With friends and music" "Nakama to ongaku o" (仲間と音楽を)	Yayoi Haru	An unnamed story〜名前の無い物語〜 By Yayoi Haru	November 4, 2020
6	"Cats' journey" "Neko-tachi no tabi" (猫たちの旅)	Fuduki Kai	Valiant Journey By Fuduki Kai	November 11, 2020
7	"Each smile" "Sorezore no egao" (それぞれの笑顔)	Kisaragi Koi	Koibana〜コイバナ〜 By Kisaragi Koi	November 18, 2020
8	"The past, the present, the midnight meal, and the future" "Mukashi to ima to yashoku to mirai to" (昔と今と夜食と未来と)	Kannaduki Iku	Burning Song Continuation〜燃歌続走〜 By Kannaduki Iku	November 25, 2020
9	"Prince's adventure" "Ōji-sama no bōken" (王子様の冒険)	Satsuki Aoi	Fly Together By Satsuki Aoi	December 2, 2020
10	"Back-to-back night" "Senakaawase no yoru" (背中合わせの夜)	Nagatsuki Yoru	Lunar surface observation〜月面観測〜 By Nagatsuki Yoru	December 9, 2020
11	"Those hands" "Sono te" (その手)	Mutsuki Hajime	First butterfly song〜始蝶歌〜 By Mutsuki Hajime	December 16, 2020
12	"With friends" "Nakama to" (仲間と)	Shimotsuki Shun	Cry for ××× By Shimotsuki Shun	December 23, 2020
13	"Full Moon Festival 2020" (Fll Moon Festival 2020)	Six Gravity & Procellarum	Tsukino poetry〜月ノ詩〜 Six Gravity&Procellarum	December 30, 2020

=== Film ===
On April 3, 2022, it was announced that the series would be receiving an anime film titled Rabbits Kingdom the Movie. The film is produced by Studio Sign and directed by Masayoshi Ozaki. It was originally set to premiere in December 2023 but was later delayed to June 14, 2024, due to "various circumstances".

== Stage plays ==
2.5 dimensions of dance live TSUKIUTA STAGE (2.5次元ダンスライブ「ツキウタ。」ステージ, 2.5-jigen dansu raibu "TSUKIUTA". SUTĒJI), or TSUKISTA. (ツキステ。, TSUKISUTE.) for short, is a series of dance live/stage play adaptations of the TSUKIUTA. series.

=== 2.5 Dimension Dance Live "Tsukiuta." Stage (1st Stage) ===
2.5 Dimension Dance Live "Tsukiuta." Stage (Japanese: 2.5次元ダンスライブ「ツキウタ。」ステージ, 2.5-jigen Dansu Raibu "Tsukiuta". Suteeji) was the first stage play of the Tsukiuta. series and ran from April 23 to May 1, 2016, at Seiryokaikan Hall, Japan. It alternated between "ver. black," which featured Six Gravity, and "ver. white", which featured Procellarum.

=== 2.5 Dimension Dance Live "Tsukiuta." Stage: Act II: ~The Legend of Tsukiuta: "Yumemigusa"~ (2nd Stage) ===
2.5 Dimension Dance Live "Tsukiuta." Stage: Act II: ~The Legend of Tsukiuta: "Yumemigusa"~ (Japanese: 2.5次元ダンスライブ「ツキウタ。」ステージ 第二幕 ～月歌奇譚「夢見草」～, 2.5-jigen Dansu Raibu "Tsukiuta". Suteeji Dai-ni-maku ~Tsukiuta Kitan "Yumemigusa"~) is the second installment of the stage play series Tsukiuta. It was held in the Roppongi Blue Theatre from October 27 to 31, 2016. Two versions of the show were performed once per day: the Sakura Chapter (桜の章, sakura-no-shou), with more focus on Six Gravity members Arata and Aoi, and the Moon Chapter (月の章, tsuki-no-shou), centralizing Procellarum's You and Yoru. All members of the cast were featured in these performances.

=== 2.5 Dimension Dance Live "Tsukiuta." Stage: Tri! School Revolution! (3rd Stage) ===
2.5 Dimension Dance Live "Tsukiuta." Stage Tri! School Revolution! (Japanese: 2.5次元ダンスライブ「ツキウタ。」ステージ Tri! School Revolution!, 2.5-jigen Dansu Raibu "Tsukiuta". Suteeji Tri! School Revolution!) is the third in the stage play series of Tsukiuta. Similar to the first stage, two versions were produced: ver. Black featuring Six Gravity (Kakeru and Koi) and ver. white with Procellarum (Shun and Kai). Ver. Black was held at Roppongi Blue Theatre from March 8 to 12, 2017. Ver. White was shown at Hakuhinkan Theatre from March 17 to 26, 2017.

=== 2.5 Dimension Dance Live "Tsukiuta." Stage: Lunatic Party (4th Stage) ===
2.5 Dimension Dance Live "Tsukiuta." Stage: Lunatic Party (Japanese: 2.5次元ダンスライブ「ツキウタ。」ステージ 第4幕『Lunatic Party』, 2.5-jigen Dansu Raibu "Tsukiuta". Suteeji Dai-4-maku "Lunatic Party") is the upcoming 4th installment of the Tsukiuta stage play series. It was scheduled to be held at the Roppongi Blue Theatre from October 11 to 15, 2017. Arata Uduki's actor will be replaced by Ryouhei Takanaka.

=== 2.5 Dimension Dance Live "Tsukiuta." Stage: The Rabbits Kingdom (5th Stage) ===
TSUKIUTA.STAGE THE FIFTH STAGE RABBITS KINGDOM Black versus White (2.5次元ダンスライブ「ツキウタ。」ステージ 第5幕『Rabbits Kingdom』, 2.5-jigen Dansu Raibu "Tsukiuta". Suteeji Dai-5-maku "Rabbits Kingdom"), or, in short, referred to as RABBITS KINGDOM, is the fifth of a series of stage play adaptations of the TSUKIUTA. series.

The performances were held in Osaka at the Sankei Hall Breeze from November 30 to December 3 and in Tokyo at the AiiA 2.5 Theater Tokyo from December 7 to December 22, 2017.

=== 2.5 Dimension Dance Live "Tsukiuta." Stage: Kurenai Enishi (6th stage) ===
2.5 dimensions of dance live TSUKIUTA STAGE Kurenai Enishi (2.5次元ダンスライブ「ツキウタ。」ステージ 第6幕『紅縁』, 2.5-jigen dansu raibu "TSUKIUTA". SUTEEJI Dai-6-maku "Kurenai Enishi"), or, in short, referred to as Kurenai Enishi, is the sixth of a series of dance live adaptations of the TSUKIUTA. series.

The performances were held in Shinagawa at the Stellar Ball from October 18 to November 4, 2018, for a total of 27 performances.

=== 2.5 Dimension Dance Live "Tsukiuta." Stage: CYBER-DIVE-CONNECTION (7th Stage) ===
TSUKISTA. 7th CYBER-DIVE-CONNECTION (2.5次元ダンスライブ「ツキウタ。」ステージ 第7幕『CYBER-DIVE-CONNECTION』, 2.5-jigen Dansu Raibu "TSUKIUTA". SUTEEJI Dai-7-maku "CYBER-DIVE-CONNECTION"), or, in short, referred to as CYBER-DIVE-CONNECTION, is the seventh of a series of stage play adaptations of the TSUKIUTA. series.

The performances were held in Tokyo at the Hulic Theater from December 5 to December 9, and in Osaka at the Miel Parque Hall from December 13 to December 16, 2018, for a total of 17 performances.

=== 2.5 Dimension Dance Live "Tsukiuta." Stage: Tsukino Empire (8th Stage) ===
TSUKIUTA. STAGE THE EIGHTH STAGE TSUKINO EMPIRE UNLEASH YOUR MIND. (2.5次元ダンスライブ「ツキウタ。」ステージ Tsukino Empire, 2.5-jigen Dansu Raibu "TSUKIUTA". SUTEEJI Dai-hachi-maku "Tsukino Empire"), or, in short, referred to as TSUKINO EMPIRE, is the eighth of a series of stage play adaptations of the TSUKIUTA. series. The performances were held in Chiba at the Maihama Amphitheater from March 27 to March 31, 2019, for a total of nine performances.

=== 2.5 Dimension Dance Live "Tsukiuta." Stage: Shiawase Awase (9th Stage) ===
TSUKIUTA STAGE. NINTH STAGE Shiawase Awase (2.5次元ダンスライブ「ツキウタ。」ステージ 第9幕『しあわせあわせ』, 2.5-jigen Dansu Raibu "TSUKIUTA". SUTEEJI Dai-9-maku "Shiawase Awase"), or in short, referred to as Shiawase Awase, is the ninth of a series of stage play adaptations of the TSUKIUTA. series.

The performances were held in Yurakucho, Tokyo, at the Hulic Hall from October 30 to November 4, 2019, for a total of 10 performances.

=== 2.5 Dimension Dance Live "Tsukiuta." Stage: TAIKYOKUDENKI (10th Stage) ===
2.5 dimensions of dance live TSUKIUTA STAGE Tsukiuta Kitan TAIKYOKUDENKI (2.5次元ダンスライブ「ツキウタ。」ステージ 第10幕「月歌奇譚 太極伝奇」, 2.5-jigen Dansu Raibu "TSUKIUTA". SUTEEJI Dai-10-maku "Tsukiuta Kitan TAIKYOKUDENKI"), or in short referred to as TAIKYOKUDENKI, is the tenth of a series of stage play adaptations of the TSUKIUTA. series.

The performances were held in Yurakucho, Tokyo at the Hulic Hall from January 29 to February 2, 2020, for a total of nine performances.

=== 2.5 Dimension Dance Live "Tsukiuta." Stage: TSUKIHANA KAGURA (11th Stage) ===
==== Venue ====
Japan, Hulic Hall, 〒100-0006 Tokyo, Chiyoda City, Yurakucho, 2 Chome−5−1, Yurakucho Center Building, 11F

==== Schedule ====
September 30 (Thursday) to October 11 (Monday), 2021; all 16 performances.

*Venue, schedule, etc. are subject to change without notice.

=== 2.5 Dimension Dance Live "Tsukiuta." Stage: ZANSHIN (12th Stage) ===
==== Venue ====
Japan Seinenkan Hall 4-1 Kasumigaoka-cho, Shinjuku-ku, Tokyo 160-0013

==== Schedule ====
March 25 (Friday) to April 3 (Sunday), 2022; all 15 performances.

=== 2.5 Dimension Dance Live "Tsukiuta." Stage: TSUKINO HYAKKIYAKOU (13th Stage) ===
==== Venue ====
Japan, Hulic Hall, 〒100-0006 Tokyo, Chiyoda City, Yurakucho, 2 Chome−5−1, Yurakucho Center Building, 11F

==== Schedule ====
Fourteen performances from November 25 (Friday) to December 4 (Sunday), 2022.

=== Cast ===
The initial cast, along with the staff, venue and performance dates, was announced by Animate.

Six Gravity
- Hajime Mutsuki – Kentaro Menjo (former), Gouki Agata
- Haru Yayoi – Nakada Hiroki (former), Matsuda Gaku
- Arata Uduki – Taiki Yamazaki (act 1–3), Takenaka Ryouhei (act 4–8), Nakajima Reiki
- Aoi Satsuki – Tatsuki Jounin
- Kakeru Shiwasu – Kiyama Ryuu (former), Sawabe Neo
- Koi Kisaragi – Yokoo Lui (former), Suzuki Youta
Procellarum
- Shun Shimotsuki – Tomotsune Yuuki (former), TAKA Cubers
- Kai Fuduki – Kazumi Doi (former), Hirai Yuuki
- You Haduki – Washio Shuto (former), Kurita Manabu
- Yoru Nagatsuki – Yoshiki Tani (former), Yuusuke Akiba
- Rui Minaduki – Yuusaku Sato
- Iku Kannaduki – Tsubasa Sasa (former), Ryouki Miyama

== Games ==
=== Mobile ===
There were two mobile applications for Tsukiuta. – Tsukino Park, an application featuring mini games and media release information; and Tsukino Paradise (Tsukipara.), a rhythm game published by Bandai Namco Entertainment. Both mobile games also featured characters from the other groups under TsukiPro. The two games were available on both iOS and Android. Tsukino Park was discontinued on November 30, 2018. Tsukino Paradise was discontinued on February 5, 2020.

=== PS Vita ===
A PlayStation Vita game titled Tsukitomo. -Tsukiuta. 12 memories- (ツキトモ。- Tsukiuta. 12 memories-) was released on June 1, 2017. Unlike the mobile games, the Vita game solely features the Tsukiuta. groups of Six Gravity and Procellarum. The game was released both as a packaged version and as a digital download, with Animate receiving a limited edition that included physical goods and extra downloadable content.

== Discography ==
=== Singles ===
==== Solo Singles ====
Release date	Title	Artist
December 7, 2012	聖夜も労働ingなう！(Seiya mo roudou-ing nau!)	Kakeru Shiwasu
December 7, 2012	聖夜もOnline! (Seiya mo Online!)	Kurisu Hijiri
January 11, 2013	氷輪紫鬼 (Hyourin Shiki)	Hajime Mutsuki
January 11, 2013	六花撫子 (Rikka nadeshiko)	Yuki Hanazono
February 1, 2013	Me-lo-dy	Koi Kisaragi
February 1, 2013	Acacia	Ai Kisaragi
March 1, 2013	ウグイス・コード -春告鳥の歌- (Uguisu code -harutsugedori no uta-)	Haru Yayoi
March 1, 2013	春待ち息吹は君恋し (Harumachi ibuki wa kimi koishi)	Hina Momosaki
April 5, 2013	桜とともに君だけを。(Sakura to tomo ni kimi dake wo.)	Arata Uduki
April 5, 2013	sing my way	Chisa Togawa
May 10, 2013	カルミアと五月雨 (Karumia to samidare)	Aoi Satsuki
May 10, 2013	LOVE FRUIT	Wakaba Yuki
June 7, 2013	Rainy moment	Rui Minaduki
July 5, 2013	さよなら夢花火 (Sayonara yume hanabi)	Kai Fuduki
August 9, 2013	Genau!	You Haduki
September 6, 2013	コガネイロ (Koganeiro)	Yoru Nagatsuki
October 4, 2013	Run Boy Run	Iku Kannaduki
November 1, 2013	アイシクル (Icicle)	Shun Shimotsuki
January 30, 2015	雨女って言わないで (Ame onna tte iwanaide)	Yuno Terase
February 27, 2015	彼は誰の夢 (Kawatare no yume)	Mizuki Himekawa
March 27, 2015	招き招かれお祭りモード (Maneki manekare omatsuri mo-do)	Matsuri Motomiya
April 24, 2015	こがれびと (Kogarebito)	Akane Asagiri
May 29, 2015	Sugar★Sugar★MAGiC★	Reina Ichisaki
June 26, 2015	流星舞台(Ryusei butai)	Tsubaki Tendouin
June 26, 2015	砂時計とホットミルク (Sunadokei to hot milk)	Kakeru Shiwasu
June 26, 2015	Duty	Rui Minaduki
July 31, 2015	Faith and Promise	Haru Yayoi
July 31, 2015	Beast Master	Kai Fuduki
August 28, 2015	君、舞い降りる (Kimi, mai oriru)	Arata Uduki
August 28, 2015	El Sol Florecer	You Haduki
September 18, 2015	ハルカゼとヒバリ (Harukaze to hibari)	Aoi Satsuki
September 18, 2015	夕焼けデイズ (Yuuyake days)	Yoru Nagatsuki
October 30, 2015	ラジカル・ラブカル (Rajikaru rabukaru)	Koi Kisaragi
October 30, 2015	Lost My God	Iku Kannaduki
November 27, 2015	嗚呼。髪を撫でて、頬を撫でて、 御前を愛してやる。(Aa, kami wo nadete, hoho wo nadete, omae wo aishiteyaru)	Hajime Mutsuki
November 27, 2015	Monochrome sky	Shun Shimotsuki
January 22, 2016	Hee!Hee!Foo!Foo!	You Haduki
July 8, 2016	プリズム☆ブレイク (Prism☆Break)	Kurisu Hijiri
July 15, 2016	はらり (Harari)	Yuki Hanazono
July 22, 2016	My Sweet Beloved	Ai Kisaragi
July 29, 2016	このこねこのこ (Kono koneko no ko)	Hina Momosaki
August 5, 2016	桜通り (Sakura doori)	Chisa Togawa
August 12, 2016	wonderful world〜5月病をぶっ飛ばせ！〜 (wonderful world~ gogatsu byou wo buttobase!~)	Wakaba Yuki
August 19, 2016	My Longing	Yuno Terase
August 26, 2016	夢守唄 (Yume mori uta)	Mitsuki Himekawa
September 2, 2016	戯れ囃子に恋い焦がれ (Tawamura hayashi ni koikogare)	Matsuri Motomiya
September 9, 2016	セピア -SEPIA-	Akane Asagiri
September 16, 2016	Night Before Halloween	Reina Ichisaki
September 23, 2016	嘆きの谷のカメーリア (Nageki no tani no camellia)	Tsubaki Tendouin
December 28, 2018	Moonshot!!	Kakeru Shiwasu
December 28, 2018	クリスマスきらい (Christmas Kirai)	Kurisu Hijiri
January 25, 2019	「紫月夜」(Shigetsuya)	Hajime Mutsuki
January 25, 2019	「徒花」(Adabana)	Yuki Hanazono
February 22, 2019	Tomorrow's Color	Koi Kisaragi
February 22, 2019	「2月のメリーゴーランド」(nigatsu no melody land)	Ai Kisaragi
March 29, 2019	Gift	Haru Yayoi
March 29, 2019	「フリージア」(Freesia)	Hina Momosaki
April 26, 2019	Story of Colors	Arata Uduki
April 26, 2019	「サクラメモリー」(Sakura Memory)	Chisa Togawa
May 31, 2019	「リーンカーネーション」(Reincarnation)	Aoi Satsuki
May 31, 2019	「青いトロイメライ」(Blue Träumerei)	Wakaba Yuki
January 29, 2021	「きんぴかコンプリート」(Kinpika Complete)	Kakeru Shiwasu
January 29, 2021	「Close」	Rui Minaduki
February 26, 2021	「桜舞う空へ」(Sakura Mau Sora e)	Arata Uduki
February 26, 2021	「キミとプロミネンス」(Kimi to Prominence)	You Haduki
February 26, 2021	「メルヘンチック」(Meruhenchikku / Merhentic)	Yuno Terase
February 26, 2021	Tear	Rui Minaduki
March 26, 2021	Dramatical Hunter	Mizuki Himekawa
March 26, 2021	夢送り人	Kai Fuduki
May 28, 2021	「You-I Duality」	Matsuri Motomiya
May 28, 2021	Rin-Ne-Ten-Show	You Haduki
June 25, 2021	「コイバナ」(Koibana)	Koi Kisaragi
June 25, 2021	「燃歌続走」(Nenka Zokusou / Burning Song Continuation)	Iku Kannaduki
June 25, 2021	「小さな願い」(Chiisana Negai / A Small Wish)	Akane Asagiri
June 25, 2021	ルミナ	Yoru Nagatsuki
July 30, 2021	「Fly Together」	Aoi Satsuki
July 30, 2021	「月面観測」(Getsumen Kasoku / Lunar Surface Observation)	Yoru Nagatsuki
July 30, 2021	「サウィンの奇跡(I miss you.)」(Sawin no Kiseki)	Reina Ichisaki
July 30, 2021	「Autumn Note	Iku Kannaduki
August 27, 2021	「始蝶歌」(Hajime Chouka / First Butterfly Song)	Hajime Mutsuki
August 27, 2021	「Cry for ×××」	Shun Shimotsuki
August 27, 2021	月凍詩篇-或る羊飼いのウタ-	Tsubaki Tendouin
August 27, 2021	彩を失う	Shun Shimotsuki
November 26, 2021	「名前の無い物語」(Namae no nai Monogatari / Nameless Song)	Haru Yayoi
November 26, 2021	「Valiant Journey」	Kai Fuduki

==== Duet Singles ====
Release date	Title	Artist
December 27, 2013	だってまだまだアバンタイトル (Datte mada mada avant title)	Kakeru Shiwasu & Koi Kisaragi
January 26, 2014	恋忘れ草 (Koi wasuregusa)	Hajime Mutsuki & Haru Yayoi
February 28, 2014	イノセンシア (Innocencia)	Kakeru Shiwasu & Koi Kisaragi
March 28, 2014	ハジマリノハル (Hajimari no haru)	Hajime Mutsuki & Haru Yayoi
May 30, 2014	Rainy Day	Arata Uduki & Aoi Satsuki
May 30, 2014	月と、星と、まぼろしと (Tsuki to, hoshi to, maboroshi to)	Arata Uduki & Aoi Satsuki
June 27, 2014	Childish flower	Rui Minaduki & Iku Kannaduki
July 25, 2014	君に花 を、君に星を (Kimi ni hana wo, kimi ni hoshi wo)	Kai Fuduki & Shun Shimotsuki
August 22, 2014	Da☆Kai	You Haduki & Yoru Nagatsuki
September 26, 2014	淡い花 (Awai hana)	You Haduki & Yoru Nagatsuki
October 24, 2014	Sing Together Forever	Rui Minaduki & Iku Kannaduki
November 28, 2014	Celestite	Kai Fuduki & Shun Shimotsuki
April 10, 2015	ツキウサ。体操 (Tsukiuta. Taisou)	Kanade Tsukishiro & Dai Kurotsuki
January 29, 2016	ショコラの魔法 (Chocolate no mahou)	Koi Kisaragi & Ai Kisaragi
January 29, 2016	Yum-Yum!! Love!?	Iku Kannaduki & Reina Ichizaki
December 30, 2022	クリプトグラム	Kakeru Shiwasu & Koi Kisaragi
January 27, 2023	春冬花	Hajime Mutsuki & Haru Yayoi
February 24, 2023	REBUILD	Koi Kisaragi & Iku Kannaduki
March 31, 2023	白道とエトワール	Haru Yayoi & Kai Fuduki
April 28, 2023	Be Your Hero	Arata Uduki & Aoi Satsuki
May 26, 2023	梔子の花	Aoi Satsuki & Yoru Nagatsuki
June 30, 2023	マバユイストロボ	Rui Minaduki & Kakeru Shiwasu
July 28, 2023	クリソベリル	Kurisu Hijiri & Hina Momosaki
July 28, 2023	Crazy Buddy	Kai Fuduki & Shun Shimotsuki
August 25, 2023	フタリノヒカリ	Yuki Hanazono & Ai Kisaragi
August 25, 2023	Wavy!	You Haduki & Arata Uduki
September 29, 2023	翼の詩	Chisa Togawa & Wakaba Yuki
September 29, 2023	ユメイト、君と僕を結ぶ	Yoru Nagatsuki & You Haduki
October 27, 2023	Shiny Symphony	Yuno Terase & Mizuki Himekawa
October 27, 2023	ワガママ	Iku Kannaduki & Rui Minaduki
November 24, 2023	Fire! Fever! Night	Matsuri Motomiya & Akane Asagiri
November 24, 2023	Light & Dark	Shun Shimotsuki & Hajime Mutsuki
December 29, 2023	Stars in my heart	Tsubaki Tendouin & Reina Ichisaki

==== Unit Singles ====
Release date	Title	Artist
February 27, 2015	Gravity!	Six Gravity
March 27, 2015	One Chance?	Procellarum
August 26, 2016	GRAVITIC-LOVE	Six Gravity
August 26, 2016	LOLV -Lots of Love-	Procellarum
December 28, 2018	Fluna!	Fluna
March 29, 2019	Seleas	Seleas
September 13, 2019	「ツキノウタ。」(Tsuki no Uta)	Six Gravity & Procellarum
June 26, 2020	Paint it Black	Six Gravity
June 26, 2020	White Sparks	Procellarum
December 24, 2020	「月ノ詩。」(Tsuki no Uta)	Six Gravity & Procellarum
March 31, 2023	「めぐりあい」 (Encounter)	Fluna & Seleas
September 29, 2023	Dear Dreamer (ver. Six Gravity & Procellarum)	Six Gravity & Procellarum
September 29, 2023	Dear Dreamer (ver. Fluna & Seleas)	Fluna & Seleas
June 28, 2024	Best Wishes (ver. Six Gravity & Procellarum)	Six Gravity & Procellarum
June 28, 2024	Best Wishes (ver. Fluna & Seleas)	Fluna & Seleas
June 28, 2024	「ツキアカリスタートライン」	Fluna
October 25, 2024	Fairytale	Seleas
August 2, 2025	「宵祭り」	Six Gravity
September 26, 2025	P time	Procellarum

=== Albums ===
Release date	Title	Artist
November 14, 2014	はじまりの日 (Hajimari no hi)	じょん (John)
February 12, 2016	黒月 (Kurotsuki)	Six Gravity
February 12, 2016	白月 (Shirotsuki)	Procellarum
March 11, 2016	花月 (Hanatsuki)	Fluna
March 11, 2016	星月 (Hoshitsuki)	Seleas
September 13, 2019	アルバム2「黒望月」(Album 2: Black Full Moon)	Six Gravity
September 13, 2019	アルバム2「白望月」(Album 2: White Full Moon)	Procellarum

=== Drama CDs ===
Release date	Title	Artist
May 10, 2013	ツキウタ。ドラマ！(Tsukiuta. Drama!)	Six Gravity
September 6, 2013	ツキウタ。ドラマ！その2 (Tsukiuta. Drama! Sono 2)	Six Gravity
November 1, 2013	ツキウタ。ドラマ！その3 (Tsukiuta. Drama! Sono 3)	Procellarum
July 25, 2014	ツキウタ。ドラマ！その4 (Tsukiuta. Drama! Sono 4)	Procellarum
July 25, 2014	魔王様IN通販ワンダーランド (Maou-sama IN tsuhan wonderland)	Procellarum
April 30, 2015	ツキウタ。ドラマ！その5 (Tsukiuta. Drama! Sono 5)	Six Gravity
July 25, 2015	ツキウタ。ドラマ！その6 (Tsukiuta. Drama! Sono 6)	Procellarum
February 22, 2016	池袋月猫物語 (Ikebukuro tsukineko monogatari)	Six Gravity Procellarum
