= Egg Car =

Japanese-Chinese anime television series

エッグカー (Eggukā)
- Genre: Fantasy
- Anime television series
- Directed by: Akira Iwamoto
- Produced by: Yun Zhensong; Jian Liyang; Juan Wang; Zhi Jiehan; Sayako Muramatsu
- Written by: Hiro Satouchi
- Music by: Matsuoka Hirotaka
- Studio: Children's Playground Entertainment; Cheer Digiart
- Original network: CCTV-1; TV Tokyo
- Original run: July 26, 2019 – October 1, 2020
- Episodes: 52

Egg Car (エッグカー, Eggukā) (simplified Chinese: 奔奔小飞车; traditional Chinese: 奔奔小飛車; pinyin: Bēnbèn Biǎofēichē) is a Japanese-Chinese fantasy anime series produced by Yun Zhensong, Jian Liyang, Juan Wang, Zhi Jiehan and Sayako Muramatsu. Its 52 episodes were aired from July 26, 2019, to October 1, 2020.

== Plot ==
After his family was kidnapped from Boo Boo Island by King Bozo during a freak accident in the Egg Islands (based on Japan and China), Dash had gained the ability to transform into cars and use elements powers. Dash must find the elements to defeat the dark king Bozo once and for all. He must defeat Bozo's minions and the Iron Gang also appeared before he collects elements. Should Dash's quest results in failure, Egg Island will be exterminated and his family and the Egg Cars will be killed.

== Characters ==
Dash (ダッシュ) (Chinese: 奔奔)
Voiced by: Mutsumi Tamura
A human boy who living in Boo Boo Island. He has the ability to transform into various cars
Click (クリック) (Chinese: 点点)
Voiced by: Yuki Uchiyama
A hedgehog/car hybrid from Poka Poka Island. He is allergic to peppers.
Aera (アエラ) (Chinese: 小爱)
Voiced by: Yuri Komagata
A girl who looks for Dash. Her enemies were spiders.
Girara (ギララ) (Chinese: 高拉拉)
Voiced by: Hiroyuki Kagura
A giraffe/car hybrid from Poka Poka Island who is a childhood friend.
Iron Gang (アイアン一味) (Chinese: 酷炫铁皮队)
Voiced by: Shintaro Tanaka (Iron), Takatsugu Awazu (Pilaf), Hiroyuki Honda (Off)
Bozo's minions who plans to kill Dash.
