= Itsuro Kawasaki =

Japanese director of anime

Itsuro Kawasaki (川崎 逸朗, Kawasaki Itsurō) is a Japanese animator, storyboard artist, screenwriter, and director from Tokyo.

== Works ==
=== Anime television ===
- Popolocrois Monogatari (1998–99) – Assistant Director, Episode Director
- Arc the Lad (1999) – Director
- Wild Arms: Twilight Venom (1999–2000) – Series Director, Storyboard
- Love Hina (2000) – Storyboard
- Noir (2001) – Storyboard, Episode director
- Chitchana Yukitsukai Sugar (2001–02) – Storyboard, Episode director
- Shaman King (2001–02) – Storyboard
- Ghost in the Shell: Stand Alone Complex (2002–03) – Storyboard
- Kiddy Grade (2002–03) – Storyboard
- L/R: Licensed by Royalty (2003) – Director
- Ghost in the Shell: S.A.C. 2nd GIG (2004–05) – Storyboard
- Kaiketsu Zorori (2004–05) – Storyboard
- Canvas 2: Niji Iro no Sketch (2005–06) – Director
- Mamoru-kun ni Megami no Shukufuku o! (2006) – Director
- Nanatsuiro Drops (2007) – Storyboard
- Rental Magica (2007–08) – Director, Storyboard
- White Album (2009) – Storyboard
- Chrome Shelled Regios (2009) – Director
- Sengoku Basara: Samurai Kings (2009) – Director, Storyboard
- Umi Monogatari (2009) – Episode Director
- The Legend of the Legendary Heroes (2010) – Director
- Listen to Me, Girls. I Am Your Father! (2012) – Director
- Shining Hearts: Shiawase no Pan (2012) – Director, Writer
- Lady Jewelpet (2014) – Director
- Samurai Jam -Bakumatsu Rock- (2014) – Director
- Tsukiuta. THE ANIMATION (2016) – Director, Writer
- Magical Girl Ore (2018) – Director, Writer
- The Morose Mononokean II (2019) – Director
- True Cooking Master Boy (2019–21) – Director, Writer
- The Yakuza's Guide to Babysitting (2022) – Director
- Flaglia (2023) – Director
- The Foolish Angel Dances with the Devil (2024) – Director, Writer
- Babanba Banban Vampire (2025) – Director, Writer
- Red Riding Hood: A Detective Story (2027) – Director, Writer
- Shōzen (2027) – Director, Writer

=== Original video animation ===
- Video Girl Ai (1992) – Animation Director
- Mega Man: Upon a Star (1993) – Director
- Please Save My Earth (1993–94) – Assistant Director
- Bronze: Zetsuai Since 1989 (1994) – Director
- Dimensional Adventure Numa Monjar (1996) – Director
- Chrono Trigger: Time and Space (1996) – Director
- Canvas ~Motif of Sepia~ (2001–02) – Director
- I'll/CKBC (2002) – Director
- Love Hina Again (2002) – Storyboard
- Pokémon Origins (2013) – Director
- Star Fox Zero: The Battle Begins (2016) – Assistant Director

=== Original net animation ===
- B: The Beginning Succession (2021) – Director
- Yokoso Scooby-Doo! (TBA) – Director

=== Film ===
- Tsubasa Reservoir Chronicle the Movie: The Princess in the Birdcage Kingdom (2005) – Director

=== Video games ===
- Sonic Riders – Opening cinematic director and storyboard artist.
