= Heroine? Saint? No, I'm an All-Works Maid (and Proud of It)! =

Japanese light novel series

- First light novel volume cover

ヒロイン？聖女？いいえ、オールワークスメイドです（誇）！ (Hiroin? Seijo? Īe, Ōruwākusu Meido Desu (Hoko)!)
- Genre: Fantasy, isekai
- Novel series
- Written by: Atekichi
- Published by: Shōsetsuka ni Narō; Kakuyomu
- Original run: February 1, 2017 – present
- Light novel
- Written by: Atekichi
- Illustrated by: Yukiko
- Published by: TO Books
- English publisher: NA: Seven Seas Entertainment
- Imprint: TO Bunko
- Original run: March 10, 2020 – present
- Volumes: 10
- Manga
- Written by: Atekichi
- Illustrated by: Keiko
- Published by: TO Books
- English publisher: NA: Seven Seas Entertainment
- Imprint: Corona Comics
- Magazine: Comic Corona
- Original run: May 10, 2021 – present
- Volumes: 7
- Anime television series
- Directed by: Shinji Ishihira (chief); Naoya Murakawa
- Written by: Toshizō Nemoto
- Music by: Ken Ito
- Studio: EMT Squared
- Licensed by: Crunchyroll
- Original network: Tokyo MX, BS Fuji, AT-X
- Original run: July 1, 2026 – September 16, 2026
- Episodes: 12
- icon

Heroine? Saint? No, I'm an All-Works Maid (and Proud of It)! (Japanese: ヒロイン？聖女？いいえ、オールワークスメイドです（誇）！, Hepburn: Hiroin? Seijo? Īe, Ōruwākusu Meido Desu (Hoko)!) is a Japanese light novel series written by Atekichi and illustrated by Yukiko. It began serialization on the user-generated novel publishing websites Shōsetsuka ni Narō and Kakuyomu in February 2017, before being acquired and published by TO Books under their TO Bunko imprint since March 2020. A manga adaptation illustrated by Keiko began serialization on the Nico Nico Seiga website under TO Books' Comic Corona brand in May 2021. An anime television series adaptation produced by EMT Squared aired from July to September 2026.

== Premise ==
Celeste McMurdon recovers memories of her past life as Ritsuko Mizunami upon seeing a maid as a child. In her past life she showed signs of great intelligence as a child, but her life felt empty until she was enamored by the sight of maid while on a trip to England. Afterwards, she dedicated her life to training herself to be the perfect maid. However, she died in a plane crash on her way to train in England. Following the death of her mother to illness, Celeste vows to be the greatest maid in her honor; a voice tells her that she had unlocked magic. Unbeknownst to Celeste, she has reincarnated as the heroine of an otome game called "Five Oaths of the Saint"; she's already broken the plot by being unaware and uncaring of anything but fulfilling her past life's dream. Using her magic, Celeste hides her true hair and eye color, having read in her mother's will that she is the illegitimate daughter of a count; taking the alias Melody Wave, as another precaution, she heads off to avoid being pulled into a noble family and being denied her dream again.

== Characters ==
Celeste McMurdon (セレスティ・マクマーデン, Seresuti Makumāden) / "Melody Wave" (メロディ・ウェーブ, Merodi Uēbu)
Voiced by: Yume Miyamoto
The protagonist of the series. Melody finally gets to live her life's dream of being the perfect maid after unintentionally being part of an isekai by death event; having never heard of otome games, Melody has zero clue that she has an important role in her new world. She constantly gets involved by sheer accident with people whom were meant to meet Celeste after she was found by her father Count Regibas. Melody works as the sole maid of her employers, for their home in the capital; using her magic to create clones to divide up the tasks.
Melody remains ignorant of the fact she is a saint and her magic is so powerful that most others would have conquered the world if they wished to; even the narrator thinks she's a moron for wasting such power. The reason she can use complex magic without issue is that Melody carries out calculations subconsciously, thanks to her past brilliance as Ritsuko.
Luciana Rutleberg (ルシアナ・ルトルバーグ, Rushiana Rutorubāgu)
Voiced by: Rumi Okubo
The young heiress of the house Melody is employed at. She was meant to have a lonely and miserable life due to her parents' neglect for her and their house in the capital; making her resentful and the perfect vessel for the demon king's spirit to inhabit. Melody's companionship eliminates these factors; even making Luciana call out parents on their lack of initiative.
She loves Melody like family despite being reminded of their statuses. Luciana often has Melody teach her, even if she is very spartan in her methods.
Christopher Von Théolas (クリストファー・フォン・テオラス, Kurisutofā Fon Teorasu) and Anna-Marie Victirium (アンネマリー・ヴィクティリウム, Annemarī Vuikutiriumu)
Voiced by: Kōhei Amasaki and Voiced by: Yoko Hikasa
The crown prince, who is the main male character, and the villainess of the otome game, respectively, like Melody, they are reincarnations from Earth; however, unlike her, they were fans of the otome game. They unintentionally link Ritsuko to their reincarnation into the game by talking to her about it before their plane crashed. The two of them used their past life knowledge to better the kingdom, including the scheduled carriages rides that helped Melody avoid the knights whom would have forced to meet her father Count Regibas. They attempt to find Celeste and protect her until her role is needed; unaware Celeste accomplishes everything and more thanks to her ignorance under her Melody identity.
Ultimately, they give up and decide to go through with their engagement as Celeste will not appear.
Lectias Froude (レクティアス・フロード, Rekutiasu Furōdo)
Voiced by: Yūki Ono
Byūku (ビューク)
Voiced by: Shun Horie
Demon King (魔王, Maō)
Voiced by: Shugo Nakamura
Celina McMurdon
The deceased mother of Celeste and the former maid and lover of Count Regibas. Celina did have a genuine loving relationship, but was forced to break up with her lover by the previous count; she did not tell either that she was pregnant when she left. Celina was perfectly aware of how much Celeste admired maids and decided to leave in her will that she would support Celeste's choice to find such employment; unintentionally allowing Celeste to break free of "Five Oaths of the Saint" as she made a vow to Celina to be the best maid, rather than make a romantic one to a boy. Unfortunately for her, Celina would have been reunited with her beloved had she not contracted an illness just a month earlier; he had become the next Count and sent his knights to look for her.
Count Regibas
Celeste's father. After hearing of Celina's death and that she had given birth to his daughter, the count has been having his knights look for her. He wants to meet her, despite the low likelihood of such an event happening. His head knight figured out that Melody Wade was his daughter in disguise; since it would be socially unacceptable for a count's daughter to be a maid, which is the life long dream of Melody, her true identity is kept secret from him.

== Media ==
=== Light novel ===
Written by Atekichi, Heroine? Saint? No, I'm an All-Works Maid (and Proud of It)! began serialization on the user-generated novel publishing websites Shōsetsuka ni Narō and Kakuyomu on February 1, 2017, which was later acquired and published by TO Books under their TO Bunko imprint with illustrations by Yukiko on March 10, 2020, with ten volumes released as of July 1, 2026.

In June 2024, Seven Seas Entertainment announced that they have licensed the series for English publication beginning in December that same year.

No.	Original release date	Original ISBN	North American release date	North American ISBN
1	March 10, 2020	978-4-86472-938-3	November 14, 2024 (digital); December 24, 2024 (print)	979-8-89160-739-2
2	February 20, 2021	978-4-86699-129-0	February 27, 2025 (digital); March 25, 2025 (print)	979-8-89160-912-9
3	September 20, 2023	978-4-86699-950-0	June 26, 2025 (digital); July 1, 2025 (print)	979-8-89160-999-0
4	January 15, 2024	978-4-86794-046-4	September 25, 2025 (digital); October 21, 2025 (print)	979-8-89373-381-5
5	May 15, 2024	978-4-86794-181-2	January 15, 2026 (digital); February 3, 2026 (print)	979-8-89373-632-8
6	October 1, 2024	978-4-86794-324-3	May 7, 2026 (digital); June 9, 2026 (print)	979-8-89373-809-4
7	May 15, 2025	978-4-86794-571-1	September 3, 2026 (digital); October 6, 2026 (print)	979-8-89765-116-0
8	October 10, 2025	978-4-86794-740-1	February 23, 2027 (print)	979-8-89765-913-5
9	April 1, 2026	978-4-86794-957-3	—	—
10	July 1, 2026	978-4-86854-045-8	—	—

=== Manga ===
A manga adaptation illustrated by Keiko began serialization on the Nico Nico Seiga website under TO Books' Comic Corona brand on May 10, 2021, with its chapters collected into seven tankōbon volumes as of July 2026.

In June 2024, Seven Seas Entertainment announced that they have licensed the manga for English publication beginning in November that same year.

No.	Original release date	Original ISBN	North American release date	North American ISBN
1	July 15, 2021	978-4-86699-272-3	November 26, 2024	979-8-89160-733-0
Chapters 1–5; Extra: Other Tales; Extra: "The Path to Non-Lethal Torture Implements"
2	March 15, 2022	978-4-86699-478-9	February 4, 2025	979-8-89160-866-5
Chapters 6–10; Extra: Other Tales; Extra: "All-Works Maid Paula and the Angel Dress"
3	November 15, 2022	978-4-86699-709-4	May 13, 2025	979-8-89160-947-1
Chapters 10–14; Extra: Other Tales; Extra: "A Reincarnated Villainess? No, I Just Want to Invent Cool Spells!"
4	January 15, 2024	978-4-86794-052-5	September 2, 2025	979-8-89373-349-5
Chapters 15–19; Extra: "Clumsy Luciana's Maid-for-A-Day Experience: Kitchen Edition"
5	October 1, 2024	978-4-86794-320-5	January 6, 2026	979-8-89373-810-0
Chapters 20–24; Extra: "A Day in the Life of Childhood Friends"
6	May 15, 2025	978-4-86794-563-6	May 5, 2026	979-8-89373-939-8
Chapters 25–29; Extra: Other Tales; Extra: "Those She Left Behind"
7	July 1, 2026	978-4-86794-934-4	March 30, 2027	979-8-89863-187-1

=== Anime ===
An anime television series adaptation was announced on May 12, 2025. It is produced by EMT Squared and directed by Naoya Murakawa, with Shinji Ishihira serving as chief director, Toshizō Nemoto handling series composition, Eri Tokugawa designing the characters, and Ken Ito composing the music. The series aired from July 1 to September 16, 2026, on Tokyo MX and other networks. The opening theme song is "Madual↔Heart" (マデュアル↔ハート, Maduaru↔Hāto), performed by Yume Miyamoto and Rumi Okubo as their respective characters, while the ending theme song is "Handmade" (ハンドメイド, Hando Meido), performed by Shugo Nakamura. Crunchyroll streamed the series.

==== Episodes ====
No.	Title	Directed by	Written by	Storyboarded by	Original release date (Note: Episodes are released on dAnime Store, ABEMA and Crunchyroll a week before their televised airings.)
1	"The Girl Who Wanted to Be a Maid"; Transliteration: "Meido ni Naritakatta Shōjo" (Japanese: メイドになりたかった少女)	Naoya Murakawa	Toshizō Nemoto	Shinji Ishihira	July 1, 2026
Melody Wave works as an "All Works Maid" for Lady Luciana Rutleberg. Flashbacks show Melody was Celestia McMarden, and after seeing her first maid she fell in love with the profession. When her mother died, she left a letter revealing Celestia's father is Count Cloud Leginbarth. Around the same time, Celestia suddenly gained powerful magical abilities which she decided to use to become an excellent maid, unaware she just became the most powerful mage in the world. Not wishing to be a noble's daughter, she uses magic to change her appearance and name. Meanwhile, Cloud has already sent knights to find her. Travelling to the royal capital Commerce Guild, she accepts the worst position available, All Works Maid for a Count's family, meaning she will be the only servant responsible for all the work. She meets Luciana living neglected in dire circumstances, who is baffled Melody seems eager to take on the work. Melody is actually a reincarnation from Japan, Ritsuko Mizunami, an academic genius bored with the world, until she met a maid from England. Becoming a maid otaku, she decided to train as a maid in England, but died in a plane crash. These memories she suddenly unlocked after seeing her first maid as Celestia, reigniting her passion and intellect. As Luciana's mansion is dilapidated, Melody creates 100 clones of herself to do a total renovation.
2	"At This Moment, a Maid's Superiority Is About to Unfold"; Transliteration: "Ima Koko ni Meido no Musō ga Hajimarimasu" (Japanese: 今ここにメイドの無双が始まります)	Naoya Murakawa	Toshizō Nemoto	Naoya Murakawa	July 8, 2026
Melody obliviously hunts monsters for dinner in the forbidden Great Vanargand Woods, triggering alarms that alert Archmage Sven and King Garnard. While shopping, Melody is splashed with vinegar by a maid named Paula, who takes her to her employer's mansion for a bath. This forces Melody to manage her magical disguise, which hides the blue eyes and silver hair inherited from her mother and Count Cloud respectively. Exiting the bath, she encounters Paula's employer, Sir Lectias, one of the knights sent by Cloud to find her. Embarrassed, Melody swiftly erases his memory. Lectias awakens remembering her only as the girl he guided to the Commerce Guild, unaware she is the missing Celestia. Later, Luciana's parents are astounded by the mansion's improvements and Melody's 100 clones. When Luciana forgets her school admission certificate, Melody teleports to deliver it. A flashback reveals this world is based on a game, Silver Saint and Five Oaths. Melody meets Prince Christopher (a reincarnated player named Hideki from the plane crash), who is confused to meet a black-haired maid instead of the silver-haired heroine he was expecting. His classmate Anne-Marie (reincarnated player Anna) is furious he messed it up as becoming friends with the heroine is vital to defeat an evil demon in the future. Luciana panics about finding a society debut escort for her upcoming 15th birthday.
3	"Two Girls Proceed to the Royal Castle"; Transliteration: "Ni-nin no Shōjo wa Ōjō e Omomuku" (Japanese: 二人の少女は王城へ赴く)	Akira Shimizu	Toshizō Nemoto	Shinji Ishihira	July 15, 2026
Luciana is confused when Maxwell, son of Lord Chancellor Georic and aide to Prince Christopher, escorts her to the party as a favour to Melody, whom had befriended him on her journey to the royal capital, unaware he was a noble. Anne-Marie deduces Leginbarth has not yet found and adopted Celestia, explaining why she is missing all the early story events. Meanwhile, Melody attends the same party with Lectias, who was ordered by his boss Leginbarth to find a date. To avoid embarrassing Luciana, Melody disguises herself with blonde hair and uses her birth name, Cecilia. Christopher and Anne-Marie are shocked by Maxwell escorting Luciana, as Maxwell was supposed to meet the heroine at the party and become a husband candidate. Leginbarth spots Melody and is instantly reminded of her mother, Selena, a feeling intensified when Melody uses the name "Cecilia", which he had wanted to give his own daughter. Despite the disguise, Luciana recognizes her. Fearing a scolding, Melody breaches etiquette by interrupting Leginbarth's sister Christina (Melody's aunt) to invite Lectias to dance, sparking Lectias's romantic feelings for her. Afterward, Melody tries to slip away to avoid Luciana. Unfortunately, the next dance is a "Same-sex Waltz", and Melody is caught and invited to dance by a furious Luciana.
4	"The Truth Beneath the Moonlight"; Transliteration: "Gekka no Shinjitsu" (Japanese: 月下の真実)	Ken Kiyota	Saeka Fujimoto	Naoya Murakawa	July 22, 2026
Anne-Marie and Christopher recall that the heroine's choice of dance partner alters the game: dancing with a friend boosts support, while an enemy eases gameplay. Crucially, a post-dance event requires the heroine's presence to prevent fatalities. During the dance, Luciana forgives Melody, whose excitement sparks magical lights until Luciana steps on her foot to hide them. Later in the garden, moonlight exposes Melody's silver hair, prompting Lectias to realize she is actually Celestia. As he is in love with Melody, he keeps her identity a secret from Leginbarth to protect her career as a maid. Melody casts a protective, intent-sensing spell on Luciana. Afterward, Maxwell reveals Luciana's embarrassing new nickname, "Fae Princess." The spell suddenly alerts Luciana that Duke Rincot'dor's daughter envies her, threatening her future school life. Maxwell introduces Luciana to Anne-Marie and Christopher, who are shocked to learn her dance partner was a "Cecilia." Suddenly, the expected crisis arrives: Bjork Quichel, manipulated by the Dark One, attempts to assassinate Christopher, but Luciana is injured in the attack instead.
5	"Sudden Seriousness"; Transliteration: "Shiriasu wa Totsuzen Ni" (Japanese: シリアスは突然に)	Kosaka Harume	Toshizō Nemoto	Shinji Ishihira	July 29, 2026
Christopher's narration reveals Bjork, a former slave-soldier manipulated by the Dark One, is the heroine's fourth love interest. Christopher summons a silver sword, Bjork's secret weakness, to fight him. During the battle, Bjork's corrupted Sword of the Saint inexplicably shatters against Luciana, who is somehow magically protected by the heroine, as are her parents. Abandoning Bjork, the fleeing Dark One possesses a Fenrir puppy to track the heroine. He finds Melody at Luciana's home and is stunned the heroine is working as a maid. As he made a mess breaking in, Melody mistakes him for a bad dog and easily captures him. Meanwhile, Anne-Marie realizes in the game Luciana was originally Tragic Girl, a miserable background character manipulated by the Dark One to attack the heroine, only to be killed when she fails. Before Anne-Marie can speculate further about how Luciana's role in the story has changed so dramatically, a city-wide sleeping spell takes effect. It is shown Melody is innocently singing a lullaby to Luciana and the Dark One, unaware her power is affecting the whole city. A flashback shows in her past life Melody played the game and felt sorry for Tragic Girl, whom she wished she could help find happiness.
6	"The House of Rudleberg's All-Works Maid"; Transliteration: "Rutorubāgu-ie no Ōru Wākusu Meido" (Japanese: ルトルバーグ家のオールワークスメイド)	Ken Kiyota	Toshizō Nemoto	Shinji Ishihira	August 5, 2026
Melody unwittingly purifies the Dark One's dark mana, the accumulated negative emotions of humanity, by bathing him with her magic. In a dream, a former Saint explains that this act defeated the Dark One, reduced monster appearances, and restored balance to the world, urging Melody to remain the Saint. Melody wakes up dismissing it as a ridiculous dream, believing a maid could never accomplish such a feat. Meanwhile, Melody regretfully repairs Luciana's dress after Bjork's attack, temporarily removing the protective spell she had placed on it. Luciana later names her newly acquired Fenrir "Grail." Suspecting Luciana might be a fellow reincarnation, Anne-Marie tests her using Japanese, but Luciana fails to recognize the language. Shifted suspicion leads Anne-Marie to Melody, the unexpected maid whose presence alters the original game's storyline. However, without active magic on the repaired dress, Anne-Marie dismisses the "spell" as a harmless luck charm. She soon realizes that her and Christopher's actions in opening a kingdom-wide carriage service was what enabled Melody to come to the city and meet Luciana, meaning the changes to the story was actually their fault. Rushing to interrogate Bjork, Anne-Marie discovers he has already escaped. Elsewhere, Luciana tries being a maid for a day, but her eagerness to serve tea backfires when she accidentally catches her parents in a romantic situation.
7	"Anna-Marie's Exciting Day-Off Date"; Transliteration: "Anne Marī no Dokidoki Kyūjitsu Dēto" (Japanese: アンネマリーのドキドキ休日デート)	Park Jong-Won	Saeka Fujimoto	Shinji Ishihira	August 12, 2026
While foraging in the Great Vanargand Woods again, Melody uses magic to clean a stone pedestal, which absorbs some of her power. Luciana insists Melody take a day off before they both move into the academy dormitory. Meanwhile, feeling guilty that her past actions prevented the heroine from appearing, Anne-Marie disguises herself as a commoner to visit town. Unexpectedly, the story's town date event triggers, forcing Anne-Marie to assume the role of Christopher and rescue the heroine (Melody) from thugs. Claiming to be a maid herself, Anne-Marie notices Melody has been present at every derailed game event so far. Fearing a bad ending, Anne-Marie continues the event as close to normal as possible by asking Melody on a date. Exploring town, Melody bypasses a quest item ring in favour of a doll resembling her mother. Anne-Marie buys the doll for her, along with another resembling the heroine, before visiting an orphanage Anne-Marie secretly saved three years prior. Though briefly suspecting Melody might be the missing heroine, Anne-Marie dismisses the idea. Melody later returns home with the important ring as a gift for Luciana. Anne-Marie ponders how to ensure a happy ending when the story has changed so dramatically. Meanwhile, one of the orphan girls urgently seeks employment.
8	"A New Encounter at the Royal Academy"; Transliteration: "Ōritsu Gakuen no Aratana Deai" (Japanese: 王立学園の新たな出会い)	Akira Shimizu	Saeka Fujimoto	Naoya Murakawa	August 19, 2026
In Japan, an elderly woman discusses the 50-year-old video game with her granddaughter Ritsuko, which has just been updated to show the heroine in a maid outfit. She soon passes away and reawakens as an orphan in the game world. Taken in by the orphanage, she seeks employment to prevent an impending tragedy that will befall the orphanage soon. Meanwhile, Luciana and Melody move into their student dormitory. Unable to afford additional help, Melody uses a stone pedestal fragment to enchant a doll resembling her mother, Selena, into a sentient maid-doll named Serena. Citing Melody's unpredictable magic, Luciana asks her to refrain from casting spells at the academy. Luciana becomes neighbours with Luna Invidia. Leginbarth remains fascinated by Luciana after the ball while thinking of "Cecilia", who reminds him of Selena. Disappointed to be separated from friends Beatrice and Milliaria, Luciana enters a separate class with Anna-Marie, Christopher, Luna, and jealous rival Olivia Rincot'dor. Her classmates judge her for being an impoverished noble, though homeroom teacher Regus insists there will be no discrimination in his classroom. Simultaneously, Melody faces discrimination from other servants due to Olivia's influence, finding allies only in Luna's maid Sasha, Sasha's cousin Blish, and their friend Warren.
9	"A Knight's Reunion and the Wavering Pride of a Maid"; Transliteration: "Saikai no Kishi to Yureru Meido Tamashī" (Japanese: 再会の騎士と揺れるメイド魂)	Hideki Takayama	Toshizō Nemoto	Shinji Ishihira	August 26, 2026
After placing third on midterms, Luciana meets Perriand and Lucif, the employers of Melody's new friends Blish and Warren. Protective of Melody, Luciana vows to target any man pursuing her, especially Lectias. She also notices Olivia's interest in Christopher. Deviating from the game's plot, Maxwell offers Luciana a vacant student council seat. When she refuses, a passed-over Olivia turns vengeful, prompting Anna-Marie to suspect Olivia is a surprise "mini-boss." Bored during the times Luciana is in class, Melody becomes an assistant-instructor for Lectias's Chivalry class to pass the time. Reflecting on her dream of being the "world's best maid", Melody seeks inspiration from Serena, whose pedestal fragment glows as she offers encouraging words that deeply comfort Melody as if they came directly from her mother. Luciana's parents hire the reincarnated orphan girl as a full-time maid. Luciana is disappointed she cannot take Advanced Arcane class due to her inability to use magic. However, Melody guides her in drawing out her mana, channelling magic into Luciana until she perceives it as a silver flower, a process sensed by the revenge-seeking Bjork. Afterward, Luciana discovers a silver flower crest appeared inside her ring Melody gave her. Upon returning home, the orphan girl is astounded to see Melody, the game's heroine, dressed as a maid.
10	"The Jealous Witch Incident"; Transliteration: "Shitto no Majo Jiken" (Japanese: 嫉妬の魔女事件)	Ken Kiyota	Toshizō Nemoto	Shinji Ishihira	September 2, 2026
The orphan girl, Micah, is baffled Luciana is a charming girl instead of the mid-game boss "Jealous Witch." Convinced the game's plot was altered, Micah asks Melody if she knows the game Silver Saint and the Five Oaths. Melody says no, revealing Anna-Maria previously asked her the exact same thing. Meanwhile, Bjork corrupts a student jealous of Luciana. Soon, Luciana's pencil and handkerchief disappear, followed by classroom vandalism where her pencil is discovered. Anna-Maria recognizes this as the first of three plot incidents meant to frame the heroine; classroom vandalism, the ransacking of commoner student's desks, and attacking Olivia with water. Because Luciana temporarily fills the heroine's role, Anna-Maria cannot identify who replaced the Jealous Witch. When commoners' desks are ransacked, Olivia points suspicion toward Luciana. Anna-Maria fails to hide Luciana's missing handkerchief planted at the scene, sparking rumours that Luciana bullies' rich commoners out of financial jealousy. Luciana's outraged parents demand the real culprit be found. Confused because the game originally cast Luciana as the Jealous Witch and Melody as the victim, Micah asks Luciana's father to enrol her in the academy to investigate the truth.
11	"The Choice the Ladies Make"; Transliteration: "Kanojo Tachi no Sentakushi" (Japanese: 彼女達の選択肢)	Kohei Takahashi	Toshizō Nemoto	Shinji Ishihira	September 9, 2026
Micah is shocked by the school's changes. Meanwhile, Lectias gives Melody the library's only beginner magic guide for Luciana. Anna-Marie recognizes Micah as a game character, while Micah spots Bjork, recognizing him as the man who took her to the orphanage. With the Dark One sealed by Melody, Bjork has begun regaining his senses and flees when Melody approaches. When Anna-Marie is attacked with water by the Jealous Witch, classmates immediately blame Luciana. Anna-Marie counters that Luciana lacks water magic, but Luna reveals Luciana recently learned it, allowing Olivia to turn everyone against her. Luciana admits to Melody she has no alibi because Luna left her alone to return the magic guide to the library. Melody realizes Luna must have lied as Melody has the only copy of that book. Suspecting Luna framed her, Luciana confronts her alone. Luna, who is secretly using the Dark One's power to control Bjork, admits her jealousy: ever since Luciana outperformed her at their debut, Luciana's life has improved while hers worsened. Driven by rage, Luna tries to kill Luciana. Luciana survives thanks to Melody's protective charm and decides to fight back. Micah visits Anna-Marie and Christopher, while Melody seeks help from Lectias.
12	"The World's Most Wonderful Maid"; Transliteration: "Sekaiichi Sutekina Meido" (Japanese: 世界一素敵なメイド)	Naoya Murakawa	Toshizō Nemoto	Shinji Ishihira	September 16, 2026
Anna-Marie, Christopher, Lectias, and Melody rush to find Luna and Luciana. Using the ring Melody gave her, Luciana summons a harisen fan and comically whacks Luna with it until the Dark One's power leaves her. Luna admits her rage was caused by the Dark One's power, but her jealousy of Luciana was real. Luciana reveals she is equally envious of Luna's intelligence, bravery, and joy. The Dark One's power transfers to Bjork, who flees and encounters Lectias. Recognizing this as the end of Bjork's story, Micah implores Lectias to disarm him. With Melody's help, Bjork drops the broken Saint Sword and collapses. Finding the sword pedestal in Vanargand Woods shattered, Melody reveals she took the pedestal mana to make Serena. Together, she and Serena completely remove the power from Bjork. Meanwhile, Grail retrieves his power from the Saint Sword but peacefully returns home to Luciana's mansion, hoping Melody never finds out he is the Dark One. Anna-Marie and Christopher present a story to Maxwell so confusing they officially decide to act as if it never happened, though Anna-Marie still hopes a Saint will appear someday. Bjork renames himself Rook, becoming a butler to Luciana's parents. Melody feels closer than ever to becoming the world's best maid, while Luciana's retired former maid visits, delighted to see Luciana surrounded by people who love her.

== See also ==
- The Strongest Job Is Apparently Not a Hero or a Sage, but an Appraiser (Provisional)!, another light novel series with the same writer
