= The Daughter of the Demon Lord Is Too Kind! =

Japanese manga series

- First tankōbon volume cover, featuring Doux (top) and Jahi (bottom)

魔王の娘は優しすぎる!! (Maō no Musume wa Yasashi Sugiru!!)
- Genre: Fantasy comedy, Slice of life
- Manga
- Written by: Yūya Sakamoto
- Published by: Hakusensha
- English publisher: NA: Yen Press
- Imprint: Young Animal Comics
- Magazine: Manga Park
- Original run: May 16, 2019 – November 17, 2025
- Volumes: 7
- Anime television series

The Demon King's Daughter Is Too Kind!!
- Directed by: Masahiko Ohta
- Written by: Takashi Aoshima
- Music by: Yasuhiro Misawa
- Studio: EMT Squared
- Licensed by: Crunchyroll
- Original network: Tokyo MX, BS Fuji, AT-X
- Original run: January 7, 2026 – March 25, 2026
- Episodes: 12
- icon

The Daughter of the Demon Lord Is Too Kind! (魔王の娘は優しすぎる!!, Maō no Musume wa Yasashi Sugiru!!) is a Japanese manga series written and illustrated by Yūya Sakamoto. It was serialized on Hakusensha's Manga Park service from May 2019 to November 2025, and was compiled into seven tankōbon volumes. An anime television series adaptation produced by EMT Squared aired from January to March 2026.

== Plot ==
The Demon King Ahriman, once the ruler of the demon realm and conqueror of countless worlds, halts his campaigns—troubled by a problem:he thinks his daughter,Doux, is too kindhearted. Determined to turn her into a ruthless and fearsome demon worthy of the throne, his aide Jahi steps up with a plan. Thus begins a comedic fantasy, where the demon girl Doux faces one trial after another,only to solve each one with the power of kindness and healing.

== Characters ==
Doux (ドゥ, Du)
Voiced by: Misaki Kuno
The eponymous daughter of Demon King Ahriman. She is a demon child that Jahi needs to train to become a proper Demon.
Jahi (ジャヒー, Jahī)
Voiced by: Ayaka Ōhashi
Demon King Ahriman's secretary, and in charge of training Doux to be a proper Demon.
Ahriman (アーリマン, Āriman)
Voiced by: Akio Otsuka
The Demon King. He is a doting father to Doux.
Sati (サティ)
Voiced by: Ayasa Itō
A youthful succubus who teaches pranks to Doux.
Melina (メリーナ, Merīna)
Voiced by: Kaori Ishihara
Mayu (マーユ, Māyu)
Voiced by: Yūko Sanpei

== Media ==
=== Manga ===
Written and illustrated by Yūya Sakamoto, The Daughter of the Demon Lord Is Too Kind! was serialized on Hakusensha's Manga Park service from May 16, 2019, to November 17, 2025. Its chapters were compiled into seven tankōbon volumes released from October 29, 2019, to December 25, 2025.

In December 2025, Yen Press announced that they had licensed the series for English publication beginning in June 2026.

No.	Original release date	Original ISBN	English release date	English ISBN
1	October 29, 2019	978-4-592-16421-0	June 23, 2026	979-8-8554-1803-3
2	October 29, 2020	978-4-592-16422-7	April 27, 2027	979-8-8554-1805-7
3	October 29, 2021	978-4-592-16423-4	—	—
4	December 27, 2023	978-4-592-16424-1	—	—
5	August 29, 2024	978-4-592-16425-8	—	—
6	June 27, 2025	978-4-592-16675-7	—	—
7	December 25, 2025	978-4-592-16695-5	—	—

=== Anime ===
An anime television series adaptation was announced on June 20, 2025. It is produced by EMT Squared and directed by Masahiko Ohta, with the series narrated by Shigeru Chiba, series composition handled by Takashi Aoshima, characters designed by Yūki Nakano, and music composed by Yasuhiro Misawa. The series aired from January 7 to March 25, 2026, on Tokyo MX and other networks. The opening theme song is "We Can Do", performed by Kaori Ishihara, while the ending theme song, "Ikko Nikoniko", is performed by Misaki Kuno, Ayaka Ōhashi, and Akio Otsuka as their respective characters. Crunchyroll is streaming the series under the title The Demon King's Daughter Is Too Kind!!.

==== Episodes ====
No.	Title	Directed by (Note: Production staff information is taken from the ending credits of each episode.)	Written by	Storyboarded by	Original release date
1	"The Demon King's Daughter Is Too Kind!!"; Transliteration: "Maō no Musume wa Yasashi Sugiru!!" (Japanese: 魔王の娘は優しすぎる!!)	Masahiko Ōta	Takashi Aoshima	Masahiko Ōta	January 7, 2026 (Note: Episode 1 was released on DMM, dAnimeStore and Crunchyroll 1 day before the televised airing.)
1	"The Demon King's Daughter Helps Too Much!!"; Transliteration: "Maō no Musume wa Otetsudai ga Sugiru!!" (Japanese: 魔王の娘はお手伝いがすぎる!!)	Masahiko Ōta	Takashi Aoshima	Masahiko Ōta	January 7, 2026
Demon King Ahriman suddenly ends his war against Heaven and the Human World. His subordinate Jahi learns Ahriman cannot focus on war because of his daughter Doux, who is far too kind. Jahi is certain this is because Ahriman spoils her, so she decides to train Doux to torture humans. She urges Doux to steal food from humans but shopkeeper Grammy finds her so cute she thinks Doux is playing a game. Ahriman is confused when Doux visits Grammy regularly so Jahi quickly claims they are gaining Grammy's trust so they can betray her later. Ahriman shows Doux a spell to control other people, hoping to awaken her ruthlessness, but Doux uses it to get hugs from Jahi. Grammy tries to give Doux dolls that once belonged to her children and grandchildren but Doux uses the spell to awaken souls in the dolls. The dolls ask to stay with Grammy, who has loved them for decades. Having failed entirely Jahi decides to quit, but still being under the effect of Doux's spell she is forced to agree when Doux asks her to play the next day, and every day after.
2	"The Demon King's Daughter Must Shrewdly Oppress the Humans!!"; Transliteration: "Maō no Musume wa Ningen o Shītake Sugiru!!" (Japanese: 魔王の娘は人間をしいたけすぎる!!)	Geisei Morita	Kenji Sugihara	Takaharu Ōkuma	January 14, 2026 (Note: From Episode 2, episodes are released on DMM, dAnimeStore and Crunchyroll 8 days before their televised airings.)
2	"The Demon King's Advisor Teaches Too Well!!"; Transliteration: "Maō no Sokkin wa Kyōiku ga Sugiru!!" (Japanese: 魔王の側近は教育がすぎる!!)	Geisei Morita	Kenji Sugihara	Takaharu Ōkuma	January 14, 2026
Jahi hopes to have Doux oppress Assim, a troublesome slave and demon hunter. Ahriman gives Doux a magic staff that turns anyone with evil intent into dust if they touch her. Doux meets Assim but mixes up "must shrewdly oppress" and "grill him" to mean she should cook grilled mushrooms. Assim's flashback shows he killed the demons that murdered his family but their blood burned his skin with the demon hunter curse. Doux reveals she often feels lonely when Ahriman and Jahi are working. Assim is reminded of his own daughter, so he strokes Doux's cheek and his curse is mysteriously lifted. Doux hugs Jahi who is confused why she did not turn to dust. Winter arrives and Doux's desire to throw snowballs gives Jahi the idea to teach her attack magic. Ahriman feeds Doux Dark Matter, to increase her magic power. Doux announces she wants to use ice magic on the slaves, giving Jahi hope Doux has learned ruthlessness. Unfortunately, Doux only wanted to use ice magic to cool down the mines where the slaves are working in constant heat. Ahriman praises Doux for her creative idea and they end up playing in the snow with the slave children while Jahi sulks in the corner.
3	"Searching for a Familiar is Too Difficult"; Transliteration: "Tsukaima Sagashi wa Taihen Sugiru!!" (Japanese: 使い魔探しは大変すぎる!!)	Shunji Yoshida	Yasunori Yamada	Hiroaki Shimura	January 21, 2026
3	"The Pairika is Too Sexy"; Transliteration: "Parikā ga Sekushi Sugiru!!" (Japanese: 誘惑の魔女(パリカー)がせくしーすぎる!!)	Shunji Yoshida	Yasunori Yamada	Hiroaki Shimura	January 21, 2026
With Doux having adopted a small lizard Jahi decides to find her a familiar. They encounter an injured female dragon enslaved by Pishachas, immortal shadow demons. Doux heals the dragon then, thinking they are ill, heals the Pishachas, turning them into harmless slimes. The dragon, Salamandra, reveals Doux's lizard is her missing son. Jahi suggests making Salamandra Doux's familiar, but Doux suggests they become family instead. Jahi is certain Ahriman will be disappointed, but Ahriman throws a party celebrating Doux earning the loyalty of two dragons. A suspicious demon is captured but resists all attempts to torture him for information. Doux becomes friends with Jahi's rival, prankster Thaiti of the Pairika Seduction Witches. Thaiti tries to seduce the demon but he mocks her child-like body. Jahi tries to use her much larger bust as a seduction tool and it almost works, until she panics and punches him instead. Thaiti admits her body is unsuitable for seduction and the other Pairika bully her, so she prefers to play pranks instead. Doux mistakes seduction for pranks, so she tickles the demon until he confesses to painting anti-Ahriman graffiti on the castle wall. Jahi is furious Thaiti claims credit for Doux's success as it was she who taught Doux how to play pranks.
4	"Santa Is Handing Out Too Many Presents!!"; Transliteration: "Santa ga Purezento o Kubari Sugiru!!" (Japanese: サンタがプレゼントを配りすぎる!!)	Noriyo Sasaki	Takamitsu Kōno	Shōgo Arai & Takaharu Ōkuma	January 28, 2026
4	"The Demon King's Familiar Loves Humans Too Much!!"; Transliteration: "Maō no Tsukai ma wa Ningen ga Suki Sugiru!!" (Japanese: 魔王の使い魔は人間が好きすぎる!!)	Noriyo Sasaki	Takamitsu Kōno	Shōgo Arai & Takaharu Ōkuma	January 28, 2026
Doux learns about Christmas and helps slave children write letters to Santa. Hearing Santa grants wishes Jahi decides to capture him. Santa, a girl named Merryna, puts everyone to sleep with her Christmas Bell but she and her gnome Tontt are caught by Doux, who somehow stayed awake. Doux learns Tontt's were a mischievous demon species, but when one of them was saved by a good child they all became Santa, and work together delivering presents one night a year. Merryna decides to give Doux a gift, but Doux already got hers since her letter asked if she could help deliver presents. Jahi is devastated she could not capture Santa while Ahriman is surprised Santa is a demon. Doux asks to learn to cook and makes sandwiches. Jahi suggests feeding Ahriman's familiar, Druj, with slaves injured in a mine collapse, since Druj was created to eat wounded on the battlefield and can not eat anything else. Doux heals the slave anyway and feeds Druj one of her sandwiches. Jahi is astounded Doux deliberately filled the sandwich with mana so Druj could eat it. Druj is so happy he even helps fix the collapsed mine, becoming popular with the slaves. Jahi becomes depressed while Ahriman accepts Doux did something amazing again.
5	"The Divine Messenger Is Too Much Trouble!!"; Transliteration: "Kami no Tsukai ga Meiwaku Sugiru!!" (Japanese: 神の使いが迷惑すぎる!!)	Yū Yabūchi	Kenji Sugihara	Erika Okamoto	February 4, 2026
5	"The Divine Messenger (The Real One) Is Too Hot-Headed!!"; Transliteration: "Kami no Tsukai (Shin) wa Chinoke ga Ōsugiru!!" (Japanese: 神の使い（真）は血の気が多すぎる!!)	Yū Yabūchi	Kenji Sugihara	Erika Okamoto	February 4, 2026
Jahi decides to have Doux give poisoned apples to humans, hoping to awaken her sadism. They discover the village being threatened by Aeshma, a monster pretending to be a divine messenger so he can take all their food. Deciding Aeshma is mean because he is hungry, Doux gives him the apples, making him violently ill before Jahi defeats him. The villagers hail them as heroes, to Jahi's disgust. Despite Doux failing to be sadistic, Ahriman is satisfied another human village is now loyal to him. Genuine divine messengers arrive to rescue the village but learn the villagers actually like being ruled by Ahriman. Angel Mayu loses his temper and forcibly moves all the villagers outside Ahriman's territory. Mayu decides to eliminate Ahriman himself. However, he meets Doux and tries to eliminate her, but misses thanks to Doux chasing a butterfly. He insists angels should fight demons, but Doux surprisingly claims making friends is a lot harder than fighting. He decides one day he will be King of Heaven so that when Doux becomes Queen of the Demons they can make everyone be friends. Jahi is furious Doux draws a picture of herself and Mayu as a gift for Ahriman, but Ahriman is so happy to receive a gift from Doux he overlooks Mayu being in the picture.
6	"The Demon King's Daughter Is Trying to Change Her Image Too Much!!"; Transliteration: "Maō no Musume ga Imechenchi Sugiru!!" (Japanese: 魔王の娘がイメチェンしすぎる!!)	Hideki Tonokatsu	Yasunori Yamada	Masakazu Amiya	February 11, 2026
6	"XXX Is Too Perfect a Job for a Pairika!!"; Transliteration: "○△× Kakeru wa Parikā no Tenshoku Sugiru!!" (Japanese: ○△×は誘惑の魔女(パリカー)の天職すぎる!!)	Hideki Tonokatsu	Yasunori Yamada	Masakazu Amiya	February 11, 2026
Jahi decides to teach Doux a transformation spell to look scarier but Doux only ends up looking like a cute mascot character. Desperate, Jahi uses a Flower of Transfiguration, but Doux only grows into a larger version of her cute mascot self. Rather than scare the human slaves Doux uses her giant size to protect them from falling boulders. She later cries in front of Jahi, who is proud Doux hid her pain to not seem weak, and Doux soon stops crying. Ahriman however is traumatised at the bruise on Doux' head. Deciding she needs a different job, Thaiti challenges Jahi for her position as Royal Attendant. Jahi agrees, but only if the loser never talks to Doux again. Ahriman assigns them a challenge to do household chores. Jahi proves superior at cleaning, laundry, sewing and DIY. Unfortunately, Thaiti proves to be a better cook and Jahi fears this will convince Doux to replace her. Doux refuses to pick as she has no idea what an attendant is and wants both Jahi and Thaiti to be her big sisters. Ahriman declares the challenge a tie. Soon after, Thaiti gets a job as a chef in the castle cafeteria.
7	"The Monsters of Terror Look Too Ugly!!"; Transliteration: "Kyōfu no Kaibutsu ga Miniku Sugiru!!" (Japanese: 恐怖の怪物がみにくすぎる!!)	Shunji Yoshida	Takashi Aoshima	Masahiko Ōta & Takaharu Ōkuma	February 18, 2026
7	"The Spirit Tower Is Just Too Exciting!!"; Transliteration: "Reikairō wa Wakuwaku Sugiru!!" (Japanese: 霊怪楼はワクワクすぎる!!)	Shunji Yoshida	Takashi Aoshima	Masahiko Ōta & Takaharu Ōkuma	February 18, 2026
7	"The Demon King's Attendant Thinks Too Much!!"; Transliteration: "Maō no Sokkin wa Kangae Sugiru!!" (Japanese: 魔王の側近は考えすぎる!!)	Shunji Yoshida	Takashi Aoshima	Masahiko Ōta & Takaharu Ōkuma	February 18, 2026
Gorgons Gauche and Urun move into the forest, worrying Jahi for Doux' safety as their appearance causes traumatising fear. Gauche and Urun try to scare Doux, but she is impressed and asks how to be scary. They soon become friends as Doux was the first person not scared by their ugliness. Doux admits she needs to be scary so Jahi can be happy. Gauche and Urun realise they are lonely, so Doux invites them to the castle to play. Soon everyone is having a good time scaring each other. Jahi realises Doux is already an amazing demon without being scary. Ahriman takes Doux and Jahi to the Spirit Tower, a hotel between dimensions where beings from multiple worlds interact. Ahriman insists it is vital for Doux' training, but Jahi suspects they are just on vacation. Doux becomes lost and spends time helping people before Jahi finds her. Together they locate Ahriman who admits they really are on a family vacation. Jahi decides vacations are not that bad after all. Jahi considers changing her hairstyle but panics at what Thaiti, Ahriman or Doux might think if she did. After worrying about it all night, she keeps her hair exactly the same as before.
8	"The Demon King's Attendant Is Too Depressed!!"; Transliteration: "Maō no Sokkin ga Ochikomi Sugiru!!" (Japanese: 魔王の側近が落ち込みすぎる!!)	Yuki Nishibata	Takamitsu Kōno	Yuki Nishibata	February 25, 2026
8	"The Demon King's Attendant Is Too Tired!!"; Transliteration: "Maō no Sokkin wa o Tsukare Sugiru!!" (Japanese: 魔王の側近はお疲れすぎる!!)	Yuki Nishibata	Takamitsu Kōno	Yuki Nishibata	February 25, 2026
Jahi becomes depressed after failing to master a magic staff called Ooparts, which is then stolen by the demon Akoman. Doux decides to steal Ooparts back for Jahi but after failing spectacularly Akoman insists it is pointless for Jahi to have Ooparts as only demons over 500 years old can use it. Doux makes Jahi feel better by giving her a secret treasure, a magic stone she found in the mines. Ahriman apologises for foolishly giving Jahi a weapon she could not use, so instead he uses the stone to make a staff even more powerful than Ooparts for Jahi to share with Doux. Jahi passes out from overwork so Doux insists she stay in bed and let her be her nurse, but Doux falls asleep while reading Jahi a bedtime story. Ahriman agrees Jahi needs rest and personally makes porridge for her, which Jahi shares with Doux. Ahriman also admits that, having attempted to do Jahi's job while she was asleep, Jahi has too many responsibilities so he has delegated some tasks to other officials to give her a break. Jahi decides the one job she cannot let go of is teaching Doux.
9	"The Previous Demon King Is Too Scary!!"; Transliteration: "Sendai Maō ga kowa Sugiru!!" (Japanese: 先代魔王が怖すぎる!!)	Shigeru Ueda	Kenji Sugihara	Hiroaki Shimura	March 4, 2026
9	"The Previous Demon King Is Too Much Of A Doting Grandpa!!"; Transliteration: "Sendai Maō ga Jijibaka sugiru!!" (Japanese: 先代魔王がジジバカすぎる!!)	Shigeru Ueda	Kenji Sugihara	Hiroaki Shimura	March 4, 2026
Ahriman's father, Zareth, turns 10,000 years old and requests a celebration. Ahriman fears if he realises Doux is kind his rage could destroy the world. Jahi takes Doux to watch demons being evil, but somehow Doux turns every evil plan in to a game. Jahi even takes her to Lady Setia, a mermaid who enchants humans to drown themselves. Doux copies the song but it is so relaxing even Setia becomes a nice person. Zareth arrives early. Zareth, the King of Destruction, plans to turn Doux into a fearsome demon queen. This turns out to be quite difficult as Zareth is actually a doting grandfather and has to fight the temptation to spoil Doux. After forbidding all Doux's favourite games he resists the urge to comfort her when she cries. No one enjoys the birthday with Doux upset but Zareth convinces himself he is doing what is right. He visits Doux's room and finds she made lots of handmade gifts for him and has agreed to stop having fun if Zareth visits more often. Pushed to his limit, Zareth begs Doux's forgiveness and lets her play any games she wants. Jahi and Ahriman are shocked Zareth, the Unstoppable Calamity, is happy playing children's games with his granddaughter.
10	"The Witches' Potions Work Way Too Good!!"; Transliteration: "Majo no Kusuri ga Kiki Sugiru!!" (Japanese: 魔女の薬が効きすぎる!!)	Yū Yabūchi	Takamitsu Kōno	Masatoshi Chioka	March 11, 2026
10	"The Hero Is Just Too Unreliable!!"; Transliteration: "Yūsha ga Tayorina Sasugiru!!" (Japanese: 勇者が頼りなさすぎる!!)	Yū Yabūchi	Takamitsu Kōno	Masatoshi Chioka	March 11, 2026
First witch Yairya sends Jahi to junior witch Mus for potions that might turn Doux evil. As they are experimental the potions have bizarre effects, including multiplying Doux and making her horns rainbow coloured. Mus decides she must be the most useless witch ever. Doux assures her all the transforming was fun and helps her ask Yairya for proper training. Yairya discovers one of Mus' failed potions actually cures the entire castles fatigue and insists on seeing all her other failed potions in case they have interesting effects. Amateur Hero Ur raids a dungeon but encounters Doux. Checking her "How to Be a Hero" booklet Ur tries to help Doux to safety but keep encountering monsters. They encounter the dragon that separated Ur from her friends. She decides to forget her booklet and protect Doux, but Doux simply plucks a branch that was stuck in the dragon's mouth making it grumpy. Ur realises she does not need the booklet to be a hero. Ahriman appears, having accidentally lost Doux by the dungeon entrance. For protecting Doux, Ahriman offers to let Ur attack him for free, but she and her friends flee instead.
11	"The Demon King's Wife Loves Her Daughter Too Much!!"; Transliteration: "Maō no Yome wa Musume ga Suki Sugiru!!" (Japanese: 魔王の嫁は娘が好きすぎる!!)	Park Jong-Won	Yasunori Yamada	Kenichi Hamazaki & Masahiko Ōta	March 18, 2026
11	"The Face Reveal Ceremony Is Too Soon!!"; Transliteration: "Kao Mise no gi ga Mōsugu Sugiru!!" (Japanese: 顔見せの儀がもうすぐすぎる!!)	Park Jong-Won	Yasunori Yamada	Kenichi Hamazaki & Masahiko Ōta	March 18, 2026
Doux's loving mother, Dahaka the Dragon of Domination, returns from her failed world conquest. Unfortunately, Doux does not remember her and Dahaka's misery causes a storm over the castle. Ahriman guiltily admits to Jahi that when he first met Dahaka she had two personalities; one evil and one good. Wanting her evil personality for his army he split these personalities into two people; Dahaka the evil and Doux the good. Ahriman decided to raise Doux but Dahaka was obsessed with world domination and eventually left, a decision she now regrets. Sensing Dahaka is upset, Doux takes her favourite bedtime story to read together, causing her to remember Dahaka reading it to her before, making Dahaka very happy. The Face Reveal Ceremony arrives, where the Demon King's heir is publicly revealed to the world. Ahriman and Jahi both fret Doux is not ready but Dahaka calms them down and sends them to follow Doux all day. After seeing Doux interact with everyone she has met so far and spreading happiness to all of them, Ahriman realizes Doux is more than ready for the Reveal Ceremony as everyone who will be there are already Doux's friends. Jahi remains unconvinced this is appropriate for the heir of a Demon King.
12	"The Face Reveal Ceremony Is Too Lively!!"; Transliteration: "Kaomise no Gi ga Nigiyaka Sugiru!!" (Japanese: 顔見せの儀が賑やかすぎる!!)	Masahiko Ōta & Ippei Ichii	Takashi Aoshima	Masahiko Ōta & Hiroaki Shimura	March 25, 2026
12	"The Future Demon King Is Too Kind!!"; Transliteration: "Mirai no Maō wa Yasashi Sugiru!!" (Japanese: 未来の魔王は優しすぎる!!)	Masahiko Ōta & Ippei Ichii	Takashi Aoshima	Masahiko Ōta & Hiroaki Shimura	March 25, 2026
Jahi considers swapping the speech Doux wrote herself with a more demonic-sounding one. She changes her mind on learning Doux has a diary of every lesson Jahi taught her. At the ceremony Doux declares she will conquer the world to make it a better place for everyone. Jahi realizes she focused too much on trying to turn Doux into the ideal demon, when she should have been supporting who she is, so she decides to continue teaching her. Ahriman declares Doux will be Demon King for a day. Doux punishes captured rebels by sending them to bed and stops the Generals' arguing by sending them on missions with snacks. In Jet Black Forest an infant giant is found alone and scared. Since Ahriman's translation spell does not work on the giant language Doux tries the spell on a ladybug, who informs them the giant was separated from his parents. Doux explains since the spell does not work on giants she cast it on every living thing nearby to ask for help. The trees reveal the parents are to the northeast and the mushrooms point the way until the boy is reunited with his family. Ahriman negotiates an alliance with the giants and Jahi wonders how else Doux's kindness will change the demon world. God Ahura Mazda decides kindness like Doux's could be dangerous if manipulated by demons, so he demands she be brought to live in Heaven immediately.

== Reception ==
Anime Hack praised the anime series for its premise and adding that the "character design is cute, and the drawing and directing are careful".
