= A Destructive God Sits Next to Me =

Japanese manga series

- Cover of Boku no Tonari ni Ankoku Hakaishin ga Imasu. volume 1 by Media Factory

ぼくのとなりに暗黒破壊神がいます。 (Boku no Tonari ni Ankoku Hakaishin ga Imasu.)
- Genre: Comedy
- Manga
- Written by: Arata Aki
- Published by: Media Factory
- Magazine: Monthly Comic Gene
- Original run: January 2013 – April 2020
- Volumes: 12
- Anime television series
- Directed by: Atsushi Nigorikawa
- Written by: Natsuko Takahashi
- Music by: Kanako Hara
- Studio: EMT Squared
- Licensed by: Crunchyroll
- Original network: AT-X, Tokyo MX, BS Fuji
- English network: SEA: Animax Asia
- Original run: January 11, 2020 – March 28, 2020
- Episodes: 12

A Destructive God Sits Next to Me (ぼくのとなりに暗黒破壊神がいます。, Boku no Tonari ni Ankoku Hakaishin ga Imasu.) is a Japanese manga series by Arata Aki. It was serialized in Media Factory's shōjo manga magazine Monthly Comic Gene from January 2013 to April 2020, and was collected in twelve tankōbon volumes. An anime television series adaptation by EMT Squared premiered from January 11 to March 28, 2020.

== Characters ==
Seri Koyuki (小雪芹, Koyuki Seri)
Voiced by: Jun Fukuyama (drama CD, anime)
Kabuto Hanatori (花鳥兜, Hanatori Kabuto)
Voiced by: Takahiro Sakurai (drama CD, anime)
Utsugi Tsukimiya (月宮ウツギ, Tsukimiya Utsugi)
Voiced by: Ryōhei Kimura (drama CD, anime)
Hibiki Kimiya (君屋ひびき, Kimiya Hibiki)
Voiced by: Tsubasa Yonaga (drama CD, anime)
Kimikage Mogami (最上君影, Mogami Kimikage)
Voiced by: Shinnosuke Tachibana (drama CD, anime)
Shikimi Tokimune (時宗樒, Tokimune Shikimi)
Voiced by: Kohsuke Toriumi (drama CD, anime)
Kotoko Sumiso (澄楚琴子, Kotoko Sumiso)
Voiced by: Ai Kayano (drama CD, anime)
Suzuran Mogami (最上鈴蘭, Mogami Suzuran)
Voiced by: Yoshiko Ikuta (drama CD, anime)
Aitsu (相津)
Voiced by: Toshiki Masuda (drama CD, anime)
Homeroom Teacher (担任の先生)
Voiced by: Takayuki Kondō (drama CD, anime)
Cerberus (八重)
Voiced by: Chinatsu Akasaki (drama CD, anime)
Gorio (ゴリ男)
Voiced by: Takaya Kuroda (anime)
Chikako (ちかこ)
Voiced by: Yui Ogura (anime)

== Media ==
=== Anime ===
An anime television series adaptation was announced in the October issue of Monthly Comic Gene magazine on September 15, 2018. The series is animated by EMT Squared and directed by Atsushi Nigorikawa, with Natsuko Takahashi handling series composition, Yuki Nakano designing the characters, and Kanako Hara composing the music. It premiered from January 11 to March 28, 2020, on AT-X, Tokyo MX, and BS Fuji, and is streamed by Crunchyroll. All at Once performed the series's opening theme song "Take mo' Chance", while AŌP performed the series' ending theme song "Freedom de Muda ni Muteki!!" (FREEDOMでムダに無敵!!). The series ran for 12 episodes.

No.	Title	Original release date
1	"Darlin' from Hell"	January 11, 2020
2	"Eyes on Me"	January 18, 2020
3	"Death Wish"	January 25, 2020
4	"Travel Rock"	February 1, 2020
5	"Ghost of My Dream"	February 8, 2020
6	"Brilliant Destiny"	February 15, 2020
7	"Blurry Eyes"	February 22, 2020
8	"SWEET HEART MEMORY"	February 29, 2020
9	"So Merry Christmas"	March 7, 2020
10	"Happy Happy Greeting"	March 14, 2020
11	"In the Future"	March 21, 2020
12	"Secret Room"	March 28, 2020

== Reception ==
The manga has over 460,000 copies in print.
