= The Food Diary of Miss Maid =

Japanese manga series

- First tankōbon volume cover, featuring Suzume Tachibana

メイドさんは食べるだけ (Meido-san wa Taberu dake)
- Genre: Comedy; Gourmet; Slice of life
- Manga
- Written by: Susumu Maeya
- Published by: Kodansha
- English publisher: NA: Kodansha USA (digital)
- Imprint: Evening KC
- Magazine: Comic Days
- Original run: December 2, 2019 – present
- Volumes: 5
- Anime television series
- Directed by: Ryousuke Senbo
- Written by: Natsuko Takahashi; Saeka Fujimoto
- Music by: Katsutoshi Kitagawa
- Studio: EMT Squared; Magic Bus
- Licensed by: Crunchyroll
- Original network: Tokyo MX, ytv, BS Asahi, AT-X
- Original run: April 5, 2026 – June 21, 2026
- Episodes: 12
- icon

The Food Diary of Miss Maid (Japanese: メイドさんは食べるだけ, Hepburn: Meido-san wa Taberu dake) is a Japanese manga series written and illustrated by Susumu Maeya. It has been serialized on Kodansha's Comic Days digital platform since December 2019. An anime television series adaptation produced by EMT Squared and Magic Bus aired from April to June 2026.

== Plot ==
Suzume Tachibana works as a maid at a British mansion. While visiting Japan for the first time since she was a child, her employer tells her that the mansion was damaged during building works, and encourages her to stay in Japan while it is being repaired. Living in a small apartment for a year, she explores Japanese food and culture along with her grandparents and friends from the neighborhood.

== Characters ==
Suzume Tachibana (橘 スズメ, Tachibana Suzume)
Voiced by: Kana Ichinose
Ricotta Fresca (リコッタ・フレスカ, Rikotta Furesuka)
Voiced by: Chihiro Sunou
Nana Komatsu (小松 菜々, Komatsu Nana)
Voiced by: Maki Kawase
Sora Endo (遠藤そら, Endō Sora)
Voiced by: Shizuka Ishigami
Anzu Shingetsu (信月杏, Shingetsu Anzu)
Voiced by: Hiromi Igarashi
Chun (チュン)
Voiced by: Daisuke Sakuma

== Media ==
=== Manga ===
Written and illustrated by Susumu Maeya, The Food Diary of Miss Maid started on Kodansha's Comic Days digital platform on December 2, 2019. Kodansha has collected its chapters into individual tankōbon volumes, with the first volume released on August 11, 2020. As of November 12, 2025, five volumes have been released.

In North America, the manga is licensed for English digital release by Kodansha USA.

==== Volumes ====
No.	Original release date	Original ISBN	English release date	English ISBN
1	August 11, 2020	978-4-06-520481-8	November 29, 2022	978-1-68491-363-3
1. "Taiyaki" (たい焼き); 2. "Takoyaki" (たこ焼き); 3. "Dango" (お団子, Odango); 4. "Convenience Store Onigiri" (コンビニおにぎり, Konbini Onigiri); 5. "Baumkuchen" (バウムクーヘン, Baumukūhen); 6. "Ice Cream" (アイスクリーム, Aisu Kurīmu); 7. "Tian-cha" (甜茶, Tencha); 8. "Melon Bread" (メロンパン, Meronpan); 9. "Shingen Mochi" (信玄餅); Bonus: "Wayside Plants" (道草, Michikusa)
2	January 13, 2021	978-4-06-521821-1	December 27, 2022	978-1-68491-405-0
10. "Side Dish" (惣菜, Sōzai); 11. "Instant Curry" (レトルトカレー, Retorutokarē); 12. "Fava Beans" (そら豆, Soramame); 13. "Pickles" (漬物, Tsukemono); 14. "Bolo" (ボーロ, Boro); 15. "Sports Drink" (スポーツ飲料, Supōtsu Inryō); 16. "Biscuit" (ビスケット, Bisuketto); 17. "Anpan" (あんぱん); 18. "Lemonade" (レモネード, Remonēdo); 19. "Fried Chicken" (フライドチキン, Furaido Chikin); 19.5 "Futon" (おふとん, Ofuton); Bonus: "Strawberry" (いちご, Ichigo)
3	August 11, 2021	978-4-06-523873-8	January 24, 2023	978-1-68491-654-2
20. "Soft Serve" (ソフトクリーム, Sofuto Kurīmu); 21. "Plum Wine" (梅酒, Umeshu); 22. "Barley Tea" (麦茶, Mugicha); 23. "Crepe" (クレープ, Kurēpu); 24. "Raw Egg Over Rice" (卵かけご飯, Tamago Kake Gohan); 25. "Shaved Ice" (かき氷, Kakigōri); 26. "Cheesecake" (チーズケーキ, Chīzukēki); 27. "Eel" (うなぎ, Unagi); 28. "Hiyayakko" (冷奴); 29. "Festival (Part 1)" (お祭り (前編), Omatsuri (Zenpen)); 30. "Festival (Part 2)" (お祭り (後編), Omatsuri (Kōhen)); 30.5 "Bath Cleaning" (お風呂そうじ, Ofuro Sōji)
4	March 9, 2022	978-4-06-527369-2	February 28, 2023	978-1-68491-714-3
31. "Plain Hot Water" (白湯, Sayu); 32. "New Rice" (新米, Shin Kome); 23. "Cup Noodles" (カップラーメン, Kappurāmen); 34. "Curry" (カレー, Karē); 35. "Baked Sweet Potato" (焼き芋, Yakiimo); 36. "Grape" (ぶどう, Budō); 37. "Ginkgo" (銀杏, Ichō); 38. "Halloween" (ハロウィン, Harowin); 39. "Miso Soup" (味噌汁, Miso-shiru); 40. "Corn Soup" (コーンスープ, Kōn Sūpu); 41. "Hiking" (山登り, Yamanobori)
5	November 12, 2025	978-4-06-541641-9	May 5, 2026	979-8-89830-099-9
42. "Mandarin Orange" (みかん, Mikan); 43. "Gyoza" (ぎょうざ, Gyōza); 44. "Meat Bun" (肉まん, Nikuman); 45. "Chitose Ame" (千(ち)歳(とせ)飴(あめ)); 46. "Stollen" (シュトレン, Shutoren); 47. "Dried Daikon" (干し大根, Hoshi Daikon); 48. "Yuzu" (柚(ゆ)子(ず)); 49. "Persimmon" (柿, Kaki); 50. "Christmas Cake" (クリスマスケーキ, Kurisumasu Kēki); 51. "Packaged Noodles" (袋麺, Fukuromen); 52. "New Year's Eve Soba" (年越しそば, Toshikoshi Soba)

=== Anime ===
An anime television series adaptation was announced by Happinet on August 25, 2025. It is produced by EMT Squared and Magic Bus, and directed by Ryōsuke Senbo, with series composition by Natsuko Takahashi and Saeka Fujimoto, characters designed by Chiaki Abe, and music composed by Katsutoshi Kitagawa. The series aired from April 5 to June 21, 2026, on Tokyo MX and other networks. (Note: The first episode was released on Abema, D Anime Store, and Crunchyroll four days before its televised airing.) The opening theme song is "Ribbon" (リボン, Ribon), performed by Majiko, while the ending theme song is "Shiawase Flavor" (しあわせフレーバー, Shiawase Furēbā; lit. 'Happiness Flavor'), performed by Arcana Project. Crunchyroll is streaming the series.

==== Episodes ====
No.	Title	Directed by	Written by	Storyboarded by	Original release date
1	"Taiyaki" (Japanese: たい焼き)	Konomi Tezuka	Natsuko Takahashi	Ryōsuke Senbo	April 5, 2026
1	"Takoyaki" (Japanese: たこ焼き)	Konomi Tezuka	Natsuko Takahashi	Ryōsuke Senbo	April 5, 2026
1	"Odango" (Japanese: お団子)	Konomi Tezuka	Natsuko Takahashi	Ryōsuke Senbo	April 5, 2026
1	"Convenience Store Onigiri"; Transliteration: "Konbini Onigiri" (Japanese: コンビニおにぎり)	Konomi Tezuka	Natsuko Takahashi	Ryōsuke Senbo	April 5, 2026
1	"Baumkuchen"; Transliteration: "Baumukūhen" (Japanese: バウムクーヘン)	Konomi Tezuka	Natsuko Takahashi	Ryōsuke Senbo	April 5, 2026
2	"Ice Cream"; Transliteration: "Aisu Kurīmu" (Japanese: アイスクリーム)	Sōta Shiro	Saeka Fujimoto	Ryōsuke Senbo	April 12, 2026
2	"Tian Cha"; Transliteration: "Tencha" (Japanese: 甜茶)	Sōta Shiro	Saeka Fujimoto	Ryōsuke Senbo	April 12, 2026
2	"Bolo"; Transliteration: "Bōro" (Japanese: ボーロ)	Sōta Shiro	Saeka Fujimoto	Ryōsuke Senbo	April 12, 2026
2	"Kikyou Shingen Mochi"; Transliteration: "Kikyō Shingen Mochi" (Japanese: 桔梗信玄餅)	Sōta Shiro	Saeka Fujimoto	Ryōsuke Senbo	April 12, 2026
2	"Melon Pan"; Transliteration: "Meronpan" (Japanese: メロンパン)	Sōta Shiro	Saeka Fujimoto	Ryōsuke Senbo	April 12, 2026
3	"Prepared Foods"; Transliteration: "Sōzai" (Japanese: 惣菜)	Shige Fukase	Rikimaru Masumoto	Ryōsuke Senbo	April 19, 2026
3	"Instant Curry"; Transliteration: "Retorutokarē" (Japanese: レトルトカレー)	Shige Fukase	Rikimaru Masumoto	Ryōsuke Senbo	April 19, 2026
3	"Fava Beans"; Transliteration: "Soramame" (Japanese: そら豆)	Shige Fukase	Rikimaru Masumoto	Ryōsuke Senbo	April 19, 2026
3	"Pickled Vegetables"; Transliteration: "Tsukemono" (Japanese: 漬物)	Shige Fukase	Rikimaru Masumoto	Ryōsuke Senbo	April 19, 2026
3	"Ion Supply Drinks"; Transliteration: "Ion Inryō" (Japanese: イオン飲料)	Shige Fukase	Rikimaru Masumoto	Ryōsuke Senbo	April 19, 2026
4	"Biscuit"; Transliteration: "Bisuketto" (Japanese: ビスケット)	Yuki Kusakabe	Natsuko Takahashi	Daiki Maezawa	April 26, 2026
4	"Anpan" (Japanese: あんぱん)	Yuki Kusakabe	Natsuko Takahashi	Daiki Maezawa	April 26, 2026
4	"Lemonade"; Transliteration: "Remonēdo" (Japanese: レモネード)	Yuki Kusakabe	Natsuko Takahashi	Daiki Maezawa	April 26, 2026
4	"Fried Chicken"; Transliteration: "Furaido Chikin" (Japanese: フライドチキン)	Yuki Kusakabe	Natsuko Takahashi	Daiki Maezawa	April 26, 2026
5	"Soft Serve"; Transliteration: "Sofuto Kurīmu" (Japanese: ソフトクリーム)	Lee Yong Kwan & Ryōsuke Senbo	Natsuko Takahashi	Ryōsuke Senbo	May 3, 2026
5	"Plum Wine"; Transliteration: "Umeshu" (Japanese: 梅酒)	Lee Yong Kwan & Ryōsuke Senbo	Natsuko Takahashi	Ryōsuke Senbo	May 3, 2026
5	"Barley Tea"; Transliteration: "Mugicha" (Japanese: 麦茶)	Lee Yong Kwan & Ryōsuke Senbo	Natsuko Takahashi	Ryōsuke Senbo	May 3, 2026
5	"Crepe"; Transliteration: "Kurēpu" (Japanese: クレープ)	Lee Yong Kwan & Ryōsuke Senbo	Natsuko Takahashi	Ryōsuke Senbo	May 3, 2026
5	"Raw Egg Over Rice"; Transliteration: "Tamago Kake Gohan" (Japanese: 卵かけご飯)	Lee Yong Kwan & Ryōsuke Senbo	Natsuko Takahashi	Ryōsuke Senbo	May 3, 2026
6	"Eel"; Transliteration: "Unagi" (Japanese: うなぎ)	Konomi Tezuka	Saeka Fujimoto	Yuuji Kanzaki	May 10, 2026
6	"Cold Tofu"; Transliteration: "Hiyayakko" (Japanese: 冷奴)	Konomi Tezuka	Saeka Fujimoto	Yuuji Kanzaki	May 10, 2026
6	"Festival"; Transliteration: "Omatsuri" (Japanese: お祭り)	Konomi Tezuka	Saeka Fujimoto	Yuuji Kanzaki	May 10, 2026
7	"Shaved Ice"; Transliteration: "Kakigōri" (Japanese: かき氷)	Sōta Shiro	Rikimaru Masumoto	Koji Yoshida	May 17, 2026
7	"Cheesecake"; Transliteration: "Chīzukēki" (Japanese: チーズケーキ)	Sōta Shiro	Rikimaru Masumoto	Koji Yoshida	May 17, 2026
7	"Plain Hot Water"; Transliteration: "Sayu" (Japanese: 白湯)	Sōta Shiro	Rikimaru Masumoto	Koji Yoshida	May 17, 2026
7	"Cup Noodles"; Transliteration: "Kappurāmen" (Japanese: カップラーメン)	Sōta Shiro	Rikimaru Masumoto	Koji Yoshida	May 17, 2026
8	"New Rice"; Transliteration: "Shin Kome" (Japanese: 新米)	Akira Shimizu	Natsuko Takahashi	Ryōsuke Senbo	May 24, 2026
8	"Curry"; Transliteration: "Karē" (Japanese: カレー)	Akira Shimizu	Natsuko Takahashi	Ryōsuke Senbo	May 24, 2026
8	"Roasted Sweet Potatoes"; Transliteration: "Yakiimo" (Japanese: 焼き芋)	Akira Shimizu	Natsuko Takahashi	Ryōsuke Senbo	May 24, 2026
8	"Grapes"; Transliteration: "Budō" (Japanese: ぶどう)	Akira Shimizu	Natsuko Takahashi	Ryōsuke Senbo	May 24, 2026
8	"Mechi Katsu"; Transliteration: "Menchi-katsu" (Japanese: メンチカツ)	Akira Shimizu	Natsuko Takahashi	Ryōsuke Senbo	May 24, 2026
9	"Miso Soup"; Transliteration: "Miso-shiru" (Japanese: 味噌汁)	Shige Fukase	Saeka Fujimoto	Mashiro	May 31, 2026
9	"Ginkgo"; Transliteration: "Ichō" (Japanese: 銀杏)	Shige Fukase	Saeka Fujimoto	Mashiro	May 31, 2026
9	"Halloween"; Transliteration: "Harowin" (Japanese: ハロウィン)	Shige Fukase	Saeka Fujimoto	Mashiro	May 31, 2026
10	"Thousand-Year Candy"; Transliteration: "Chitose Ame" (Japanese: 千歳飴)	Masayuki Iimura	Rikimaru Masumoto	Yuuji Kanzaki	June 7, 2026
10	"Corn Soup"; Transliteration: "Kōn Sūpu" (Japanese: コーンスープ)	Masayuki Iimura	Rikimaru Masumoto	Yuuji Kanzaki	June 7, 2026
10	"Hiking"; Transliteration: "Yamanobori" (Japanese: 山登り)	Masayuki Iimura	Rikimaru Masumoto	Yuuji Kanzaki	June 7, 2026
10	"Mikan" (Japanese: みかん)	Masayuki Iimura	Rikimaru Masumoto	Yuuji Kanzaki	June 7, 2026
10	"Meat Bun"; Transliteration: "Nikuman" (Japanese: 肉まん)	Masayuki Iimura	Rikimaru Masumoto	Yuuji Kanzaki	June 7, 2026
11	"Stollen"; Transliteration: "Shutoren" (Japanese: シュトレン)	Ryōsuke Senbo	Natsuko Takahashi	Koji Yoshida	June 14, 2026
11	"Persimmon"; Transliteration: "Kaki" (Japanese: 柿)	Ryōsuke Senbo	Natsuko Takahashi	Koji Yoshida	June 14, 2026
11	"Yuzu" (Japanese: 柚子)	Ryōsuke Senbo	Natsuko Takahashi	Koji Yoshida	June 14, 2026
11	"Christmas Cake"; Transliteration: "Kurisumasu Kēki" (Japanese: クリスマスケーキ)	Ryōsuke Senbo	Natsuko Takahashi	Koji Yoshida	June 14, 2026
12	"Gyoza"; Transliteration: "Gyōza" (Japanese: 餃子)	Konomi Tezuka	Natsuko Takahashi, Saeka Fujimoto & Rikimaru Masumoto	Ryōsuke Senbo	June 21, 2026
12	"Dried Daikon"; Transliteration: "Hoshi Daikon" (Japanese: 干し大根)	Konomi Tezuka	Natsuko Takahashi, Saeka Fujimoto & Rikimaru Masumoto	Ryōsuke Senbo	June 21, 2026
12	"Instant Noodles"; Transliteration: "Fukuromen" (Japanese: 袋麺)	Konomi Tezuka	Natsuko Takahashi, Saeka Fujimoto & Rikimaru Masumoto	Ryōsuke Senbo	June 21, 2026
12	"Year-End Soba"; Transliteration: "Toshikoshi Soba" (Japanese: 年越しそば)	Konomi Tezuka	Natsuko Takahashi, Saeka Fujimoto & Rikimaru Masumoto	Ryōsuke Senbo	June 21, 2026

== Reception ==
The manga was nominated for the 2022 Next Manga Award in the web manga category.
