= My Sweet Marriage to My Ex-Nemesis =

Japanese light novel series

- First light novel volume cover

組織の宿敵と結婚したらめちゃ甘い (Soshiki no Shukuteki to Kekkon Shitara Mecha Amai)
- Genre: Romantic comedy; Supernatural
- Light novel
- Written by: Toshimichi Uzō
- Illustrated by: Kewi Hayashi
- Published by: ASCII Media Works
- Imprint: Dengeki Bunko
- Original run: October 6, 2023 – present
- Volumes: 5
- Manga
- Written by: Toshimichi Uzō
- Illustrated by: Shiime
- Published by: ASCII Media Works
- English publisher: NA: One Peace Books
- Imprint: Dengeki Comics NEXT
- Magazine: Dengeki Maoh
- Original run: November 27, 2024 – present
- Volumes: 2
- Anime television series
- Directed by: Atsushi Nigorikawa
- Written by: Keiichirō Ōchi
- Studio: EMT Squared; Ankichi Kobo (production cooperation)

My Sweet Marriage to My Ex-Nemesis (Japanese: 組織の宿敵と結婚したらめちゃ甘い, Hepburn: Soshiki no Shukuteki to Kekkon Shitara Mecha Amai) is a Japanese light novel series written by Toshimichi Uzō and illustrated by Kewi Hayashi. ASCII Media Works began publishing it under their Dengeki Bunko imprint in October 2023; five volumes have been published as of November 2026. A manga adaptation illustrated by Shiime began serialization in ASCII Media Works' Dengeki Maoh magazine in November 2024 and has been compiled into two tankōbon volumes as of July 2026. An anime television series adaptation produced by EMT Squared has been announced.

== Plot ==
The series follows married couple Rōshi Saikawa and Ritsuka Saikawa (née Nagira). Years ago, the two belonged to rival organizations, with Rōshi being nicknamed the "Feather Hunter" and Ritsuka being nicknamed the "White Demon". Although the two hated other, they fall in love after their organizations disband. Despite their marriage, the two have never had sex, something which Rōshi has become conscious of.

== Characters ==
Rōshi Saikawa (犀川 狼士, Saikawa Rōshi)
Ritsuka's husband, who currently works as a salaryman. He is deeply in love with Ritsuka, but he is conscious of the fact that he is still a virgin despite being married to her.
Ritsuka Saikawa (犀川 律花, Saikawa Ritsuka)
Rōshi's wife. She has a strict personality, but she loves Rōshi and deeply cares about him.

== Media ==
=== Light novel ===
The series is written by Toshimichi Uzō and illustrated by Kewi Hayashi. ASCII Media Works began publishing it under their Dengeki Bunko imprint in October 2023; five volumes have been published as of November 2026.

No.	Japanese release date	Japanese ISBN
1	October 6, 2023	978-4-04-915073-5
2	May 10, 2024	978-4-04-915656-0
3	November 8, 2024	978-4-04-915983-7
4	August 10, 2025	978-4-04-916303-2
5	November 10, 2026	978-4-04-952483-3

=== Manga ===
A manga adaptation illustrated by Shiime began serialization in ASCII Media Works' Dengeki Maoh magazine on November 27, 2024. The first volume was published on June 27, 2025; two volumes have been released as of July 27, 2026. The manga is licensed in English by One Peace Books, which will release the first volume on March 16, 2027.

No.	Original release date	Original ISBN	English release date	English ISBN
1	June 27, 2025	978-4-04-916527-2	March 16, 2027	978-1-64273-663-2
2	July 27, 2026	978-4-04-952185-6	—	—

=== Anime ===
An anime television series adaptation was announced during the "Dengeki Bunko Fall Festival Online 2026" livestream event on October 3, 2026. The series will be produced by EMT Squared in cooperation with Ankichi Kobo and directed by Atsushi Nigorikawa, with Keiichirō Ōchi handling series composition and Yūki Nakano designing the characters.
