= I Want to Escape from Princess Lessons =

Japanese light novel series

- First light novel volume cover

妃教育から逃げたい私 (Kisaki Kyōiku kara Nigetai Watashi)
- Genre: Romantic comedy
- Novel series
- Written by: Izumi Sawano
- Published by: Shōsetsuka ni Narō
- Original run: August 12, 2018 – May 11, 2019
- Light novel
- Written by: Izumi Sawano
- Illustrated by: Miru Yumesaki
- Published by: Shufu to Seikatsu Sha
- English publisher: NA: J-Novel Club
- Imprint: PASH! Books
- Original run: April 26, 2019 – May 31, 2024
- Volumes: 3
- Manga
- Written by: Izumi Sawano
- Illustrated by: Uri Sugata
- Published by: Shufu to Seikatsu Sha
- English publisher: NA: J-Novel Club Seven Seas Entertainment
- Magazine: PASH UP!
- Original run: March 25, 2020 – January 21, 2026
- Volumes: 8
- Anime television series
- Directed by: Shinobu Tagashira
- Written by: Tomoco Kanemaki
- Music by: Yuki Hayashi; Naoyuki Chikatani
- Studio: EMT Squared
- Licensed by: Crunchyroll; SEA: Muse Communication
- Original network: Tokyo MX, BS Fuji, AT-X
- Original run: January 5, 2025 – March 23, 2025
- Episodes: 12
- icon

I Want to Escape from Princess Lessons (Japanese: 妃教育から逃げたい私, Hepburn: Kisaki Kyōiku kara Nigetai Watashi) is a Japanese light novel series written by Izumi Sawano and illustrated by Miru Yumesaki. It was serialized online from August 2018 to May 2019 on the user-generated novel publishing website Shōsetsuka ni Narō. It was later acquired by Shufu to Seikatsu Sha, who have published two volumes between April 2019 and March 2020 under their PASH! Books imprint. A manga adaptation with art by Uri Sugata was serialized online via Shufu to Seikatsu Sha's PASH UP! website from March 2020 to January 2026 and was collected in eight tankōbon volumes. Both the light novel and manga have been licensed in North America by J-Novel Club. An anime television series adaptation produced by EMT Squared aired from January to March 2025.

== Premise ==
Duke's daughter Leticia "Lettie" Dorman became betrothed to Crown Prince Clarke at the age of seven. Once a free-spirited girl, she now feels stifled from the strict education she's receiving to make her into a proper future princess. Wishing for the prince to someday take an interest in someone else, she is elated to see Clarke show up to a royal ball with another woman beside him. Presuming her dream has come true and her engagement has been broken off, she leaves with the intention of pursuing a simple life in the countryside. However, her newfound peace is interrupted when Clarke shows up, claiming that they're still engaged. Clarke is determined to woo Lettie and marry her, while Lettie is determined to resist his charms and escape. The story follows the ensuing battle of wills that take place between the two of them.

== Characters ==
Leticia Dorman (レティシア・ドルマン, Retishia Doruman)
Voiced by: Haruka Shiraishi
Her nickname is "Lettie". She and Prince Clark first met as children.
Prince Clarke (クラーク, Kurāku)
Voiced by: Jun Fukuyama
Due to having little to no contact with Lettie during their engagement, he had been unaware of how Lettie's lessons affected her feelings towards their betrothal. His character is a parody of the yandere archetype.
Nadir (ナディル, Nadiru)
Voiced by: Wataru Hatano
Brianna (ブリアナ, Buriana)
Voiced by: Yuka Saitō
Louis (ルイ, Rui)
Voiced by: Shun Horie
Lyle (ライル, Rairu)
Voiced by: Shun'ichi Toki
Lily (リリー, Rirī)
Voiced by: Mie Sonozaki
Maria (マリア)
Voiced by: Rie Suegara

== Media ==
=== Light novels ===
Written by Izumi Sawano, I Want to Escape from Princess Lessons was serialized online on the user-generated novel publishing website Shōsetsuka ni Narō from August 12, 2018, to May 11, 2019. It was later acquired by Shufu to Seikatsu Sha, who published two volumes with illustrations by Miru Yumesaki between April 26, 2019, to March 27, 2020, under their PASH! Books light novel imprint. An additional third volume was published for the paperback edition on May 31, 2024.

During their Anime Expo 2023 panel, J-Novel Club announced that they licensed the light novels for English publication.

No.	Original release date	Original ISBN	North American release date	North American ISBN
1	April 26, 2019	978-4-391-15322-4	September 20, 2023	978-1-718-37634-2
2	March 27, 2020	978-4-391-15463-4	November 22, 2023	978-1-718-37636-6
3	May 31, 2024	978-4-391-16253-0	March 27, 2025	978-1-718-37644-1

=== Manga ===
A manga adaptation illustrated by Uri Sugata was serialized on Shufu to Seikatsu Sha's PASH UP! website from March 25, 2020, to January 21, 2026. Its chapters were collected into eight volumes released from November 27, 2020, to May 1, 2026.

On September 15, 2023, J-Novel Club announced that they also licensed the manga adaptation. Seven Seas Entertainment licensed the manga as well.

No.	Original release date	Original ISBN	North American release date	North American ISBN
1	November 27, 2020	978-4-391-15532-7	November 29, 2023 (digital); February 11, 2025 (print)	978-1-718-37725-7 (digital); 979-8-89160-732-3 (print)
2	May 7, 2021	978-4-391-15600-3	February 21, 2024; May 6, 2025 (print)	978-1-718-37726-4 (digital); 979-8-89160-881-8 (print)
3	March 4, 2022	978-4-391-15733-8	July 17, 2024 (digital); August 19, 2025 (print)	978-1-718-37727-1 (digital); 979-8-89160-948-8 (print)
4	May 2, 2023	978-4-391-15955-4	August 27, 2025 (digital); January 27, 2026 (print)	978-1-718-37728-8 (digital); 979-8-89373-419-5 (print)
5	November 2, 2023	978-4-391-16108-3	November 26, 2025 (digital); July 7, 2026 (print)	978-1-718-37729-5 (digital); 979-8-89373-635-9 (print)
6	December 6, 2024	978-4-391-16399-5	February 25, 2026 (digital); November 10, 2026 (print)	978-1-718-37730-1 (digital); 979-8-89561-445-7 (print)
7	September 5, 2025	978-4-391-16565-4	—	—
8	May 1, 2026	978-4-391-16766-5	—	—

=== Anime ===
An anime television series adaptation was announced on November 2, 2023. It is produced by EMT Squared and directed by Shinobu Tagashira, with Tomoco Kanemaki writing series scripts, Tagashira designing the characters, and Yuki Hayashi and Naoyuki Chikatani composing the music. The series aired from January 5 to March 23, 2025, on Tokyo MX and other networks. The opening theme song is "Kimi to Shika Koi Shinai" (君としか恋しない; lit. 'I'll Only Fall in Love With You') by Jun Fukuyama, while the ending theme song is "Alibi na Curtsey" (アリバイなカーテシー; lit. 'An Alibi-Like Curtsey') by Dialogue+. Crunchyroll streamed the series. Muse Communication licensed the series in Southeast Asia.

==== Episodes ====
No.	Title	Directed by	Written by	Storyboarded by	Original release date
1	"Episode 1"	Shinobu Tagashira	Tomoco Kanemaki	Shinobu Tagashira	January 5, 2025
Seven year old Leticia, daughter of Duke and Lady Dorman, is told she has become engaged to Prince Clarke. Her parents immediately send Leticia to the capital with only her stern elder brother Nadir. Leticia is placed with the intimidating Laila Mayer for harsh lessons on how to act like a Queen. The only friend Leticia gains is her royal maid Lily. Several years pass and Leticia endures lessons on smiling, polite conversation, politics, history, economics and dozens of other subjects. She also becomes emotionally withdrawn and depressed. After ten years Leticia attends a royal ball where Prince Clarke arrives with Lady Brianna Larique and confirms Brianna is his companion. The entire court is shocked when Leticia yells in triumph, thrilled the engagement and lessons are finally over. Thanking Brianna profusely for taking her place she flees the palace, leaving Clarke bewildered, and reminds Nadir that he promised if Clarke ended the engagement they would leave. Nadir unwillingly agrees to take Leticia to live in Aberta, one of the villages on their father's land. Lily also decides to go with her.
2	"Episode 2"	Naoki Murata	Sumi Hatsuta	Shinobu Tagashira	January 12, 2025
Clarke's mother, the Queen, demands a full explanation. Brianna only endures a few days with Laila before she can't take it anymore. Leticia moves into Aberta with Lily and happily spends her days fishing. Unfortunately, Clarke appears and begins following her. Clarke learns from the locals that Leticia's cheerful and generous nature has made her beloved by the village. He himself cannot believe how Leticia has changed once freed from her lessons. He then drops the bombshell that legally he and Leticia are still engaged. Leticia rushes home where Nadir explains that during their supposed breakup Clarke never actually said he was ending their engagement, only that he was accompanying Brianna to the ball. It was Leticia who misunderstood his words, but her emotional outburst has ignited real passion in Clarke. Brianna arrives and begs Leticia to take Clarke back as she can't stand Laila anymore. Plus Clarke has made an official declaration he will only have royal heirs with Leticia. To make matters worse Leticia's parents arrive, demanding to know everything. Leticia decides to run away but is stopped by Brianna. Leticia escapes anyway by promising to introduce Brianna to Nadir as a potential husband. Unfortunately, Leticia only makes it a short distance before running into Clarke.
3	"Episode 3"	Takanari Hirayama	Tomoco Kanemaki	Shinobu Tagashira	January 19, 2025
Queen Laura decides to meet the famous Leticia. Leticia finds everyone is in total support of Clarke returning her to the capital, even Lily. On the trip Clarke claims he wants her to get to know him as a person, though this only creeps her out. Arriving at the castle Clarke shows he has had a garden constructed for her with horses, sheep and a river for fishing. Plus he has cancelled her lessons with Laila, having bribed his father, the King, with the promise of future grandchildren. He then asks her to marry him, but she resolutely refuses. After locking her in her room Leticia has a nightmare of Clarke as a monster she can't escape. The next morning Leticia attempts to escape at the first opportunity but is apprehended by Clarke in the castle garden. Next she attempts to swap clothes with her new maid Maria, who summons Clarke at once. Clarke then spends all evening keeping an eye on her, complimenting her beauty for hours. Once left alone Leticia grows even more daring and breaks a window to escape, but Clarke apprehends her in the garden yet again, this time to ask which jewellery she wants to match her wedding dress.
4	"Episode 4"	Han Yongxun	Sumi Hatsuta	Shinobu Tagashira	January 26, 2025
Leticia is moved to a room with barred windows. Brianna shows her a trashy romance novel written by Clarke that romanticises Leticia's attempts to escape princess lessons that ends with her falling in love with Clarke. Leticia is outraged at Clarke's brazen attempt to manipulate public opinion. Nadir tries to cheer her up with Death Muffin Roulette, a childhood game that ends when one of them eats a muffin filled with spices. Leticia discovers an escape route behind a bookcase, but finds it leads straight to Clarke's bedroom. After escaping his attempts to snuggle Leticia seals up the bookcase, but Clarke simply enters her room through the door. Leticia complains to Nadir about Clarke invading her bedroom as an unmarried woman. He advises that instead of merely saying "no", she should demonstrate her displeasure more clearly. That night when Clarke attempts to snuggle she warns him if he touches her she will never speak his name again. Clarke is shocked but agrees not to enter her room without warning her first. Brianna scolds Leticia as both she and Clarke are acting like children. Leticia is outraged when Clarke sends her a schedule outlining his plans to enter her room every night, so she can't claim he did it without warning her first.
5	"Episode 5"	Shinobu Tagashira	Tomoco Kanemaki	Shinobu Tagashira	February 2, 2025
Leticia is kidnapped so Clarke organises a search. The kidnappers, Louis Third Prince of Delbaran and his servant Lyle, realise they have kidnapped the wrong woman; they were actually targeting Leticia's maid Maria. They explain Maria was once Delbaran nobility and Louis childhood friend, but after her family was disgraced Maria disappeared, and Louis wants to rescue her so he can marry her. Sensing an opportunity Leticia demands they take her to Delbaran so she can live as an anonymous commoner. Confused, they decide to stay at an inn and return her to Clarke in the morning, claim they rescued her and request Maria as Louis' reward. Clarke suddenly arrives, leading to a childish four way argument between them, before Nadir arrives to yell at them. Clarke decides to return Leticia to the castle, after she tries to escape again and is caught by Nadir. At the castle it is revealed Maria doesn't like Louis at all, and is furious he arranged to become an exchange student and will be staying at the castle for months. Nadir reveals he arranged everything, believing some chaotic palace drama might be amusing for Leticia, which she looks forward to. Meanwhile, Brianna spots Clarke with another woman and is convinced he is having an affair.
6	"Episode 6"	Shun Tsuchida	Sumi Hatsuta	Shinobu Tagashira	February 9, 2025
Leticia is formally introduced to Clarke's mother, Queen Laura, and his baby brother Matthias whom Leticia finds adorable, which makes Clarke childishly jealous. Brianna eventually tells Leticia about Clarke's affair. Leticia is furious that Clarke is holding her against her will and yet feels free to date other women, so she sends Brianna, Maria, Louis and Lyle to find out what Clarke is up to. Interviewing the palace staff they discover Clarke has often been seen in the other woman's presence and even summons her to his room on occasion. Most recently, they took a carriage to the city, so Leticia decides to follow them with Maria and Brianna's help. Brianna is outraged when Clarke takes the woman to a gentlemen's club and forces Leticia to confront him. She is embarrassed to learn the beautiful woman is actually a man in female clothing, Duke Neil, younger brother to the king of Delbaran, making him Louis' uncle. With the misunderstanding cleared up Neil departs and Clarke invites Leticia on a secret date, since she has already escaped the palace. After shopping Clarke buys her a music box as a memento. Leticia admits she is unfamiliar with romance and still plans to try and escape. Clarke accepts this and promises to always capture her and bring her back. Eavesdropping, Neil and Leticia's friends consider this a very successful first date.
7	"Episode 7"	Yuki Nishihata	Saeka Fujimoto	Shinobu Tagashira & Yuki Nishihata	February 16, 2025
Whilst trying to sneak into Maria's room in the middle of the night Louis and Lyle encounter a glowing white ghost which kidnaps Louis. Everyone splits up to search. Clarke admits to Leticia the palace is haunted as several nobles have been kidnapped by a ghost and never found. Brianna and Nadir encounter the ghost in a store room which lifts Nadir into the air. Brianna is imprisoned in an iron maiden. Maria, Neil and Clarke are dragged into secret passages. Leticia tries to follow but a trapdoor drops her to the basement. She demands the ghost return Clarke to her, only to find everybody safe with Queen Laura. It transpires most of the palaces traps and secret passages all end up in the basement where Laura has been researching cutting edge beauty treatments, giving her pale skin that glows like a ghost. Louis is unharmed, blissfully submerged in a bath of skin cream. Lily appears during the chaos, having been placed in Leticia's service again by Nadir. Everyone yells at Louis for worrying them. Laura sneaks Leticia a map of the palace showing several escape routes which even Clarke doesn't know about, and asks her to make sure Clarke keeps having fun. Lyle sleeps blissfully, unaware the real ghost is watching him.
8	"Episode 8"	Shinobu Tagashira	Tomoco Kanemaki	Shinobu Tagashira	February 23, 2025
Clarke dreams of the past when he and Leticia were children, and even though she ran away from him even then he still asked his parents to arrange their engagement. He awakens and starts to question whether pursuing Leticia is the right thing to do anymore. Louis' eldest brother Nathan visits the palace. Neil notices a disused hot spring in the palace grounds and arranges to have it repaired. Clarke continues to remember Leticia as a child, particularly how unhappy she was, and how nothing he did could ever make her smile. Eventually he asked Nadir what Leticia really thinks of him, and Nadir confirmed Leticia had retreated behind a mask of indifference and had no interest in him whatsoever. To make her drop that mask Nadir conspired with Clarke to make it seem like he was abandoning Leticia to marry Brianna, resulting in Leticia finally breaking out of her depression. After retrieving her from Aberta Clarke was happy to find Leticia was back to her old self. In the present Nadir is content that conspiring with Clarke was successful at making Leticia happy again, though he is disappointed at the time it is taking to convince her to marry Clarke. Nathan quickly realises Nadir and Clarke are conspiring together, though they deny everything.
9	"Episode 9"	Kim Seong-il	Sumi Hatsuta	Shinobu Tagashira & Masakazu Amiya	March 2, 2025
Neil's brother, the adventurer Dale, and his three sons begin repairing the palaces hot spring. Leticia is forced to resume meeting Laila for Queen Lessons, so she escapes again. She encounters Lyle running away to be with his sweetheart in Delbaran. They are both caught escaping and air their grievances to everyone, which are ignored by Clarke and Louis. Leticia attempts to escape through a vent but becomes stuck until Clarke rescues her. Embarrassed by the implication she got stuck due to gaining weight Leticia hides all day until Clarke invites her to a picnic with everyone. Neil announces the spring has been repaired. Leticia learns Dale could have been king of Delbaran but abdicated to go adventuring, eventually marrying his wife, also an adventurer. Everyone enjoys the hot spring together until a giant Milou attacks the garden. Maria, Nadir, Clarke, Dale and his sons battle the Milou but Leticia notices it is searching for something. She then realises Dale's youngest son took the Milou's baby as a pet. Reunited, the Milou departs peacefully with its baby. Leticia stands up to Laila and asks that, along with Queen Lessons, she teaches her other things, such as how to plant a garden. Laila eventually agrees, making Leticia happy. Lyle ends up stuck looking after Dale as well, who at heart is as impossibly childish as Louis.
10	"Episode 10"	Arisa Shima	Sumi Hatsuta	Shinobu Tagashira	March 9, 2025
Leticia discovers a painting of a young boy and girl. At a tea party Queen Laura takes Leticia's description of Clarke as stubborn and pushy to mean she likes him. Leticia is amazed Laura claims Clarke was her first love as a child. Leticia asks Maria and Brianna about love. Maria has never been in love but desires passion with a physically strong man. Brianna had a childhood love she remembers fondly but since first love rarely lasts she simply desires any man rich enough to support her. Leticia remains confused but that night while dancing alone finds herself thinking of Clarke. She returns to the painting and realises it is her and Clarke by a tree in the palace garden where they first met. She returns to the tree trying to remember more and by chance encounters Clarke there. Remembering that the first time she fell out of the tree on top of him, she jumps from the tree again, and this time he catches her. Clarke admits he fell in love with her that day and even asked her to marry him in the future. Leticia realises she has actually been in love with Clarke the whole time.
11	"Episode 11"	Hideki Takayama	Tomoco Kanemaki	Kō Matsuzono	March 16, 2025
Clarke starts to wonder what life might be like as a commoner and Lyle overhears him telling the King that, if Leticia asked him to, he would refuse the throne. Lyle reports this to everyone and soon they all believe Clarke and Leticia are planning to escape with money from stealing royal jewellery. Deciding to support them Brianna ensures there will be an escape route after the wedding. The rumour reaches Neil, who fears they intend to steal a necklace given to the King by Delbaran's King, leading to political conflict. Laila hears the rumour and is distraught her years preparing Leticia to become Queen will be wasted if Clarke refuses the throne. With rumours everywhere Nadir demands to know who started it and Lyle reveals he clearly heard Clarke say he would give up the throne for Leticia. Leticia hears this and furiously confronts Clarke, even throwing her music box at him. Clarke is amused, revealing Lyle heard only part of the conversation. The rest was on his plans to be the best king he can be so Leticia could be proud of him. Embarrassed, Leticia flees. With everything cleared up, the wedding day arrives and as Leticia joins Clarke at the altar she realises there will soon be no more chances to escape.
12	"Episode 12"	Naoya Murakawa	Tomoco Kanemaki	Shinobu Tagashira	March 23, 2025
Leticia and Clarke are now married. Unfortunately Leticia is so nervous she pretends to go to sleep early every day for a week to avoid consummating the marriage. Nadir is furious as it is her duty to provide Clarke a royal heir, but Clarke insists it is fine since he promised Leticia he wouldn't touch her until she asks him to. Brianna tries to help by offering see through pyjamas; Louis tries to buy one for Maria and Clarke buys ten, though Leticia refuses to contemplate wearing them. Matthias goes missing and Leticia eventually finds him in a greenhouse, so she tells him stories of heroic adventurers until he feels better. Matthias shows her he stole her broken music box from Clarke and was planning to escape the palace to find a craftsman to repair it, but he became scared and hid instead. Clarke eventually finds them both fast asleep in the greenhouse, to the considerable relief of the palace staff. That night Leticia and Clarke share a romantic moment, even kissing, but Leticia panics again and pushes him away. Leticia eventually falls asleep but Clarke is unable due to Leticia's impossibly loud snoring. The next day Clarke has the music box repaired and asks Leticia to dance. Leticia declares they are not dancing people, and so they go for a horse ride around the palace instead.

== Reception ==
By November 2023, the series has 1.2 million copies in circulation.
