= The High School Life of a Fudanshi =

Japanese manga and anime series

- The cover of the first volume featuring Ryō Sakaguchi.

腐男子高校生活
- Genre: Comedy
- Manga
- Written by: Michinoku Atami
- Published by: Ichijinsha
- English publisher: Seven Seas Entertainment
- Imprint: Zero-Sum Comics
- Magazine: Zero-Sum Online
- Original run: September 25, 2015 – September 7, 2018
- Volumes: 5
- Anime television series
- Directed by: Tokoro Toshikatsu
- Written by: Fujimoto Saeka
- Music by: Abe Nobuyuki
- Studio: EMT Squared
- Original network: AT-X, KBS Kyoto, Sun TV, tvk, TVS
- Original run: July 5, 2016 – September 20, 2016
- Episodes: 12

The High School Life of a Fudanshi (腐男子高校生活, Fudanshi Kōkō Seikatsu) is a Japanese yonkoma manga series written and drawn by Michinoku Atami. The manga is published online in Ichijinsha's Zero-Sum Online with first tankōbon format released on September 25, 2015. The manga is licensed in North America by Seven Seas Entertainment. This work parodies BL's cliche and fandom, but is more focused on the genre, than other elements.

An anime adaptation was produced by EMT Squared and broadcast in Japan from July 5, 2016, with each episode 4 minutes long.

== Plot ==
Ryo Sakaguchi has a secret: he is a fudanshi straight boy obsessed with boys' love (BL), the genre of stories revolving around the romance between two men. While he has trouble understanding how others do not find the same bliss he does from his hobbies, that does not make it any easier for Ryo to buy his manga from the "girls" section of the store, or explaining the world of boys' love, shipping wars, and doujinshi circles to his best friend Nakamura. Will Ryo find other fanboys to share his hobby with, or is he doomed to sit alone on his throne of BL romance?

== Characters ==
Ryō Sakaguchi (坂口 亮, Sakaguchi Ryō)
Voiced by: Wataru Hatano
The series' protagonist. He is nicknamed Gucchi (グッチ). He really likes BL to the point that he gets excited over everything that resembles BL in real life, but is too shy to buy BL doujinshi by himself because of his sex. Despite his hobby, he is straight.
Toshiaki Nakamura (中村 俊明, Nakamuara Toshiaki)
Voiced by: Kenji Nojima
Sakaguchi's friend who doesn't like BL, but still understands his friend's hobby even though he sometimes questions Sakaguchi's real sexual orientation.
Rumi Nishihara (西原 ルミ, Nishihara Rumi)
Voiced by: Aya Suzaki
At first glance she is a normal high school girl, but is actually a fujoshi. By chance she becomes friends with Sakaguchi, and becomes the one who introduces Sakaguchi to the whole new level of BL love by taking him to the Comiket. The work implies that she has something for Ryo, but so far it has not developed.
Yūjirō Shiratori (白鳥 勇次郎, Shiratori Yūjirō)
Voiced by: Tatsuhisa Suzuki
Sakaguchi's friend who is a cross-dressing homosexual and president of the Cooking Club. Even though he acts completely like a woman, his strength is similar to a delinquent.
Akira Ueda (上田 アキラ, Ueda Akira)
Voiced by: Toshiki Masuda
Shiratori's servant who will do anything for him. Akira is not gay though, (Note: The official manga website wrote "でもホモではない", which means "but not a gay" on his profile.) which parodies BL-bait fan-service in anime and manga.
Daigo (台後)
Voiced by: Kōtarō Nishiyama
A fudanshi whose class is next to Sakaguchi's and apparently a BL doujinshika.
Keichi (圭一)
Voiced by: Katsuhiro Tokuishi
A cooking club member who joined the club because his childhood friend always says meals cooked by Keichi are bland.
Reiji (レイジ)
Voiced by: Norihito Hase
Keichi's childhood friend. He's so close and jealous of Keichi that Ryo regularly comments that their friendship looks like a BL-subtext manga.
Kana-chan (かなちょん)
Voiced by: Yuiko Tatsumi
Rumi's (normal) friend.
Yukari (ゆかり)
Reiji's younger sister. A shrine maiden who likes Keiichi but who is continuously blocked by her brother.

== Media ==
=== Manga ===
The yonkoma manga was written and drawn by Atami Michinoku and published online in Ichijinsha's Zero-Sum Online. The series so far has been compiled into five tankōbon as of September 2018. Seven Seas Entertainment announced that it had licensed the manga in North America on August 5, 2016.

==== Volume list ====
No.	Original release date	Original ISBN	English release date	English ISBN
1	September 27, 2015	978-4-7580-3115-8	May 30, 2017	978-1-626925-31-1
2	April 25, 2016	978-4-7580-3179-0	September 19, 2017	978-1-626925-53-3
3	November 25, 2016	978-4-7580-3239-1	January 9, 2018	978-1-626926-79-0
4	September 25, 2017	978-4-7580-3314-5	November 27, 2018	978-1-626927-87-2
5	September 25, 2018	978-4-7580-3385-5	October 29, 2019	978-1-642756-92-0

=== Anime ===
The anime is directed by Toshikatsu Tokoro at EMT Squared with Chinatsu Ishida adapting Michinoku's original design. Nobuyuki Abe as sound director while DAX Production handled the sound production. Dream Creation handled the production. The theme song titled "Sekai wa Boy Meets Boy ♂" (SEKAIはボーイミーツボーイ♂) is sung by Ryō Sakaguchi's voice actor Wataru Hatano.

The blu-ray and DVD were released on October 14, 2016, containing all 12 episodes of the anime.

==== Episode list ====
No.	Japanese title (Note: All original title are taken from episode's title cards) Official English title (Note: All English titles are taken from Crunchyroll)	Original release date
1	"The Daily Life of a Fudanshi High School Student"; Transliteration: "Fudanshi Kōkōsei no Nichijō" (Japanese: 腐男子高校生の日常)	July 5, 2016
2	"My Classmates"; Transliteration: "Ore no Kurasumeito" (Japanese: 俺のクラスメイト)	July 12, 2016
3	"There are Fujoshi Everywhere"; Transliteration: "Sokokashiko ni Fujoshi wa Iru" (Japanese: そこかしこに腐女子はいる)	July 19, 2016
4	"My First Otaku Friend"; Transliteration: "Hajimete no Otaku Tomodachi" (Japanese: はじめてのオタク友達)	July 26, 2016
5	"Troublesome Kōhai"; Transliteration: "Nikuari na Kōhai-tachi" (Japanese: 難ありな後輩たち)	August 3, 2016
6	"Summer for Otakus"; Transliteration: "Otaku no Natsu" (Japanese: オタクの夏)	August 10, 2016
7	"Everyone's Fun Times"; Transliteration: "Sorezore no Tanoshimi" (Japanese: それぞれの楽しみ)	August 17, 2016
8	"The Girl On My Mind"; Transliteration: "Kininaru Joshi" (Japanese: 気になる女子)	August 24, 2016
9	"Transformation Desires"; Transliteration: "Henshin (sasetai) Ganbō" (Japanese: 変身（させたい）願望)	August 31, 2016
10	"Worldly Desires of 801 (Yaoi)"; Transliteration: "801 no Bon'nō" (Japanese: 801の煩悩)	September 7, 2016
11	"Bittersweet Valentine"; Transliteration: "Amakunai Barentain" (Japanese: 甘くないバレンタイン)	September 14, 2016
12	"What Moves Me"; Transliteration: "Ore wo Ugokasu Mono" (Japanese: オレをうごかすモノ)	September 21, 2016

=== Web radio ===
A web radio titled Radio Fudanshi Kōkō Seikatsu "Fu-Jinrui Mina Kyōdai!!" (ラジオ 腐男子高校生活「腐人類みな兄弟!!」) (Note: The kanji of Fu-Jinrui combines the word "Fu" (rotten, also the same kanji used for fudanshi and fujoshi) and "Jinrui" (humanity).) started airing from July 3, 2016, on Anitama for 30 minutes an episode, with Hatano Wataru (Sakaguchi Ryō) and Suzaki Aya (Nishihara Rumi) as hosts.
