= EMT Squared =

Japanese animation studio

EMT Squared Co., Ltd.
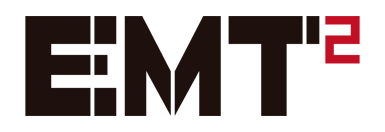
- Native name: 株式会社EMTスクエアード
- Romanized name: Kabushiki-gaisha EMT Sukueādo
- Type: Kabushiki gaisha
- Industry: Japanese animation
- Founded: July 25, 2013; 13 years ago
- Headquarters: Momoi, Suginami, Tokyo, Japan
- Key people: Hideaki Miyamoto (CEO)
- Total equity: ¥ 4,000,000
- Number of employees: 60 (As of July 2026)
- Divisions: CG Department (Note: EMT CG Department (EMT CG部), the studio's 3DCG department.)
- Website: emt2.co.jp

EMT Squared Co., Ltd. (株式会社EMTスクエアード, Kabushiki-gaisha EMT Sukueādo), also referred to and stylized as EMT², is a Japanese animation studio established on July 25, 2013, by Hideaki Miyamoto, a former TMS Entertainment producer.

== List of works ==
=== Anime television series ===
Title	Director(s)	First run start date	First run end date	Eps	Note(s)	Ref(s)
Rainy Cocoa	Tomomi Mochizuki	April 5, 2015	June 21, 2015	12	Adapted from a digital manga series.	
Rainy Cocoa, Welcome to Rainy Color	Kazuomi Koga	October 5, 2015	December 27, 2015	12	Sequel to Rainy Cocoa.	
Kuma Miko: Girl Meets Bear	Kiyoshi Matsuda	April 3, 2016	June 19, 2016	12	Adapted from a manga series by Masume Yoshimoto. Co-animated with Kinema Citrus.	
The High School Life of a Fudanshi	Toshikatsu Tokoro	July 5, 2016	September 20, 2016	12	Adapted from a manga series by Michinoku Atami.	
Rainy Cocoa in Hawaii	Hisashi Ishii	October 2, 2016	December 18, 2016	12	Sequel to Rainy Cocoa, Welcome to Rainy Color.	
Nyanko Days	Yoshimasa Hiraike	January 8, 2017	March 26, 2017	12	Adapted from a manga series by Tarabagani.	
Love Tyrant	Atsushi Nigorikawa	April 6, 2017	June 22, 2017	12	Adapted from a manga series by Megane Mihoshi.	
Urahara	Amika Kubo	October 4, 2017	December 20, 2017	12	Adapted from a webcomic by Patrick Macias and Mugi Tanaka. Co-animated with Shirogumi.	
Rainy Cocoa 'Amecon!!'	Hisashi Ishii	October 4, 2017	December 20, 2017	12	Sequel to Rainy Cocoa in Hawaii.	
Alice or Alice	Kōsuke Kobayashi	April 4, 2018	June 20, 2018	12	Adapted from a manga series by Riko Korie.	
The Master of Ragnarok & Blesser of Einherjar	Kōsuke Kobayashi	July 8, 2018	September 23, 2018	12	Adapted from a light novel series by Seiichi Takayama.	
Rainy Cocoa side G	Hisashi Ishii	January 9, 2019	March 26, 2019	12	Spin-off of Rainy Cocoa 'Amecon!!'.	
Assassins Pride	Kazuya Aiura	October 10, 2019	December 26, 2019	12	Adapted from a light novel series by Kei Amagi.	
A Destructive God Sits Next to Me	Atsushi Nigorikawa	January 11, 2020	March 28, 2020	12	Adapted from a manga series by Arata Aki.	
Kuma Kuma Kuma Bear	Hisashi Ishii; Yuu Nobuta	October 7, 2020	December 23, 2020	12	Adapted from a light novel series by Kumanano.	
Drugstore in Another World	Masafumi Satō	July 7, 2021	September 22, 2021	12	Adapted from a light novel series by Kennoji.	
I'm Quitting Heroing	Yuu Nobuta; Hisashi Ishii	April 5, 2022	June 21, 2022	12	Adapted from a light novel series by Quantum.	
Shoot! Goal to the Future	Noriyuki Nakamura	July 2, 2022	September 24, 2022	13	Related to the Shoot! manga series by Tsukasa Ooshima. Co-animated with Magic Bus.	
Beast Tamer	Atsushi Nigorikawa	October 2, 2022	December 25, 2022	13	Adapted from a light novel series by Suzu Miyama.	
Kuma Kuma Kuma Bear Punch!	Hisashi Ishii; Yuu Nobuta	April 3, 2023	June 19, 2023	12	Sequel to Kuma Kuma Kuma Bear.	
The Aristocrat's Otherworldly Adventure: Serving Gods Who Go Too Far	Noriyuki Nakamura	April 3, 2023	June 19, 2023	12	Adapted from a light novel series by Yashu. Co-animated with Magic Bus.	
Fluffy Paradise	Jun'ichi Kitamura	January 7, 2024	March 24, 2024	12	Adapted from a light novel series by Himawari.	
Train to the End of the World	Tsutomu Mizushima	April 1, 2024	June 24, 2024	12	Original work.	
A Journey Through Another World	Atsushi Nigorikawa	July 8, 2024	September 23, 2024	12	Adapted from a light novel series by Shizuru Minazuki. Co-animated with Bros. Bird.	
I Want to Escape from Princess Lessons	Shinobu Tagashira	January 5, 2025	March 23, 2025	12	Adapted from a light novel series by Izumi Sawano.	
Once Upon a Witch's Death	Atsushi Nigorikawa	April 1, 2025	June 17, 2025	12	Adapted from a light novel series by Saka.	
Catch Me at the Ballpark!	Jun'ichi Kitamura	April 2, 2025	June 18, 2025	12	Adapted from a manga series by Tatsurō Suga.	
The Unaware Atelier Master	Hisashi Ishii	April 6, 2025	June 22, 2025	12	Adapted from a light novel series by Yōsuke Tokino.	
The Daughter of the Demon Lord Is Too Kind!	Masahiko Ohta	January 7, 2026	March 25, 2026	12	Adapted from a manga series by Yūya Sakamoto.	
The Food Diary of Miss Maid	Ryousuke Senbo	April 5, 2026	June 21, 2026	12	Adapted from a manga series by Susumu Maeya. Co-animated with Magic Bus.	
Heroine? Saint? No, I'm an All-Works Maid (and Proud of It)!	Shinji Ishihira; Naoya Murakawa	July 1, 2026	September 16, 2026	12	Adapted from a light novel series by Atekichi.	
From Overshadowed to Overpowered	Hisashi Ishii	July 2, 2026	September 17, 2026	12	Adapted from a light novel series by Arata Shiraishi.	
The Forsaken Saintess and Her Foodie Roadtrip in Another World	Atsushi Nigorikawa	July 6, 2026	September 21, 2026	12	Adapted from a light novel series by Yoneori.	
A Pen, Handcuffs, and a Common-Law Marriage	Takaaki Ishiyama	January 10, 2027	TBA	TBA	Adapted from a manga series by Shinichi Sawaragi and Tank Gasuyama.	
My Sweet Marriage to My Ex-Nemesis	Atsushi Nigorikawa	TBA	TBA	TBA	Adapted from a light novel series by Toshimichi Uzō.	
