= Rainy Cocoa =

Japanese digital manga and anime series

- Promotional artwork for the anime.

雨色ココア (Ameiro Cocoa)
- Manga
- Published by: IAM
- Original run: May 2013 – present
- Volumes: 6
- Anime television series
- Directed by: Tomomi Mochizuki
- Music by: Kaoru Kondou
- Studio: EMT Squared
- Licensed by: Crunchyroll
- Original network: Tokyo MX, Sun TV
- Original run: 5 April 2015 – 21 June 2015
- Episodes: 12
- Anime television series

Rainy Cocoa, Welcome to Rainy Color
- Directed by: Kazuomi Koga
- Studio: EMT Squared
- Licensed by: Crunchyroll
- Original network: Tokyo MX, Sun TV
- Original run: 4 October 2015 – 27 December 2015
- Episodes: 12
- Anime television series

Rainy Cocoa in Hawaii
- Directed by: Hisashi Ishii
- Studio: EMT Squared
- Original network: Sun TV, Tokyo MX
- Original run: 2 October 2016 – 18 December 2016
- Episodes: 12
- Anime television series

Rainy Cocoa 'Amecon!!'
- Directed by: Hisashi Ishii
- Studio: EMT Squared
- Original network: Sun TV, Tokyo MX
- Original run: 4 October 2017 – 20 December 2017
- Episodes: 12
- Anime television series

Rainy Cocoa side G
- Directed by: Hisashi Ishii
- Studio: EMT Squared
- Original network: Tokyo MX, Sun TV
- Original run: 8 January 2019 – 26 March 2019
- Episodes: 12

Rainy Cocoa (雨色ココア, Ameiro Cocoa) is a bilingual Japanese digital manga series. An anime television series based on the manga began airing in April 2015, and a second season, titled Rainy Cocoa, Welcome to Rainy Color (雨色ココア Rainy colorへようこそ！, Ameiro Cocoa Rainy color e Yōkoso!), began airing in October 2015. A third season, titled Rainy Cocoa in Hawaii (雨色ココア in Hawaii, Ameiro Cocoa Rainy color Waikiki), began airing in October 2016. A fourth season, titled Rainy Cocoa Amecon!!, began airing in October 2017. A fifth season, titled Rainy Cocoa side G, began airing in January 2019.

== Characters ==
Aoi Tokura (都倉碧, Tokura Aoi)
Voiced by: Hiro Shimono
Keiichi Iwase (岩瀬啓一, Iwase Keiichi)
Voiced by: Hikaru Midorikawa
Shion Koga (古賀シオン, Koga Shion)
Voiced by: Daisuke Hirakawa
Koji Amami (天見浩司, Amami Kōji)
Voiced by: Ryo Horikawa
Ryota Sakuragi (桜木涼太, Sakuragi Ryōta)
Voiced by: Mamoru Miyano
Rain (レイン, Rein)
Voiced by: Yuko Okui
Noel Koga (古賀ノエル, Koga Noeru)
Voiced by: Kazutomi Yamamoto
Nicola Koga (古賀ニコラ, Koga Nikora)
Voiced by: Yoshitaka Yamaya
Haruka Torigoe (鳥越陽佳, Torigoe Yōka)
Voiced by: Shunya Marue
Jun Arisawa (有沢純, Arisawa Jun)
Voiced by: Shouma Yamamoto

== Media ==
=== Manga ===
The manga is available in both Japanese and English, and allows the reader to switch between the two languages for both text and audio. According to the creators, the manga's app has been downloaded from the iTunes Store and Google Play in over 50 countries.

=== Anime ===
An anime television adaptation was announced in December 2014. The series is directed by Tomomi Mochizuki, Atsuko Takahashi provides the character designs, and Kaoru Kondou is composing the series' music. The series' theme song, "Rainy Cocoa", is performed by Hiro Shimono. The series began airing on 5 April 2015, and was simulcast in North America by Funimation.

A second season was announced in June 2015, titled Rainy Cocoa, Welcome to Rainy Color (雨色ココア Rainy colorへようこそ！, Ameiro Cocoa Rainy color e Yōkoso!). Also announced was a crowdfunding campaign to raise 2 million yen to add more characters and cast members. It premiered on 4 October 2015 on Tokyo MX and Sun TV. It was accompanied by a live-action segment. The second season was also streamed by Funimation.

A third season was announced in April 2016, titled Rainy Cocoa in Hawaii (雨色ココア in Hawaii, Ameiro Cocoa Rainy color Waikiki). It premiered on 2 October 2016 on Sun TV and Tokyo MX.

A fourth season was announced in August 2017, titled Rainy Cocoa Amecon!! It premiered on 4 October 2017 on Sun TV and Tokyo MX.

A fifth season was announced in April 2018, titled Rainy Cocoa side G. It premiered on 8 January 2019 on Tokyo MX and Sun TV. Unlike previous seasons, this season has an all-female cast.

==== Episode list ====
===== Rainy Cocoa =====
No.	Title	Original release date
1	"Episode 1" (都倉碧です)	5 April 2015
2	"Episode 2" (オーナーの仕事？)	12 April 2015
3	"Episode 3" (開店準備…？)	19 April 2015
4	"Episode 4" (啓一の素顔)	26 April 2015
5	"Episode 5" (ふたりは親友!?)	3 May 2015
6	"Episode 6" (ふたりの距離（1）)	10 May 2015
7	"Episode 7" (ふたりの距離（2）)	17 May 2015
8	"Episode 8" (ふたりの距離（3）)	24 May 2015
9	"Episode 9" (ふたりの距離（4）)	31 May 2015
10	"Episode 10" (ふたりの距離（5）)	7 June 2015
11	"Episode 11" (ふたりの距離（6）)	14 June 2015
12	"Episode 12" (ふたりの距離（7）)	21 June 2015

===== Rainy Cocoa, Welcome to Rainy Color =====
No.	Title	Original release date
1	"Episode 1"	4 October 2015
2	"Episode 2"	11 October 2015
3	"Episode 3"	18 October 2015
4	"Episode 4"	25 October 2015
5	"Episode 5"	8 November 2015
6	"Episode 6"	15 November 2015
7	"Episode 7"	22 November 2015
8	"Episode 8"	29 November 2015
9	"Episode 9"	6 December 2015
10	"Episode 10"	13 December 2015
11	"Episode 11"	20 December 2015
12	"Episode 12"	27 December 2015

===== Rainy Cocoa in Hawaii =====
No.	Title	Original release date
1	"Episode 1"	2 October 2016
2	"Episode 2"	9 October 2016
3	"Episode 3"	16 October 2016
4	"Episode 4"	23 October 2016
5	"Episode 5"	30 October 2016
6	"Episode 6"	6 November 2016
7	"Episode 7"	13 November 2016
8	"Episode 8"	20 November 2016
9	"Episode 9"	27 November 2016
10	"Episode 10"	4 December 2016
11	"Episode 11"	11 December 2016
12	"Episode 12"	18 December 2016

===== Rainy Cocoa Amecon!! =====
No.	Title	Original release date
1	"Episode 1"	4 October 2017
2	"Episode 2"	11 October 2017
3	"Episode 3"	18 October 2017
4	"Episode 4"	25 October 2017
5	"Episode 5"	1 November 2017
6	"Episode 6"	8 November 2017
7	"Episode 7"	15 November 2017
8	"Episode 8"	22 November 2017
9	"Episode 9"	29 November 2017
10	"Episode 10"	6 December 2017
11	"Episode 11"	13 December 2017
12	"Episode 12"	20 December 2017

===== Rainy Cocoa side G =====
No.	Title	Original release date
1	"Episode 1"	8 January 2019
2	"Episode 2"	15 January 2019
3	"Episode 3"	22 January 2019
4	"Episode 4"	29 January 2019
5	"Episode 5"	5 February 2019
6	"Episode 6"	12 February 2019
7	"Episode 7"	19 February 2019
8	"Episode 8"	26 February 2019
9	"Episode 9"	5 March 2019
10	"Episode 10"	12 March 2019
11	"Episode 11"	19 March 2019
12	"Episode 12"	26 March 2019
