= A Pen, Handcuffs, and a Common-Law Marriage =

Japanese manga series

- First tankōbon volume cover, featuring Tsugumi Kuchinashi

ペンと手錠(ワッパ)と事実婚 (Pen to Wappa to Jijitsu Kon)
- Genre: Mystery; Romantic comedy
- Manga
- Written by: Shinichi Sawaragi
- Illustrated by: Tank Gasuyama
- Published by: Hakusensha
- English publisher: NA: Yen Press
- Imprint: Young Animal Comics
- Magazine: Young Animal
- Original run: December 23, 2022 – present
- Volumes: 7
- Anime television series
- Directed by: Takaaki Ishiyama
- Written by: Shigeru Murakoshi
- Music by: Kana Hashiguchi
- Studio: EMT Squared
- Original network: Tokyo MX, BS11
- Original run: January 10, 2027 – scheduled
- icon

A Pen, Handcuffs, and a Common-Law Marriage (Japanese: ペンと手錠(ワッパ)と事実婚, Hepburn: Pen to Wappa to Jijitsu Kon) is a Japanese manga series written by Shinichi Sawaragi and illustrated by Tank Gasuyama. It began serialization in Hakusensha's seinen manga magazine Young Animal in December 2022. An anime television series adaptation produced by EMT Squared is set to premiere in January 2027.

== Plot ==
Eiji Kirisame, a forty-year-old detective, solves crime with the help of a witness named Tsugumi Kuchinashi, a teenage girl who communicates through writing and drawings. However, Tsugumi is romantically interested in Eiji and wants to marry him.

== Characters ==
Eiji Kirisame (切鮫 鋭二, Kirisame Eiji)
Voiced by: Tomoaki Maeno
Tsugumi Kuchinashi (梔子 鶫, Kuchinashi Tsugumi)
Voiced by: Inori Minase
Wataru Kashikojima (賢島航, Kashikojima Kō)
Voiced by: Yūsuke Kobayashi
Hinade Haruyama (春山陽菜で, Haruyama Yōsaide)
Voiced by: Sumire Morohoshi
Asuka Ishimuro (石室 明日香, Ishimuro Asuka)
Voiced by: Sora Amamiya

== Media ==
=== Manga ===
Written by Shinichi Sawaragi and illustrated by Tank Gasuyama, A Pen, Handcuffs, and a Common-Law Marriage began serialization in Hakusensha's seinen manga magazine Young Animal on December 23, 2022. Its chapters have been compiled into seven tankōbon volumes as of April 2026.

During their panel at Anime NYC 2025, Yen Press announced that they had licensed the series for English publication.

No.	Original release date	Original ISBN	North American release date	North American ISBN
1	August 29, 2023	978-4-592-16408-1	March 24, 2026	979-8-8554-1791-3
Chapters 1–7
2	October 27, 2023	978-4-592-16409-8	September 22, 2026	979-8-8554-1793-7
Chapters 8–15
3	April 26, 2024	978-4-592-16410-4	December 15, 2026	979-8-8554-1795-1
4	November 26, 2024	978-4-592-16464-7	—	—
5	April 28, 2025	978-4-592-16465-4	—	—
6	October 29, 2025	978-4-592-16726-6	—	—
7	April 28, 2026	978-4-592-16727-3	—	—
8	December 25, 2026	978-4-592-16737-2	—	—

=== Anime ===
An anime television series adaptation was announced on April 17, 2026. It will be produced by EMT Squared and directed by Takaaki Ishiyama, with series composition handled by Shigeru Murakoshi, characters designed by Miyuki Nakamura, and music composed by Kana Hashiguchi. The series is set to premiere on January 10, 2027, on Tokyo MX and BS11. (Note: Tokyo MX listed the air dates for the season on Saturday at 25:00, which is effectively Sunday at 1:00 JST.) The opening theme song is "Mikaiketsu de, Romance de" (みかいけつで、ロマンスで; lit. 'Unsolved and Romantic'), performed by Inori Minase, and the ending theme song is "Message", performed by saeco.
