= The Forsaken Saintess and Her Foodie Roadtrip in Another World =

Japanese light novel series

- First light novel volume cover

捨てられ聖女の異世界ごはん旅 隠れスキルでキャンピングカーを召喚しました (Suterare Seijo no Isekai Gohantabi: Kakure Sukiru de Kanpingu Kā o Shōkan Shimashita)
- Genre: Gourmet, isekai
- Novel series

Suterare Isekai Seikatsu wa Camping Car to Tomo ni
- Written by: Yoneori
- Published by: Shōsetsuka ni Narō
- Original run: June 28, 2019 – February 7, 2021
- Light novel
- Written by: Yoneori
- Illustrated by: Akane Nito
- Published by: Fujimi Shobo
- Imprint: Kadokawa Books
- Original run: April 10, 2020 – present
- Volumes: 7
- Manga
- Written by: Yoneori
- Illustrated by: Nana Kogami
- Published by: Enterbrain
- Imprint: B's Log Comics
- Magazine: B's Log Comic
- Original run: September 5, 2020 – present
- Volumes: 4
- Anime television series
- Directed by: Atsushi Nigorikawa
- Written by: Takashi Aoshima
- Music by: Kana Utatane
- Studio: EMT Squared
- Licensed by: Sentai Filmworks; SEA: Medialink
- Original network: AT-X, BS NTV, CBC, Tokyo MX
- Original run: July 6, 2026 – September 21, 2026
- Episodes: 12

The Forsaken Saintess and Her Foodie Roadtrip in Another World (Japanese: 捨てられ聖女の異世界ごはん旅 隠れスキルでキャンピングカーを召喚しました, Hepburn: Suterare Seijo no Isekai Gohantabi: Kakure Sukiru de Kanpingu Kā o Shōkan Shimashita; "The Abandoned Saint's Otherworldly Food Journey: I Summoned a Camper Van with My Hidden Skill") is a Japanese web novel series written by Yoneori. It was originally serialized on the online publication platform Shōsetsuka ni Narō from June 2019 to February 2021, before being picked up for serialization by Fujimi Shobo, which began publishing it as a light novel under their Kadokawa Books imprint in April 2020 with illustrations by Akane Nito. A manga adaptation illustrated by Nana Kogami began serialization on Enterbrain's B's Log Comic website in September 2020. An anime television series adaptation produced by EMT Squared aired from July to September 2026.

== Plot ==
Rin Takanashi was coming home from a fishing trip when a hole suddenly appeared below her, swallowing her in. She finds herself summoned to another world, but her summoners found her skill to be useless and sent her away. Finding herself in another world, she summons a camping van, allowing her to continue her camping activities. Armed with her new vehicle, she drives around and forms her own party through people she encounters along the way, finding purpose in having a food trip in her new world. She eventually discovers that this new world is actually based on an otome game.

== Characters ==
Rin Takanashi (小鳥遊 倫, Takanashi Rin)
Voiced by: Sora Tokui (Japanese); Kira Vincent-Davis (English)
Known mononymously as Rin (リン). A 30-year-old acupuncturist with a lifelong interest in camping and fishing. She previously worked as a caregiver. After she finds herself in another world, she was dismissed after her summoners deem her unneeded. She gains an ability called Survival, which allows her to identify dangers as well as adapt and survive in environments no matter how rough they are, and the ability to summon a camper van (which she dubs “Campy”) at any time as long as it is outdoors, which her group uses as transportation. Rin can also use it to protect herself and others from monsters and hazards. Though she is a great cook, she is incapable of fighting. She develops feelings for Ville and joins his party so she can get currency and identification.
Campy has its own special abilities: it is bigger on the inside, the contents in its fridge can magically restock, it has an endless supply of water that can magically clean itself after use, and it can turn invisible to those that Rin doesn't know so to avoid drawing unwanted attention. It also runs on magic, not fuel.
Ville (ヴィル, Viru)
Voiced by: Yūki Ono (Japanese); Gabriel Regojo (English)
A handsome ogre with magical abilities that Rin encounters one day after rescuing him from a lake. He is a major glutton and needs to eat a lot. After Rin saved him, he has her join his party and travel together. He also develops feelings for Rin. Because the world that he lives in is an otome game, he and his party are unaware that they are NPCs.
Senon (セノン)
Voiced by: Shinnosuke Tachibana (Japanese); Scott Gibbs (English)
An elf who serves as the party's healer. He is also a major glutton. It is hinted that he also has feelings for Rin.
Aria (アリア)
Voiced by: Sumire Morohoshi (Japanese); Skyler Sinclair (English)
A woman who is an arachne and serves as the party's scout. She develops an attachment to Rin, making Ed jealous.
Ed (エド, Eddo)
Voiced by: Shōya Chiba (Japanese); Greg Ayres (English)
Aria's husband, who serves as the party's alchemist. He is deeply attached to her and grows jealous of her doting Rin.
Gomamiso (ごまみそ)
Voiced by: Kaede Hondo (Japanese); Brittney Karbowski (English)
A winged cat who becomes the party's pet. She is attached to Rin and can telepathy communicate with her. It is later revealed that she is the guardian of a dungeon core, but she gave up this role because she wanted to travel.
Sheila (シーラ, Shīra)
Voiced by: Yukari Tamura (Japanese); Nickolette Kong (English)
The kobold receptionist who works in Elrage's guild for 20 years.
Tori (トーリ, Tōri)
Voiced by: Kanehira Yamamoto (Japanese); Andrew Love (English)
The guildmaster of Elrage's guild.
Lente
Voiced by: (Japanese); Shannon Emerick (English)
A werecat who was part of a party called Lucky Clover that Smorgasbord saved from a firebear.
Lyon
A lionfolk who is a member of Lucky Clover. She is a little pushy.
Raya
The head priest of the church that Lucky Clover works at.
Aigure
The guild master of Merlova.
Miru
A dragon princess that had a relationship with a miko. She was given her name by Rin. She also guards a sacred hot spring, which she was born near. She is also a glutton and grows attached to Rin.
Noah
Ville's half-brother and the ruler of Shurblanc. He is actually a reincarnated human from Earth and his original name is Takumi Yamamoto. He is also aware that the world that he and Rin are in is an otome game, and Noah himself is the Demon Lord, the game's final boss, though he has no interest in doing evil deeds.

== Media ==
=== Light novel ===
Written by Yoneori, the series began on the online publication platform Shōsetsuka ni Narō under the title Suterare Isekai Seikatsu wa Camping Car to Tomo ni (捨てられ異世界生活はキャンピングカーと共に), posting 134 chapters between June 28, 2019, to February 7, 2021, before later renamed to its current title in preparation for its publication as a light novel series. It was picked up and published by Fujimi Shobo as a light novel under its Kadokawa Books imprint; the novels feature illustrations by Akane Nito, with the first volume was released on April 10, 2020. Seven volumes have been released as of July 10, 2026.

No.	Japanese release date	Japanese ISBN
1	April 10, 2020	978-4-04-073645-7
2	September 10, 2020	978-4-04-073788-1
3	June 10, 2021	978-4-04-074038-6
4	January 8, 2022	978-4-04-074353-0
5	March 10, 2023	978-4-04-074587-9
6	May 10, 2024	978-4-04-075420-8
7	July 10, 2026	978-4-04-075849-7

=== Manga ===
A manga adaptation illustrated by Nana Kogami began serialization on Enterbrain's B's Log Comic website on September 5, 2020, with the first tankōbon volume released on June 1, 2021. Four volumes have been released as of May 30, 2025.

No.	Japanese release date	Japanese ISBN
1	June 1, 2021	978-4-04-736656-5
2	June 1, 2022	978-4-04-737074-6
3	June 1, 2023	978-4-04-737525-3
4	May 30, 2025	978-4-04-738242-8

=== Anime ===
An anime television series adaptation was announced on March 18, 2026. It is produced by EMT Squared and directed by Atsushi Nigorikawa, with Takashi Aoshima handling series composition, Izumi Ishii designing the characters and Kana Utatane composing the music. The series aired from July 6 to September 21, 2026, on AT-X and other networks. The opening theme song is "Butterfly" performed by Inuwasi, and the ending theme song is "Holy Sweet Home" performed by Onkan Lemonade. Sentai Filmworks licensed the series in North America for streaming on Hidive. Medialink licensed the series in Southeast Asia.

==== Episodes ====
No.	Title	Directed by	Written by	Storyboarded by	Original release date
1	"Trout Fishing in Another World! ~With a Side of Hot Oni~"; Transliteration: "Isekai Torauto Ipponzuri! ~Oni-san Soete~" (Japanese: 異世界トラウト一本釣り！ ～鬼さん添えて～)	Fumio Maezono	Takashi Aoshima	Yūko Kiyoshima	July 6, 2026
A young woman named Rin Takanashi is busy fishing at the side of a lake in a fantasy world when she reels out a handsome ogre named Ville, who possesses magical abilities. After offering him some food, the two introduce each other. Ville reveals that he fell into a river when trying to get food as a result of a monster stealing his things and Rin reveals that she came from Earth. After Rin was transported to this fantasy world by a group of mages along with a female high school student, the mages believe that the student is the saint that they are meant to call forth while exiling Rin to the lakeside after deeming her useless. Rin has decided to continue her camping trip here. Besides being a skilled cook, Rin possesses a skill called Survival that allows her to adapt and survive in rough environments and identify dangers. She can also summon a camper van (which she has named "Campy"), but only if it is outdoors. Campy is bigger on the inside, its refrigerator can magically restock food, and the water supply is unlimited and self-cleaning. After enjoying another meal, the two start to develop feelings for each other. However, Rin has no money, identification, or job, so Ville decides to hire her to help provide meals for his party. After being ambushed by hostile crows, Rin is unable to fight, and Ville quickly defeats them. Defeated monsters also drop collectables. While traveling on Campy to reach a city called Elrage, Rin reveals that the camper has a masking function that makes it invisible to people. Fearing that they might hit someone, they take a detour through the mountains, but encounter a Firebear, which isn't supposed to be in this area. They are saved by Ville's party Smorgasbord, consisting of Aria, her husband Ed, and Xenon. Ville steps out of Campy to help them.
2	"Combine Your Friends and Ingredients for a Tasty Rice Dish!"	Sōta Jō	Takashi Aoshima	Sōta Jō	July 13, 2026
After the party defeat the Firebear, Ville's group explain that they too encountered the Firebear after saving another group. Rin comes out of Campy, which is invisible to them. Ville introduces Rin to them and reveals that she can cook. After cooking a meal for the group, Aria takes a liking to Rin, making Ed jealous. Rin makes Campy visible to the party. While traveling on Campy, Ville explains his origins and where he came from. Arriving in Elrage, Rin is amazed by the citizens. In the guild, Rin finds the receptionist, whose name is Sheela, cute since she is a kobold. Rin is made a member of Smorgasbord, but discovers that she can understand and write the world's language as if they were Japanese. Rin and Ville next meet Torey, the guildmaster, and tell him about how Rin was brought here. Torey also explains that those who came from Earth are given special skills and suspects that their encounter with the Firebear was no coincidence, requesting for Smorgasbord to help protect the city. The party then rent a house in the city. Rin then makes another meal for the group.
3	"War on the Water! Seafood Barbeque!"	Atsushi Nigorikawa	Takashi Aoshima	Noriyuki Nakamura	July 20, 2026
Rin is enjoying her new life in this world. Smorgasbord decide to start by searching the beach. Lente, a werecat who was part of the group that the party saved from the firebear, arrives to thank them as he and his group made it back home safely. Rin gives him cookies, but this makes the others jealous. Rin makes more cookies for them and takes them to the beach on Campy. Arriving, Rin makes lunch while the team catch fish for her to cook. Ed is further jealous of Aria bonding with Rin. An elf later arrives to ask them for help. They find an orca who is stranded on the beach. The orca telepathically speaks to Rin, revealing that it got stuck after trying to prank the elf's group. It promises a reward if they help it; however, it is too heavy to move. Ed makes water cubes to keep the orca cool. They then get the idea to create a moat that will allow the orca to return to the ocean. An octopus-like monster called a Baby Ploop attacks them, as it is targeting the orca. Rin tells them to attack between its eyes. The group manage to defeat the Baby Ploop and return the orca to the ocean and it rewards them with a large supply of sea creatures to cook. Rin is also given a strange necklace. Later that evening, Rin cooks the sea creatures for dinner and the party is grateful of her. Meanwhile, a cave has opened up and a monster lurks inside it.
4	"The Food Demon Descends! Thou Art Tartar Sauce!"	Yoshitaka Koyama	Saeka Fujimoto	Yūko Kiyoshima	July 27, 2026
Sheela arrives at Smorgasbord's house to inform the team of a problem. Visiting Torey, they learn of a dungeon that had recently appeared and that monsters are emerging from it. Suspecting that the Firebear and the Baby Ploop are connected to this, the party agree to investigate. Sheela first helps Rin with shopping. Afterwards, Aria reveals that she has a third eye before the team reunite and head for the dungeon; Rin has no need to use Campy as the dungeon is close to the city, revealed to be the same cave from the previous episode. Entering the cave, Ed defeats a Flower Lizard. They then meet a winged cat who takes a liking to Rin, who feeds the cat. Rin adapts the winged cat and names her Gomamiso, but discovers that she can hear her voice while the others could not. Rin feels that she is holding the party back, but Ville insists otherwise. Aria helps clear a trap. Sensing a monster approaching, Rin and Gomamiso take refuge inside of Campy. The monster is a Cockatrice, a chicken-like monster with a snake-like tail, which has poisonous breath. Xenon shields everyone with his magic before the team kill it. Rin uses its meat to cook a meal with Ville's help. Aria also tries vegetables for the first time.
5	"Listen Up, Boys! It's a Dungeon Meat Fest!"	Mio Nishimura & Yurina Utsugi	Saeka Fujimoto	Masakazu Amiya	August 3, 2026
As the group fight a monster called a Wild Ox in the middle of an open field in the dungeon, Rin finds it weird for a dungeon to have an open field with sunlight. As Rin uses the Wild Ox's meat to cook a meal, Ville and Xenon help her and Xenon explains his capabilities as an elf. Rin is surprised that they eat raw meat and she warns them that eating raw meat is dangerous. Ed and Aria return with more food supplies. Ed reveals that the monsters in this part of the dungeon are similar to the Firebear. Aria deducts that the whole field is an illusion which may cause them to get lost. Rin accidentally springs a trap that summons magical automatons. Rin and Gomamiso hide inside of Campy as the group fight the automatons. After the automatons are defeated, the party grow concerned about Rin, but she is alright though. Rin serves up another meal for the group. After destroying most of the magical hotspots, the illusionary field begins to malfunction as the hotspots are keeping it intact, but Rin has a bad feeling about what's going to happen next. Goblins suddenly attack them, but the party are able to defeat them and destroy the final hotspot. The illusionary field disappears, revealing a normal cave. The group find a set of stairs going down. Below is a snowy area. They see a building up ahead. Because Gomamiso and Aria can't handle cold climates, they have to take shelter inside of Campy as Rin tries to warm Aria up. Rin serves up moxa to help keep everyone warm, though she has to explain it to them as moxa doesn't exist in this world. After Aria feels better, Rin serves up hot cocoa before the group head on to the mysterious building, encountering more hazards along the way. Upon arrival, they proceed to enter the building.
6	"We Love Conger Eel, but We Love Freshwater Eel, Too!"	Atsushi Nigorikawa	Saeka Fujimoto	Atsushi Nigorikawa	August 10, 2026
Inside the building, they find the place seemly empty. Xenon explains the history of the race who previously lived here. Behind a door up ahead is a room with a marble tree in a water basin. After studying the room, Rin deducts that they must put something in the grooves on the tree branches. After pushing wall cravings of two birds that have only one wing, they obtain bird statues that they insert in the grooves, causing the water to drain out of the basin and flood the room. This also awakens a Storm Eel, which can control the weather. Using her knowledge of her previous world, Rin uses bait from Campy to lure in the eel, allowing Ed and Wille to kill it. A gateway appears and on the other side is a colosseum. Gomamiso, now able to speak to the others, senses something and reveals the dungeon core, also explaining that this is her home and its her job to protect the core. After taking on a larger form, the team decide that they need to fight her, but Gomamiso decides to end her duty and destroy the core herself. This causes the dungeon to collapse as they escape and return to Elrage. The party are amazed that Rin and Gomamiso have bonded so well, but Gomamiso can no longer speak to anyone other than Rin. Their next mission is in the capital, which is ruled by Ville's half-brother. Ville reveals that he fled the capital to avoid the uncomfortable conflicts. Back at base, they recall the saintess that was summoned in the past and suspect that the recent monsters that appeared are connected to Rin's summoning. Rin shows Campy to Sheela and Torey as she cooks them a meal with the eel meat. The party then prepare to head to the capital.
7	"The Mochi Dango on My Hip, Give Them All to Me"	Toshiteru Masamoto	Kenji Sugihara	Daiki Maezawa	August 17, 2026
While Rin, Gomamiso, and Ville are out shopping, Rin is amazed by all the food on sale, but she also suspects that Ville isn't too happy about going to the capital the following day. They meet Lente again, who invites them to go to the church that he works at. Once there, they meet Lyon, a lionfolk who is a member of Lente's party, who is at first rude towards them until learning who they really are. Rin cooks a meal for them and eventually comes up with an idea to improve the dish. This also gets the attention of some orphans, who also want to try the dish. They also meet Raya, the head priest of the church, who is amazed by Rin's dishes. Ville and Rin are given gifts in return for Rin's amazing cooking, which Rin reluctantly accepts. They then visit a restaurant to get something to eat. After enjoying the meal, Rin wishes to buy the fish that the restaurant uses, and the owner agrees. Afterwards, they reunite with Ed and Aria, who inform them about another monster attack. Xenon also reunites with the party carrying some products that he bought. Torey then arrives with a favor, to which they have to talk while eating. Torey requests for them to deliver some documents to a guild in a city called Merlowa, which is en-route to the capital, for him. They agree, and the group share meals with Rin.
8	"Stew & Ikura: "Who Do You Choose, Me or Her?!" Rice: "I Love You Both!""	Yūji Kanzaki	Kenji Sugihara	Daiki Maezawa	August 24, 2026
While fishing near a lake, which is the same spot where Rin first met Ville, a monster called a Mad Otter attacks the group, but they manage to kill it. As they travel on Campy, they see a volcano erupting in the distance. They later set up camp and Rin prepares dinner using the otter's meat. She also shows new kinds of dishes using fish and rice. The next day, they resume their travels. The group remember how hard it was to find meals before meeting Rin. They reach Merlowa and recall a certain meal that they liked. They stop at a restaurant for lunch and deliver some documents from Torey to Aigure, the guild master of Merlova. She requests help in dealing with a monster that is lurking in the nearby springs, which is where a special type of salt comes from. The party agree to help and head there on Campy. Rin also learns about a dragon that lives in the volcano and had a relationship with a miko. They encounter some volcanic slimes and a warm water lizard, which they kill since it is editable. They use a steam vent to cook the lizard's meat as Rin prepares another meal. However, Rin is captured by the dragon that was mentioned earlier, who thinks Rin is his attendant.
9	"Smooth Resolution and Happy Reconciliation Because It's Tempura After All"	Masayuki Iimura	Kenji Sugihara	Yūko Kiyoshima	August 31, 2026
The group prepare to go after the dragon. Meanwhile, the dragon is revealed to be a princess and she needs Rin to attend her as she thought Rin is the same miko that Ville mentioned. The dragon is given the name Miru and Rin decides to make a meal for her as the party rush to find her. Rin remembers the gifts she got from the orca and Raya, and realizes that they are blessings that people have when meeting dragons. Rin uses the storm eel's meat to cook the meal and learns that Miru was born here. The reason why she drives people away is to protect the sacred hot springs nearby. Ville's group arrive to rescue Rin before the latter clears up the misunderstanding. Rin uses the hot springs to cook eggs and reveals that they can give Miru food in exchange for the hot springs water. Miru doesn't like the idea, but Rin reveals that they will run out of ingredients if she doesn't allow it. Miru finally agrees, but will only let them take some of the water if they can get her a Hell Catfish from the nearby Hell Swamp and cook a meal for her with it. Heading to the swamp, they manage to catch the Hell Catfish and use it to cook the meal for everyone and Miru. Rin also tells Miru about the salt that the nearby town uses to make ingredients, which is why they need the water. Miru accepts the terms and gives off a strange aura, which is Illusion Magic that she can create. Rin is then given one of Miru's scales as should they need to return to the hot springs, they must see her first. The group later enjoy the hot springs.
10	"Haha, It's Tartar Sauce Time Again! Having It Again After Five Episodes"	Yoshitaka Koyama & Yūki Yamaguchi	Takashi Aoshima	Koichi Ohata	September 7, 2026
A mysterious man learns of Rin's actions and is eager to meet her. Meanwhile, Rin's group are still traveling onboard Campy, but have to stop when Ville warns them of fogbird monsters, bird/mushroom hybrid creatures, that he spotted. As Ville leaves to hunt the monsters, the others suspect that he doesn't want to see his brother. Rin cooks them a meal using tartar sauce, though they end up burning their mouths due to Rin making them too hot. Xenon uses his magic to heal their mouths. That night, Rin talks with Ville regarding their siblings. Rin doesn't wish to go home yet and instead wants to solve the Saint Summoning Mystery first as she has grown attached to this new world. The next day, they reach the capital: Shurblanc, and Rin is given a tour. She also learns that Smorgasbord used to live here. Ville is then given a note from his brother, inviting them to a meeting. Entering a secret passage, they arrive in a luxurious room where a butler greets them and reveals that Noah, Ville's brother and the mysterious man from earlier, is curious about Rin. However, only Rin is allowed to go see Noah, so she goes into his headquarters alone while the others wait outside. After revealing that they're in Shurblanc's castle, Noah explains that he is Takumi Yamamoto, a human from Earth who died from overwork and was reborn in this world, while also saying that Ville and his group do not know about his origins. He also tells Rin about an otome game called Wild Rose Maiden, which she has not heard of. Noah says that the game contains several events that are eerily similar to the ones Rin experienced in this world, ultimately revealing that this world is the world of Wild Rose Maiden.
11	"A Midnight Cuban Sandwich Tastes Like Sin!"	Sōta Jō	Takashi Aoshima	Daiki Maezawa	September 14, 2026
Noah explains that the plot of Wild Rose Maiden is for the main character to defeat him as he plays the role of the Demon Lord, the game's final boss. Rin dislikes the food that he gives out. Noah further explains about the conflicts between humans and demi-humans in the game's fictional history and the Saint Summoning is to call forth a main character to defeat the final boss; Rin is not an intentional summon. After revealing how powerups are gained in this world, Rin begins to understand the point of the dropped items. After Noah tells Rin about Smorgasbord's role in the game, the party arrives to join the conversation. Noah reveals that he deeply cares for Ville and tells the group about the Saint Summoning and that the Saint and her party are coming to kill him. The party agree to help Noah with a mission and set off to a village on Campy as they continue to discuss the role of the Saint. They reach the village just as bat creatures arrive, but they do not attack. As they talk to the village mayor, Rin sees that the bat monsters appeared when she was summoned to this world. Rin, Gomamiso, and Aria befriend a little girl before the party set off to find the bat monsters' cave. They learn that the creatures feed on mad hornets, which are growing bigger. Finding the hornets' hive, the group take down the giant bugs and go into the hive where they confront the queen, which Ville slays and they obtain a magic stone from it, which is the cause of the hornets' massive size and is connected to the Saint Summoning missions. The group next kill the bats, bid the villagers farewell, and enjoy a meal made by Rin. They still have one more mission: to investigate a secret dungeon. In a flashback, Noah reveals that Smorgasbord are all NPCs and is worried that they may not survive in the dungeon that they must go to next and requests Rin to protect them.
12	"Otsu-curry-sama! But the Adventure Continues, On and On!"	Yūji Kanzaki	Takashi Aoshima	Atsushi Nigorikawa	September 21, 2026
The party arrive at the dungeon to search for an orb used to empower the Saint and only a person from another world can disable it, which is a job for Rin. Inside the dungeon, they face off against a variety of monsters, but Rin, worried about the team due to monsters endlessly spawning, decides to give them a lift across the floor using Campy before providing them with a meal. The group see how useful Rin's skill is. As they continue their way through the dungeon, they reach a door that they cannot open. However, Rin is able to open it as she isn't from this world. Behind it is a room with an alter, but it is empty. They learn that an offering must be made here. When a magic circle appears, the group prepare to face the monster on the other side as they step into the circle. The boss waiting for them is a dragon. Seeing that the dragon is editable, Rin gives them advice, enabling them to kill it. Returning to the alter, they offer most of the dragon's meat to it and the orb appears. The group bring it back to Noah, who is grateful that Rin saved Ville and his party. He joins them with eating another meal. Rin agrees to continue her travels with the group

== Reception ==
It was reported that the series had over 600,000 copies in circulation as of August 2025.
