= BS Fuji =

Japanese satellite television channel

- Logo used since 2008
- Type: Free-to-air satellite
- Country: Japan
- Headquarters: Odaiba, Minato, Tokyo

Programming
- Language: Japanese
- Picture format: 1080i HDTV

Ownership
- Owner: Fuji Satellite Broadcasting, Inc.
- Key people: Chihiro Kameyama (president and CEO)

History
- Launched: December 1, 2000; 25 years ago

Links
- Website: bsfuji.tv

BS Fuji (BSフジ) is a Japanese satellite broadcasting television channel owned by Fuji Satellite Broadcasting, Inc. (Note: Japanese: 株式会社ビーエスフジ, Hepburn: Kabushiki-gaisha Bīesu Fuji), a wholly owned subsidiary of Fuji Media Holdings. The LCN is "8" from Fuji Television's analog master station, channel 8, which is also the digital channel number used for most of its affiliates.

== Overview ==
BS Fuji is one of the five commercial BS digital broadcasting stations that opened simultaneously on December 1, 2000. In January 2006, it became the first commercial BS digital station to achieve a monthly profit. Also, in the fiscal year ending March 2007, it was in the black (net income of 179 million yen), along with BS Japan (currently BS TV Tokyo). On March 21, 2006, LFX488 (Nippon Broadcasting System) and BSQR (Nippon Cultural Broadcasting's BS station) ended their broadcasts due to the decision to reduce BS digital audio broadcasting and independent data broadcasting due to a review of the Broadcasting Popularization Basic Plan.

As of October 1, 2008, Fuji Television, the largest shareholder, became Fuji Media Holdings, a certified broadcasting holding company, and transitioned to a holding company system. On November 2, 2010, the board of directors of Fuji Media Holdings and BS Fuji resolved to make Fuji Media Holdings a wholly owned subsidiary through a stock exchange on April 1, 2011. Furthermore, after becoming a wholly owned subsidiary, the capital was reduced by 80% (24.8 billion yen) free of charge, and the new capital is expected to be 6.2 billion yen. As of April 1, 2011, it became a wholly owned subsidiary of Fuji Media Holdings through a stock exchange. On August 8 of the same year, Fuji Media Holdings reduced the capital of BS Fuji free of charge, eliminating accumulated losses of 23,607 million yen (as of the end of March 2010).

In terms of financial results for the fiscal year ending March 2016, it was the top commercial BS digital station, with sales of 16.761 billion yen and net profit of 1.668 billion yen, both sales and profits increasing. On December 1, 2018, BS Fuji started 4K UHD broadcasts.

The network has also co-produced programs with JIB TV, which airs its slots periodically on NHK World Japan.
