= Nanbaka =

Japanese manga and anime series

- The cover of the first volume featuring Jyugo.

ナンバカ
- Genre: Comedy
- Manga
- Written by: Shō Futamata
- Published by: Futabasha
- English publisher: Crunchyroll Manga (expired)
- Magazine: Comico Japan
- Original run: 13 October 2013 – 25 July 2022
- Volumes: 8
- Anime television series
- Directed by: Shinji Takamatsu
- Written by: Mitsutaka Hirota
- Studio: Satelight
- Licensed by: Crunchyroll
- Original network: MBS, Tokyo MX, BS11
- Original run: 5 October 2016 – 28 December 2016
- Episodes: 13
- Original net animation
- Directed by: Shinji Takamatsu
- Written by: Mitsutaka Hirota
- Studio: Satelight
- Licensed by: Crunchyroll
- Released: 4 January 2017 – 22 March 2017
- Episodes: 12
- Original video animation
- Directed by: Shinji Takamatsu
- Written by: Mitsutaka Hirota
- Studio: Satelight
- Licensed by: Crunchyroll
- Released: 29 April 2017

Nanbaka (ナンバカ), also known as Nanbaka - The Numbers, is a Japanese manga series written and illustrated by Shō Futamata. An anime television series adaptation by Satelight aired between 5 October 2016 and 22 March 2017. The title is a play on words, combining the name of the prison, which is the Japanese transcription of the word "number", and the Japanese word "baka" for "fool" or "idiot".

== Premise ==
The story centers around four young men who are assigned to Nanba Prison, the world's most formidable prison. Jyugo, who attempted to break out of prison and ended up extending his jail time; Uno, a gambling fanatic who likes women; Rock, who likes eating and fighting; and Nico, an ex-drug addict who happens to be an otaku. The action follows the daily lives of the prison's inmates and guards.

== Characters ==
=== Cell 13 ===
Jyugo (ジューゴ, Jūgo)
Voiced by: Yūto Uemura (Japanese); Daman Mills (English)
Inmate number 1315. He is of Japanese descent, has black hair with red streaks at the end, and has heterochromia; his left eye is green and his right eye is violet. He is confident, cheerful, impulsive and gets bored easily. He is skilled at picking any kind of mechanical or electronic lock. The sole exceptions are the shackles on his neck, wrists and ankles which were placed on him mysteriously when he was asleep by a guard with a scar on the back of his neck. His father was inmate number 610 at Nanba Prison and known as "the shame of Nanba Prison". He hates the guard who placed the shackles on him, and longs to find him and have them removed. He states that he has to be in Nanba Prison as he has been to all other prisons. His name just means 'fifteen'.
Uno (ウノ)
Voiced by: Tetsuya Kakihara (Japanese); Alejandro Saab (English)
Inmate number 1311. He is of British descent, has a long braid, wears a hat, loves women and gambling, and often has a pair of cards on hand. He has a great intuition and is able to make bets on what outcome will occur using his observational skills, luck and intuition. He is kind and outgoing (to the point of being silly) but can be blunt. He is often the one who keeps the others in line when Hajime is not around, and Nico jokes that he is starting to act like he is their mother. He is also very loyal to Jyugo, whom he claims saved his life and gave him his freedom back. After Jyugo is beaten within an inch of his life by Hajime, he holds a deep anger against Hajime, stating he could never come to like prison guards. He broke out of his previous prisons because he had dates to attend.
Rock (ロック, Rokku)
Voiced by: Airu Shiozaki (Japanese); Jarrod Greene (English)
Inmate number 1369. He is American, has a mohawk, wears long feather earnings, and is the physically largest of his fellow cell mates. He loves fighting and eating and is incredibly strong, with only some of the supervisors being stronger. He can be short tempered and impulsive, but cares for his friends, and mostly remains peaceful and happy. He met Jyugo when the other inmate saved him from starving to death in the first prison he was sent to. He escaped other prisons because the food was terrible, but likes the cooking at Nanba Prison.
Nico (ニコ, Niko)
Voiced by: Daiki Kobayashi (Japanese); Justin Briner (English)
Inmate number 1325. An American effeminate short male with green hair and bandages on the right side of his body, predominantly on the right side of his face. He has a chain ball shackled to his right leg. He grew up in the slums, where he was a drug mule, and has escaped multiple prisons primarily because they tried to inject his medicine into him. He is calm at Nanba Prison as the medicine is taken orally and is flavored. Drugs have an unusual effect on him and rather than incapacitate him, they have alternate side effects. He rarely takes anything seriously and is rather childish and happy-go-lucky. He is a huge anime fan. In the second season, it is revealed why he is so ill and dependent on medication. As a child, a drug gang used him to test their products, which made him develop several unknown illnesses. After being arrested, the doctors at the first prison he was sent to performed painful, invasive medical experiments on him under the guise of trying to help him get better, which only made him more ill. After spending years locked in the prison infirmary, he eventually sunk into a deep depression and wished that he could die, until Jyugo freed him and helped him develop an interest in life again. In episode 21, it is revealed that he has a violent split personality that will emerge if his health problems are not kept under control with his medications, but he is unaware of its existence.

=== Nanba Prison guards ===
Hajime Sugoroku (双六 一, Sugoroku Hajime)
Voiced by: Tomokazu Seki (Japanese); Ian Sinclair (English)
The Building 13 Supervising Officer. A tall, strong and serious bald man who takes his job very seriously and has a cross shaped scar on the left side of his face. He likes shogi and has a black belt in judo. He is likened to a gorilla. He is annoyed by the antics of the Cell 13 inmates and often intercepts them before they escape the prison. He is said to be the strongest of all supervisors in the prison. He is willing to do anything his job dictates, even kill if need be. He is very suspicious of Jyugo, not just because of his father.
Momoko Hyakushiki (百式 百子, Hyakushiki Momoko)
Voiced by: Satomi Akesaka (Japanese); Marissa Lenti (English)
The prison warden. She is an intimidating and serious woman with long blue hair and has a crush on Hajime. She is particularly watchful of Jyugo, son of the man known as the "eternal fugitive".
Mitsuru Hitokoe (一声 三鶴, Hitokoe Mitsuru)
Voiced by: Kenjiro Tsuda (Japanese); Ricco Fajardo (English)
The chief broadcaster. Often covers for Building 13 as a guard when the prisoners escape. He has dark skin, a loud rock star-like personality and usually hosts the events at the prison, such as the New Year's Tournament. He sometimes serves as the narrator for the episodes, often saying things like, "Remember this is still a comedy anime!", when things get serious in the plot. He knows about Momoko's crush on Hajime and is often beaten up by her for daring to tease her about it.
Kiji Mitsuba (三葉 キジ, Mitsuba Kiji)
Voiced by: Kimeru (Japanese); J. Michael Tatum (English)
The Building 3 Supervising Officer. He wears a lot of make up and has a somewhat effeminate personality. He insists he is not homosexual despite his personality and appearance. He is likened to a pheasant.
Kenshiro Yozakura (四桜 犬士郎, Yozakura Kenshirō)
Voiced by: Shouma Yamamoto (Japanese); Vic Mignogna (English)
The Building 4 Supervising Officer. He has a crush on Momoko and is well aware that she has a crush on Hajime. He longs to exceed Hajime in order to prove himself to Momoko. He is likened to a dog. His preferred weapon is his whip. He is a hard worker and was a police officer before coming to Nanba Prison. It is suggested that he tried to bring attention to the crimes against prisoners to his superiors while working as a police officer.
Samon Gokuu (悟空 猿門, Gokū Samon)
Voiced by: Sōichirō Hoshi (Japanese); Brandon McInnis (English)
The Building 5 Supervising Officer. He has orange hair with green tips, and a red belt used for a tail-like appearance. He is likened to a monkey. He is calm and trusting most of the time, although he is known to become loud and obnoxious when annoyed. Despite this, it is eventually revealed that he actually cares for the prisoners in Building 5 quite a great deal, as he helped Upa reconnect with his family after he was arrested in China, and later took Liang under his wing when the inmate was first transferred to Nanba Prison. In season 2, it is revealed that he has an older brother, Enki, who was the former supervising officer of Building 5; Enki was very popular among both the other guards and the prisoners, however, he secretly tortured and abused the inmates in his care, eventually murdering one of them and going on a rampage when his colleagues tried to arrest him. Samon still struggles to comprehend how his brother could do the things he did, and is often taunted by the other guards, who accuse him of being a traitor like his brother was. He becomes irritated when compared to his older brother, and when Hajime is mentioned, he sees Hajime as competition, who was able to capture Enki, while Samon himself hesitated. Enki is a painful reminder of how strong he feels he needs to be.
Yamato Godai (五代 大和, Godai Yamato)
Voiced by: Shunsuke Takeuchi (Japanese); Marcus Stimac (English)
The Building 13 Deputy Supervisor. He appears to be a tall, well-built Japanese man and is rather friendly and silly, often laughing. He has a horrible sense of direction and loves working out. He is very strong and often trains with Tsukumo.
Seitarou Tanabata (七夕星太郎, Tanabata Seitarō)
Voiced by: Keito Okuyama (Japanese); Dallas Reid (English)
A Building 13 guard under Hajime who often stresses over the fact that the Cell 13 inmates often try to escape. He is a bit of a worrywart and an easy target for the Cell 13 inmates to bully but is otherwise a pleasant person who takes his job seriously. He has long blue hair. He is described as a pretty boy.
Inori Hakkai (八戒猪里, Hakkai Inori)
Voiced by: Mitsutaka Itakura (Japanese); Randy E. Aguebor (English)
The Building 5 Deputy Supervisor under Samon. His face is boar-like, having teeth that mimic such. In season 2, it is revealed that he is actually a mole working for his former supervising officer Enki, when he frees Enki and the prisoners allied with him from their underground cells. He says that he is working with Enki because he wants to see Samon dead, due to how the other guard was chosen as the new Building 5 supervising officer over him; he considers Samon to be weak and cowardly in comparison to his older brother, and detests having to take orders from him.
Enki Gokuu (悟空 猿鬼, Gokū Enki)
Voiced by: Takaya Kuroda (Japanese); Christopher Sabat (English)
He has long white and red hair, with a long ponytail which acts like a tail. He has multiple piercings on his left ear and wears a golden choker. He is usually seen with a serious expression. When he was younger, he was usually seen training. He was strong enough to break a boulder in two with a single strike, mediate underwater and even studied diligently. He also was often seen with Samon by his side. According to Liang and Upa, Enki used to be in charge of a prison in China where he cruelly beat up inmates to become stronger. Upa was nearly killed by his abuse and Liang was terrified at the thought that he would be next but Enki was transferred to Nanba Prison. Formerly the supervising officer of Building 5, he was well-respected and admired by the many fellow guards and even inmates throughout Nanba Prison. He was also considered indispensable to Building 5 and Nanba Prison. However, according to Liang and Upa, Enki had continued to cruelly beat up inmates in Nanba Prison which causes inmates to fear Enki. Enki had built an underground prison beneath Building 5, and has a secret archive room which has data on certain dangerous criminals, later discovered by Jyugo, that Enki was aware that Jyugo was part of a human experiment. After betraying his co-workers and killing an inmate, later revealed to be Elf, he was apprehended and arrested by his co-workers. He now resides in the underground prison of Building 5. Some time ago, Enki faced someone with blades similar to Jyugo. The mysterious person managed to injure Enki's left arm and Enki called him a monster. Since then, Enki was searching for him with the intent to kill him, as he believes the man is too dangerous to let live. During the second season, he is released by Inori and Houzuki. The three join forces with Ruka and Hachiman, who have all allied themselves with Enki. The five proceed to carry out a plan to capture all of the inmates and supervisors, although it is not known exactly what Enki's ultimate goal is. While trying to capture the inmates, he sees Jyugo and plans to kill him, as he believes that he is the man with the blades who attacked him.
Houzuki Sanzou (三蔵 法月, Sanzō Hōzuki)
Voiced by: Fuyuka Ooura (Japanese); Matt Shipman (English)
A junior guard at Building 5 and the younger brother of Noriko.
Hitoshi Sugoroku (双六 仁志, Sugoroku Hitoshi)
Voiced by: Eishin Fudemura (Japanese); Howard Wang (English)
Hajime's cute blonde cross-dressing brother who befriends Jyugo. He has a kind and sweet personality and is very girly. He is more or less the opposite of Hajime; slow, clumsy and non-athletic. However, the one trait he shares with his brother is his toughness. Like Hajime, he can withstand abnormal amounts of impact, brushing them off like nothing. Hajime even goes so far as using him as a blunt weapon or projectile.
Mao Nimaijita ((ニ舞下 猫, Nimaijita Mao)
Voiced by: Yō Taichi (Japanese); Morgan Berry (English)
The Building 2 Deputy Supervisor. He first appeared to be filling in as the Building 8 Supervising Officer. He has a cat-like face and mannerisms.
Daisen Rokuriki (六力 大仙, Rokuriki Daisen)
Voiced by: Atsushi Kousaka (Japanese); Joel McDonald (English)
A Building 5 guard, primarily assigned to organizing the warehouse. He is the twin brother of Kokoriki and the younger brother of Youriki.
Daisen Kokoriki (九力 大仙, Kokoriki Daisen)
Voiced by: Shin Nagai (Japanese); Orion Pitts (English)
A Building 5 guard and former marathon runner. He is the twin brother of Rokuriki and the younger brother of Youriki.
Daisen Youriki (八力 大仙, Yōriki Daisen)
Voiced by: Yamato Kinjō (Japanese); Aaron Roberts (English)
A Building 5 guard and former pro wrestler. He is older brother of Rokuriki and Kokoriki.

=== Other staff members ===
KAGU-8 (神八, Kaguya)
Voiced by: Yō Taichi (Japanese); Rochelle Grimsmo (English)
The android nurse at Nanba Prison who was created by Okina and Kazari as their "daughter".
Shiro (シロ)
The Building 13 Chef. He was once a prisoner himself, but after serving his sentence, he returned to Nanba to learn cooking and be a chef. He is a massive hulking figure, with a stony, unchanging face. He usually expresses his emotions in actions, like giving Rock a cake, when complimented. However, Rock has also proven to be able to identify certain emotions on his blank face such as happiness, when they obtained a stone oven for the kitchen.
Okina Otogi (御十義 翁, Otogi Okina)
Voiced by: Hiroshi Yanaka (Japanese); Jeremy Schwartz (English)
The head doctor at Nanba Prison.
Kazari Otogi (御十義 飾, Otogi Kazari)
Voiced by: Shizuka Okohira (Japanese); Linda Leonard (English)
The head scientist at Nanba Prison.

=== Other inmates ===
Tsukumo (ツクモ)
Voiced by: Toshiyuki Toyonaga (Japanese); Sam Biggs (English)
Inmate number 1399. He believes that he is a shinobi (ninja), but his techniques usually fail to work. Ironically, he was born in a ninja village, but even as a child he was terrible. He was found by a movie director, who wanted a real shinobi to cast in her film. She tricked the child into believing that she was his long lost mother, come to take him back, and raised him to be an actor and shinobi. When he discovered the truth he tried to head back to his home village, but got lost and ended up getting arrested for trespassing. After escaping the prison, he was recaptured and sent to Nanba Prison.
Musashi (ムサシ)
Voiced by: Yoshimasa Hosoya (Japanese); Jason Liebrecht (English)
Inmate number 4634. He was born with a rare disease that keeps his body temperature much higher than normal and allows him to manifest flames. He would learn to live and adapt with the disease. However, when he went to college in Germany, his condition went out of control. Fellow student Elf took advantage of the situation by framing him for numerous arson crimes in order to make it acceptable for him as a convicted criminal to be used as a test subject. In an act of rebellion, he burned the lab, but his power was suppressed by the Man with the Scar, which led to him being sent to Nanba Prison where he finally found someone who believed his story in Kenshiro. He has since been determined to get revenge against that scientist.
Liang (リャン, Ryan)
Voiced by: Yuuki Fujiwara (Japanese); Blake Shepard (English)
Inmate number 0502. A master martial artist who can usually be found training. He willingly joined the mob as a young boy to save the life of his teacher, who he witnessed nearly being murdered by the mob for refusing their demands. He was supposed to be an assassin for the boss, but he believed that killing was a sin, and instead used a drug created by Qi to knock his targets out while making them appear to be dead. Eventually he was found out by the boss, who rounded up all the people Liang had spared and forced him to watch them be killed before being brutally tortured himself. When the organization was shut down by the police, he was arrested and sent to jail in China. After a short period there, he was transferred to Nanba Prison. He was severely depressed and disillusioned with martial arts by this time, as his years in the mob had damaged his ideals and left him thinking that he could never be a good person after what he had done. Eventually, he was able to rediscover his passion after Samon took him in and began training him. He considers Samon to be his mentor and wants to become stronger so that he can be useful to the guard, who he credits with giving him the will to continue living.
Upa (ウパ)
Voiced by: Yū Kobayashi (Japanese); Aaron Dismuke (English)
Inmate number 0558. Upa is a powerful qigong master and has a talisman attached to his head to restrict his qi usage. He was kidnapped by the crime syndicate Liang used to work for when he was a child because as the most prodigious member of a powerful clan, his internal organs were worth a great deal of money on the black market. He stayed and worked for the group willingly, as they had promised to return his organs if he proved useful to them. However, it is revealed in season 2 that the organs he received were not his own, but Qi's, who had had his organs transplanted to Upa after he began dying due to his body shutting down. After he was arrested, he was sent to a prison in China, where he became a victim of Enki's abuse. However, during this time, he also met Samon after the guard was able to put him back in contact with his family, who had been told by the mob boss that he had died. He highly respects Samon because even though the guard claimed that he was just doing his job, he was the first person to show him any sort of kindness or respect in years. His aim is to finish serving out his sentence and attempt to begin a new, better life alongside Liang and Qi.
Qi (チィー, Chī)
Voiced by: Genki Okawa (Japanese); Gabe Kunda (English)
Inmate number 0571. A prisoner famous for his skill at making drugs and poisons. He resides in cell block five with Liang and Upa. He is rather lazy, and can usually be seen relaxing or sleeping in the background, to the point that Liang and Upa often call him "lazy trash". He was forced into working for the same people who had taken Liang and Upa to save his own life. He initially was unconcerned about the mob's immoral actives, as he was focused on self preservation, but came to hate them after witnessing the boss abusing Liang and Upa. Unbeknownst to Upa, he even gave him some of his own internal organs to save the young boy's life. Eventually, he discovered that his products were being modified to maim and kill the people who used them and, following his arrest, swore that he would never manufacture drugs or poisons again, as he had come to believe that his talents could only hurt other people. During this time, he also lost his ability to trust others. When he was transferred to Nanba Prison, however, he eventually was able to take up his trade again after being encouraged by Samon. He came to respect Samon for his honesty and kindness, and hopes that he will be able to repay the guard before he is released.
Trois (トロワ, Trowa)
Voiced by: Yūto Adachi (Japanese); Elijah Muller (English)
Inmate number 0303. He shares a cell with Honey.
Honey (ハニー, Hanī)
Voiced by: Takao Mitsutomi (Japanese); Kyle Igneczi (English)
Inmate number 0382. He shares a cell with Trois.
Ruka Gojou (五浄 流河, Gojō Ruka)
Voiced by: Naozumi Takahashi (Japanese); Stephen Fu (English)
A former guard at Nanba Prison Building 5, and a current inmate there.
Hachiman (八萬, Hachiman)
Voiced by: Kouji Takeda (Japanese); Chris Guerrero (English)
Inmate 0508. A former crime boss of the Chinese mafia wearing a pig mask.

=== Other characters ===
Elf (エルフ, Erufu)
Voiced by: Daisuke Kishio (Japanese); Austin Tindle (English)
A mysterious character who framed Musashi for a series of arson crimes.
Man with the Scar (傷の男, Kizu no Otoko)
Voiced by: Masanori Ikeda (Japanese); Phil Parsons (English)
An unknown figure, who is responsible for Jyugo's irremovable shackles and Musashi's pyrokinesis. His only known feature is a distinctive scar on the back of his neck. His real name is revealed to be Mashiro Mutsuki (睦月 真白, Mutsuki Mashiro).
Noriko Sanzou (三蔵 法子, Sanzō Noriko)
Voiced by: Fuyuka Ooura (Japanese); Dawn M. Bennett (English)
The older sister of Houzuki and an old friend of Enki and Samon.

== Media ==
=== Manga ===
Shō Futamata began serializing the manga on NHN Japan's Comico webtoon app on 13 October 2013. The series is published in print by Futabasha. Crunchyroll Manga acquired the series for digital publication in English.

==== Volumes ====
No.	Original release date	Original ISBN	English release date	English ISBN
1	12 November 2015	978-4-575-84713-0	21 December 2015	—
1. "Prisoner × 4 + Guard × 1" (囚人×4+看守×1, Shūjin × 4 + Kanshu × 1); 2. "The Best Prison" (最強の刑務所？, Saikyō no Keimusho?); 3. "What No.25 Wants to Do" (25番のやりたいこと, 25-ban no Yaritai Koto); 4. "The Cafeteria Watchdog" (食堂の番犬, Shokudō no Banken); 5. "A Deputy Appears!! (副看守現る！！, Fuku Kanshu Genru!!); 6. "Enter Tsukumo" (九十九参上, Tsukumo Sanjō); 7. "Always Greet Your Boss" (上司には挨拶を, Jōshi ni wa Aisatsu o); 8. "How to Enjoy Lunch" (昼食の楽しみ方, Chūshoku no Tanoshimi-kata); 9. "We Can Work Too" (仕事だってできる, Shigoto Datte Dekiru); 10. "The Warden Appears!!" (看守長現る!!, Kanshu-chō Genru!!); 11. "Reason for Incarceration Revealed (Part 1)" (収容理由大暴露(前編), Shūyō Riyū dai Bakuro (Zenpen)); 12. "Reason for Incarceration Revealed (Part 2)" (収容理由大暴露(後編), Shūyō Riyū dai Bakuro (Kōhen))
2	12 May 2016	978-4-575-84794-9	3 August 2016	—
13. "BLDG 13, Cell 13 Is Busy as Usual" (13舎13房は今日も忙しい, 13-Sha 13 bō wa Kyō mo Isogashī); 14. "Sensing a Huge Storm Coming so Early in the New Year!" (新年早々大波乱の予感!?, Shin'nen Sōsō dai Haran no Yokan!?); 15. "Turbulence!! The New Year's Tournament, Part 1" (波乱万丈!!新年大会編1, Haranbanjō!! Shin'nen Taikai-hen 1); 16. "Turbulence!! The New Year's Tournament, Part 2" (波乱万丈!!新年大会編2, Haranbanjō!! Shin'nen Taikai-hen 2); 17. "Turbulence!! The New Year's Tournament, Part 3" (波乱万丈!!新年大会編3, Haranbanjō!! Shin'nen Taikai-hen 3); 18. "Turbulence!! The New Year's Tournament, Part 4" (波乱万丈!!新年大会編4, Haranbanjō!! Shin'nen Taikai-hen 4); 19. "Turbulence!! The New Year's Tournament, Part 5" (波乱万丈!!新年大会編5, Haranbanjō!! Shin'nen Taikai-hen 5); 20. "Turbulence!! The New Year's Tournament, Part 6" (波乱万丈!!新年大会編6, Haranbanjō!! Shin'nen Taikai-hen 6)
3	12 September 2016	978-4-575-84846-5	24 September 2016	—
21. "Turbulence!! The New Year's Tournament, Part 7" (波乱万丈!!新年大会編7, Haranbanjō!! Shin'nen Taikai-hen 7); 22. "Turbulence!! The New Year's Tournament, Part 8" (波乱万丈!!新年大会編8【終盤戦】, Haranbanjō!! Shin'nen Taikai-hen 8 [Shūban-sen]); 23. "Turbulence!! The New Year's Tournament, Part 9" (波乱万丈!!新年大会編9【終盤戦】, Haranbanjō!! Shin'nen Taikai-hen 9 [Shūban-sen]); 24. "Turbulence!! The New Year's Tournament, Final" (波乱万丈!!新年大会編終, Haranbanjō!! Shin'nen Taikai-hen Tsui); 25. "If You Want to Talk to Him, Go to the Smoking Room" (奴と話すなら喫煙室へ, Yatsu to Hanasunara Kitsuen-shitsu e)
4	10 February 2017	978-4-575-84924-0	—	—
26. Inu Shirō no Nagai Tsuitachi (犬士郎の長い一日); 27. Kiji-sama no Kunan'na Tsuitachi (キジ様の苦難な一日); 28. Saru-mon Ikari no Tsuitachi (猿門怒りの一日); 29. Mokuteki to Jijitsu (目的と事実); 30. Shakunetsu no Inochi (灼熱の命); 31. Sukui no Dantōdai (救いの断頭台); 32. Shi no Iki Jigoku (死の生き地獄); 33. Shinu Tame ni Ikiru (死ぬために生きる); 34. Homura no Te (焔の手); 35. Muyoku to Mikansei (無欲と未完成)
5	12 June 2017	978-4-575-84970-7	—	—
36. Kansei Soshite Furidashi e (完成そしてフリダシへ); 37. Mata Yoroshiku (またよろしく); 38. Dainibu Kaishi!! Shin Kyara Tōjō ka!? (第二部開始!!新キャラ登場か!?); 39. 13 Bō Kōrei Onigokko [Hitoshi-hen] (13房恒例鬼ごっこ【仁志編】); 40. 13 Bō Kōrei Onigokko [Hitoshi-hen] 2 (13房恒例鬼ごっこ【仁志編】2); 41. 13 Bō Kōrei Onigokko [Hitoshi-hen] 3 (13房恒例鬼ごっこ【仁志編】3); 42. Nanba Nichijō × 3 (南波日常×3); 43. Nanbana Kandzume (南波な缶詰)
6	12 September 2017	978-4-575-85026-0	—	—
44. Dai Nanba Jukunen Fūfu (第南波熟年夫婦); 45. Go Hōbi Moraimashita 1 (ご褒美もらいました 1); 46. Go Hōbi Moraimashita 2 (ご褒美もらいました 2); 47. Go Hōbi Moraimashita 3 (ご褒美もらいました 3); 48. Go Hōbi Moraimashita 4 (ご褒美もらいました 4); 49. Go Hōbi Moraimashita 5 (ご褒美もらいました 5); 50. Nanba no Ryūkō (南波の流行); 51. Shinobu no Uso (忍の嘘); 52. Shinobu no Shin (忍の真)
7	12 January 2018	978-4-575-85090-1	—	—
8	12 July 2018	978-4-575-85195-3	—	—

==== Chapter not yet in tankōbon format ====
The following chapters have not yet been collected into a tankōbon volume:

53. Shinobu no Namida (忍の涙)
54. Shinobu no Sai (忍の才)
55. Nakanaori (仲直り)
56. Go Hōbi Moraimashita 6 (ご褒美もらいました 6)
57. Go Hōbi Moraimashita 7 (ご褒美もらいました 7)
58. Go Hōbi Moraimashita 8 (ご褒美もらいました 8)
59. Go Hōbi Moraimashita 9 (ご褒美もらいました 9)
60. Wasuremono (わすれもの)
61. Shiawase no Katachi (しあわせのかたち)
62. Me no Maenanoni (めのまえなのに)
63. Kakatte Koi! (かかってこい！)
64. Honto no 5-sha (ほんとの5舎)
65. Shinjiteru (信じてる)
66. Zaiaku-kan (罪悪感)
67. Kowareru (壊れる)
68. Nani mo Dekinakute (なにもできなくて)
69. Ano Toki no Koto wa Wasure Tenia (あの時のことは忘れてない)
70. Kangaeru Yori (考えるより)
71. Torihiki Shiyou Ze (取引しようぜ)
72. Shibaraku o Azukari Shimasu (しばらくお預かりします)
73. Chō Yabai Kamo? (超ヤバイかも？)
74. Yappari Yabakatta!!! (やっぱりヤバかった!!!)
75. Go-sha no Niwa (五舎の庭)
76. Uragiri (裏切り)
77. Kotchi wa Kotchi de (こっちはこっちで)
78. Genkai Yoroshiku (限界よろしく)
79. Oboeteru, Oboetenai (覚えてる、覚えてない)
80. Tōgeki Yūsen Jun'i (闘劇優先順位)
81. Kikkake, Chansu, Ribenji (きっかけ、チャンス、リベンジ)
82. Enbu (演舞)
83. Koitsu a Yabē... (こいつぁヤベェ・・・)
84. Oi, Chottomate Kiitenai (おい、ちょっと待て聞いてない)
85. Michi o Hazushita Orokamono (道を外した愚か者)
86. Shōjikina Yakutatazu (正直な役立たず)
87. Niko (にこ)
88. Futari-me no Eiyū? (二人目の英雄？)
89. Majide Kireru 5-byō Mae (マジでキレる5秒前)
90. Kireruto Kowai 8 Bō (キレると怖い8房)
91. Iwakan no Saki Ni (違和感の先に)
92. Mizu mo Shitataru Sugi Terudaro! (水も滴りすぎてるだろ！)
93. Tada no Ikemen Jaarimasen (ただのイケメンじゃありません)
94. Temē no Tsura ga Kinīranē (てめぇのツラが気に入らねぇ)
95. Oto o Haku (音を吐く)
96. Kakko Warui to Iwanaide ~tsu! (カッコ悪いと言わないでっ！)
97. Mabushi Sugite Komatchau (眩しすぎて困っちゃう)
98. Kore de Kugidzuke Machigainai (これで釘付け間違いない)
99. Nasakenai to Iwanaide ~tsu! (情けないと言わないでっ！)
100. Sassato Tsurete Koi! (さっさと連れてこい！)
101. Kokkara Honban Korehagachi! (こっから本番これはガチ！)
102. Sora Iro (空色)
103. Tsutaetaikoto (伝えたいこと)
104. Kōhan-sen Kaimaku! (後半戦開幕！)
105. Jishin Kaminari Kaji Okama (地震雷火事オカマ)
106. Hakken!! (発見！!)
107. Mōikkai! (もう一回！)
108. Dakara Omae wa Aho nanda (だからお前はアホなんだ)
109. Mu Mondai (無問題)
110. (MONKEY MAGIC)
111. Hangyaku (反逆)
112. Anata no Tame ni Dekiru Koto (貴方の為にできること)
113. Daisen (大仙)
114. Gokū Enki (悟空猿鬼)
115. Shinjitsu ni Chikadzuki Sugita Otoko (真実に近づきすぎた男)
116. Sunao Janai (素直じゃない)
117. Shihōhappō Gochagocha (四方八方ごっちゃごちゃ)
118. Ichinan Sattenai no ni Mata Ichinan (一難去ってないのにまた一難)
119. Nikaime Nante Gomenda Ze (二回目なんてごめんだぜ)
120. Omoi, Omoi (想い、思い)
121. Outotsu Jihen (凸凹事変)
122. Mitsumeru Saki wa (見つめる先は)
123. Gokū Kyōdai (悟空兄弟)
124. Kansatsu-sha (観察者)

=== Anime ===
NHN Play Art announced in February 2015 that the series would receive an anime adaptation. The series is directed by Shinji Takamatsu and written by Mitsutaka Hirota, with animation by Satelight. The series premiered on 5 October 2016 on MBS. Crunchyroll licensed the series and simulcasted the anime on their service, and Funimation simulcasted the dub for the series on their service. On 22 November 2016, Crunchyroll announced that it will continue to stream into the second season. An original video animation for the series aired at the "Nanfes" event in April 2017, with the episode later being bundled with the "Nanfes" DVD on 26 July 2017. Crunchyroll later streamed the original video animation on 30 September 2017.

==== Season 1 ====
No. overall	No. in season	Title (Note: All English titles are taken from Crunchyroll.)	Original air date (Note: Episodes first air on MBS at 3:00 am but listed as 27:00. Dates reflect actual air date.)
1	1	"Idiots with Numbers!" "Nanbā no Tsuita Baka-tachi!" (ナンバーのついたバカたち！)	5 October 2016
Four inmates (Jyugo, Uno, Rock and Nico) attempt to escape from the world's most secure prison on a remote island called Nanba Prison. Although they evade various booby traps, they are eventually recaptured by Building 13 supervising officer Hajime Sugoroku waiting outside the front entrance and returned to their cell in Building 13. Jyugo, Uno, Rock and Nico come to the conclusion that life at Nanba Prison is not that bad. After learning of a blonde lady visiting the prison, Jyugo, Uno, Rock and Nico break out of their cell and rush into the visiting room. It turns out that this blonde lady is actually Hajime's younger cross-dressing brother Hitoshi Sugoroku. Prison warden Momoko Hyakushiki arrives back at Nanba Prison and warns Hajime to treat Jyugo with caution, as it is revealed that Jyugo's father is known as the "eternal fugitive". Meanwhile, Jyugo escapes from his cell again, telling Hitoshi that he vows to find the Man with the Scar, a scientist who is responsible for placing irremovable black shackles on Jyugo's neck, wrists and ankles.
2	2	"The Inmates Are Stupid! The Guards Are Kind of Stupid, Too!" "Shūjin mo Baka! Kanshu mo Chotto Baka!!" (囚人もバカ！ 看守もちょっとバカ！！)	12 October 2016
At the warden's office, Momoko tells Hajime that Jyugo, Uno, Rock and Nico are described as diabolical escape artists, but Hajime hides the fact that the four inmates have caused problems. When Hajime leaves the warden's office, it is shown that Momoko secretly has a crush on Hajime. Soon after, Hajime finds Jyugo sleeping in the night duty room, as Jyugo claims that Rock snores, Uno grinds his teeth and Nico laughs in his sleep. Hajime later assigns the prisoners of Building 13 to the woodworking department for handcrafted furniture. However, Hajime gets upset when Nico and Uno carve wooden dolls while Jyugo and Rock assemble a chest of drawers with ejecting drawers. Suspense builds as Hajime makes his way to the warden's office in order to give Momoko a dossier of Jyugo, Uno, Rock and Nico. Momoko notices that there is no mention of the four inmates attempting to escape Nanba Prison. Hajime details Nico's drug abuse, Rock's obsession with fighting and food, Uno's compulsive gambling and dating and Jyugo's hobby of escaping prison. It is concluded that Jyugo, Uno, Rock and Nico do not desire to escape from Nanba Prison since they are comfortable there.
3	3	"Another Idiot Has Come!!" "Mata Baka ga Fueta!!" (またバカが増えた！！)	19 October 2016
After Hajime learns that Jyugo, Uno, Rock and Nico are constantly bullying prison guard Seitarou Tanabata, Hajime suggests for Seitarou to exploit the weaknesses of the four inmates. At the warden's office, Momoko informs Hajime that a new inmate will be transferred to Cell 13 with the four inmates. Soon after, the four inmates are introduced to Tsukumo, who claims to be a ninja. Tsukumo challenges Jyugo to a prison escape contest, while Uno, Rock and Nico serve as judges. However, they are caught by Hajime near the courtyard, and Tsukumo ends up trapping himself within his scattered leaves and makibishi. Tsukumo will be transferred to Cell 11 as a result. Seitarou and Building 13 deputy supervisor Yamato Godai assign Jyugo, Uno, Rock and Nico to clean and decorate their cell in preparation for New Year's Day. Meanwhile, Hajime and Building 5 supervising officer Samon Gokuu are assigned to clean the warden's office, where Momoko is captivated by Hajime's thorough work. Momoko later has a meeting with all supervising officers concerning the building representatives for an upcoming tournament.
4	4	"Happy New Year! This New Year's Tournament Is Where We Get Serious!!" "Akemashite! Koko kara honki no shin'nen taikai! !" (あけまして！ ここから本気の新年大会！！)	26 October 2016
In an arena, Momoko announces the New Year Joint Cooperation Tournament, where prisoners and officers from each building are formed into competing teams across five events. Chief broadcaster Mitsuru Hitokoe gives play-by-play commentary. During the first event called Kakizome, Jyugo displays terrible penmanship in calligraphy, yet Hajime and Yamato both present winning scripts. During the second event called Mochi Pounding Daruma Drop, Rock fights Building 5 inmate Liang while Yamato battles Building 5 deputy supervisor Inori Hakkai. It is revealed that Liang trained tirelessly to fight against Rock, who was Liang's former cellmate. Rock wishes to have a stone oven as his prize. Using their fighting prowess, both Rock and Yamato easily defeat Liang and Inori, thereby winning the match. During the third event called Hyakunin Isshu, Seitarou and Uno are up against Building 3 supervising officer Kiji Mitsuba and Building 5 inmates Trois and Honey in a game of competitive karuta. Seitarou easily wins against Kiji, but Uno seemingly heads towards defeat against Trois and Honey.
5	5	"A Fraud and a Hero" "Ika-sama to Hīrō" (イカサマとヒーロー)	2 November 2016
As the third event continues, Uno suddenly wins the game as he outplays Trois and Honey due to their telltale body language before they pick each card. Uno wishes for a game room as his prize. During the fourth event called Top Spinning, up to three participants from each team have to spin a giant top and knock the other team's top out of the ring. Hajime competes against Samon, while Kiji competes against Building 4 supervising officer Kenshiro Yozakura. A grudge match starts between Samon and Building 5 inmates Upa and Qi against Hajime and Nico. When Upa and Qi attack Hajime, Nico intervenes while Qi decides to sit out. Hajime is able to deflect attacks when Samon swings his staff. Upa is amazed when Nico begins copying attacks from Liang's martial arts and Upa's qigong. Nico wishes to have the latest video game console as his prize. Hajime and Nico eventually emerge victorious against Samon and Upa. Meanwhile, Kiji is defeated by Kenshiro in their match.
6	6	"The Booster Episode" "THE・Tekoire" (THE・テコ入れ)	9 November 2016
During an intermission, Momoko tells Mitsuru that Building 13 and Building 4 will advance to the last event. In the infirmary, Samon and Inori discuss that Qi is a pharmaceutical chemist who can make both drugs and poisons. During the fifth and final event called Sake Barrel Opening, Hajime and Jyugo are forced to face Kenshiro and Building 4 inmate Musashi. The fight commences as it is revealed that Musashi is Jyugo's former cellmate. A box full of non-lethal weapons is open to the participants. Hajime fares well while fighting barehanded against Kenshiro, but Kenshiro fights back with an invisible attack technique by the crack of his whip. However, Hajime eventually dodges the attacks and defeats Kenshiro. Meanwhile, Jyugo does not fare well against Musashi. Jyugo retaliates in a fit of rage when Musashi mentions about the Man with the Scar. Musashi fights back with a spontaneous human combustion technique by conjuring and controlling flames.
7	7	"It's a Surprisingly Sad Story" "Igaito Setsunai Hanashi de Gozaru" (意外と切ない話でござる)	16 November 2016
Mitsuru interrupts the fifth event and shifts the focus to Tsukumo's backstory. Yamato brings Tsukumo to the visiting room, where Tsukumo's former manager Hanzō Hattori admits that he lied to the press about Tsukumo being reported missing. Tsukumo then reveals that he discovered that the Director lied about being his biological mother. In the past, the Director and her assistant Sukegawa found a young Tsukumo, who was abandoned by his parents in a forest village. Revealed as Hattori's mother who was a former actress, the Director pretended to be Tsukumo's mother and trained Tsukumo to become a ninja. However, the Director was just grooming Tsukumo to become a child actor. In the present, Hattori tells Tsukumo that he has the potential to play various character roles for fame and wealth. After Jyugo eavesdrops outside the visiting room, Tsukumo admits that he enjoys being an actor, but he ran away from the talent agency after realizing that he was only seen as his character roles. Although Tsukumo plans to find his village after his prison release, Jyugo encourages Tsukumo to stay true to himself. Mitsuru says that the fifth event will conclude in the next episode.
8	8	"A Monster and a Gorilla" "Bakemono to Gorira" (バケモノとゴリラ)	23 November 2016
As the fifth event continues, Jyugo's shackles on his wrists have transformed into two long blades. Jyugo unleashes a powerful burst of energy at Musashi, causing massive damage to the arena and prompting a mandatory evacuation for the panicking spectators. As Musashi counters with fireballs, Momoko orders Jyugo and Musashi to be apprehended. It is revealed that Jyugo blinded Musashi in the past. Although Kenshiro, Kiji and Samon manage to subdue and capture Musashi while dodging his fireballs, Hajime is unable to thwart Jyugo. Uno, Rock and Nico jump in and try to subdue Jyugo, but he ends up breaking free from their grasp. Just as Jyugo prepares to kill Uno, Hajime intervenes and beats Jyugo to a bloody pulp before Momoko orders Hajime to stop. A few days later, Jyugo is revealed to be unconscious and in critical condition at the medical ward. Kenshiro, Kiji and Samon berate Hajime for being so violent and spoiling the post-festival feast. In his cell, Uno also criticizes Hajime for going overboard. Hajime becomes despondent upon learning from Mitsuru that Momoko has suspended Hajime for three days as punishment.
9	9	"You're Empty!!" "Omae Wa Karappo!!" (お前はからっぽ！！)	30 November 2016 (Note: Episode 9 aired 20 minutes later than normal time.)
Three days later, Hajime learns from Kenshiro that Musashi, who is currently being held inside an underground cell in Building 4, will not answer any questions until he is permitted to talk to Jyugo, who is currently being held inside another underground cell in the medical ward. Hajime and Kenshiro set up an intercom via walkie-talkies. Although Jyugo is searching for the Man with the Scar in order to remove his shackles, Musashi seeks to kill the Man with the Scar, who previously disposed of Musashi after acquiring information from the inhumane experiments on his physical idiosyncrasy, his innate power to create fire. Jyugo responds despondently when Musashi reveals that his flames are now disabled. As the intercom disconnects, Hajime accuses Jyugo of having no objective and behaving like a spoiled brat. Hajime gives Jyugo five minutes to decide what he wants as the winner of the tournament. After Jyugo thinks back to when Uno, Rock and Nico discussed what they would do after they were released from prison, Jyugo begs for a second chance to be back in Building 13, having the renewed desire to pursue the Man with the Scar.
10	10	"A Melancholy Day for the Dog, Monkey, and Pheasant" "Inu Saru Kiji no Yūutsuna Tsuitachi" (犬・猿・雉の憂鬱な一日)	7 December 2016
While Hajime was suspended for three days, Momoko assigns Kenshiro, Kiji and Samon to take turns covering for Hajime. On the first day, Kenshiro brings Nico to head doctor Okina Otogi for a post-tournament checkup, while Uno and Rock tag along. Uno, Rock and Nico encounter Trois and Honey, who are being treated for their injuries from competitive karuta. They all are completely enamored with nurse android KAGU-8 (Kaguya). On the second day, Kiji sympathetically gives Uno, Rock and Nico a rolled futon with a picture of Jyugo's face before teaching them about the prison layout. This escalates into an argument between Uno and Kiji over who is more attractive. On the third day, Samon prepares to wake up Uno, Rock and Nico, but they fail to avoid a session of physical training when Yamato and Tsukumo show up. In the present, Hajime says that Jyugo is being used as a guinea pig by the Man with the Scar in order to perfect the power of the shackles. Jyugo returns to Cell 13 in an apologetic mood for his reckless behavior.
11	11	"We Got Our Rewards" "Go Hōbi Morai Mashita" (ご褒美もらいました)	14 December 2016
After receiving the stone oven in the Building 13 cafeteria as his prize, Rock invites Liang over to the Building 13 cafeteria and treats him to delicious pizza. Wanting Liang to enjoy and appreciate eating, Rock gives Liang a nostalgic peach bun. Rock recalls that Jyugo once treated him to some tasty sliders at a diner. Jyugo, Uno and Rock visit Nico at the infirmary, where they meet head scientist Kazari Otogi, Okina's wife. After Kazari brings Nico to a newly built amusement arcade, Nico invites Upa over to the amusement arcade and eventually convinces him to play the claw crane. Kazari then gives Nico the latest video game console as his prize. Nico recalls that Jyugo helped him find his purpose in life by sparking his interest in manga. Jyugo and Musashi reconcile, while Uno invites Musashi to hang out together. Kenshiro later allows Musashi to visit Building 13 if he divulges information about his past.
12	12	"The Room, the Billiards, the Darts and Me" "Heya to Biriyādo to Dātsu to Watashi" (部屋とビリヤードとダーツと私)	21 December 2016
In the past, Musashi was born with a rare disease that made his body temperature higher than normal. His innate power to create fire described as spontaneous human combustion eventually led to him being incarcerated in Germany after being framed as an arsonist. The Man with the Scar augmented Musashi's ability rather than cured it, while the one responsible for framing Musashi was Elf, the assistant of the Man with the Scar. After gathering enough data, the Man with the Scar disposed of Musashi. In the present, Kenshiro explains that he was a former police officer, whose reports about the inhumane experiments were characterized as baseless rumors, but he still intends on exposing the truth. Meanwhile, Uno invites Jyugo, Rock, Nico, Trois, Honey, Liang, Upa, Qi and Musashi to furnish the game room as his prize. Hajime informs that all the inmates will only have one hour per day to hang out in the game room, much to their dismay. After telling Jyugo that his long list of flaws is what makes him a relatable character, Uno recalls when Jyugo showed him what a prison escape first felt like. Under the bright night sky, Elf approaches Jyugo from behind.
13	13	"Real Idiot" "Maji Baka" (マジバカ)	28 December 2016
Elf reveals that Jyugo was set free by the Man with the Scar, now considered a traitor. After exploiting Jyugo for living freely and selfishly, Elf accuses Jyugo of running away with the shackles. As he regrets not killing Jyugo any sooner, Elf subdues Jyugo to the ground and prepares to dissect Jyugo's head with his magical knife. Jyugo manages to free himself by instinctively transforming his left wrist shackle into a long blade. Elf leaves and vows to return after revealing that he was checking up on Jyugo's current status and planning to snatch a new body. This causes Jyugo to worry that his inmates are now in danger. The following night, Jyugo, Uno, Rock and Nico attempt another prison escape, but they are caught again by Hajime waiting outside the front entrance. Jyugo locks his cellmates inside, hoping that they will be safe if he leaves by himself. A titanic fight erupts between Jyugo and Hajime, but Seitarou eventually unlocks the front entrance in order to allow Uno, Rock and Nico to intervene. Jyugo has a change of heart, deciding to stay and protect his cellmates.

==== Season 2 ====
No. overall	No. in season	Title	Original release date
14	1	"Nanbaka Is a Comedy Anime" "Nanbaka wa Gyagu Animedearu" (ナンバカはギャグアニメである)	4 January 2017
Hajime Sugoroku finds Jyugo sleeping in the library and brings him back to Cell 13 with Uno, Rock and Nico. At the warden's office, Momoko Hyakushiki performs a piledriver on Mitsuru Hitokoe for mocking her crush on Hajime, who hastily leaves after seeing blood splattered on Momoko's face. Seitarou Tanabata buys himself a robotic vacuum cleaner, but Hajime ends up smashing it. In Building 5, Upa receives a cactus and allows Qi to help water it, much to the surprise of Liang. In the game room, Tsukumo signs an autograph for Trois and Honey. In the guard room, Kenshiro Yozakura becomes infatuated with a plushie of Momoko. Hajime smokes a cigarette, Samon Gokuu eats a popsicle and Yamato Godai brings his pet horse, all of which irritates Kiji Mitsuba. Hajime's pet cat Kuu wanders from the guard room to Cell 13. Musashi learns that Kenshiro has a crush on Momoko. Samon and Liang use Inori Hakkai as a punching bag. Trois and Honey try to ask KAGU-8 about her garments. A contagious random hair color syndrome spreads throughout the prison, infecting all inmates, guards and staff members except the bald-headed Hajime.
15	2	"Super Hitoshi-kun" "Sūpā Hitoshi-kun" (スーパー仁志くん)	11 January 2017
Momoko hires a squadron of new guards. Jyugo attempts to escape from prison yet again, only to be recaptured by Hajime. Recently informed by Mitsuru, Hajime learns that Hitoshi Sugoroku is a new guard who is assigned at Building 13. Jyugo, Uno, Rock and Nico have trouble believing that Hitsoshi is truly Hajime's younger brother. Uno and Rock teasingly play a game of tag with Hajime. After Uno and Rock trigger a fire sprinkler that sprays liquid nitrogen, Hajime proceeds to chase after them while using Hitoshi as a projectile and as a blunt weapon. Afterwards, Hajime learns that Mitsuru allowed Hitoshi to be assigned at Building 13 for one day as a favor before transferring to Building 4. While Hitoshi delivers documents to Building 3, he is mistaken by Trois and Honey as a young lady. Hitoshi later encourages Kenshiro to attend a party held at Building 4 with the other guards. In an underground cell, there is potentially a true horror that emerges.
16	3	"The Traitorous Building 5" "Uragiri no 5-sha" (裏切りの5舎)	18 January 2017
At Building 5, Liang tells Rock that Upa's qi is supposedly suppressed with a talisman attached to his face. Although Upa is scheduled to have a match with Samon, Rock eggs on Samon for a match of his own. Samon easily defeats Rock with the use of one finger, which impresses Liang, Upa, Qi, Tsukumo and Yamato. Inori brings junior guard Houzuki Sanzou to watch over the Building 5 inmates. At the warden's office, the supervising officers are left in charge of Nanba Prison while Momoko attends an emergency meeting with the commissioner at the police department's headquarters concerning information about Jyugo and Musashi. In the break room, Building 2 Deputy Supervisor Mao Nimaijita taunts Samon for being promoted from a deputy supervisor to a supervising officer because of his older brother Enki Gokuu, the former Building 5 Supervising Officer who betrayed the other guards and murdered an inmate. Kiji lashes out at Mao for offending Samon. Afterwards, Samon is visited by his friend and Houzuki's older sister Noriko Sanzou, who wonders when she will visit Enki, though Samon hides Enki's current status. Houzuki offers Rock and Yamato a cup of tea before they return to Building 13.
17	4	"Something Is Breaking" "Kowarete Iku Nanika" (壊れていく何か)	25 January 2017
Hajime and Seitarou are suddenly attacked by Yamato in the guard room, while Jyugo is suddenly attacked by Rock in the prison corridor. Both Rock and Yamato appear to be stone-faced. Hajime notices a command talisman attached to Yamato's nape after defeating him in the guard room, while Tsukumo soon arrives at the prison corridor and eventually removes a similar command talisman attached to Rock's nape. Jyugo and Tsukumo recover from their injuries in the infirmary, while Uno and Nico point out that Rock and Yamato have entered into a comatose state. As it is deduced that the command talismans came from Building 5, Hajime is blackmailed into allowing Jyugo, Uno and Nico to conduct an investigation at Building 5. Once there, Hajime ends up getting trapped inside a cage, while Jyugo, Uno and Nico end up falling through a trapdoor. It is soon revealed that Inori seems to be behind this scheme.
18	5	"You Are Weak" "Omae Wa Yowai" (お前は弱い)	1 February 2017
After falling through the trapdoor, Jyugo, Uno and Nico end up landing on top of Liang and Upa in an underground cell, which is being guarded by surveillance dolls carrying scythes. Inori also imprisons Hajime and Samon in another underground cell. Liang and Upa inform Jyugo, Uno and Nico about Enki's betrayal and prison escape. Nico loses his medicine bag, but it is secretly found by Qi, who is seen with Houzuki. A few hours earlier, Samon learned from Building 5 guard Daisen Rokuriki that Enki has escaped from prison and was accompanied by former Building 5 guard Ruka Gojou and former crime boss Hachiman. After Enki stopped Samon from confronting Ruka at the indoor water garden, Inori arrived and revealed that he released Enki after being jealous that Samon was promoted as a supervising officer ahead of him. In the present, Jyugo, Uno, Nico, Liang and Upa break out of their underground cell, as they set off to find and free Hajime and Samon in order to avoid recapture and punishment. On the way, they find and free Trois and Honey from another underground cell, learning that Kiji was also captured elsewhere.
19	6	"One's Own Freedom" "Sorezore no Jjiyū" (それぞれの自由)	8 February 2017
Jyugo, Uno, Nico, Liang, Upa, Trois and Honey find themselves in the first ground level of Gogyousan Underground, trying to avoid the surveillance dolls resembling jiangshi. They hide inside the management office, which is filled with forbidden archives. Jyugo finds confidential human experimentation records of himself, while Trois secretly takes an unknown object from a drawer. As they all head towards the second ground level of Gogyousan Underground, they are ambushed by Rokuriki with an attack talisman attached to his face. Rokuriki swings his deer hook swords at Liang, but Upa jumps in to help fight back. Liang and Upa decide to stay behind and force the others to go ahead, sealing the entryway towards the second ground level of Gogyousan Underground behind them. Before he was imprisoned by Enki, Liang learned how Jyugo has influenced Rock as well as Uno and Nico. However, Liang was powerless to rescue Samon from being captured by Enki. Liang finally felt free when Jyugo released Liang from the underground cell. In the present, Liang and Upa encounter Rokuriki and Hachiman, in which Liang defeats Rokuriki. Honey compliments Jyugo for unlocking anything with ease, while Nico soon goes missing.
20	7	"A Fool" "Orokamono" (愚か者)	15 February 2017
As Liang and Upa prepare to fight Hachiman, Nico surprisingly appears but stays hidden in the rubble. Hachiman attacks Liang and Upa with fast-acting multi-target poisonous gas, which was created by Qi. In the past, Hachiman paid Qi to make medicine in order to settle his debt, something Liang and Upa were aware about. On the other hand, Hachiman took Liang in return for sparing the life of his sensei. Furthermore, Hachiman forced Qi to make poison in order to stop Liang from being tortured. In the present, Liang and Upa overcome the poisonous gas, while Nico intervenes and saves them from being hit by Hachiman's massive mallet. Hachiman throws poisonous needles at Nico's back, but Nico manage to neutralize the poisonous needles. Meanwhile, Uno expresses his worry to Jyugo, Trois and Honey about losing sight of Nico. Hachiman is much too powerful against Nico, Liang and Upa, especially when Rokuriki reappears and uses qigong. As Hachiman grabs Nico by the neck, Nico feels extreme pain and loses consciousness from the lack of medicine. Nico reawakens with a maniacal look on his face.
21	8	"Awakening Poison" "Kakusei Suru Doku" (覚醒する毒)	22 February 2017
Uno informs Jyugo, Trois and Honey that Nico's medicine treats his violent split personality. Nico and Hachiman have a vicious fight, while Liang and Upa manage to restrict Rokuriki and destroy his attack talisman. A flashback reveals that Nico was a test subject for several drugs. Qi suddenly arrives and injects Nico with his medicine, causing Nico to collapse. However, Qi injects Hachiman with a paralyzing drug. In the past, Qi was surprised when Upa was kidnapped for having his organs harvested as a qigong master. In the present, Hachiman still manages to move and punches Qi into a wall, but Liang and Upa kick Hachiman into another wall and knock him unconscious. While trying to reconcile with Liang and Upa, Qi recalls when he bought back Upa's organs. Nico remembers feeling at home with his cellmates. Hachiman stirs up trouble when he views Liang, Upa and Qi as weak people. Liang and Upa fend off Hachiman's attacks, and Qi releases a poisonous gas from his pipe at Hachiman. Recalling when Samon brought him to the indoor water garden as a reward for divulging information about chemically untraceable poisons, Qi controls Hachiman to choke himself until he passes out.
22	9	"Washed Away..." "Naga Sarete" (流されて)	1 March 2017
Upa tells Liang that Enki may not have placed the attack talisman on Rokuriki. In the infirmary, Tsukumo deduces that Houzuki may have been involved with what previously happened to Rock and Yamato. Okina has Mao stay at the bedside of a resting Noriko. Meanwhile, Jyugo, Uno, Trois and Honey trigger a water trap, as they are washed up in the second ground level of Gogyousan Underground. They find a hidden room that stores unused surveillance dolls. As they walk deeper inside the second ground level of Gogyousan Underground, they are halted by Ruka and chased by Building 5 guards Daisen Kokoriki and Daisen Youriki, both of whom have attack talismans attached to their faces. It is revealed that Kiji is being imprisoned in the second ground level of Gogyousan Underground. Kiji attempts to coerce Ruka into releasing him in exchange for hyaluronic acid. Trois fires at Kokoriki and Youriki with a makeshift bazooka, which was built using a multi-tool that he found earlier. Ruka soon returns and captures Jyugo.
23	10	"Sound and Words" "Oto to Kotoba" (音と言葉)	8 March 2017
Trois bashes Ruka on the head from behind with a fuel tank before Jyugo, Uno, Trois and Honey make their escape. Although Honey insists that Jyugo is a liability and should be left behind, Uno later tells Jyugo that he has an unreadable face due to his burdened past. Ruka and Youriki suddenly burst through a wall, in which they capture both Jyugo and Uno. After much deliberation, Trois and Honey eventually decide to intervene. Trois uses a flamethrower in order to thwart Ruka and Youriki, while Honey uses purple threads in order to rescue Jyugo and Uno. Honey deduces that Ruka is hiding in a swimming pool beneath the floor panels, being able to come and go as he pleases. Trois and Honey destroy the floor panels where Ruka was hiding underneath. Just as Kokoriki and Youriki reappear, Trois and Honey manage to trap and detonate Ruka, Kokoriki and Youriki inside a box of floor panels. However, Ruka survives and prepares his next attack.
24	11	"Move Forward!" "Mae ni Susume!" (前に進め！)	15 March 2017
Ruka attacks with a cyclonic blast from his fans, but Honey manages to create a rocky barrier from his threads. Jyugo and Uno go on ahead, while Trois and Honey stay behind and deal with Ruka. Just as Trois and Honey are unable to fend off Ruka, Jyugo and Uno suddenly return. Jyugo's shackles on his wrists modify into two long blades. After absorbing Ruka's cyclonic blast, Jyugo redirects it back on Ruka. Kokoriki and Youriki reappear without attack talismans and try to capture Jyugo, Uno, Trois and Honey. However, Honey immobilizes Kokoriki and Youriki. As Jyugo and Uno proceed, Uno is chained by Ruka while Jyugo is forced to head towards the third ground level of Gogyousan Underground. Trois and Honey find and save Uno, while Kokoriki and Youriki still decide to capture Uno, Trois and Honey even though Ruka is currently posing as a guard. After creating a rocky barrier, Trois tells Uno and Honey that Kiji may be on the second ground level of Gogyousan Underground. Soon confronted by a horde of surveillance dolls, Jyugo transforms and charges forward, cutting his way through the surveillance dolls with his long blades.
25	12	"Sarabaka" "Sarabaka" (サラバカ)	22 March 2017
After Uno, Trois and Honey evade Kokoriki and Youriki, Trois faces against Ruka underwater. Enki learns that the inmates have escaped from their cells. While Trois subdues Ruka with a powerful gaze, Honey manages to steal Ruka's keys. As Uno and Honey continue to evade Kokoriki and Youriki, Uno and Honey find and free Kiji from his cell. Kokoriki and Youriki are set straight by Kiji, who then uses his chakrams and easily overpowers Ruka. Jyugo arrives in the fifth ground level of Gogyousan Underground, where he eventually finds Hajime and Samon in their cells. Uno, Trois, Honey, Kiji, Rika, Kokoriki and Youriki meet up with Nico, Liang, Upa and Qi. After Kiji arrests all the inmates, he confronts a horde of surveillance dolls. With a renewed purpose in life, Jyugo frees Hajime from his cell. Thanks to a promise that he made with Liang, Jyugo also frees Samon from his cell. However, Hajime knocks out Samon when the latter is furious that Jyugo can escape from prison anytime. Jyugo and Hajime take on another horde of surveillance dolls. Rock, Yamato and Seitarou continue to recover in the infirmary. Kenshiro heads towards Building 5, and Enki comes out of hiding.

==== Special ====
No. overall	No. in season	Title	Original release date
26 (OVA)	—	"Idiots with Student Numbers!" "Shusseki Bangō no Tsuita Baka-tachi!" (出席番号のついたバカたち！)	29 April 2017 (Note: The episode originally screened at the "Nanfes" event on 29 April 2017, and was later released on DVD on 26 July 2017.)
In this special episode, all characters appear as high school students and staff. Seitarou Tanabata, the new teacher of Nanba 13th High School, teaches waka to students Jyugo, Uno, Rock, Nico and Hitoshi Sugoroku, all of whom are heavily distracted during his lecture. Despite Jyugo and transfer student Musashi getting expelled for starting a fight behind the gym, administrator Okina Otogi convinces principal Kazari Otogi to pardon them. Hajime Sugoroku returns to class after his suspension period as a troublemaking student, being very attentive and remove any distractions from his classmates. Seitarou is later informed by policeman Kenshiro Yozakura that Hajime was suspended because he was harassed by the students of Nanba 5th High School. Hajime picks a fight with the students of Nanba 5th High School, but Seitarou stands in Hajime's way, causing the students of Nanba 5th High School to walk away. Seitarou is fired from Nanba 13th High School, as he reads a letter written by Hajime, who says that he works as a correctional officer at a juvenile prison. A ferry takes Seitarou to a high school with a classroom as an underground prison, where the only student is none other than Enki Gokuu.
