= Kinokoinu: Mushroom Pup =

Japanese manga series

- First tankōbon volume cover

きのこいぬ (Kinoko Inu)
- Genre: Comedy
- Manga
- Written by: Kimama Aoboshi
- Published by: Tokuma Shoten
- English publisher: NA: Digital Manga Publishing
- Magazine: Monthly Comic Ryū
- Original run: July 17, 2010 – February 28, 2022
- Volumes: 15
- Anime television series
- Directed by: Kagetoshi Asano
- Written by: Jin Tanaka
- Music by: Akiyuki Tateyama
- Studio: C-Station
- Licensed by: Crunchyroll
- Original network: AT-X, Tokyo MX, BS11, ABC
- Original run: October 3, 2024 – December 19, 2024
- Episodes: 12

Kinokoinu: Mushroom Pup (きのこいぬ, Kinoko Inu) is a Japanese manga series by Kimama Aoboshi. It was serialized in Tokuma Shoten's seinen manga magazine Monthly Comic Ryū from July 2010 to February 2022 and was collected in fifteen tankōbon volumes. The manga is licensed in North America by Digital Manga Publishing. An anime television series adaptation produced by C-Station aired from October to December 2024.

== Characters ==
Kinokoinu (きのこいぬ)
Voiced by: Daiki Kobayashi
Hotaru Yūyami (夕闇 ほたる, Yūyami Hotaru)
Voiced by: Yūto Uemura
Komako Amano (天野 こまこ, Amano Komako)
Voiced by: Anna Nagase
Itsuki Yara (矢良 いつき, Yara Itsuki)
Voiced by: Takuma Terashima
Plum (プラム, Puramu)
Voiced by: Misaki Kuno
Anzu Uehara (上原 あんず, Uehara Anzu)
Voiced by: Hinano
Tsubaki Uehara (上原 つばき, Uehara Tsubaki)
Voiced by: Sayaka Senbongi
Ayumi Amano (天野 あゆみ, Amano Ayumi)
Voiced by: Wataru Hatano

== Media ==
=== Manga ===
Written and illustrated by Kimama Aoboshi, Kinokoinu: Mushroom Pup was serialized in Tokuma Shoten's seinen manga magazine Monthly Comic Ryū from July 17, 2010, to February 28, 2022. Its chapters were collected into fifteen tankōbon volumes from October 13, 2011, to May 13, 2022. The series is licensed in English by Digital Manga Publishing.

No.	Original release date	Original ISBN	North American release date	North American ISBN
1	October 13, 2011	978-4-19-950267-5	July 30, 2014	978-1569703083
2	June 13, 2012	978-4-19-950297-2	December 31, 2014	978-1569703090
3	December 13, 2012	978-4-19-950316-0	—	—
4	May 13, 2013	978-4-19-950341-2	—	—
5	September 13, 2013	978-4-19-950354-2	—	—
6	August 12, 2016	978-4-19-950522-5	—	—
7	March 13, 2017	978-4-19-950556-0	—	—
8	November 13, 2017	978-4-19-950597-3	—	—
9	July 13, 2018	978-4-19-950634-5	—	—
10	February 13, 2019	978-4-19-950669-7	—	—
11	September 13, 2019	978-4-19-950686-4	—	—
12	May 13, 2020	978-4-19-950707-6	—	—
13	December 11, 2020	978-4-19-950726-7	—	—
14	August 12, 2021	978-4-19-950747-2	—	—
15	May 13, 2022	978-4-19-950778-6	—	—

=== Anime ===
An anime television series adaptation was announced on May 13, 2024. It is produced by C-Station and directed by Kagetoshi Asano, with Jin Tanaka handling series composition, Daisuke Endō designing the characters and Akiyuki Tateyama composing the music. The series aired from October 3 to December 19, 2024, on AT-X and other networks. The opening theme song is "Kinokoinu", performed by HY, while the ending theme song is "Heart B-b-beat!!", performed by Iberis&. Crunchyroll streamed the series.

==== Episodes ====
No.	Title	Directed by	Written by	Storyboarded by	Original release date
1	"Kinokoinu Is Born"; Transliteration: "Kinoko Inu Tanjō" (Japanese: きのこいぬたんじょう)	Kagetoshi Asano	Jin Tanaka	Kagetoshi Asano	October 3, 2024
2	"Kinokoinu and Hanako"; Transliteration: "Kinoko Inu to Hanako" (Japanese: きのこいぬとはなこ)	Kagetoshi Asano	Tamaho Ouchi	Kagetoshi Asano	October 10, 2024
3	"Where Are You Going, Oh, Kinokoinu?"; Transliteration: "Kinoko Inu yo Doko e Iku" (Japanese: きのこいぬよ どこへいく)	Shingo Kaneko	Jin Tanaka	Masayuki Kurosawa	October 17, 2024
4	"Kinokoinu, It's Time to Party"; Transliteration: "Kinoko Inu Pate Isuru" (Japanese: きのこいぬ ぱーてぃする)	Yuki Ikeda	Keiko Akazawa	Yoshimitu Yamashita	October 24, 2024
5	"Kinokoinu and Hiragana"; Transliteration: "Kinoko Inu to Aiueo" (Japanese: きのこいぬとあいうえお)	Ryosuke Miyake	Tamaho Ouchi	Keiko Azakawa, Ryosuke Miyake	October 31, 2024
6	"Kinokoinu and the Visitor"; Transliteration: "Kinoko Inu to Hōmonsha" (Japanese: きのこいぬとほうもんしゃ)	Keisuke Gōda	Tamaho Ouchi	Minato Mirai	November 7, 2024
7	"Kinokoinu's Sibling"; Transliteration: "Kinoko Inu no Kyōdai" (Japanese: きのこいぬのきょうだい)	Shingo Kaneko	Jin Tanaka	Hiromitsu Kanazawa, Kagetoshi Asano	November 14, 2024
8	"Kinokoinu Goes Shopping"; Transliteration: "Kinoko Inu no Kaimono" (Japanese: きのこいぬのかいもの)	Miho Nagisa	Tamaho Ouchi	Miho Nagisa	November 21, 2024
9	"Kinokoinu and the Smail"; Transliteration: "Kinoko Inu Tokata Mutsuri" (Japanese: きのこいぬとかたむつり)	Keiko Azakawa	Keiko Azakawa	Takeshi Inamoto	November 28, 2024
10	"Kinokoinu Is a Popular One"; Transliteration: "Kinoko Inu wa Nin Kimono" (Japanese: きのこいぬはにんきもの)	Michiru Itabisashi	Tamaho Ouchi	Yoshimitu Yamashita, Shingo Kaneko	December 5, 2024
11	"Kinokoinu Goes to the Beach"; Transliteration: "Kinoko Inu Umi e Iku" (Japanese: きのこいぬ うみへいく)	Ryosuke Miyake	Jin Tanaka	Ryosuke Miyake, Hifumi Sano	December 12, 2024
12	"The Mystery of Kinokoinu"; Transliteration: "Kinoko Inu no Nazo" (Japanese: きのこいぬのなぞ)	Hifumi Sano	Jin Tanaka	Kagetoshi Asano	December 19, 2024
