= 100% Pascal-sensei =

Japanese gag comedy manga series

- Cover of first manga volume

100%パスカル先生 (100% Pasukaru-sensei)
- Genre: Gag comedy
- Manga
- Written by: Yūji Nagai
- Published by: Shogakukan
- Magazine: CoroCoro Comics
- Original run: January 15, 2015 – October 15, 2018
- Volumes: 7
- Anime television series
- Directed by: Yo Miura
- Music by: Shunsuke Takizawa
- Studio: OLM
- Original network: JNN (TBS, MBS)
- Original run: April 15, 2017 – December 16, 2017
- Episodes: 36

100% Pascal-sensei (Japanese: 100%パスカル先生, Hepburn: 100% Pasukaru-sensei; lit. 100% Pascal Teacher) is a Japanese gag comedy manga series written and illustrated by Yūji Nagai. It was serialized in Shogakukan's CoroCoro Comic magazine from January 15, 2015, to October 15, 2018, and was compiled into seven tankōbon volumes on September 28, 2017. An anime television series adaptation by OLM, Inc. aired from April 15 to December 16, 2017. Crunchyroll later added the series to its streaming service.

== Story ==
The story centers on a mole named Pascal who is an elementary school teacher and so dumb he is unable to even write his name correctly. Pascal is whimsical and he does whatever he wants in his classroom.

== Characters ==
Pascal-sensei (パスカル先生, Pasukaru-sensei)
Voiced by: Hana Sato
Super Pascal (スーパーパスカル, Super Pasukaru)

A Pascal form similar to the Dragon Ball Z Super Saiyan form. The transformation to Super Pascal form is triggered by intense anger, lust for money, and sneezing, among other reasons.

1% Pascal (1%パスカル, 1% Pasukaru)

A minuscule Pascal with a size one one-hundredth of the normal Pascal.

Junior (パスカルジュニア, Pasukaru Jr.)
Voiced by: Kaori Maeda, Nako Eguchi, Takuro Nakagoku

A Pascal-like creature discovered on the moon. The most notable difference from Pascal Sensei is that Junior has only one, central eye. Several Juniors were found on the Moon. One was brought to Earth by Pascal as his son. Junior showed remarkably swift progression at school, becoming a first-class student in the second period, taking over the role as teacher in the third period, and the role of Principal in the fourth period. In an attempt to dethrone Junior, Pascal attempts various stratagems which cause Junior to both multiply and transform into various types of people (delinquents, models, old men, etc.)

0% Pascal/Masao Kiyono (0%パスカル / 清野正男, 0% Pasukaru/Kiyono Masao)
Voiced by: Shun Urachiyama

An old man wearing a Pascal costume. He stands in for Pascal when Pascal is absent.

Hayato Hayakawa (早川はやと, Hayakawa Hayato)
Voiced by: Yuki Kodaira

Hayato Hayakawa is a boy student who fills the roll of straight man. He is a common-sense person with a serious personality, but there are many times when he is made the butt of dirty jokes.

Chika (ちか)
Voiced by: Misako Tomioka

Hayato's classmate and similarly common sense sort of student. She sports a pink ponytail. When it comes to battle, Chika transforms into Super Chika (again: similar to Dragon Ball Z's Super Saiyan) and displays an alternate, fairly aggressive side to her personality.

Iwata (岩田)
Voiced by: Koji Takeda

Hayato's classmate. A surprisingly muscular elementary school student. Although he makes few appearances in the manga, he appears regularly in the anime. Iwata is a well-behaved student but is always eager to accept a challenge for physical contests such as fights.

Steve Kanamori (金森スティーブ, Kanamori Sutību)
Voiced by: Daiki Kobayashi

A very rich and egotistical transfer student who often competes with Pascal (instead of supporting Pascal, which is what the other students typically do). Like Pascal and Chika, Steve also transforms (into Super Steve).

Yuusuke Kitano (北野ゆうすけ, Kitano Yūsuke)
Voiced by: Shinya Hamazoe

A transfer student. A robot who has transferred to Class 4–1.

Hikaru Tachibana (立花ひかる, Tachibana Hikaru)
Voiced by: Yuka Maruyama

A delinquent female student who wears a helmet and rides a motorcycle.

Kirari Ijuuin (伊集院きらり, Ijūin Kirari)
Voiced by: Kaori Mizuhashi

A transfer student who loves playing video games. She does not appear in the manga.

Other Characters

Principal (校長, Kōchō)
Voiced by: Mitsuaki Hoshino

The school's principal.

Kawamoto (川本先生, Kawamoto-sensei)
Voiced by: Makoto Yasumura

The former 4-1 homeroom teacher. The principal said he quit suddenly (in the anime, it is revealed that he became YouTuber).

Noguchi (野口先生, Noguchi-sensei)
Voiced by: Ryousuke Morita
Poppio Campbell (ヌッキー・キャンベル, Nukkī Kyanberu)

A person who is believed to have invented pop quizzes. It seems that the "pop" in "pop quiz" comes from his name.

Brad Kanamori (金森ブラッド, Buraddo Kanamori)
Voiced by: Yutaka Aoyama

Steve's father.

Kawai (河合)
Voiced by: Kōki Miyata
Gregorio (グレゴリオ, Guregorio)
Voiced by: Hinata Tadokoro
Mr. DiCaprio (デカプリオ, Dekapurio)
Voiced by: Kouhei Kaieda
Miyamoto (宮本, Miyamoto)
Voiced by: Yasuyuki Kase
Physedine (ウンディーヌ, Undine)
Voiced by: Roko Takizawa
Yoshioka (吉岡, Yoshioka)
Voiced by: Shinji Kawada
Sasaki (佐々木, Sasaki)
Voiced by: Ryousuke Morita

== List of episodes ==
No.	Title	Original release date
1	"That Name is Pascal-sensei"; Transliteration: "Sono na mo Pasukaru-sensei" (Japanese: その名もパスカル先生)	April 15, 2017
1	"Perfect Plate"; Transliteration: "Pāfekuto Purēto" (Japanese: 完璧(パーフェクト)プレート)	April 15, 2017
2	"Horror! 100% Physical Examination"; Transliteration: "Kyōfu! 100% Shintai Kensa" (Japanese: 恐怖！100%身体検査)	April 22, 2017
2	"Perfect Plate"; Transliteration: "Pāfekuto Purēto" (Japanese: 完璧(パーフェクト)プレート)	April 22, 2017
2	"1% Pascal"; Transliteration: "1% Pasukaru" (Japanese: 1%パスカル)	April 22, 2017
3	"My Name is a Transfer`s Student"; Transliteration: "Mai Nēmu izu Tenkōsei" (Japanese: マイ ネーム イズ 転校生)	April 29, 2017
3	"Perfect Plate"; Transliteration: "Kanpeki Purēto" (Japanese: 完璧プレート)	April 29, 2017
4	"Defect of the Legend, Hikaru Tachibana"; Transliteration: "Densetsu no Furyō, Tachibana Hikaru" (Japanese: 伝説の不良、立花ひかる)	May 6, 2017
4	"Perfect Plate"; Transliteration: "Kanpeki Purēto" (Japanese: 完璧プレート)	May 6, 2017
4	"Kitano Yuusuke-kun's Code Lesson"; Transliteration: "Kitano Yūsuke Kimi no Angō Kōza" (Japanese: 北野ゆうすけ君の暗号講座)	May 6, 2017
5	"Watch Out for Nuki Tachi Test!"; Transliteration: "Nuki Uchi Tesuto ni Kiwotsukero!" (Japanese: ぬきうちテストに気をつけろ!)	May 13, 2017
5	"Perfect Plate"; Transliteration: "Kanpeki Purēto" (Japanese: 完璧プレート)	May 13, 2017
6	"This is May Disease of Rumors"; Transliteration: "Kore ga Uwasa no 5 Tsuki-Byō" (Japanese: これがウワサの5月病)	May 20, 2017
6	"Perfect Plate"; Transliteration: "Kanpeki Purēto" (Japanese: 完璧プレート)	May 20, 2017
6	"Pascalinglish Straight Outta America"; Transliteration: "Amerika Ōdan Pasuka Ringu Risshu" (Japanese: アメリカ横断パスカリングリッシュ)	May 20, 2017
7	"This is My Birthday Party"; Transliteration: "Disu Izu Tanjō Pātī" (Japanese: ディス イズ 誕生パーティー)	May 27, 2017
7	"Perfect Plate"; Transliteration: "Kanpeki Purēto" (Japanese: 完璧プレート)	May 27, 2017
8	"Staff`s Om You do Not"; Transliteration: "Anata no Shiranai Shokuin-Shitsu" (Japanese: あなたの知らない職員室)	June 3, 2017
8	"Perfect Plate"; Transliteration: "Kanpeki Purēto" (Japanese: 完璧プレート)	June 3, 2017
8	"A Practical Hieroglyphics Lesson"; Transliteration: "Ashita Tsukaeru Hierogurifu Kōza" (Japanese: 明日使えるヒエログリフ講座)	June 3, 2017
9	"Separate Fate Destiny"; Transliteration: "Unmei o Wakeru Sekigae" (Japanese: 運命を分ける席替え)	June 10, 2017
9	"Perfect Plate"; Transliteration: "Kanpeki Purēto" (Japanese: 完璧プレート)	June 10, 2017
9	"Kitano Yuusuke-kun's Code Lesson"; Transliteration: "Kitano Yūsuke Kimi no Angō Kōza" (Japanese: 北野ゆうすけ君の暗号講座)	June 10, 2017
10	"Do Not Get in! Kiken! Animal`s Classroom"; Transliteration: "Hairu na Kiken! Dōbutsu Kyōshitsu" (Japanese: 入るなキケン!動物教室)	June 17, 2017
10	"Perfect Plate"; Transliteration: "Kanpeki Purēto" (Japanese: 完璧プレート)	June 17, 2017
10	"1% Pascal"; Transliteration: "1-pāsento Pasukaru" (Japanese: 1%パスカル)	June 17, 2017
11	"Space Evacuation Drill"; Transliteration: "Supēsu Hinan Kunren" (Japanese: スペース避難訓練)	June 24, 2017
11	"Perfect Plate"; Transliteration: "Kanpeki Purēto" (Japanese: 完璧プレート)	June 24, 2017
11	"A Practical Hieroglyphics Lesson"; Transliteration: "Ashita Tsukaeru Hierogurifu Kōza" (Japanese: 明日使えるヒエログリフ講座)	June 24, 2017
12	"How to Grow Junior"; Transliteration: "Pasukaru Junia no Sodate-Kata" (Japanese: パスカルジュニアの育て方)	July 1, 2017
12	"Perfect Plate"; Transliteration: "Kanpeki purēto" (Japanese: 完璧プレート)	July 1, 2017
12	"Pascalinglish Straight Outta America"; Transliteration: "Amerika Ō dan Pasuka Ringu Risshu" (Japanese: アメリカ横断パスカリングリッシュ)	July 1, 2017
13	"Mystery Transfer`s Student. Kirari Ijuuin"; Transliteration: "Nazo no Tenkōsei, Ijūin Kirari" (Japanese: 謎の転校生、伊集院きらり)	July 8, 2017
13	"Perfect Plate"; Transliteration: "Kanpeki purēto" (Japanese: 完璧プレート)	July 8, 2017
13	"1% Pascal"; Transliteration: "1-pāsento Pasukaru" (Japanese: 1%パスカル)	July 8, 2017
14	"Pursuit!! Pascal-sensei"; Transliteration: "Tsuiseki!! Pasukaru-sensei" (Japanese: 追跡!! パスカル先生)	July 15, 2017
14	"Perfect Plate"; Transliteration: "Kanpeki Purēto" (Japanese: 完璧プレート)	July 15, 2017
14	"Yum! Pascal Gourmet"; Transliteration: "Zeppin! Pasukaru Gurume" (Japanese: 絶品! パスカルグルメ)	July 15, 2017
15	"100% Dangerous Swimming Pool"; Transliteration: "100-pāsento Denjara Supūru" (Japanese: 100%デンジャラスプール)	July 22, 2017
15	"Perfect Plate"; Transliteration: "Kanpeki Purēto" (Japanese: 完璧プレート)	July 22, 2017
15	"A Practical Hieroglyphics Lesson"; Transliteration: "Ashita Tsukaeru Hierogurifu Kōza" (Japanese: 明日使えるヒエログリフ講座)	July 22, 2017
16	"Enjoy! Rinoma School Part 1"; Transliteration: "Enjoi! Rinkan Gakkō Zenpen" (Japanese: エンジョイ!林間学校 前編)	July 29, 2017
16	"Perfect Plate"; Transliteration: "Kanpeki Purēto" (Japanese: 完璧プレート)	July 29, 2017
16	"Pascalinglish Straight Outta America"; Transliteration: "Amerika Ōdan Pasuka Ringu Risshu" (Japanese: アメリカ横断パスカリングリッシュ)	July 29, 2017
17	"Enjoy! Rinoma School Part 2"; Transliteration: "Enjoi! Rinkan Gakkō Kōhen" (Japanese: エンジョイ!林間学校 後編)	August 5, 2017
17	"Perfect Plate"; Transliteration: "Kanpeki Purēto" (Japanese: 完璧プレート)	August 5, 2017
17	"1% Pascal"; Transliteration: "1-pāsento Pasukaru" (Japanese: 1%パスカル)	August 5, 2017
18	"A Midsummer Heimahima Pascal"; Transliteration: "Manatsu no Himahima Pasukaru" (Japanese: 真夏のヒマヒマパスカル)	August 12, 2017
18	"Perfect Plate"; Transliteration: "Kanpeki Purēto" (Japanese: 完璧プレート)	August 12, 2017
18	"1% Pascal"; Transliteration: "1-pāsento Pasukaru" (Japanese: 1%パスカル)	August 12, 2017
19	"Pascal`s Produce Fireworks Festival"; Transliteration: "Pasukaru Purodeyūsu Hanabi Taikai" (Japanese: パスカル プロデュース 花火大会)	August 19, 2017
19	"Perfect Plate"; Transliteration: "Kanpeki Purēto" (Japanese: 完璧プレート)	August 19, 2017
19	"Kitano Yuusuke-kun's Code Lesson"; Transliteration: "Kitano Yūsuke Kimi no Angō Kōza" (Japanese: 北野ゆうすけ君の暗号講座)	August 19, 2017
20	"Pascal-sensei's Summer Vacation"; Transliteration: "Pasukaru-sensei no Natsuyasumi" (Japanese: パスカル先生の夏休み)	August 26, 2017
20	"Perfect Plate"; Transliteration: "Kanpeki Purēto" (Japanese: 完璧プレート)	August 26, 2017
20	"Yum! Pascal Gourmet"; Transliteration: "Zeppin! Pasukaru Gurume" (Japanese: 絶品! パスカルグルメ)	August 26, 2017
21	"Break Out! Rice of Ice Cream!"; Transliteration: "Boppatsu! Aisu no Ran!" (Japanese: 勃発! アイスの乱!)	September 2, 2017
21	"Perfect Plate"; Transliteration: "Kanpeki Purēto" (Japanese: 完璧プレート)	September 2, 2017
21	"Pascalinglish Straight Outta America"; Transliteration: "Amerika Ōdan Pasuka Ringu Risshu" (Japanese: アメリカ横断パスカリングリッシュ)	September 2, 2017
22	"Superior Pascal"; Transliteration: "Adauchi! Sūpā Pasukaru" (Japanese: 仇討ち! スーパーパスカル)	September 9, 2017
22	"Perfect Plate"; Transliteration: "Kanpeki Purēto" (Japanese: 完璧プレート)	September 9, 2017
22	"Pascalinglish Straight Outta America"; Transliteration: "Amerika Ōdan Pasuka Ringu Risshu" (Japanese: アメリカ横断パスカリングリッシュ)	September 9, 2017
23	"Yuusuke Kitano's Truth"; Transliteration: "Kitano Yūsuke no Shinjitsu" (Japanese: 北野ゆうすけの真実)	September 16, 2017
23	"Perfect Plate"; Transliteration: "Kanpeki Purēto" (Japanese: 完璧プレート)	September 16, 2017
23	"Yum! Pascal Gourmet"; Transliteration: "Zeppin! Pasukaru Gurume" (Japanese: 絶品! パスカルグルメ)	September 16, 2017
24	"Secret Pascal`s Room"; Transliteration: "Himitsu no Pasukaru-shitsu" (Japanese: 秘密のパスカル室)	September 23, 2017
24	"Perfect Plate"; Transliteration: "Kanpeki Purēto" (Japanese: 完璧プレート)	September 23, 2017
24	"A Practical Hieroglyphics Lesson"; Transliteration: "Ashita Tsukaeru Hierogurifu Kōza" (Japanese: 明日使えるヒエログリフ講座)	September 23, 2017
25	"Physical Earth Demon Lord Attack!!"; Transliteration: "Taiiku Dai Maō Shūrai!!" (Japanese: 体育大魔王 襲来!!)	September 30, 2017
25	"Perfect Plate"; Transliteration: "Kanpeki Purēto" (Japanese: 完璧プレート)	September 30, 2017
25	"Pascalinglish Straight Outta America"; Transliteration: "Amerika Ōdan Pasuka Ringu Risshu" (Japanese: アメリカ横断パスカリングリッシュ)	September 30, 2017
26	"Astray! 0% Pascal"; Transliteration: "Gyōten! 0-pāsento Pasukaru" (Japanese: 仰天!0%パスカル)	October 7, 2017
26	"Perfect Plate"; Transliteration: "Kanpeki Purēto" (Japanese: 完璧プレート)	October 7, 2017
26	"1% Pascal"; Transliteration: "1-pāsento Pasukaru" (Japanese: 1%パスカル)	October 7, 2017
27	"Cooking Practice King Decision Fight!"; Transliteration: "Chōri Jisshū-ō Kettei-sen!!" (Japanese: 調理実習王 決定戦!!)	October 14, 2017
27	"Perfect Plate"; Transliteration: "Kanpeki Purēto" (Japanese: 完璧プレート)	October 14, 2017
27	"Yum! Pascal Gourmet"; Transliteration: "Zeppin! Pasukaru Gurume" (Japanese: 絶品! パスカルグルメ)	October 14, 2017
28	"I am a Shadow Warrior"; Transliteration: "Ai Amu Kagemusha" (Japanese: アイ アム 影武者)	October 21, 2017
28	"Perfect Plate"; Transliteration: "Kanpeki Purēto" (Japanese: 完璧プレート)	October 21, 2017
28	"Pascal Poetry"; Transliteration: "Pasukaru Senryū" (Japanese: パスカル川柳)	October 21, 2017
29	"Falling Down! Kanamori`s Chaebol"; Transliteration: "Botsuraku!? Kanamori Zaibatsu" (Japanese: 没落!?金森財閥)	October 28, 2017
29	"Perfect Plate"; Transliteration: "Kanpeki Purēto" (Japanese: 完璧プレート)	October 28, 2017
29	"Pascal Poetry"; Transliteration: "Pasukaru Senryū" (Japanese: パスカル川柳)	October 28, 2017
30	"Who is the Savior!?"; Transliteration: "Kyūseishu wa Dareda?" (Japanese: 救世主は誰だ!?)	November 4, 2017
30	"Perfect Plate"; Transliteration: "Kanpeki Purēto" (Japanese: 完璧プレート)	November 4, 2017
30	"1% Pascal"; Transliteration: "1-pāsento Pasukaru" (Japanese: 1%パスカル)	November 4, 2017
31	"I Started Seeing Social Studies"; Transliteration: "Shakaika Kengaku Hajimemashita" (Japanese: 社会科見学はじめました)	November 11, 2017
31	"Perfect Plate"; Transliteration: "Kanpeki Purēto" (Japanese: 完璧プレート)	November 11, 2017
31	"Yum! Pascal Gourmet"; Transliteration: "Zeppin! Pasukaru Gurume" (Japanese: 絶品! パスカルグルメ)	November 11, 2017
32	"Manga Teacher Pascal!"; Transliteration: "Manzai-shi Pasukaru ya Detsu!" (Japanese: 漫才師パスカルやでっ!)	November 18, 2017
32	"Perfect Plate"; Transliteration: "Kanpeki Purēto" (Japanese: 完璧プレート)	November 18, 2017
32	"Pascal Poetry"; Transliteration: "Pasukaru Senryū" (Japanese: パスカル川柳)	November 18, 2017
33	"Idol Activities`s Pasmin!"; Transliteration: "Aidoru Katsudō Pasumin!" (Japanese: アイドル活動パスミン!)	November 25, 2017
33	"Perfect Plate"; Transliteration: "Kanpeki Purēto" (Japanese: 完璧プレート)	November 25, 2017
33	"Pascal Poetry"; Transliteration: "Pasukaru Senryū" (Japanese: パスカル川柳)	November 25, 2017
34	"Pascal-sensei's First Class"; Transliteration: "Pasukaru-sensei Hajimete no Jugyō" (Japanese: パスカル先生初めての授業)	December 2, 2017
34	"Perfect Plate"; Transliteration: "Kanpeki Purēto" (Japanese: 完璧プレート)	December 2, 2017
34	"Announcement of the Absolutely Best Student!"; Transliteration: "Saiyūshū Seito Dai Happyō!" (Japanese: 最優秀生徒 大発表!)	December 2, 2017
35	"Elementary School Final Battle Part 1"; Transliteration: "Kinoeda ko Chōjō Kessen Zenpen" (Japanese: きのえだ小 頂上決戦 前編)	December 9, 2017
35	"Perfect Plate"; Transliteration: "Kanpeki Purēto" (Japanese: 完璧プレート)	December 9, 2017
36	"Elementary School Final Battle Part 2"; Transliteration: "Kinoeda ko Chōjō Kessen Kōhen" (Japanese: きのえだ小 頂上決戦 後編)	December 16, 2017
36	"Perfect Plate"; Transliteration: "Kanpeki Purēto" (Japanese: 完璧プレート)	December 16, 2017

== Video games ==
A video game titled 100% Pascal-sensei: Kanpeki Paint Bombers (100%パスカル先生 完璧ペイントボンバーズ, 100% Pasukaru-sensei Kanpeki Peinto Bombaazu) was developed and published by Konami for the Nintendo 3DS in 2017.
