= Egumi Legacy =

Japanese card game and anime series

- Anime key visual

エグミレガシー (Egumiregashī)
- Genre: Card game (Game); Comedy (Anime)
- Anime television series
- Directed by: Masa Mori
- Written by: Masa Mori; Katsuya Kitano
- Music by: Kyohei Matsuno
- Studio: Studio Outrigger
- Licensed by: Medialink
- Original network: AT-X
- Original run: July 9, 2024 – September 24, 2024
- Episodes: 12
- icon

Egumi Legacy (Japanese: エグミレガシー, Hepburn: Egumiregashī) is a Japanese card game featuring original character design by voice actor Takuya Eguchi. The game was released as the 10th project in TAKALAKA & Eguchi's collaborative EGUMI brand in summer 2022. An anime television series based on the game's characters started airing in July 2024.

== Characters ==
The cast of Egumi Legacy; from left to right: Invisible Stalker, Cursed Guitar Case, Uninvited Guest, Careless Hachibei, Legendary Final Climax Bomb, End of the World, Golden Retriever, Wizard, God Eyes; the four characters at the most right side: top is Mohawk Dots, bottom is Villager, left is Center Part Checkers, right is Perm Stripe

Legendary Final Climax Bomb (Note: English character names were mentioned in the official promotional video.) (レジェンダリー・ファイナル・クライマックス・ボム, Rejendarī fainaru kuraimakkusu bomu)
Voiced by: Takuya Eguchi
End of the World (エンドオブザワールド, Endoobuzawārudo)
Voiced by: Yoshino Aoyama
Careless Hachibei (うっかりハチベー, Ukkarihachibee)
Voiced by: Soma Saito
Golden Retriever (ゴールデンレトリーバー, Gōrudenretorībā)
Voiced by: Yū Serizawa
Uninvited Guest (招かれざる客, Manekarezarukyaku)
Voiced by: Koutaro Nishiyama
Wizard (ウィザード, U~izādo)
Voiced by: Shin'ichiro Kamio
Cursed Guitar Case (呪いのギターケース, Noroi no gitākēsu)
Villager (村人, Murabito)
Voiced by: Wataru Komada
God Eyes (ゴッドアイ, Goddoai)
Wild Feces (ノグミ, Nogumi)
Voiced by: Wataru Hatano
Invisible Stalker (インビジブルストーカー, Inbijiburusutōkā)
Perm Stripe (パーマ・ストライプ, Pāma sutoraipu)
Voiced by: Daiki Kobayashi
Mohawk Dots (モヒカン・ドット, Mohikan dotto)
Voiced by: Yoshiki Nakajima
Center Part Checkers (センター分け・チェック, Sentā wake chekku)
Voiced by: Takato Okura

== Media ==
=== Anime ===
An anime television series was announced on April 19, 2024. The series is produced by Studio Outrigger and directed by Masa Mori, Masa Mori is also writing the script with Katsuya Kitano. Takuya Eguchi designed the original characters, and Kyohei Matsuno composing the music. The series premiered on July 9, 2024, on AT-X. The ending theme song is "P-P-P-PERO", performed by GNJB (原因は自分にある。, Gen'in wa jibun ni aru.). Medialink licensed this series and streaming this anime worldwide excluding Japan on Ani-One Asia YouTube channel.

==== Episodes ====
No.	Title (Note: All English titles are taken from Ani-One Asia episode subtitles.)	Original release date
1	"The Vanished Singer"; Transliteration: "Kieta utahime" (Japanese: 消えた歌姫)	July 9, 2024
2	"I Want To Be Invited"; Transliteration: "Maneka retai" (Japanese: 招かれたい)	July 16, 2024
3	"Ripper Demon"; Transliteration: "Chigiri debiru" (Japanese: ちぎりデビル)	July 23, 2024
4	"The Unseverable"; Transliteration: "Tachikirenai mono" (Japanese: 断ち切れないもの)	July 30, 2024
5	"For Whom the Guitar Plays"; Transliteration: "Dare ga tame ni gitā wa naru" (Japanese: 誰が為に ギターは鳴る)	August 6, 2024
6	"Take action" Transliteration: "Hashiridasu" (Japanese: 走り出す)	August 13, 2024
7	"Oblivious Miracle"; Transliteration: "Donkan mirakuru" (Japanese: 鈍感ミラクル)	August 20, 2024
8	"Is this Egumi Legacy?"; Transliteration: "Kore ga egumiregashī?" (Japanese: これがエグミレガシー?)	August 27, 2024
9	"Times that don't want to be torn apart" Transliteration: "Chigi raretakunai jikan" (Japanese: ちぎられたくない時間)	September 3, 2024
10	Transliteration: "Aru yoru no hoshi" (Japanese: ある夜の星)	September 10, 2024
11	Transliteration: "Saigo wa kono kyoku yo!" (Japanese: 最後はこの曲よ！)	September 17, 2024
12	"END of the WORLD"	September 24, 2024
