= Daiki Kobayashi =

Japanese voice actor (born 1991)

- 小林 大紀
- Born: 23 September 1991 (age 34)
- Occupations: Voice actor; singer
- Years active: 2015–present
- Employer: 81 Produce
- Notable work: The Idolmaster SideM as Saki Mizushima; Nanbaka as Niko; 100% Pascal-sensei as Steve Kanamori; Future Card Buddyfight Ace as Subaru Hoshiyomi; Egumi Legacy as Invisible Stalker/Perm Stripe; Kinokoinu: Mushroom Pup as Kinokoinu; Toilet-Bound Hanako-kun as Mitsuba

Daiki Kobayashi (Japanese: 小林 大紀, Hepburn: Kobayashi Daiki; born 23 September 1991) is a Japanese voice actor and singer from Toyonaka, affiliated with 81 Produce. He is known for starring as Saki Mizushima in The Idolmaster SideM, Niko in Nanbaka, Steve Kanamori in 100% Pascal-sensei, Subaru Hoshiyomi in Future Card Buddyfight Ace, Invisible Stalker/Perm Stripe in Egumi Legacy, and the titular main character of Kinokoinu: Mushroom Pup.

== Biography ==
Daiki Kobayashi, a native of Toyonaka, Osaka Prefecture, was born on 23 September 1991. He was inspired to go into voice acting after learning that Oha Suta host Koichi Yamadera would appear in the show's anime segments, and he started enjoying reading textbooks aloud and became interested in late-night anime. He then spent about half a year at a training school in Osaka during high school. He was later educated at Human Academy and 81 Actor's Studio, and he joined 81 Produce Junior on 1 April 2014.

In January 2016, it was announced that Kobayashi would star as the cross-dressing male idol Saki Mizushima in The Idolmaster SideM, a sub-franchise of The Idolmaster franchise; he subsequently received praise for his androgynous voice (which he was already known for at the time), with Kusuri Yūki from Net Lab praising it as "a perfect casting". Since then, he has performed as a singer on several Idolmaster music releases as part of the tie-in unit Cafe Parade, including the 2023 single "The Idolmaster SideM 49 Elements: 08: Cafe Parade" (which charted at #13 in the Oricon Singles Chart).

In 2016, Kobayashi was announced that he would star as Niko in Nanbaka. He later starred as Steve Kanamori in 100% Pascal-sensei and Subaru Hoshiyomi in Future Card Buddyfight Ace. He voiced Yasunari Semba in the 2023 film Maboroshi. In December 2023, he was cast as Mitsuru Tenma in Ensemble Stars!, after the character's previous voice actor, Junya Ikeda, was arrested for bank account fraud. In 2024, he starred as Invisible Stalker/Perm Stripe in Egumi Legacy and the titular main character of Kinokoinu: Mushroom Pup.

Kobayashi is androgynous, portraying androgynous characters with a feminine voice and cross-dressing on social media. He speaks the Osaka dialect.

== Filmography ==
=== Television animation ===
Year	Title	Role	Ref.
2015	Star-Myu	Student	
2016	All Out!!	Yoshiki Hirano	
2016	Beyblade Burst	Shinki Mikuni	
2016	Cardfight!! Vanguard G: GIRS Crisis	Participant	
2016	Nanbaka	Niko	
2016	Reikenzan: Hoshikuzu-tachi no Utage	Ōchū	
2017	100% Pascal-sensei	Steve Kanamori	
2017	ēlDLIVE	Assistant Inspector Chips	
2017	Just Because!	Kaoru Yamaguchi	
2017	Kamisama Minarai: Himitsu no Cocotama	Bells	
2017	Masamune-kun's Revenge	Akio Tanabe	
2017	Tsukipro The Animation	Young Shū Izumi	
2018	Cells at Work!	Campylobacter	
2018	Future Card Buddyfight Ace	Subaru Hoshiyomi	
2020	Toilet-Bound Hanako-kun	Sousuke Mitsuba	
2021	2.43: Seiin High School Boys Volleyball Team	Isao Igawa	
2021	Amaim Warrior at the Borderline	Mishima Tsubasa	
2021	Skate-Leading Stars	Shō Suzaki	
2021	That Time I Got Reincarnated as a Slime	Hermes	
2022	Classroom of the Elite	Ryōta Beppu	
2022	Platinum End	Keiichi Nakaumi	
2022	Sasaki and Miyano	Masaki Hanzawa	
2023	After-School Hanako-kun	Mitsuba	
2023	Ayakashi Triangle	Donpa	
2023	Duel Masters Win Duel Wars	Ken Ugata	
2023	Fushigi Dagashiya Zenitendō	Ichirō Kanbara	
2023	The Ancient Magus' Bride	Zoe Ivy	
2023	Vinland Saga	Schull	
2024	Egumi Legacy	Invisible Stalker, Perm Stripe	
2024	Kinokoinu: Mushroom Pup	Kinokoinu	
2024	Undead Unluck	Red	
2024	Wind Breaker	Yuri Kakiuchi	
2025	Wandance	Hoto, Uyo, Macchin	
2025	The Dark History of the Reincarnated Villainess	Kagura Ivy	
2026	Kusunoki's Garden of Gods	Raijin	

=== Animated film ===
Year	Title	Role	Ref.
2023	Maboroshi	Yasunari Semba	

=== Original net animation ===
Year	Title	Role	Ref.
2018	Pan to Boku no Momo-chan	Shiro	
2021	Rick and Morty: ~SUMMER meets GOD~ (Rick meets Evil)	Future Being	

=== Video games ===
Year	Title	Role	Ref.
2016	The Idolmaster SideM	Saki Mizushima	
2019	Arc the Lad R	Matthias	
2019	Op8	Sei Hoshizaki	
2020	Show by Rock!! Fes A Live	659 (Rokoku)	
2023	Ensemble Stars!	Mitsuru Tenma	
