= Maboroshi =

2023 Japanese animated film by Mari Okada

- Theatrical release poster

Japanese name
- Kanji: アリスとテレスのまぼろし工場
- Literal meaning: Alice and Therese's Illusory Factory
Transcriptions
- Revised Hepburn: Arisu to Teresu no Maboroshi Kōjō
- Directed by: Mari Okada
- Screenplay by: Mari Okada
- Produced by: Manabu Otsuka
- Starring: Junya Enoki; Reina Ueda; Misaki Kuno
- Cinematography: Yuusuke Tannawa
- Edited by: Ayumu Takahashi
- Music by: Masaru Yokoyama
- Production company: MAPPA
- Distributed by: Warner Bros. Pictures Japan
- Release date: September 15, 2023
- Running time: 111 minutes
- Country: Japan
- Language: Japanese

Maboroshi (Japanese: アリスとテレスのまぼろし工場, Hepburn: Arisu to Teresu no Maboroshi Kōjō; lit. 'Alice and Therese's Illusory Factory') is a 2023 Japanese animated science fantasy drama film. Produced by MAPPA and distributed by Warner Bros. Pictures Japan, the film is directed and written by Mari Okada. The film debuted in Japanese theaters on September 15, 2023, and was released worldwide on Netflix on January 15, 2024.

== Plot ==
Mifuse is a steel mill town in rural Japan. In January 1991, a catastrophic explosion at the mill isolates the town from the outside world, trapping it in an eternal winter. Mamoru Sagami, a mill worker and head priest, declares the disaster divine punishment for mining a sacred mountain. He convinces the townspeople to maintain their pre-disaster identities, submitting periodic ID forms, as he claims they are bound to a "sacred machine." Meanwhile, fissures occasionally open in the sky, only to be sealed by the mill's smoke.

Masamune Kikuiri, a student, discovers a feral girl, who he names Itsumi, in the steel mill blast furnace under the care of his classmate, Mutsumi. While bonding with Itsumi, Masamune learns conflicting theories about her origins, with Sagami claiming she is a "woman of the gods" and his uncle Tokimune hinting she doesn't belong in their world. As Masamune continues visiting Itsumi, the town's surreal nature becomes increasingly apparent.

The arrival of summer imagery through sky fissures coincides with escalating tensions. During a school test of courage, Masamune's classmate Sonobe starts to crack and vanishes when enveloped by mill smoke, sparking more doubts about the town's reality. Sagami asserts that their world, created by the sacred machine, is perfect and eternal. Tokimune, however, argues it is doomed to collapse.

Through revelations in his father's diary, Masamune learns Itsumi's true identity: Saki Kikuiri, a girl transported from the real world, and the town itself is a constructed reality. Determined to free Saki, Masamune enlists his classmates and disrupts Sagami's ritual to offer her to the sacred machine. During an Obon festival visible through the fissures, Masamune and Mutsumi rescue Saki and place her on a freight train bound for the real world. After a climactic chase, Mutsumi leaps off the train to reunite with Masamune, allowing Saki's train to escape.

Years later, Saki returns as an adult to a deserted Mifuse. Reflecting on her past as Itsumi, she visits the steel mill's remnants, where farewell messages and memories of her previous life remain preserved.

== Voice cast ==
| Character | Japanese | English |
|---|---|---|
| Masamune Kikuiri | Junya Enoki | Max Mittelman |
| Mutsumi Sagami/Mutsumi Kikuiri | Reina Ueda | Jeannie Tirado |
| Itsumi/Saki Kikuiri | Misaki Kuno | Kitana Turnbull |
| Akimune Kikuiri | Kōji Seto | Robbie Daymond |
| Tokimune Kikuiri | Kento Hayashi | Isaac Robinson-Smith |
| Daisuke Sasakura | Taku Yashiro | Jonathan Leon |
| Atsushi Nitta | Tasuku Hatanaka | David Errigo Jr. |
| Yasunari Senba | Daiki Kobayashi | Brandon Engman |
| Yūko Sonobe | Ayaka Saitō | Lizzie Freeman |
| Hina Hara | Maki Kawase | Valerie Rose Lohman |
| Reina Yasumi | Yukiyo Fujii | Madeline Dorroh |
| Mamoru Sagami | Setsuji Satō | Andrew Kishino |

== Production ==
Maboroshi is produced by MAPPA, written and directed by Mari Okada, with Yuriko Ishii designing the characters, and Masaru Yokoyama composing the music. Much of the animation staff from Maquia: When the Promised Flower Blooms worked on the film.

== Release ==
The film was distributed by Warner Bros. Pictures Japan, who released the film in theaters on September 15, 2023. Miyuki Nakajima performed the film's main theme, "Shin-on". Netflix has acquired the global rights to the film and released it, as simply Maboroshi, on their platform on January 15, 2024.

=== Marketing ===
Okada wrote a novelization of the film, which Kadokawa Shoten published under their Kadokawa Bunko imprint on June 13, 2023.

== Reception ==
=== Critical response ===
On the review aggregator website Rotten Tomatoes, 67% of 9 critics' reviews are positive, with an average rating of 7.1/10.

On Decider, Brittany Vincent gave the film a "Stream It" recommendation, praising its "intriguing setup, excellent animation, and gorgeous visual style," while noting that its mature and mysterious narrative provides a "well worth it" payoff. Joshua Fox of Screen Rant gave the film a score of 4 out of 10, writing: "Maboroshi is a complete and utter mess of a film," praising its phenomenal art, animation, and music, but heavily criticizing its "hackneyed melodrama, terrible placing, and bad writing."

Elijah Gonzalez for The A.V. Club gave it a mixed-to-positive review, praising its "visceral bildungsroman" narrative, "thorny" characters, and MAPPA's effective visualization of a "stifling" backdrop, but ultimately feeling the final stretch faltered by trading its oppressive specificity for a conventional romance and a "particularly objectionable fixation." Richard Eisenbeis of Anime News Network praised the film as "visually stunning" with a "solid cast of characters", highly commending its detailed '90s setting and how it uses a surreal thought experiment to dive deeply into human nature, though he noted it is not the absolute best anime Mari Okada has ever written.

Josh A. Stevens of Anime UK News praised the film as a "fascinating" and "gloriously unfiltered" work of an auteur, highly commending its tightly written script, three-dimensional characters, and studio MAPPA's "stunning" animation, though he noted its transgressive themes make it a "cinematic curio" that will not be for everyone. Allen Moody of THEM Anime Reviews found it to be more "allegorical than science fiction per se," noting that while director Mari Okada's projects are always interesting, Maboroshi is hampered by "myriad narrative contradictions, a disorienting setup, and a sudden personality transformation for heroine Mutsumi" that felt like a mere plot contrivance.

=== Accolades ===
Maboroshi won the Mainichi Film Award for Best Animation Film in 2023. In March 2024, the film won a Kabuku Award at the Niigata Int'l Animation Film Festival.
