= Congqian Youzuo Lingjianshan =

Chinese web novel series

- Congqian Youzhuo Lingjianshan
- Poster

从前有座灵剑山 (China) 霊剣山 (Japan) (Reikenzan)
- Genre: Comedy, Fantasy, Magic
- Novel series
- Written by: Guowang Bixia
- Original run: June 29, 2013 – July 26, 2015
- Manga
- Written by: Guowang Bixia
- Illustrated by: Zhuhua and Junxiaomo (豬畫×菌小莫)
- Original run: August 8, 2014 – present
- Anime television series

Reikenzan: Hoshikuzu-tachi no Utage
- Directed by: Iku Suzuki
- Produced by: Lu Xingchen
- Written by: Iku Suzuki
- Music by: Ryō Kawasaki
- Studio: Studio Deen
- Original network: AT-X, Tokyo MX, KBS, Sun TV, TV Aichi, bilibili
- Original run: January 9, 2016 – March 25, 2016
- Episodes: 12
- Anime television series

Reikenzan: Eichi e no Shikaku
- Directed by: Susumu Nishizawa
- Produced by: Tang Yunkang; Itsuo Miyamoto
- Written by: Susumu Nishizawa
- Music by: Ryō Kawasaki
- Studio: Studio Deen
- Original network: AT-X, Tokyo MX, KBS, Sun TV, TV Aichi, bilibili
- Original run: January 7, 2017 – March 26, 2017
- Episodes: 12
- icon

Congqian Youzuo Lingjianshan (从前有座灵剑山, literally "There was once a Spirit Blade Mountain") is a Chinese xianxia web novel series written by Guowang Bixia (国王陛下, a pen name meaning "His Majesty the King"), and a manhua version was hosted on the Tencent comics portal since 2014. An anime adaptation co-produced by Tencent and Studio Deen, and named Reikenzan: Hoshikuzu-tachi no Utage (霊剣山 星屑たちの宴; literally "Spirit Blade Mountain: Feast of the Stardust") aired in January to March 2016, which was simulcast in Chinese and Japanese. A second season aired from January to March 2017. A live-adaptation TV series, Once Upon a Time in Lingjian Mountain, was released in 2019.

== Plot ==
In order to find a child fated by a falling comet that will bring calamity, the "Lingjian" (灵剑) clan resumes its entrance examination process to find disciples. Wang Lu, who possesses a special soul that only appears once in a thousand years, decides to take the exam and goes down the path toward becoming an exceptional sage.

== Characters ==
Wang Lu / Ōriku (王陸)
Voiced by: Slayerboom (Chinese), Tsubasa Yonaga (Japanese)
The main protagonist. A genius whose IQ and impudence are unmatched.
Wang Wu / Ōbu (王舞)
Voiced by: Sidao Huizhang (Chinese), Yuriko Yamaguchi (Japanese)
Wang Lu's master who has a very wicked tongue.
Wang Zhong / Ōchū (王忠)
Voiced by: Ding Dang (Chinese), Daiki Kobayashi (Japanese)
Wang Lu's attendant who looks like a girl but is a boy.
Fengyin / Fūin (风吟)
Voiced by: Tute Hameng (Chinese), Kenichirou Matsuda (Japanese)
The master of the "Lingjian" school.
Hai Yunfan / Kaiunho (海云帆)
Voiced by: Tianxuan Xinghe (Chinese), Masakazu Nishida (Japanese)
Wang Lu's friend and fellow student.
Wen Yin / Bunin (文茵)
Voiced by: Zhang Bingbing (Chinese), Nako Eguchi (Japanese)

== Media ==
=== Manhua ===
- Spirit Blade Mountain

=== Anime ===
An anime television series based on the series premiered on January 8, 2016. The series is directed by Iku Suzuki and animated by Studio Deen, with character designs by Makoto Iino. Yumiko Ishii serves as the chief animation director. Hirofune Hane serves as art director, Kazuhisa Yamabu provides color key for the series, and Kazuya Tanaka is directing the sound, which is produced by Half HP Studio.

The opening theme is "Fast End", performed by Soraru and Mafumafu, and the ending theme song is "Kizuna" (Bonds), performed by Kakichoco. The series aired on AT-X, Tokyo MX, KBS Kyoto, Sun TV, and TV Aichi.

A second season aired from January 8 to March 26, 2017.

==== Episode list ====
===== Season 1 (2016) =====
No.	Title	Original release date
1	"The Celestial Method!"; Transliteration: "Shōsen taikai!" (Japanese: 昇仙（しょうせん）大会！)	January 8, 2016
2	"At the End of Utopia"; Transliteration: "Tōgenkyō no hate ni" (Japanese: 桃源郷の果てに)	January 15, 2016
3	"Challenge Upon Challenge"; Transliteration: "Sara naru shiren" (Japanese: 更なる試練)	January 22, 2016
4	"At the End of Eternity"; Transliteration: "Yūkyū no toki o koe te" (Japanese: 悠久の時を超えて)	January 29, 2016
5	"At Wuxiang Peak"; Transliteration: "Musōhō nite" (Japanese: 無相峰にて)	February 5, 2016
6	"Wuxiang Jian'gu Style, 98th Edition"; Transliteration: "Musō kenkotsu, dai kyū jū hachi han" (Japanese: 無相剣骨（むそうけんこつ）、第98版)	February 12, 2016
7	"The Trial at Azure Cloud Peak!"; Transliteration: "Seiunhō shiren!" (Japanese: 青雲峰試練！)	February 19, 2016
8	"The Disappearance of Wang Wu!"; Transliteration: "Ōbu shissō su!" (Japanese: 王舞失踪す！)	February 26, 2016
9	"The Flash of Wuxiang Jian'gu"; Transliteration: "Musō kenkotsu no hirameki" (Japanese: 無相剣骨の閃き)	March 4, 2016
10	"The Girl Who Became a Sacrifice"; Transliteration: "Ikenie ni natta shōjo" (Japanese: 生贄になった少女)	March 11, 2016
11	"Lingjian Faction vs Shengjing Xianmen!"; Transliteration: "Reiken ha bāsasu seikyō senmon!" (Japanese: 霊剣派vs盛京仙門！)	March 18, 2016
12	"The Calm Before the Storm"; Transliteration: "Arashi no mae no seijaku" (Japanese: 嵐の前の静寂)	March 25, 2016

===== Season 2 (2017) =====
No. overall	No. in season	Title	Original release date
13	1	Transliteration: "Kikyou" (Japanese: 帰郷)	January 8, 2017
14	2	Transliteration: "Tatakai no Hajimari" (Japanese: 戦いの始まり)	January 15, 2017
15	3	Transliteration: "Shinkyou Setsuritsu" (Japanese: 新教設立)	January 22, 2017
16	4	Transliteration: "Houdan" (Japanese: 法壇)	January 29, 2017
17	5	Transliteration: "Sennin e no Michi" (Japanese: 仙人への道)	February 5, 2017
18	6	Transliteration: "Kengen Nekketsu Kou" (Japanese: 乾元燃血功)	February 12, 2017
19	7	Transliteration: "Kecchaku" (Japanese: 決着)	February 19, 2017
20	8	Transliteration: "Ketsuunkyou" (Japanese: 血雲峡)	February 26, 2017
21	9	Transliteration: "Saikai" (Japanese: 再会)	March 5, 2017
22	10	Transliteration: "Shoukan" (Japanese: 召喚)	March 12, 2017
23	11	Transliteration: "Monshinken" (Japanese: 問心剣)	March 19, 2017
24	12	Transliteration: "Aratanaru Tabidachi" (Japanese: 新たなる旅立ち)	March 26, 2017
