= Wataru Hatano =

Japanese voice actor (born 1982)

- 羽多野 渉
- Born: March 13, 1982 (age 44); Asahi, Nagano, Japan
- Other name: Kaze Haruno (春野風)
- Occupations: Voice actor; Singer; Actor; Narrator; Radio MC; Comedian
- Years active: 1999–present (as Comedian) 2001–present (as Voice Actor)
- Agent: 81 Produce
- Height: 171 cm (5 ft 7 in)
- Spouse: Mai Hashimoto (m. 2018)
- Website: haoto.main.jp

Wataru Hatano (羽多野 渉, Hatano Wataru; born March 13, 1982) is a Japanese voice actor, singer, actor, narrator, radio MC and comedian affiliated with 81 Produce. At the 2nd Seiyu Awards in 2008, Hatano won the Best Male Rookie Award for his roles as Sam Houston in Toward the Terra and Tenshi Yuri in Saint Beast: Kouin Jojishi Tenshitan. Other major roles voiced include Sōjin Tokita in Sen no Hatō, Tsukisome no Kōki, Haruta Shigemo in Jujutsu Kaisen, Gajeel Redfox in Fairy Tail, Metal Bat in One Punch Man and Yūto Ayase in Nogizaka Haruka no Himitsu. In video games, he voices Josuke Higashikata in the CyberConnect2 developed JoJo's Bizarre Adventure games, and Rufus in the Street Fighter franchise. On April 2, 2018, he announced his marriage with fellow voice actress Mai Hashimoto.

== Career ==
After passing the summer audition held by Amuse, he attended the Voice Actor Talent Department of Amusement Media Academy as a special student, and later became a member of 81 after attending the 81 Produce Acting Institute (a training school directly under 81).

After playing the role of an announcer in an original drama CD by Takehito Koyasu (while still at the vocational school), he made his debut in 2001 in the TV drama version of Timecop (same as above). In the same year, he made his TV anime debut with "Yobarete Tobidete! Akubi-chan" (same as above).

In 2008, he won the 2nd Seiyu Awards for New Actor.

On December 21, 2011, he made his debut as a singer under his own name with the single "Hajimari no Hi ni".

In 2025, he won the 19th Seiyu Awards for Kids/Family.

== Filmography ==
=== Anime ===
List of voice performances in anime
Year	Title	Role	Notes	Source
2001	Yobarete, Tobidete! Akubi-chan	Kodaira Kōichi		
2002	Monkey Typhoon	Garuma		
2003	Pluster World	Monitoring mechanism / grip group 監視メカ/グリップ族		
2003	Zatch Bell!	Soldier		
2003	Detective School Q	Fuji SawaHiroshi / Sakuma sound / Echidna 富士沢博/佐久間響/エキドナ		
2003	Avenger	Citizen		
2003	Cromartie High School	Manuel High badass マニエル高ワル		
2003	Galaxy Railways	Edwin Silver, Terry Goldman		
2003	Full-Blast Science Adventure - So That's How It Is	Stray cat 野良猫		
2003	Maburaho	Male student		
2004	Gokusen	Kamei-sensei		
2004	Yumeria	Tomokazu Mikuri		
2004	Monkey Turn	Player		
2004	Tenjo Tenge	Salaryman サラリーマン		
2004	Hanaukyo Maid Team La Verite	Coma Ke Staff コマケスタッフ		
2004	Doki Doki School Hours	Arakawa-sensei		
2004	The Marshmallow Times	Thunder / Edward / Small Fairies サンダー/エドワード/スモールフェアリーズ		
2004	Midori Days	Various characters		
2004	Madlax	Garza soldiers		
2004	Wagamama Fairy: Mirumo de Pon!	Tetsuo		
2004	Ragnarok the Animation	Goblin, Bandit		
2004	Monkey Turn V	TadoMitsuru 田胴満		
2004	Viewtiful Joe	Darling ダーリン		
2004	Uta Kata	Shigeru		
2004	Zoids Fuzors	Man		
2004	Desert Punk	Kameido 亀井戸		
2004	Fantastic Children	Soran		
2004	Bleach	Harutoki / Grim Reaper and / Bohaha to 4 / Shinigami ベースのハルトキ/死神と/ボハハ～4/死神え		
2004	Gakuen Alice	Male student		
2004–10	Major series	Various characters		
2005	Starship Operators	Defense official		
2005–06	Ah! My Goddess series	Various characters		
2005–06	Fushigiboshi no Futagohime series	Truth		
2005	MÄR	Hameln		
2005	Mushiking: The King of Beetles	Villager		
2005	He Is My Master	Guards		
2005	Basilisk	Koshirō Chikuma, Young Kōga Danjō		
2005–06	Honey and Clover	Shin		
2005	Eureka Seven	Captain		
2005–06	Ah My Buddha series	Willow		
2005	My Wife is a High School Girl	Male student		
2005	Guyver: The Bioboosted Armor	resistance レジスタンス		
2005	Animal Yokocho	Various characters		
2005	Hell Girl	Daisuke Iwashita		
2005	Gunparade March	Field reporter		
2005	Aria the Animation	Himeya		
2006	Magikano	Shinichi		
2006	Nerima Daikon Brothers	Various characters		
2006	Gakuen Heaven: Boy's Love Hyper	Student		
2006	Aria the Natural	Atsushi		
2006	Ouran High School Host Club	Ritsu Kasanoda		
2006	Renkin 3-kyū Magical? Pokān	Ryouga, Tan, General		
2006	Spider Riders	Various characters		
2006	Kirarin Revolution	Aseyama director		
2006	Tsubasa Reservoir Chronicle	Hi妖 / minions 秘妖/手下	2nd series	
2006	Kishin Houkou Demonbane	Voice of the warrior 戦士の声		
2006	Welcome to the NHK	Akito Sudo / Dragoon / Suitorareru III II 須藤瑛人/竜騎士/スイトラレールIII世		
2006	Night Head Genesis	Yukio Izumi		
2006	Shonen Onmyoji	Emperor		
2006	D.Gray-man	Bounty Hunter		
2006	Red Garden	Emilio		
2006	Hell Girl	Shinzaburo	season 2	
2006	Bartender	Young Shimaoka		
2007	Les Misérables: Shōjo Cosette	Combeferre		
2007	Deltora Quest	Audience		
2007	Yes! Pretty Cure 5	Man		
2007	Naruto: Shippuden	Yahiko (boy)		
2007	Saint Beast: Kouin Jojishi Tenshitan	Tenshi Yuri		
2007	Engage Planet Kiss Dum	Vice captain		
2007	Kishin Taisen Gigantic Formula	IFujiUshio 井藤潮		
2007	Darker than Black	Jean		
2007	Toward the Terra	Sam Houston		
2007	Blue Dragon	Gustav		
2007	Mushi-Uta	Centipede		
2007	The Familiar of Zero: Knight of the Twin Moons	Henry Stalford		
2008	Porphy no Nagai Tabi	Prince		
2008	Kirarin Revolution Stage3	Takoji Higashida		
2008	Blassreiter	Igor		
2008	Zettai Karen Children	Ken McGuire, You Fujiura		
2008	Our Home's Fox Deity.	Gyokuyou		
2008	Soul Eater	Harvar D. Éclair		
2008	Monochrome Factor	Shūichi Wagatsuma		
2008–09	Nogizaka Haruka no Himitsu series	Yūto Ayase	Also Fina OVA in 2012	
2008	Blade of the Immortal	Makoto		
2008	Battle Spirits: Shounen Toppa Bashin	Manabu		
2008	Akane Iro ni Somaru Saka	Junichi Nagase		
2009	Gokujō!! Mecha Mote Iinchō	Nerima Daikon		
2009	Tears to Tiara	Decimus		
2009	Hanasakeru Seishōnen	Leon レオン		
2009	07-GHOST	Haruse		
2009	Tokyo Magnitude 8.0	Ryuta Kusakabe		
2009	Battle Spirits: Shounen Gekiha Dan	Shura		
2009	Miracle Train: ōedo-sen e Yōkoso	Shinjuku Nishiguchi one 新宿西口一		
2009–11	Kimi ni Todoke	Toru Sanada		
2009	Sasameki Koto	Norio Kazama		
2009	Kuchu Buranko	Yasukawa Hiromi		
2010–19	Fairy Tail	Gajeel Redfox		
2010	Beyblade: Metal Masters	Dashan Wang		
2010	Katanagatari	Shirasagi Maniwa		
2010	The Legend of the Legendary Heroes	Rigwaltz Pentest		
2011	I Don't Like You at All, Big Brother!!	Received 受	9 episodes	
2011	Beyblade: Metal Fury	Dashan Wang		
2011	A Bridge to the Starry Skies	Daigo Minamikokubaru		
2011	Tono to Issho: Gantai no Yabō	Yoshihiro Shimazu, others		
2011	The World God Only Knows	Yuta	season 2	
2011	Heaven's Memo Pad	Tomio Kimura		
2011	The Idolmaster	Host		
2011	The Mystic Archives of Dantalian	Granville brother		
2011	Battle Spirits: Heroes	Yakushiji Arata		
2011	Sengoku Paradise Kiwami	Tokugawa Ieyasu		
2011	Sekai-ichi Hatsukoi	Ichimura	season 2	
2011	Mobile Suit Gundam AGE	Largan Drace		
2012	Listen to Me, Girls. I Am Your Father!	Yuta Segawa	Also OVA in 2013	
2012	Shirokuma Cafe	Handa-kun		
2012	Pretty Rhythm Dear My Future	Yun-su ユンス		
2012–15	Haiyore! Nyaruko-san series	Yoichi Takehiko		
2012	Jormungand	Lutz		
2012	Chitose Get You!!	Hiroshi Kashiwabara		
2012	Muv-Luv Alternative: Total Eclipse	Leon Kuze		
2012–13	Magi: The Labyrinth of Magic series	Spartos		
2012	B-Daman Fireblast	Kagero Ogami		
2013	Hunter × Hunter	Shaiapouf		
2013	Maoyu	Lieutenant General		
2013	Zettai Karen Children – The Unlimited – Hyobu Kyosuke	You Fujiura		
2013	Valvrave the Liberator	Takumi Kibukawa		
2013	Dog & Scissors	Kiyoshi Inukai		
2013	Stella Women's Academy, High School Division Class C^{3}	ChoJiro 丁次郎		
2013–15	Ace of Diamond	Tōru Masuko		
2014	Hamatora	Murasaki	Also Re:	
2014	Engaged to the Unidentified	Hakuya Mitsumine		
2014	Strange+	Kaori		
2014	No-Rin	Kei Kamatori		
2014	The Kindaichi Case Files R	Aino Shuji 藍野修治		
2014–15	Baby Steps	Hiroshi Araya		
2014	Soul Eater Not!	Harvar D. Éclair		
2014	Bakumatsu Rock	Harada Sanosuke 原田左之助		
2014	Momo Kyun Sword	Inugami		
2014	Bonjour♪Sweet Love Patisserie	Jin Aoi		
2015	Kamisama Hajimemashita	Jirou	season 2	
2015	Kuroko's Basketball	Reo Mibuchi	season 3	
2015	World Break: Aria of Curse for a Holy Swordsman	Sir Edward Lampard		
2015	Triage X	St. Yuki 聖雄基		
2015	Aquarion Logos	Seiji Ootsuka		
2015	Jitsu wa Watashi wa	Sakurada		
2015	Junjo Romantica	Shinnosuke Todo 藤堂進之介	season 3	
2015–16	The Asterisk War	AR-D		
2015–present	One Punch Man	Metal Bat		
2015–17	Star-Myu: High School Star Musical	Sakuya Sazanami		
2015	Dance with Devils	Lindo Tachibana		
2016	KonoSuba	Keith		
2016	Hundred	Fritz Granz		
2016	Bungo Stray Dogs	Motojirō Kajii		
2016	And you thought there is never a girl online?	Apricot (male)		
2016	Rin-ne	Yuuki-kun		
2016	Magi: Adventure of Sinbad	Mystras		
2016	ReLIFE	Kōshi Usa		
2016	The Heroic Legend of Arslan: Dust Storm Dance	Jaswant		
2016	Fudanshi Kōkō Seikatsu	Ryo Sakaguchi		
2016	Tsukiuta. The Animation	Kai Fuduki		
2016	Time Travel Girl	Edison		
2016	Magic★Kyun! Renaissance	Louis Anjō		
2016	Nobunaga no Shinobi	Oda Nobunaga		
2016	Yuri on Ice	Georgi Popovich		
2016	Bungo Stray Dogs 2	Motojirō Kajii		
2017	ACCA: 13-ku Kansatsu-ka	Gurus		
2017–25	My Hero Academia	Hitoshi Shinsou		
2017	Sakura Quest	Katsuki Kumano		
2017	Hitorijime My Hero	Natsuo		
2017	Dive!!	Ooshima Chikara		
2017	Nana Maru San Batsu	Ashiya Yousuke		
2018	Killing Bites	Yūya Nomoto		
2018–21	IDOLiSH7	Gaku Yaotome		
2018	Sanrio Danshi	Naoki Sugami		
2018	Magical Girl Ore	Sakuyo Mikage		
2018	The Thousand Musketeers	Rapp		
2018–20	Muhyo & Roji's Bureau of Supernatural Investigation	Page Klaus		
2018	Dakaichi	Kiyotaka Arisu		
2018	Captain Tsubasa	Hikaru Matsuyama		
2019	Manaria Friends	Owen		
2019	Over Drive Girl 1/6	Haruto Bōida		
2019	I'm From Japan	Hide		
2019	Bungo Stray Dogs 3	Motojirō Kajii		
2019	Ensemble Stars!	Adonis Otogari		
2019	Didn't I Say to Make My Abilities Average in the Next Life?!	Nano		
2020	A3!	Chikage Utsuki		
2020	Uchitama?! Have you seen my Tama?	Gon Noda		
2020	The Misfit of Demon King Academy	Shin Reglia		
2020	Tsukiuta. The Animation 2	Kai Fuduki		
2020	Moriarty the Patriot	Benjamin Burton		
2021	Bungo Stray Dogs Wan!	Kajii Motojirō		
2021	Jujutsu Kaisen	Haruta Shigemo		
2021	Shadows House	Edward		
2021	Muteking the Dancing Hero	George		
2021	The Night Beyond the Tricornered Window	Rihito Hiyakawa		
2021	Super Crooks	Praetorian		
2022	Orient	Hideo Kosameda		
2022	Yashahime: Princess Half-Demon	Meidomaru		
2022	The Yakuza's Guide to Babysitting	Rei Hojo		
2022	Duel Masters Win	Jashin-kun		
2022	Mamekichi Mameko NEET no Nichijō	Simba, Poniki		
2022	Reincarnated as a Sword	Klimt		
2022	Bibliophile Princess	Theodore Warren Ashelard		
2022	Bleach: Thousand-Year Blood War	Hidetomo Kajōmaru		
2023	The Legendary Hero Is Dead!	Belarco		
2023	Mushoku Tensei: Jobless Reincarnation 2	Timothy		
2023	Jujutsu Kaisen Season 2	Haruta Shigemo		
2023	Captain Tsubasa Season 2: Junior Youth Arc	Hikaru Matsuyama		
2023	My Daemon	Kouya Kokonoe		
2024	The Demon Prince of Momochi House	Takamura Nachi		
2024	The Wrong Way to Use Healing Magic	Hyriluk		
2024	Vampire Dormitory	Komori		
2024	Shy Season 2	Century		
2024	I Parry Everything	Sein		
2024	Egumi Legacy	God Eye		
2024	Sengoku Youko	Ashikaga Yoshiteru		
2024	Uzumaki	Okada		
2024	Rurouni Kenshin: Kyoto Disturbance	Anji Yukyūzan		
2024	Duel Masters Lost: Tsuioku no Suishō	Abyssbell = Jashin Emperor		
2024	Kinokoinu: Mushroom Pup	Ayumi Amano		
2025	I Want to Escape from Princess Lessons	Nadir		
2025	The Mononoke Lecture Logs of Chuzenji-sensei	Takeshi Kōda/Takebō		
2026	Fate/strange Fake	Orlando Reeve		
TBA	Junket Bank	Keiichi Shishigami		

=== Film ===
List of voice performances in film
Year	Title	Role	Notes	Source
2007	Takumi-kun Series: Soshite Harukaze ni Sasayaite	Michio Yoshizawa	Live action movie	
2011	Kami Voice	Kubodera Tatsuma 久保寺辰真		
2012	Buta	Roux ルー	short film	
2012	Fairy Tail the Movie: Phoenix Priestess	Gajeel Redfox		
2015	The Laws of the Universe Part 0	Eisuke		
2017	Fairy Tail: Dragon Cry	Gajeel Redfox		
2017	Dance with Devils: Fortuna	Lindo Tachibana		
2020	Saezuru Tori wa Habatakanai – The Clouds Gather	Chikara Dōmeki		
2021	Dakaichi: Spain Arc	Kiyotaka Arisu		
2023	Fate/strange Fake: Whispers of Dawn	Orlando Reeve		
2025	Detective Conan: One-eyed Flashback	Atsunobu Hayashi		
2026	To You in the Beyond	Shūji Aiba		

=== Tokusatsu ===
- Kamen Rider Saber (2020), Yeti Megid (ep. 16 – 18)

=== Video games ===
List of voice performances in video games
Year	Title	Role	Notes	Source
2004	Croket! games	Lemonade, Archer, Yuba		
2005	Atelier Iris 2: The Azoth of Destiny	Felt Blanchimont	PS2	
2005	Shadow Hearts: From The New World	Zonta ゾンタ	PS1 / PS2	
2005	Zoids: Tactics	Wolf Muroa ヴォルフ・ムーロア	PS2	
2005	Tales of Legendia	Poppo	PS2	
2006	Shin Onimusha Dawn of Dreams	Roberto Frois ロベルト・フロイス	PS1 / PS2. Adopted son of Luis Frois.	
2006	Animal Yokochou: Doki*Doki Shinkyuu Shiken! no Kan	Papa	Other	
2006	Growlanser: Heritage of War	Guroma / narration グローマー/ナレーション	PS1 / PS2	
2006	Lamento ~Beyond the Void~	Asato	PC Adult	
2006	Palais de Reine	Walther ヴァルター	PC; October will be released in 2006	
2007	Elvandia Story	Rushiddo ルシッド	PS1 / PS2	
2008	Zettai Karen Children DS: Dai-4 no Children	Ken McGwire, Mug heat person (マグ熱人)	DS	
2008	Da Capo: Girls Symphony	Kei Shinomiya	PC	
2008	Monochrome Factor Cross Road	Azuma Akiichi 我妻秋一	PS1 / PS2	
2009	Street Fighter IV	Rufus	PS3, Also Ultra	
2009	Shining Force Feather	Jin	DS	
2009	Arc Rise Fantasia	Nicole Benex ニコル・ベネックス	Wii	
2009	Tears to Tiara Anecdotes: The Secret of Avalon	Decimus	PS3	
2009	Final Fantasy XIII	Yuj	PS3	
2010	Super Street Fighter IV	Rufus	PS3	
2010	Last Ranker	Makisu マキス	PSP	
2010	Fate/Extra	Julius Berukisuku-Harwey / Katsuragi-sensei ユリウス・ベルキスク・ハーウェイ/葛木センセイ	PSP	
2010	Hoshizora e Kakaru Hashi	Daigo Minamikokubaru	PC Adult; As Kaze Haruno, Also AA in 2014	
2011	Tales of the World: Radiant Mythology 3	Poppo ポッポ	PSP	
2011	Disgaea 4	Fenrich	PS3	
2011	Kajiri Kamui Kagura	Friction ORa night 摩多羅夜行	PC Adult; Haruno wind name	
2011	Final Fantasy XIII-2	Yuju ユージュ	PS3	
2012	Even in the game, Listen to Me, Girls. I Am Your Father!	Segawa Yuta 瀬川祐太	PSP	
2012	Mobile Suit Gundam AGE games	Largan Drace	PSP	
2013	Muv-Luv Alternative Total Eclipse	Leon Kuze レオン・クゼ	PS3, Xbox 360	
2013	JoJo's Bizarre Adventure: All Star Battle	Josuke Higashikata		
2015	Gakuen Heaven 2: Double Scramble	Hayato Chiba	PSP, other	
2015	JoJo's Bizarre Adventure: Eyes of Heaven	Josuke Higashikata		
2015	Ensemble Stars!	Adonis Otogari		
2016	Dance with Devils	Lind Tachibana		
2016	Hakuoki: Yuugiroku Tai-shi-tachi no dai enkai	Kotaro Motoyama 本山小太郎	Other	
2017	Tsukitomo -Tsukiuta 12 memories-	Kai Fuduki 文月海	PS Vita	
2017	Bungō Stray Dogs: Mayoi Inu Kaikitan	Kajii Motojirō	iOS, Android	
2019	Atelier Lulua: The Scion of Arland	Fickes Finis	PS4, Switch, PC	
	CV: Casting Voice			
	IDOLISH7	Gaku Yaotome	multimedia project	
	Action Taimanin	Fuuma Kotarou ふうま 小太郎	iOS, Android, PC	
2020	Arknights	Chiave	iOS, Android	
2020	Helios Rising Heroes	Brad Beams	iOS, Android	
2021	Gate of Nightmares	Esteo, Nord	iOS, Android	
	Ikémen Prince: Beauty and Her Beast	Keith Howell	iOS, Android	
2022	Identity V	Norton Campbell/Prospector/"Fool's Gold"	iOS, Android, PC	
2023	Ys X: Nordics	Leif Yvelise		
2024	Persona 3: Reload	Kenji Tomochika	PlayStation 4, PlayStation 5, Windows, Xbox One, Xbox Series X/S	

=== Drama CDs ===
List of voice performances in drama CDs
Year	Title	Role	Notes	Source
2010	The Rose of Versailles series	Bernard Chatelet, others		
2012	No-Rin	KashintoriTsugi 過真鳥継		
2013	Fate/extra	Katsuragi-sensei		
2016	Bungo Stray Dogs	Kajii Motojirō	Character Song Mini Album Vol.3	
2017	Bungo Stray Dogs	Kajii Motojirō	Welcome to Hot Springs (Port Mafia)	
2019	Rakka Ryuusui no Hoshi	Gotaro Sumeragi		
	Akane Iro ni Somaru Saka	Junichi Nagase		
	Nogizaka Haruka no Himitsu series	Yūto Ayase		
	Saezuru Tori wa Habatakanai	Chikara Doumeki		
	Strange+	Kaori		
	Comical Psychosomatic Medicine	Ryō Shinnai		
	Udagawa-chō de Mattete yo	Momose		

=== Other dubbing ===
List of voice performances in overseas dubbing
Title	Role	Dub for	Notes	Source
Chappie	Deon Wilson	Dev Patel		
A Haunting in Venice	Maxime Gérard	Kyle Allen		
Power Rangers Samurai	Mike/Green Samurai Ranger	Hector David Jr.		
Prom Night	Bobby	Scott Porter		
A Single Man	Kenny Potter	Nicholas Hoult		
The Taking of Tiger Mountain	Jimmy	Han Geng		

List of dubbing performances in animation
Year	Title	Role	Notes	Source
2008-present	Thomas the Tank Engine and Friends	Winston, Luke and Harold		
2014	A Turtle's Tale: Sammy's Adventures	Sammy		

=== Character Song ===
List of character songs
Year	Release date	Album	Role	Track title	note
2013	July 5	Sayonara Yume Hanabi	Kai Fuduki	「Sayonara Yume Hanabi」 「Sasa no Ha Love Letter」	Character song of TSUKIUTA。
2014	July 25	Kimi ni Hana wo、Kimi ni Hoshi wo	Kai Fuduki; Shun Shimotsuki	「Kimi ni Hana wo、Kimi ni Hoshi wo」	Character song of TSUKIUTA。
2014	November 28	Celestite	Kai Fuduki; Shun Shimotsuki	「Celestite」	Character song of TSUKIUTA。
2015	March 27	ONE CHANCE？	Procellarum	「ONE CHANCE？」	Character song of TSUKIUTA。
2015	July 31	Beast Master	Kai Fuduki	「Beast Master」 「Toumei Lullaby」	Character song of TSUKIUTA。
2015	October 21	Mademo★iselle	PENTACLE★	「Mademo★iselle」	Dance with Devils Ending Song
2015	October 28	Ensemble☆Stars! UNIT SONG CD Vol.1「UNDEAD」	UNDEAD	「Melody in the Dark」 「Hanī Miruku wa Okonomi de」	Character song of Ensemble☆Stars!
2015	December 2	Secret Night	TRIGGER	「Secret Night」 「NATSU☆Shiyouze！」 「Leopard Eyes」	Character song of IDOLiSH7
2016	February 12	Procellarum Best Album 「Shirotsuki」	Kai Fuduki	「Sayonara Yume Hanabi」	Character song of TSUKIUTA。
2016	August 26	TSUKIUTA。 THE ANIMATION Theme Song	Procellarum	「LOLV -Lots of Love-」	Character song of TSUKIUTA。 THE ANIMATION
2016	September 28	Ensemble☆Stars! UNIT SONG CD 2nd vol.01「UNDEAD」	UNDEAD	「DESTRUCTION ROAD」 「Darkness 4」	Character song of Ensemble☆Stars!
2016	October 5	Bungo Stray Dogs Character Song Mini Album Vol. 3	Kajii Motojirō	「An Inquiry into Irreversible Phenomena, With Specific Regard To Changes of State」	Character song of Bungō Stray Dogs
2016	October 26	Magic-kyun！No. 1☆	ArtiSTARs	「Magic-kyun！No. 1☆」 「Give you! Smile♡」	Opening theme of Magic★kyun！Renaissance anime
2016	October 26	Please kiss my heart	ArtiSTARs	「Please kiss my heart」 「Dare Yori mo I love you」	Ending theme of Magic★kyun！Renaissance anime
2017	January 11	Music-kyun♪Memories	ArtiSTARs	「Dear my special」 「Art Session!!!!!!!」	Character song of Magic★kyun！Renaissance
2017	February 24	TSUKIUTA。 THE ANIMATION Volume 6	Kai Fuduki	「mare~Kimi to Tsudzuru Koukai Nisshi~」	Character song of TSUKIUTA。 THE ANIMATION
2017	March 24	TSUKIUTA。 THE ANIMATION Volume 7	Six Gravity & Procellarum	「Tsuki no Uta。」	Character song of TSUKIUTA。 THE ANIMATION
2017	September 20	REGALITY	TRIGGER	「SECRET NIGHT」 「NATSU☆Shiyouze！」 「Last Dimension ~Hikigane O Hiku No Wa Dare Da~」 「Leopard Eyes」 「Negai wa Shine on the Sea」 「DAYBREAK INTERLUDE」	Character song of IDOLiSH7
2017	September 20	REGALITY	Gaku Yaotome	「Shiawase de Ite」	Character song of IDOLiSH7
2017	September 20	REGALITY	TRIGGER	「In the meantime」 「DESTINY」	Character song of IDOLiSH7
2017	October 4	ENSEMBLE STARS! UNIT SONG CD 3RD VOLUME 05 2Wink	2Wink feat. UNDEAD	「TRICK with TREAT!!」	Character song of Ensemble☆Stars!
2017	October 4	ENSEMBLE STARS! UNIT SONG CD 3RD VOLUME 06 UNDEAD	2Wink feat. UNDEAD	「Gate of the Abyss」 「Break the Prison」	Character song of Ensemble☆Stars!
2018	February 28	Heavenly Visitor	TRIGGER	「Heavenly Visitor」 「DIAMOND FUSION」	Character song of IDOLiSH7
2018	July 7	Welcome, Future World!!!	IDOLiSH7, TRIGGER & Re:vale	「Welcome, Future World!!! (short ver.)」	Character song of IDOLiSH7
2018	August 16	12 SONGS GIFT	Gaku Yaotome	「Associate」	Character song of IDOLiSH7
2018	August 29	ALBUM SERIES PRESENT -UNDEAD-	UNDEAD	「Melody in the Dark」 「Gate of the Abyss」 「Darkness 4」 「Break the Prison」 「Hanī Miruku wa Okonomi de」 「DESTRUCTION ROAD」 「Valentine Eve's Nightmare」	Character song of Ensemble☆Stars!
2018	August 29	ALBUM SERIES PRESENT -UNDEAD-	Adonis Otogari	「Saql Faith」	Character song of Ensemble☆Stars!
2018	September 26	IDOLiSH7 Collection Album vol.1	Pythagoras Trio	「Danshi Tarumono！～MATSURI～」	Character song of IDOLiSH7
2018	October 3	A3! VIVID SPRING EP	Harugumi	「Haru Desu Ne.」 「Usotsuki wa Mahou no Hajimari」 「The Pride of the Knights」	Character song of A3!
2018		A3! VIVID SPRING EP	Chikage Utsuki	「Petenshi no Yuutsu」 「Seeds」	Character song of A3!

== Discography ==
=== Singles ===
#	Year	Release date	Title	Catalog no	Chart positions	Notes
#	Year	Release date	Title	Catalog no	Oricon Singles Charts	Notes
1st	2011	December 21	"Hajimari no Hi ni"	AVCA-49133; AVCA-49132/B	36	–
2nd	2012	June 27	"Ryūsei Hikō"	AVCA-49695; AVCA-49694/B	38	–
3rd	2013	March 13	"Kimi wa Boku ga Kaeru Basho"	AVCA-62228; AVCA-62227/B	38	–
4th	2014	February 19	"Hikari"	AVCA-74229; AVCA-74227/B; AVCA-74228/B	29	Ending theme of Hamatora anime
5th	2015	October 14	"Kakusei no Air"	EYCA-10583; EYCA-10582/B	14	Opening theme of Dance with Devils anime
6th	2016	March 9	"Unmei no Coda"	EYCA-10787; EYCA-10786/B	23	Opening theme of Dance with Devils game
7th	2016	November 23	"You Only Live Once"	EYCA-11244; EYCA-11243/B	22	Ending theme of YURI!!! on ICE anime, *Note: artist listed as "YURI!!! on ICE feat. w.hatano"
8th	2017	July 12	"Heart Signal"	EYCA-11462; EYCA-11462/B	29	Opening theme of Hitorijime My Hero anime
9th	2017	November 22	"KING & QUEEN"	EYCA-11680; EYCA-11679/B	24	Theme song of Dance with Devils -Fortuna- movie
10th	2019	November 27	"Fuwari Fuwari"	EYCA-12623/B	33	

=== Albums ===
Title	Album details	Peak chart
W	Released: October 22, 2014; Label: DIVE II entertainment; Formats: CD, digital download	25
Caravan wa Philia wo Kanaderu	Released: December 21, 2016; Label: DIVE II entertainment; Formats: CD, digital download	40
Futuristic	Released: December 12, 2018; Label: DIVE II entertainment; Formats: CD, digital download	39
