= Rumble Garanndoll =

Japanese anime television series

- Key visual

逆転世界ノ電池少女 (Gyakuten Sekai no Denchi Shōjo)
- Genre: Mecha
- Anime television series
- Directed by: Masaomi Andō
- Written by: Makoto Uezu
- Music by: Yūsuke Shirato
- Studio: Lerche
- Licensed by: Funimation: SA/SEA: Muse Communication
- Original network: AT-X, Tokyo MX, ytv, BS11
- Original run: October 11, 2021 – December 27, 2021
- Episodes: 12
- Manga
- Written by: Left Hand
- Published by: Kadokawa Shoten
- Magazine: Comic Newtype
- Original run: October 12, 2021 – July 26, 2022
- Volumes: 2
- Novel series

Gyakuten Sekai no Denchi Shōjo: Garan Senki
- Written by: Ukyō Kodachi
- Published by: Kakuyomu
- Original run: December 16, 2021 – February 8, 2022

Rumble Garanndoll (Japanese: 逆転世界ノ電池少女, Hepburn: Gyakuten Sekai no Denchi Shōjo; transl. "World-Twisting Battery Girls") is an original Japanese anime television series animated by Lerche. It aired from October to December 2021. A manga adaptation with art by Left Hand has been serialized online via Kadokawa Shoten's Comic Newtype manga website from October 2021, and a web novel by Ukyō Kodachi titled Gyakuten Sekai no Denchi Shōjo: Garan Senki (逆転世界ノ電池少女 伽藍戦記) was serialized on Kakuyomu from December 2021 to February 2022.

== Characters ==
Hosomichi Kudō (久導細道, Kudō Hosomichi)
Voiced by: Seiichiro Yamashita (Japanese); Nazeeh Tarsha (English)
Rin Akagi (赤城りん, Akagi Rin)
Voiced by: Fairouz Ai (Japanese); Lindsay Seidel (English)
Yuki Aoba (蒼葉夕紀, Aoba Yuki)
Voiced by: Aina Suzuki (Japanese); Sarah Wiedenheft (English)
Misa Kuroki (黒木ミサ, Kuroki Misa)
Voiced by: Shiori Izawa (Japanese); Terri Doty (English)
Akatsuki Shinonome (東雲アカツキ, Shinonome Akatsuki)
Voiced by: Takuma Terashima (Japanese); Adam Gibbs (English)
Hayate Makami (真神ハヤテ, Makami Hayate)
Voiced by: Rina Hidaka (Japanese); Sara Secora (English)
Musashi Sashigami (佐斯神ムサシ, Sashigami Musashi)
Voiced by: Yukiyo Fujii (Japanese); Tia Ballard (English)
Yakumo Kamizuru (神水流ヤクモ, Kamizuru Yakumo)
Voiced by: Shino Shimoji (Japanese); Kayli Mills (English)
Balzac Yamada (バルザック山田, Baruzakku Yamada)
Voiced by: Tomokazu Sugita (Japanese); Brendan Blaber (English)
Mimi Kagurazaka (神楽坂ミミ, Kagurazaka Mimi)
Voiced by: Aki Toyosaki (Japanese); Katelyn Barr (English)
Anjū Munakata (宗方安寿, Munakata Anjū)
Voiced by: Takamitsu Fukuchi (Japanese); Alejandro Saab (English)
Ukai (鵜飼)
Voiced by: Kenichirou Matsuda
Megane (メガネ)
Voiced by: Takahiro Mizushima
Cap (キャップ, Kyappu)
Voiced by: Shōta Hayama (Japanese); Stephen Fu (English)
Pocha (ポチャ)
Voiced by: Hayato Kaneko

== Media ==
=== Anime ===
The 12-episode original anime project was revealed on April 2, 2021. It is produced by Lerche and is directed by Masaomi Andō and written by Makoto Uezu. Original character designs are provided by Akio Watanabe, while Keiko Kurosawa adapts the designs for animation. Larx Entertainment is producing the 3DCG animation, with Daisuke Katō serving as the CG director. Egg Firm is producing the series. The series aired from October 11 to December 27, 2021, on AT-X, Tokyo MX, ytv, and BS11. Mia Regina performed the opening theme song "Fever Dreamer", while Aina Suzuki performed the ending theme song "Reverse-Rebirth". Funimation licensed the series outside of Asia. Muse Communication licensed the series in South and Southeast Asia.

On December 5, 2021, Funimation announced that the series would receive an English dub, which premiered the following day.

==== Episode list ====
| No. | Title | Directed by | Written by | Storyboarded by | Original release date |
|---|---|---|---|---|---|
| 1 | "I'd Like to Turn the Tables With You (If Possible)!"; Transliteration: "Kimi to (Dekireba) Gyakuten Shitai!" (Japanese: きみと（出来れば）逆転したい！) | Yoshihito Nishōji | Kuzuryū | Masaomi Andō | October 11, 2021 |
| 2 | "I Want to Believe in You (Somehow)!" (Note: Title written as 君を（なんとか）信じたい！！ in the episode.); Transliteration: "Kimi o (Nantoka) Shinjitai!" (Japanese: きみを（なんとか）信じたい！) | Kōsaku Taniguchi | Kuzuryū | Yoshihito Nishōji | October 18, 2021 |
| 3 | "See That? A (Surprisingly) Stunning Comeback!"; Transliteration: "Mita ka! (Masaka no) Dai Gyakuten!!" (Japanese: 見たか！（まさかの）大逆転！！) | Kōshō Tora, Mitsuyo Yokono | Kuzuryū | Gōichi Iwahata | October 25, 2021 |
| 4 | "No Matter What, I'll be an Idol (The Last in Japan)!"; Transliteration: "Nantettatte (Nihon Saigo no) Watashi wa Aidoru!" (Japanese: なんてったって（日本最後の）私はアイドル！) | Shin'ichirō Kimura | Yasuhiro Nakanishi | Shin'ichirō Kimura | November 1, 2021 |
| 5 | "I Mean, I'm an Idol (No Matter What Anyone Says)!"; Transliteration: "Nantettatte (Dare ga Nan to Iō to) Watashi wa Aidoru!" (Japanese: なんてったって（誰が何と言おうと）私はアイドル！) | Yūsuke Kamada | Yasuhiro Nakanishi | Hiromitsu Kanazawa | November 8, 2021 |
| 6 | "The Akiba Apocalypse Revelation (That No One Asked For)!"; Transliteration: "Ima Akasō (Kiitenai Kedo) Akiba Mokushiroku!" (Japanese: 今明かそう（聞いてないけど）アキバ黙示録！) | Shin'ichirō Kimura | Kuzuryū | Tomoyo Ōhashi | November 15, 2021 |
| 7 | "(Come Out!) The Best Way to Live as a Shut-In!"; Transliteration: "(Detekoi!) Hakoiri Seikatsu no Susume!" (Japanese: （出てこい！）箱入り生活のススメ！) | Takahiro Tanaka | Hayato Kazeno | Hitoyuki Matsui | November 22, 2021 |
| 8 | "(Welcome!) The Best Way to Live as a Shut-In!"; Transliteration: "(Yōkoso!) Hakoiri Seikatsu no Susume!" (Japanese: （ようこそ！）箱入り生活のススメ！) | Yūsuke Kamada | Hayato Kazeno | Tadahito Matsubayashi | November 29, 2021 |
| 9 | "The (Hilarious) Akiba Apocalypse Revelation!"; Transliteration: "Ima Akasō (Shōshi) Akiba Mokushiroku!" (Japanese: 今明かそう（笑止）アキバ黙示録！) | Kōsaku Taniguchi | Kuzuryū, Yasuhiro Nakanishi, Hayato Kazeno | Tadahito Matsubayashi | December 6, 2021 |
| 10 | "Look at That! Turning the Tables (of Treachery)!"; Transliteration: "Mita ka! (Uragiri no) Dai Gyakuten!" (Japanese: 見たか！（裏切りの）大逆転！) | Shin'ichirō Kimura | Kuzuryū | Hiromitsu Kanazawa | December 13, 2021 |
| 11 | "I Want to Believe in You (This Time)!"; Transliteration: "Kimi o (Ima Koso!) Shinjitai!" (Japanese: 君を（今こそ！）信じたい！) | Yūsuke Kamada | Kuzuryū | Yūsuke Kamada | December 20, 2021 |
| 12 | "I Want to Turn the Tide With You (and Everyone Else)!"; Transliteration: "Kimi to (Minna de!) Gyakuten Shitai!" (Japanese: きみと（みんなで！）逆転したい！) | Kōsaku Taniguchi, Masaomi Andō | Kuzuryū | Hiromitsu Kanazawa, Masaomi Andō | December 27, 2021 |

=== Manga ===
A manga adaptation with art by Left Hand was serialized online via Kadokawa Shoten's Comic Newtype manga website from October 12, 2021, to July 26, 2022. It has been collected in two tankōbon volumes.

| No. | Japanese release date | Japanese ISBN |
|---|---|---|
| 1 | February 26, 2022 | 978-4-04-112091-0 |
| 2 | September 9, 2022 | 978-4-04-112843-5 |
