= I Saved Myself with a Potion! =

Japanese light novel series

- I Saved Myself with a Potion!: Life in Another World
- First light novel volume cover, featuring Kaede Yakumo

ポーション、わが身を助ける (Pōshon, Waga Mi o Tasukeru)
- Genre: Fantasy; Isekai
- Novel series
- Written by: Akira Iwafune
- Published by: Shōsetsuka ni Narō
- Original run: April 10, 2014 – September 21, 2024
- Light novel
- Written by: Akira Iwafune
- Illustrated by: Sunaho Tobe
- Published by: Shufunotomo
- English publisher: NA: Hanashi Media
- Imprint: Hero Bunko
- Original run: April 27, 2015 – present
- Volumes: 12
- Manga
- Written by: Akira Iwafune
- Illustrated by: Sunaho Tobe
- Published by: Shufunotomo
- Magazine: Hero Comics
- Original run: September 29, 2023 – present
- Anime television series
- Directed by: Mikiko Furukawa
- Music by: bermei.inazawa
- Studio: Imagica Infos; Imageworks Studio
- Licensed by: SA/SEA: Medialink
- Original network: Tokyo MX
- Original run: October 3, 2025 – December 19, 2025
- Episodes: 12
- icon

I Saved Myself with a Potion!: Life in Another World (ポーション、わが身を助ける, Pōshon, Waga Mi o Tasukeru; lit. 'The Potions Save Myself') is a Japanese light novel series written by Akira Iwafune and illustrated by Sunaho Tobe. It was serialized online from April 2014 to September 2024 on the user-generated novel publishing website Shōsetsuka ni Narō. It was later acquired by Shufunotomo, who have published twelve volumes since April 2015 under their Hero Bunko imprint. A manga adaptation with art by Tobe has been serialized online via Shufunotomo's Hero Comics manga website since September 2023. A "light anime" television series adaptation produced by Imagica Infos and Imageworks Studio aired from October to December 2025.

== Premise ==
Kaede Yakumo, a high school girl, awakens in a fantasy world and finds that someone has left a mysterious book in her backpack containing instructions for crafting healing potions. Kaede begins selling potions to financially support herself, and later becomes involved with an adventuring party.

== Characters ==
Kaede Yakumo (八雲 楓, Yakumo Kaede)
Voiced by: Kaede Hondo
Karudeno (カルデノ)
Voiced by: Yū Kobayashi
Asuru (アスル)
Voiced by: Takeo Ōtsuka
Nina (ニナ)
Voiced by: Miharu Hanai
Rei (レイ)
Voiced by: Yurika Moriyama

== Media ==
=== Light novel ===
Written by Akira Iwafune, I Saved Myself with a Potion!: Life in Another World was initially serialized on the user-generated novel publishing website Shōsetsuka ni Narō from April 10, 2014, to September 21, 2024. It was later acquired by Shufunotomo who began publishing the series with illustrations by Sunaho Tobe under their Hero Bunko light novel imprint on April 27, 2015, with twelve volumes released as of September 30, 2026.

In December 2025, Hanashi Media announced that they had licensed the series for English publication.

No.	Original release date	Original ISBN	English release date	English ISBN
1	April 27, 2015	978-4-07-413185-3	April 16, 2026	978-1-961788-57-2
2	December 28, 2015	978-4-07-414345-0	July 30, 2026	978-1-961788-69-5
3	July 30, 2016	978-4-07-419058-4	October 30, 2026	978-1-961788-86-2
4	August 31, 2017	978-4-07-427365-2	January 30, 2027	979-8-953136-09-9
5	February 28, 2019	978-4-07-436967-6	—	—
6	April 27, 2020	978-4-07-443878-5	—	—
7	April 30, 2021	978-4-07-448433-1	—	—
8	September 30, 2022	978-4-07-453210-0	—	—
9	September 29, 2023	978-4-07-456289-3	—	—
10	September 30, 2024	978-4-07-460486-9	—	—
11	September 29, 2025	978-4-07-462479-9	—	—
12	September 30, 2026	978-4-07-464627-2	—	—

=== Manga ===
A manga adaptation illustrated by Tobe began serialization on Shufunotomo's Hero Comics manga website on September 29, 2023.

=== Anime ===
A "light anime" television series adaptation was announced on July 31, 2025. It is produced by AnimationID, animated by Imagica Infos and Imageworks Studio and directed by Mikiko Furukawa, with bermei.inazawa composing the music. The series aired from October 3 to December 19, 2025, on Tokyo MX. (Note: Tokyo MX listed the season premiere on October 2 at 25:00, which is effectively October 3 at 1:00 a.m. JST.) The opening theme song is "Koi no Magic Potion" (恋のマジックポーション; 'Love's Magic Potion'), while the ending theme song is "MIRACRAID", both performed by TRiDENT. Medialink licensed the series in South and Southeast Asia for streaming on Ani-One Asia's YouTube channel.
