= The Weakest Tamer Began a Journey to Pick Up Trash =

Japanese light novel series

- First light novel volume cover

最弱テイマーはゴミ拾いの旅を始めました。 (Saijaku Teimā wa Gomihiroi no Tabi o Hajimemashita)
- Genre: Fantasy, isekai
- Novel series
- Written by: Honobonoru500
- Published by: Shōsetsuka ni Narō
- Original run: August 9, 2018 – present
- Light novel
- Written by: Honobonoru500
- Illustrated by: Nama
- Published by: TO Books
- English publisher: NA: Seven Seas Entertainment
- Imprint: TO Bunko
- Original run: November 9, 2019 – present
- Volumes: 17
- Manga
- Written by: Honobonoru500
- Illustrated by: Tou Fukino
- Published by: TO Books
- English publisher: NA: Seven Seas Entertainment
- Imprint: Corona Comics
- Magazine: Comic Corona
- Original run: February 10, 2020 – present
- Volumes: 8
- Manga

Shiritsu Ōdoguzu Gakuen Chū-tō-bu!
- Written by: Honobonoru500
- Illustrated by: Amamori
- Published by: TO Books
- Imprint: Corona Comics
- Magazine: Comic Corona
- Original run: November 21, 2022 – August 19, 2024
- Volumes: 3
- Anime television series
- Directed by: Shigeyasu Yamauchi (Note: Credited as Chief Director (総監督, Sō Kantoku)); Naoki Horiuchi
- Written by: Katsuhiko Takayama
- Music by: Kujira Yumemi
- Studio: Studio Massket
- Licensed by: Crunchyroll (streaming); SEA: Medialink
- Original network: Tokyo MX, BS Asahi, ABC TV, AT-X
- Original run: January 12, 2024 – present
- Episodes: 12
- icon

The Weakest Tamer Began a Journey to Pick Up Trash (Japanese: 最弱テイマーはゴミ拾いの旅を始めました。, Hepburn: Saijaku Teimā wa Gomihiroi no Tabi o Hajimemashita), also known as Saijaku Tamer or Weakest Tamer for short, is a Japanese light novel series written by Honobonoru500 and illustrated by Nama. It began serialization as a web novel on the user-generated novel publishing website Shōsetsuka ni Narō in August 2018. It was later acquired by TO Books, who began publishing it as a light novel in November 2019. It has been collected in seventeen volumes as of July 2026. A manga adaptation illustrated by Tou Fukino began serialization in TO Books' Comic Corona website in February 2020. The manga has been collected in eight volumes as of December 2025. Both the light novel and manga are licensed in North America by Seven Seas Entertainment. An anime television series adaptation by Studio Massket aired from January to March 2024. A second season has been announced.

== Premise ==
Ivy is a girl from a previous life that was cut short who is reborn in another world, where people hold multiple skills and are ranked with stars; however, she only has the no star Tamer skill. She is hated and abused by her once loving family and shunned by the people of her hometown because of it, forcing Ivy to live in the forest after fleeing her now abusive home; however, the local fortune teller takes pity on Ivy, educating and supplying her. After the fortune teller passes away years later, Ivy leaves the area and finds a weak, dying slime; she tames it, naming her new familiar Sora.

As the story progresses, it is revealed the current headman of Ivy's village is shortsighted; enforcing the bigotry that drove Ivy off and ignoring the advice of the fortune teller, leading the village into decline. He brands any villagers who desert as criminals and tries desperately to maintain his reputation, which slowly takes a toll on his sanity.

== Characters ==
Ivy (アイビー, Aibī)
Voiced by: Aina Suzuki (drama CD, anime) (Japanese); Reshel Mae (English)
Ivy is a girl reborn in another world who ran away from her home of Latomi village. She was born as Femicia into a village where people hold multiple skills and are ranked with stars. However, she only has the no-star Tamer skill, which is seen as the root of all evil bent on sending nothing but misfortune to the entire village, and thus she is hated and tormented by both her family-(who used to be supportive and caring towards her before the discovery of her no-Star skills) and the villagers for it, forcing Ivy to flee and live in the forest. The local fortune teller Luba took pity on her in educating and supplying her, using that, as well as her survival skills she learned from her previous life, to run away after Luba died. She would then take on a boy-like appearance and rename herself Ivy to start her own life, as well as to evade capture from the villagers. Unknown to villagers nor the headman who enforced bigotry, no stars meant the skill did not have a limit. Ivy is actually the most capable Tamer of all.
She names her familiars after Japanese words, which are suggested by her past self.
Sora (ソラ)
Voiced by: Mutsumi Tamura (drama CD, anime) (Japanese); Monica Rial (English)
Sora is a slime monster whom Ivy tames when she runs away from home. Sora was found on the verge of death and is one of the few monsters Ivy is able to tame. As the journey progresses, Sora evolves as it can consume more kinds of potions, heal wounds, and speak.
Ciel (シエル, Shieru)
Voiced by: Anna Mugiho (Japanese); Ray Hurd (English)
Ciel is an adandala, a high-ranking beast resembling a black panther, that Ivy tames. Ciel was rescued by Ivy and Sora while on the verge of death, and afterwards they become traveling companions.
Luba (ルーバ, Rūba)
Voiced by: Fumi Hirano (Japanese); Morgan Lauré (English)
Luba is the late fortune teller of Latomi village. Luba was the only villager who sympathized with Ivy over her being a starless tamer as she educated Ivy in survival and provided her with supplies to get away. After she died the villagers placed a bounty on Femicia believing that she inflicts curses on others and that Luba's death was a result of the curse. In truth, the village chief refused to offer medicine to Luba as payback for siding with Femicia, and after her death the village fell into decline since she cared for the crop of zaro fruits, which is the village's main source of income.
Ogto (オグト)
Voiced by: Kenta Miyake (Japanese); Marcus D. Stimac (English)
Ogto is the captain of Latome village's watch guards. He is a caring and energetic person who takes his job seriously, but easily gets carried away to the point where he regularly gets reprimanded by his vice-captain. He takes a liking to Ivy and takes care of her. He holds the belief that star ratings have no bearing into how successful a person will be in life.
Vellivera (ヴェリヴェラ)
Voiced by: Kohsuke Toriumi (Japanese); Aaron Roberts (English)
Vellivera is the vice-captain of Latome village's watch guards. While he usually has a calm demeanor, he will often lose his composure due to Oguto's recklessness.
Seyzelk (セイゼルク, Seizeruku)
Voiced by: Masaki Terasoma (Japanese); Christopher Wehkamp (English)
Seyzelk is an adventurer who leads the Flaming Sword party. Despite his intimidating presence, he has a gentle personality that makes him a respected leader. He possesses skills for physical ability, swordsmanship, and strength.
Lattrua (ラットルア, Rattorua)
Voiced by: Taku Yashiro (Japanese); Alejandro Saab (English)
Lattrua is an adventurer and a member of Flaming Sword. Lattrua treats Ivy like a younger brother. He is put in charge of cooking despite his ineptitude. He possesses skills for fire magic and swordsmanship with the long sword.
Borolda (ボロルダ, Bororuda)
Voiced by: Tomokazu Sugita (Japanese); Kent Williams (English)
Borolda is an adventurer who leads the Lightning King party. He often leads adventurers on monster-slaying quests. He possesses skills in anti-magic attacks and swordsmanship with the long sword.
Rikvelt (リックベルト, Rikkuberuto)
Voiced by: Hiroki Yasumoto (Japanese); William Ofoegbu (English)
Rikvelt is an adventurer and a member of Lightning King. He loves cute things and is affectionate towards Sora. He is great at remembering people's faces. His skills are in fighting, water magic, and one-handed swordsmanship.
Meela (ミーラ, Mīra)
Voiced by: Marina Inoue (Japanese); Corey Pettit (English)
Meela is a tamer and a member of the Green Gale party. She is a two-star tamer who journeys with two slimes she has tamed. While initially being caring towards Ivy, her true motivation is to kidnap her to make money, a plot that Sora found out about.
Tolto (トルト, Toruto) / Malma (マルマ, Maruma)
Voiced by: Shun'ichi Toki (Japanese); Dallas Reid and Bryson Baugus (English)
Tolto and Malma are Meela's older twin brothers with the Green Gale party. They both love sweets. Tolto's skills are in defense and swordsmanship with the longsword, while Malma's skills are two-sword combat and water magic.

== Media ==
=== Light novels ===
Written by Honobonoru500, the series began serialization on the user-generated novel publishing website Shōsetsuka ni Narō on August 9, 2018. It was later acquired by TO Books who began publishing it as a light novel with illustrations by Nama under their TO Bunko light novel imprint on November 9, 2019. It has been collected in seventeen volumes as of July 2026. The light novel is licensed in North America by Seven Seas Entertainment.

No.	Original release date	Original ISBN	English release date	English ISBN
1	November 9, 2019	978-4-86472-876-8	October 6, 2022 (digital); October 25, 2022 (print)	978-1-63858-405-6
2	April 10, 2020	978-4-86472-956-7	December 15, 2022 (digital); January 3, 2023 (print)	978-1-63858-416-2
3	October 10, 2020	978-4-86699-058-3	March 16, 2023 (digital); April 4, 2023 (print)	978-1-63858-706-4
4	April 20, 2021	978-4-86699-199-3	July 27, 2023 (digital); September 5, 2023 (print)	978-1-63858-861-0
5	August 20, 2021	978-4-86699-305-8	November 30, 2023 (digital); December 26, 2023 (print)	979-8-88843-094-1
6	February 19, 2022	978-4-86699-455-0	March 28, 2024 (digital); April 16, 2024 (print)	979-8-88843-442-0
7	June 20, 2022	978-4-86699-549-6	July 11, 2024 (digital); August 13, 2024 (print)	979-8-89160-299-1
8	November 19, 2022	978-4-86699-633-2	November 21, 2024 (digital); December 24, 2024 (print)	979-8-89160-300-4
9	June 10, 2023	978-4-86699-857-2	March 20, 2025 (digital); April 22, 2025 (print)	979-8-89160-936-5
10	January 15, 2024	978-4-86794-043-3	July 10, 2025 (digital); August 26, 2025 (print)	979-8-89373-784-4
11	February 15, 2024	978-4-86794-077-8	October 30, 2025 (digital); December 16, 2025 (print)	979-8-89373-785-1
12	July 20, 2024	978-4-86794-258-1	March 19, 2026 (digital); April 21, 2026 (print)	979-8-89373-786-8
13	January 15, 2025	978-4-86794-423-3	July 30, 2026 (digital); August 25, 2026 (print)	979-8-89863-261-8
14	June 20, 2025	978-4-86794-601-5	November 12, 2026 (digital); December 29, 2026 (print)	979-8-89863-262-5
15	December 15, 2025	978-4-86794-802-6	April 20, 2027	979-8-89863-596-1
16	April 10, 2026	978-4-86794-962-7	—	—
17	July 10, 2026	978-4-86854-051-9	—	—
18	December 15, 2026	978-4-86854-236-0	—	—

=== Manga ===
A manga adaptation illustrated by Tou Fukino began serialization in TO Books' Comic Corona website on February 10, 2020. It has been collected in eight tankōbon volumes as of December 2025. The manga is also licensed in North America by Seven Seas Entertainment.

A spin-off manga illustrated by Amamori, centered around the characters in a school setting, was serialized on the same website from November 21, 2022, to August 19, 2024. The chapters were collected into three tankōbon volumes.

==== Volumes ====
No.	Original release date	Original ISBN	English release date	English ISBN
1	July 15, 2020	978-4-86699-019-4	June 14, 2022	978-1-63858-412-4
Chapters 1–4; Extras; Bonus Short Story: "Sora Is Sometimes Bad with Directions"
2	April 15, 2021	978-4-86699-197-9	November 15, 2022	978-1-63858-732-3
Chapters 5–8; Extras; Bonus Short Story: "Unfortunately, They Got Away!"
3	February 15, 2022	978-4-86699-450-5	May 16, 2023	978-1-68579-542-9
Chapters 9–11; Extras; Bonus Short Story: "Captain Oght and Vice-Captain Velivera"
4	November 15, 2022	978-4-86699-635-6	November 14, 2023	979-8-88843-047-7
Chapters 12–15; Extras; Bonus Short Story: "Gulp"
5	June 15, 2023	978-4-86699-862-6	May 14, 2024	979-8-88843-397-3
Chapters 16–18; Extras; Bonus Short Story: "Huh? Me?"
6	February 15, 2024	978-4-86794-074-7	November 5, 2024	979-8-89160-508-4
Chapters 19–21; Extras; Bonus Short Story: "A Certain Vigilance Corps Member's POV"
7	January 15, 2025	978-4-86794-413-4	September 30, 2025	979-8-89373-269-6
Chapters 22–25; Extras; Bonus Short Story: "See You Again"
8	December 15, 2025	978-4-86794-787-6	September 1, 2026	979-8-89863-263-2
Chapters 26–29; Extras; Bonus Short Story: "A Bewitching Beauty?"
9	December 15, 2026	978-4-86854-219-3	—	—

==== Spin-off ====
No.	Release date	ISBN
1	June 15, 2023	978-4-86699-863-3
2	January 15, 2024	978-4-86794-051-8
3	September 14, 2024	978-4-86794-310-6

=== Anime ===
An anime television series adaptation was announced in November 2022. It is produced by Studio Massket and directed by Naoki Horiuchi, with Shigeyasu Yamauchi serving as chief director, Katsuhiko Takayama writing the scripts, Feng Cheng Hu and Yuki Ikeda designing the characters, and Kujira Yumemi composing the music. The series aired from January 12 to March 29, 2024, on Tokyo MX and other networks. The opening theme song is "Hate no Nai Tabi" (果てのない旅; lit. 'An Endless Journey') performed by Aina Suzuki, and the ending theme song is "Because" performed by Tei. Crunchyroll is streaming the series. Medialink has licensed the series in Southeast Asia and Oceania (except Australia and New Zealand) and streaming it on the Ani-One Asia YouTube channel.

A second season was announced in December 2025.

==== Episodes ====
No.	Title (Note: English translated titles are taken from Crunchyroll.)	Directed by (Note: Production staff information is taken from the ending credits of each episode.)	Chief animation directed by	Original release date
1	"On a Journey Alone"; Transliteration: "Hitori no Tabi e" (Japanese: ひとりの旅へ)	Shigeyasu Yamauchi	Li Shaolei	January 12, 2024
Femicia, an 8-year-old tamer who is deemed an unwanted child by her family and fellow villagers for being starless, sneaks out of Latomi village during the night and grabs her resources that were given to her by the village's fortune teller. The next day, she scavenges through a dump site for supplies that includes a map and old potions. Overhearing a pair of adventurers sent by the village to look for Femicia, she learns that she has a bounty on her head, she gets away and falls down a cliff. Along the way, she remembers pieces of her past life, and heeding the advice of her past life, she takes on a boyish appearance and a new name, Ivy. Ivy befriends a disintegrating slime, the weakest monster in existence and the only monster she can tame, and shares her life struggles with it. The next morning, Ivy sets out for the royal capital and tames the slime, naming it Sora.
2	"To Latoto Village"; Transliteration: "Ratoto Mura e" (Japanese: ラトト村へ)	Directed by : Naoki Horiuchi; Storyboarded by : Hidetoshi Yoshida	Hufeng Cheng	January 19, 2024
Using the survival skills learned from her past life, Ivy hunts field mice for food, and then evades a pack of giant ants by climbing a tree. Ivy sets off for the town of Otolwa, but needing more potions she stops at a nearby village. Along the way, she sees wanted posters for Femicia with a 500 dal reward, realizing that she has become a fugitive. Ivy arrives at Latoto village where she sells the supply of meat she got from hunting to the butcher for 100 dal. Ivy spends some of it buying bread from the bakery. The next day, Ivy scavenges through another dump site to get some potions to feed to Sora. After hunting more field mice, she sells her new batch for 250 dal and buys more bread. While eating, she reflects on how she would love to live in Latoto. The next day, the adventurers Ivy spotted at the dump site near Latomi arrive in Latoto, and seeing wanted posters all over town that Ivy flees the village before restocking on potions. Continuing on the journey, Ivy drops by a river with fruit trees to stock up on food and water, but she is attacked by a tree monster that has killed two adventurers. Ivy runs away but gets a nasty wound on her left wrist and having no potions, she collapses with Sora covering it.
3	"To Those Remembered Days"; Transliteration: "Tsuioku no Hi e" (Japanese: 追憶の日へ)	Directed by : Masahito Otani; Storyboarded by : Hikaru Takeuchi	Yuki Ikeda & Hufeng Cheng	January 26, 2024
While unconscious, Ivy recalls her upbringing at Latomi. She had a loving family and loved animals that made her want to become a tamer. But when it came time for her appraisal, she was discovered to be a starless tamer, and in light of this news, her family and fellow villagers turned her into an outcast. Femicia ran away and ran into the village's fortune teller Luba, who sympathized with her. She learned her survival skills through Luba, and she receives a book filled with knowledge about the world, as well as a magical bag that can store items in another dimension using magic from Luba. Sometime later, Luba died and believing that Femicia laid a curse on Luba that killed her, the village leader orders a manhunt to ensure that she is dead. After secretly hearing about the manhunt, Femicia grabbed her stuff that Luba gave her and fled the village. Ivy wakes up with her arm healed thanks to Sora's regenerative powers, and Sora can now make squealing noises.
4	"Towards an Unexpected Situation"; Transliteration: "Omowanu Jitai e" (Japanese: 思わぬ事態へ)	Kenichi Higaki	Li Shaolei	February 2, 2024
Running low on potions, Ivy visits a dump site and learns that Sora can now consume red potions after previously consuming only blue potions. With Sora consuming potions at an unsustainable rate that Ivy has Sora fall asleep by telling a bedtime story. The next day, Sora sets a trap to capture a field mouse, but ends up capturing a snake instead. Shortly afterward, Ivy spots a merchant group brutally killed. Ivy arrives at Latom village where she reports the incident to the town hall, and adventurers are dispatched to deal with the culprits. Afterwards, she sells the snake to an apothecary, earning three gidal (worth 3,000 dal total). Ivy goes to another dump site where she finds several discarded magic bags and tries to find a way to utilize them to increase her storage. One of the adventurers returns to inform Ivy that thanks to her tip, the adventurers are dealing with the ogres and the ogre king who attacked the merchants. Ivy collects her tip reward from the town hall of five gidal for info on the deceased people and two ladal (worth 20 gidal or 20,000 dal total) for info on high-ranked monsters. That night, Ivy decides to stay in Latom until the hunt is over and plans to visit Latome next.
5	"To Latome Village"; Transliteration: "Ratome Mura e" (Japanese: ラトメ村へ)	Ken Sanuma	Yūki Morikawa & Takuya Imakado	February 9, 2024
On her way to Latome, Ivy and Sora spot a critically-wounded adandala, a high-level black panther-like beast that adventurers are advised to avoid fighting at all costs. Sora heals its wounds and the adandala befriends Ivy, who she names Ciel. As Ivy approaches Latome, Ciel goes off and hides in the forest, and then she sees a man trying to enter Latome get treated roughly by the captain of the village watch guards, Ogto, after he is caught trying to smuggle illegal booze into town. Scared by Ogto's intimidating presence after he calls her out, Ivy tells him that she is from Latomi, with Ogto responding with news that her hometown has recently fallen on hard times, as well as suggesting that she becomes an adventurer. Ivy enters the village and sees the butcher, who warns her about the nonoshi, a giant boar-like beast, lurking around town. With sleeping in the forest too dangerous, Ivy settles on sleeping at a campground inside the village for adventurers. Ivy decides to buy a tent with the money she earned in Latom. She runs into Ogto and his vice-captain Vellivera, who take her to Lagg's shop to buy a used tent for five gidal. Ivy pitches her new tent, and afterwards a party led by the tent's previous owner Joya harasses Ivy, accusing her of stealing it from him. A watch guard comes to Ivy's aid and calls on his fellow guards to apprehend Joya's party knowing that Ivy legitimately bought the tent. As an apology, the guard gives Ivy a special potion that Sora wants to consume, but Ivy does not allow it to.
6	"To Travel Beyond Imagination"; Transliteration: "Omoi Kanata e" (Japanese: 想い彼方へ)	Penny Hung	Yuki Ikeda & Hufeng Cheng	February 16, 2024
Ivy starts the day by going hunting with Ciel catching nine game rabbits, which she sells to the butcher for 855 dal. Afterwards, Ivy comes across a peddler selling zaro fruits, which only grows in Latomi and is the village's main source of income. The peddler explains the troubles going on in Latomi as Luba used her fortune telling talent to take care of the zaro crop, but after her death attempts to cultivate it failed. She is also told that the village chief offered no treatment to Luba when she fell ill as retaliation for helping Femicia. That night, Ivy remembers what Luba told her about finding people she can trust, and how the people at Latome are nice. The next day, Ivy is ambushed by two members of Joya's party, but they are defeated by Ciel. Afterwards, Ogto tells Ivy that all four members of Joya's party are wanted criminals and the two who attacked her are murderers who have evaded capture due to their sprinter skill, and for helping the guards apprehend the two murderers that Ivy is given a reward of two ladal and three gidal (23,000 dal total). Ogto takes Ivy to the trade guild to open a bank account to store her money, and then treats her to a dinner of nonoshi skewers. Ogto asks Ivy about her skill revealing that she is a tamer, but not telling him that she is starless as Ogto explains that even those with the lowest ranking can find success. The next day, Ivy leaves Latome for the town next to the royal capital with Ogto and Vellivera sending her off. After Ivy leaves, Vellivera tells Ogto that Ivy is likely that missing person unaccounted for, but despite knowing this the guards view her as a wounded child in need of help.
7	"On the Path to Adventure"; Transliteration: "Bōken no Michi e" (Japanese: 冒険の道へ)	Directed by : Studio Massket; Storyboarded by : Masahiko Ōkura	Li Shaolei	February 23, 2024
Ivy and Sora set out for Otolwa and meet up with Ciel and camp out together. The next day, Ivy spots a mysterious figure that gives her chills before it quickly vanishes. Ivy travels through a canyon and gets attacked by ogres, causing her to get separated from Ciel. While fleeing the ogres, Ivy gets caught in one of the traps set out by a party of adventurers called the Blazing Sword consisting of the leader Seyzelk, the blind warrior Nouga, the archer Shifale, and the fire user Lattrua, while the tamer Meela from the Green Gale party is with them. Ivy travels with the Blazing Sword to a campsite for adventurers near Otolwa, and before entering Ivy instructs Ciel to hide. Ivy enters the campsite and helps Lattrua make dinner for the party, which is well-received. Lattrua shows off his fire skill to make fireworks. Using experiences from her past life Ivy uses metals that Meela gathered to make colorful fireworks and put on a show for the campsite. After dinner, the party cleans the dishes and head out to their tents to go to sleep. In the Blazing Sword's tent, the party members talk about the rough shape Ivy is in seeing that she has been traveling alone and realizes that Ivy is trying to be as useful as she can.
8	"To a Dangerous Town"; Transliteration: "Kiken'na Machi e" (Japanese: 危険な町へ)	Directed by : Naoki Horiuchi; Storyboarded by : Hidetoshi Yoshida	Hufeng Cheng & Li Shaolei	March 1, 2024
As Ivy gather discarded potions from the campground's dump site, she is approached by Meela, asking her about disintegrating slimes that Sora is. Her reply about their value triggers the same chills Ivy felt earlier. That night, Ivy cooks dinner and is introduced to the rest of Green Gale, Meela's older twin brothers Tolto and Malma. After Green Gale leaves, the party Lightning King led by Borolda arrives. Inside the tent, Ivy feels the same chills again, which quickly fades when it is Lattrua approaching her. Noticing that Sora reacts strongly to malicious people that Ivy asks about the people she met, getting that reaction when asking about Meela. The next day, Ivy is escorted to Otolwa by Blazing Sword, meeting up with Lightning King again. Seyzelk explains to Ivy that Otolwa is a dangerous town where a criminal organization is abducting people to sell to slavery and have eluded law enforcement, and a lone child is an easy target. Behind a sound-blocking barrier, Ivy explains to the parties about the chills she felt, and that Meela has a dark side but is reluctant to show Sora to prove her accusation. The next morning, the parties gather and tell Ivy that her suspicion is justified after Lightning King member Rikvelt followed Meela around that night, noticing that Green Gale was having a conversation with an out-of-town merchant behind a sound-blocking barrier. Lattrua tells everybody that Ivy's effort she put into cooking meals is why Blazing Sword trusts her, and having gained the trust of the parties, Ivy shows Sora to them, with Blazing Sword and Lightning King promising to keep Sora a secret.
9	"Toward a Confrontation with the Organization"; Transliteration: "Soshiki to no Taiketsu e" (Japanese: 組織との対決へ)	Ken Sanuma	Yūki Morikawa, Yuki Ikeda & Takuya Imakado	March 8, 2024
Ivy explains Sora's ability with Blazing Sword and Lightning King, and after telling various truths and lies, they believe her. Ivy and the two parties discuss the failed raid and Green Gale's connection behind a sound-blocking barrier, concluding that a noble leaked the information. Ivy, Seyzelk, Lattrua, and Borolda meet the town's guild master Rogleef, along with the captain of the town's watchmen Burksby and the vice-captain Aggrop, with Ivy hiding Sora in her bag and Borolda using a piece of Sora to tell who can be trusted. Knowing that Rogleef, Burksby, and Aggrop can be trusted, Borolda agrees to find the traitors among the town's watchmen. Burksby and Aggrop brings the group over to the organization's deserted base after Rogleef gave the order to assemble all the town's watchmen there, where and out of the town's 157 watchmen, 38 are traitors including Malgajula. Count Faltoria and Lord Foronda drop by, with Sora reacting to Faltoria. Knowing that Faltoria is part of the organization, the group decides to search the room that Malgajula was guarding, where they find a secret room where lots of money and documents of the organization's trade deals are stashed away. Everybody returns to camp, and Ivy helps Lattrua out with laundry using a magical water bucket. Meela approaches Ivy and Lattrua wanting to take them out to have sweets, but when her brothers appear, Ivy gets the impression that she's trying to kidnap her.
10	"Into the Vortex of the Incidents"; Transliteration: "Jiken no Kachū e" (Japanese: 事件の渦中へ)	Directed by : Michita Shiraishi; Storyboarded by : Hiroshi Mita	Hufeng Cheng & Li Shaolei	March 15, 2024
Lattrua beats Meela in a game of rock paper scissors, and Lattrua chooses the place the five go out for sweets. While eating, Ivy tells Meela that she can make great use of her slimes she tamed. Afterwards, Lattrua explains that he chose that place to keep Green Gale in check while eating, and that Otolwa used to be peaceful until recently. That night, Ivy and the two parties discuss Green Gale's role, arriving at the belief that Green Gale is just a pawn for the organization. Using advice from her past life, Ivy comes up with a plan to use herself as a decoy for Green Gale and pass on false information to the organization to capture them, as well as use a sleep sphere to put both sides to sleep, but the plan is met with skepticism. However, Ivy convinces the parties to act while the organization is unaware of Sora. The next day, Rogleef assembles the adventurers to the organization's base to greet Ivy so that she can figure out through Sora who among them are traitors, while Shifale asks Burksby to assemble a special unit to deal with a monster lair that was apparently discovered in the forest, a task handled by Aggrop. After the greetings, Meela expresses her gratitude for what Ivy said at the sweets place. Meanwhile, Shifale tells Burksby about the plan to use the sleep sphere, while Nouga gives Burksby a special item designed to be used against powerful monsters to use against the enemy. Later, Aggrop has the special unit assembled, while Borolda and Rikvelt leads a group of adventurers to deal with the monsters with both groups consisting of mostly traitors in order to steer them away from town during the operation. Ivy and Lattrua go out for sweets with Green Gale at Meela's preferred place, which is all part of Ivy's plan.
11	"Into Battle"; Transliteration: "Tatakai e" (Japanese: 戦へ)	Directed by : Masahito Otani; Storyboarded by : Hidetoshi Yoshida	Yūki Morikawa, Yuki Ikeda & Takuya Imakado	March 22, 2024
At the sweets place, Ivy and Lattrua pretend to fall into Green Gale's trap knowing that the owner Hagg is a traitor. They talk about a special mission while Hagg prepares the sweets and after Hagg leaves, Lattrua outs the truth about Green Gale working for the organization. Tolto and Malma fight Lattrua, but Meela decides to help Lattrua by sending her tamed slimes to stop her brothers. Meanwhile, Faltoria arrives at the organization's base to order his watchmen to empty the secret room. Upon entering the secret room, the sleep sphere activates, putting everybody at the base to sleep. Outside of town, Burksby leads the special unit far enough away from town, and then uses the special item, a large net imbued with strength-sapping magic, to round up the traitors among the watchmen, while Borolda and his allies deal with the traitors among the adventurers. That evening, the traitors are rounded up and brought to the base. The town's civilians prepare to start a riot, but Burksby quells the situation by explaining that the traitors will be punished through slave labor, a punishment fitting for their crimes, but ask the civilians to be patient and let the legal process play out. Afterwards, Seyzelk orders the people found near the base to gather and get checked by Sora to determine who served as enemy lookouts.
12	"On a Journey, the Three of Us"; Transliteration: "San'nin no Tabi e" (Japanese: 三人の旅へ)	Directed by : Ken Sanuma & Naoki Horiuchi; Storyboarded by : Ken Sanuma & Meng Sun	Yūki Morikawa, Yuki Ikeda, Takuya Imakado & Hufeng Cheng	March 29, 2024
A few days later, the investigation wraps up with Burksby and Aggrop explaining the extent of the organization's crime network to Ivy and presents a reward of 150 ladal for her assistance. Afterwards, Ivy goes hunting with Ciel and catches several rabbits and field mice. That night, Rogleef throws a party to celebrate the apprehension of the organization. Rogleef and his comrades explain that Faltoria confessed to the crimes, while Green Gale's role was minimal that likely means leniency for Meela. Borolda tells Ivy that he had to reveal Sora to Rogleef in order to catch the traitors. Ivy then shows Sora to everybody, with Rogleef taking note of its translucence that makes this slime rare. Rogleef asks Ivy if she is willing to consider living in Otolwa, and recalling Luba's words about how people are more important to place, Ivy reveals her secret about her starless tamer skill to everybody. After hearing Ivy's story, everybody praises her strength and believes that stars are totally meaningless, which convinces Ivy to continue her journey. The next day, Ivy says goodbye to the adventurers and watchmen as she leaves Otolwa having been given upgraded magic bags as gifts. As they see her leave, Ciel rejoins her with Shifale commenting about how she is stronger than those who have stars that go unused. In the epilogue, the story about how Sora met Ivy is told.
