= Chronicles of an Aristocrat Reborn in Another World =

Japanese light novel series

- First light novel volume cover

転生貴族の異世界冒険録 (Tensei Kizoku no Isekai Bōken Roku)
- Genre: Fantasy comedy, isekai
- Novel series
- Written by: Yashu
- Published by: Shōsetsuka ni Narō
- Original run: October 28, 2016 – present
- Light novel
- Written by: Yashu
- Illustrated by: Mo
- Published by: Hifumi Shobō
- English publisher: NA: Seven Seas Entertainment
- Imprint: Saga Forest
- Original run: June 15, 2017 – present
- Volumes: 6
- Manga
- Written by: Yashu
- Illustrated by: Nini
- Published by: Mag Garden
- English publisher: NA: Seven Seas Entertainment
- Magazine: Mag Comi
- Original run: March 25, 2018 – present
- Volumes: 15
- Anime television series

The Aristocrat's Otherworldly Adventure: Serving Gods Who Go Too Far
- Directed by: Mitsutaka Noshitani (chief); Noriyuki Nakamura
- Produced by: Ushio Endou; Yuuko Esaka; Mao Higashi; Hikaru Honda; Yuuki Satou; Yuuki Yamaoka; Nobuaki Yoneyama; Hajime Ryuuzaki
- Written by: Natsuko Takahashi
- Music by: Michiru
- Studio: EMT Squared; Magic Bus
- Licensed by: Crunchyroll
- Original network: Tokyo MX, BS11
- Original run: April 3, 2023 – June 19, 2023
- Episodes: 12
- icon

Chronicles of an Aristocrat Reborn in Another World (Japanese: 転生貴族の異世界冒険録, Hepburn: Tensei Kizoku no Isekai Bōken Roku) is a Japanese light novel series written by Yashu. The series originated on the Shōsetsuka ni Narō website in October 2016, before being published in print with illustrations by Mo by Hifumi Shobō beginning in June 2017 under their Saga Forest imprint. As of December 2019, six volumes have been released. A manga adaptation, illustrated by Nini, began serialization on Mag Garden's Mag Comi manga website in March 2018. As of May 2026, the manga's individual chapters have been collected into fifteen volumes. An anime television series adaptation by EMT Squared and Magic Bus aired from April to June 2023.

== Plot ==
A Japanese teenager is killed by a thug and reincarnates in an alternate, fantasy-like world as Cain Von Silford, the third son of the noble Von Silford family thanks to the intervention of the seven gods residing there. Accepting the task from the gods of helping improve their world with the knowledge from his past life, Cain is appointed as their Apostle and receives powerful blessings from them, unaware that his true mission is to protect the world from a forgotten, evil deity who is about to awaken. After defeating the first form of the god, he goes on to live his life. However, he is given a lot of trouble from the Duke/Marquis Corgino (Duke in manga, Marquis in anime).

== Characters ==
Cain von Silford (カイン・フォン・シルフォード, Kain fon Shirufōdo)
Voiced by: Yoshino Nanjō (Japanese); Trina Nishimura (English)
A Japanese teenager named Shiinya Kazuya who was killed by a thug and reincarnated in another world as the son of a lord in the Esfort Kingdom. Blessed with the power of all 7 gods, Cain quickly grows far stronger than any other human, using the power at his disposal to protect the innocents and punish evildoers, which soon brings the attention of the king, who arranges him to be engaged with his daughter, Telestia and her close friend Silk; this goes against Cain's wishes, as he loathes noble etiquette, but he soon warms up to them. His actions sometimes do more harm than good, leading him to be constantly lectured by others. Through the course of the series, Cain grows stronger while earning titles and achievements, with other girls also becoming engaged with him (five so far), as he prepares himself to fight an evil god who is about to awake after being sealed away centuries ago.
According to the gods, Cain's poor judgement got him killed for nothing; his killer would have been stopped before hurting anyone, but Cain needlessly shielded others, which earned him the gods' blessings.
Telestia Terra Esfort (テレスティア・テラ・エスフォート, Teresutia Tera Esfuuto)
Voiced by: Manaka Iwami (Japanese); Leah Clark (English)
The third princess of the Kingdom. Fell in love with Cain after he saved her and Silk. She plans to help run Cain's territory; studying to do so, as Cain has little interest. She and Silk are Cain's first two fiancées.
Silk von Santana (シルク・フォン・サンタナ, Shiruku fon santana)
Voiced by: Aya Uchida (Japanese); Kate Oxley (English)
Daughter of Duke Santana. Fell in love with Cain after he saved her and Telestia. She plans to help with finances on Cain's territory; which would help Cain market his magic tool research. She and Telestia are Cain's first two fiancées.
Tifana von Ribelt (ティファーナ, Tifāna)
Voiced by: Sora Tokui (Japanese); Kasi Hollowell (English)
Tifana is an elf knight and daughter of a duke from the northern regions of the kingdom. She meets Cain and becomes interested in him after he defeats her in a mock battle, later becoming his third fianceé. She is a bullheaded smotherer, whom constantly bothers Cain.
Hinata Lyra Marineford
Hinata is the saint of the Marineford religion and later becomes Cain Von Silford's fourth fiancée after he foiled the assassination attempts arranged by the corrupted Pope of her homeland.
Liltana von Visus
Liltana is the sixth Imperial princess of the Visus Empire and fell for Cain Von Silford years ago on a visit to the Esfort territory of Lamesta.
Lisabeth von Benestos
Lisabeth is the Imperial princess of the Benestos Demon Empire and later becomes Cain Von Silford's fifth fiancée after falling for him for saving her.
Reine von Silford (レイネ・フォン・シルフォード, Reine fon shirufōdo)
Voiced by: Miharu Hanai (Japanese); Kristen McGuire (English)
Cain's older sister who dotes on him. Reine noticed Cain was interested in learning about the outside world as a toddler, so she took to educating him about the kingdom.
Silvia (シルビア, Shirubia)
Voiced by: Natsu Yorita (Japanese); Natalie Rose (English)
A maid who works for the Silford Family and eventually for Cain when he becomes a baron. Silvia is rarely without a smile and is always lending useful advice to Cain about nobility.
Garm von Silford (ガルム, Garumu)
Voiced by: Kohsuke Toriumi (Japanese); Jim Foronda (English)
Cain and Reine's father. He holds the noble rank of Margrave.
Sarah von Silford (サラ・フォン・シルフォード, Sara fon Shirufōdo)
Voiced by: Aki Toyosaki (Japanese); Anastasia Muñoz (English)
Cain and Reine's mother and Garm's second wife. She is the eldest daughter of Viscount Santos von Galetta Danlof.
Rex Terra Esfort (レックス・テラ・エスフォート, Rekkusu Tera Esfuuto)
Voiced by: Hidenari Ugaki (Japanese); Cris George (English)
The Kingdom of Esfort's king and the father of Telestia. He becomes aware Cain is an apostle, but is not above pressuring him into doing things; since Cain is easily intimated by his imposing figure and status. Cain doesn't like being around Rex because he shouts over everything.
Eric von Santana (エリック・フォン・サンタナ, Erikku fon santana)
Voiced by: Tarusuke Shingaki (Japanese); Josh Bangle (English)
The Duke and Silk's father. He is constantly amused by the absurdities Cain pulls off.
Milly (ミリィ, Miri)
Voiced by: Saori Ōnishi (Japanese); Krystal LaPorte (English)
A B-rank swordsman who was hired to be Cain's tutor along with Nina.
Nina (ニーナ, Nīna)
Voiced by: Hibiku Yamamura (Japanese); Kate Bristol (English)
A B-rank elf magician who was hired to be Cain's tutor along with Milly. She holds aspirations of becoming Cain's mistress; because of his status and magical power.
Claude (クロード, Kurōdo)
Voiced by: Chiaki Kobayashi (Japanese); Ian Sinclair (English)
An A-Rank Swordsman who is in a party with his wife Lina, called Ice Flame. He is Milly's elder brother.
Lina (リナ, Rina)
Voiced by: Maaya Uchida (Japanese); Morgan Garrett (English)
An A-Rank magician who is in a party called Ice Flame with her husband Claude. She dislikes her husband's sarcasm and drinking habits, but also greatly admires Cain.
Eden von Ribelt
Voiced by: Masaya Matsukaze (Japanese); Jessie James Grelle (English)
The Guild Master of the Gracia Adventurers Guild as well as Tifana von Ribelt's older brother.
Seth van Dalstein
Voiced by: Tomoaki Maeno (Japanese); Bradley Gareth (English)
A Demon Lord from the Benestos Demon Empire. He was summoned by Cain and decided to become contracted to him, due his status as an apostle. It was an accident in Cain's part, as he didn't know his own summons could work that way.
Lefane von Dalstein
Voiced by: Mikako Komatsu (Japanese); Mallorie Rodak (English)
The wife of the Demon Lord Seth van Dalstein.
Maria von Silford
Garm's first wife and Cain's step-mother.
Jin von Silford
Voiced by: Kengo Takanashi (Japanese); David Matranga (English)
Cain's eldest half-brother.
Alec von Silford
Voiced by: Shun Horie (Japanese); Derick Snow (English)
Cain's older half-brother.
Cross
Voiced by: Junichi Yanagita (Japanese); Jason Bunch (English)
A thug-like C rank adventurer. He antagonizes Milly, Nina, and Cain during their first meeting, but soon fears Cain upon seeing how powerful he is.
Daim von Ghazat;
Voiced by: Rikuya Yasuda (Japanese); Eric Vale (English)
The vice captain of Esfort's troops. It's his fault Tifana even met Cain; due to dragging him to help with the knights training.
Magna von Terrahart
Voiced by: Naomi Kusumi (Japanese); Brian Mathis (English)
The prime minister of Esfort.
Marquis Corgino
Voiced by: Fukushi Ochiai
One of the nobles. He is an overweight buffoon who had shady dealings that are constant shut down by Cain. His arrogance resulted in him getting on Rex's bad side and demoted. He becomes Aaron's apostle briefly before Cain kills him
Habit Corgino
Voiced by: Sachiko Kojima (Japanese); Brittney Karbowski (English)
Marquis Corgino's spoiled son who has his own issues towards Cain, but soon fears him after learning that he's a baron.
Parma
Voiced by: Yūko Ōnou (Japanese); Meg McClain (English)
A cat-girl who is a friend of Cain's. She apprentices for her uncle.
Rudy
Voiced by: Ayaka Suwa (Japanese); Hannah Alyea (English)
A dog-girl who serves as a guild secretary.
Tamanis
Voiced by: Wataru Hatano
Parma's uncle, who owns a shop. Cain has him market the games he recreates.
Colan
Voiced by: Kouhei Yanagi (Japanese); Matt Shipman (English)
A butler who works at Cain's mansion in the capital.
Yuuya Terra Hirasawa Esfort
Voiced by: Ryōta Ōsaka (Japanese); Dalton Walker (English)
Esfort's first king and founder. He is also a person reincarnated from Japan, just like Cain and his parents. He also became a God of Creation who created his own world called Fabneil.
Layson von Ribelt
A duke as well as Eden, Tifana and Raden's father. He's just as much a muscle head as his daughter.
Tina von Ribelt
She is married to Layson as well as Eden, Tifana and Raden's mother.
Letia
Voiced by: Yuuki Kuwahara (Japanese); Brittany Lauda (English)
The secretary of the Gracia Adventures Guild.
Cedric
Voiced by: Kentarou Itou (Japanese); Alex Hom (English)
The vice guild master of the Gracia Adventures Guild. He is stern and somewhat delusional, but is nevertheless loyal to his boss. He at first antagonizes Cain due to his age, but soon begins respecting him more after learning that he is a baron.
Elka von Portlay
Voiced by: Youko Hikasa
An instructor at the Royal Academy.
Haku
Voiced by: Kaede Yuasa
A Fenrir puppy that is saved and tamed by Cain.
Derain
Voiced by: Kenji Hamada
A man who appears to be an elf and is old friends with Yuuya from before Yuuya transcended to godhood, who is tasked by Yuuya to train Cain. He is actually a dragon who has taken human form and is known as a 'Dragon God'. He is the father of Gin.
Ruri
Voiced by: Mai Nakahara (Japanese); Amanda Tavares (English)
Derain's wife. She is a kind woman. She is actually a dragon who has taken human form. She is the mother of Gin.
Gin
Voiced by: Yūko Ōno
A silver divine dragon that is the son of Derain and Ruri, who is entrusted to Cain to broaden Gin's experiences.
Seiya and Megumi Shiina
Seiya: Voiced by: Tooru Akiyoshi
Megumi: Voiced by: Sayuri Yahagi
Cain's parents, who were reincarnated in the new world after dying in a car crash. They were killed by Aaron after sealing him away.
Sabinos
Voiced by: Junji Majima (Japanese); Aaron Roberts (English)
Tamanis' brother and Parma's father.
Gratt
Voiced by: Atsushi Tamaru
An instructor at Royal Academy.
Dalmatia
Voiced by: Jouji Nakata (Japanese); Mark Stoddard (English)
Seth's butler and the former Heavenly King. Despite his name being one letter off from a dog breed, he is a master of insects. Seth currently works for Cain in his territory.
Four Heavenly Kings
Seth's followers.

=== Gods/Goddesses ===
A pantheon in charge of this world. Rather than deal with the issue of the evil god themselves, they make the poor judgement of creating demigods from apostles; said apostles eventually become full gods, putting the issue back at square one.

Zenom (ゼノム, Zenomu)
Voiced by: Tomomichi Nishimura (Japanese); Phil Parsons (English)
God of Creation.
Rime (ライム, Raimu)
Voiced by: Sakura Nakamura (Japanese); Molly Zhang (English)
Goddess of Death and Rebirth.
Reno (レノ)
Voiced by: Riho Sugiyama (Japanese); Corey Pettit (English)
Goddess of Magic.
Sarnos (サーノス, Sānosu)
Voiced by: Ikuto Kanemasa (Japanese); Mathew David Rudd (English)
God of War.
Grim (グリム, Gurimu)
Voiced by: Ryo Yamata (Japanese); Mac McGee (English)
God of Technology.
Panam (パナム, Panamu)
Voiced by: Masayuki Fujibuchi (Japanese); Justin Cook (English)
God of Commerce. All contracts must have a copy offered to Panam; he punishes anyone illegally copies merchandise.
Bela (ベラ, Bera)
Voiced by: Wakana Kuramochi (Japanese); Elizabeth Evans (English)
Goddess of Earth.
Aaron (アーロン, Āron)
Voiced by: Marina Inoue (Japanese); Justin Briner (English)
Former God of Entertainment. Now an evil god who was sealed away for causing much needless suffering in the mortal world for his own amusement. Originally sealed away, he is slowly regaining his strength, to seek revenge against the gods and continue his death games on the mortals, which makes him Cain's arch-nemesis. He is also responsible for the death of Cain's Earth parents, having been summoned to the same world, but killed while sealing away the evil god. (Manga/Anime)→After an altercation where Cain fought a dragon possessed by Aaron, Aaron's plans were temporarily put on hold.

== Media ==
=== Light novel ===
Written by Yashu, the series began publication on the novel posting website Shōsetsuka ni Narō on October 28, 2016. The series was later acquired by Hifumi Shobō, who began publishing the series with illustrations by Mo on June 15, 2017, under their Saga Forest imprint. As of December 2019, six volumes have been released.

In February 2025, Seven Seas Entertainment announced that they licensed the light novels for English publication.

==== Volumes ====
No.	Original release date	Original ISBN	English release date	English ISBN
1	June 15, 2017	978-4-89-199434-1	December 4, 2025 (digital); January 6, 2026 (print)	979-8-89561-567-6
2	November 15, 2017	978-4-89-199465-5	April 9, 2026 (digital); May 12, 2026 (print)	979-8-89561-568-3
3	May 15, 2018	978-4-89-199501-0	September 15, 2026 (print)	979-8-89561-569-0
4	November 15, 2018	978-4-89-199526-3	January 17, 2027 (print)	979-8-89561-570-6
5	May 15, 2019	978-4-89-199562-1	—	—
6	December 15, 2019	978-4-89-199608-6	—	—

=== Manga ===
A manga adaptation, illustrated by Nini, began serialization on Mag Garden's Mag Comi website on March 25, 2018. As of May 2026, the manga's individual chapters have been collected into fifteen tankōbon volumes.

In December 2020, Seven Seas Entertainment announced that they licensed the manga adaptation for English publication.

==== Volumes ====
No.	Original release date	Original ISBN	English release date	English ISBN
1	November 15, 2018	978-4-80-000805-3	August 10, 2021	978-1-64-827553-1
2	May 31, 2019	978-4-80-000860-2	November 2, 2021	978-1-64-827562-3
3	December 13, 2019	978-4-80-000924-1	January 4, 2022	978-1-64-827566-1
4	May 14, 2020	978-4-80-000971-5	March 29, 2022	978-1-64-827576-0
5	November 13, 2020	978-4-80-001033-9	June 21, 2022	978-1-63-858290-8
6	May 14, 2021	978-4-80-001091-9	April 11, 2023	978-1-63-858656-2
7	December 14, 2021	978-4-80-001157-2	August 8, 2023	978-1-63-858888-7
8	May 13, 2022	978-4-80-001214-2	December 26, 2023	978-1-68-579551-1
9	December 14, 2022	978-4-80-001279-1	April 9, 2024	979-8-88-843342-3
10	May 12, 2023	978-4-80-001333-0	August 6, 2024	979-8-89-160038-6
11	January 13, 2024	978-4-80-001416-0	December 24, 2024	979-8-89-160626-5
12	August 9, 2024	978-4-80-001483-2	May 20, 2025	979-8-89-373298-6
13	March 14, 2025	978-4-80-001561-7	November 11, 2025	979-8-89561-663-5
14	October 14, 2025	978-4-80-001649-2	June 30, 2026	979-8-89765-326-3
15	May 14, 2026	978-4-80-001748-2	—	—

=== Anime ===
An anime television series adaptation, titled The Aristocrat's Otherworldly Adventure: Serving Gods Who Go Too Far, was announced on August 5, 2022. It was produced by EMT Squared and Magic Bus and directed by Noriyuki Nakamura with Mitsutaka Noshitani as chief director, Natsuko Takahashi in charge of series composition, Eri Tokugawa designing the characters, and Michiru composing the music. The series aired from April 3 to June 19, 2023, on Tokyo MX and BS11. The opening theme song is "Preview" performed by Aya Uchida, while the ending theme song is "Nanairo no E no Gu de" (七色の絵の具で) performed by 7Land. Crunchyroll streamed the series outside of Asia.

==== Episodes ====
No.	Title	Directed by (Note: Information is taken from the ending credits of each episode.)	Written by	Storyboarded by	Original release date
1	"I Reincarnated"; Transliteration: "Tensei Shichaimashita" (Japanese: 転生しちゃいました)	Noriyuki Nakamura	Saeka Fujimoto	Noriyuki Nakamura	April 3, 2023
Shiinya Kazuya, a Japanese teenager, is killed saving two girls and finds himself reincarnated in another world as Cain von Silford, the 3 year old son of a noble family with his memories intact. While struggling to understand and adjust to his new surroundings, he meets his father Garm, mother Sarah, maid Silvia, and older sister Reine. He also meets Garm's first wife, Maria, and much older half-brothers, Djinn and Alec. Due to his sudden increase in intelligence brought on by his previous memories, he is allowed to study and begins using magic in secret. Reine tutors him on many subjects. Two years later, Cain is ready for baptism and learns there are 7 Gods in the Marineford Faith. During his baptism, all 7 Gods inform him since he died performing a good deed, he will receive blessings from all of them. Cain realizes with their blessings, he has instantly become the strongest, smartest, most skilled human alive. His family are thrilled, but worried that nations may see him as a threat, so Cain keeps his powers hidden. At his baptism party, Cain decides to become an adventurer so he can travel the world helping people. In secret, the Gods reveal they need Cain to become the strongest living creature by his 16th birthday to prevent a great evil.
2	"My Tutors Are Adventurers"; Transliteration: "Katei Kyōshi wa Bōkensha" (Japanese: 家庭教師は冒険者)	Mitsutaka Noshitani	Jun Narita	Noriyuki Nakamura	April 10, 2023
Garm hires Cain two D rank adventurers as tutors: swordswoman Milly and elven magician Nina. They struggle to teach him as Cain has level 10 blessings from the Gods of War and Magic and is superior in skill to the level 3 Milly and Nina already. As he is only lacking in practical experience, they take him to the wilderness where he easily hunts his first monsters and immediately masters every new spell Nina shows him. Cain finds out that hunting just a few monsters raises him straight to skill level 8 as one of his blessings gives him 100 times more experience points than normal. While getting permission from guild receptionist Rudy for Cain to hunt stronger monsters, C rank adventurer Crosse mocks them for their "babysitting quest" and tries to spend time with them, so Cain beats him up. Three years later, Cain is 8 and Nina and Milly's employment contract expires, so Cain hunts dangerous monsters to craft them valuable thank-you gifts; his flashy magic causing a panic in the city. Milly and Nina are touched by the gifts, Magic Bags that mimic Cain's Item Storage skill, which are both useful and as valuable as national treasures. Later, Garm thoroughly lectures Cain for scaring the citizens.
3	"To the Royal Capital"; Transliteration: "Iza Ōto e" (Japanese: いざ王都へ)	Hiroyuki Okuno, Noriyuki Nakamura	Rinrin	Noriyuki Nakamura	April 17, 2023
Two years later Cain is 10 and a seasoned adventurer. As a noble, he is sent to the royal capital for his debut into society. On the way, he kills monsters attacking a carriage carrying Duke Eric's daughter Lady Silk and Royal Second Princess Telestia, who both develop crushes on Cain for rescuing them. As they are also on their way to debut, they insist Cain share their carriage. Stopping for the night, the girls overrule Garm's objections and force Cain to sleep in their room every night for the week long journey, though this makes Cain so nervous that he couldn't sleep for the week. Reaching the capital Cain is able to return Telestia's dead soldiers, earning gratitude from vice-captain Daim. Telestia's father King Rex rewards Cain with 10 platinum coins, a mansion and promotes him to Baron despite the objections of some nobles, particularly Marquis Corgino. In private, Rex and Eric insist Cain become engaged to both Telestia and Silk; having shared bedrooms with both of them, Cain is now the only man they can marry without scandal. Pressured from all sides Cain agrees to the engagements. With the formalities over Rex, Eric, Prime Minister Magna, and even Garm are able to freely lecture Cain for his scandalous, outrageous behavior.
4	"Debut in the Royal Capital"; Transliteration: "Ōto Ohirome-kai" (Japanese: 王都お披露目会)	Yasumi Mikamoto	Rinrin	Yūko Kiyoshima	April 24, 2023
Cain consults the Gods about his levels which are fast approaching the power of a demigod, but the Gods are all so starved of entertainment, they dismiss his concerns and ask him to introduce forms of Japanese entertainment to the world. Cain visits Parma, a cat-girl he knew since childhood who works at her uncle Tamanis' store. Tamanis agrees to produce a Reversi board game through his trading company. By signing a contract before Panam, God of Commerce, their business deal is guaranteed for three years. The debut ceremony arrives and, since their engagements are still secret, Cain has to pretend to meet Silk and Telestia for the first time. Cain gifts Rex with an extravagant Reversi board, which the king is delighted with. Marquis Corgino's bratty son, Habit, attempts to charm Silk but when she ignores him, he and his friends try and fail to bully Cain with their level 1 magic spells. Fed up, Silk reveals Cain is a full baron, forcing Habit and his friends, mere viscount's sons, to bow and apologize. To keep everything secret, Silk and Telestia extort romantic dates from Cain, overheard by Rex and Eric, who once again lecture Cain for being a philandering womanizer.
5	"Welcome to My Off-the-Charts Mansion"; Transliteration: "Yarisugi Yashiki e Yōkoso" (Japanese: やりすぎ屋敷へようこそ)	Takashi Satō	Natsuko Takahashi, Jun Narita	Keizō Shimizu	May 1, 2023
Cain visits his new mansion and finds it run down and neglected, yet with his magic, it is cleaned and repaired in seconds. He hires Sylvia, three maids, and a butler named Colan. Cain visits his parents as his older half-brothers Djinn and Alec are also visiting. While showing them his mansion, Garm advises Cain to throw a party for other nobles to acknowledge his new Baron title. Cain decides to craft fine glassware as gifts, along with Japanese food and alcohol. Rex insists on attending with Telestia, though it is unusual for royals to attend parties hosted by low-level nobles. The nobles are surprised Cain keeps a taxidermy Calamity Class Red Dragon monster as a trophy. Rex is particularly fond of the glasses and the alcohol. Marquis Corgino arrives late, insults everyone, criticizes the food and demands he be given all the glassware as a gift. Cain allows him to do so before revealing Rex's presence, who is furious, causing Corgino to flee in disgrace. Cain doesn't escape either as Rex, realizing Cain used him as a pawn against Corgino, loudly lectures him for two hours on how a Baron/son-in-law should properly treat a king/father-in-law.
6	"A Date with the Strongest Captain of the Knights"; Transliteration: "Saikyō Kishi Danchō to no Dēto" (Japanese: 最強騎士団長との決闘(デート))	Mitsutaka Noshitani	Masahiro Ōkubo	Mitsutaka Noshitani	May 8, 2023
Daim asks Cain to attend a knights training session. Knight captain and elvish Viscountess Tifana asks to duel him, but when Cain defeats her, she proposes marriage and drags a bewildered Cain to discuss it with Rex. Rex is furious as Tifana is also a princess for the Elven territory in Esfort. Rex is forced to agree as long as Tifana's father Duke Laysan agrees. Cain's growing power worries Rex, so Magna suggests they test him. Tifana begins demanding duels every day, which also increases Cain's skills even further. Cain is summoned by Rex, Eric, Garm, Daim and Magna and presented with a magician's Grimoire, written by Yuuya Esfort, the kingdom's first king, founder, and Rex's ancestor. Cain reads it easily, confirming Rex's suspicions as it is written in Yuuya's unknown language, Japanese. Cain is forced to admit to being a reincarnation from Japan blessed by all seven Gods, but insists on keeping this secret from the public and maintaining his current lifestyle, which Rex accepts and strictly has everyone in the room not tell anyone else about Cain's true colors. Tifana receives Laysan's permission to marry Cain. Rex feels confident Cain will make a fine future King of Esfort. Rex decides not to lecture Cain; he is instead lectured by Telestia and Silk on recklessly seducing every woman he meets.
7	"Cain, the Rookie Adventurer"; Transliteration: "Shinjin Bōkensha Kain" (Japanese: 新人冒険者カイン)	Toshikatsu Tokoro	Jun Narita	Keiki Kurumino	May 15, 2023
Cain reaches 12 years old and registers at the Adventurers Guild. Secretary Retia issues his G Rank license. Other adventurers cause trouble for Retia, but they are scared away by A Rank adventurer Claude. Claude advises Cain to join a party, and then is dragged away by his wife and adventurer partner Lina. Cain takes a job slaying goblins but is found by Tifana, who insists on joining him. Tifana slays the goblins while Cain deals with Green Lizards nearby, unintentionally stealing a quest from Millie and Nina. Vice guild master Cedric accuses Cain of lying about slaying the lizards himself, thinking that he is only a commoner. Cain is saved by Guild Master Eden, Tifana's older brother. Fully aware of Cain's power, Eden promotes him directly to A Rank so he can assign him the most dangerous quests. Cedric gives a grovelling apology, now aware that Cain is a baron. The Gods watch this with some amusement, but need Cain to be even stronger as the dark god Aaron will soon awaken to destroy the world. To this end, they decide he needs an instructor and have just the one in mind. Telestia and Silk learn Cain took Tifana on a "date" and force him to grovel for their forgiveness.
8	"The Royal Academy"; Transliteration: "Ōritsu Gakuen" (Japanese: 王立学園)	Kazuya Kitō	Rinrin	Nagisa Miyazaki	May 22, 2023
Cain attends the entrance exam for Royal Academy. After a written test, Cain accidentally destroys the magic safety barrier during the magic exam, then duels Claude to a draw during the swordsmanship exam. Rex lectures Cain for destroying the expensive barrier and for obliviously taking the exam meant for commoners when he was supposed to take the nobles exam. Cain learns he got a perfect score and has to give the welcoming speech. At the entrance ceremony after Cain's speech, Rex gives a speech that blatantly warns Cain not to cause more trouble. During homeroom with Instructor Elka, Cain chooses to study Adventuring, Magic and Magic Items; Telestia chooses Internal Affairs, planning to manage Cain's noble domain, while Silk chooses Commerce to manage Cain's business affairs, embarrassing him. Cain spots Habit trying to bully Parma into quitting school so he can have her spot in A Class, only to flee when he realizes she is Cain's childhood friend. Cain suspects he will soon be lectured when Telestia and Silk become friends with Parma. A psychic message directs Cain to the library where he is teleported away by a man who knows Cain is a reincarnation and that his original name was Shiina Kazuya.
9	"Training"; Transliteration: "Shugyō" (Japanese: 修行)	Noriyuki Nakamura	Saeka Fujimoto	Noriyuki Nakamura	May 29, 2023
The man is Yuuya Hirasawa, aka Yuuya Terra Esfort, the first king and founder of Esfort. Yuuya reveals he created his own world, Fabneil, becoming its new God of Creation. Yuuya has agreed to train Cain and hints that Aaron has links to Cain's former life. He dumps Cain in the wilderness thousands of miles away but warns in this world monsters are much tougher. Plus, time moves differently so Cain has years of time while barely any time will pass in Esfort. Cain rescues a Fenrir puppy he names Haku and they survive four brutal years before making it back to Yuuya's home. Yuuya reveals Aaron was the 8th God of Amusement, but he became corrupt and set kingdoms against each other in death games to amuse himself. Yuuya also reveals when he was reincarnated from Japan so were two others, Seiya and Megumi, Cain's parents who died in a car crash. They became Yuuya's precious friends but were killed fighting Aaron, though Yuuya was successful in sealing him away. Cain is sent to train as a warrior with the elf Derain. After another year Cain defeats Derain and is returned to Esfort with Haku and Derain's pet dragon Gin. Yuuya gives him a sword and note for Rex. Cain tearfully reunites with Telestia and Silk after five years apart, only to be viciously lectured since from their perspective he was missing for almost a week.
10	"The Trials of an A-Rank Adventurer"; Transliteration: "Ē Ranku Bōkensha no Shiren" (Japanese: Aランク冒険者の試練)	Nana Imanaka, Noriyuki Nakamura, Mitsutaka Noshitani	Masahiro Ōkubo	Nana Imanaka	June 5, 2023
Rex is astounded at Cain's story, but accepts it is true after seeing Yuuya's katana, which he lets Cain keep. Eric reminds Cain he never finished the bandit capture quest needed to promote him to A rank, and having been missing for seven days, the time limit will soon expire. Cain captures the bandits, also rescuing Millie and Nina, who had been escorting Sabinos, Parma's father and Tamanis' brother. Millie and Nina are shocked Cain is now A rank, and a Baron. At the guild, Cain meets Claude, who reveals Millie is his sister. Realizing Cain is also an academy student, Claude, Lina, Millie, and Nina attend as guest lecturers to help Cain, but notice Cain doesn't fit in with the other students at all. They try to help Cain stand out to become popular, but fail spectacularly. Frustrated at Claude's idiocy, Cain rampages through the monster filled forest, unintentionally frightening the kingdom into thinking a Demon Lord has appeared and earning his most serious lecture yet from both Rex and Garm. Back in the forest, Cain's rampage dislodges a crystal from its hiding place which is eaten by a dragon, which is then possessed by a fragment of the returning Aaron.
11	"Omen of an Onslaught"; Transliteration: "Hanran no Yochō" (Japanese: 氾濫の予兆)	Mitsutaka Noshitani	Masahiro Ōkubo	Noriyuki Nakamura, Keizō Shimizu	June 12, 2023
Cain's class begin contracting with monsters. Cain's instructor Gratt naively lets Cain try and ends up summoning Seth, a Prince of Darkness and ruler of a nation of demons. Cain panics, until Seth sees Cain's magic level and happily grovels to become Cain's contracted servant. Rex is furious as Seth could have destroyed the kingdom. He demands to see Cain's full magic status, only to find his magic capacity is immeasurable, and Cain now possesses the title Demigod. Unsure of what else to do, Rex makes Cain a Viscount and gifts him a whole territory to manage. If Cain does so successfully, Rex will publicly announce his engagements to Telestia and Silk. Cain's older half-brother Djinn informs Cain monsters near the forest in their domain are becoming more savage, so he asks Cain to investigate the cause. Cain slays many monsters but cannot identify the source of the increased danger. Seth can only sense a being of unimaginable power drawing monsters to itself, and sends his demon butler and former Heavenly King Dalmatia, to investigate. Their intrusion prompts Aaron to send thousands of high level monsters to rampage against the kingdom. Realizing Aaron is responsible, Cain, Seth, and Dalmatia rush to confront him, leaving Cain's friends protecting the city.
12	"Then I Became Lord of a Domain"; Transliteration: "Soshite Ryōshu ni Naru" (Japanese: そして領主になる)	Noriyuki Nakamura	Natsuko Takahashi	Noriyuki Nakamura	June 19, 2023
Cain's friends, along with Seth, summoning his Four Heavenly Kings, keep the monsters confined to the forest. Cain locates the Aaron-possessed dragon, who immediately knows he is the Gods' champion, and a reincarnation like his parents. Despite only being a small fragment of Aaron, Aaron keeps Cain on the defensive and almost kills Haku and Gin. Cain activates his Overload ability and obliterates Aaron's current host, as well as the forest and mountain behind him. Esfort is saved, but Rex is furious as the Overload's golden light has cause the citizens to believe the Gods have descended from Heaven. Rex is exhausted from yelling and decides to retire and let Cain become King. Magna calms Rex down, who decides to make Cain Viscount of Dorinthol instead. Telestia is furious as Dorinthol's adventurer guild is famously corrupt and it is now Cain's job to deal with them. Seth's wife Lefahne discovers him cheating so he begs Cain for protection. Cain sends him back with Lefahne for punishment but worries how he will survive having multiple wives. Arriving in Dorinthol, Cain defeats the entire adventurers guild, accidentally destroys the training arena, gets himself arrested, makes an enemy of the church by demanding they lower taxes, and builds himself a mansion even larger than Esfort's royal palace. Having really gone too far this time, Cain is loudly lectured by everybody all at once.

== Reception ==
MrAJCosplay from Anime News Network praised the magic system of the series, though felt that nothing was very memorable.

The series has sold over 2.8 million copies.

== See also ==
- Hell Mode, another light novel series with the same illustrator
