= A Journey Through Another World =

Japanese light novel series

- A Journey Through Another World: Raising Kids While Adventuring
- First light novel volume cover

異世界ゆるり紀行 ～子育てしながら冒険者します～ (Isekai Yururi Kikō: Kosodate Shinagara Bōkensha Shimasu)
- Genre: Isekai
- Novel series
- Written by: Shizuru Minazuki
- Published by: AlphaPolis
- Original run: June 2, 2016 – present
- Light novel
- Written by: Shizuru Minazuki
- Illustrated by: Yamakawa
- Published by: AlphaPolis
- English publisher: NA: Hanashi Media
- Original run: April 28, 2017 – present
- Volumes: 18
- Manga
- Written by: Shizuru Minazuki
- Illustrated by: Tomomi Mizuna
- Published by: AlphaPolis
- English publisher: Alpha Manga
- Original run: January 17, 2018 – present
- Volumes: 9
- Anime television series
- Directed by: Atsushi Nigorikawa
- Written by: Atsushi Maekawa
- Music by: Akinari Suzuki
- Studio: EMT Squared; Bros. Bird
- Licensed by: Crunchyroll (Note: In North America through Crunchyroll, LLC.); SEA: Muse Communication
- Original network: TV Tokyo
- Original run: July 8, 2024 – September 23, 2024
- Episodes: 12

A Journey Through Another World: Raising Kids While Adventuring (異世界ゆるり紀行 ～子育てしながら冒険者します～, Isekai Yururi Kikō: Kosodate Shinagara Bōkensha Shimasu) is a Japanese light novel series written by Shizuru Minazuki and illustrated by Yamakawa. Originally published online since June 2016, AlphaPolis has published nineteen volumes of the series since April 2017, with two of the volumes published in English by Hanashi Media since April 2026. A manga adaptation illustrated by Tomomi Mizuna began serialization online via AlphaPolis' manga website in January 2018 and has been collected in twelve tankōbon volumes; the manga is published digitally in English through Alpha Manga since July 2021, which has been collected in eleven volumes. An anime television series adaptation produced by EMT Squared and Bros. Bird aired from July to September 2024.

== Characters ==
=== Main characters ===
Takumi Kayano (茅野巧, Kayano Takumi)
Voiced by: Yusuke Shirai (Japanese); Matt Shipman (English)
A seemingly ordinary Japanese man sent to another world called Etelldia, who was tasked to take care of fraternal twin siblings.
Alan/Allen (Note: First name is used in the Alpha Manga translation and in the Crunchyroll anime dub and subtitles; second name is used in the Hanashi Media light-novel translation.) (アレン, Aren)
Voiced by: Aina Suzuki (Japanese); Lara Woodhull (English)
The boy of the twins. Like his sister, he has a water-based ability. The child of a water god. He and Elena tend to speak in unison
Elena (エレナ, Erena)
Voiced by: Miharu Hanai (Japanese); Kiane Chula King (English)
The girl of the twins. Like her brother, she has a water-based ability. The child of a water god. Its rare for her not to speak in unison with Allen.
Sylphyryll/Sylphyriel (シルフィリール, Shirufirīru)
Voiced by: Haruka Tomatsu (Japanese); Nia Celeste (English)
The wind god of Etelldia. Accidentally killed Takumi while trying to fix a rift in space-time, compensated for it by reviving him, giving him a new body, and sending him off to the Forest of Gaia, where he fought monsters and found the twin siblings.

=== Secondary characters ===
Granvault Lowain/Granvalt Luwen (グランヴァルト・ルーウェン, Guranvaruto Rūwen)
Voiced by: Kazuki Ura (Japanese); Monty Thompson (English)
Second Captain of a local branch (Shireen Branch) of an order of knights (the Knights of Guadia), which protected its citizens from monsters coming from the nearby Forest of Gaia. Nicknamed Vault.
Luna (ルーナ, Rūna)
Voiced by: Satomi Amano (Japanese); Kelly Greenshield (English)
Receptionist at Shireen's local Adventurer's Guild. Has an obsession for rare items like carcasses from defeated strong monsters.
Johan, "Guild Master" (ヨハン「ギルドマスター」)
Voiced by: Kazumasa Nakamura (Japanese); David Wald (English)
Guild master at Shireen's local Adventurer's Guild.
Issac Risner/Isaac Lisner (アイザック・リスナー, Isaac Risunā)
Voiced by: Shun'ichi Toki (Japanese); Kevin Thelwell (English)
A high-ranking knight in Etelldia, bearing the title of "Vice Captain of the Shireen Branch of the Knights of Guadia". Often gives hour-long lectures to his superior Granvault whenever the latter acts hastily instead of thinking through his decisions first.

=== Contracted beasts ===
Joule (ジュール)
Voiced by: Maki Kawase
Fenrir
Feat/Fyt (フィート)
Voiced by: Hiyori Kono
Heavenly Tiger
Bolt (ボルト)
Voiced by: Tomohiro Ono
Thunder Hawk
Vector (ベクトル)
Scarlet King Leo

== Media ==
=== Light novel ===
Written by Shizuru Minazuki, A Journey Through Another World: Raising Kids While Adventuring began serialization as a web novel on AlphaPolis' website on June 2, 2016, as well as on the popular web-novel platform Shōsetsuka ni Narō. During the month of September of that same year, AlphaPolis hosted the 9th Fantasy Novel Grand Prix, an annual literary contest where participants submitted their original web novels with the hopes of seeing them someday accepted for commercial publishing as books. Out of 1,406 total works submitted to the contest, and after making it into the list of 15 finalists, A Journey Through Another World placed in second place, earning the Special Award alongside Shiki's An Observation Log of My Fiancée Who Calls Herself a Villainess (which had placed sixth).

After the editors at AlphaPolis contacted the authors of the Grand Prix finalists (including Minazuki) with regards to discussing commercialization of their works, Minazuki announced on March 14, 2017, that AlphaPolis accepted publishing A Journey Through Another World as a light novel. Because of AlphaPolis' content guidelines that require withdrawing, taking down, or privatizing web chapters slated to be published in book form (as well as deleting them completely from any other websites where they had been cross-posted), on March 25 A Journey Through Another World was removed from Shōsetsuka ni Narō and its first 30 chapters (the main corpus of Volume 1) were delisted from public view on AlphaPolis, while newer chapters that were not yet part of a book volume were still being posted on AlphaPolis.

Incorporating illustrations drawn by Yamakawa, Volume 1 was published on April 28. Nineteen volumes have been released as of May 2026.

In February 2026, Hanashi Media announced that they had licensed the light novel for English publication. Two volumes have been licensed and released (only in digital e-book format) as of July 2026.

No.	Original release date	Original ISBN	English release date	English ISBN
1	April 28, 2017	978-4-43-423243-5	April 30, 2026 (digital)	978-1-961788-58-9
2	August 31, 2017	978-4-43-423689-1	July 30, 2026 (digital)	978-1-961788-72-5
3	December 28, 2017	978-4-43-424126-0	October 29, 2026 (digital)	978-1-961788-85-5
4	May 31, 2018	978-4-43-424687-6	—	—
5	October 31, 2018	978-4-43-425279-2	—	—
6	March 25, 2019	978-4-43-425804-6	—	—
7	September 30, 2019	978-4-43-426513-6	—	—
8	March 31, 2020	978-4-43-427241-7	—	—
9	September 30, 2020	978-4-43-427887-7	—	—
10	March 31, 2021	978-4-43-428663-6	—	—
11	September 30, 2021	978-4-43-429399-3	—	—
12	March 31, 2022	978-4-434-30087-5	—	—
13	September 30, 2022	978-4-43-430878-9	—	—
14	March 31, 2023	978-4-43-431752-1	—	—
15	September 30, 2023	978-4-43-432655-4	—	—
16	June 30, 2024	978-4-43-434066-6	—	—
17	February 28, 2025	978-4-43-435352-9	—	—
18	September 30, 2025	978-4-43-436429-7	—	—
19	May 31, 2026	978-4-43-437792-1	—	—

=== Manga ===
A manga adaptation illustrated by Tomomi Mizuna began serialization on AlphaPolis' manga website on January 17, 2018. Twelve volumes have been released as of May 2026.

The manga is published digitally in English through Alpha Manga. Eleven volumes have been licensed and released digitally as of May 2026.

No.	Original release date	Original ISBN	English release date	English ISBN
1	November 30, 2018	978-4-43-425228-0	March 31, 2023 (digital)	—
2	August 31, 2019	978-4-43-426236-4	March 31, 2023 (digital)	—
3	April 30, 2020	978-4-43-427344-5	March 31, 2023 (digital)	—
4	February 28, 2021	978-4-43-428562-2	August 25, 2023 (digital)	—
5	October 31, 2021	978-4-43-429511-9	December 22, 2023 (digital)	—
6	August 31, 2022	978-4-43-430759-1	April 26, 2024 (digital)	—
7	March 31, 2023	978-4-43-431764-4	August 23, 2024 (digital)	—
8	December 31, 2023	978-4-43-433119-0	December 20, 2024 (digital)	—
9	June 30, 2024	978-4-43-434055-0	May 23, 2025 (digital)	—
10	January 31, 2025	978-4-43-435158-7	November 28, 2025 (digital)	—
11	October 31, 2025	978-4-43-436641-3	May 29, 2026 (digital)	—
12	May 31, 2026	978-4-43-437818-8	—	—

=== Anime ===
An anime television series adaptation was announced in November 2023. It is produced by EMT Squared and Bros. Bird and directed by Atsushi Nigorikawa, with Atsushi Maekawa handling series composition, Yuki Nakano designing the characters, and Akinari Suzuki composing the music. The series aired from July 8 to September 23, 2024, on TV Tokyo and other networks. (Note: TV Tokyo lists the series premiere on July 7, 2024, at 25:50, which is effectively July 8 at 1:50 a.m. JST.) The opening theme song is "Yururing Travel Days" (ゆるリング Travel days) performed by Tebasaki Sensation, while the ending theme song is "Makuake" performed by Gohobi. Crunchyroll licensed the series for streaming outside of Asia; five audio languages (Japanese, English, Latin American Spanish, Brazilian Portuguese, and German) were made available in simulcast. Muse Communication licensed the series in Southeast Asia.

==== Episodes ====
No.	Title	Directed by	Written by	Storyboarded by	Chief animation directed by	Original release date
1	"Another World and Twins"; Transliteration: "Isekai to, Futago" (Japanese: いせかいと、ふたご)	Atsushi Nigorikawa	Atsushi Maekawa	Atsushi Nigorikawa	Hironori Nakano	July 8, 2024
Takumi Kayano is mistakenly killed by the god Sylphyryll, the Wind God. As an apology, Syl reincarnates Takumi into Etelldia where he's thrown into the world of adventuring and meets a pair of orphaned children in the Forest of Gaia. He names them Alan and Elena and learns they're not quite ordinary, then adopts them. The trio register as adventurers and join an expedition to cull monsters in the very forest they just came out of.
2	"Nice to Meet You, Joule"; Transliteration: "Yoroshikune, Jūru" (Japanese: よろしくね、じゅーる)	Yūki Kusakabe	Atsushi Maekawa	Atsushi Nigorikawa	Eri Tokugawa	July 15, 2024 (Note: From Episode 2 onwards, episodes are released on select platforms (such as U-NEXT, Crunchyroll and simulcast platforms by Muse Asia) a week before their televised airings.)
Takumi, Alan, and Elena continue taking guild jobs and Takumi introduces new recipes to the world with dessert breads. After ranking up at the guild, Takumi takes the twins to the local labyrinth for some training and end up clearing the whole thing. An unknown individual gifts Takumi a contracted beast, a Fenrir he names Joule. Rather than being gifted by Syl, it was gifted by the head of the Water God's household. Jealous someone beat him to the punch, Syl gifts Takumi two contracted beasts: a Heavenly Tiger and a Thunder Hawk.
3	"Monster Hunting!"; Transliteration: "Mamono, Tōbatsu！" (Japanese: まものー、とうばつー！)	Hideki Takayama	Atsushi Maekawa	Atsushi Nigorikawa	Kim Jun-oh; Lee Jae-ho	July 22, 2024
Takumi names the tiger Feat and the hawk Bolt. The monster hunting expedition begins and the trio feel something is amiss when they feel like they're being watched. Granvault "Vault" Lowain, Second Captain of the local branch of knights, and Issac Risner, Vice Captain, join their group. Takumi learns he's apparently unusually powerful and something strange is going on in the forest. One of the other teams sets off a flair asking for reinforcements and the trio arrive just in time to help.
4	"Taku Gets Mad"; Transliteration: "Onii-chan, Okoru" (Japanese: おにいちゃんー、おこるー)	Naoya Murakawa	Saeka Fujimoto	Toshihiko Masuda	Ryo Yamauchi	July 29, 2024 (Note: This episode aired at 2:00 a.m. JST, 10 minutes after the original air time.)
The expedition continues and Takumi, being the only one who can actually cook, becomes the de facto cook for the group. Still, he feels like they're being watched and things remain off in the forest. An Evil Viper attacks and proves difficult to defeat, causing the twins to be injured. Takumi uses advanced wind magic to kill it then finds the person who has been watching them, who turns out to be a knight jealous of Takumi's friendship with Vault. The expedition comes to a close, Takumi gets promoted to Rank A, and the twins are promoted to Rank D to keep them safe from appearing too powerful.
5	"We're Gonna Beat the Goblins!"; Transliteration: "Goburin, Taosu!" (Japanese: ゴブリン、たおすー！)	Takeyuki Sadowara	Atsushi Maekawa	Hirato Kato	Eri Tokugawa	August 5, 2024
Takumi teaches Alan and Elena math and takes them shopping. The next day, the trio pick up some guild quests. After finding a lost kitty, they take a job to slay some goblins. Takumi tries using his new water magic abilities but fails. While reading the kids a bedtime story, he learns they've never seen the ocean and decides to leave town to show them more of the world. As they leave, a slave trader arrives and claims Alan and Elena are his property, demanding Takumi return them.
6	"The Ocean! It's Salty!"; Transliteration: "Umi! Shoppai!" (Japanese: うみー！ しょっぱーい！)	Haruhi Kosaka	Atsushi Maekawa	Haruhi Kosaka	Yuki Nakano	August 12, 2024
After the slave trader causes a ruckus, he is arrested when Vault and Issac arrive to see the trio off. Issac gives Takumi a letter of introduction to give to the lord of the town they're headed for, claiming the lord is a personal acquaintance and will look after them. Upon arriving at the beach, the twins are enthralled. A mermaid, Millena, arrives and pleads for their help. Given special bracelets that allow them to breathe under water, they go to Millena's village where Takumi is asked to remove a sunken ship blocking the entrance to a special underwater cave.
7	"Mermaids! Dragons!"; Transliteration: "Ningyo! Riyu!" (Japanese: にんぎょ！りゅー！)	Han Yeonghun	Koichi Ohata	Saeka Fujimoto	Yuki Nakano	August 19, 2024
Takumi is thanked by the mermaid priestess and the village head. As a reward, he requests training in water magic for him and the twins, although the priestess also insists on a tangible reward. Syl chastises the Water God's head retainer for involving Takumi in more trouble after he's faced nothing but trouble since arriving in Etelldia. Syl's retainer reveals Takumi's presence in their world is a blessing but doesn't explain why. The trio are approached by a Leviathan, Kaiser, who claims Alan and Elena are children of the Water God, offering aid to all three if the need should ever arise and gives them one of his scales.
8	"Crab! Crab!"; Transliteration: "Kani! Kani!" (Japanese: かーに！ かーに！)	Haruhi Kosaka	Yoriko Tomita	Shiyo Hatsumida	Sonomi Sugimura	August 26, 2024
The trio arrive back in the mermaid village but depart for the surface shortly after. On their way, they find another labyrinth and decide to explore part of it before taking a break. Making it to the tenth floor, they fight the floor's boss and find another mermaid bracelet before heading for their original destination. They explore the town before visiting the lord. Takumi takes Kaiser's scale to a blacksmith to make it easier to carry around and also requests some armor be made with the Evil Viper's remains.
9	"What's a Dad?"; Transliteration: "Papatte, Nani?" (Japanese: パパって、なーに?)	Yuki Kusakabe	Atsushi Maekawa	Noriyoshi Nakamura	Eri Tokugawa	September 2, 2024
While speaking with Syl, Takumi is officially designated as one of Syl's disciples. However, his official disciple "specialty" is nurturing and education, which fall under the Creator God's domain, who he has also been blessed by, and Syl is frustrated his specialty isn't related to wind since he's his disciple. Takumi also receives gifts, including another contracted beast, from the Fire God for improving the cooking in Etelldia. Later, he meets said beast, a Scarlet King Leo he names Vector. They decide to take on more guild quests and learn the labyrinth they explored was previously undiscovered, making them the first party to ever explore it, and the guild is required to report it to the provincial lord, who turns out to be Issac's older brother, Cedric.
10	"I Hope We Can Make Friends..."; Transliteration: "O Tomodachi……Dekiru Kana……" (Japanese: おともだち……できるかな……)	Shigeo Koshi	Saeka Fujimoto	Atsushi Nigorikawa	Yuki Nakano; Sonomi Sugimura	September 9, 2024
While explaining the details of the labyrinth to Cedric, Takumi learns that anyone who discovers a labyrinth is entitled to compensation. The trio have lunch with Cedric, his wife, and their two sons, and Takumi shares more recipes. Cedric invites them to stay in his mansion while they remain in town. Back with Vault and Issac, they discuss Takumi and his outrageous luck finding a new labyrinth, as well as his impending (and unwanted) fame, which they fear may drive Takumi and the kids to leave the kingdom. Takumi and the twins visit the town with Cedric and his sons.
11	"Vector Does a Good Job!"; Transliteration: "Beku Toru, Dai Katsu Yaku!" (Japanese: べくとるー、だいかつやくー！)	Kim Seong-il	Yoriko Tomita	Atsushi Nigorikawa	Jeong Woo-yeong	September 16, 2024 (Note: This episode aired at 2:26 a.m. JST, 36 minutes after the original air time.)
While exploring the town, Takumi learns the sunken ship he cleaned up for the mermaids is associated with a trading company there. He offers to return the wreckage for free, but Cedric and the trading company's local branch owner explain the general rule for finding loot is "finders, keepers," though he still chooses to return everything. He then introduces yet more new recipes to Etelldia. Afterwards, the trio and the contracted beasts go exploring and find some bandits. They clear out the base and free their prisoners.
12	"Bye-Bye! See You Next Time!"; Transliteration: "Baibai, Matane!" (Japanese: ばいばーい、またね！)	Atsushi Nigorikawa	Atsushi Maekawa	Atsushi Nigorikawa	Yuki Nakano	September 23, 2024 (Note: This episode aired at 2:20 a.m. JST, 30 minutes after the original air time.)
Takumi returns to the blacksmiths' shop to retrieve their completed items. After returning some of the bandits' stolen loot, they visit the mermaids to get a few bracelets for the beasts then head back to the labyrinth. The final boss proves to be no match for the might of all seven of them attacking simultaneously, and Takumi takes the fire sword drop for himself. Back in town, Vault and Issac have come to escort the trio to the royal capital to meet the king. The twins have a tearful goodbye with Cedric's sons, then they all depart for the capital.

== See also ==
- The Daily Life of a Middle-Aged Online Shopper in Another World, a light novel series also illustrated by Yamakawa
