= Miharu Hanai =

Japanese voice actress and singer (born 1998)

- 花井美春
- Born: Miharu Suzuki (鈴木美春); 8 February 1998 (age 28)
- Occupations: Voice actress; singer
- Years active: 2017–present
- Agent: Atrays
- Notable work: The Idolmaster Cinderella Girls as Tomoe Murakami; Smile of the Arsnotoria as Mel; Chronicles of an Aristocrat Reborn in Another World as Reine von Silford; Harmony of Mille-Feuille as Urū Miyazaki; A Journey Through Another World as Elena; You and Idol Precure as Meroron/Meron Tanaka/Cure Kiss; Umamusume: Pretty Derby as Twin Turbo
- Relatives: Aina Suzuki (sister)

Miharu Hanai (Japanese: 花井 美春, Hepburn: Hanai Miharu; born 8 February 1998) is a Japanese voice actress and singer. As a child, she won folk music contests alongside her sister Aina Suzuki before debuting as a voice actress in 2017, voicing Sassa Kurasaki in Armed Girl's Machiavellism. Since then, she has voiced Tomoe Murakami in The Idolmaster Cinderella Girls, Twin Turbo in Umamusume: Pretty Derby, Shiori Yamaga in Selection Project, Meroron/Meron Tanaka/Cure Kiss in You and Idol Precure, Pekesura in My Isekai Life, Mel in Smile of the Arsnotoria, Reine von Silford in Chronicles of an Aristocrat Reborn in Another World, Urū Miyazaki in Harmony of Mille-Feuille, and Elena in A Journey Through Another World.

== Biography ==
Miharu Hanai, a native of Chitose, Hokkaido, was born on 8 February 1998. After being unsuccessful in her dream of joining the Takarazuka Revue, which she originally wanted to do because she "really likes singing and expressing herself in front of people", she decided to pursue a career in voice acting after watching the anime K-On!. She then studied acting at International Media Gakuin; after her graduation, she joined IAM Agency, remaining with them until 31 January 2025.

In February 2017, Hanai was cast as Sassa Kurasaki in Armed Girl's Machiavellism. She later voiced Non in Rainy Cocoa side G (2019), Lierre in Dropkick on My Devil! (2020), Twin Turbo in Umamusume: Pretty Derby (2021), and Shiori Yamaga in Selection Project (2021). In May 2021, she was cast as Fumio Chitose/Yellow in Hairpin Double, the thirtieth-anniversary animated short from the Okayama International Circuit. In 2022, she voiced Margarita Surprise in GrimGrimoire OnceMore, Pekesura in My Isekai Life, and Mel in Smile of the Arsnotoria. In 2023, she voiced Reine von Silford in Chronicles of an Aristocrat Reborn in Another World.

Hanai voices Tomoe Murakami in The Idolmaster Cinderella Girls, a sub-franchise in The Idolmaster franchise. Since then, she has performed as a singer on several Idolmaster music releases, including the 2020 single "The Idolmaster Cinderella Starlight Master for the Next! 07: Gaze and Gaze", which charted at #7 in the Oricon Singles Chart), and the 2021 single "The Idolmaster Cinderella Girls Starlight Master Gold Rush! 08: Evil Live", which charted at #16 in the Oricon Singles Chart. She also stars as Urū Miyazaki in Harmony of Mille-Feuille, an a capella mixed-media project.

Although it had been rumored for some time due to their similarities, Hanai and her sister Aina Suzuki had not disclosed their familial relationship to prevent any signs of nepotism. However, on 30 November 2023, it was confirmed at the press conference announcing their roles in the upcoming anime A Journey Through Another World that they were sisters; she was also announced as the voice actor for Elena.

Hanai is a certified 5th dan folk singer and a 4th dan shamisen player. She and Suzuki began practicing folk music after being instructed by her grandfather, and they spent at least seven years in the Shōseikai circle, winning several folk song contests. Hanai has won several competitions in the national, regional, and local levels, including in Esashi oiwake, Hokkai bon'uta, jinku, and kudoki.

== Filmography ==
=== Animated television ===
Year	Title	Role	Ref.
2017	Anonymous Noise	High school girl	
2017	Armed Girl's Machiavellism	Sassa Kurasaki	
2017	The Idolmaster Cinderella Girls Theater	Tomoe Murakami	
2017	The Royal Tutor	Girl	
2018	Anima Yell!	Basketball club members, additional voices	
2018	Gurazeni	Female clerk	
2019	Actors: Songs Connection		
2019	Rainy Cocoa side G	Non	
2019	Tenka Hyakken: Meiji-kan e Yōkoso	Momijigari Kanemitsu	
2020	D4DJ First Mix	Yukino Akashi	
2020	Dropkick on My Devil!	Lierre	
2021	Selection Project	Shiori Yamaga	
2021	Umamusume: Pretty Derby Season 2	Twin Turbo	
2021	Visual Prison	Fan	
2022	Miss Shachiku and the Little Baby Ghost	Female employee	
2022	My Isekai Life	Pekesura	
2022	Sabikui Bisco	Plum	
2022	Smile of the Arsnotoria	Mel	
2023	A Galaxy Next Door	Keigo Komaki	
2023	Apparently, Disillusioned Adventurers Will Save the World	Fill	
2023	Chronicles of an Aristocrat Reborn in Another World	Reine von Silford	
2023	Eternal Boys	Women, High school girl	
2023	Giant Beasts of Ars	Tiri	
2023	In Another World with My Smartphone	Fredmonica	
2023	Saving 80,000 Gold in Another World for My Retirement	Beatrice	
2023	Umamusume: Pretty Derby Season 3	Twin Turbo	
2023	World Dai Star	Xue Wang	
2024	A Journey Through Another World	Elena	
2024	Acro Trip	Kokoa	
2025	You and Idol Precure	Meroron/Meron Tanaka/Cure Kiss	
2025	The Brilliant Healer's New Life in the Shadows	Lily	
2025	Bad Girl	Rura Ruriha	
2025	Harmony of Mille-Feuille	Urū Miyazaki	
2025	Once Upon a Witch's Death	Carbuncle	
2025	I Saved Myself with a Potion!: Life in Another World	Nina	
2025	A Mangaka's Weirdly Wonderful Workplace	Nekonote	
2026	Oh Boy, Was I Wrong About Her	Himeko Kirishima	
2026	Uncle's Obsession with Cute Things	Mirai Usuma	

=== Original net animation ===
Year	Title	Role	Ref.
2022	Hairpin Double	Fumio Chitose/Yellow	

=== Video games ===
Year	Title	Role	Ref.
2017	The Idolmaster Cinderella Girls	Tomoe Murakami	
2018	Irodorimidori	Nadeshiko Igarashi	
2019	Arca Last	Yuna	
2019	Ichi Chi Manji Suguru Online	Tsunadehime	
2019	Sen no Kazoku	Eve	
2019	Tenka Hyakken: Zan	Momijigari Kanemitsu	
2020	Touhou Cannonball	Cirno	
2020	Yasei Shoujo	Taki	
2021	Smile of the Arsnotoria	Meru	
2021	Umamusume: Pretty Derby	Twin Turbo	
2022	GrimGrimoire OnceMore	Margarita Surprise	
2022	Heaven Burns Red	Makiko Asami	
2022	Monster Strike	Taiga Renyan	
2022	Sangokushi Taisen	Da Qiao	
2023	Princess Connect! Re:Dive	Fubuki	
2023	World Dai Star	Xue Wang	
2024	Black Stella Ptolomea	Yukari Teshigawara	

=== Dubbing ===
- Firebuds as Jaden Jones (JeCobi Swain)
