= Aina Suzuki =

Japanese voice actress and singer (born 1995)

- 鈴木 愛奈
- Born: July 23, 1995 (age 31); Chitose, Hokkaido, Japan
- Occupations: Voice actress; singer
- Years active: 2014–present
- Agent: Atrays
- Height: 147 cm (4 ft 10 in)
- Relatives: Miharu Hanai (sister)
- Musical career
- Genres: J-pop; Anison
- Instrument: Vocals
- Years active: 2019–present
- Label: Lantis
- Website: suzukiaina.jp

Aina Suzuki (鈴木 愛奈, Suzuki Aina; born July 23, 1995) is a Japanese voice actress and singer from Hokkaido, affiliated with Atrays. She is known for her roles as Mari Ohara in Love Live! Sunshine!! and Jashin-chan in Dropkick on My Devil!, as well as her activities as a member of the idol group Aqours.

== Career ==
Suzuki had hoped to work in anime since her elementary school days, but thought her voice might not be good enough. A turning point came when, in a third year of high school, she became a finalist (and one of the best three in the nationals) of the 7th All-Japan Anisong Grand Prix. At that time, her desire to become an anisong singer intensified and she made it her goal. She moved to Tokyo as soon as she had graduated from high school. She later revealed that, if she would have won the Anisong Grand Prix, she would have had her major debut the next year (2014) and would have been able to participate in a tournament to be held at the Yokohama Arena; this was revealed in February 2017, after the success of Aqours 1st LoveLive which incidentally had a leg performed in Yokohama Arena.

After arriving in Tokyo, Aina entered the International Media Institute (a voice actor training center associated with IAM Agency). While she had fun in her training and found it rewarding, there were still times when she was unconfident in her vocal abilities. However, after some encouragement from Ryō Horikawa (chief director of the institute) she started to have more confidence. This reignited her desire to become an anisong singer and voice actress after arriving in Tokyo.

She affiliated herself with IAM Agency to learn from both vocalists and voice actors. She made her voice acting debut in 2014. In 2015, she got a role in the Love Live! franchise's then new series, Love Live! Sunshine!! as Mari Ohara, and her activities as a member of Aqours began.

In March 2017, she and the other members of Aqours received a singing award in the 11th Voice Actor Awards.

On January 22, 2020, her solo debut album, 「ring A ring」, was released. She played the role of Kana Hoshisato in the anime series Hatena Illusion, where she also performed the series' ending theme Hikari Iro no Uta (ヒカリイロの歌). She launched her official fanclub, "Ai catwalk", on the same day.

Her younger sister is Miharu Hanai, fellow voice actress under same agency. The relation of the two was officially revealed through announcement of A Journey Through Another World TV animation adaptation.

== Filmography ==
=== Anime television series ===
Year	Title	Role	Source
2014	Akame ga Kill!	Mez	
2015	Castle Town Dandelion	Shiori Sakurada, Mina Shinonome	
2015	YuruYuri San Hai!	Track Club Member A	
2016	Onigiri	Shizuka Gozen	
2016	Three Leaves, Three Colors	Asako Kondō	
2016	Love Live! Sunshine!!	Mari Ohara	
2016	Sweetness and Lightning	Chiyo	
2016	Crane Game Girls	Newscaster	
2016	Crane Game Girls Galaxy	Tokiko	
2017	Clione no Akari	Kaho Ichinose	
2017	Love Live! Sunshine!! 2nd Season	Mari Ohara	
2018	Magical Girl Site	Rina Shioi	
2018	Alice or Alice	Yamirii	
2018	Dropkick on My Devil!	Jashin-chan	
2018	Release the Spyce	Byakko	
2019	Rainy Cocoa side G	Meru	
2019	The Quintessential Quintuplets	Hongō	
2019	Z/X Code reunion	Shuri Kijino	
2020	Hatena Illusion	Kana Hoshisato	
2020	Dropkick on My Devil! Dash	Jashin-chan	
2020	Monster Girl Doctor	Eris	
2020	Iwa-Kakeru! -Sport Climbing Girls-	Sayo Yotsuba	
2021	Don't Toy with Me, Miss Nagatoro	Yoshi	
2021	PuraOre! Pride of Orange	Shino Ukita	
2021	Rumble Garanndoll	Yuki Aoba	
2022	Teppen!!!!!!!!!!!!!!! Laughing 'til You Cry	Mone Ishiya	
2022	Dropkick on My Devil! X	Jashin-chan	
2022	Tokyo Mew Mew New	Miwa Honjō	
2023	Don't Toy with Me, Miss Nagatoro 2nd Attack	Yoshi	
2023	Yohane the Parhelion: Sunshine in the Mirror	Mari	
2024	The Weakest Tamer Began a Journey to Pick Up Trash	Ivy	
2024	Sengoku Youko	Rinzu	
2024	A Journey Through Another World	Allen	
2024	Demon Lord, Retry! R	Luna Elegant	
2025	Once Upon a Witch's Death	Snowy Owl	
2025	The Too-Perfect Saint: Tossed Aside by My Fiancé and Sold to Another Kingdom	Amanda Matilas	
2026	FX Fighter Kurumi-chan	Kurumi Fukuga	

=== OVA/ONA ===
Year	Title	Role	Source
2016	Kaiju Girls	Miclas/Miku Ushimaru	
2018–19	Saint Seiya: Saintia Shō	Equuleus Shō	

=== Film animation ===
Year	Title	Role	Source
2016	Galactic Armored Fleet Majestic Prince: Wings to the Future	Ahn Medikum	
2019	Love Live! Sunshine!! The School Idol Movie: Over the Rainbow	Mari Ohara	

=== Games ===
Year	Title	Role	Source
2015	Onigiri Hyakkiyagyō	Shizuka Gozen	
2015	Princess Maker	Cassandra	
2015	Xuccess Heaven	Isa Kotobuki	
2015	Toys Drive	Mabel Small	
2015	Shooting Girl	Nanami Fuwa, Tekkou M. Misa, Miyo Asato	
2016	Love Live! School Idol Festival	Mari Ohara	
2016	Onigiri: Nihon wo Tabisuru RPG	Shizuka Gozen	
2016	Mon Musume☆wa〜Remu	Micuras	
2016	Megami Meguri	Konohana Sakuyahime	
2016	Magic Library Qurare	Dr. Moreau	
2016	Girls' Frontline	Luger P08 Handgun	
2017	Knights Chronicle	Lena, Olive, Meril	
2017	Q & Q Answers	Wizard of Oz	
2017	Yuki Yuna is a Hero Hana Yui no Kirameki	Kōri Chikage	
2018	Grand Chase: Dimensional Chaser	Lime Serenity	
2018	Granblue Fantasy: Love Live! Sunshine!! Aqours Sky-High!	Mari Ohara	
2019	Tenka San Bun	Princess Cai Yan	
2019	Shadowverse CCG	Mari Ohara	
2019	Ys IX: Monstrum Nox	Anemona / Doll	
2019	Love Live! School Idol Festival All Stars	Mari Ohara	
2022	Azur Lane	IJN Sakawa	
2023	Yohane the Parhelion: Blaze in the Deepblue	Mari	

=== Drama CD ===
Year	Title	Role	Source
2015	Shiden Aratame no Maki	Kabosu	
2015	Saint Seiya Seintia Shō	Shoko	
2016	Nogi Wakaba wa Yūsha de Aru Vol. 1	Kōri Chikage	
2016	Nogi Wakaba wa Yūsha de Aru Vol. 2	Kōri Chikage	
2016	Joshi Shōgakusei wa Hajimemashita P!	Riri	

=== Digital comic ===
Year	Title	Role	Source
2015	Shitsuren Chocolatier	Matsuri Koyurugi	

=== Web radio ===
Title	Station	Date Aired	Source
New Gin Group Presents MAO to Suzuki	JOQR Chō! A&G+	April 3, 2016 – April 4, 2017	
Yumiri to Aina no Mogumogu Communications	Onsen	April 8, 2016–present	
A&G Girls Beat Queenty	Chō! A&G+	April 9, 2016 – September 25, 2017	

== Discography ==
=== Studio albums ===
Year	Album details	Catalog no.	Oricon chart
2020	ring A ring: "Hikari Iro no Uta" (ヒカリイロの歌) was used for Hatena Illusion ending theme; Released: 22 January 2020; Label: Lantis	LACA-15808	5
2021	Belle révolte: Released: 1 December 2021; Label: Lantis	LACA-35918	15

=== Singles ===
Year	Song	Catalog no.	Oricon chart	Album
2020	Yasashisa no Namae (やさしさの名前): Monster Girl Doctor ending theme; Released: 16 September 2020; Label: Lantis	LACM-24021		Belle révolte
2020	Motto Takaku (もっと高く): Iwa-Kakeru! -Climbing Girls- opening theme; Released: 18 November 2020; Label: Lantis	LACM-24063		Belle révolte
2021	Etonyanran (えとにゃんらん): Etotama ~Nyan Kyaku Banrai~ theme song digital single; Released: 28 April 2021; Label: Lantis	LZC-1870		TBA
