= Once Upon a Witch's Death =

Japanese light novel series and its adaptations

- First light novel volume cover

ある魔女が死ぬまで (Aru Majo ga Shinu Made)
- Genre: Drama; Supernatural; Slice of life
- Novel series
- Written by: Saka
- Published by: Kakuyomu
- Original run: October 3, 2019 – August 26, 2022
- Light novel
- Written by: Saka
- Illustrated by: Chorefuji
- Published by: ASCII Media Works
- English publisher: NA: Yen Press
- Imprint: Dengeki no Shin Bungei
- Original run: December 17, 2021 – September 17, 2025
- Volumes: 4
- Manga
- Written by: Saka
- Illustrated by: Kenu Amearare
- Published by: ASCII Media Works
- English publisher: NA: Kadokawa
- Imprint: Dengeki Comics NEXT
- Magazine: Dengeki Comic Regulus
- Original run: March 10, 2023 – present
- Volumes: 5
- Anime television series
- Directed by: Atsushi Nigorikawa
- Written by: Keiichirō Ōchi
- Music by: Akiyuki Tateyama
- Studio: EMT Squared
- Licensed by: Crunchyroll
- Original network: AT-X, Tokyo MX, SUN, KBS Kyoto, BS11
- Original run: April 1, 2025 – June 17, 2025
- Episodes: 12
- icon

Once Upon a Witch's Death (Japanese: ある魔女が死ぬまで, Hepburn: Aru Majo ga Shinu Made) is a Japanese light novel series written by Saka and illustrated by Chorefuji. It was serialized as a web novel published on Kakuyomu from October 2019 to August 2022. It was later acquired by ASCII Media Works who began publishing it under their Dengeki no Shin Bungei light novel imprint in December 2021. A manga adaptation illustrated by Kenu Amearare began serialization on ASCII Media Works' Dengeki Comic Regulus manga website in March 2023. An anime television series adaptation produced by EMT Squared aired from April to June 2025.

== Plot ==
Meg Raspberry is a young apprentice witch raised by her teacher Faust, the Eternal Witch. On Meg's 17th birthday, Faust reveals that Meg is afflicted with a curse that will cause her to age rapidly and die shortly after turning eighteen. Faust tells her there is only one way to survive: Meg must create a "Seed of Life" by collecting a thousand human tears shed from genuine joy, all within a single year. Faced with an seemingly impossible task, Meg sets out on a journey beyond her sheltered life, using magic to help others and becoming involved in their personal struggles and happiness.

== Characters ==
Meg Raspberry (メグ・ラズベリー, Megu Razuberī)
Voiced by: Yoshino Aoyama (Japanese); Hannah Alyea (English)
Faust (ファウスト, Fausuto)
Voiced by: Yoshiko Sakakibara (Japanese); Linda Young (English)
Carbuncle (カーバンクル, Kābankuru)
Voiced by: Miharu Hanai (Japanese); Corinne Sudberg (English)
Snowy Owl (シロフクロウ, Shirofukurō)
Voiced by: Aina Suzuki (Japanese); Naya Moreno (English)
Fine Cavendish (フィーネ・キャベンディッシュ, Fīne Kyabendisshu)
Voiced by: Rumi Okubo (Japanese); Reshel Mae (English)
Sophie Hayter (ソフィ・ヘイター, Sofi Heitā)
Voiced by: Hina Yōmiya (Japanese); Abigail Blythe (English)
Mysterious Girl (謎の少女, Nazo no Shōjo)
Voiced by: Atsumi Tanezaki
Inori (祈)
Voiced by: Shizuka Itō (Japanese); Marwa Elda (English)
Eldora (エルドラ, Erudora)
Voiced by: Yoko Hikasa

== Media ==
=== Light novel ===
Written by Saka, Once Upon a Witch's Death was serialized as a web novel published on the Kakuyomu website from October 3, 2019, to August 26, 2022. It was later acquired by ASCII Media Works who began publishing it as a light novel with illustrations by Chorefuji under their Dengeki no Shin Bungei light novel imprint from December 17, 2021, to September 17, 2025. Four volumes have been released as of September 2025. The light novel is licensed in English by Yen Press.

No.	Title	Original release date	English release date
1	The Tale of the One Thousand Tears of Joy; Owari no Kotoba to Hajimari no Namida (終わりの言葉と始まりの涙)	December 17, 2021; 978-4-04-914054-5	April 30, 2024; 978-1-9753-7998-8
2	Celebration Rings Over Crystal Waters; Aoki Umi ni Shukufuku no Kane wa Narihibiku (蒼き海に祝福の鐘は鳴り響く)	July 17, 2024; 978-4-04-915566-2	January 27, 2026; 979-8-8554-2447-8
3	The Curtain Rises on a Neverending Story; Hate Shinai Monogatari no Maku ga Agaru (はてしない物語の幕が上がる)	March 17, 2025; 978-4-04-915567-9	June 9, 2026; 979-8-8554-2793-6
4	始まりの世界と希望の魔女	September 17, 2025; 978-4-04-915568-6	—

=== Manga ===
A manga adaptation illustrated by Kenu Amearare began serialization on ASCII Media Works' Dengeki Comic Regulus manga website on March 10, 2023. The manga's chapters have been compiled into five tankōbon volumes as of December 2025. The manga adaptation is published digitally in English on Kadokawa's BookWalker website. In August 2025, Yen Press announced that they had also licensed the manga for English publication beginning in February 2026.

No.	Original release date	Original ISBN	North American release date	North American ISBN
1	July 27, 2023	978-4-04-915154-1	February 24, 2026	979-8-8554-3024-0
2	July 26, 2024	978-4-04-915822-9	July 28, 2026	979-8-8554-3026-4
3	September 27, 2024	978-4-04-915932-5	December 15, 2026	979-8-8554-3028-8
4	April 10, 2025	978-4-04-916367-4	—	—
5	December 27, 2025	978-4-04-916861-7	—	—

=== Anime ===
An anime television series adaptation was announced on June 28, 2024. It is produced by EMT Squared and directed by Atsushi Nigorikawa, with Keiichirō Ōchi overseeing series scripts, Yuki Shizuku designing the characters, and Akiyuki Tateyama and composing the music. The series aired from April 1 to June 17, 2025, on AT-X and other networks. The opening theme song is "Drops", performed by Maaya Sakamoto, while the ending theme song is "Hana-saku Michi de" (花咲く道で; On the Road Where the Flowers Bloom), performed by Aoi Teshima and composed by Yuki Kajiura. Crunchyroll streams the series.

==== Episodes ====
No.	Title	Directed by	Written by	Storyboarded by	Original release date
1	"The Witch With One Year to Live"; Transliteration: "Yomei Ichi-nen no Majo" (Japanese: 余命一年の魔女)	Atsushi Nigorikawa	Keiichirō Ōchi	Atsushi Nigorikawa	April 1, 2025
Apprentice witch Meg Raspberry turns 17 and her master, Ms Faust of the Seven Sages, bluntly informs her Meg will die in one year from the curse Death Sentence. Once she turns 18 the spell will increase the speed at which she ages, causing her to die of old age within a few weeks. The only cure is to collect tears of joy from 1000 people in a special bottle which can be used to create a Seed of Life and grant Meg immortality. Meg goes to sulk by the river and meets Anna, a young girl whose mother Iris died recently, and offers to help find Iris' favourite pink flowers to lay on her grave. Anna's father Dr Hendy is unsure which species of flower is the right one. He shows Meg pictures of when he and Iris visited the Far East and pink snow fell from the sky in summer. Meg realises the snow was Yoshino Cherry Blossoms, so she uses magic to create a temporary illusion of cherry trees. The bottle automatically collects two tears from Hendy and Anna. Meg ends up promising Anna that one day she will be an even greater witch than Faust. She returns to Faust, determined to collect 1000 tears and defeat her curse.
2	"The Apprentice Witch and the People of Lapis"; Transliteration: "Minarai Majo to Rapisu no Hitobito" (Japanese: 見習い魔女とラピスの人々)	Naoya Murakawa	Keiichirō Ōchi	Atsushi Nigorikawa	April 8, 2025
Meg realises that in order to collect 1000 tears in one year she must collect at least three every day, plus the tears from Anna and Hendy cannot be used as they are a mixture of joy and sadness. Her friend Fine visits hoping Faust can repair her wristwatch. Faust diagnoses the Fairy powering the watch has grown weak and sends her to Zepeto, a watchmaker. Meg suggests Fine buy a modern watch, but Fine refuses as it belonged to her deceased grandfather. Zepeto informs them the fairy has died. Meg frees the fairy's spirit back into the cosmos so it might be reborn into another useful object. Meg visits the elderly Granny Flare and sees her enshrouded by black mist, a sign of the Reaper. Meg wants to save her but Faust reminds her saving herself from a curse and saving someone from old age are two very different things, and that witches should not interfere with fate. Meg stubbornly visits Flare hoping to save her, but makes no progress. Eventually, Meg accepts some fates cannot be changed so she seeks out Flare's son Ed, who often forgets to visit due to work, and reminds him to visit Flare with his wife and young daughter Lily. Flare spends the afternoon with her family before quietly passing away. Faust is proud Meg made Flare's final moments happy. Meg's bottle collects Flare's final tear of joy.
3	"Wisdom Visits From the East"; Transliteration: "Azuma Yori, Eichi no Raihō" (Japanese: 東より、英知の来訪)	Maezono Fumio	Keiichiro Ochi	Hakaya Shikika	April 15, 2025
Faust travels to North America and Meg is abruptly visited by Inori, Sage of Wisdom, who explains Faust is investigating damage to the environment, so Inori has agreed to keep an eye on Meg. Inori explains humans are damaging the environment and want witches to somehow fix it with magic, though the damage might be irreversible already. Deciding she likes her, Inori asks Meg to become her assistant after her apprenticeship with Faust ends so they can create new medicines. Meg is reluctant and explains about her curse and that the difficulty in collecting the tears has left her unsure how to keep going. Just saying this out loud causes Meg to realise she has been mentally preparing herself for death instead of survival. Inori temporarily darkens the moon, allowing Meg to see a nearby meteor shower. Meg realises the universe, and magic itself, is unlimited in its potential and decides she wants to live. Faust returns and finds it amusing Meg and Inori are already acting like sisters. Several weeks later the Otherworld Festival arrives, with Faust chosen to open the portal to the Other World so visitors can interact with other worldly beings. Unfortunately Faust injures her back but cannot afford to miss the festival, since opening the portal every year consumes the wild magic causing problems to the environment. To ensure the portal is opened Faust summons Sage Sophie Hayter, whom Meg is jealous of due to already becoming a Sage despite being the same age as her.
4	"Blessings With the Opening of the Gate"; Transliteration: "Shukufuku wa Kaimon to Tomoni" (Japanese: 祝福は開門と共に)	Yuki Tsunohara	Takashi Aoshima	Daiki Maezawa	April 22, 2025
Faust hopes Meg will learn from Sophie. Meg realises Sophie dislikes her own red eyes. Sophie is curious Meg has not chosen a nickname, yet when she sees the townspeople only refer to Meg as Faust's Apprentice, she infers it is because Meg has not done anything to earn recognition. She asks why Meg bothers to study magic without a clear goal; seemingly happy to remain Faust's anonymous apprentice. Sophie abruptly admits her goal is the eradication of magic. Meg struggles to understand, until Faust explains Sophie was born in a country where her magic plus red eyes were seen as the work of the devil. Eventually she was taken from her parents at age 5, giving her little opportunity to connect with other people. As such she has spent years using magic to make others happy, hence her nickname Sage of Blessings. Meg feels uncertain when Sophie alters Faust's spell to make the gate larger so more spirits can visit the townspeople. On the day of the festival Sophie activates the portal, but due to its larger size a dangerous spirit tries to force its way in and Meg rushes to defend the townspeople. To the townspeople, who could not see the spirit, it merely looked like Meg used magic to create a display of multi-coloured raindrops, which they enthusiastically applaud. Sophie is glad everyone ended up happy and realises Meg might just be her first friend.
5	"Flowers Blooming in the Festival Night Sky"; Transliteration: "Saiten no Yozora ni Hana wa Saku" (Japanese: 祭典の夜空に花は咲く)	Mikan	Takashi Aoshima	Atsushi Nigorikawa	April 29, 2025
Faust puts Meg and Sophie in charge of the parade on the last day of the festival. They encounter a woman named Marie hoping to meet the kind man named Woof in the hooded jacket she met at the previous year's festival so they can watch the fireworks. Meg remembers the firework display has been cancelled so she decides to find Woof. By chance she finds him on her first try and discovers he is a wolfman from the other side of the portal. After convincing him Marie wouldn't be scared to know he is a wolfman he agrees to meet her. Meg figures out how to make fireworks from magic. Sophie deduces Meg needs tears of joy so Meg admits to being cursed. Sophie blames magic, but Meg remains grateful that magic lets her help people. Woof goes to meet Marie while Meg puts on her firework display. With the festival over the spirits return home and the portal closes. The next day they discover Woof didn't return home as he and Marie have decided to marry. To ensure Woof can stay permanently Sophie casts a spell turning him into Marie's familiar. Two more tears are added to Meg's bottle bringing her total to six. Sophie departs, claiming she still dislikes magic but intends to use it to prevent Meg's death.
6	"An Evening Sky Without Magic"; Transliteration: "Mahō no Nai Yūgure no Sora wa" (Japanese: 魔法のない夕暮れの空は)	Maezono Fumio	Keiichiro Ochi	Kenichi Hamasaki & Takaaki Ishiyama	May 6, 2025
Meg collects a total of 40 tears of joy and 10 that are mixtures of emotions and of no use. She claims she can now identify which people are most likely to cry tears of joy. Faust is disappointed and bans Meg from using magic. Meg admits to Fine she has been targeting women, children and salary-men, since they are the likeliest to cry when shown kindness. Fine is disappointed Meg has stopped treasuring each individual tear. Meg walks around town sulking and finds herself being thanked for her help by people she can't remember. A young mother stops to chat with her, grateful for the help Meg provided, but Meg can't remember her name and is forced to improvise their conversation. Eventually she remembers repairing a watch the woman's baby had broken, a gift from her husband's deceased mother. Meg realises she has been acting terribly, manipulating people into giving her tears, all while convincing herself she was helping them. Realising she needs to be better she helps an elderly woman climb some stairs without resorting to magic or expecting a tear in return. From her, Meg learns she has helped so many people they have begun calling her the Witch of Lapis. Faust is proud of her for earning a true witches nickname, one given to her by the entire town of Lapis in gratitude and love.
7	"Words and Disaster and Ceremony"; Transliteration: "Kotonoha to Saiyaku to Shikiten to" (Japanese: 言の葉と災厄と式典と)	Kohei Kawai	Takashi Aoshima	Daiki Maezawa	May 13, 2025
As Meg goes around town convincing the locals to refer to her as The Witch of Lapis, she encounters Sophie who informs her of a festival held every 20 years. Sophie invites Meg, with the hopes of learning more about her curse there. Upon arrival, Sophie is immediately swamped by reporters telling Meg to go ahead without her. Meg soon encounters a little girl who lost her servant, and the pair began enjoying the festival together. However, she has a run-in with a powerful Witch named Eldora- the Witch of Demise- who informs Meg that if she lifts her curse, something important to her will be lost. Later at a presentation, the Council's Chairman, along with Faust and Eldora, introduce the Planet's Core Project. The Project is to have Earth's Core resonate with an artificial core made from magic ore to prevent Earth from losing its connection to the magic world. After the presentation, the little girl is revealed to be Chloe, the Witch of Words, and a Half-Human Half-Spirit. Her assistant is nothing more than a body double to keep Chloe's true identity a secret. After the festival ends, Meg realizes she never spoke to Eldora about her curse, but looks forward to another fulfilling year.
8	"The Family Bewitched by a Devil"; Transliteration: "Akuma ni Mīrareta Kazoku" (Japanese: 悪魔に魅入られた家族)	Shigenori Awai	Keiichirō Ōchi	Satomi Kondo	May 20, 2025
Due to the Planet Core Project Meg has no time to collect tears. Meg spots a magic scar on a girl named Mary. Faust reveals a fanatic offered Mary as a sacrifice to the devil. Despite her sympathy Faust forbids Meg from trying to help as devil magic is simply too dangerous. Meg learns Mary’s mother Jill has the same scar, confirming the fanatic is Mary’s father Ted. Sneaking into Faust’s library Meg learns Ted must have built an altar of sacrifice, so she plans to destroy it. A devil face suddenly confronts her before disappearing; confirming Ted’s devil knows she is trying to interfere. Meg locates Ted’s secret basement, only to be hit on the head and tied up with Mary and Jill. Ted reveals he made the sacrifice because he couldn’t handle his miserable life anymore, so he sacrificed his family to be free of them and plans to use the devil’s power to get revenge on everyone he hates. Meg is suddenly rescued by Faust who banishes the devil and Ted to Hell at the cost of her left thumb. Jill decides to move away and start a new life with Mary. Faust warns Meg that as a witch she may have to face greater dangers than devils and make impossible choices, so it is vital she always try to do the right thing.
9	"The Old Giant Tree Sleeps"; Transliteration: "Furuki Taiju wa Nemuru" (Japanese: 古き大樹は眠る)	Natsumi Higashida	Keiichirō Ōchi	Natsumi Higashida	May 27, 2025
Meg realises she only has 7 months left. The mayor asks her to investigate Lapis’ sacred oak, infected with magic. Inori reports similar trees have created huge deserts where no plants grow. The only solution is turning the infectious magic into fire magic to burn it down. Meg catches a child in the branches who reveals she is the tree’s spirit. She asks to walk around town, which she has protected for 300 years. Meg names the spirit Serena. Serena reveals she misses Flaire, who would often visit her tree. Meg recalls the time she made an illusion of cherry blossoms. Serena suddenly disappears. Meg searches for her, knowing if Inori burns the tree before freeing Serena back to the cosmos she will never be reborn as another tree. She finds Serena mutated into a monster and the tree goes mad. Meg rushes to save Serena, but the tree breaks her leg. Unable to move, Meg activates the fire spell, for which Serena thanks her. Inori and Faust help Meg recover and Inori shows Meg that instead of a fire spell she somehow turned the infectious magic into a reincarnation spell and Serena’s tree instantly became a cherry blossom tree, earning Meg a place in magical history. Faust warns her the spell could be used to heal the world’s damaged ecosystem, so she needs to prepare herself for that difficult future.
10	"The Bells of Blessing Ring With the Sound of the Waves (Part 1)"; Transliteration: "Shiosai Totomoni Shukufuku no Kane wa Naru (Zenpen)" (Japanese: 潮騒と共に祝福の鐘は鳴る(前編))	Hideki Tonkatsu	Takashi Aoshima	Mori Takeshi	June 3, 2025
Inori takes Meg to see Jack, the Sage of Life, in Aquamarine medical research city that contains a Magic Bell forged by Aquamarine's guardian witch Tethys millennia ago. The Hospital Director reveals Faust brought Meg to the hospital as a baby suffering from magical contamination, the only survivor of a magical disaster. Meg decides to find out where she came from one day. Meg encounters Mary and Jill, who now works at her parents' café. Her father collapses but is quickly treated by Jack, plus his daughter Coco who works with Jill. Jack asks Meg to help his research into removing magical contamination, as she did with Serena's tree. Meg agrees, hoping helping people will generate some joyful tears. Coco reveals her mother died of magical contamination. After examining her Jack deduces Meg's body was altered by the magical contamination, giving her magic eyes and possibly causing her Death Sentence curse as well. Jack asks Meg to try curing a boy suffering from terminal contamination that mutated him into a monster. Over a week Meg has her leg treated and practices her spell on contaminated mice. Meg realises there are symbols all over the city carved by Tethys which help the bell protect Aquamarine from tsunami's. Sophie has the suspicious feeling she has seen the symbols before.
11	"The Bells of Blessing Ring With the Sound of the Waves (Part 2)"; Transliteration: "Shiosai Totomoni Shukufuku no Kane wa Naru (Kōhen)" (Japanese: 潮騒と共に祝福の鐘は鳴る(後編))	Takanari Hirayama	Takashi Aoshima	Masakazu Amiya	June 10, 2025
Meg wonders if the purification spell only worked on Serena because they both wanted to protect Lapis. This causes Jack to realise that modern magic relies on spells, but in the past magicians used emotions, though the effects were unreliable. The sick boy, Sierra, begins to deteriorate and Meg insists they try Jack's emotions over his wife's death. Meg, Jack, Inori and Sophie successfully cure Sierra, though he grows cat ears as a side-effect. Chloe suddenly announces a magical disaster has caused another tsunami. Sophie regrets they can't use Tethys' bell as it no longer works. Inori orders Aquamarine evacuated, but expects the city to be destroyed along with most of the citizens. A voice suddenly draws Meg towards the bell tower where she realises why the bell can no longer be rung. As a witch from thousands of years ago, Tethys would have used emotion magic, while the symbols she carved only directed the magic making it more reliable. Sensing the love Tethys had for Aquamarine, Meg throws all her emotion into the bell which rings for the first time in centuries and diverts the tsunami with an impenetrable barrier. Sophie cries to see Meg has survived, adding a tear to Meg's collection. For her heroism, Jack swears he will find a cure for her curse, as her departure is watched by Tethys' spirit on the way back to Lapis.
12	"The People I Love"; Transliteration: "Watashi no Aishita Hito-tachi" (Japanese: 私の愛した人たち)	Atsushi Nigorikawa	Keiichirō Ōchi	Takaaki Ishiyama	June 17, 2025
Somehow Meg dreams of the disaster that killed her mother, despite being a baby at the time. Eldora visits Faust who reveals she adopted Eldora as a child and trained her as a witch. As the artificial core is almost ready Faust had asked Eldora to visit one last time, since Eldora was chosen to use the core to purify the planet, taking at least 20 years. Meg continues to dream of her mother's death and remembers Eldora was there. Awakening, she accuses Eldora of causing the disaster. Eldora admits she destroyed the country as revenge for what happened to her real family, Faust adopting Meg afterwards as one of the only survivors. Eldora leaves after asking Meg to kill her if she ever makes such a huge mistake again. Meg is able to discover Eldora destroyed Orlov, a military dictatorship that persecuted all magic-users as a threat to its military superiority, risking a third world war. Eldora became known as the Witch of Demise despite having spared the rest of the world from war. Despite her reluctance, Faust allows Meg to visit Orlov to learn about her past. The Council of Magic also asks Meg to report anything she learns about other countries affected by disasters. After emotional goodbyes with everyone Meg departs, determined to discover her past and continue collecting tears of joy everywhere she goes.
