= Harmony of Mille-Feuille =

Japanese mixed-media project

- Anime key visual

うたごえはミルフィーユ (Utagoe wa Mirufīyu)
- Created by: Pony Canyon; Takuya Yamanaka
- Anime television series
- Directed by: Kiyoto Nakajima (Note: Although Takuya Satō is credited as Chief Director (総監督) on the official website and in promotional material; in the opening credits to the series, he's credited solely as Creative Advisor (クリエイティヴアドバイザー).)
- Written by: Takuya Yamanaka
- Music by: Shun Narita
- Studio: Jumondou
- Licensed by: SEA: Plus Media Networks Asia
- Original network: Tokyo MX, BS Fuji
- Original run: July 17, 2025 – September 18, 2025
- Episodes: 10

Harmony of Mille-Feuille (うたごえはミルフィーユ, Utagoe wa Mirufīyu; "A Singing Voice Is a Mille-Feuille") is a Japanese music-themed mixed-media project featuring themes of a cappella, high school girls and complex created by Pony Canyon and Takuya Yamanaka that began in April 2022. An anime television series adaptation produced by Jumondou aired from July to September 2025.

== Characters ==
=== Te to Te (formerly Temarizawa High School a cappella club) ===
Uta Komaki (小牧嬉歌, Komaki Uta)
Voiced by: Mirai Ayase
Musubu Mayumori (繭森結, Mayumori Musubu)
Voiced by: Yūko Natsuyoshi
Airi Kojō (古城愛莉, Kojō Airi)
Voiced by: Kanoko Sudō
Rei "Reirei" Konoe (近衛玲音, Konoe Rei)
Voiced by: Misato Matsuoka
Urū "Ururu" Miyazaki (宮崎閏, Miyazaki Urū)
Voiced by: Miharu Hanai
Yako "Kuma-chan" Kumai (熊井弥子, Kumai Yako)
Voiced by: Haruka Aikawa

=== Parabola ===
Mizuki Fujishiro (藤代聖, Fujishiro Mizuki)
Voiced by: Moeka Koizumi
Zoe Delaunay (ゾーイ・デルニ, Zōi Deruni)
Voiced by: Asaka
Kikka Sengoku (仙石喜歌, Sengoku Kikka)
Voiced by: Nao Tōyama
Reira Tamaki (環木鈴蘭, Tamaki Reira)
Voiced by: Yoshino Aoyama
Karin Minami (南佳凛, Minami Karin)
Voiced by: Kiyozo

=== Other characters ===
Sayaka Iguchi (井口紗弥香, Iguchi Sayaka)
Voiced by: Iori Saeki
Uta's mother (ウタの母, Uta no Haha)
Voiced by: Mayumi Shintani
Musubu's mother (ムスブの母, Musubu no Haha)
Voiced by: Kaori Nazuka

== Other media ==
=== Anime ===
An anime adaptation was announced during the first event for the project on June 17, 2023. It was later revealed to be a television series produced by Jumondou and directed by Kiyoto Nakajima, with series composition and episode scripts by Takuya Yamanaka, Chisato Kikunaga and Hitomi Kaiho designing the characters, and Shun Narita composing the music. The series aired from July 17 to September 18, 2025, on Tokyo MX and BS Fuji. The opening theme song is "Omoidebanashi" (思い出話; Nostalgic Talk), performed by the main cast. Plus Media Networks Asia licensed the series in Southeast Asia and broadcasts it on Aniplus Asia.

==== Episodes ====
| No. | Title | Directed by (Note: Production staff information is taken from the ending credits of each episode.) | Written by | Storyboarded by | Original release date |
|---|---|---|---|---|---|
| 1 | "Pop Music Debut!?"; Transliteration: "Karune Debyū! ?" (Japanese: 軽音デビュー！？) | Chen Fengyu & Luo Juntian | Takuya Yamanaka | Koichi Ohata & Minoru Yamaoka | July 17, 2025 |
| 2 | "Ururun TV"; Transliteration: "Ururun TV" (Japanese: ウルルンTV) | Chen Fengyu & Xie Liheng | Takuya Yamanaka | Hong Heon-pyo | July 24, 2025 |
| 3 | "The Worst"; Transliteration: "Sai Akuda" (Japanese: さいあくだ) | Kim Myeong-gun | Takuya Yamanaka | Nobuaki Nakanishi & Hong Heon-pyo | July 31, 2025 |
| 4 | "Call It a Hunch"; Transliteration: "Yokan ga Shita Kara" (Japanese: 予感がしたから) | Xie Liheng & Luo Juntian | Takuya Yamanaka | Hong Heon-pyo | August 7, 2025 |
| 5 | "Summer Cacophony"; Transliteration: "Natsu no Hajimari no Kakofonyi" (Japanese: 夏の始まりのカコフォニィ) | Masahiko Watanabe | Takuya Satō | KEI | August 14, 2025 |
| 6 | "Our A Cappella"; Transliteration: "Watashi-tachi no Akapera" (Japanese: わたしたちのアカペラ) | Shunji Yoshida & Michiyo Sugawara | Takuya Yamanaka | Minoru Yamaoka | August 21, 2025 |
| 7 | "Things That Change"; Transliteration: "Kawatte Iku Mono" (Japanese: 変わっていくもの) | Kim Myeong-gun & Michiyo Sogawara | Takuya Yamanaka | Hong Heon-pyo | August 28, 2025 |
| 8 | "Parabola"; Transliteration: "Hōbutsusen" (Japanese: 放物線) | Chen Fengyu & Kiyoto Nakajima | Takuya Yamanaka | Ryoji Fujiwara | September 4, 2025 |
| 9 | "Harmony of Mille-Feuille"; Transliteration: "Utagoe wa Mirufīyu" (Japanese: うたごえはミルフィーユ) | Masahiko Watanabe | Takuya Yamanaka | Nobuaki Nakanishi | September 11, 2025 |
| 10 | "Hands Together"; Transliteration: "Te to Te" (Japanese: 手と手) | Kiyoto Nakajima & Xie Liheng | Takuya Yamanaka | Hong Heon-pyo | September 18, 2025 |
