= Himitsu no AiPri The Movie: Full Bloom Buzzlume Live! =

2026 film by Kentarō Yamaguchi

- Theatrical release poster
- Japanese: 映画ひみつのアイプリ まんかいバズリウムライブ！
- Revised Hepburn: Eiga Himitsu no AiPuri Mankai Bazuriumu Raibu!
- Directed by: Kentarō Yamaguchi
- Screenplay by: Gigaemon Ichikawa
- Based on: Himitsu no AiPri by T-Arts and Syn Sophia
- Starring: Minori Fujidera; Sae Hiratsuka; Yurika Kubo; Yuriko Hibi; Anna Suzuki; Sora Tokui; Misaki Watada; Yō Taichi
- Music by: Izumi Mori
- Production companies: OLM Division 1; DongWoo A&E
- Distributed by: Avex Pictures
- Release date: March 13, 2026
- Running time: 68 minutes
- Country: Japan
- Language: Japanese

Himitsu no AiPri The Movie: Full Bloom Buzzlume Live! (Japanese: 映画ひみつのアイプリ まんかいバズリウムライブ！, Hepburn: Eiga Himitsu no AiPuri Mankai Bazuriumu Raibu!) is a 2026 Japanese animated musical film directed by Kentarō Yamaguchi and written by Gigaemon Ichikawa; the film is based on the anime series of the same name by OLM Division 1 and DongWoo A&E, distributed by Avex Pictures, it is the first film for the Himitsu no AiPri series, as well as the seventh film in the PrettySeries franchise overall; it focuses on Princess Ring Clover inviting to all the AiPris to competing in the “Spring Float Race”. The film stars the voices of Minori Fujidera, Sae Hiratsuka, Yurika Kubo, Yuriko Hibi, Anna Suzuki, Sora Tokui, Misaki Watada, Yō Taichi. It was released in Japan on March 13, 2026.

== Voice cast ==
- Minori Fujidera as Himari Aozora / Aoi Yumemiya (cameo)
- Sae Hiratsuka as Mitsuki Hoshiwaka
- Yurika Kubo as Tsumugi Suzukaze
- Yuriko Hibi as Sakura Ichijoji
- Anna Suzuki as Tamaki Nikaido
- Sora Tokui as Airi Mitsuba
- Misaki Watada as Rinrin Shinomiya
- Yō Taichi as Chii Mamiya
- Rio Tsuchiya as Juria Higarashu
- Rina Kawaguchi as Eru Rokudo
- Momoka Terasawa as Vivi Hachioji
- Tatsuyaki Kobayashi as Subaru Nanaura
- Kirara Ōmori as Otome Nanaura
- Eri Kitamura as Princess Ring / Nagisa Saitō as Wako Sarashina
- Kanae Ito as Meganee Akai
- Shōtarō Morikubo as Mc Imuu
- Hanaka Ogawa as Inori Konomi (Cameo)

== Production ==
It was first announced on November 29, 2025.

== Release ==
The film was released in theaters in Japan on March 13, 2026.

== Reception ==
=== Box office ===
The film failed to make it to the top 10 in the Japanese box office, but it reached top 2 at Aeon Cinema Ebina before its closure on March 17, 2026, and top 6 at CinemaCity during its first opening weekend.
