= List of Himitsu no AiPri episodes =

- No. of episodes: 102

Release
- Original network: TV Tokyo
- Original release: April 7, 2024 – March 29, 2026

Season chronology
- ← Previous; Waccha PriMagi! Next → Onegai AiPri

This is a list of episodes for the Japanese anime television series Himitsu no AiPri. The first and second opening theme songs of Season 1 are "Full Power Girl Revolution!" (ぜんりょくじょしかくめい!, Zenryoku Joshi Kakumei!) and "Icchokusen Daisakusen!" (いっちょくせんだいさくせん！) by Pmarusama while the ending themes are "It's a Secret, but..." (ひみつだけどね, Himitsu Dakedo Ne) and "AiPri Verse In!" (アイプリバースイン!, AiPuri Basu In!), both performed by Minori Fujidera and Sae Hiratsuka. The opening theme songs of Season 2 are "Ring Ring Ring feat. Himari" (Ｒｉｎｇ Ｒｉｎｇ Ｒｉｎｇ ｆｅａｔ. ひまり) by Pmarusama and Himari (Minori) and "Heart-pounding Sparkling Buzzlume" (どどきどききらめきバズリウム, Doki-doki Kirameki Bazuryumu) by Pmarusama while the ending themes are "Secret FuFuFu" (ひみつのふふふ, Himitsu no Fufufu) and "Cinderella Lalala" (シンデレラのラララ♡, Shinderera no Rarara) by Chō Tokimeki Sendenbu.

== Episode list ==
=== Season 1: Secret Arc (2024-25) ===
No.	Title	Written by (Note: Information is taken from the ending credits of each episode.)	Storyboard by	Original release date
1	"Himari's AiPri Debut!"; Transliteration: "Himari no Aipuri Debyū!" (Japanese: ひまりのアイプリデビュー！)	Gigaemon Ichikawa	Kentarō Yamaguchi	April 7, 2024
2	"Mitsuki's Secret Promise"; Transliteration: "Mitsuki no Himitsu no Yakusoku" (Japanese: みつきのひみつの約束)	Gigaemon Ichikawa	Junichi Fujisaku	April 14, 2024
3	"The Student Council's Secret Lesson"; Transliteration: "Seito-kai no Himitsu no Ressun" (Japanese: 生徒会のひみつのレッスン)	Yumi Suzumori	Masaki Ōzora	April 21, 2024
4	"Heart-pounding! First Visit Day"; Transliteration: "Dokidoki! Hajimete no Sankan-bi" (Japanese: ドキドキ！初めての参観日)	Natsu Yoshioka	Meigo Naitō	April 28, 2024
5	"Shiny Cleaning Showdown"; Transliteration: "Pikapika☆Osōji Taiketsu" (Japanese: ピカピカ☆おそうじ対決)	Yūsuke Shiratori	Wataru Nakagawa	May 5, 2024
6	"Challenge! AiPri Grand Prix"; Transliteration: "Chõsen! Aipuri Guran Puri" (Japanese: 挑戦！アイプリグランプリ)	Gigaemon Ichikawa	Junichi Fujisaku	May 12, 2024
7	"Victoria's Secret"; Transliteration: "Vikutoria no Himitsu" (Japanese: ヴィクトリアのひみつ)	Junichi Fujisaku	Masaki Ōzora	May 19, 2024
8	"The Classmate's Secret"; Transliteration: "Kurasumeito no Himitsu" (Japanese: クラスメイトのひみつ)	Maika Shizuhara	Meigo Naitō	May 26, 2024
9	"Formation! AiPri Detectives"; Transliteration: "Kessei! Aipuri Tanteidan" (Japanese: 結成！アイプリ探偵団)	Yumi Suzumori	Natsuki Takemura	June 2, 2024
10	"Mitsuki's Rival Appears!"; Transliteration: "Mitsuki No Raibaru Tõjõ" (Japanese: みつきのライバル登場)	Natsu Yoshioka	Hiroyuki Fukushima	June 9, 2024
11	"Neko Neko! The Great Secret Search"; Transliteration: "Neko Neko! Himitsu no Dai Sōsaku" (Japanese: ねこねこ！ひみつの大捜索)	Maika Shizuhara	Yasushi Muroya	June 16, 2024
12	"The Secret of the AiPri Verse"; Transliteration: "Aipuri Bāsu no Himitsu" (Japanese: アイプリバースのひみつ)	Junichi Fujisaku	Junichi Fujisaku	June 23, 2024
13	"The Grand Prix Coord of Passion"; Transliteration: "Jōnetsu no Guran Puri Kōde" (Japanese: 情熱のグランプリコーデ)	Gigaemon Ichikawa	Masaki Ōzora	June 30, 2024
14	"Deliver! A Secret Live"; Transliteration: "Todoke! Himitsu no Raibu" (Japanese: とどけ! ひみつのライブ)	Yūsuke Shiratori	Natsuki Takemura	July 7, 2024
15	"Aim for the Grand Prix Winner!"; Transliteration: "Mezase! Guran Puri Yūshō" (Japanese: めざせ! グランプリ優勝)	Yumi Suzumori	Meigo Naitō	July 14, 2024
16	"Himari, Mitsuki, and Tsumugi"; Transliteration: "Himari to Mitsuki to Tsumugi" (Japanese: ひまりとみつきとつむぎ)	Yumi Suzumori	Hiroyuki Fukushima	July 21, 2024
17	"The Aismirin's Secret"; Transliteration: "Aisumairin no Himitsu" (Japanese: アイスマイリンのひみつ)	Natsu Yoshioka	Masaki Ōzora	July 28, 2024
18	"Himari's Graduation Exam"; Transliteration: "Himari no Sotsugyō Shiken" (Japanese: ひまりの卒業試験)	Gigaemon Ichikawa	Kentarō Fujita	August 4, 2024
19	"Search for the Mermaid's Stardust!"; Transliteration: "Sagase! Ningyo no Hoshikuzu" (Japanese: さがせ! 人魚の星くず)	Gigaemon Ichikawa	Natsuki Takemura	August 11, 2024
20	"Himari's Secret"; Transliteration: "Himari no Himitsu" (Japanese: ひまりのひみつ)	Maika Shizuhara	Meigo Naitō	August 18, 2024
21	"Secret Deserted Island / AiPri Summer Festival"; Transliteration: "Himitsu no Mujintou / Aipuri Samaa Fesu" (Japanese: ひみつの無人島/アイプリサマーフェス)	Yūsuke Shiratori	Masaki Ōzora	August 25, 2024
22	"Run! Her First Love!"; Transliteration: "Hashire! Ano Ko no Hatsukoi" (Japanese: はしれ！あのその初恋)	Natsu Yoshioka	Makoto Satō	September 1, 2024
23	"Fall Cute Collection"; Transliteration: "Aki no Kawaii Korekushon" (Japanese: 秋のカワイイコレクション)	Natsu Yoshioka	Minoru Ōhara	September 8, 2024
24	"The Secret of the Grand Prix Coord"; Transliteration: "Guranpuri Kōde no Himitsu" (Japanese: グランプリコーデのひみつ)	Junichi Fujisaku	Junichi Fujisaku	September 15, 2024
25	"The Secret of the Student Council's Formation"; Transliteration: "Seitokai Tanjō no Himitsu" (Japanese: 生徒会誕生のひみつ)	Yumi Suzumori	Kentarō Fujita	September 22, 2024
26	"We are Quartet Star!"; Transliteration: "We are Karutetto Sutā" (Japanese: We are カルテットスター!)	Yumi Suzumori	Masaki Ōzora	September 29, 2024
27	"The Secret Fashionable Witches"; Transliteration: "Himitsu no Oshare Majo" (Japanese: ひみつのオシャレ魔女)	Gigaemon Ichikawa	Wataru Nakagawa	October 6, 2024
28	"A Soft Career Exploration"; Transliteration: "Fuwafuwa Oshigoto Taiken" (Japanese: ふわふわ♪お仕事体験)	Gigaemon Ichikawa	Minoru Ōhara	October 13, 2024
29	"Onii-chan Exchange"; Transliteration: "Onii-chan Koukan" (Japanese: おにいちゃんこうかん)	Yūsuke Shiratori	Makoto Satō	October 20, 2024
30	"Miracle!? Halloween"; Transliteration: "Mirakuru!? Harowin" (Japanese: ミラクル!? ハロウィン)	Natsu Yoshioka	Meigo Naitō	October 27, 2024
31	"The Promised Brightest Star"; Transliteration: "Yakusoku no Ichibanboshi" (Japanese: やくそくの一番星)	Yumi Suzumori	Natsuki Takemura	November 3, 2024
32	"Playing Tag with Aimu"; Transliteration: "Aimu to Onigokko" (Japanese: アイムゥとおにごっこ)	Maika Shizuhara	Masaki Ōzora	November 10, 2024
33	"A Troubled AiPri Grand Prix"; Transliteration: "Haran no Aipuri Guran Puri" (Japanese: 波乱のアイプリグランプリ)	Natsu Yoshioka	Itsurō Kawasaki	November 17, 2024
34	"Words of Light"; Transliteration: "Hikari no Kotoba" (Japanese: ヒカリノコトバ)	Natsu Yoshioka	Makoto Satō	November 24, 2024
35	"Suzukaze Tsumugi's Secret"; Transliteration: "Suzukaze Tsumugi no Himitsu" (Japanese: 鈴風つむぎのひみつ)	Gigaemon Ichikawa	Junichi Fujisaku	December 1, 2024
36	"The Secret Priusa"; Transliteration: "Himitsu no Puriusa" (Japanese: ひみつのプリうさ)	Yumi Suzumori	Meigo Naitō	December 8, 2024
37	"Can I Jump Over Vault Boxes?"; Transliteration: "Tobibako, Toberu kana?" (Japanese: とびばこ, とべるかな?)	Yūsuke Shiratori	Masahiro Matsunaga	December 15, 2024
38	"Mitsuki's White Christmas"; Transliteration: "Mitsuki no Howaito Kurisumasu" (Japanese: みつきのホワイトクリスマス)	Maika Shizuhara	Makoto Satō	December 22, 2024
39	"Himari Takes a New Step!"; Transliteration: "Himari, Arata na Suteppu!" (Japanese: ひまり, あらたなステップ!)	Yumi Suzumori	Masaki Ōzora	January 5, 2025
40	"The Brightest Star in the Dark Night"; Transliteration: "Yamiyo no Ichibanboshi" (Japanese: 闇夜の一番星)	Natsu Yoshioka	Meigo Naitō	January 12, 2025
41	"The Strongest Dark Star"; Transliteration: "Saikyō no Dāku Sutā" (Japanese: 最強のダークスター)	Gigaemon Ichikawa	Masahiro Matsunaga	January 19, 2025
42	"Take the AiPri Verse Back"; Transliteration: "Aipuri Bāsu o Torimodose" (Japanese: アイプリバースをとりもどせ)	Yūsuke Shiratori	Itsurō Kawasaki	January 26, 2025
43	"Dark Quartet Star"; Transliteration: "Dāku Karutetto Sutā" (Japanese: ダークカルテットスター)	Natsu Yoshioka	Masaki Ōzora	February 2, 2025
44	"Valentine's Day and Princess Priusa"; Transliteration: "Barentain to Puriusa Hime" (Japanese: バレンタインとプリうさ姫)	Maika Shizuhara	Junichi Fujisaku	February 9, 2025
45	"Save Tsumugi-chan!"; Transliteration: "Tsumugi-chan o Sukue!" (Japanese: つむぎちゃんを救え！)	Yumi Suzumori	Meigo Naitō	February 16, 2025
46	"Tsumugi's Feelings Echo"; Transliteration: "Hibiku, Tsumugi no Omoi" (Japanese: 響く、つむぎの想い)	Yumi Suzumori	Makoto Satō	February 23, 2025
47	"Everyone's Song to Reach Tsumugi"; Transliteration: "Tsumugi ni Todoke, Minna no Uta" (Japanese: つむぎに届け、みんなの歌)	Natsu Yoshioka	Masaki Ōzora	March 2, 2025
48	"The Secret Princess"; Transliteration: "Himitsu no Purinsesu" (Japanese: ひみつのプリンセス)	Natsu Yoshioka	Meigo Naitō	March 9, 2025
49	"The Final Grand Prix Begins"; Transliteration: "Fainaru Guran Puri Kaimaku" (Japanese: ファイナルグランプリ開幕)	Yūsuke Shiratori	Natsuki Takemura	March 16, 2025
50	"Our Grand Prix"; Transliteration: "Watashi-tachi no Guran Puri" (Japanese: わたしたちのグランプリ)	Maika Shizuhara	Itsurō Kawasaki	March 23, 2025
51	"The Shiny Star AiPri"; Transliteration: "Kirakira no Sutā AiPuri" (Japanese: キラキラのスターアイプリ)	Yumi Suzumori	Junichi Fujisaku	March 30, 2025

=== Season 2: Ring Arc (2025-26) ===
No. overall	No. in season	Title	Written by	Storyboard by	Original release date
52	1	"A Thrilling New Encounter"; Transliteration: "Tokimeki☆Atarashī Deai" (Japanese: ときめき☆あたらしい出会い)	Gigaemon Ichikawa	Masahiro Matsunaga & Junichi Fujisaku & Kentarō Yamaguchi	April 6, 2025
53	2	"Juria's Secret"; Transliteration: "Juria no Himitsu" (Japanese: じゅりあのひみつ)	Hideaki Shirasaka	Meigo Naitō	April 13, 2025
54	3	"Elle's Secret"; Transliteration: "Eru no Himitsu" (Japanese: えるのひみつ)	Saji Komori	Naoki Ōhira	April 20, 2025
55	4	"Showdown! Cleaning Match"; Transliteration: "Taiketsu! Kurīningu Macchi" (Japanese: 対決！クリーニングマッチ)	Natsu Yoshioka	Makoto Satō	April 27, 2025
56	5	"The Secret AiPri Contest"; Transliteration: "Himitsu no Aipuri Kontesuto" (Japanese: ひみつのアイプリコンテスト)	Yūsuke Shiratori	Akira Tsuchiya	May 4, 2025
57	6	"The Two After the Rain"; Transliteration: "Ameagari no Futari" (Japanese: 雨上がりのふたり)	Yumi Suzumori	Meigo Naitō	May 11, 2025
58	7	"The AiPri Contest Begins!"; Transliteration: "Aipuri Kontesuto Kaimaku!" (Japanese: アイプリコンテスト開幕！)	Maika Shizuhara	Masaki Ōzora	May 18, 2025
59	8	"Princess Ring Appears"; Transliteration: "Ringu Hime, Tōjō" (Japanese: リング姫、登場)	Hideaki Shirasaka	Junichi Fujisaku	May 25, 2025
60	9	"The Rumored Transfer Student"; Transliteration: "Uwasa no Tenkōsei" (Japanese: うわさの転校生)	Saji Komori	Naoki Ōhira	June 1, 2025
61	10	"A Single Secret"; Transliteration: "Tatta Hitotsu no Himitsu" (Japanese: たったひとつのひみつ)	Natsu Yoshioka	Makoto Satō	June 8, 2025
62	11	"Otome the Producer"; Transliteration: "Otome no Purodyūsu" (Japanese: おとめのプロデュース)	Yūsuke Shiratori	Meigo Naitō	June 15, 2025
63	12	"Fly! Jumping Rocket"; Transliteration: "Tobe! Janpin Roketto" (Japanese: とべ！ジャンピンロケット)	Yumi Suzumori	Natsuki Takemura	June 22, 2025
64	13	"My Melody and Kuromi Are Here"; Transliteration: "Mai Merodi to Kuromi ga Yattekita" (Japanese: マイメロディとクロミがやってきた)	Gigaemon Ichikawa	Meigo Naitō	June 29, 2025
65	14	"A Friend's Smile"; Transliteration: "Otomodachi no Egao" (Japanese: おともだちのえがお)	Hideaki Shirasaka	Masaki Ōzora	July 6, 2025
66	15	"An Aimu Gathering!"; Transliteration: "Aimuu Dai Shūgō!" (Japanese: アイムゥ大集合！)	Junichi Fujisaku	Junichi Fujisaku	July 13, 2025
67	16	"The Second AiPri Contest"; Transliteration: "Dai 2-kai AiPuri Kontesuto" (Japanese: 第２回アイプリコンテスト)	Maika Shizuhara	Naoki Ōhira	July 20, 2025
68	17	"Mitsuki and the Start of Summer"; Transliteration: "Mitsuki to Natsu no Hajimari" (Japanese: みつきと夏のはじまり)	Saji Komori	Yoshimasa Hiraike	July 27, 2025
69	18	"Would You Like Delichiious Shaved Ice?"; Transliteration: "OiChii Kakigōri wa Ikaga?" (Japanese: おいチィかき氷はいかが？)	Natsu Yoshioka	Naotaka Hayashi	August 3, 2025
70	19	"Tsumugi and the Summer Fest"; Transliteration: "Tsumugi to Samā Fesu" (Japanese: つむぎとサマーフェス)	Yūsuke Shiratori	Masaki Ōzora	August 10, 2025
71	20	"Vivi is Chii's Number One Pupil"; Transliteration: "Bibi wa Chii no Ichiban Deshi" (Japanese: ビビはチィの一番弟子)	Yumi Suzumori	Naoki Ōhira	August 17, 2025
72	21	"A Serious Battle! Vivi VS Chii"; Transliteration: "Shinken Shōbu! Bibi VS Chii" (Japanese: 真剣勝負！ビビVSチィ)	Hideaki Shirasaka	Meigo Naitō	August 24, 2025
73	22	"The Dazzling Brightest Star"; Transliteration: "Giragira no Ichibanboshi" (Japanese: ギラギラの一番星)	Hideaki Shirasaka	Meigo Naitō	August 31, 2025
74	23	"Mitsuki and the Secret Birthday"; Transliteration: "Mitsuki to Himitsu no Bāsudē" (Japanese: みつきとひみつのバースデー)	Saji Komori	Takebumi Anzai	September 7, 2025
75	24	"A Teary AiPri Contest"; Transliteration: "Namida no AiPuri Kontesuto" (Japanese: 涙のアイプリコンテスト)	Maika Shizuhara	Toshiyuki Kashiyama	September 14, 2025
76	25	"The First Stage"; Transliteration: "Hajimete no Sutēji" (Japanese: はじめてのステージ)	Natsu Yoshioka	Masaki Ōzora	September 21, 2025
77	26	"Princess' Miracle"; Transliteration: "Purinsesu no Kiseki" (Japanese: プリンセスのきせき)	Junichi Fujisaku	Junichi Fujisaku	September 28, 2025
78	27	"The Secret Test"; Transliteration: "Himitsu no Tesuto" (Japanese: ひみつのテスト)	Yūsuke Shiratori	Naoki Ōhira	October 5, 2025
79	28	"True Feelings"; Transliteration: "Hontō no Kimochi" (Japanese: ほんとうのキモチ)	Yumi Suzumori	Naotaka Hayashi	October 12, 2025
80	29	"The Prophecy and the Secret Dream"; Transliteration: "Uranai to Himitsu no Yume" (Japanese: うらないとひみつの夢)	Hideaki Shirasaka	Meigo Naitō	October 19, 2025
81	30	"Princess Ring and the Secret Halloween"; Transliteration: "Ringu Hime to Himitsu no Harōin" (Japanese: リング姫とひみつのハロウィン)	Saji Komori	Meigo Naitō	October 26, 2025
82	31	"Tsumugi and Ring"; Transliteration: "Tsumugi to Ringu" (Japanese: つむぎとリング)	Maika Shizuhara	Masaki Ōzora	November 2, 2025
83	32	"The Lonely Princess"; Transliteration: "Hitoribocchi no Purinsesu" (Japanese: ひとりぼっちのプリンセス)	Natsu Yoshioka	Naoki Ōhira	November 9, 2025
84	33	"A Blooming AiPri Contest"; Transliteration: "Hanasaku Aipuri Kontesuto" (Japanese: 花咲くアイプリコンテスト)	Saji Komori	Junichi Fujisaku	November 16, 2025
85	34	"Our Courage"; Transliteration: "Watashi-tachi no Yūki" (Japanese: わたしたちの勇気)	Yūsuke Shiratori	Meigo Naitō	November 23, 2025
86	35	"Quartet Star Has Returned"; Transliteration: "Kaette Kita Karutetto Sutā" (Japanese: 帰ってきたカルテットスター)	Yumi Suzumori	Meigo Naitō	November 30, 2025
87	36	"Himari's Mom's Secret"; Transliteration: "Himari no Mama no Himitsu" (Japanese: ひまりのママのひみつ)	Hideaki Shirasaka	Masaki Ōzora	December 7, 2025
88	37	"The Secret of the Ring"; Transliteration: "Yubiwa no Himitsu" (Japanese: 指輪のひみつ)	Natsu Yoshioka	Naoki Ōhira	December 14, 2025
89	38	"A Fun Winter Festival!"; Transliteration: "Tanoshī Uintā Fesutibaru!" (Japanese: 楽しいウィンターフェスティバル！)	Junichi Fujisaku	Junichi Fujisaku	December 21, 2025
90	39	"Lots of Mitsuki-chan"; Transliteration: "Mitsuki-chan ga Ippai" (Japanese: みつきちゃんがいっぱい)	Maika Shizuhara	Natsuki Takemura	January 4, 2026
91	40	"Legend Story!!!!"; Transliteration: "Rejendo Sutōrī!!!!" (Japanese: レジェンド・ストーリー!!!!)	Saji Komori	Toshiyuki Kashiyama	January 11, 2026
92	41	"A Heartfelt AiPri Contest"; Transliteration: "Omoi Tsutawaru Aipuri Kontesuto" (Japanese: 想い伝わるアイプリコンテスト)	Yumi Suzumori	Naoki Ōhira	January 18, 2026
93	42	"Because I Love You"; Transliteration: "Daisuki Dakara" (Japanese: 大好きだから)	Yūsuke Shiratori	Masaki Ōzora	January 25, 2026
94	43	"The Secret Valentine's Day"; Transliteration: "Himitsu no Barentain Dē" (Japanese: ひみつのバレンタインデー)	Hideaki Shirasaka	Naoki Ōhira	February 1, 2026
95	44	"Wako and Ring"; Transliteration: "Wako to Ringu" (Japanese: わことリング)	Natsu Yoshioka	Meigo Naitō	February 8, 2026
96	45	"Ring Clover's Secret"; Transliteration: "Ringu Kurōbā no Himitsu" (Japanese: リング・クローバーのひみつ)	Maika Shizuhara	Meigo Naitō	February 15, 2026
97	46	"Connecting Ring"; Transliteration: "Tsunagaru Ringu" (Japanese: つながるリング)	Maika Shizuhara	Masaki Ōzora	February 22, 2026
98	47	"Open the Door"; Transliteration: "Tobira o Hiraite" (Japanese: とびらをひらいて)	Saji Komori	Meigo Naitō	March 1, 2026
99	48	"The Final AiPri Contest Begins"; Transliteration: "Fainaru Aipuri Kontesuto Kaimaku" (Japanese: ファイナル・アイプリコンテスト開幕)	Yūsuke Shiratori	Masaki Ōzora	March 8, 2026
100	49	"We're AiPri"; Transliteration: "We're Aipuri" (Japanese: We're アイプリ)	Yūsuke Shiratori	Naoki Ōhira	March 15, 2026
101	50	"The Song of Departure"; Transliteration: "Tabidachi no Uta" (Japanese: 旅だちのうた)	Yumi Suzumori	Meigo Naitō	March 22, 2026
102	51	"Himitsu no AiPri"; Transliteration: "Himitsu no AiPuri" (Japanese: ひみつのアイプリ)	Hideaki Shirasaka	Meigo Naitō	March 29, 2026
