= List of Amazon Prime Video exclusive international distribution programming =

These series are programs that have aired on other networks where Amazon Prime Video has bought exclusive distribution rights to stream them in alternate regions on its own platform, although Amazon lists them as Prime Video Originals. Worldwide exclusivity usually excludes a TV shows' home country.

== TV shows ==
=== Drama ===
Title	Genre	Original broadcaster	Country	Prime Video exclusive region	Seasons	Original run
The ABC Murders	Mystery thriller	BBC One	United Kingdom	United States	3 episodes	2018
Absentia (seasons 1–2)	Thriller	AXN	Spain	United States	2 seasons, 20 episodes	2017–19
American Gods	Fantasy drama	Starz	United States	Worldwide	3 seasons, 26 episodes	2017–21
Black Sails	Historical drama	Starz	United States	United Kingdom and Ireland	4 seasons, 38 episodes	2014–17
Bosch: Legacy	Police procedural	Amazon Freevee	United States	Selected territories	2 seasons, 20 episodes	2022–
A Very British Scandal	Historical drama	BBC One	United Kingdom	United States	3 episodes	2021
The Capture	Mystery crime drama	BBC One	United Kingdom	Canada	1 season, 6 episodes	2019
The Continental: From the World of John Wick	Action thriller	Peacock	United States	Selected territories	3 episodes	2023
Cruel Summer	Thriller	Freeform	United States	Worldwide except Canada	2 seasons, 20 episodes	2021–23
DMZ	Dystopian thriller	HBO Max	United States	France	1 season, 4 episodes	2022
Doctor Thorne	Period drama	ITV	United Kingdom	Worldwide except Ireland and Japan	3 episodes	2016
The Expanse (seasons 1–3)	Space opera	Syfy	United States	Worldwide	3 seasons, 36 episodes	2015–18
Falling Water	Fantasy drama	USA	United States	Switzerland	1 season, 10 episodes	2016–18
The Girlfriend Experience	Anthology	Starz	United States	Selected territories	3 seasons, 37 episodes	2016–21
Halt and Catch Fire	Period drama	AMC	United States	United Kingdom, Ireland and Switzerland	4 seasons, 40 episodes	2014–17
The Head	Mystery thriller	Orange TV; HBO Asia; Hulu Japan	Spain; Japan	Selected territories	6 episodes	2020
Informer	Crime drama	BBC One	United Kingdom	United States	1 season, 6 episodes	2019
Into the Badlands	Action drama/Wuxia	AMC	United States	Selected territories	3 seasons, 32 episodes	2015–19
It's a Sin	Period drama	Channel 4; HBO Max	United Kingdom; United States	Canada	5 episodes	2021
The Last of Us (season 1)	Post-apocalyptic thriller	HBO	United States	France	1 season, 9 episodes	2023
Leonardo	Period drama	Rai 1	Italy	United Kingdom and Ireland	1 season, 8 episodes	2021
Little Fires Everywhere	Mystery thriller	Hulu	United States	Worldwide except India	8 episodes	2020
The Looming Tower	Biopic	Hulu	United States	Worldwide	10 episodes	2018
Marvel's Cloak & Dagger	Superhero drama	Freeform	United States	Selected territories	2 seasons, 20 episodes	2018–19
McMafia	Crime drama	BBC One; AMC	United Kingdom; United States	Worldwide except Canada	1 season, 8 episodes	2018
Most Dangerous Game	Action thriller	Quibi	United States	Selected territories	1 episode (TV movie)	2020
Motherland: Fort Salem	Supernatural drama	Freeform	United States	Selected territories	1 season, 10 episodes	2020
The Night Manager (season 1)	Spy thriller	BBC One; AMC	United Kingdom; United States	Japan	1 season, 6 episodes	2016
Nine Perfect Strangers	Drama	Hulu	United States	Worldwide	8 episodes	2021
Ordeal by Innocence	Crime drama	BBC One	United Kingdom	United States	3 episodes	2018
Outlander	Fantasy drama	Starz	United States	United Kingdom, Ireland and Austria	5 seasons, 67 episodes	2014–2020
The Path	Drama	Hulu	United States	United Kingdom, Ireland and Switzerland	3 seasons, 36 episodes	2016–18
Peacemaker (season 1)	Superhero	HBO Max	United States	France	1 season, 8 episodes	2022
Picnic at Hanging Rock	Mystery/Romantic drama	Fox Showcase	Australia	United States	1 season, 6 episodes	2018
Philip K. Dick's Electric Dreams	Science fiction anthology	Channel 4	United Kingdom	United States, Japan and Latin America	1 season, 10 episodes	2018
Preacher	Adventure drama	AMC	United States	Selected territories	4 seasons, 43 episodes	2016–19
Pretty Little Liars: Original Sin (season 1)	Teen drama/Mystery	HBO Max	United States	France	1 season, 10 episodes	2022
The Purge	Horror	USA Network	United States	Canada, Japan, Latin America and France	2 season, 12 episodes	2018–19
The Pursuit of Love	Romance drama	BBC One	United Kingdom	United States	3 episodes	2021
The Red Road	Drama	SundanceTV	United States	United Kingdom, Ireland and Switzerland	2 seasons, 12 episodes	2014–15
Rogue	Crime drama	Audience Network; The Movie Channel; Movie Central	United States; Canada	United Kingdom, Ireland and Switzerland	4 seasons, 50 episodes	2013–17
Soulmates	Science fiction anthology	AMC	United States	Selected territories	1 season, 6 episodes	2020
Star Trek: Picard	Science fiction	Paramount+	United States	Worldwide except Canada	3 seasons, 30 episodes	2020–23
StartUp	Drama	Crackle	United States	Worldwide	3 seasons, 30 episodes	2016–18
White Dragon	Thriller	ITV	United Kingdom	Selected territories	1 season, 8 episodes	2018
Those About to Die	Historical drama	Peacock	United States	Selected territories	1 season, 10 episodes	2024
Treadstone	Action drama	USA Network	United States	Worldwide	1 season, 10 episodes	2019
TURN: Washington's Spies	Historical drama	AMC	United States	Ireland, Switzerland and United Kingdom	4 seasons, 40 episodes	2014–17
Vikings (seasons 1–6A)	Historical drama	History	Canada	United Kingdom, Ireland and Japan	4 seasons, 49 episodes	2013–20
The Walking Dead: World Beyond	Horror zombie apocalypse	AMC	United States	Selected territories	2 seasons, 20 episodes	2020–21

=== Comedy ===
Title	Genre	Original broadcaster	Country	Prime Video exclusive region	Seasons	Original run
The Bold Type	Comedy drama	Freeform	United States	Selected territories	5 seasons, 52 episodes	2017–21
BrainDead	Comedy drama	CBS	United States	United Kingdom and Ireland	1 season, 13 episodes	2016
Catastrophe	Comedy	Channel 4	United Kingdom	Worldwide except Japan	4 seasons, 24 episodes	2015–19
Fleabag	Comedy drama	BBC Three	United Kingdom	Worldwide except Ireland	2 seasons, 12 episodes	2016–19
The Flight Attendant	Mystery comedy drama	HBO Max	United States	Germany, Austria and Switzerland	2 seasons, 16 episodes	2021–22
The Goes Wrong Show	Comedy	BBC One	United Kingdom	United States, Canada, New Zealand and Australia	2 seasons, 12 episodes	2020–21
Jury Duty	Comedy	Amazon Freevee	United States	France	1 season, 8 episodes	2023
Kevin Can F**k Himself	Black comedy	AMC	United States	Selected territories	1 season, 8 episodes	2021
Life in Pieces	Sitcom	CBS	United States	United Kingdom and Ireland	2 seasons, 44 episodes	2015–19
Please Like Me	Comedy drama	ABC	Australia	United Kingdom	4 seasons, 32 episodes	2013–16
Roadies	Comedy drama	Showtime	United States	United Kingdom	1 season, 10 episodes	2016
The Sex Lives of College Girls (seasons 1–2)	Comedy drama	HBO Max	United States	France	2 seasons, 20 episodes	2021–22
A Very English Scandal	Comedy drama	BBC One	United Kingdom	Worldwide except Canada, France and Japan	3 episodes	2018
Wayne	Action comedy	YouTube Premium	United States	Selected territories	1 season, 10 episodes	2019
Mrs. Davis	Science fiction comedy drama	Peacock	United States	Germany, Austria & Switzerland	1 season, 8 episodes	2023

=== Animation ===
==== Adult animation ====
Title	Genre	Original broadcaster	Country	Prime Video exclusive region	Seasons	Language	Original run
Star Trek: Lower Decks	Science fiction comedy	Paramount+	United States	Selected territories	3 seasons, 30 episodes	English	2020–22

==== Anime ====
Title	Genre	Original broadcaster	Country	Prime Video exclusive region	Seasons	Language	Original run
Ronja, the Robber's Daughter	Fantasy drama	NHK BS Premium	Japan	United States	26 episodes	English	2014–15
Banana Fish	Crime thriller	Fuji TV	Japan	Worldwide	24 episodes	Japanese	2018
Magilumiere Co. Ltd.	Magical girl workplace comedy	NNS (Nippon TV), BS Nittere, AT-X	Japan	Worldwide	2 seasons, 24 episodes	Japanese	2024–present
Übel Blatt	Dark fantasy	Tokyo MX, BS Nittere, Kansai TV, AT-X	Japan	Worldwide	1 season, 12 episodes	Japanese	2025
The Dinner Table Detective	Mystery	FNS (Noitamina), AT-X	Japan	Worldwide	1 season, 12 episodes	Japanese	2025
From Old Country Bumpkin to Master Swordsman	Fantasy action-adventure	ANN (TV Asahi), BS Asahi, AT-X	Japan	Worldwide	2 seasons, 24 episodes	Japanese	2025–present
Mobile Suit Gundam GQuuuuuuX	Mecha/Military science fiction	NNS (Nippon TV), BS11	Japan	Worldwide	1 season, 12 episodes	Japanese	2025
City the Animation	Slice of life comedy	Tokyo MX, ABC TV, TV Aichi, AT-X, BS11	Japan	Worldwide	1 season, 13 episodes	Japanese	2025
New Panty & Stocking with Garterbelt	Action dark comedy	Tokyo MX, BS Nittere, SUN, KBS Kyoto, Mie TV, TVQ, GBS, TVh (Rated 12+); AT-X (Rated 18+)	Japan	Worldwide	1 season, 13 episodes	Japanese	2025
A Star Brighter Than the Sun	Coming-of-age romantic drama	JNN (TBS), AT-X	Japan	Worldwide	1 season, 12 episodes	Japanese	2025–present
Sanda	Mystery fantasy adventure	MBS, TBS, CBC TV, BS-TBS (Animeism)	Japan	Worldwide	1 season, 12 episodes	Japanese	2025
Ninja vs. Gokudo	Action dark comedy	Nippon TV (AnichU), BS Nittere	Japan	Worldwide	1 season, 12 episodes	Japanese	2025
The Darwin Incident	Science fiction social thriller	TXN (TV Tokyo), BS TV Tokyo	Japan	Worldwide	1 season, 13 episodes	Japanese	2026
Nippon Sangoku -The Three Nations of the Crimson Sun-	Post-apocalyptic political drama	Tokyo MX, BS Nittere, TV Aichi, ytv, OX, ITC, BBT, EBC, tys, SBS Shizuoka, ABS, BSN, Fukui TV, TKU, TOS, HBC, RSK, NBS, AT-X	Japan	Worldwide	1 season, 12 episodes	Japanese	2026–present
Fist of the North Star	Post-apocalyptic martial arts action-adventure	Tokyo MX, BS11 (Rated 12+)	Japan	Worldwide	1 season, 24 episodes	Japanese	2026–present
The Ghost in the Shell	Cyberpunk action-adventure	Kansai TV, Fuji TV (Ka-Anival!!), Channel NECO	Japan	Worldwide	1 season, 12 episodes	Japanese	2026
Tank Chair	Science fiction action thriller	Tokyo MX, BS11, CBC TV, MBS, AT-X	Japan	Worldwide	TBA	Japanese	2026

==== Kids & family ====
Title	Genre	Original broadcaster	Country	Prime Video exclusive region	Seasons	Language	Original run
Bookaboo	Children's	CITV	United Kingdom	United States and Japan	1 season, 8 episodes	English	2016
Kalari Kids	Adventure	TBA	India	Selected territories	3 seasons, 60 episodes	English	2017–19
Thunderbirds Are Go	Science fiction	ITV	United Kingdom	United States	2 seasons, 52 episodes	English	2015–20

=== Non-English language ===
==== Scripted ====
Title	Genre	Original broadcaster	Country	Prime Video exclusive region	Seasons	Language	Original run
The Bureau	Political thriller	Canal+	France	United Kingdom and Ireland	5 seasons, 50 episodes	French	2015–20
Yumi's Cells (season 2)	Romantic drama	TVING	South Korea	Worldwide	1 season, 14 episodes	Korean	2022
Curtain Call	Melodrama	KBS2	South Korea	Worldwide	16 episodes	Korean	2022
May I Help You?	Melodrama	MBC TV	South Korea	Worldwide	16 episodes	Korean	2022
Island	Fantasy action	TVING	South Korea	Worldwide	1 season, 12 episodes	Korean	2022–23
Payback: Money and Power	Revenge drama	SBS TV	South Korea	Worldwide	12 episodes	Korean	2023
True to Love	Romantic comedy	ENA	South Korea	Worldwide	14 episodes	Korean	2023
Tale of the Nine Tailed 1938	Fantasy action drama	tvN	South Korea	Worldwide	12 episodes	Korean	2023
Battle for Happiness	Mystery drama	ENA	South Korea	Worldwide	16 episodes	Korean	2023
Lies Hidden in My Garden	Suspense thriller mystery	ENA	South Korea	Worldwide	8 episodes	Korean	2023
Heartbeat	Romantic fantasy comedy	KBS2	South Korea	Worldwide	16 episodes	Korean	2023
The Killing Vote	Crime thriller	SBS TV	South Korea	Worldwide	12 episodes	Korean	2023
Dirty Linen	Revenge drama	Kapamilya Channel	Philippines	Worldwide	1 season, 12 episodes	Filipino	2023
The Kidnapping Day	Crime thriller	ENA	South Korea	Worldwide	12 episodes	Korean	2023
Death's Game	Fantasy anthology mystery thriller	TVING	South Korea	Worldwide	1 season, 8 episodes	Korean	2023–24
Marry My Husband	Romantic revenge drama	tvN	South Korea	Worldwide	16 episodes	Korean	2024
No Gain No Love	Romantic comedy	tvN; TVING	South Korea	Worldwide	12 episode	Korean	2024
Spice Up Our Love	Romantic fantasy	TVING	South Korea	Worldwide	2 episodes	Korean	2024
Newtopia	Zombie apocalypse romantic comedy	Coupang Play	South Korea	Worldwide	1 season, 10 episodes	Korean	2025
The Divorce Insurance	Workplace romantic comedy	tvN	South Korea	Worldwide	12 episodes	Korean	2025
Good Boy	Action crime comedy	JTBC	South Korea	Worldwide	16 episodes	Korean	2025
The World Between Us: After the Flames	Social thriller	PTS; Catchplay	Taiwan	Worldwide	1 season, 10 episodes	Taiwanese Mandarin	2025
Head over Heels	Romantic fantasy comedy	tvN	South Korea	Worldwide	16 episodes	Korean	2025
Islanders	Workplace drama	Catchplay	Taiwan	Worldwide except Hong Kong	7 episodes	Taiwanese Mandarin	2025
Nice to Not Meet You	Romantic comedy	tvN	South Korea	Worldwide	16 episodes	Korean	2025
Surely Tomorrow	Romantic drama	JTBC	South Korea	Worldwide except Taiwan	12 episodes	Korean	2025–26
Spring Fever	Romantic comedy	tvN	South Korea	Worldwide	12 episodes	Korean	2026
Siren's Kiss	Romantic thriller	tvN	South Korea	Worldwide	12 episodes	Korean	2026
Absolute Value of Romance	Coming-of-age romantic comedy	Coupang Play	South Korea	Worldwide	16 episodes	Korean	2026
See You at Work Tomorrow!	Workplace romantic comedy	tvN	South Korea	Worldwide	12 episodes	Korean	2026
A Love Other Than Yours	Romantic drama	KBS2	South Korea	Worldwide	14 episodes	Korean	2026
Love in Disguise	Workplace romantic comedy	tvN	South Korea	Worldwide	12 episodes	Korean	2026
Final Table	Cooking slice of life	JTBC	South Korea	Worldwide	12 episodes	Korean	2026
Awaiting release
Nine to Six	Romantic comedy	SBS TV	South Korea	Worldwide	12 episodes	Korean	2026
Sacred Jewel	Historical action melodrama	JTBC	South Korea	Worldwide	12 episodes	Korean	2026
Human X Gumiho	Fantasy romantic comedy	JTBC	South Korea	Worldwide	TBA	Korean	2027

==== Unscripted ====
Title	Genre	Original broadcaster	Country	Prime Video exclusive region	Seasons	Language	Original run
De viaje con los Derbez	Docu-comedy/Reality show	Pantaya	United States	Worldwide	1 season, 8 episodes	Spanish	2019
The Devil's Confession: The Lost Eichmann Tapes	History docuseries	Kan	Israel	United States	3 episodes	Hebrew	2022
Jinny's Kitchen	Reality show	tvN	South Korea	Selected territories	2 seasons, 22 episodes	Korean	2023–24
Wild Isles	Nature documentary	BBC One	United Kingdom	Worldwide	1 season, 5 episodes	English	2023
Jinny's Kitchen: Team Building	Reality show	tvN	South Korea	Worldwide	1 season, 2 episodes	Korean	2023
Just Makeup	Makeup reality competition	Coupang Play	South Korea	Worldwide	TBA	Korean	2025

== Films ==
Title	Genre	Release date	Prime Video exclusive region	Language
Crown Heights	Drama	December 8, 2017	Selected territories	English
Zoe	Science fiction	July 20, 2018	United States, Canada, United Kingdom, Ireland, Australia, New Zealand and Italy	English
King Lear	Drama	September 28, 2018	Selected territories	English
The Catcher Was a Spy	War film	September 28, 2018	Selected territories	English
The Upside	Comedy drama	April 19, 2019	Worldwide except Canada and United States	English
Saving Zoë	Drama	December 12, 2019	Selected territories	English
Palm Springs	Science fiction romantic comedy	November 20, 2020 (Note: Australia and New Zealand); December 18, 2020 (Note: Canada); April 9, 2021 (Note: United Kingdom, Netherlands, and France)	United Kingdom, Ireland, France, Australia, New Zealand, Canada and Netherlands	English
After We Collided	Romantic drama	December 22, 2020	Selected territories	English
The Guest Room (Note: This film was once available, but have been since removed from the service.)	Drama thriller	January 4, 2021	Worldwide	Italian
I Care a Lot	Dark comedy thriller	February 19, 2021	United Kingdom, Ireland, Canada, Australia, New Zealand and Italy	English
Je te veux moi non plus	Comedy	March 26, 2021	Worldwide	French
The Sleepwalkers	Drama	March 31, 2021	United States and Latin America	Spanish
Stowaway	Science fiction	April 22, 2021	Canada	English
My Tender Matador	Romantic drama	June 4, 2021	Latin America	Spanish
Evangelion: 3.0+1.0 Thrice Upon a Time	Anime	August 13, 2021	Worldwide except Japan	Japanese
Una relazione	Romantic drama	September 13, 2021	Italy	Italian
Doblemente embarazada	Comedy drama	September 30, 2021	Worldwide	Spanish
Most Dangerous Game	Action thriller	October 1, 2021	Selected territories	English
Time Is Up	Romantic comedy	October 25, 2021	Selected territories	English
Io sono Babbo Natale	Comedy	November 3, 2021	Italy	Italian
The Hating Game	Comedy	December 10, 2021	Selected territories	English
Deep Water	Psychological thriller	March 18, 2022	Worldwide except United States	English
House of Gucci	Drama	August 1, 2022	Worldwide	English
About Fate	Romantic comedy	September 8, 2022	Selected territories	English
Meet Cute	Romantic comedy	September 21, 2022	Selected territories	English
BDE	Comedy	January 20, 2023	Selected territories	French
Grosso guaio all'Esquilino - La leggenda del kung fu	Comedy	April 6, 2023	Italy	Italian
One True Loves	Drama	April 7, 2023	Selected territories	English
La Tête dans les étoiles	Comedy	July 6, 2023	Selected territories	French
Shin Kamen Rider	Superhero	July 21, 2023	Selected territories	Japanese
Bottoms	Teen comedy	September 22, 2023	Selected territories	English
The Other Zoey	Romantic comedy	October 20, 2023	Selected territories	English
Time Is Up 2	Romantic comedy	October 27, 2023	Selected territories	English
The Ministry of Ungentlemanly Warfare	Historical action comedy	July 25, 2024	Europe, Latin America, Australia, New Zealand, Canada, South Africa, India and pan-Asian pay television	English
Puppy Love	Romantic comedy	September 11, 2024	Selected territories	English
The Killer's Game	Action thriller	September 13, 2024	Selected territories	English
One More Shot	Action thriller	October 5, 2024	Selected territories	English
Red One	Christmas action comedy	December 12, 2024	Selected territories	English
The Order	True crime	February 6, 2025	Selected territories	English
Blue Period	Drama	February 7, 2025	United States and Japan	Japanese
Gangstas	Action thriller	February 19, 2025	Selected territories	Flemish
Nickel Boys	Drama	February 27, 2025	Selected territories	English
O Auto da Compadecida 2	Comedy	February 28, 2025	Selected territories	Portuguese
Superboys of Malegaon	Drama	February 28, 2025	Selected territories	Hindi
Ash	Science fiction horror	March 21, 2025	Selected territories	English
Chico Bento e a Goiabeira Maraviósa	Comedy	March 22, 2025	Selected territories	Portuguese
The Assessment	Science fiction thriller	May 8, 2025	Worldwide except United States and Germany	English
A Working Man	Action thriller	May 15, 2025	Selected territories	English
The Fire and the Moth	Crime drama	June 3, 2025	Selected territories	English
Message in a Bottle	Science fiction romantic comedy	June 13, 2025	United States & Latin America	Spanish
She Rides Shotgun	Crime thriller	August 1, 2025	Selected territories	English
Ice Road: Vengeance	Action	September 5, 2025	Selected territories	English
Belén	Legal drama	September 18, 2025	Selected territories	Spanish
After the Hunt	Psychological thriller	October 10, 2025	Selected territories	English
Crime 101	Crime thriller	February 13, 2026	Selected territories	English
Over Your Dead Body	Action thriller	June 10, 2026	Worldwide except United States	English
Double Occupancy	Romantic comedy	June 12, 2026	Selected territories	Tamil
The Sheep Detectives	Mystery comedy	June 24, 2026	Worldwide	English
Boulevard	Romantic comedy	July 10, 2026	Worldwide	Spanish
Masters of the Universe	Action fantasy	July 22, 2026	Worldwide	English
Love Oh Love	Romantic comedy	July 31, 2026	Selected territories	Tamil
Ali G: Who Iz I?	mockumentary	October 28, 2026	Worldwide	English
Sakamoto Days	Action spy comedy	October 30, 2026	Worldwide	Japanese
The Mongoose	Action	November 4, 2026	Selected territories	English

== Documentaries ==
Chiara Ferragni: Unposted	November 29, 2019	Selected territories	English/Italian
