= Flower and Asura =

Japanese manga series

- First tankōbon volume cover

花は咲く、修羅の如く (Hana wa Saku, Shura no Gotoku)
- Genre: Coming-of-age
- Manga
- Written by: Ayano Takeda
- Illustrated by: Musshu
- Published by: Shueisha
- English publisher: Shueisha (digital)
- Imprint: Young Jump Comics
- Magazine: Ultra Jump
- Original run: June 18, 2021 – August 19, 2026
- Volumes: 11
- Anime television series
- Directed by: Ayumu Uwano
- Written by: Kazuyuki Fudeyasu
- Music by: Masaru Yokoyama
- Studio: Studio Bind
- Licensed by: Sentai Filmworks (Note: Home video rights through Section23 Films and streaming rights through Hidive.)
- Original network: Nippon TV, BS NTV, CTC, TVS, tvk, SUN, KBS Kyoto, AT-X
- Original run: January 8, 2025 – March 26, 2025
- Episodes: 12
- icon

Flower and Asura (花は咲く、修羅の如く, Hana wa Saku, Shura no Gotoku; lit. 'The Flower Blooms, Like Ashura'), also known as simply Hanashura, is a Japanese manga series written by Ayano Takeda and illustrated by Musshu. It was serialized in Shueisha's seinen manga magazine Ultra Jump from June 2021 to August 2026, with its chapters compiled into eleven tankōbon volumes.

Set in fictional island of Tonakishima, loosely based on Ukyō Ward in Kyoto, the story follows a Japanese high school girl named Hana who admires recitals and holds regular reading sessions for the island's children. Her friend, Mizuki, the president of the Broadcasting Club, senses Hana's power to attract people through her reading and invites her to join the club.

A 12-episode anime television series adaptation produced by Studio Bind aired from January to March 2025.

== Plot ==
Hana Haruyama, a first-year student living in the island of Tonakishima, has always had a passion for reading. She uses this to read stories to the children, finding happiness in sharing her love for literature. This catches the attention of Mizuki Usurai, the president of her school's Broadcasting Club. Seeing Hana's potential, Mizuki invites Hana to join, which Hana accepts. As part of the Broadcasting Club, Hana experiences the challenges of broadcasting, including participating in competitions, while using her experiences to further develop her own love for reading.

== Characters ==
=== Sumomogaoka High School Broadcasting Club ===
Hana Haruyama (春山 花奈, Haruyama Hana)
Voiced by: Aoi Yūki (vomic), Minori Fujidera (anime) (Japanese); Annie Wild (English)
A first-year student at Sumomogaoka High, who recently joins the Broadcasting Club after being scouted by Mizuki for her skills in storytelling. She was inspired to take up the skill after watching a recital from Shura in her youth. She lives with her mother.
Mizuki Usurai (薄頼 瑞希, Usurai Mizuki)
Voiced by: Yoko Hikasa (vomic), Miyuri Shimabukuro (anime) (Japanese); Olivia Swasey (English)
A second-year student at Sumomogaoka High and the president of the Broadcasting Club who scouted Hana to the club after being left impressed by her delivery and storytelling.
An Natsue (夏江 杏, Natsue An)
Voiced by: Fūka Izumi (Japanese); Alyssa Marek (English)
A first-year student at Sumomogaoka High and a member of the Broadcasting Club, who aspires to win at the national broadcasting competition. She holds a rivalry with Tōga due to their middle schools regarding each other as rivals.
Shūdai Tōga (冬賀 萩太, Tōga Shūdai)
Voiced by: Shōya Chiba (Japanese); Tyler Galindo (English)
A first-year student at Sumomogaoka High and a member of the Broadcasting Club. He holds a rivalry with Natsue due to their middle schools regarding each other as rivals.
Matsuyuki Akiyama (秋山 松雪, Akiyama Matsuyuki)
Voiced by: Seiichiro Yamashita (Japanese); Clint Bickham (English)
A first-year student at Sumomogaoka High and a member of the Broadcasting Club. He often acts as the mediator between Natsue and Tōga.
Ryōko Totonoi (整井 良子, Totonoi Ryōko)
Voiced by: Kiyono Yasuno (Japanese); Kali Marie Potter (English)
A second-year student at Sumomogaoka High and the vice president of the Broadcasting Club.
Setarō Hakoyama (箱山 瀬太郎, Hakoyama Setarō)
Voiced by: Taito Ban (Japanese); Andrew Love (English)
A second-year student at Sumomogaoka High and a member of the Broadcasting Club.
Hiromi Kichijōji (吉祥寺 博美, Kichijōji Hiromi)
Voiced by: Kōji Yusa (Japanese); Brandon Hearnsberger (English)
A teacher at Sumomogaoka High and the advisor for the Broadcasting Club, who is shown to be laidback and easygoing yet insightful for advice on recitation.

=== Lilac Girls' Academy ===
Pokoko Potanpoko (牡丹鉾ぽここ, Potanpoko Pokoko)
Voiced by: Ai Kakuma
Mitsuka Hiiragidani (柊谷満歌, Hiiragidani Mitsuka)
Voiced by: Akira Sekine
Xiang Ling (香玲)
Voiced by: Aoi Koga

=== Otoha High School ===
Ichijiku Minohara (箕原無花果, Minohara Ichijiku)
Voiced by: Yoshino Aoyama
Misaki Kumori (曇美咲, Kumori Misaki)
Voiced by: Kana Ichinose

=== Chizuru High School ===
Rengo Nishino (西野蓮吾, Nishino Rengo)
Voiced by: Taihi Kimura
Chiaki Hayashi (林千晶, Hayashi Chiaki)
Voiced by: Konomi Kohara

=== Other characters ===
Shura Saionji (西園寺 修羅, Saionji Shura)
Voiced by: Yoko Hikasa (Japanese); Shelley Calene-Black (English)
An acclaimed actress who is Hana's inspiration in taking up storytelling.
Miyuko Nekoi (猫井 未唯子, Nekoi Miyuko)
Voiced by: Miyari Nemoto (Japanese); Karlii Hoch (English)
A student in Hana's class who becomes her first friend.
Owari Konoyono (弧ノ夜野 終里, Konoyono Owari)
Voiced by: Ami Koshimizu
A young and aspiring poet who is Matsuyuki's older sister.

== Media ==
=== Manga ===
Written by Ayano Takeda and illustrated by Musshu, Flower and Asura was serializes in Shueisha's seinen manga magazine Ultra Jump from June 18, 2021, to August 19, 2026. The series' chapters were compiled into eleven tankōbon volumes released from January 19, 2022 to October 19, 2026. Shueisha began publishing the manga in English on its Manga Million digital platform in 2026.

| No. | Release date | ISBN |
|---|---|---|
| 1 | January 19, 2022 | 978-4-08-892171-6 |
| 2 | May 18, 2022 | 978-4-08-892322-2 |
| 3 | September 16, 2022 | 978-4-08-892445-8 |
| 4 | February 17, 2023 | 978-4-08-892608-7 |
| 5 | July 19, 2023 | 978-4-08-892764-0 |
| 6 | December 19, 2023 | 978-4-08-893061-9 |
| 7 | June 19, 2024 | 978-4-08-893290-3 |
| 8 | January 17, 2025 | 978-4-08-893535-5 |
| 9 | August 19, 2025 | 978-4-08-893789-2 |
| 10 | March 18, 2026 | 978-4-08-894073-1 |
| 11 | October 19, 2026 | 978-4-08-894387-9 |

=== Anime ===
An anime television series adaptation was announced on June 12, 2024. It is produced by Studio Bind and directed by Ayumu Uwano, with series composition by Kazuyuki Fudeyasu, characters designed by Kou Aine, and music composed by Masaru Yokoyama. The series aired from January 8 to March 26, 2025, on Nippon TV's AnichU programming block and other networks. (Note: Nippon TV lists the series premiere on January 7, 2025, at 25:35, which is effectively January 8 at 1:35 a.m. JST.) The opening theme song is "Jibun Kakumei" (自分革命; My Own Revolution) by Shishamo, while the ending theme song is "Rōrō" (朗朗; Resonant) by Satō. Sentai Filmworks licensed the series in North America, Australia and British Isles for streaming on Hidive; Hidive would later announce on June 30, 2025, that the series will receive an English dub set to premiere July 16 of the same year.

==== Episodes ====
| No. | Title | Directed by | Written by | Storyboarded by | Original release date |
|---|---|---|---|---|---|
| 1 | "Hana and Mizuki"; Transliteration: "Hana to Mizuki" (Japanese: 花奈と瑞希) | Ayumu Uwano | Kazuyuki Fudeyasu | Ayumu Uwano | January 8, 2025 |
Hana Haruyama develops a love for storytelling after watching a recital of An Asura in Spring by child actress Shura Saionji in her youth, and she hones it upon enrolling at Sumomogaoka High School. She is scouted by a student named Mizuki Usurai, who invites her to the school's Broadcasting Club after seeing her skills, though Hana is reluctant to accept her offer. At the school's entrance ceremony, Hana is left in awe with Mizuki's reading of a poem on the school's intercom. The two meet while heading home and Mizuki questions Hana's downtrodden behavior as she stays in her house for the night. Hana's mother elaborates to Mizuki on Hana having no friends growing up and requests her to be her friend. Hana later admits to Mizuki on her self-loathing demeanor; the next day, Mizuki encounters Hana emotionally reciting An Asura in Spring in the rain. Awed at her delivery, Mizuki convinces her again to join the Broadcasting Club to put her skills to use and find her identity, and Hana eagerly accepts.
| 2 | "Interest and Talent"; Transliteration: "Suki to Sainō" (Japanese: 好きと才能) | Tomoki Nakagami | Kazuyuki Fudeyasu | Ayumu Uwano | January 15, 2025 |
Hana is welcomed to the Broadcasting Club and Mizuki conducts an orientation of introducing themselves to their partner. Hana wonders what her strengths are as she demonstrates her recitation to her partner Shūdai Tōga, impressing him and fellow club member Matsuyuki Akiyama; however, another member An Natsue remains unconvinced of Hana's dedication as she recites Matsuyuki's introduction with clarity, awing Hana. Mizuki shows the club the school's broadcasting room where they will be conducting activities as vice president Ryōko Totonoi advises them to choose a category for the upcoming broadcasting competition. The club conducts vocal exercises, during which Hana and Natsue pair up and get off to a rocky start. Seeing their strained banter, Ryōko asks them to take turns in reading Night on the Galactic Railroad, where Natsue becomes shocked on being immersed to Hana's storytelling. Natsue decides to engage in a feud with Hana as they meet their club advisor Hiromi Kichijōji.
| 3 | "Dreams and a Sleepover"; Transliteration: "Yume to Otomari" (Japanese: 夢とお泊まり) | Akari Ranzaki | Kazuyuki Fudeyasu | Akari Ranzaki | January 22, 2025 |
The first-years are introduced to Kichijōji's eccentricity and laidback attitude as he teaches them accentuation in reciting while critiquing their skills. Hana asks if she can read only for fun, and Kichijōji replies it is her choice as he screens a copy of a reading by an adult Shura for them to use as practice, taking Hana by surprise and leaving her nervous for the upcoming competition. Mizuki catches up and invites her for a sleepover at her house while teasing Hana to call her by her first name. When Hana opens up on her worries on her dedication to reading, Mizuki admits she was not into recitation before until she was inspired by Kichijōji's skills, driving her to win the competition. Mizuki later recites a passage from Ten Nights of Dreams that puts Hana in a trance and Mizuki reassures her passion for reading. Reaffirmed by her words, Hana asks if she can call her by her first name, which Mizuki gleefully accepts.
| 4 | "A First and a Friend"; Transliteration: "Hajimete to Tomodachi" (Japanese: 初めてと友達) | Tomoaki Takatsudo | Naoto Taniuchi | Tomoaki Takatsudo | January 29, 2025 |
After vocal practice, Natsue expresses her doubt on Hana using Sarashina Diary for the competition due to the judgment towards classic literature being difficult, leading Hana to consult with Mizuki and her friends for their inputs. Mizuki suggests to Hana on joining the day's school broadcast as a way to build up confidence, and Hana reluctantly agrees. During the broadcast, Mizuki conducts improvisations, causing Hana to stutter due to her insistence on sticking to a script. Hana later forms a bond with her classmate Miyuko Nekoi after Miyuko reassures her to act natural for the next school broadcast and reiterates on her and Hana being friends. Hana meets Ryōko and Setarō Hakoyama in the broadcasting room, where Ryōko points out classic literature has its appeal if its meaning is understood. Ryōko recites an excerpt of Sarashina Diary and shares she likes reading classic literature, adding she does not care about the opinions of others. Ryōko then decides to assist Hana in her next school broadcast, allowing Hana to naturally answer Ryōko's improvised questions.
| 5 | "Blue Spring and an Umbrella"; Transliteration: "Aoharu to Amagasa" (Japanese: アオハルと雨傘) | Hiroki Nagashima | Kazuyuki Fudeyasu | Ryōsuke Shibuya | February 5, 2025 |
Kichijōji tasks the club to choose their piece for the competition, leading an excited Hana to pick Counting the Blue Spring as her choice. Natsue expresses her disdain on Hana's choice and urges her to read a different piece, but Hana remains determined on reading Counting the Blue Spring. As she wonders on Natsue's strict demeanor, Hana decides to catch up to Natsue after school, where Hana declares her determination and shares Natsue can read whatever she likes. Natsue becomes offended at Hana's statements, and remarks she has no intention on befriending the club, leaving Hana disheartened. Despite this, Hana asks Natsue what she should do to be acknowledged, and Natsue replies she should prove her worth to her. Hana recites an excerpt of Counting the Blue Spring clearly to Natsue after school, stunning the latter. Natsue then opens up to Hana on her reason in joining the club and begins acknowledging and befriending Hana, much to Hana's delight.
| 6 | "Scripts and a Pancake"; Transliteration: "Genkō to Pankēki" (Japanese: 原稿とパンケーキ) | Ken'ichi Domon | Naoto Taniuchi | Ken'ichi Domon & Ayumu Uwano | February 12, 2025 |
The Broadcasting Club's members enlist themselves on their specialties for the competition, and the first-years decide to film a drama at Tōga's insistence, with Matsuyuki writing the script. As Hana tries to choose an excerpt from her piece, Hakoyama advises her that she should not be limited by her choices; upon seeing Kichijōji give his recommendations to Hakoyama's piece, Hana also asks for Kichijōji's advice. Hana is later approached by Matsuyuki for an interview as his competition piece, where Matsuyuki opens up on wanting to feel acknowledged. He asks Hana to do a recital with the club invited to watch. Hana conducts her recital to a group of children, leaving Matsuyuki and the club impressed. Matsuyuki expresses admiration on Hana's willingness to set up the recital, and the club leaves ahead of Hana. Matsuyuki later receives a message from his sister that she has secured tickets to an event.
| 7 | "Big Sister and Little Brother"; Transliteration: "Ane to Otōto" (Japanese: 姉と弟) | Komao Yukihiro | Naoto Taniuchi | Tomomi Mochizuki | February 19, 2025 |
Matsuyuki accomplishes the script and showcases it to the club, leading Mizuki to assign the staff and cast. Hana, Natsue, and Matsuyuki are chosen to be the actors, surprising Matsuyuki though he reluctantly accepts. The club begins filming where Matsuyuki proves to be an amateur actor compared to Hana and Natsue, but Tōga urges him to press on. After hours of practicing and being inspired by Hana's acting, Matsuyuki decides to attend his sister's event. Sometime later, Mizuki and Ryōko enlists the Broadcasting Club to a joint practice session with other schools. They are then reminded of Shura's upcoming recital, when Matsuyuki offers to invite them due his sister Owari Konoyono writing the piece. The girls accept his invitation and join him to the venue, where Matsuyuki reunites with Owari. The group finds their seats and prepares themselves as Shura enters the stage.
| 8 | "Satisfaction and Unfinished"; Transliteration: "Manzoku to Mi-kansei" (Japanese: 満足と未完成) | Sayaka Tsuji | Naoto Taniuchi | Sayaka Tsuji & Hiroki Nagashima | February 26, 2025 |
Shura delivers her recital with emotion and conviction that shocks Hana and the Broadcasting Club. Hana later admits to the club of her frustration at being humbled by Shura's skills and strives to improve. Meanwhile, Tōga and Hakoyama edit the film and Tōga decides to recompose the ending music, despite the club's observation that the music is fine as it is. Kichijōji advises Tōga of the film's deadline and its nature as a competition entry, and he gives him time to recompose by the end of school the next day. Hana, Mizuki and Hakoyama assist Tōga on his objective, where Hakoyama asks about his obsession for detail. Tōga admits that he seeks a vision to create something grand and not settle for less, revealing that he abandoned playing piano after hearing the complex production of Vocaloid works. Hakoyama reassures him that the skills he regards as ordinary are something he can be proud of, as they reunite with Hana and Mizuki playing a piano by the coast. Tōga becomes struck with inspiration and recomposes the film's music in time for the club to submit it.
| 9 | "Matching Charms and a Falling-Out"; Transliteration: "Osoroi to Sure Chigai" (Japanese: お揃いとすれ違い) | Mitsumoto Kitamura | Naoto Taniuchi | Ryōsuke Shibuya | March 5, 2025 |
The Broadcasting Club arrives at the practice session, and the group splits to attend their respective specialties. While practicing her recitation with Mizuki, Ryōko, and Hakoyama, Hana befriends students Xiang Ling and Misaki Kumori. Misaki decides to accompany Hana as they join Natsue during lunch break, where Hana realizes that Misaki was Natsue's childhood friend. As Misaki reminisces to Hana on spending middle school with Natsue and recites a passage she had given her, Natsue bluntly criticizes Misaki's failure to improve her recitation before leaving, shaking Misaki's composure. Natsue returns upon being reminded of her former bond with Misaki, as the latter requests her to listen to the passage at her current level. Misaki admits she leaned on Natsue for guidance in their middle school competition, despite Natsue's insistence that she reached it by her own skills. Misaki promises she will improve to reach Natsue's level, delighting the latter.
| 10 | "Orange Blossoms and Resolve"; Transliteration: "Tachibana to Kakugo" (Japanese: 橘と覚悟) | Kazuki Kawagishi | Naoto Taniuchi | Tomomi Mochizuki & Ayumu Uwano | March 12, 2025 |
| 11 | "Friends and Family"; Transliteration: "Nakama to Kazoku" (Japanese: 仲間と家族) | Hiroki Nagashima & Yuki Tateno | Kazuyuki Fudeyasu | Shinpei Nagai | March 19, 2025 |
| 12 | "Hana and Shura"; Transliteration: "Hana to Shura" (Japanese: 花奈と修羅) | Tomoaki Takatsudo & Ayumu Uwano | Kazuyuki Fudeyasu | Tomoaki Takatsudo & Ayumu Uwano | March 26, 2025 |

== Reception ==
The first volume was recommended by the VTuber Hoshimachi Suisei.

== See also ==
- Sound! Euphonium, a novel series also written by Ayano Takeda
- There's No Freaking Way I'll be Your Lover! Unless..., a light novel series whose manga adaptation is also illustrated by Musshu
- Tune In to the Midnight Heart, another manga series which follows a similar premise
