= A Star Brighter Than the Sun =

Japanese manga series

- First tankōbon volume cover, featuring Koki Kamishiro

太陽よりも眩しい星 (Taiyō Yori mo Mabushii Hoshi)
- Genre: Romance
- Manga
- Written by: Kazune Kawahara
- Published by: Shueisha
- English publisher: NA: Viz Media
- Imprint: Margaret Comics
- Magazine: Bessatsu Margaret
- Original run: June 11, 2021 – present
- Volumes: 15
- Anime television series
- A Star Brighter Than the Sun (2025–present)
- icon

A Star Brighter Than the Sun (Japanese: 太陽よりも眩しい星, Hepburn: Taiyō Yori mo Mabushii Hoshi) is a Japanese manga series written and illustrated by Kazune Kawahara. It began serialization in Shueisha's shōjo manga magazine Bessatsu Margaret in June 2021. An anime television series adaptation produced by Studio Kai aired from October to December 2025. A second season has been announced.

== Plot ==
Sae Iwata and Koki Kamishiro are two teenagers who are childhood friends. One day, Sae, who has had a crush on Koki since they were young, discovers that he has become tall and popular just before their upcoming middle school graduation. Afterward, they attend the same high school as classmates. As such, Sae tries to navigate her feelings for Koki.

== Characters ==
Sae Iwata (岩田 朔英, Iwata Sae)
Voiced by: Sayumi Suzushiro (PV), Minori Fujidera (anime) (Japanese); Isabella Crovetti (English)
Koki Kamishiro (神城 光輝, Kamishiro Kōki)
Voiced by: Shunsuke Takeuchi (PV), Yūki Ono (anime) (Japanese); Maxwell Donovan, Anjali Kunapaneni (young) (English)
Hisui Onodera (小野寺 翡翠, Onodera Hisui)
Voiced by: Hina Yōmiya (Japanese); Yuuki Luna (English)
Yota Ayukawa (鮎川 陽太, Ayukawa Yōta)
Voiced by: Taito Ban (Japanese); Stephen Fu (English)
Mio Kagawa (香川 美織, Kagawa Mio)
Voiced by: Mutsumi Tamura (Japanese); Anjali Kunapaneni (English)
Yushin Izawa (井沢 優心, Izawa Yūshin)
Voiced by: Ryōta Ōsaka (Japanese); Caleb Yen (English)
Subaru Kamishiro (神城 昴, Kamishiro Subaru)
Voiced by: Haruka Shiraishi (Japanese); Cherami Leigh (English)

== Media ==
=== Manga ===
Written and illustrated by Kazune Kawahara, A Star Brighter Than the Sun began serialization in Shueisha's shōjo manga magazine Bessatsu Margaret on June 11, 2021. The series' chapters have been collected into fifteen tankōbon volumes as of September 2026. In May 2024, Viz Media announced that they licensed the series for English publication.

No.	Original release date	Original ISBN	English release date	English ISBN
1	October 25, 2021	978-4-08-844539-7	March 4, 2025	978-1-9747-5166-2
1. "The Day I Reached Out My Hand"; 2. "Call My Name"; 3. "Secret"; 4. "A Star Brighter Than the Sun"
2	February 25, 2022	978-4-08-844579-3	June 3, 2025	978-1-9747-5501-1
5. "He's Still There Even when I Close My Eyes"; 6. "Jumping and Swinging"; 7. "Friends"; 8. "Brains, Heart, and Courage"
3	June 23, 2022	978-4-08-844612-7	September 2, 2025	978-1-9747-5787-9
9. "Sun Shower"; 10. "Behind the Scenes"; 11. "The Beginning of Summer"; 12. "Ten Years"
4	October 25, 2022	978-4-08-844698-1	December 2, 2025	978-1-9747-5788-6
13. "Resolve"; 14. "Someone's Feelings"; 15. "Preparation"; 16. "Rumors"
5	February 24, 2023	978-4-08-844707-0	March 3, 2026	978-1-9747-6222-4
17. "A Star That Won't Become a Constellation"; 18. "A Star Brighter Than the Sun Again"; 19. "Fireworks"; 20. "We're Dating!"
6	June 23, 2023	978-4-08-844750-6	June 2, 2026	978-1-9747-6357-3
21. "I Lose"; 22. "As Long as You Love Me"; 23. "Study Session"; 24. "Christmas Present"
7	October 25, 2023	978-4-08-844836-7	September 1, 2026	978-1-9747-6527-0
25. "Our Christmas at 16"; 26. "First Kiss"; 27. "Tearful Valentine's Day"; 28. "Sleepover"
8	February 22, 2024	978-4-08-844873-2	December 1, 2026	978-1-9747-6557-7
9	July 25, 2024	978-4-08-843028-7	—	—
10	November 25, 2024	978-4-08-843061-4	—	—
11	April 24, 2025	978-4-08-843129-1	—	—
12	August 25, 2025	978-4-08-843169-7	—	—
13	December 24, 2025	978-4-08-843213-7	—	—
14	May 25, 2026	978-4-08-843263-2	—	—
15	September 25, 2026	978-4-08-843297-7	—	—

=== Anime ===
An anime television series adaptation was announced on February 10, 2025. It was produced by Studio Kai and directed by Sayaka Kobayashi, with series composition by Yasuhiro Nakanishi, characters designed by Jinfeng Zeng, and music composed by Natsumi Tabuchi and Miki Sakurai. The series aired from October 2 to December 18, 2025, on TBS and its affiliates. The opening theme song is "Stellar Days", performed by Motohiro Hata, while the ending theme song is "Saishin-wa" (最新話; 'Latest Episode'), performed by Wanuka. Amazon Prime Video is streaming the series worldwide. Following the airing of the final episode, a second season was announced.

== Reception ==
The series was nominated for the 12th An An Manga Award in 2021. It later won the 14th edition in 2023. The series was also ranked eighth in the 2023 edition of Takarajimasha's Kono Manga ga Sugoi! guidebook for the best manga for female readers. The series was nominated for the 50th Kodansha Manga Award in the shōjo category in 2026.
