= A Star Brighter Than the Sun (TV series) =

- 太陽よりも眩しい星; Taiyō Yori mo Mabushii Hoshi
- Genre: Romance
- Based on: A Star Brighter Than the Sun by Kazune Kawahara
- Screenplay by: Yasuhiro Nakanishi
- Directed by: Sayaka Kobayashi
- Voices of: Minori Fujidera; Yūki Ono; Hina Yōmiya; Taito Ban; Mutsumi Tamura; Ryōta Ōsaka; Haruka Shiraishi
- Music by: Natsumi Tabuchi; Miki Sakurai
- Country of origin: Japan
- Original language: Japanese
- No. of seasons: 1
- No. of episodes: 12

Production
- Animator: Studio Kai
- Running time: 24 minutes
- Production company: "A Star Brighter Than the Sun" Production Committee (Note: Consisting of various companies)

Original release
- Network: JNN (TBS)
- Release: October 2, 2025 – present

A Star Brighter Than the Sun (Japanese: 太陽よりも眩しい星, Hepburn: Taiyō Yori mo Mabushii Hoshi) is a Japanese anime television series based on the romance manga series A Star Brighter Than the Sun, written and illustrated by Kazune Kawahara. It was animated and produced by Studio Kai, with direction by Sayaka Kobayashi. It follows two childhood friends who attend the same high school as classmates.

The first season aired from October to December 2025, on TBS and its affiliates. A second season was announced following the conclusion of the first season. Amazon Prime Video is streaming the series worldwide.

== Premise ==
A Star Brighter Than the Sun follows the blooming relationship between two childhood friends, Sae Iwata (voiced by Minori Fujidera) and Koki Kamishiro (voiced by Yūki Ono); who are now teenagers. The first season mainly centers around Sae's feelings for Koki.

== Episodes ==
No.	Title	Directed by (Note: Production staff information is taken from the ending credits of each episode.)	Storyboarded by	Original release date
1	"The Day I Reached Out My Hand"; Transliteration: "Te o Nobashita Hi" (Japanese: 手を伸ばした日)	Sayaka Kobayashi	Sayaka Kobayashi	October 2, 2025
Sae Iwata recalls her time in elementary school with her childhood friend Koki Kamishiro. They fell in love, while Sae encouraged him to grow up. Koki trained hard to grow up and joined the soccer team. When they entered middle school, Koki had grown up so fast that he was attracting other girls. In the lead-up to the sports festival in her third year of middle school, Sae and Koki served as the representatives for their class, working together on the banner, and afterwards have a conversation about their relationship. During scavenger hunt event of the sports festival, Sae chooses her friend instead of Koki when drawing a card looking for someone she loves, while Koki brings Sae when he drew a card that has him looking for a cute girl, which he does not reveal until after the event. Months later, Sae and Koki graduate from middle school and end up in the same class at Hokkaido North High School.
2	"Call My Name"; Transliteration: "Namae wo Yonde" (Japanese: 名前を呼んで)	Hisaya Takabayashi	Hisaya Takabayashi	October 9, 2025
On the first day of high school, Sae tears her skirt, prompting Koki to lend her his hoodie to cover up the tear, which Sae returns the next day. Sometime later, the class is assigned to groups for trash pickup with Sae and Koki in the same group, along with Hisui Onodera, Mio Kagawa, Yushin Izawa, and Yota Ayukawa. During the pickup, Koki calls Sae by her first name that raises suspicion by the rest of the group. The next day, Sae tries out for the judo club despite saying that she intends to join the tennis club, and Koki notices her absence due to the soccer and tennis teams practicing next to each other. Days later, the students have their first midterm exams and they both pass their exams, with Koki pointing out how smart Sae is despite only looking at her test score in her strongest subject. With the school trip coming up, Koki asks Sae to be in the same group, but Sae is hesitant due to the attention she would bring to herself. They end up in the same group, and afterwards Sae admits to Hisui that she has had a crush on Koki since elementary school.
3	"No Matter How Far"; Transliteration: "Donna ni Tōkute mo" (Japanese: どんなに遠くても)	Fumiaki Usui & Sayaka Kobayashi	Sayaka Kobayashi	October 16, 2025
The class goes on the school trip. While Sae remembers Koki for easily getting carsick, he has since gotten over it. As the class checks into their hotel, Sae recalls more memories about Koki and especially remembers how he smiled at everybody as she keeps staring at him. Afterwards, the class goes to the youth center to prepare a presentation about products featuring local ingredients. As the group prepares to leave the youth center, Hisui tells Mio in private letting her know that Koki sees both of them as friends. Meanwhile, Sae and Koki are shopping for souvenirs at the gift shop, and Sae gets a cut on her forehead after failing to stop a bottle of wine another student accidentally knocked off the shelf from breaking. Afterwards, the class returns to the hotel and as the students prepare for bedtime, Sae and Koki go out in the courtyard. Sae asks about Kokis crush whom he says is 'Brighter than the Sun', and tells him that his crush is certain to like him back, before they're interrupted by the others.
4	"He's Still There Even When I Close My Eyes"; Transliteration: "Mabuta Tojite mo Soko ni Aru" (Japanese: まぶた閉じてもそこに在る)	Natsumi Yasue	Ichizō Kobayashi	October 23, 2025
As the students go to bed, Sae tells Hisui and Mio that she plans to avoid talking to Koki. The next morning, Sae is approached by Koki during breakfast that immediately throws her plan off track. Sae gives her group's presentation before the class leaves the hotel. Afterwards, the class goes on a marathon run through the forest in boy-girl pairs. Not wanting to be paired up with Koki, Sae chooses Yota to be her partner, while Koki ends up with Mio. However, they cross paths again when Sae and Yota struggle to put a fallen bird feeder back on the tree. The trip concludes with the class rowing boats down the river, with Sae and Koki ending up in the same boat after being left out by the others. The two row together and the boat capsizes that has Koki having to pull Sae out of the water. Afterwards, Koki tells Sae to not distance herself for his sake and to keep on talking as friends, and Sae agrees to keep being friends with Koki.
5	"Jumping and Swinging"; Transliteration: "Hanete, Yuraide" (Japanese: 跳ねて、揺らいで)	Madoka Yaguchi	Ichizō Kobayashi	October 30, 2025
Following a physical test in gym class, Sae sees how much she has grown. Afterwards, the homeroom teacher announces the school's class jump rope competition, and Sae and Koki have been chosen as the rope swingers. Class 1-A practices, but Mio keeps on messing up. After Sae spots Mio practicing in private using an imaginary jump rope, she and her circle of friends practice together with Mio for the rest of the afternoon. The next day, the class continues to practice during gym class with improved results. After class, Sae and Koki share hand cream after swinging the rope for a long time that causes Sae to get flustered. On the day of the competition, class 1-A wins the first-year division with 178 jumps. After school, Sae spaces out during tennis practice and realizes something is wrong with her mind after Koki dislodges a ball stuck in the fence for her.
6	"Brains, Heart, and Courage"; Transliteration: "Chie to Kokoro to, Sorekara Yūki" (Japanese: 知恵と心と、それから勇気)	Kōichirō Takatsu	Aimi Yamauchi	November 6, 2025
Sae, Hisui, and Mio eat at a ramen restaurant along with Koki and his soccer teammates. Koki orders extra noodles for Sae that causes her to be unsure about her relationship with him. After dinner, Sae admits that she is fine with just being friends, but Hisui and Mio tell her to continue building a romantic relationship. The next day, Sae stays home dealing with stomach cramps as Koki drops by to lend her his notes to study from, with Sae doing the same the next day after Koki sprains his ankle during soccer practice. Afterwards, Sae decides that she will confess her feelings. The next day, the class prepares for the English Festival with the class choosing to do a play for The Wizard of Oz in English with Hisui and Koki cast as leads, and Sae as a stagehand. The class practices the play and Koki struggles with his lines due to his poor English fluency, but he is determined to practice hard to get better. On Sunday, Sae meets with Koki at a park the two used to play at as kids to practice his lines when it suddenly starts raining with Koki lending Sae his jacket.
7	"Sun-Shower"; Transliteration: "Tenki Ame" (Japanese: 天気雨)	Shigatsu Yoshikawa	Kenji Setō	November 13, 2025
Sae and Koki spend the day practicing for the play, and Koki talks about his love for American films and invites her to watch some of them over the summer. As preparations for the festival come along, Koki greatly improves his delivery. On the day of the festival, Sae notices that three students sitting up front try to take a perverted photo of Hisui and interrupts the play to stop them, ruining the performance. While cleaning up, Koki overhears those said students and gets in a fight with them and gets in trouble. But Koki's female cousin Subaru Kamishiro comes to his defense, convincing the teachers that it was an act of self-defense. On the following Sunday, the class holds a post-festival party at a yakiniku restaurant with Koki joining after his match that day. During the party, Ayukawa talks with Sae about his life in the countryside he grew up in, and he chose to attend this school because of the lack of a pool. On the train ride home after the party, Sae and Koki talk about the movie they want to see. Koki also asks about Sae's talk with Ayukawa.
8	"Ten Years"; Transliteration: "Jūnenkan" (Japanese: 10年間)	Koto	Sayaka Kobayashi	November 20, 2025
Summer arrives, and following tennis practice, Sae meets Ayukawa inside the clubroom for the Shogi Club, which Ayukawa is currently the only member. Sae and Ayukawa have a match and never having played shogi before, Sae loses. Afterwards Koki arrives after finishing soccer practice to let her know about his practice schedule in the summer. The next day, Sae meets up with Subaru, who talks about Koki's growth and how he used to be very childish. A few days later, Sae and Koki go out together to see a movie. Afterwards, the two have dinner and Koki tells Sae that it has been ten years since the two first met. After dinner, while Koki is using the restroom, Sae helps two guys with directions, and Koki mistakenly thinks they were hitting on her. This has Sae realizing that Koki has been looking out for her. Meanwhile, Hisui and Mio speak about the upcoming school festival.
9	"Someone's Feelings"; Transliteration: "Dareka no Kimochi" (Japanese: 誰かの気持ち)	Yuhi Suzuki	Kenji Setō	November 27, 2025
Hisui and Mio tell Sae about the after party for the festival where couples confess their love when their requested song plays. Preparations for the festival begin with Mio and Izawa nominated as committee members and Subaru appointed as the committee chair. As first-year classes do classroom exhibits, Sae's class debates on their theme. As Sae goes to tennis practice, she passes by a piece of artwork has been scribbled on, and Koki comes to her defense when Subaru was about to accuse Sae. The next day, the class decides on space as the theme of their exhibit. After school, Hisui tells Sae and Mio that Izawa startled her when he told her he had something to say at the after party and was rejected, running out to the riverbank afterwards. Koki goes after Izawa and tells him that he needs to take his role as a committee member more seriously. Afterwards, Izawa apologizes and promises to devote himself to the festival.
10	"Rumors"; Transliteration: "Uwasa" (Japanese: 噂)	Kōichirō Takatsu	Takashi Sano	December 4, 2025
11	"A Star Without a Constellation"; Transliteration: "Seiza ni Naranai Hoshi" (Japanese: 星座にならない星)	Sayaka Kobayashi	Sayaka Kobayashi	December 11, 2025
12	"A Star Brighter Than the Sun"; Transliteration: "Taiyō Yori mo Mabushii Hoshi" (Japanese: 太陽よりも眩しい星)	Sayaka Kobayashi	Imamura	December 18, 2025

== Music ==
The music for the series is composed by Natsumi Tabuchi and Miki Sakurai. The anime's opening theme song is "Stellar Days", performed by Motohiro Hata, while the ending theme song is "Saishin-wa" (最新話; 'Latest Episode'), performed by Wanuka.

== Reception ==
Audrey Im of Anime Trending reviewed the first episode of the series. While praising the anime for its humor, she considered that Iwata's insecurity of her size was emphasized in several scenes, writing "Though Iwata's love for food and insecurity of her size is highlighted in several scenes [...] [I] appreciated how the show doesn't seem to make fun of these qualities. Iwata's fatness and tallness aren't being poked at under the guise of comedic relief; instead, her sensitivity toward these traits is displayed in a fashion that is so emblematic of teenage insecurity."
