= Waccha PriMagi! =

Japanese arcade game

ワッチャプリマジ! (Watcha PuriMaji!)
- Genre: Magical girl Idol
- Manga
- Written by: Hitsuji Tsujinaga
- Published by: Shogakukan
- Magazine: 'Ciao'
- Original run: September 2021 – October 2022
- Video game
- Developer: Syn Sophia
- Publisher: Takara Tomy Arts
- Genre: Rhythm, Dress-up
- Platform: Arcade
- Released: October 1, 2021
- Anime television series
- Directed by: Junichi Sato; Kosuke Kobayashi
- Written by: Fumi Tsubota
- Music by: Hiromi Mizutani
- Studio: Tatsunoko Production; DongWoo A&E
- Licensed by: HK: TVB; NA: Sentai Filmworks
- Original network: TXN (TV Tokyo), BS TV Tokyo, AT-X
- Original run: October 3, 2021 – October 9, 2022
- Episodes: 51
- Other series
- Pretty Rhythm: Aurora Dream (2011); Pretty Rhythm: Dear My Future (2012); Pretty Rhythm: Rainbow Live (2013); PriPara (2014); Idol Time PriPara (2017); Kiratto Pri☆Chan (2018); Waccha PriMagi! (2021); Himitsu no AiPri (2024); Onegai AiPri (2026)

Waccha PriMagi! (ワッチャプリマジ!, Waccha Purimaji!) is a Japanese arcade game by Takara Tomy Arts. It is the successor to Kiratto Pri☆Chan and the fourth entry in Takara Tomy's Pretty Series.

An anime television series adaptation by Tatsunoko Production and DongWoo A&E began airing from October 3, 2021, to October 9, 2022, It was followed by Himitsu no AiPri on April 7, 2024.

== Plot ==
Matsuri Hibino is a first-year junior high school student who loves PriMagi, a form of entertainment involving music and dance. Suddenly, the magician Myamu appears and scouts her out to participate in PriMagi. The two of them work together and aim to become the top Primagista.

=== Characters ===
Matsuri Hibino (陽比野 まつり, Hibino Matsuri)
Voiced by: Chinatsu Hirose
A bright, lively and free-spirited first-year junior high school student who loves PriMagi and festivals. When she performs as a Primagista, she's immediately able to unleash a great amount of magic. She is very driven to become a top Primagista. Her preferred brand is LOVELY MELODY. Her birthday is on August 8th.
Hina Yayoi (弥生ひな, Yayoi Hina)
Voiced by: Aya Uchida
A stylish, passionate, straightforward and energetic third-year junior high school student at Arawashi School, a powerful school for Primagistas. She lost to Jennifer during the previous PriMagi Grand Festival but she's trying her hardest to beat her. Her preferred brand is VIVID STAR.
Lemon Kokoa (心愛れもん, Kokoa Remon)
Voiced by: Anna Suzuki
A shy but knowledgeable second-year junior high school student who is an aspiring PriMagi otaku. Her preferred brand is Radiant Abyss.
Miruki Amauri (甘瓜みるき, Amauri Miruki)
Voiced by: Mayu Sagara
A deceptively cute second-year junior high school student. She acts cute but in reality, she is mischievous and tries to sabotage Matsuri and Myamu on multiple occasions. She is intimidated by Hina. Her dream is to build a Milky Cute Museum. Her preferred brand is Cherry Sugar.
Amane Sumeragi (皇あまね, Sumeragi Amane)
Voiced by: Umeka Shōji
An elegant and talented third-year junior high school student whom the younger students respect. Her preferred brand is Eternal Revue.
Auru Omega (御芽河あうる, Omega Auru)
Voiced by: Minori Fujidera
A genius child prodigy. She knows a great deal about mechanics and technology, Auru greatly values efficiency and research data, and as a result, her words and decisions may come off as cold or blunt. Her preferred brand is ELECTRO REMIX.
Jennifer Sumire Sol (ジェニファー・純恋・ソル, Jenifā・Sumire・Soru)
Voiced by: Saho Aono
She was the winner of the previous PriMagi Grand Festival and a high-class Primagista whom Matsuri admires. She is passionate and fabulous, and often acts like a celebrity. She holds great love for PriMagi. Her preferred brand is SHINING DIVA.

=== Partners ===
Myamu (みゃむ, Myamu)
Voiced by: Riko Koike
Matsuri's magician partner struggles to control her incredible magic abilities. She is very supportive, competitive and fears abandonment. She can assume the form of a light blue kitten. Her preferred brand is LOVELY MELODY. She also shares her birthday with Matsuri.
Chimumu (チムム, Chimumu)
Voiced by: Rie Hikisaka
Hina's magician partner.
Carron (きゃろん, Kyaron)
Voiced by: Sunao Yoshikawa
Lemon's magician partner.
Hanitan (はにたん, Hanitan)
Voiced by: Yui Ogura
Miruki's magician partner.
Patano (ぱたの, Patano)
Voiced by: Konomi Kohara
Amane's magician partner.
Tatejima (タテジマ, Tatejima)
Voiced by: Kanae Itō
Auru's owl-like robot partner.

=== Others ===
Tōma Ibuki (伊吹橙真, Ibuki Tōma)
Voiced by: Gakuto Kajiwara, Natsumi Fujiwara (child)
Matsuri's childhood friend who cares deeply for her, and he always tries his best to support her in her troubled times.
Hughie (ひゅーい, Hyūi)
Voiced by: Atsushi Tamaru
A mysterious blue wolf who seems to know Myamu. He seems to be capricious and playful, often teasing Toma and Myamu, but loves PriMagi very much.
Ruhme (リューメ, Ryūme)
Voiced by: Hina Yōmiya
Jennifer's magician partner.
Achihiko Omega (御芽河阿智彦, Omega Achihiko)
Voiced by: Hikaru Midorikawa
Auru's father and the CEO of the Omega Corporation.
Meganee (めが姉ぇ, Meganee)
Voiced by: Kanae Itō
Auru's assistant working at the Omega Corporation.

== Media ==
=== Arcade game ===
PriMagi arcade games were launched on October 1, 2021. It was developed by syn Sophia and published by Takara Tomy. A player can create a character and progress by performing live shows.

=== Anime ===
The anime was first announced in June 2021 to celebrate Pretty Rhythm's 10th anniversary, with an October 2021 release date, alongside the release of its arcade game around the same time. The series was produced by Tatsunoko Production and DongWoo Animation and initially aired on TV Tokyo and on the TX Network from October 3rd, 2021 to October 9, 2022. Prior to its initial broadcast, in September 2021, Sentai Filmworks announced that it will be streaming the anime on its HIDIVE streaming platform in North America, Australia, and the British Isles, while around the same time, TVB acquired licenses to the series in Hong Kong and streamed it on MyTV Super as it aired on TVB Jade. MBC also aired the series in South Korea a year later in late 2022.

Sentai later released the anime onto home video via Section23 in June 2023, making it the only series from the Pretty Rhythm franchise to stream on HIDIVE while also having a home video release from Sentai Filmworks.

No.	Title	Directed by (Note: Information is taken from the ending credits of each episode.)	Written by	Storyboarded by	Original release date
1	"Let's Compete in the PriMagi!"; Transliteration: "Issho ni PuriMaji Shiyo!" (Japanese: いっしょにプリマジしよ！)	Kōsuke Kobayashi	Fumi Tsubota	Kōsuke Kobayashi	October 3, 2021
2	"Here We Go! The Festival Stage"; Transliteration: "Yaru zo! Omatsuri Sutēji" (Japanese: やるぞ！おまつりステージ)	Chihiro Kumano	Isao Murayama	Tatsuhiko Komatsu	October 10, 2021
3	"A Visit from Hina, the Queen of Style!"; Transliteration: "Oshare Banchō Hina Kenzanjan!" (Japanese: おしゃれ番長・ひな見参じゃん！)	Mitsuhiro Yoneda	Fumi Tsubota	Yasuhiro Minami	October 17, 2021
4	"The Duo Disbands?! It's Way Too Soon for That!"; Transliteration: "Konbi Kaisan!? Maji Hayasugi da yō" (Japanese: コンビ解散！？ マジ早すぎだよ～)	Seo Hye-Jin	Fumi Tsubota	Jun'ichi Satō, Kōsuke Kobayashi	October 24, 2021
5	"Hey, Look! It's the Super-Duper Cute Miruki! (Heart)"; Transliteration: "Mite Mite! Kawaii Kawaii Miruki da o (Hāto)" (Japanese: みてみて！かわいい×2 みるきだお(は～と))	Shizutaka Sugawara	Mitsutaka Hirota	Shizutaka Sugawara	October 31, 2021
6	"The Dark PriMagi Superstar?! Lemon Takes the Stage!"; Transliteration: "Yami PuriMajisuta!? Remon Arawaru!" (Japanese: 闇プリマジスタ！？れもん現る！)	Daisuke Kurose	Isao Murayama	Hiroaki Shimura	November 7, 2021
7	"The Downright Merry Meowgnificent Magical Realm!"; Transliteration: "Nyan to mo Yukai ☆ Sōkai ☆ Mahōkai!" (Japanese: にゃんともユカイ☆ソーカイ☆魔法界！)	Ken'ichirō Watanabe	Michiru Tenma	Ken'ichirō Watanabe	November 14, 2021
8	"A Crash Course with Hina-senpai! OMG, OMG, I'm Doomed!"; Transliteration: "Hina-senpai no Maji Tokkun! Yabai yo Yabai yo Maji Yabai yo!" (Japanese: ひな先輩のマジ特訓！ヤバいよヤバいよマジヤバいよ！)	Mitsuhiro Yoneda	Mitsutaka Hirota	Mitsuhiro Yoneda	November 21, 2021
9	"A Heart Awakens! 'Tis the Advent of Lemon!!"; Transliteration: "Shin Kakusei! Remon Kōrin su!!" (Japanese: 心・覚醒！れもん降臨す！！)	Hiroshi Itō	Isao Murayama	Tatsuhiko Komatsu	November 28, 2021
10	"Nothing Beats the PriMagi! A Mega-Enthusiastic Meet-up!"; Transliteration: "PuriMaji Shika Katan! Gekiatsu Ofu-kai!!" (Japanese: プリマジしか勝たん！激熱オフ会！！)	Nana Imanaka	Sawako Sukegawa	Nana Imanaka	December 5, 2021
11	"Fly, Hina! Conquer Your Loneliness!"; Transliteration: "Tobe Hina! Kodoku o Koete Ike!" (Japanese: 跳べひな！孤独を超えていけ！)	Chihiro Kumano	Mitsutaka Hirota	Shizutaka Sugawara	December 12, 2021
12	"Matsuri VS Hina: Upon Whom Will the Phoenix Smile?"; Transliteration: "Matsuri Bāsasu Hina Fenikkusu wa Dochira ni Hohoemu?" (Japanese: まつりVSひなフェニックスはどちらに微笑む？)	Hiroshi Itō	Fumi Tsubota	Yasuhiro Minami	December 19, 2021
13	"The Magic Word is Waccha"; Transliteration: "Watcha Majikku Wādo" (Japanese: ワッチャ・マジックワード)	Yūji Takayama	Fumi Tsubota	Jun'ichi Satō, Kōsuke Kobayashi	December 26, 2021
Special	"I Really Understand! Waccha PriMagi Academy"; Transliteration: "Maji de Wakaru! Watcha Purimaji Gakuen" (Japanese: マジでわかる！ワッチャプリマジ学園)	N/A	N/A	N/A	January 9, 2022
14	"Passionate, Mysterious, Elegant: Amane's PriMagi"; Transliteration: "Atsuku Ayashiku Uruwashiku～Amane no PuriMaji～" (Japanese: 熱くあやしく麗しく～あまねのプリマジ～)	Mitsuhiro Yoneda	Michiru Tenma	Hiroaki Shimura	January 16, 2022
15	"So Much for That! I'm Sick of This Stupid Training Camp!"; Transliteration: "Mō Yameda! Gasshuku Nante Yatterarenai!" (Japanese: もうやめだ！合宿なんてやってられない！)	Fukutarō Takahashi	Isao Murayama	Yasuhiro Minami	January 23, 2022
16	"Touma's "Magi," Hughie's "Magi""; Transliteration: "Tōma no "Maji" Hyūi no "Maji"" (Japanese: 橙真の『マジ』ひゅーいの『マジ』)	Chihiro Kumano	Fumi Tsubota	Tatsuhiko Komatsu	January 30, 2022
17	"Says Thanks for Everything, Chimu..."; Transliteration: "Chimumu, Osewa ni Narimashita Chimu..." (Japanese: チムム、お世話になりましたチム…)	Hiroshi Itō	Mitsutaka Hirota	Hiroaki Shimura	February 6, 2022
18	"Amane's Heart, A Secret Garden"; Transliteration: "Amane no Kokoro, Himitsu no Hanazono" (Japanese: あまねの心、秘密の花園)	Katsuya Ōshima	Fumi Tsubota	Katsuya Ōshima	February 13, 2022
19	"Together! On Another Journey to the Magical Realm!"; Transliteration: "Minna de! Mata Itta no Kai ☆ Mahōkai!" (Japanese: みんなで！また行ったのカイ☆魔法界！)	Ken'ichirō Watanabe	Isao Murayama	Ken'ichirō Watanabe	February 20, 2022
20	"The Trial of a Lifetime! Miruki's Cute Court Case!"; Transliteration: "Kūzenzetsugo no! Miruki Azatoi Saiban da o!" (Japanese: 空前絶後の！みるきあざとい裁判だお！)	Daisuke Kurose	Michiru Tenma	Tatsuhiko Komatsu	February 27, 2022
21	"I am Jennifer!"; Transliteration: "Ai amu Jenifā!" (Japanese: アイ・アム・ジェニファー！)	Chihiro Kumano	Michihiro Tsuchiya	Hitomi Ezoe	March 6, 2022
22	"Tune in for a Special Broadcast! Olé!"; Transliteration: "Kinkyū Tokuban Goran Ārei!" (Japanese: 緊急特番ご覧アーレイ！)	Mitsuhiro Yoneda	Michiru Tenma	Mitsuhiro Yoneda	March 13, 2022
23	"The Final Test: A Five-Man Center!"; Transliteration: "Saigo no Shiren - Minna de Sentā!" (Japanese: 最後の試練 みんなでセンター！)	Hiroshi Itō, Fukutarō Takahashi	Isao Murayama	Jun'ichi Satō, Kōsuke Kobayashi	March 20, 2022
24	"Exhibition, Here We Come! Five Times the Magic!"; Transliteration: "Ikuzo Ekishibishon! Gonin no Maji" (Japanese: 行くぞエキシビション！5人のマジ)	Kazuko Kodama	Mitsutaka Hirota	Hitomi Ezoe, Kōsuke Kobayashi, Tatsuhiko Komatsu	March 27, 2022
Special	"It's the New Semester! Waccha PriMagi Academy"; Transliteration: "Shin Gakki da yo! Watcha Purimaji Gakuen" (Japanese: 新学期だよ！ワッチャプリマジ学園)	N/A	N/A	N/A	April 3, 2022
25	"Identity Data File: In the Case of Auru Omega"; Transliteration: "Kenshō Dēta Fairu - Omega Auru no Baai" (Japanese: 検証データFile 御芽河あうるの場合)	Daisuke Kurose	Michihiro Tsuchiya	Tatsuhiko Komatsu	April 10, 2022
26	"Auru's Eikichi Research Guide!"; Transliteration: "Auru no Eikichi Kenkyū Hakusho!" (Japanese: あうるの英吉研究白書！)	Chihiro Kumano	Isao Murayama	Ken'ichi Nishida	April 17, 2022
27	"The Fate that Binds Us"; Transliteration: "Tsunagatte Iku Unmei" (Japanese: 繋がっていく運命)	Mitsuhiro Yoneda	Fumi Tsubota	Jun'ichi Satō, Kōsuke Kobayashi	April 24, 2022
28	"You Are a My Precious One! This is Our Magic!"; Transliteration: "Kimi wa Mai Pureshasu Wan! Oretachi no Maji!" (Japanese: 君はマイ・プレシャスワン！俺たちのマジ！)	Kazuko Kodama	Fumi Tsubota	Ken'ichi Nishida	May 1, 2022
29	"Who Do You Work With? Feeling Duo Tournament"; Transliteration: "Dare to Kumu? Fīringu Dyuo Taikai" (Japanese: 誰と組む？フィーリングデュオ大会)	Fukutarō Takahashi	Michiru Tenma	Miwako Yamamoto	May 8, 2022
30	"Glasses and Contact"; Transliteration: "Megane to Kontakuto" (Japanese: めがねとコンタクト)	Chihiro Kumano	Michihiro Tsuchiya	Kō Matsuzono	May 15, 2022
31	"Magic or Technology? It's Time to Duo PriMagi!"; Transliteration: "Maji? Tekunorojī? Iza, Dyuo PuriMaji!" (Japanese: マジ？テクノロジー？いざ、デュオプリマジ！)	Mitsuhiro Yoneda	Mitsutaka Hirota	Tatsuhiko Komatsu	May 22, 2022
32	"The One and Only Flower ～Amane's Magic～"; Transliteration: "Tada Hitotsu no Hana ～Amane no Maji～" (Japanese: ただ1つの花～あまねのマジ～)	Daisuke Kurose	Michiru Tenma, Fumi Tsubota	Jun'ichi Sakata	May 29, 2022
33	"The People who Aim For the Sun"; Transliteration: "Taiyō o Mezasu Mono Tachi" (Japanese: 太陽を目指す者たち)	Hiroshi Itō	Fumi Tsubota	Ken'ichi Nishida	June 5, 2022
34	"My Own Vivid Star"; Transliteration: "Watashi Dake no Bibiddo Sutā" (Japanese: 私だけのビビッドスター)	Kazuko Kodama	Fumi Tsubota	Masaki Ōzora	June 12, 2022
35	"Soar Up! Hina and Amane's Duo!"; Transliteration: "Mai Agare! Hina to Amane no Dyuo!" (Japanese: 舞い上がれ！ひなとあまねのデュオ！)	Chihiro Kumano	Michihiro Tsuchiya	Tomoyuki Munehiro	June 19, 2022
36	"Farewell, Lemon! The Leisure of Carron"; Transliteration: "Saraba Remon! Oitoma no Kyaron" (Japanese: さらばれもん！お暇のきゃろん)	Mitsuhiro Yoneda	Isao Murayama	Hiroaki Shimura	June 26, 2022
37	"Are you OK!? Milky Lemon's Date!"; Transliteration: "Daijōbu!? Miru Remo Dēto!" (Japanese: だいじょうぶ！？みるれもデート！)	Fukutarō Takahashi	Seiya Takahashi	Hiroaki Shimura	July 3, 2022
38	"It's Admiration! This is Our Duo!"; Transliteration: "Katsumoku de gozaru! Kore ga Watashi ra no Dyuo dao!" (Japanese: かつ目でござる！これが私らのデュオだお！)	Ken'ichirō Watanabe	Isao Murayama	Ken'ichirō Watanabe	July 10, 2022
39	"The Burning Dreamer, Achihiko Omega"; Transliteration: "Shakunetsu Dorīmā Omega Achihiko" (Japanese: 灼熱ドリーマー 御芽河阿智彦)	Daisuke Kurose	Mitsutaka Hirota	Tatsuhiko Komatsu	July 17, 2022
40	"You are MY Sunshine"; Transliteration: "Yū ā Mai Sanshain" (Japanese: You are MY Sunshine)	Chihiro Kumano	Fumi Tsubota	Masaki Ōzora	July 24, 2022
41	"Is PriMagi Gone for Good!?"; Transliteration: "PuriMaji, Maji Shūryō!?" (Japanese: プリマジ、マジ終了！？)	Hiroshi Itō	Michihiro Tsuchiya	Yasushi Muroya	July 31, 2022
42	"The Distance Between Me and Magic"; Transliteration: "Sessha to Maji no Disutansu" (Japanese: せっ者とマジの距離)	Fukutarō Takahashi	Isao Murayama	Miwako Yamamoto	August 7, 2022
43	"I Want to Win! Deliver it, This Magic"; Transliteration: "Kachitai! Todoke, Kono Maji" (Japanese: 勝ちたい！届け、このマジ)	Kazuko Kodama	Mitsutaka Hirota	Ken'ichi Nishida	August 14, 2022
44	"Miruki Drea～m♡Bon Appetite (Tongue Out)"; Transliteration: "Mirukii Dori～mu♡Meshiagare (Pekori)" (Japanese: みるきぃどり～む♡めしあがれ（ぺこり）)	Mitsuhiro Yoneda	Seiya Takahashi	Tatsuhiko Komatsu	August 21, 2022
45	"The Way of Science, The Way of Auru"; Transliteration: "Kagaku no Michi, Auru no Michi" (Japanese: 科学の道、あうるの道)	Chihiro Kumano	Michihiro Tsuchiya	Kō Matsuzono	August 28, 2022
46	"Dedicated to You… "I Love You""; Transliteration: "Anata ni Sasageru… "Ai Shiteimasu"" (Japanese: 貴女に捧げる…『愛しています』)	Hiroshi Itō	Seiya Takahashi, Fumi Tsubota	Masaki Ōzora	September 4, 2022
47	"Really! The Festival is Coming Up!"; Transliteration: "Maji ka! Majika ni Semaru Fesu!" (Japanese: マジか！間近に迫るフェス！)	Ken'ichirō Watanabe	Isao Murayama	Ken'ichirō Watanabe	September 11, 2022
48	"Opening! Euphoria Revue"; Transliteration: "Kaimaku! Yūforia Rebyū" (Japanese: 開幕！ユーフォリアレビュー)	Kōsuke Kobayashi	Mitsutaka Hirota	Kōsuke Kobayashi	September 18, 2022
49	"Magicians, Magic Power, Humans"; Transliteration: "Manamana・Majipa・Chuppi" (Japanese: マナマナ・マジパ・チュッピ)	Kōsuke Kobayashi	Michihiro Tsuchiya	Kōsuke Kobayashi	September 25, 2022
50	"The Magic You Cast on Me"; Transliteration: "Kimi ga Atashi ni Kaketa Mahō" (Japanese: キミがあたしにかけた魔法)	Hiroshi Itō	Fumi Tsubota	Jun'ichi Satō	October 2, 2022
51	"Everyone, Let's Compete in the PriMagi!"; Transliteration: "Minna, Issho ni PuriMaji Shiyo!" (Japanese: みんな、いっしょにプリマジしよ！)	Mitsuhiro Yoneda	Isao Murayama	Hiroaki Shimura	October 9, 2022

=== Manga ===
A manga adaptation by Hitsuji Tsujinaga began serialization in Shogakukan's shōjo manga magazine Ciao in September 2021 to October 2022.
