= Tank Chair =

Japanese manga series

- First tankōbon volume cover, featuring Nagi Taira

戦車椅子－TANK CHAIR－ (Sensha Isu: Tanku Cheā)
- Genre: Action; Science fiction
- Manga
- Written by: Manabu Yashiro
- Published by: Kodansha
- English publisher: NA: Kodansha USA
- Imprint: Sirius KC
- Magazine: Magazine Pocket; Monthly Shōnen Sirius (November 26, 2024 – present)
- Original run: November 5, 2022 – present
- Volumes: 11
- Anime television series
- Directed by: Tadahiro Yoshihira; Hiroaki Ando
- Produced by: Kouhei Endou; Kou Tachibana; Shinji Kajiwara; Yumi Hamamoto; Yuuki Tezuka
- Written by: Tadahiro Yoshihira
- Music by: Masaru Yokoyama
- Studio: Polygon Pictures
- Licensed by: Amazon Prime Video (streaming)
- Original network: Tokyo MX, BS11, CBC TV, MBS, AT-X
- Original run: October 4, 2026 – present
- Episodes: 8
- icon

Tank Chair (Japanese: 戦車椅子－TANK CHAIR－, Hepburn: Sensha Isu: Tanku Cheā) is a Japanese manga series written and illustrated by Manabu Yashiro. It began serialization on Kodansha's Magazine Pocket website and app in November 2022. An anime television series adaptation produced by Polygon Pictures premiered in October 2026.

== Plot ==
Nagi Taira is an assassin on Guicheng Island, considered the most dangerous city in the universe. One day, he was so badly injured after saving his younger sister, Shizuka, that he has been in a coma ever since. Only when he senses the urge to kill does he awaken and transform back into a dangerous assassin—now one in a heavily armed wheelchair. Shizuka sets out to find an opponent so dangerous that Nagi will permanently awaken from his coma. This allows her to continue accepting assassination contracts, which Nagi then carries out. The riskier the missions, the better for her brother. Shizuka hopes that after a particularly grueling battle, he will be permanently cured.

== Characters ==
Nagi Taira (平良 凪, Taira Nagi)
Voiced by: Koki Uchiyama (Japanese); Conradie van Heerden^{Ep. 1 credits} (English)
Shizuka Taira (平良 静, Taira Shizuka)
Voiced by: Minori Fujidera (Japanese); Megan Berrisford^{Ep. 1 credits} (English)
Naozumi Kurosaka (黒坂直墨, Kurosaka Naozumi)
Voiced by: Gakuto Kajiwara (Japanese); Luke Bollman^{Ep. 2 credits} (English)
Touko Kurosaka (黒坂騰子, Kurosaka Touko)
Voiced by: Saori Hayami (Japanese); Ntsimedi Gwangwa^{Ep. 4 credits} (English)
Sensei (先生)
Voiced by: Megumi Ogata (Japanese); Christiaan Schoeman^{Ep. 5 credits} (English)
Uzu (渦)
Voiced by: Gen Satō (Japanese); Rob Coutts^{Ep. 5 credits} (English)
Dr. Radio (Dr.ラヂオ, Dr. Radjio)
Voiced by: Yurina Amami (Japanese); Saskia Rijke^{Ep. 6 credits} (English)

== Media ==
=== Manga ===
Written and illustrated by Manabu Yashiro, Tank Chair began serialization on Kodansha's Magazine Pocket website and app on November 5, 2022. The series was transferred to the Monthly Shōnen Sirius magazine on November 26, 2024. Its chapters have been collected into eleven tankōbon volumes as of October 2026.

During their panel at New York Comic Con 2023, Kodansha USA announced that they licensed the series for English publication in Q4 2024. Kodansha is also publishing the series in English on their K Manga service.

==== Volumes ====
No.	Original release date	Original ISBN	North American release date	North American ISBN
1	January 6, 2023	978-4-06-529923-4	September 17, 2024	979-8-88-877135-8
Targets 1–4
2	March 9, 2023	978-4-06-530885-1	December 10, 2024	979-8-88-877136-5
Targets 5–12
3	May 9, 2023	978-4-06-531501-9	March 11, 2025	979-8-88-877151-8
Targets 13–20
4	August 8, 2023	978-4-06-532456-1	June 10, 2025	979-8-88-877210-2
Targets 21–28
5	December 7, 2023	978-4-06-533825-4	September 9, 2025	979-8-88-877277-5
Targets 29–35
6	May 9, 2024	978-4-06-535447-6	January 6, 2026	979-8-88-877412-0
Targets 36–42
7	October 8, 2024	978-4-06-536993-7	March 10, 2026	979-8-88-877524-0
Targets 43–48
8	March 7, 2025	978-4-06-538702-3	May 12, 2026	979-8-88-877649-0
Targets 49–55
9	September 9, 2025	978-4-06-540629-8	August 11, 2026	979-8-88-877896-8
Targets 56–60
10	March 26, 2026	978-4-06-542776-7	May 11, 2027	979-8-90-074125-3
Targets 61–66
11	October 8, 2026	978-4-06-545121-2	—	—
Targets 67–72

=== Anime ===
An anime television series adaptation was announced on March 18, 2026. The series is produced by Polygon Pictures and directed by Tadahiro Yoshihira and Hiroaki Ando, with Yoshihira handling series composition and both working on the episode scripts, Yūki Moriyama designing the characters, and Masaru Yokoyama composing the music. It premiered on October 4, 2026, on Tokyo MX, BS11, CBC Television, and MBS. The opening theme song is "Dalala", performed by SiM, and the ending theme song is "Sync", performed by Daoko. Amazon Prime Video is exclusively streaming the series worldwide.

==== Episodes ====
No.	Episode	Directed by (Note: Production staff information is taken from the ending credits of each episode.)	Written by	Storyboard by	Original release date
1	"Episode 1"	Tadahiro Yoshihira	Tadahiro Yoshihira	Hiroaki Ando	October 4, 2026
2	"Episode 2"	Hiroaki Ando	Hiroaki Ando	Hiroaki Ando	October 11, 2026
3	"Episode 3"	Hiroaki Sasa	Tadahiro Yoshihira	Hiroyuki Shimazu	October 18, 2026
4	"Episode 4"	Hiroaki Ando	Ema	Iwao Teraoka	October 25, 2026
5	"Episode 5"	Hiroaki Sasa	Tadahiro Yoshihira	Hiroyuki Shimazu	November 1, 2026
6	"Episode 6"	Hiroaki Ando	Hiroaki Ando	Hiroaki Ando & Kazukatsu Izawa	November 8, 2026
7	"Episode 7"	Hiroaki Sasa	Tadahiro Yoshihira	Hiroyuki Shimazu	November 15, 2026
8	"Episode 8"	Hiroaki Ando	Ema	Hiroaki Ando	November 22, 2026
9	"Episode 9"	TBA	TBA	TBA	November 29, 2026

== Reception ==
The series was nominated for the ninth Next Manga Awards in the digital category in 2023. The series was also nominated for the 48th Kodansha Manga Award in the shōnen category in 2024.
