= Nagisa Saitō =

Japanese actress and model (born 2003)

Nagisa Saito
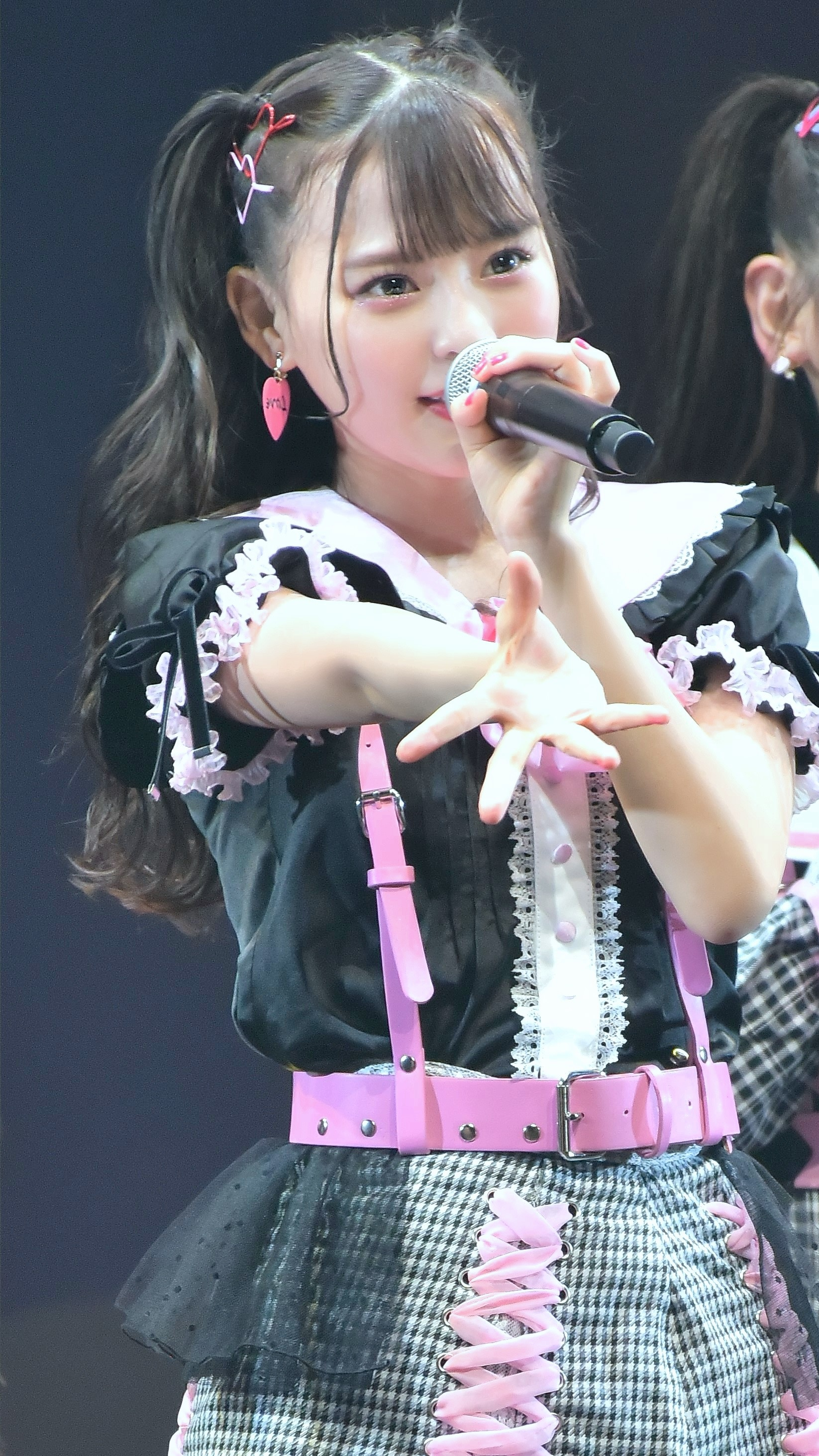
- Saito in September 2020
- Born: July 6, 2003 (age 23); Kawasaki, Kanagawa, Japan
- Occupations: Actress; model
- Years active: 2017–present
- Agent: Evergreen Entertainment
- Height: 151 cm (4 ft 11 in)
- Musical career
- Genre: J-pop
- Instrument: Vocals
- Years active: 2017–2023
- Label: Sacra Music
- Formerly of: =Love

Japanese name
- Kanji: 齊藤 なぎさ
- Hiragana: さいとう なぎさ
Transcriptions
- Romanization: Saitō Nagisa
- Website: saitonagisa-fc.jp

Nagisa Saito (齊藤 なぎさ, Saitō Nagisa; born July 6, 2003), is a Japanese actress, model, and former singer who came to prominence as a member of the idol group =Love from 2017 to 2023.

== Early life ==
Saitō was born in the Asao-ku ward of Kawasaki on July 6, 2003. She has one older sister. Saitō was bullied in elementary and junior high school, which she later said inspired her to become an idol so that she could give others in similar situations the strength that she got from the music of AKB48 during that time.

== Career ==
As a singer, Saitō became known as a member of the idol group =Love from 2017 until 2023, when she left the group to focus on her acting career. She is also a regular model for the women's fashion magazine Larme.

== Filmography ==
=== Film ===
Year	Title	Role	Notes	Ref.
2019	Summer Night Sky, Autumn Sunset, Winter Morning, and Spring Wind	Yumi Tanaka	Lead role; anthology film	
2023	Our Secret Diary	Yuko Hayashi		
2024	Koi o Shiranai Bokutachi wa	Koharu Fujimura		
2024	Atashi no!	Mitsuki Taniguchi		
2024	Oshi no Ko: The Final Act	Ruby Hoshino		
2026	Bayside Shakedown N.E.W.	Akane Sunaga		
2026	Monster in Sheep's Clothing	Miyu Nagai		

=== Television ===
Year	Title	Role	Notes	Ref.
2018	One Room of Happiness	Miyajima		
2022	Moshi Ike?	Hana Katagiri		
2022	Moshi Koi	Karin Misaki		
2022	Cinderella Again	Mao	Episode 2	
2022	Metropolitan Police Department Research Division 1	Madoka Saito	Episode 9	
2022–23	Tomorrow, I'll Be Someone's Girlfriend	Yua Takahashi	2 seasons	
2023	The Best Student: The Last Dance with One Year Left to Live	Shino Miyama	Web series	
2023	The Greatest Teacher	Shino Miyama	Episodes 1 and 5	
2024	The Reason We Fall in Love	Kyo Ozu		
2024	My Undead Yokai Girlfriend	Misa Inukai	Web drama	
2024	Oshi no Ko	Ruby Hoshino		
2025	Himitsu no AiPri: Ring-hen	Wako Sensei	TV Anime	
2025	Notice: What Happens at the Haunted Property	Anne Shinonome		
2025	Parallel Couple: The Truth About My Dead Wife and I	Riko Tsuji		
2025	Captured Broadcasting Station	Seira Okino		
2026	Junji Ito's Strange Tales That Keep You Up at Night	Yuri	Episode 9; short drama	
2026	Masamune-kun Wants to Be Happy	XX-ko		

=== Music video appearances ===
Year	Artist	Song	Notes	Ref.
2023	Atarayo	If I Could Just Say I Love You	ft. KERENMI	

=== Advertisement ===
Year	Company	Title	Notes	Ref(s)
2020	RICAFROSH	"Rag Thomas Kit"	Model	
2021	Kimono Rental Vasara	—N/a	Visual model	
2021	Mel cinna	—N/a		
2021	Evelyn	2021 Summer Collection		
2021	Evelyn	2021 Autumn Collection		
2021	Evelyn	2021 Winter Collection	Visual model	
2022	Evelyn	2022 SS Collection	Visual model	
2022	Evelyn	2022 Summer Collection	Visual model	
2022	Evelyn	2022 Autumn Collection	Visual model	
2022	Evelyn	2022 Winter Collection	Visual model	
2023	Evelyn	2023 Spring Collection	Visual model	
2024	&tint	—N/a	Image model	

== Bibliography ==
=== Magazine ===
- Larme (January 2020, Tokuma Shoten)- regular model
- VOCE May issue (March 22, 2024)

=== Photobooks ===
- B.L.T. SUMMER CANDY 2021 (August 2021, Tokyo News Service )
- Nagisa (Published on July 13, 2023, Takarajimasha) ISBN 9784299044174
