= Himitsu no AiPri =

Japanese media franchise

ひみつのアイプリ (Himitsu no AiPuri)
- Genre: Magical girl; Idol; Science fiction
- Video game
- Developer: syn Sophia
- Publisher: Takara Tomy Arts
- Genre: Rhythm, Dress-up
- Platform: Arcade
- Released: April 4, 2024
- Video game

AiPri Verse
- Developer: syn Sophia
- Publisher: Takara Tomy Arts
- Genre: Rhythm, Dress-up
- Platform: Arcade
- Released: April 4, 2024
- Anime television series
- Directed by: Junichi Fujisaku; Kentarō Yamaguchi
- Written by: Gigaemon Ichikawa
- Music by: Izumi Mori
- Studio: OLM, Inc.; DongWoo A&E
- Original network: TXN (TV Tokyo)
- Original run: April 7, 2024 – March 29, 2026
- Episodes: 102
- Anime film

Himitsu no AiPri: Mankai Buzzlume Live!
- Directed by: Kentarō Yamaguchi
- Written by: Gigaemon Ichikawa
- Music by: Izumi Mori
- Studio: OLM, Inc.; DongWoo A&E
- Released: March 13, 2026
- Runtime: 68 minutes
Further information
Video game
Himitsu no AiPri Collect! Secret Memories
Publisher	Nippon Columbia
Genre	Rhythm, Variety
Platform	Nintendo Switch
Released	December 5, 2024
- Other series
- Pretty Rhythm: Aurora Dream (2011); Pretty Rhythm: Dear My Future (2012); Pretty Rhythm: Rainbow Live (2013); PriPara (2014); Idol Time PriPara (2017); Kiratto Pri☆Chan (2018); Waccha PriMagi! (2021); Himitsu no AiPri (2024); Onegai AiPri (2026)
- icon

Himitsu no AiPri (ひみつのアイプリ, Himitsu no AiPuri) is a Japanese dress-up rhythm arcade game developed by syn Sophia and published by T-ARTS Company. The successor to Waccha PriMagi! and the fifth entry in Takara Tomy's Pretty Series, the series also introduces the AiPri Verse, the fifth generation in the Pretty Series known simply as AiPri.

The anime television series, co-produced by OLM and DongWoo A&E, is the first in the Pretty Series to be animated by a different studio. It aired on TV Tokyo and on its affiliates via the TX Network from April 7, 2024, to March 29, 2026, and it consists of two seasons, the Secret Arc, which aired in 2024, and Ring Arc, which aired in 2025. It is followed by Onegai AiPri on April 5, 2026.

== Plot ==
An "AiPri" is a secret idol who sings and dances in concert performances inside the virtual world known as AiPri Verse.

=== Season 1: Secret Arc ===
Himari Aozora, a first-year student at Private Paradise Academy, admires the popular AiPri idol, Mi-chan, but by chance, she finally finds an AiPri Bracelet in the girls' dormitory and puts it on; she passes through the Secret Door and makes her AiPri idol debut, and has to keep this fact a secret. Meanwhile, it is revealed that Mi-chan's true identity is Mitsuki Hoshikawa, Himari's childhood friend who has been keeping a secret from everyone around her, including Himari. The two of them both have secrets and have both broken their childhood promise to debut in AiPri together. So, their relationship is about to become strained, but they reveal to each other that they've become AiPri idols. Thus, the two of them bring their school life and AiPri idol activities while carrying their secrets.

=== Season 2: Ring Arc ===
In AiPri Verse, new AiPris continue to appear to bring different experiences with an all-new Buzzlume Change. After that, a mysterious princess named Ring Clover and her butler, Shitsumu, announce that an "AiPri Contest" will be held. A contest to decide the world's best AiPri that will make Princess Ring's heart sparkle, they will receive an eternal coord and become the long-awaited "Eternal AiPri." However, it seems that Princess Ring is hiding a secret.

Himari and Mitsuki decide to participate in the AiPri Contest. As they meet more friends, they also encounter further mysteries surrounding the ring, leading into the beginning of the "Ring Arc".

=== Characters ===
==== Poppin' Dreamin' ====
Himari Aozora (青空ひまり, Aozora Himari)
Voiced by: Minori Fujidera
An energetic and cheerful first-year student in Private Paradise Academy, who lives in the school's West Lily girls' dormitory. Despite her energetic personality, she is shy and a crybaby. Because of this, she gets very nervous in front of people but can suppress her stage fright by using a secret spell to press her forehead against her friend, Mitsuki. Her goal is to make 10,000 friends. She is good at dodgeball and is always the last one to get out. Her theme color is milky pink, and her preferred brand is Poppin' Heart.
Mitsuki Hoshikawa (星川みつき, Hoshikawa Mitsuki)
Voiced by: Sae Hiratsuka
A cool, serious first-year student in Private Paradise Academy, who is Himari's childhood friend, roommate at the West Lily girls' dormitory, and best friend. She was a very popular AiPri under the stage name Mi-chan but kept this a secret from those around her, including Himari. When she was a child, she promised to debut in AiPri together with Himari but debuted first because she wanted to teach Himari all about AiPri. She is good at playing the piano and baking. Her theme color is milky blue, and her preferred brand is Miracle Moon.

==== Quartet Star ====
Sakura Ichijōji (一条寺サクラ, Ichijōji Sakura)
Voiced by: Yuriko Hibi
A competitive but well-caring second-year student in Private Paradise Academy, who is the president of the student council, and lives in the school's East Rose girls dormitory, who is also the leader of the dormitory. She speaks in a tomboyish tone. She is very popular in the school. Her theme color is ruby red, and her preferred brand is Scarlet Butterfly.
Tamaki Nikaido (二階堂タマキ, Nikaidō Tamaki)
Voiced by: Anna Suzuki
An elegant and beautiful second-year student in Private Paradise Academy, who is the vice president of the school council, and lives in the school's East Rose girls dormitory. She speaks politely. Her theme color is royal blue, and her preferred brand is Rosession.
Airi Mitsuba (三ツ葉アイリ, Mitsuba Airi)
Voiced by: Sora Tokui
A second-year student in Private Paradise Academy, who is the treasurer of the student council, and lives in the school's West Lily girls dormitory, who is also the leader of the dormitory. She is full of energy and loves to make people laugh. She speaks in a Kansai accent. Her theme color is fresh green, and her preferred brand is RAINBOW CANDY.
Rinrin Shinomiya (四之宮リンリン, Shinomiya Rinrin)
Voiced by: Misaki Watada
A second-year student in Private Paradise Academy, who is secretary of the school council, and lives in the school's West Lily girls dormitory. She is good at data analysis, and also speaks politely. Her theme color is vivid orange, and her preferred brand is Bear Bear Bear.

==== Love JurieL ====
Juria Igarashi (五十嵐じゅりあ, Igarashi Juria)
Voiced by: Rio Tsuchiya
A friendly and cheerful first-year student in Private Paradise Academy, she debuts during the second season as a popular AiPri model known for her charismatic appearance. She lives in the school's West Lily girls dormitory. She loves photo shoots and hates to read. Her theme color is shiny gold, and her preferred brand is CUTIE CARAT.
Elle Rokudo (六堂える, Rokudō Eru)
Voiced by: Rina Kawaguchi
A reserved first-year student in Private Paradise Academy, she debuts during the second season as a secret novelist on AiPrigram. She lives in the school's West Lily girls dormitory and shares her bedroom with Juria, who she doesn't initially get along with. She loves to read, her desk is always full of books and she usually takes notes of what happens near her in order to find the inspiration for her stories. Her theme color is shiny silver, and her preferred brand is CUTIE CARAT.

==== Jumping Rocket ====
Subaru Nanaura (七浦すばる, Nanaura Subaru)
Voiced by: Tatsuyaki Kobayashi
A very popular male AiPri who debuts during the second season. He is produced by his older sister Oto-P and he's told to act like a prince in order to boost the popularity of his public image, but he later transfers from an AiPri School to the Paradise Academy as a first-year student to find his true self. Subaru is actually laidback and he enjoys to play soccer and to collect cute stuffed animals. He is secretly afraid of frogs. His theme color is cool navy, and his preferred brand is Future School.
Otome Nanaura (七浦おとめ, Nanaura Otome)
Voiced by: Kirara Ōmori
Subaru's older sister who debuts during the second season and who is known in AiPri Verse as "Oto-P". Her biggest goal is to produce her little brother but, curiously, she never made her AiPri debut before. When Subaru tries to run away from her by transferring to the Paradise Academy she also enrolls as a second-year student in order to be closer to him. She knows a lot of cute life hacks. Her theme color is otome pink, and her preferred brand is Future School.

==== VIVI & CHII ====
Chii Mamiya (真実夜チィ, Mamiya Chii)
Voiced by: Yō Taichi
An attention-seeking first-year student in Private Paradise Academy, who is Himari and Mitsuki's classemate, and lives in the school's East Rose girls dormitory. She is A self-proclaimed "Super Rookie" as she experienced when it comes to Aipri. She loves rock music and is good at playing the electric guitar. Her theme color is pastel purple, and her preferred brand is Love My Music.
Vivi Hachioji (八王子ビビ, Hachiōji Bibi)
Voiced by: Momoka Terasawa
An animal lover first-year student in Private Paradise Academy who debuts during the second season. She admires Chii and wishes to become an AiPri just like her. Sometimes she ends her sentences with an animal sound when she speaks. Her theme color is hot red, and her preferred brand is Love My Music.

==== Luminous Flora ====
Ring Clover (リング・クロバー, Ringu Kurobā) / Wako Sarashina (更科わこ, Sarashina Wako)
Voiced by: Eri Kitamura (Ring), Nagisa Saitō (Wako)
The mysterious princess of the palace that suddenly appeared in AiPri Verse. Together with her Imuu butler Shitsumuu she judges and organise the AiPri Contest. They seem to be the only ones who know the secret behind the Buzzlume transformations. Later, she befriends Tsumugi and together, they create a unit named Luminous Flora. In episode 88, it turns out that Ring is actually Wako, a clumsy teacher at Paradise Academy who is often seen at the library. She is also teacher Shoma's younger sister and Mitsuki's childhood friend, whom she, as Ring, gave her wings.
As Ring, her theme color is eternal white, and her preferred brand is Princess Ring.
Tsumugi Suzukaze (鈴風つむぎ, Suzukaze Tsumugi)
Voiced by: Yurika Kubo
A mysterious girl from AiPriverse. She is the one who led Himari into AiPriverse, but her true identity and purpose are shrouded in mystery. It is not known what her name is at first, but she reveals it to Himari, who seems to know her in the past. She is also impersonative to Mitsuki. In episodes 34–36, her secret is finally exposed as she reveals her true form as Princess Aipri and also reveals that she is actually Mugi-chan, Himari's PriUsa plush. In Episode 45, it was revealed that Tsumugi is not a real human but an AI avatar, she can only be found in the Aipriverse and not in the real world. In order to compete against Dark Quartet Star, Tsumugi sacrifices herself to earn her victory, which causes her to disappear leaving her AiPri Bracelet dropped in the real world. In episode 48, thanks to Himari and her friends after gaining the Friend Energy of 10,000 friends to charge Tsumugi's bracelet with their performances, Tsumugi has revived and is better than ever, often she is able to talk in the real world via Mugi-Chan. Her theme color is milky yellow, and her preferred brand is Flower March.

=== AiPriverse ===
Meganee Akai (赤井めが姉ぇ, Akai Maganee)
Voiced by: Kanae Itō
The stationarier of AiPriverse. She is in charge of navigation, and appears as a support for Himari and the other Idol Princesses. She also gives advice on outfits and make-up.
Meganii Akai (赤井めが兄ぃ, Akai Maganii)
Voiced by: Junichi Suwabe
He appears during the second season as the AiPri Contest's MC and as a supporter for the Idol Princesses.
MC Imuu (MCアイムゥ, MC Aimuu)
Voiced by: Showtaro Morikubo
A black Imuu with a disco ball-shaped antenna and sunglasses, who is the MC of the program "AiPri Birthday".
Spicy P (スパイシーP, Supaishī P)
Voiced by: Riho Sugiyama
One of the judges of AiPri Birthday. She is calm, collected and a theorist.
Miss Macaron (ミズ・マカロン, Misu・Makaron)
Voiced by: Kanna Nakamura
One of the judges of AiPri Birthday. She is an emotional woman who often bursts into tears.
DJ Hot (DJホット, DJ Hotto)
Voiced by: Kazumasa Nakamura
One of the judges of AiPri Birthday. He has an eccentric personality.

=== Imuu ===
The Imuu (アイムゥ, Aimuu) are the mascots of the series who are AIs that live inside of the AipriVerse to serve as partners to the Aipri Idols in the AiPriverse. Each of them have a different personality and tone of voice, but do not generally have a name.
Himari's Imuu (ひまりのアイムゥ, Himari no Aimuu)
Voiced by: Yurika Kubo
Himari's partner who is pink and has a red heart-shaped antenna. They are cute and friendly, and end their scentences with "Mu".
Mitsuki's Imuu (みつきのアイムゥ, Mitsuki no Aimuu)
Voiced by: Anna Suzuki
Mitsuki's partner who is light blue and has a yellow crescent-shaped antenna. They are energetic, and speaks in a somewhat tomboyish tone.
Tsumugi's Imuu (つむぎのアイムゥ, Tsumugi no Aimuu)
Voiced by: Sora Tokui
Tsumugi's partner who is yellow and has a green clover-shaped antenna.
Sakura's Imuu (サクラのアイムゥ, Sakura no Aimuu)
Voiced by: Yō Taichi
Sakura's partner who is red and has a purple butterfly-shaped antenna. Like Sakura, they speak in a tomboyish tone.
Tamaki's Imuu (タマキのアイムゥ, Tamaki no Aimuu)
Voiced by: Sae Hiratsuka
Tamaki's partner who is blue and has a magenta rose-shaped antenna. They are gentle and somewhat speak in a drawn-out, polite manner.
Airi's Imuu (アイリのアイムゥ, Airi no Aimuu)
Voiced by: Minori Fujidera
Airi's partner who is green and has a purple candy-shaped antenna. Like Airi, they speak in a Kansai dialect.
Rinrin's Imuu (リンリンのアイムゥ, Rinrin no Aimuu)
Voiced by: Yuriko Hibi
Rinrin's partner who is orange and has a yellow bear-shaped antenna.
Chii's Imuu (チィのアイムゥ, Chii no Aimuu)
Voiced by: Misaki Watada
Chii's partner who is purple and has a pink music note-shaped antenna.
Juria's Imuu (じゅりあのアイムゥ, Juria no Aimuu)
Voiced by: Rina Kawaguchi
Juria's partner who is gold and has a diamond-shaped antenna.
Elle's Imuu (えるのアイムゥ, Eru no Aimuu)
Voiced by: Rio Tsuchiya
Elle's partner who is silver and has a diamond-shaped antenna.
Subaru's Imuu (すばるのアイムゥ, Subaru no Aimuu)
Voiced by: Kirara Ōmori
Subaru's partner who is blue and has a planet-shaped antenna.
Otome's Imuu (おとめのアイムゥ, Otome no Aimuu)
Voiced by: Tatsuyaki Kobayashi
Otome's partner who is pink and has a planet-shaped antenna.
Vivi's Imuu (ビビのアイムゥ, Bibi no Aimuu)
Voiced by: Momoka Terasawa
Vivi's partner who is white and has a paw-shaped antenna.
Shitsumuu (シツムゥ, Shitsumuu)
Voiced by: Kazuki Souya
Princess Ring's partner and butler who is pastel purple, has a bell-shaped antenna, a mustache and a bow tie. He organize and judges the AiPri Contest in order to awake Ring.

=== Paradise Academy ===
Victoria Ōsuga (大須賀ヴィクトリア, Ōsuga Vikutoria)
Voiced by: Shizuka Ishigami
The principal of Private Paradise Academy. She has a negative view of students' AiPri activities, as they lead to neglect of their studies, and is in conflict with the student council, considering banning AiPri if a student causes a serious problem. She was Patricia's friend in AiPri.
Shoma Sarashina (更科しょうま, Sarashina Shōma)
Voiced by: Kōji Yusa
Himari and Mitsuki's homeroom teacher.
Neppa Matsuoka (松岡ねっぱ, Matsuoka Neppa)
Voiced by: Ryōta Suzuki
A physical educational teacher.
Patricia Nonose (野乃瀬パトリシア, Nonose Patorishia)
Voiced by: Kiyono Yasuno
The manager of the girls' dormitory. She was Victoria's friend in AiPri.
Yakumo Hoshikawa (星川八雲, Hoshikawa Yakumo)
Voiced by: Atsushi Tamaru
Mitsuki's older brother.
Hinata Aozora (青空ひなた, Aozora Himari)
Voiced by: Hiiro Ishibashi
Himari's older brother. He cares about Himari very seriously.
Kaoru Amo (天羽かおる,, Amō Kaoru)
Voiced by: Akiho Suzumoto
Himari and Mitsuki's classmate.
Mei Ogawa (小川めい, Ogawa Mei)
Voiced by: Emiri Iwai
Himari and Mitsuki's classmate.
Yuko Hanazono (花園結心, Hanazono Yuko)
Voiced by: Minori Suzuki
Himari and Mitsuki's classmate. She is a fan of AiPri, and loves to draw pictures.
Komachi Saotome (早乙女小町, Saotome Komachi)
Voiced by: Yuki Nagaku
Himari and Mitsuki's classmate.
Chime Tamura (田村鈴夢, Tamura Chaimu)
Voiced by: Fūka Izumi
Himari and Mitsuki's classmate.
Yuuma (ゆうま, Yūma)
Voiced by: Hiiro Ishibashi
A boy who is often called "Yuuma-chan", but does not like how he is named.

=== AiPri's family members ===
Tomoki Aozora (青空友希, Aozora Tomoki)
Voiced by: Shin'ya Takahashi
Himari's father.
Hinano Aozora (青空ひなの, Aozora Hinano)
Voiced by: Kana Asumi
Himari's mother.
Hiiro Aozora (青空ひいろ, Aozora Hiiro)
Voiced by: Machico
Himari's younger sister. Like Himari, she is cool.
Fuku (フクちゃん, Fuku-chan)
Voiced by: Machico
Himari's pet pug.
Seiun Hoshikawa (星川星雲, Hoshikawa Seiun)
Voiced by: Naoya Uchida
Mitsuki's grandfather.
Kei Hoshikawa (星川慧, Hoshikawa Kei)
Voiced by: Ai Orikasa
Mitsuki's grandmother.
Comet (コメット, Kometto)
Voiced by: Sae Hiratsuka
Mitsuki's pet cat.
Akane (あかね, Akane)
Voiced by: Ayahi Takagaki
Chii's older sister.

=== Others ===
Kahochi (かほちー, Kahochī)
Voiced by: Kaho Uesugi
The leader of the Himitsu no AiPri Club.
Ato (あと, Ato)
Voiced by: Ato Nishina
A member of the Himitsu no AiPri Club.
Wakana (わかな, Wakana)
Voiced by: Wakana Ōhara
A member of the Himitsu no AiPri Club.

=== Crossover Characters ===
Love (ラブ, Rabu) & Berry (ベリー, Berī)
Voiced by: Hiromi Konno (Love), Hisayo Yanai (Berry)
The duo fashionable witches from the Love and Berry series, who appears in episode 27 as guests.
My Melody (マイメロディ, Maimerodi) & Kuromi (クロミ, Kuromi)
Voiced by: Rei Sakuma (My Melody), Junko Takeuchi (Kuromi)
The two friendly rivals from the Onegai My Melody series. They appear in episode 64 as guests.

== Media ==
=== Arcade game ===
The AiPri games Himitsu no AiPri and AiPri Verse were released on April 4, 2024. Both games were developed by syn Sophia and published by Takara Tomy.

=== Anime ===
The anime adaptation was first announced in December 2023. In January 2024, it was announced that Junichi Fujisaku and Kentarō Yamaguchi would co-direct the series at OLM and DongWoo A&E, with Park Chi-man, Nam Sung-min, Choi Hun-cheol, and Shin Gi-cheol as co-chief directors, Gigaemon Ichikawa handling the series' scripts, Yūki Nagano designing the characters from original character concepts by Yumi Mashimoto, and music composed by Izumi Mori. In February of that year, more cast members were announced. The series premiered on TV Tokyo and on its affiliates via the TX Network on April 7, 2024. The anime also aired on Jaeneung TV in South Korea, TVB Jade in Hong Kong, Anime Generation in Italy, and on EBC Yoyo in Taiwan. The anime series is the first in the Pretty Rhythm franchise to be animated by a different studio alongside DongWoo A&E.

A second season was announced during the "Pretty Series Crossing Live 2024" event. Titled as the Ring Arc (リング編, Ring-hen), it premiered on April 6, 2025.

=== Film ===
An anime film, Himitsu no AiPri: Mankai Buzzlume Live!, was released on March 13, 2026.

=== Video game ===
A video game based on the anime was revealed on September 20, 2024. In the game, players can play minigames based on episodes of the anime, as well as play live games from the arcade games, listen to songs from the series, and watch scenes from the anime. The game was released for Nintendo Switch in Japan on December 5, 2024.
