= Minori Fujidera =

Japanese voice actress

- 藤寺 美徳
- Born: December 18, 2006 (age 19); Chiba Prefecture, Japan
- Occupation: Voice actress
- Years active: 2021–present
- Agent: Avex Pictures

Minori Fujidera (藤寺 美徳, Fujidera Minori; born December 18, 2006) is a Japanese voice actress affiliated with Avex. She started her career after winning an audition held in 2021 as part of the 10th anniversary of the Pretty Rhythm series, making her debut as Auru Omega in Waccha PriMagi!. She also voiced Himari Aozora in Himitsu no AiPri. She also voiced Nana Atami in Onegai AiPri.

== Biography ==
Fujidera was born in Chiba Prefecture on December 18, 2006. She became a member of her school's drama club when she was in junior high, which inspired her to pursue a career in acting. During her third year of junior high school, she participated in an audition held by Avex as part of the 10th anniversary celebration of the Pretty Rhythm series. She won the grand prize, beating around 1,500 other applicants. She made her voice acting debut In 2021 as Auru Omega in Waccha PriMagi!. In 2024 she voiced Himari Aozora, the protagonist of the anime series Himitsu no AiPri, reprising the role for the series' second season in 2025. In 2025 she voiced Hana Haruyama, the protagonist of the anime series Flower and Asura. In 2026 she voiced Nana Atami in Onegai AiPri.

== Filmography ==
=== Anime ===
2021

- Waccha PriMagi!, Auru Omega

2024

- Himitsu no AiPri, Himari Aozora

2025

- Flower and Asura, Hana Haruyama
- Himitsu no AiPri: Ring-hen, Himari Aozora
- A Star Brighter Than the Sun, Sae Iwata

2026

- Onegai AiPri, Nana Atami
- Ghost Concert: Missing Songs, Seria Aiba
- Tank Chair, Shizuka Taira
- Keroro☆, Natsumi Hinata

2027

- The Eternal Fool's Words of Wisdom, Rina
