= List of AKB48 members =

AKB48 is a Japanese idol girl group formed on December 8, 2005. As of 2026, the group consists of 49 members, including 37 official members and 12 trainees.

The member lineup often changes as members graduate from the group and are replaced by members promoted from trainee status. Monica Hesse of The Washington Post describes the AKB48 audition process as "American Idol-esque".

The group has publicized special events for choosing the promotional and recording lineup for some of its singles. In 2009, the concept of sōsenkyo (総選挙; "general elections") was introduced. To obtain a ballot, voters have to buy the group's latest "election single", or sign up for the official paid fanclub. The members who receive the most votes will get to participate in the recording of AKB48's next single, and are heavily promoted. The highest voted member earns the right to be the center performer during the group's live performances.

Narumi Kuranoo is the current leader or "general manager" of AKB48 and all of its sister groups. The results from AKB48's annual general elections from 2009–2018 are included.

Members are listed by order below as they appear on the official website's roster as of October 1, 2026.

== Official members ==
Key
	Denotes elections that the member did not take part in
N/A	Denotes elections the member took part in but did not rank
	Denotes ranking between #81 and #100

Official members of AKB48
Image	Name	Birth date (age)	Election rank									
Image	Name	Birth date (age)	1	2	3	4	5	6	7	8	9	10
	Saho Iwatate (岩立 沙穂, Iwatate Saho)	October 4, 1994 (age 32)				N/A	N/A	66	N/A	51	42	22
	Seina Fukuoka (福岡 聖菜, Fukuoka Seina)	August 1, 2000 (age 26)						N/A	N/A	97	32	31
	Yui Oguri (小栗 有以, Oguri Yui)	December 26, 2001 (age 24)						N/A	N/A	N/A	51	25
	Yurina Gyōten (行天 優莉奈, Gyōten Yurina)	March 14, 1999 (age 27)						N/A	N/A	N/A	N/A	N/A
	Narumi Kuranoo (倉野尾 成美, Kuranoo Narumi)	November 8, 2000 (age 26)						N/A	N/A	34	30	49
	Hiyuka Sakagawa (坂川 陽香, Sakagawa Hiyuka)	October 7, 2006 (age 20)										
	Miu Shitao (下尾 みう, Shitao Miu)	April 3, 2001 (age 25)						N/A	N/A	N/A	N/A	N/A
	Ayane Takahashi (高橋 彩音, Takahashi Ayane)	December 30, 1997 (age 28)						N/A	N/A	N/A	N/A	N/A
	Remi Tokunaga (徳永 羚海, Tokunaga Remi)	October 1, 2006 (age 20)										
	Serika Nagano (永野 芹佳, Nagano Serika)	March 27, 2001 (age 25)						N/A	N/A	N/A	67	104
	Haruna Hashimoto (橋本 陽菜, Hashimoto Haruna)	May 25, 2000 (age 26)						N/A	N/A	N/A	N/A	109
	Erii Chiba (千葉 恵里, Chiba Erii)	October 27, 2003 (age 23)								N/A	N/A	N/A
	Haruka Kurosu (黒須 遥香, Kurosu Haruka)	February 28, 2001 (age 25)									N/A	N/A
	Ayami Nagatomo (長友 彩海, Nagatomo Ayami)	November 2, 2000 (age 26)									N/A	N/A
	Orin Muto (武藤 小麟, Mutō Orin)	July 22, 2000 (age 26)									55	N/A
	Mizuki Yamauchi (山内 瑞葵, Yamauchi Mizuki)	September 20, 2001 (age 25)									N/A	92
	Suzuha Yamane (山根 涼羽, Yamane Suzuha)	August 11, 2000 (age 26)									N/A	N/A
	Yuki Ōta (太田 有紀, Ōta Yuki)	March 27, 2004 (age 22)										
	Airi Satō (佐藤 綺星, Satō Airi)	June 24, 2004 (age 22)										
	Eriko Hashimoto (橋本 恵理子, Hashimoto Eriko)	April 16, 2006 (age 20)										
	Nozomi Hatakeyama (畠山 希美, Hatakeyama Nozomi)	January 25, 2008 (age 18)										
	Yuki Hirata (平田 侑希, Hirata Yuki)	September 3, 2002 (age 24)										
	Moka Hotei (布袋 百椛, Hotei Moka)	December 1, 2004 (age 21)										
	Mayū Masai (正鋳 真優, Masai Mayū)	March 1, 2005 (age 21)										
	Miyū Mizushima (水島 美結, Mizushima Miyū)	November 12, 2003 (age 23)										
	Sora Yamazaki (山﨑 空, Yamazaki Sora)	May 13, 2004 (age 22)										
	Yuna Akiyama (秋山 由奈, Akiyama Yuna)	December 12, 2005 (age 20)										
	Sae Arai (新井 彩永, Arai Sae)	October 5, 2005 (age 21)										
	Kasumi Kudō (工藤 華純, Kudō Kasumi)	June 15, 2005 (age 21)										
	Hinano Kubo (久保 姫菜乃, Kubo Hinano)	February 2, 2006 (age 20)										
	Yumemi Sako (迫 由芽実, Sako Yumemi)	February 5, 2006 (age 20)										
	Kohina Narita (成田 香姫奈, Narita Kohina)	March 3, 2004 (age 22)										
	Azuki Yagi (八木 愛月, Yagi Azuki)	March 22, 2005 (age 21)										
	Yui Yamaguchi (山口 結愛, Yamaguchi Yui)	March 8, 2009 (age 17)										
	Momoka Itō (伊藤 百花, Itō Momoka)	December 6, 2003 (age 22)										
	Kairi Okumoto (奧本 カイリ, Okumoto Kairi)	January 2, 2007 (age 19)										
	Yui Kawamura (川村 結衣, Kawamura Yui)	June 18, 2006 (age 20)										

== Trainees ==
Trainees (研究生, kenkyūsei) are members who have entered the group but have not been assigned or promoted to a fixed team. Currently the trainees are 20th generation-members who were introduced on December 20, 2024, 21st generation-members who were introduced on December 4, 2025, and 22nd generation-members who were introduced on September 26, 2026.

Trainees of AKB48
Name	Birth date (age)
Saki Oga (大賀 彩姫, Oga Saki)	May 16, 2006 (age 20)
Saki Kondo (近藤 沙樹, Kondo Saki)	February 23, 2012 (age 14)
Hinata Maruyama (丸山 ひなた, Maruyama Hinata)	July 11, 2008 (age 18)
Mao Takahashi (髙橋 舞桜, Takahashi Mao)	June 25, 2010 (age 16)
Sayuri Tanaka (田中 沙友利, Tanaka Sayuri)	December 9, 2008 (age 17)
Ema Makito (牧戸 愛茉, Makito Ema)	May 25, 2007 (age 19)
Yu Morikawa (森川 優, Morikawa Yu)	June 24, 2008 (age 18)
Kiko Watanabe (渡邉 葵心, Watanabe Kiko)	July 12, 2007 (age 19)
Yuna Onishi (大西 ゆな, Onishi Yuna)	June 15, 2008 (age 18)
Momoka Hasegawa (長谷川 百々花, Hasegawa Momoka)	December 14, 2006 (age 19)
Izumi Maeda (前田 衣澄, Maeda Izumi)	November 17, 2008 (age 18)
Rinoa Yamauchi (山内利乃明, Yamauchi Rinoa)	December 13, 2012 (age 13)

== See also ==
- List of former members of AKB48
