= Stardust Telepath =

Japanese manga and anime series

- First tankōbon volume cover

星屑テレパス (Hoshikuzu Terepasu)
- Genre: Science fiction; Yuri
- Manga
- Written by: Rasuko Ōkuma
- Published by: Houbunsha
- Imprint: Manga Time KR Comics
- Magazine: Manga Time Kirara
- Original run: May 9, 2019 – present
- Volumes: 6
- Anime television series
- Directed by: Kaori
- Written by: Kaori; Natsuko Takahashi
- Music by: Asuka Sakai
- Studio: Studio Gokumi
- Licensed by: Crunchyroll: SEA: Muse Communication
- Original network: AT-X, Tokyo MX, BS NTV, SUN, SBS
- Original run: October 9, 2023 – December 25, 2023
- Episodes: 12
- Television drama
- Directed by: Emi Yasumura; Tomoya Sugioka
- Produced by: Shinno Nakamura; Yuichi Shibahara
- Written by: Tomoya Sugioka
- Studio: TV Tokyo; Dub
- Original network: TV Tokyo
- Original run: June 26, 2024 – August 28, 2024
- Episodes: 10
- icon

Stardust Telepath (Japanese: 星屑テレパス, Hepburn: Hoshikuzu Terepasu) is a Japanese four-panel manga series written and illustrated by Rasuko Ōkuma. It has been serialized in Houbunsha's seinen manga magazine Manga Time Kirara since May 2019, with its chapters collected in six tankōbon volumes as of June 2026. An anime television series adaptation produced by Studio Gokumi aired from October to December 2023. A television drama adaptation aired from June to August 2024.

== Plot ==
Umika Konohoshi, a shy high school girl, struggles with communication and believes she may never truly connect with others on Earth. Fascinated with space since childhood, she dreams of meeting aliens and one day traveling beyond the planet where she feels she does not belong.

On her first day of high school, Umika meets Yuu Akeuchi, a transfer student who claims to be an alien with no memories of her past. Yuu possesses a unique ability that allows her to understand others by touching foreheads, which helps her connect with Umika despite her social anxiety. Encouraged by this encounter, Umika begins forming her first genuine friendship. Sharing a desire to reach space, the two decide to build a rocket together. They are soon joined by classmates who support their goal, forming a small group dedicated to their project.

== Characters ==
Umika Konohoshi (小ノ星 海果, Konohoshi Umika)
Voiced by: Yurie Funato
Portrayed by: Airi Satō
A young girl who has a fascination with outer space and aliens. However, due to being ridiculed for her belief in aliens, Umika became shy and introverted and finds it difficult to communicate her true feelings to others. Due to the sense of social isolation she suffers, Umika believes she can only communicate with aliens and dreams of traveling to space in a rocket to visit them. She went to the same junior high school as Matataki.
Yū Akeuchi (明内 ユウ, Akeuchi Yū)
Voiced by: Seria Fukagawa
Portrayed by: Momoka Itō
A young, energetic girl who happens to be Umika's classmate. She claims that she is an alien from outer space who is stranded on Earth, but everybody believes she's only joking. Umika is the only person who believes her, and the two quickly become friends. Yu suffers from amnesia and does not remember her life before coming to Earth, but still desires to return to her home planet. She also claims she possesses the power of "foreheadpathy", where she can read the emotions of a person if she touches her forehead against theirs.
Haruno Takaragi (宝木 遥乃, Takaragi Haruno)
Voiced by: Moe Nagamuta
Portrayed by: Maho Omori
The vice president of Umika and Yu's class, Haruno is polite and helpful to everybody, especially towards Umika. She is a self described "lighthouse connoisseur" and also believes Yu is an alien. Her dream is to travel to space to spread Earth's culture to aliens and she quickly becomes friends with Umika and Yu.
Matataki Raimon (雷門 瞬, Raimon Matataki)
Voiced by: Shiki Aoki
Portrayed by: Sora Yamazaki
A young tomboyish girl with a penchant for mechanics and a passion for robots. Her hobbies were met with mockery from her peers in middle school, leaving Matataki embittered about people and developing an aggressive and solitary disposition. Umika attempted to befriend her out of genuine interest, but was coldly rebuffed. However, after challenging her to a bottle rocket duel, Umika mustered the courage to express her admiration for Matataki; this leads to her joining Umika's group of friends. She's a fan of the mecha anime "Ganbarion", and wears goggles on her head to emulate the main protagonist.
Akane Emihara (笑原 茜, Emihara Akane)
Voiced by: Natsumi Takamori
Portrayed by: Ayano Kudo
Honami Konohoshi (小ノ星 穂波, Konohoshi Honami)
Voiced by: Hina Yōmiya
Portrayed by: Ririka Kayamoto

== Media ==
=== Manga ===
Written and illustrated by Rasuko Ōkuma, Stardust Telepath initially started in Houbunsha's Manga Time Kirara magazine on May 9, 2019, as a two-chapter guest work. It began a full serialization in the same magazine on July 9, 2019. The first tankōbon was released on July 27, 2020. As of June 2026, six volumes have been released. The series is set to end with the release of its seventh volume.

==== Volumes ====
No.	Japanese release date	Japanese ISBN
1	July 27, 2020	978-4-8322-7205-7
2	September 27, 2021	978-4-8322-7308-5
3	October 27, 2022	978-4-8322-7409-9
4	September 27, 2023	978-4-8322-7486-0
5	February 27, 2025	978-4-8322-9615-2
6	June 26, 2026	978-4-8322-9728-9

=== Anime ===
An anime television series adaptation was announced on October 7, 2022. It is produced by Studio Gokumi and directed by Kaori, who also supervised the scripts with Natsuko Takahashi. Takahiro Sakai designed the characters and served as chief animation director, and Asuka Sakai composed the music. The series aired from October 9 to December 25, 2023, on AT-X and other networks. The opening theme song is "Ten to Sen" (点と線) by Miku Itō, and the ending theme song is "Tentaizu" (天体図) by SoundOrion. Crunchyroll is streaming the series outside of Asia. Muse Communication licensed the series in Southeast Asia.

==== Episodes ====
No.	Title	Directed by (Note: Information is taken from the ending credits of each episode.)	Written by	Storyboarded by	Original release date
1	"Cometary Encounter"; Transliteration: "Suisei Enkaunto" (Japanese: 彗星エンカウント)	Kaori	Natsuko Takahashi	Kaori	October 9, 2023
Umika Konohoshi is a young girl about to start high school. However, she suffers social anxiety due to her difficulties in communicating with others. Feeling that she can relate more to aliens, she wishes on a shooting star to meet one. When she attends school the next day, Umika encounters a girl named Yu Akeuchi who claims she is an alien from outer space. Yu approaches Umika and shows and interest in her, since nobody else in the school believes she is an alien. She also mention she has the special power of "foreheadpathy", allowing her to read the emotions of a person if they touch foreheads together. The next day, Umika tells Yu about her dream to travel to space to look for aliens, and Yu responds that since she's trying to return to her home planet, they can help each other. After school, Yu takes Umika to an abandoned lighthouse she is living at, explaining that she woke up there with no memories of her life before being stranded on Earth. Umika uses foreheadpathy to communicate her desire to help Yu get home, thus cementing their friendship. Meanwhile, one of Umika and Yu's classmates watches the lighthouse from a distance.
2	"Sunset Rocket"; Transliteration: "Yūyake Roketto" (Japanese: 夕焼ロケット)	Tōru Hamasaki	Natsuko Takahashi	Kaori & Tōru Hamasaki	October 16, 2023
Umika researches how to build a rocket to get Yu home, but becomes discouraged when she realizes how difficult it would be. The next day at school, the vice president of the class, Haruno Takaragi, asks Umika and Yu if they were at the lighthouse last night. Umika lies, fearing that Haruno will inform the authorities of their trespassing. However, Haruna explains that she likes lighthouses in general, and that she also believes Yu is an alien. Yu tells Haruno about their dream to build a rocket to go to space, and Haruno agrees to help them. The next day, Umika brings several bottles and has Yu and Haruno help her build a bottle rocket as the first step to building a real rocket. They then launch the rocket at the lighthouse, and seeing the rocket they built together take off into the air, Umika notices that her feelings of anxiety have disappeared.
3	"Explosive Mechanic"; Transliteration: "Bakuyaku Mekanikku" (Japanese: 爆薬メカニック)	Shin'ichirō Ueda	Rinrin	Shin'ichirō Ueda	October 23, 2023
Umika, Yu, and Haruno continue developing more sophisticated bottle rockets that achieve greater distances. However, Umika is aware they are nearing the limit of what bottle rockets can achieve, so they need somebody with mechanical experience to help them develop a more complex rocket. They decide to recruit Matataki Raimon, a student with mechanical skills. However, she has not attended class since the first day of school, so the trio head to her house to meet her. They ask her to help build a rocket, but Umika is too shy to explain her reasons so Matataki refuses to aid them. That night, Umika recalls how she first met Matataki in middle school and how she wanted to build a giant robot, but she could not work up the courage to befriend her. The next morning, Yu encourages Umika to let her feelings be known to Matataki, as the two of them are very similar. Umika visits Matataki again, this time telling her about her desire to go to space to find a place where she can belong. She then issues a challenge to Matataki to see who can build a better bottle rocket, with Matataki having to help build their rocket if she loses. Umika then heads back to the lighthouse and meets Yu and Haruno who praise her for her bravery. Haruno then gifts a key to Umika and Yu.
4	"Clashing Seaside"; Transliteration: "Kessen Shīsaido" (Japanese: 決戦シーサイド)	Tatsuya Sasaki	Rinrin	Satoshi Shimizu	October 30, 2023
Haruno reveals the key leads to a hidden basement underneath the lighthouse that she and her grandfather had turned into a secret hideout, and offers it to Yu, though Yu insist that the hideout be used by all of them. The next day, Umika and her friends go shopping for the materials for their newest rocket, which also turns out to be the very first time Umika has gone out with friends. When the day of their duel arrives, Umika and Matataki agree that they have two chances to launch their rockets, using the best results. The rocket that flies the highest or farthest will determine the winner. Umika's bottle rocket outperforms Matataki's first rocket, so she instead uses a second rocket that is powered by a rocket motor, taking advantage of a loophole in the rules. Expecting Umika to beg her to help build her rocket, Matataki is caught off guard when Umika finally gains to courage to say what she always wanted to when she first saw her; that she thinks her goggles are cool and wishes that Matataki would attend school more so they can hang out. The next day, Umika and her friends are surprised to see Matataki attending class again, through she claims she's only doing it to avoid failing for nonattendance.
5	"Endless Dreamer"; Transliteration: "Mugen Dorīmā" (Japanese: 無限ドリーマー)	Shigeki Awai	Kana Yamada	Kaori	November 6, 2023
In the next step to create a more sophisticated rocket, Matataki suggests that the group form an official club so that they can use the school's budget to help fund their rocket construction. The girls submit a club application, with Matataki surreptitiously designating Umika as the club president and Haruno as the vice president. Their homeroom teacher agrees to greenlight the application, but suggests that they come up with a more concrete concept of what their club does in order to improve the chances their application will be approved. Later, the class goes on a two day study trip where they have to make group reports. Umika and Yu end up being in a different group from Haruno and Matataki, stressing Umika since she's still shy around other classmates. Fortunately, Yu's encouragement helps Umika open up to their group. Later that night, Umika sees Yu stargazing, and promises again that she will help Yu get home. Haruno and Matataki then arrive with fireworks and the girls set them off together.
6	"Salutatory Initiation"; Transliteration: "Kanpai Inishiēshon" (Japanese: 乾杯イニシエーション)	Akira Koremoto	Natsuko Takahashi	Taizō Yoshida	November 13, 2023
The girls' application to form the Rocket Research Club is rejected by the school, and they are classified as a hobby group instead meaning they do not have access to club benefits. Regardless, Yu points out they just need to achieve some accomplishments to gain enough recognition to become a club. They begin focusing on trying to build model rockets powered by black powder motors, with Matataki providing some instruction to the other girls. Umika then suggest they attend a model rocket festival to gain additional experience. While there, they encounter Kei Akizuki, a student from another school who is also a rocket enthusiast and the president of her own rocket club. The group quickly befriends Kei, who was also invited to the festival to launch a large rocket as the main event. After the festival ends, Matataki issues a challenge to Kei since both of their teams will be joining a local model rocket competition, which Kei accepts.
7	"Daring Leadership"; Transliteration: "Daitan Rīdāshippu" (Japanese: 大胆リーダーシップ)	Tōru Hamasaki	Natsuko Takahashi	Yū Nobuta	November 20, 2023
After meeting Kei, Umika comes to admire her and wishes to be a respected club president like her. At her school's club president meeting, Umika works up the courage to declare that the Rocket Research hobby group will win the model rocket contest. However, Haruno discovers that the rules of the contest requires all team members to possess a Class 4 model rocket license. Mataki reveals she has a Class 3 license and is also able to issue Class 4 licenses. After the girls pass Matataki's tests and earn their license, they invite her to go out with them, which she reluctantly accepts. With two months left until the competition, Matataki decides to take on all the responsibility designing and building their rocket, despite Umika wanting the whole group to work together on it. On the way home, Umika admits to Yu how helpless she feels, with Yu reassuring her that just as she helps Umika talk to other people, Umika helps her be able to explore Earth. This inspires Umika not to let Matataki handle the rocket design and construction by herself.
8	"Into Battle, Ultra High-Power Dream"; Transliteration: "Shutsujin Urutora Hai Pawā Dorīmu" (Japanese: 出陣ウルトラハイパワードリィーム)	Shōta Hamada	Natsuko Takahashi	Kōji Iwai	November 27, 2023
Matataki begins pushing herself to refine the design of their rocket, especially when it comes to making sure the parachute deploys properly, so Haruno cautions her not to take on the burden of building the rocket all on herself. Matataki insists that she is fine, and is resolved to make sure she builds the best rocket because she is aware the other girls have no experience. As the qualifiers for the competition draw near, the girls step up their rocket building efforts. However, construction of the rocket has a rough start, especially with Umika's inexperience, causing Matataki to lose her temper. Umika briefly flees, but resolves not to run away from her responsibility. Matataki is regretful at yelling at Umika, and upon reading her notes, recalls how Umika is just as determined win as she is. Matataki finally relents and agrees to assign roles to that the other girls are suited for. After the end of terms exams and at the start of summer vacation, the girls finish their rocket, "Ultra High-Power Dream", and take it to the qualifiers. However, Umika remains nervous since she needs to make a speech to introduce her rocket.
9	"Planetary Gravity"; Transliteration: "Wakusei Gurabiti" (Japanese: 惑星グラビティ)	Yasuhiro Geshi & Kaori	Natsuko Takahashi	Masayuki Kojima	December 4, 2023
Umika and her team are intimidated when they see Kei's team make an almost perfect speech and rocket launch. During her own speech, Umika freezes up due to stage fright and her team has difficulties launching their rocket, causing them to fail to make it past the qualifier. Afterwards, Matataki gets frustrated with her loss and storms out, yelling at Haruno not to contact her again. Umika feels that she's at fault for her team losing and withdraws, refusing to contact Yu or her friends for the next week. One week later, Umika happens across Kei who praises her team's rocket, which she notes had impressive performance. Umika confides that she feels like her team's loss is her fault and there's nowhere she belongs. Kei then points out that Umika does not need to look to space for a place to belong when she already has friends on Earth in the form of her hobby group, and she looks forward to facing them again next year. Inspired by Kei's words, Umika returns to the lighthouse to apologize to Yu, but finds it seemingly abandoned. Umika is upset at Yu's absence, which seemingly summons her to her side. Umika apologizes to Yu and tells her how she finally realizes she has a place in the hobby group. This causes Yu to regain the memory of a song she used to sing as a child. Hearing Yu sing the song, Umika finally finds her own resolve and inner strength.
10	"Crybaby Restart"; Transliteration: "Nakimushi Risutāto" (Japanese: 泣虫リスタート)	Tōru Hamasaki	Natsuko Takahashi	Hiroyuki Ōshima	December 11, 2023
Umika returns to school after summer vacation and learns that Haruno had shown the rest of the class a recording of their rocket launch, which has impressed everybody. When they learn that Matataki has once again stopped coming to school, Umika and her friends head to Matataki's house to try and contact her, but she refuses to talk to them. Heading back, Yu realizes something wrong with Haruno and uses her foreheadpathy to discover that Haruno has her own doubts and worries. Haruno admits that she is afraid of having her own dream after experiencing the pain of seeing one of her childhood friends give up theirs, which is why she does not appear to take winning or losing seriously. Umika reassures Haruno that they're still friends and she looks forward to building a new rocket with her. Haruno recalls a conversation with her grandfather over having dreams, and returns to Matataki's house, challenging her to return to the hobby group otherwise she will build a better rocket than her. After Haruno leaves, Matataki quietly grumbles that she is not as skilled as everybody thinks she is.
11	"Rematching Seaside"; Transliteration: "Saisen Shīsaido" (Japanese: 再戦シーサイド)	Masahiko Suzuki	Natsuko Takahashi	Shōta Hamada	December 18, 2023
Wanting to find a way to help Matataki, Umika arranges a meeting with Kei and her Rocket R&D Club. They meet Kei's clubmates, Neon Teruya and Michiru Yugumo. Kei and her club spend the day helping teach Umika, Yu, and Haruno how to better build and test their rockets. Then, Umika carries out the next stage of her plan which is to challenge Matataki to another rocket duel, which she accepts. Umika and Matataki both launch their own rockets, with the one flying higher being the winner. Umika's rocket wins by a large margin, but Haruno discovers that Matataki deliberately threw the match by using a weaker rocket engine so that she would have an excuse not to rejoin the hobby group. Umika then tells Matataki that she realizes that they are the same, with Matataki also looking for a place to belong and hiding her pain. Matataki admits that she wants to continue building rockets with the hobby group, too, and everybody makes amends. However, on the way home, Umika collapses from a fever.
12	"Stardust Telepath"; Transliteration: "Hoshikuzu Terepasu" (Japanese: 星屑テレパス)	Kaori	Natsuko Takahashi	Kaori	December 25, 2023
Umika is forced to stay home to recover from her fever, and her friends come to pay her a visit. However, while having a fever dream, Umika mutters in her sleep that she wants Yu to only use foreheadpathy with her. Yu overhears this and becomes flustered. After recovering from her fever, Umika meets back up with her friends, who plan on how to make themselves be recognized as on official club and reiterate their dreams and goals. Umika wants to use the hobby group as a means of learning how to be a leader and be able to better interact with others, Yu still wants to reach space to go home, Matataki wants a rematch against Kei, while Haruno hopes she'll be able to find her own dream by staying with the hobby group. Umika then returns to school, where she makes more of an effort to talk to her classmates. Later that evening, Umika meets with Yu at the lighthouse, where Yu is still nervous around Umika due to her previous words. Worried, Umika initiates foreheadpathy, and Yu realizes that Umika is concerned about her. Umika thanks Yu for being her friend and states her dream has changed. Instead of going to space to find friends, she now wants to travel to space with her friends. As Umika and Yu reiterate their promise to go to space together, the lighthouse miraculously turns on for a short time as everybody continues on their path towards the future.

=== Drama ===
A television drama adaptation produced by TV Tokyo and Dub was announced on March 17, 2024. It starred the idol group AKB48 and was directed by Emi Yasumura and Tomoya Sugioka, based on a screenplay by Sugioka. Shinno Nakamura and Yuichi Shibahara served as the producers. The series aired on TV Tokyo from June 26 to August 28, 2024. (Note: TV Tokyo listed the series premiere at 24:30 JST on June 25, 2024, which is effectively June 26 at 12:30 am.) The theme song is "Pin to Kita" (ピンと来た), and the ending theme song is "Yumemite Gomen" (夢見てごめん), both performed by AKB48.

== Reception ==
In 2021, the series was nominated in the seventh Next Manga Awards in the Best Printed Manga category.

The anime adaptation received mixed reviews. Yuricon founder Erica Friedman, reviewing the first two episodes, resonated with the desire of Umika to "find a solution to her loneliness outside human society," called the anime's focus on the fun from amateur rocketry as "terrific," said the series is "off to a good start," and praised the opening sequence as "quite lovely." However, she criticized the "extremely high-pitched voices" and found the focus of the series around "people with severe social anxiety" made her anxious, which lessened as the series went on, and she criticized the series for having animation "not to my taste," for occasional fan service and hoped the story will be about "making friends with neurodivergent classmates and building hope along with rockets."

In Anime News Network's anime preview guide for Fall 2023, Richard Eisenbeis described the series as about "a young person trying to find her place in the world" and developing skills that can be used repeatedly "to make friends," while Rebecca Silverman said the series reminded her of Wish Upon the Pleiades, praised the imagery as adorable and related to Umika's social anxiety, but enjoyed less as it continued, with a strong dislike of the teacher, Nicholas Dupree argued that compelling parts of the protagonists "have been sanded down to comedic gimmicks by the end credits," and James Beckett praised the series for lively animation but for only being a "slight variation in the usual coming-of-age comedy formula."

Reviewing the first episode, Vrai Kaiser of Anime Feminist was more positive, calling it "about that fantasy of heart-to-heart connection," praised the empathy, gentleness of the show's tone, how the feelings of Umika in being alone in the world is a "deeply resonant one as a queer viewer," and said that if the series mages the "same emotional tenderness...and mental health struggles" as Bocchi the Rock!, it will "turn out to be quite the keeper." In a later Anime Feminist digest, the series was described as a "sweet sci-fi yuri about an anxious girl bonding with a psychic alien."
