= Breaking Up Was the Plan, the Duke Falling For the Villainess Was Not! =

Japanese light novel series

- Cover of the first light novel volume

破局予定の悪女のはずが、冷徹公爵様が別れてくれません！ (Hakyoku Yotei no Akujo no Hazu ga, Reitetsu Kōshaku-sama ga Wakarete Kuremasen!)
- Genre: Fantasy, isekai, romantic comedy
- Novel series
- Written by: Kotoko
- Published by: Shōsetsuka ni Narō (self-published)
- Original run: 3 April 2022 – present
- Light novel
- Written by: Kotoko
- Illustrated by: Ataka
- Published by: Enterbrain
- English publisher: NA: Cross Infinite World
- Imprint: B's Log Bunko
- Original run: 15 November 2022 – present
- Volumes: 4
- Manga
- Written by: Kotoko
- Illustrated by: Minori Amanatsu; Ayumi Nakashima
- Published by: Kadokawa Shoten
- Imprint: Flos Comic
- Magazine: KadoComi
- Original run: 31 December 2022 – present
- Volumes: 6

Breaking Up Was the Plan, the Duke Falling For the Villainess Was Not! (Japanese: 破局予定の悪女のはずが、冷徹公爵様が別れてくれません！, Hepburn: Hakyoku Yotei no Akujo no Hazu ga, Reitetsu Kōshaku-sama ga Wakarete Kuremasen!; lit. "I Was Supposed to be the Villainess Destined for a Breakup, but the Cold-Hearted Duke Won't Let Me Go!") is a Japanese light novel series written by Kotoko and illustrated by Ataka. Originally published as a web novel on Shōsetsuka ni Narō since April 2022, it later began publication by Enterbrain under its B's Log Bunko imprint in November 2022. A manga adaptation illustrated by Minori Amanatsu and Ayumi Nakashima began serialization online on Kadokawa's KadoComi website under the Flos Comic brand in December 2022.

== Plot ==
A Japanese office worker is reincarnated as her favorite romance novel's villainess Grace Saintsbury, who plans to prevent a war by breaking her relationship with main character Duke Zane Winslet in order to get him together with the novel's heroine Charlotte. Much to Grace's chagrin, Zane remains obsessed with her afterwards, with her former ally Count Gardner taking an interest.

== Media ==
=== Light novel ===
Written by Kotoko, Breaking Up Was the Plan, the Duke Falling For the Villainess Was Not! originally started as a web novel on Shōsetsuka ni Narō, with its first two chapters published on 3 April 2022. A light novel version, illustrated by Ataka, had its first volume published by Enterbrain under its B's Log Bunko imprint on 15 November 2022. In October 2025, Cross Infinite World announced that it has licensed the light novel for English publication.

| No. | Original release date | Original ISBN | English release date | English ISBN |
|---|---|---|---|---|
| 1 | 15 November 2022 | 978-4-04-737165-1 | 31 December 2025 (digital); 28 April 2026 (physical) | 979-8-88560-205-1 |
| 2 | 15 May 2023 | 978-4-04-737491-1 | 31 March 2026 (digital); 18 July 2026 (physical) | 979-8-88560-207-5 |
| 3 | 15 March 2024 | 978-4-04-737857-5 | 30 June 2026 | 979-8-88560-209-9 |
| 4 | 13 December 2024 | 978-4-04-738197-1 | — | — |

=== Manga ===
A manga adaptation illustrated by Minori Amanatsu and Ayumi Nakajima began serialization online on Kadokawa's KadoComi website under the Flos Comic brand on 31 December 2022. The first compiled volume was released on 2 May 2023.

| No. | Original release date | Original ISBN | English release date | English ISBN |
|---|---|---|---|---|
| 1 | 2 May 2023 | 978-4-04-681754-9 | — | — |
| 2 | 5 December 2023 | 978-4-04-683010-4 | — | — |
| 3 | 5 August 2024 | 978-4-04-683665-6 | — | — |
| 4 | 4 April 2025 | 978-4-04-684727-0 | — | — |
| 5 | 5 January 2026 | 978-4-04-684727-0 | — | — |
| 6 | 4 September 2026 | 978-4-04-660092-9 | — | — |

== Reception ==
Rebecca Silverman and Lauren Orsini of Anime News Network gave the first volume a 4 and 3.5 (respectively) out of 5. Silverman praised the unique approach to the villainess genre, drawing comparisons of the "face-to-face with your book boyfriend" romance concept with self-insertion fanfiction, while Orsini called it "a compelling, complicated take on the villainess story that reckons with what it really means to be a good person". Sean Gaffney of A Case Suitable for Treatment felt that the first volume was lacking in darker moments despite their presence, remarking: "It’s still MOSTLY a comedy, but the pull from darkness is what makes it interesting ... I hope [the next volume] keeps the dark stuff as well.".

Orsini praised the first volume's handling of the personality change associated with isekai reincarnation, while Gaffney showed awe over Grace's nature as a villainess. Regarding the first volume's structure, Silverman called the translation "smooth and very readable ... with a light but not fluffy vocabulary", and Gaffney called the addition of a prologue to the first volume "rather pointless".

== See also ==
- The Final-Boss Prince Is Somehow Obsessed with the Chubby Villainess: Reincarnated Me, a manga series with the same writer
- Grinding My Way to a Happy Ending: If Only My OP Big Bro Didn't Make Things So (Sister) Complex!, another light novel series with the same writer
- In Another World, My Sister Stole My Name, a manga series with the same writer
