= In Another World, My Sister Stole My Name =

Japanese manga series

- First tankōbon volume cover

異世界で姉に名前を奪われました (Isekai de Ane ni Namae o Ubawaremashita)
- Genre: Isekai
- Manga
- Written by: Kotoko
- Illustrated by: NiKrome
- Published by: Kadokawa Shoten
- English publisher: NA: Yen Press
- Imprint: Flos Comic
- Magazine: KadoComi; Nico Nico Seiga
- Original run: September 1, 2022 – present
- Volumes: 5
- Light novel
- Written by: Kotoko
- Illustrated by: NiKrome
- Published by: Fujimi Shobo
- Imprint: Kadokawa Books
- Original run: July 10, 2024 – present
- Volumes: 2

In Another World, My Sister Stole My Name (異世界で姉に名前を奪われました, Isekai de Ane ni Namae o Ubawaremashita) is a Japanese manga series written by Kotoko and illustrated by NiKrome. It began serialization on Kadokawa Corporation's KadoComi and Nico Nico Seiga websites in September 2022. A light novel version began publication under Fujimi Shobo's Kadokawa Books imprint in July 2024.

== Synopsis ==
Ichika befriends a boy named Cecil through a magic hand mirror that is connected to another world. One day, the hand mirror disappears along with Ichika's older sister Karen. One year later, the mirror reappears and transports Ichika to that world, where she later finds Cecil, and her long-lost sister Karen. After Karen reveals to Ichika that she stole her identity after getting transported, Ichika ultimately decides to continue in this world and find her destiny as "Karen".

== Characters ==
Ichika (一花)
Voiced by: Suzuko Mimori (voice comic)
Karen (華恋)
Voiced by: Asami Seto (voice comic)
Noa (ノア)
Voiced by: Takuya Eguchi (voice comic)
Cecil (セシル, Seshiru)
Voiced by: Kensho Ono (voice comic)
Nicola (二コラ, Nikora)
Voiced by: Yurika Takagi (voice comic)

== Media ==
=== Manga ===
Written by Kotoko and illustrated by NiKrome, In Another World, My Sister Stole My Name began serialization on Kadokawa Corporation's KadoComi and Nico Nico Seiga websites on September 1, 2022. Its chapters have been compiled into five tankōbon volumes as of June 2026. The series is licensed for English publication by Yen Press.

No.	Original release date	Original ISBN	North American release date	North American ISBN
1	November 17, 2022	978-4-04-681969-7	August 20, 2024	978-1-9753-9092-1
1. "The Other Side of the Mirror"; 2. "My Life in Another World"; 3. "Fiancé"; 4. "Cecil and Noah"; 5. "Blooming"
2	July 14, 2023	978-4-04-682588-9	March 25, 2025	978-1-9753-9699-2
6. "The Second Saint"; 7. "Identical Scenery"; 8. "A Saint's Duties"; 9. "A Saint's Powers"; 10. "Where They Each Stand"
3	December 14, 2023	978-4-04-683190-3	July 22, 2025	979-8-8554-0542-2
11. "A Curious Child"; 12. "During the Journey"; 13. "Bygone Tales"; 14. "Circumstances"; 15. "Ichika"
4	July 5, 2024	978-4-04-683563-5	February 24, 2026	979-8-8554-1566-7
16. "A Tiny Lie"; 17. "Strangeness"; 18. "An Important Conversation"; 19. "Seal"; 20. "Connecting the Dots"
5	June 17, 2026	978-4-04-660171-1	—	—

=== Light novel ===
A light novel version of the story, also written by Kotoko and illustrated by NiKrome, began publication under Fujimi Shobo's Kadokawa Books imprint on July 10, 2024. Two volumes have been released as of June 10, 2026.

No.	Japanese release date	Japanese ISBN
1	July 10, 2024	978-4-04-075421-5
2	June 10, 2026	978-4-04-076437-5

=== Other ===
In commemoration of the release of the second volume, a voice comic adaptation was uploaded to Kadokawa Corporation YouTube channel that same day. It featured performances from Suzuko Mimori, Asami Seto, Takuya Eguchi and Kensho Ono.

== Reception ==
The series was ranked third in the Nationwide Publishers Recommended Comics list of 2024.

== See also ==
- Breaking Up Was the Plan, the Duke Falling For the Villainess Was Not!, a light novel series written by Kotoko
- The Final-Boss Prince Is Somehow Obsessed with the Chubby Villainess: Reincarnated Me, another manga series written by Kotoko
- Grinding My Way to a Happy Ending: If Only My OP Big Bro Didn't Make Things So (Sister) Complex!, a light novel series written by Kotoko
