= Yurie Funato =

Japanese voice actress (born 1994)

- 船戸 ゆり絵
- Born: September 18, 1994 (age 32); Saitama Prefecture, Japan
- Occupation: Voice actress
- Years active: 2015–present
- Agents: Holy Peak (2015–2018); Amuse Inc. (2019–present)
- Known for: Stardust Telepath as Umika Konohoshi

Yurie Funato (船戸 ゆり絵, Funato Yurie; born September 18, 1994) is a Japanese voice actress and former idol who is affiliated with Amuse Inc. She was formerly a member of the idol group Purely Monster.

== Biography ==
Funato was born in Saitama Prefecture on September 18, 1994. Her mother is a professional narrator. She studied jazz dancing and calligraphy while in elementary school.

During her middle school years, she started thinking about becoming a voice actress, helped by her family's love of anime and video games, along with her mother's work as a narrator. She was exposed to her mother's scripts and videos of her voice acting. She also became a member of her school's brass club. Upon reaching high school, she became a member of the cheerleading club as there was no dance club at her school. The cheerleading club was successful, even winning the gold medal in a Kantō region competition. She also worked part-time at Kura Sushi during this period.

While in high school, she was further inspired to pursue voice acting since her classmate was also attending voice acting training. She started attending training sessions and workshops. In real life, she was sometimes made fun of because of her high-pitched voice, but during the workshops her voice was described as being beautiful and her strength. After graduating from high school, she attended Watanabe Entertainment College. Following her studies, she became a member of the idol group Purely Monster after an audition and became affiliated with the talent agency Holy Peak.

In 2018, Funato left Purely Monster to recover from a leg injury. She also left Holy Peak and became a freelancer. The following year, she became affiliated with Amuse Inc.

In 2023, she played her first main role as Umika Konohoshi, the protagonist of the anime television series Stardust Telepath. She was also cast as the character Hikari Hinata in the 2024 anime television series Highspeed Etoile.

== Filmography ==
=== Anime ===
2021

- The Hidden Dungeon Only I Can Enter, Leila
- Mazica Party, Kuracchi

2023

- Stardust Telepath, Umika Konohoshi

2024

- Highspeed Etoile, Hikari Hinata

2026

- Chainsmoker Cat, Hame Neko
- Uncle's Obsession with Cute Things, Anne
- The Seven Knights of the Marronnier Kingdom, Kastehelmi

=== Dubbing ===
- Wolf Man, Ginger Lovell (Matilda Firth)
