= Fūka Izumi =

Japanese voice actress

- 和泉 風花
- Born: January 11; Aichi Prefecture, Japan
- Education: Japan Narration Actor Institute
- Occupation: Voice actor
- Years active: 2019–present
- Agent: Amuse Inc.

Fūka Izumi (和泉 風花, Izumi Fūka; born January 11) is a Japanese voice actress. She has been active in the entertainment industry since 2018, and played roles in Z/X and the game Kemono Friends 3. In 2024, she played Utena Hiiragi in Gushing over Magical Girls, and Meme Bashame in My Deer Friend Nokotan. She was also cast as Rin Rindō, the protagonist of Highspeed Etoile, and in 2026, she voiced Miki Azumi in The Ramparts of Ice.

== Biography ==
Fūka Izumi developed an interest in anime at a young age, watching them since her elementary school days. She became interested in becoming a voice actor after watching the Gintama anime television series, having been a fan of Weekly Shōnen Jump and anime adaptations of its manga series. She also cites Miyu Irino's voice acting performance in the anime series Haikyu!! as an inspiration for her interest. She initially had doubts about being able to pursue a voice acting career, thinking it would have been impossible for her to become one, but when she entered junior high school she felt it was what she wanted to pursue. While in high school, she served as the manager of the swimming club despite not being an official member of the club, which led to her describing her participation as being a "ghost club member."

After a period of training at the Japan Narration Actor Institute, Izumi started her career in 2018 and joined the talent agency VIMS. She played roles in anime series such as Z/X: Code Reunion, as well as games such as Magia Record and Kemono Friends 3. She also became a member of the voice acting units SHiFT for Z/X and Hanamaru Animal for Kemono Friends. Izumi left VIMS in 2022 and joined Amuse Inc. later that year. In 2024, she played the role of Utena Hiiragi in Gushing over Magical Girls and Rin Rindō in Highspeed Etoile.

== Filmography ==
=== Anime ===
2019

- Granblue Fantasy: The Animation as girl

2021

- Suppose a Kid from the Last Dungeon Boonies Moved to a Starter Town as Berry

2022

- Shikimori's Not Just a Cutie as schoolgirls

2023

- The Legend of Heroes: Trails of Cold Steel – Northern War as girls getting ice cream
- The Dangers in My Heart as Daijuni Junior High students
- Ao no Orchestra as Umimaku freshmen, Suzuki

2024

- Gushing over Magical Girls as Utena Hiiragi
- Highspeed Etoile as Rin Rindō
- Dahlia in Bloom as Lucia Fano
- My Deer Friend Nokotan as Meme Bashame
- Himitsu no AiPri as Tamura Chaimu

2025

- Flower and Asura as An Natsue
- Dealing with Mikadono Sisters Is a Breeze as Sakura Yaotome

2026

- Chained Soldier 2 as Yakumo Ezo
- Dark Moon: The Blood Altar as Sooha
- Kill Blue as Noren Mitsuoka
- Kirio Fan Club as Seira Tashiro
- The Ramparts of Ice as Miki Azumi
- Magical Sisters LuluttoLilly as Tōko Kandachi
- Mistress Kanan Is Devilishly Easy as Milch Zebul
- The Classroom of a Black Cat and a Witch as Aria Aquarius
- Oh Boy, Was I Wrong About Her as Saki Murao
- The Cat and the Dragon as Shirotae
- Nia Liston: The Merciless Maiden as Rinokis Funk
- Uncle's Obsession with Cute Things as Bosskichi
- Tetsuryō! Meet with Tetsudō Musume as Yayoi Nakano

2027

- The Final-Boss Prince Is Somehow Obsessed with the Chubby Villainess: Reincarnated Me as Adele
- LONA as Mugen
- The Otome Heroine's Fight for Survival as Alicia
- 7-nin no Nemuri Hime as Yuka

=== Films ===
2024

- A Few Moments of Cheers as Emi Nakagawa

2025

- Virgin Punk: Clockwork Girl as Noa Andriette

=== Video games ===
2019

- Kemono Friends 3 as Dhole
- Magia Record: Puella Magi Madoka Magica Gaiden as Hikaru Kirari

2020

- Re:Stage! Prism Step as Asahi Hinata

2021

- Disgaea 6: Defiance of Destiny as Piyori Nijino

2025

- Goddess of Victory: Nikke as Crust
- Arknights as Mon3tr
- Umamusume: Pretty Derby as Buena Vista

2026

- In Falsus as Nia Cana
- Zenless Zone Zero as Norma Hollowell
