= Reincarnated as the Daughter of the Legendary Hero and the Queen of Spirits =

Japanese light novel series

- First light novel volume cover

父は英雄、母は精霊、娘の私は転生者。 (Chichi wa Eiyū, Haha wa Seirei, Musume no Watashi wa Tenseisha)
- Genre: Isekai, comedy
- Novel series
- Written by: Matsuura
- Published by: Shōsetsuka ni Narō
- Original run: September 10, 2016 – November 1, 2020
- Light novel
- Written by: Matsuura
- Illustrated by: keepout
- Published by: Fujimi Shobo
- Imprint: Kadokawa Books
- Original run: March 10, 2018 – October 7, 2022
- Volumes: 9
- Manga
- Written by: Matsuura
- Illustrated by: Yutaka Ohhori
- Published by: Square Enix
- English publisher: NA: Comikey Square Enix
- Imprint: Big Gangan Comics
- Magazine: Monthly Big Gangan
- Original run: September 25, 2018 – present
- Volumes: 15
- Anime television series

Dad Is a Hero, Mom Is a Spirit, I'm a Reincarnator
- Directed by: Toshinori Fukushima
- Written by: Touko Machida
- Music by: Misaki Umase
- Studio: J.C.Staff
- Licensed by: Crunchyroll: SEA: Medialink
- Original network: Tokyo MX, BS NTV, HTB, AT-X
- Original run: October 5, 2025 – December 21, 2025
- Episodes: 12
- icon

Reincarnated as the Daughter of the Legendary Hero and the Queen of Spirits (父は英雄、母は精霊、娘の私は転生者。, Chichi wa Eiyū, Haha wa Seirei, Musume no Watashi wa Tenseisha) is a Japanese light novel series written by Matsuura and illustrated by keepout. It was serialized online between September 2016 and November 2020 on the user-generated novel publishing website Shōsetsuka ni Narō. It was later acquired by Fujimi Shobo, who have published nine volumes from March 2018 to October 2022 to under their Kadokawa Books imprint. A manga adaptation with art by Yutaka Ohhori has been serialized in Square Enix's seinen manga magazine Monthly Big Gangan since September 2018 and has been collected in fourteen tankōbon volumes. The manga is published digitally in North America by Comikey and Square Enix. An anime television series adaptation produced by J.C.Staff aired fron October to December 2025.

== Plot ==
Ten years ago, a hero saved the kingdom from a horde of demons; however, he was badly injured. His spirit partner whisked him off to her world to tend to him. Years later, he returns with a daughter and both are pulled into a centuries-long dark history surrounding the royal family.

== Characters ==
Ellen Vankrieft
Voiced by: Seria Fukagawa
The protagonist of the story; she was born part human and part spirit. Ellen is able to materialize anything she wishes due to perfectly remembering the periodic table; creating precious metals and causing explosions at will. She cannot be around anyone of the royal family as their bloodline is unwillingly carrying the misery of Spirits their ancestors murdered in a harebrained attempt to force Spirits to make contracts. Ellen's greatest wish to is to become a voluptuous woman, but she only has a few years before she stops aging permanently.
Ellen later ascended to godhood, with the power to manipulate all matter; Origin explained it as a form of purification as Ellen can "reset" what she deems incorrect.
Rovel Vankrieft
Voiced by: Kazuyuki Okitsu, Misato Matsuoka (young)
A hero who save his kingdom from demons; he is Ellen's father and half spirit. He is so handsome that most women will immediately consider infidelity. Rovel is very displeased the prince is blackmailing him and Ellen into helping resolve the curse; otherwise the truth about Aria's receiving a divine punishment would be revealed.
Rovel is annoying to Ellen, due to his obsessive doting and overprotectiveness; she has to act like the adult most of the time and scold him.
Origin
Voiced by: Mai Nakahara
Ellen's mother and Rovel's wife, nicknamed "Ori" by the latter; she is the Goddess of creation and Queen of Spirits. Ori is best remembered for her see through dress, which she has no shame in wearing. Her sisters govern truth and marriage.
Origin's powers can create life, be it passively affecting the environment by being in the human world, or deliberately by creating spirits.
Sauvel Vankrieft
Voiced by: Hirofumi Nojima
The current Duke; he looks older due to his mustache. Sauvel is a good man, but is weak willed and has little time for family. He often calls in Rovel and Ellen for help.
Aria Vankrieft
Voiced by: Ai Kakuma
Formerly a barmaid and Sauvel's lover for many years in his unhappy marriage. Despite being happy with Sauvel, she immediately gets impure thought for Rovel; resulting in her new marriage breaking down and neglecting her daughter. It's made worse that she has the mark of thorns on her wrist, which will never go away unless her infidelity thoughts cease.
Lafilia Vankrieft
Voiced by: Aya Yamane
Ellen's paternal cousin. She has a pretty rough life indirectly caused by Ellen and Rovel; despite becoming a noble, her commoner lineage makes other nobles taunt her. It's made worse when she's kidnapped by accident; they were looking for Ellen, whom was making medicine nobles wanted to monopolize. She does end up befriending the princes, whom see her hardship.
Agielle
Voiced by: Satomi Arai
A princess of the royal family, who forced an engagement to Rovel before his disappearance; she forced Sauvel to marry her instead, lying that her daughter was the result of a drunken one-night stand. Agielle overindulged over the years; looking like a plump frog. When she attempted to lie that the daughter was Rovel's, Ellen blew up the fake proof and made Agielle to be unable to touch her father.
Raviselle
Voiced by: Masaaki Mizunaka
The Crown Prince and Agielle's older brother. He's a cunning and shrewd man, always trying to force Rovel's hand into breaking the curse that plagues the Royal Family and let them form contracts with spirits again.
Gadielle
Voiced by: Shōya Chiba
Oldest son of the first prince. He longs to make a contract with Spirits, but he cannot despite having a pure heart; the curse on his bloodline will attempt to latch on to any spirit near him, like Ellen.
Despite the curse, he and Ellen become smitten with each other over time; thanks to the mutual respect for each other. Ironically, mirroring the romance of Rovel and Origin.

== Media ==
=== Light novel ===
Written by Matsuura, Reincarnated as the Daughter of the Legendary Hero and the Queen of Spirits was initially serialized on the user-generated novel publishing website Shōsetsuka ni Narō from September 10, 2016, to November 1, 2020. It was later acquired by Fujimi Shobo who published nine volumes with illustrations by keepout under their Kadokawa Books light novel imprint from March 10, 2018, to October 7, 2022.

| No. | Release date | ISBN |
|---|---|---|
| 1 | March 10, 2018 | 978-4-04-734979-7 |
| 2 | June 9, 2018 | 978-4-04-735178-3 |
| 3 | May 10, 2019 | 978-4-04-735376-3 |
| 4 | October 10, 2019 | 978-4-04-735377-0 |
| 5 | May 9, 2020 | 978-4-04-073563-4 |
| 6 | October 10, 2020 | 978-4-04-073828-4 |
| 7 | April 9, 2021 | 978-4-04-074032-4 |
| 8 | November 10, 2021 | 978-4-04-074296-0 |
| 9 | October 7, 2022 | 978-4-04-074297-7 |

=== Manga ===
A manga adaptation illustrated by Yutaka Ohhori began serialization in Square Enix's seinen manga magazine Monthly Big Gangan on September 25, 2018. The manga's chapters have been collected into fifteen tankōbon volumes as of October 2026. The manga is published digitally in North America by Comikey and by Square Enix via their Manga UP! Global app.

| No. | Release date | ISBN |
|---|---|---|
| 1 | May 10, 2019 | 978-4-7575-6113-7 |
| 2 | October 10, 2019 | 978-4-7575-6334-6 |
| 3 | March 12, 2020 | 978-4-7575-6546-3 |
| 4 | September 25, 2020 | 978-4-7575-6857-0 |
| 5 | March 25, 2021 | 978-4-7575-7172-3 |
| 6 | September 25, 2021 | 978-4-7575-7491-5 |
| 7 | April 25, 2022 | 978-4-7575-7895-1 |
| 8 | November 25, 2022 | 978-4-7575-8273-6 |
| 9 | June 23, 2023 | 978-4-7575-8625-3 |
| 10 | January 25, 2024 | 978-4-7575-9020-5 |
| 11 | August 23, 2024 | 978-4-7575-9378-7 |
| 12 | March 25, 2025 | 978-4-7575-9770-9 |
| 13 | September 25, 2025 | 978-4-301-00076-1 |
| 14 | March 25, 2026 | 978-4-301-00418-9 |
| 15 | October 23, 2026 | 978-4-301-00835-4 |

=== Anime ===
An anime television series adaptation was announced on January 21, 2024. It is produced by J.C.Staff and directed by Toshinori Fukushima, with Touko Machida handling series composition and episode screenplays, Mina Ōsawa designing the characters, and Misaki Umase composing the music. The series aired from October 5 to December 21, 2025, on Tokyo MX and other networks. The opening theme song is "Mahō" (魔法; 'Magic'), performed by Kaho, while the ending theme song is "Family", performed by Yui Nishio. Crunchyroll streamed the series under the title Dad Is a Hero, Mom Is a Spirit, I'm a Reincarnator. Medialink licensed the series in Southeast Asia for streaming on Ani-One Asia's YouTube channel.

==== Episodes ====
| No. | Title | Directed by (Note: Production staff information is taken from the ending credits of each episode.) | Storyboarded by | Original release date |
|---|---|---|---|---|
| 1 | "The Hero Returns"; Transliteration: "Eiyū no Kikan" (Japanese: 英雄の帰還) | Yoshiyuki Nogami | Toshinori Fukushima | October 5, 2025 |
In the past Tenbahl Kingdom was attacked by monsters, so the King sent spirit wizard Rovel Vankreift to defeat them. Victorious but dying Rovel was taken to the spirit world by Spirit Queen Origin. Rovel has returned after ten years but stays anonymous as he does not want to be the hero. He also brought with him Ellen, his and Origin's half-spirit daughter. Ellen reveals in her past life she was a Japanese scientist. Rovel is found by his former bodyguard Alberto, who informs him after his victory the Venkreift's were made nobility. Unfortunately, his younger brother Sauval married Princess Agiel, Rovel's unpleasant former fiancée. Her extravagance has bankrupted the Vankreifts, so Alberto asks Rovel to somehow get rid of her. Knowing she is a devious woman, Rovel quickly visits a church and summons Origin to legally register their marriage. With her power to synthesize elements from the periodic table Ellen creates platinum wedding rings. The wedding is also blessed by Origin's sisters, twin Goddesses Vor the All-seeing and Var the Condemner. Rovel sends Origin and Ellen to the spirit world so Agiel doesn't learn they exist. Watching through a spirit mirror they watch Rovel confront Agiel, a selfish, obese woman obsessed with Rovel, convinced he has returned to marry her.
| 2 | "Vankreift Family Predicament"; Transliteration: "Vankreift-ka no Mondai" (Japanese: ヴァンクライフト家の問題) | Nana Fujiwara | Takaaki Ishiyama | October 12, 2025 |
Agiel introduces her similarly obese daughter Amiel, whom she insists is Rovel's daughter. Sauvel's butler Roren confirms Amiel probably isn't Sauvel's daughter either. Rovel demands a meeting with the Justice Department to begin Sauvel's divorce. Rovel informs Sauvel about Origin and Ellen. Sauvel admits he has a mistress and a daughter he wishes to be with. The King is informed of the situation so his underhanded son Ravisel reminds him it is vital he not upset Rovel further. Ellen notices miasma around Ravisel and Origin explains it is a curse placed on the royals generations ago for angering the spirits. In court Agiel demands a divorce so she can marry Rovel, whom she insists is Amiel's father. Rovel denies this as he has been gone ten years and cannot have fathered the eight year old Amiel. Having claimed Sauvel is not Amiel's father either the court accepts Agiel's accidental confession of infidelity and grants the divorce along with forbidding Agiel to marry again. Goddess Var curses Agiel to prevent her touching men for the rest of her life. Rovel visits Ravisel in secret, who is pleased that with Agiel ruined and the King certain to abdicate he will soon become King thanks to Rovel. He suggests Ellen marrying his son, which Rovel rejects. He returns home certain Ravisel is now an enemy.
| 3 | "King Ravisel"; Transliteration: "Kokuō Ravisueru" (Japanese: 国王ラヴィスエル) | Toshiteru Masamoto | Kōichi Takada | October 19, 2025 |
Suspecting it was Alberto that leaked information to Ravisel, Rovel suspends Alberto's employment. Rovel meets his mother Isabella and explains the royal family's curse prevents them forming contracts with spirits, so Ravisel must want to marry Ellen to his son to end the curse. Rovel introduces Origin and Ellen to Isabella. Ellen demonstrates her powers by creating a huge diamond and a pile of gold bars. Isabella worries about being able to freely create such wealth, so Ellen promises not to do it again. She gives the diamond to Isabella while Sauvel takes the gold to restore public funds stolen by Agielle. Alberto insists he won't work for Ravisel anymore, but Ravisel forces him to perform one last task. Alberto infiltrates the house at night to give Ellen a letter from Ravisel. Refusing to even read it she informs ALberto the royals have forgotten it was their arrogance that offended the spirits, and until they earn forgiveness they do not deserve to form contracts with them. She advises Alberto to never see Ravisel again and convinces Rovel to consider forgiving Alberto, who only had good intentions for the Vankreift's. Ravisel is amused Ellen was smart enough to burn his letter and becomes even more determined to have her for the royals.
| 4 | "Goddess Vár's Condemnation"; Transliteration: "Megami Vāru no Danzai" (Japanese: 女神ヴァールの断罪) | Baoning Wen | Shinpei Nagai | October 26, 2025 |
Rovel reassigns Alberto as Sauvel's bodyguard, but reminds him it is his fault Ravisel is targeting Ellen. Rovel and Sauvel decide to claim the gold Ellen conjured was discovered in a Vankreift mine to hide where it came from. Sauvel hopes to bring his lover Aria, a barmaid at a café, and their daughter Rafilia who is Ellen's age, to live in the mansion. As Ellen is destined to replace Origin as Spirit Queen, Rovel agrees Sauvel needs to marry Aria so Rafilia can be heir to the Vankreift's. Aria is attracted to Rovel as soon as she meets him. Rovel asks Origin to accompany him to the wedding as proof he is married, but asks Ellen to stay in the spirit world away from Ravisel. Aria cannot hide her disappointment that Rovel is married. Ellen notes Ravisel's wife Lalar and children Gadielle, Rasel, and Ciel possess the same royal curse. Goddess Var sends a sign disapproving of Sauvel and Aria's marriage which only they and Ravisel notice. Ellen panics as Ravisel could use it to destroy their family's reputation. To stop Ravisel saying anything, Ellen teleports to the wedding and creates a fake Goddess blessing by showering the guests in diamonds. Before she can teleport away, she is seen by Gadielle.
| 5 | "Feud between the Royal Family and the Spirits"; Transliteration: "Ōke to Seirei no Kakushitsu" (Japanese: 王家と精霊の確執) | Keisuke Nishijima | Kōichi Takada | November 2, 2025 |
Knowing Var disapproved of Sauvel marrying Aria, Ravisel demands Rovel bring Ellen to meet his sons. Rovel confronts Aria who now has a scar on her wrist from Var for lying during her wedding vows. Origin explains the scar is faint, so Aria does love Sauvel, but she lusts for Rovel. Origin warns Aria to remain faithful to Sauvel to earn Var's forgiveness. Aria confesses her sin to Sauvel, hurting him deeply. Origin's servant Vint reveals to Ellen 200 years ago the human King demanded the Spirit Queen destroy monsters attacking his kingdom. When the Queen refused, the King tried to force her, and she ended up cursing the royals. Ellen decides it is unjust for Ravisel to try breaking the curse while unaware of the crime his ancestor committed. Ellen visits Aria and explains her actions have caused an even deeper rift between Rovel and the royals. Since Rovel is necessary for the kingdom's defense, Ravisel might fear Aria's actions will cause Rovel to leave again. This means Ravisel might assassinate Aria to please Rovel. Aria faints from terror and Sauvel thanks Ellen for giving Aria the warning she needed. As they are going to meet the royals, Isabella demands new formal clothes for everybody. Ellen also shaves Sauvel's beard, making him look more like Rovel and hopefully, more attractive to Aria.
| 6 | "The Significance of the Spirit Festival"; Transliteration: "Seirei-sai no Igi" (Japanese: 精霊祭の意義) | Kozō Kaihō | Takaaki Ishiyama | November 9, 2025 |
Rovel and Ellen teleport to the royal castle where Ravisel attempts to embarrass Rovel with gossip of Aria's attraction to him, yet is impressed when Ellen deduces it was Queen Lalar spreading the gossip. Ravisel brings in Gadiel and Rasel, with Gadiel recognising Ellen as the wedding spirit. With three cursed royals so close to her Ellen sees the truth; their miasma is deformed spirits, trapped and suffering. Ellen has a vision of the past King and sees he tortured spirits in an attempt to force the Spirit Queen to serve him. Rovel teleports Ellen away while Ravisel finally realises why royals can't talk to spirits. The next day the royals take part in their annual prayer to the spirits during the Spirit festival. It is revealed Gadiel learned the truth years ago from an old book and has been praying to the spirits regularly. Origin explains to Ellen that the spirits cursed the former King to always hear the screams of the spirits he tortured. The curse should have ended when he died but since the tortured spirits had nowhere to go they clung to the royal blood instead. Ellen is desperate to help the trapped spirits but Origin explains it will be difficult as the royals only pray once a year for tradition, not because they are truly sorry. As they have not earned forgiveness Origin is forced to forbid Ellen from helping the trapped spirits or contacting the royals.
| 7 | "The Curse of the Mines"; Transliteration: "Kōzan no Noroi" (Japanese: 鉱山の呪い) | Daisuke Kurose | Daisuke Kurose | November 16, 2025 |
Three years pass and though Gadiel and Rasel visit the Vankreift's regularly Ellen avoids them. On their latest visit they encounter Rafilia whom Gadiel finds amusing due to her temper. Ellen and Rovel visit Sauvel to help with the Vankreift mines. Ellen's childhood friend Van, a White Tiger spirit and son of Origin's butler Vint, regrets he can't go as he still can't take human form. Sauvel decides he must close the mine as the silver appears to have run out. He has also decided to claim Ellen's gold ingots are family heirlooms. They visit the miners who are like family to Isabella. Ellen notices the mine contains a lot of quartz, so she magics some silver into a quartz piece, giving the miners hope the mine can stay open. Rovel is angered by Ellen's interference. Sauvel also claims the mine has been cursed by the spirits. Ellen deduces the curse which makes the miners sick is actually Pneumoconiosis, a lung condition caused by breathing in rock dust. With Origin's permission Ellen draws on her past life as a scientist to design a medicine for the miners. Elements shown at 21:08 of episode 7: Rubidium, Lead, Neon, Astatine, Hydrogen, Magnesium, Carbon. Ellen can be seen sitting around chemical structure drawings during this time. After days of work Ellen transmutes the medicine but develops a fever from the effort.
| 8 | "Melancholy of Rafilia"; Transliteration: "Rafiria no Yūutsu" (Japanese: ラフィリアの憂鬱) | Keisuke Nishijima | Kōichi Takada | November 23, 2025 |
Origin confirms Ellen's strength and physical growth are unbalanced, so she consults her sisters Vor and Var. Ellen recovers so in secret Rovel and Sauvel allow Ellen to place even more silver, gold and jewels inside the mine walls, making it appear they were always there so the miners can remain employed. Ellen also provides the medicine to the miners and arranges for the local church to distribute all the medicines she plans on making. Meanwhile, Rafilia resents being made to behave like a noble. She also misses Gadiel and has come to hate even hearing Ellen's name. Her relationship with her parents is strained as Sauvel is always working and Aria has become alcoholic. Rovel advises Sauvel should pay more attention to Rafilia. The situation becomes so bad Isabella confronts Sauvel and he admits Rafilia being rebellious is frustrating compared to how Ellen behaves. Isabella angrily tells him being unfavourably compared to Ellen is probably what made Rafilia angry in the first place, so Sauvel needs to fix it. Feeling left out of recent events Origin throws a tantrum, so Ellen and Rovel go spend time with her in the Spirit World. Sauvel guiltily realises Rafilia probably feels the same as Origin does.
| 9 | "The Healing Princess"; Transliteration: "Chiryō no Ohime-sama" (Japanese: 治療のお姫様) | Kozō Kaihō | Toshinori Fukushima, Kōichi Takada | November 30, 2025 |
Rafilia continues to write to Gadiel about her frustrations. A pandemic sweeps the kingdom so Ellen provides medicines. Rumours of an apothecary using incredible medicines reaches Hume, Ravisel's court healer. Knowing Hume's own mother is sick, Ravisel manipulates Hume by giving him permission to investigate the apothecary and the Vankreifts. Ravisel also tells Gadiel about the apothecary and implies she works for Ellen. As her treatments make her a target Sauvel hires Alberto's son Kai as Ellen's bodyguard. Believing a human is insufficient Rovel also summons Van to protect her. They instantly form a rivalry over who can better protect Ellen. Hume and Gadiel go undercover as commoners with knights Vogel and Rabe, hoping to locate the apothecary. Hume is astounded as he can sense wind spirits blowing the disease into the sky where it is purified by the freezing air, suggesting a powerful spirit sorcerer is involved. Gadiel suspects Ellen but keeps this from Hume. Rafilia receives a letter from Gadiel that makes her incredibly happy. More people become sick so Rovel is forced to agree Ellen can make more medicine but warns her not to make herself sick again. Rafilia disappears and with his spirit senses Van overhears people lamenting the lack of medicines and rumours of a female apothecary. Ellen suspects someone kidnapped Rafilia by mistake, thinking she was the apothecary.
| 10 | "The Kidnapping Incident"; Transliteration: "Yūkai Jiken" (Japanese: 誘拐事件) | Keisuke Nishijima | Shinpei Nagai | December 7, 2025 |
Rafilia's maid provides the letter, showing Gadiel summoned Rafilia to the castle. Van leads them to Gadiel and Hume but Rafilia is not with them. Gadiel is upset Ellen is afraid of him. Gadiel admits he is trying to find the source of the medicines but denies writing the letter. Ellen is surprised Hume has a spirit pact with Ashute, a rabbit spirit, despite working for the Royals. Ashute's loving reaction to Ellen confirms for Hume that Ellen is the Spirit Princess and source of the medicines. Ellen reveals Ravisel's main goal is making sure she and Rovel stay in the kingdom, so it is unlikely he would risk kidnapping Rafilia. Gadiel is upset by her claim Ravisel manipulated him. Having failed their mission Ellen proposes they help find Rafilia and she will give them a sample of medicine. Gadiel and Hume surmise Rafilia is being held in a disused quarry. Gadiel asks that if they rescue Rafilia he and Ellen have a conversation. Van confirms Rafilia is being held by several men so they teleport to the quarry. Rovel deals with the guards while Sauvel confronts their leader. Origin briefly joins the fighting and Ellen sees for the first time what happens when her parents combine powers. Sauvel defeats the leader and retrieves Rafilia, to Ellen's relief.
| 11 | "Ravisel's Intentions"; Transliteration: "Ravisueru no Omowaku" (Japanese: ラヴィスエルの思惑) | Nana Fujiwara | Kōichi Takada | December 14, 2025 |
Rafilia awakens and immediately blames Ellen. Rovel takes Ellen away and Rafilia realises too late she has angered Van by making Ellen cry. Rovel apologises for dragging Sauvel's family into his troubles, but Sauvel is actually grateful as he now knows why Rafilia is rebellious. Gadiel is forced to realise it was Ravisel who sent the fraudulent letter to Rafilia and was behind her kidnapping. As promised, Ellen gives them a sample of the medicine but refuses to tell them how to make more as it is impossible for humans to do so anyway. Ashute confirms even spirits couldn't replicate it as it is a process completely unique to Ellen's abilities. Ellen explains if Ravisel wants more medicine he will have to pay a fair price. She also insists the Vankreift's will be keeping the kidnappers, since Ravisel will be unable to claim the men are his without also admitting he arranged the kidnapping. As promised, Ellen agrees to speak to Gadiel in private. Gadiel apologises for the crimes of his ancestor, but Ellen refuses to acknowledge it as his ancestor never regretted his actions in his lifetime, and to immortal beings like spirits the amount of time that has passed since the crime occurred is irrelevant. Plus, Ravisel has proved by his actions he feels no regret, and with the pandemic growing worse he has only doomed himself by angering the Vankreifts, the source of the only effective medicine. Gadiel feels true despair.
| 12 | "Between Humans and Spirits"; Transliteration: "Hito to Seirei no Made" (Japanese: 人と精霊の間で) | Shūji Miyazaki | Toshinori Fukushima | December 21, 2025 |
Gadiel is furious with Ravisel. Ellen lets the kidnappers live if they spread rumours Ravisel stole medicine from Vankreift clinics and is hoarding it for the royals. The citizens revolt and threaten to storm the palace. Ravisel has treatment centres opened but cannot provide the medicine as Ellen only sent a small sample. Origin consoles Ellen who is broken-hearted she must allow innocent people to suffer. Most of Ellen's sample is wasted by Ravisel's healers trying to identify the ingredients, so there is none left when both Ravisel and Gadiel become ill. Ellen provides medicine for them and also starts accepting new patients into Vankreift clinics. Ellen visits Gadiel and points out history is repeating itself with humans once again relying on spirits to save them. Gadiel regrets the violent actions of his ancestor even more. Ellen agrees to sell Ravisel the medicine. Ellen summons healing spirits Leben and Krelen to treat patients on Vankreift lands in a way that their recovery appears natural. She also has the neglected farmlands repaired by Borden the earth spirit, rain spirits Niesel and Regen, sun spirit Licht and plant spirits Fran and Opst. The food grown is distributed to the citizens for free at Vankreift clinics and Ellen earns a fortune selling medicine to Ravisel. Months later the pandemic ends and thousands of citizens move onto Vankreift lands to work on the revitalised farms, bringing merchants with them and making Vankreift lands the new de-facto capital city. Ravisel admits defeat and promises to never interfere with the Vankreifts again. Rovel and Origin look forward to seeing what Ellen does next.

== See also ==
- Parallel World Pharmacy, a light novel series also illustrated by keepout
- Reincarnated as a Neglected Noble, a light novel series also illustrated by keepout
