= Grinding My Way to a Happy Ending: If Only My OP Big Bro Didn't Make Things So (Sister) Complex! =

Japanese light novel series

- First light novel volume cover

バッドエンド目前のヒロインに転生した私、今世では恋愛するつもりがチートな兄が離してくれません！？ (Baddo Endo Mokuzen no Heroin ni Tensei Shita Watashi, Konse de wa Ren'ai Suru Tsumori ga Cheat na Ani ga Hanashitekuremasen!?)
- Genre: Fantasy; Isekai; Romance
- Novel series
- Written by: Kotoko
- Published by: Shōsetsuka ni Narō
- Original run: April 1, 2021 – present
- Light novel
- Written by: Kotoko
- Illustrated by: Tsukasa Satsuki (vol. 1–2); Kei Kumanomi (vol. 3–)
- Published by: TO Books
- English publisher: NA: J-Novel Club
- Imprint: TO Bunko (2022–2025); Celica Novels (2026–)
- Original run: January 20, 2022 – present
- Volumes: 10 + 1 side story
- Manga

I Was Reincarnated as the Heroine on the Verge of a Bad Ending, and I'm Determined to Fall in Love!
- Written by: Kotoko
- Illustrated by: Ikuto Nanase
- Published by: TO Books
- English publisher: NA: Tokyopop
- Imprint: Corona Comics (vol. 1–7); Celica Comics (vol. 8–)
- Magazine: Corona EX
- Original run: June 16, 2022 – present
- Volumes: 8
- Anime

Grinding My Way to a Happy Ending: If Only My OP Big Bro Didn't Make Things So (Sister) Complex! (Note: Japanese: バッドエンド目前のヒロインに転生した私、今世では恋愛するつもりがチートな兄が離してくれません！？, Hepburn: Baddo Endo Mokuzen no Heroin ni Tensei Shita Watashi, Konse de wa Ren'ai Suru Tsumori ga Cheat na Ani ga Hanashitekuremasen!?), also known as Cheat Ani (チート兄, Chīto Ani) for short, is a Japanese web novel series written by Kotoko. It originally began serialization on the online publication platform Shōsetsuka ni Narō in April 2021. TO Books later began publishing it as a light novel in January 2022, with ten volumes and a side story volume released as of March 2026. A manga adaptation illustrated by Ikuto Nanase began serialization on TO Books's Corona EX website in June 2022, and has been compiled into eight volumes as of March 2026. An anime adaptation has been announced.

== Plot ==
Reine, an otome game enthusiast, is crushed by her video game shelf. She then finds herself reincarnated as Reine Waynewright, the protagonist of an otome game. Despite being the protagonist, Reine has been the subject of bullying due to her poor magic skills and lack of intelligence, with her also being ranked F in the school's ranking system. Wanting to avoid reaching a bad ending and catching the interest of possible love interests, Reine decides to work hard and improve herself to become more appealing to others.

== Characters ==
Reine Waynewright (レーネ・ウェインライト, Rēne Ueinraito)
Voiced by: Sayumi Suzushiro (drama CD)
A student at Heartfelt Academy who is currently classified as the lowest F-rank, leading to her being the subject of bullying. She initially woke up after two days of unconsciousness after falling down some stairs. She was an office worker named Reine (鈴音) before being sent to this world; she remembers playing the original game but dropped it due to not enjoying the gameplay and story.
Julius Waynewright (ユリウス・ウェインライト, Yuriusu Ueinraito)
Voiced by: Yuma Uchida (drama CD)
Reine's older brother, who is deeply attached to and protective of her. In contrast to Reine, who is at the bottom of the school hierarchy, he is ranked S-rank, the highest.
Maximilian Steiner (マクシミリアン・スタイナー, Makushimirian Sutainā) / Yoshida (吉田)
Voiced by: Kaito Ishikawa (drama CD)
The crown prince of a neighboring kingdom, who takes interest in Reine.
Theodore Lindgren (セオドア・リンドグレーン, Seodoa Rindogurēn)
Voiced by: Yūichirō Umehara (drama CD)
Willi MacLeod (ヴィリー・マクラウド, Vuirī Makuraudo)
Voiced by: Tasuku Hatanaka (drama CD)
Arnold Eckert (アーノルド・エッカート, Ānorudo Ekkāto)
Voiced by: Kōhei Amasaki (drama CD)
Reinhardt Noakes (ラインハルト・ノークス, Rainharuto Nōkusu)
Voiced by: Yusuke Shirai (drama CD)

== Media ==
=== Light novel ===
Kotoko originally began posting the series on the online publication platform Shōsetsuka ni Narō on April 1, 2021. It was then picked up for publication by TO Books, which began publishing it as a light novel. The first volume was released on January 20, 2022; ten volumes and a side story volume have been released as of March 1, 2026. The first two volumes feature illustrations by Tsukasa Satsuki, while volume three onwards feature illustrations by Kei Kumanomi.

During their panel at Anime NYC 2026, J-Novel Club announced that they had licensed the series for English publication.

No.	Release date	ISBN
1	January 20, 2022	978-4-86699-408-6
2	August 20, 2022	978-4-86699-642-4
3	December 20, 2022	978-4-86699-727-8
4	April 20, 2023	978-4-86699-830-5
5	September 20, 2023	978-4-86699-951-7
6	March 15, 2024	978-4-86794-122-5
7	September 14, 2024	978-4-86794-313-7
8	March 15, 2025	978-4-86794-506-3
SS	June 14, 2025	978-4-86794-584-1
9	September 15, 2025	978-4-86794-703-6
10	March 1, 2026	978-4-86794-888-0

=== Manga ===
A manga adaptation illustration illustrated by Ikuto Nanase began serialization on TO Books's Corona EX website on June 16, 2022. The first tankōbon volume was released under the Corona Comics imprint on December 1, 2022; eight volumes have been released as of March 1, 2026. The manga is licensed in English by Tokyopop under the title I Was Reincarnated as the Heroine on the Verge of a Bad Ending, and I'm Determined to Fall in Love!.

No.	Original release date	Original ISBN	North American release date	North American ISBN
1	December 1, 2022	978-4-86699-716-2	November 12, 2024	978-1-42787-915-8
2	April 15, 2023	978-4-86699-831-2	January 28, 2025	978-1-42788-048-2
3	September 15, 2023	978-4-86699-944-9	March 11, 2025	978-1-42788-071-0
4	March 15, 2024	978-4-86794-116-4	May 20, 2025	978-1-42788-107-6
5	September 14, 2024	978-4-86794-307-6	September 16, 2025	978-1-42788-278-3
6	March 15, 2025	978-4-86794-496-7	October 28, 2025	978-1-42788-293-6
7	September 15, 2025	978-4-86794-691-6	—	—
8	March 1, 2026	978-4-86794-880-4	—	—
9	August 1, 2026	978-4-86854-074-8	—	—

=== Drama CD ===
A drama CD was released with the sixth volume of the light novel on March 15, 2024. A second drama CD was released with the eighth volume of the light novel released on March 15, 2025.

=== Stage play ===
A stage play adaptation ran at the CBGK Shibugeki theater from December 11 to 15, 2024.

=== Anime ===
An anime adaptation was announced on February 25, 2026.

== Reception ==
It was reported at the time of the anime announcement that the series had over 1.4 million copies in circulation as of February 2026.

== See also ==
- Breaking Up Was the Plan, the Duke Falling For the Villainess Was Not!, another light novel series with the same writer
- The Final-Boss Prince Is Somehow Obsessed with the Chubby Villainess: Reincarnated Me, a manga series with the same writer
- In Another World, My Sister Stole My Name, a manga series with the same writer
