= The Final-Boss Prince Is Somehow Obsessed with the Chubby Villainess: Reincarnated Me =

Japanese manga series

- First tankōbon volume cover, featuring Celine Eldred (left) and Wilfred Percival (right)

おデブ悪女に転生したら、なぜかラスボス王子様に執着されています (Odebu Akujo ni Tensei Shitara, Naze ka Rasu Bosu Ōji-sama ni Shūchaku Sareteimasu)
- Genre: Fantasy, isekai, romance
- Manga
- Written by: Kotoko
- Illustrated by: Kaname Hanamiya
- Published by: Kadokawa Shoten
- English publisher: NA: Manga Mirai
- Imprint: Flos Comic
- Magazine: Mecha Comic; Comico Japan
- Original run: April 17, 2023 – present
- Volumes: 5
- Anime television series
- Directed by: Naoyuki Kuzuya; Shūsaku Katō (assistant)
- Written by: Mitsutaka Hirota
- Music by: Tsubasa Itō
- Studio: Studio Lings
- Original network: Tokyo MX, BS NTV, AT-X, CBC TV
- Original run: January 2027 – scheduled

The Final-Boss Prince Is Somehow Obsessed with the Chubby Villainess: Reincarnated Me (Japanese: おデブ悪女に転生したら、なぜかラスボス王子様に執着されています, Hepburn: Odebu Akujo ni Tensei Shitara, Naze ka Rasu Bosu Ōji-sama ni Shūchaku Sareteimasu) is a Japanese manga series released as a webtoon written by Kotoko and illustrated by Kaname Hanamiya. It began serialization on the Mecha Comic and Comico Japan websites in April 2023, with its volume releases handled by Kadokawa Shoten. An anime television series adaptation produced by Studio Lings is set to premiere on January 2027.

== Synopsis ==
After dying of an illness, the protagonist gets reincarnated into a novel titled Goddess' Love. She gets reincarnated into the villainess of the novel, Celine Eldred, a character who is fated to have a horrible ending. In her attempts to avoid her fate, she decides to change her attitude, but she catches the attention of the final boss character, Wilfred Percival, who is smitten with her.

== Characters ==
Celine Eldred (セリーヌ・エルドレッド, Serīne Erudoreddo)
Voiced by: Haruka Shiraishi
Adele Eldred (アデル・エルドレッド, Aderu Erudoreddo)
Voiced by: Fūka Izumi
Wilfred Percival (ウィルフレッド・パーシヴァル, Uirufureddo Pāshivuaru)
Voiced by: Takeo Ōtsuka
Lewis Percival (ルイス・パーシヴァル, Ruisu Pāshivuaru)
Voiced by: Shun'ichi Toki

== Media ==
=== Manga ===
Written by Kotoko and illustrated by Kaname Hanamiya, The Final-Boss Prince Is Somehow Obsessed with the Chubby Villainess: Reincarnated Me began serialization on the Mecha Comic and Comico Japan websites on April 17, 2023. Its chapters have been compiled into five (including one released digital-only) tankōbon volumes published under Kadokawa Shoten's Flos Comic imprint as of February 2026. The series is published digitally in English on NTT Docomo's Manga Mirai website.

| No. | Japanese release date | Japanese ISBN |
|---|---|---|
| 1 | October 4, 2024 | 978-4-04-684213-8 |
| 2 | October 4, 2024 | 978-4-04-684214-5 |
| 3 | June 5, 2025 | 978-4-04-684814-7 |
| 4 | June 5, 2025 | 978-4-04-684815-4 |
| 5 | February 14, 2026 | — |

=== Anime ===
An anime television series adaptation was announced on February 13, 2026. The series will be produced by Studio Lings and directed by Naoyuki Kuzuya, with Mitsutaka Hirota handling series composition, Shūsaku Katō serving as assistant director, Fumino Kakihata and Yukiko Sekita designing the characters, and Tsubasa Itō composing the music. It is set to premiere in January 2027 on Tokyo MX and other networks.

== See also ==
- Breaking Up Was the Plan, the Duke Falling For the Villainess Was Not!, a light novel series with the same writer
- Grinding My Way to a Happy Ending: If Only My OP Big Bro Didn't Make Things So (Sister) Complex!, a light novel series with the same writer
- In Another World, My Sister Stole My Name, another manga series with the same writer
