= Seria Fukagawa =

Japanese voice actress

- 深川 芹亜
- Born: September 26, 1995 (age 30); Saga Prefecture, Japan
- Occupation: Voice actress
- Years active: 2014–present
- Agent: Axl-One
- Notable credit: Glasslip as Tōko Fukami

Seria Fukagawa (深川 芹亜, Fukagawa Seria; born September 26, 1995) is a Japanese voice actress from Saga Prefecture who is affiliated with Axl-One.

== Filmography ==
=== Television animation ===
2014

- Glasslip as Tōko Fukami
- HappinessCharge PreCure! as Female student (ep 16), Alo-Alo (ep 28), Mao's friend, Cure Shelly
- The Irregular at Magic High School as Third High School Student
- Locodol as Manami Kurohime (eps 11-12)
- Magimoji Rurumo as Schoolgirl
- Persona 4: The Golden Animation as Schoolgirl B

2015

- Assassination Classroom as Schoolgirl (ep 5)
- Concrete Revolutio as Rose (ep 11)
- Ketsuekigata-kun! 2 as Female student
- Miss Monochrome: The Animation 3 as Magical girl (ep 11), Female guest (ep 12)

2016

- Sekkō Boys as High school girl, Beautiful woman (ep 6)
- Concrete Revolutio: The Last Song as Rose
- Kabaneri of the Iron Fortress as Hatsune (ep 2)
- Naria Girls as Urara

2017

- A Centaur's Life as Himeno Kimihara

2018

- Ongaku Shōjo as Hanako Yamadaki

2021

- Super Cub as Female student

2023

- Stardust Telepath as Yū Akeuchi

2025

- Reincarnated as the Daughter of the Legendary Hero and the Queen of Spirits as Ellen

2026

- Jack-of-All-Trades, Party of None as Rain Hagwell

=== Theatrical animation ===
2014

- Eiga HappinessCharge Pretty Cure! Ningyō no Kuni no ballerina as Tsumugi's Friend B

2016

- Digimon Adventure tri.- Chapter 2: Determination
- Digimon Adventure tri.- Chapter 3: Confession

=== Video games ===
2015

- Granado Espada as Anisse
- School Fanfare

2016

- Grimms Notes as Hagoromo Tennyo
- SA7 SILENT ABILITY SEVEN as Chiharu Naruse

2018

- The Idolmaster Cinderella Girls as Hinako Kita

=== Radio ===
- Glasslip ~ Kazemichiradio ~ (HiBiKi Radio Station: June 30, 2014 - October 13, 2014)
- A & G NEXT BREAKS FIVE STARS (chō! A & G+: April 6, 2015 – present (Tuesday personality) )

=== Dubbing roles ===
==== Film ====
- Big Eyes as Lily
- Luna Petunia as Luna
