= Glasslip =

Japanese anime television series

- Promotional image for the series featuring the main protagonists.

グラスリップ (Gurasurippu)
- Genre: Drama, romance, slice of life
- Anime television series
- Directed by: Junji Nishimura
- Written by: Rika Satō, Junji Nishimura
- Music by: Akito Matsuda
- Studio: P.A. Works
- Licensed by: NA: Sentai Filmworks
- Original network: Tokyo MX, Sun TV, FTB, KBS, TV Aichi, AT-X, BS Nittele, ITC, BBT
- Original run: July 3, 2014 – September 25, 2014
- Episodes: 13
- Manga

Hina's Lip
- Written by: Kazemichi
- Illustrated by: Mayumi Katō
- Published by: Pony Canyon
- Magazine: Ponimaga
- Original run: July 3, 2014 – December 18, 2014
- Light novel
- Written by: Yoshimori Uchi
- Illustrated by: Shino
- Published by: Pony Canyon
- Original run: October 3, 2014 – July 3, 2015
- Volumes: 3

Glasslip (グラスリップ, Gurasurippu) is a 13-episode Japanese anime television series produced by P.A. Works and directed by Junji Nishimura. The screenplay is written by Rika Satō and Junji Nishimura with character designs by Miki Takeshita. The anime aired in Japan between July and September 2014. A manga adaptation was serialized in Pony Canyon's Ponimaga online magazine, and a light novel series has also been published.

== Plot ==
Tōko Fukami's family runs a glass-working business in a small seaside town named Hinodehama (日乃出浜; "Sunrise Beach"). She hangs out with her four best friends at a cafe called Kazemichi (カゼミチ; "Wind Way"). During the summer break of their senior year in high school, they meet a transfer student named Kakeru Okikura, who claims that a voice from the future talks to him, and that it has led him to Tōko.

== Characters ==
=== Main characters ===
Tōko Fukami (深水 透子, Fukami Tōko)
Voiced by: Seria Fukagawa
Tōko is a high school student from Fukui Prefecture and she is the protagonist of Glasslip. She is the daughter of a glass workshop owner, and she dreams of becoming a glass artisan. She has big hazel eyes and long brown hair. She has a cheerful personality and never seems to be upset. She likes to draw. When she focuses on glass, she can see images from the future. She has feelings for Kakeru.
Kakeru Okikura (沖倉 駆, Okikura Kakeru)
Voiced by: Ryōta Ōsaka
Kakeru is a mysterious and aloof high school student who appears to have some relationship with Tōko. He has black hair and blue eyes. He recently transferred student and is a third year. Tōko's first impression of Kakeru was "David". He has feelings for Tōko.
Yanagi Takayama (高山 やなぎ, Takayama Yanagi)
Voiced by: Saori Hayami
Yanagi is a high school student who is taking lessons to become a model. Yanagi has olive brown eyes and mid-length brown hair. Yanagi sometimes has a tsundere-like personality, but usually is cheerful and participates in most conversations. She has feelings for Yukinari and is close friends with Tōko.
Yukinari Imi (井美 雪哉, Imi Yukinari)
Voiced by: Nobunaga Shimazaki
Yukinari is Yanagi's step brother. He is on his high school's track team, but is in rehabilitation at the beginning of the series. He has black hair and dark green eyes. He is a cool and laid back and in his third year much like his friends. He had feelings for Tōko and was jealous of Kakeru.
Sachi Nagamiya (永宮 幸, Nagamiya Sachi)
Voiced by: Risa Taneda
Sachi is a quiet and soft spoken third-year high school student. She has black shoulder-length hair and violet eyes. She is usually seen wearing her glasses and reading a book. Upon their first meeting, Sachi takes a disliking to Kakeru.
Hiro Shirosaki (白崎 祐, Shirosaki Hiro)
Voiced by: Daiki Yamashita
Hiro is a cheerful high school student who is always seen smiling. He has brown hair pulled back with a white band and has dark brown eyes. He has feelings for Sachi. His grandfather runs a cafe called Kazemichi where he and his friends often hang out.

=== Other characters ===
- Ken Fukami (深水 健, Fukami Ken) is Tōko's and Hina's father. He runs a glass workshop named Yataglass Studio. Voiced by: Hiroyuki Kinoshita
- Mari Fukami (深水 真理, Fukami Mari) is Tōko's and Hina's mother. Voiced by: Rieko Takahashi
- Hina Fukami (深水 陽菜, Fukami Hina) is Tōko's younger sister and is a junior high school student. She is in the school's swimming club. She acknowledges Yukinari for his passion for running. She's seen smiling when her swimming club teammates noticed Yukinari with a girl, possibly with Yanagi. Voiced by: Nao Tōyama
- Momo Shirosaki (白崎 百, Shirosaki Momo) is Hiro's older sister and is a college student. She just got her driver's license. Voiced by: Ai Kayano
- Matasaburou Shirosaki (白崎 又三郎, Shirosaki Matasaburō) is Hiro's grandfather who runs Kazemichi cafe. Voiced by: Tomomichi Nishimura
- Toshihiro Okikura (沖倉 利尋, Okikura Toshihiro) is Kakeru's father. Voiced by: Yūji Takada
- Miwako Okikura (沖倉 美和子, Okikura Miwako) is Kakeru's mother and a pianist. Voiced by: Atsuko Tanaka
- Suzune Nagamiya (永宮 すゝね, Nagamiya Suzune) is Sachi's mother. Voiced by: Miki Itō

== Media ==
=== Print ===
A manga adaptation titled Hina's Lip (陽菜'S リップ), written by Kazemichi and illustrated by Mayumi Katō, was serialized in Pony Canyon's online manga magazine Ponimaga from July 3 to December 18, 2014. A three-volume light novel series, written by Yoshimori Uchi and illustrated by Shino, were published by Pony Canyon under their Ponican Book imprint from October 3, 2014, to July 3, 2015.

=== Anime ===
The 13-episode anime television series is produced by P.A. Works and is directed by Junji Nishimura. The series aired between July 3 and September 25, 2014, on Tokyo MX. The screenplay is written by Rika Satō and Junji Nishimura, and the music is produced by Akito Matsuda. The opening theme is "Natsu no Hi to Kimi no Koe" (夏の日と君の声; "A Summer Day with Your Voice") by ChouCho, the ending theme is "Tōmei na Sekai" (透明な世界; "Transparent World") by Nano Ripe, and the image song is "Lucent Eyes" (ルーセントアイズ) by ChouCho. The series was simulcast in the United States, Canada, Australia, New Zealand, South Africa, Turkey, Latin America, parts of Europe, the Middle East, and North Africa by the Internet streaming website Crunchyroll. The anime has been licensed in North America by Sentai Filmworks.

==== Episode list ====
| No. | Title | Original release date |
|---|---|---|
| 1 | "Fireworks"; Transliteration: "Hanabi" (Japanese: 花火) | July 3, 2014 |
| 2 | "Bench"; Transliteration: "Benchi" (Japanese: ベンチ) | July 10, 2014 |
| 3 | "Utility Tank"; Transliteration: "Poritanku" (Japanese: ポリタンク) | July 17, 2014 |
| 4 | "Steep Road"; Transliteration: "Sakamichi" (Japanese: 坂道) | July 24, 2014 |
| 5 | "Hinode Bridge"; Transliteration: "Hinode-bashi" (Japanese: 日乃出橋) | July 31, 2014 |
| 6 | "Punch"; Transliteration: "Panchi" (Japanese: パンチ) | August 7, 2014 |
| 7 | "Bicycle"; Transliteration: "Jitensha" (Japanese: 自転車) | August 14, 2014 |
| 8 | "Snow"; Transliteration: "Yuki" (Japanese: 雪) | August 21, 2014 |
| 9 | "Moon"; Transliteration: "Tsuki" (Japanese: 月) | August 28, 2014 |
| 10 | "Jonathan"; Transliteration: "Jonasan" (Japanese: ジョナサン) | September 4, 2014 |
| 11 | "Piano"; Transliteration: "Piano" (Japanese: ピアノ) | September 11, 2014 |
| 12 | "Fireworks (Again)"; Transliteration: "Hanabi (Futatabi)" (Japanese: 花火（再び）) | September 18, 2014 |
| 13 | "Shooting Star"; Transliteration: "Ryūsei" (Japanese: 流星) | September 25, 2014 |

== Reception ==
Matt Packard of Anime News Network praised Glasslip for being visually beautiful, but criticized it for the generic characters, the lack of explanations for the supernatural phenomena introduced at the beginning of the series, and the presence of too many incongruities. Stig Høgset, writing for THEM Anime Reviews, also praised the striking visuals but found the characters believable and showed maturity when dealing with their respective relationships. Høgset ultimately found the show disappointing because its great start was marred by Tōko's visions leading toward a vague conclusion, saying that it "basically sells its own gimmick as a huge waste of time." Isaac Akers of The Fandom Post praised the series for its "aesthetic expression of [the concept of] mono no aware" through a traditional romantic drama narrative with characters that deliver organic teenage angst but said that its appeal depends on the viewer, concluding that: "It's unlike anything else I've seen, and its numerous strengths in expressing its core theme make for a show that's fascinating to watch. It's not a show that I'd recommend to everyone, but for those who are looking for what Glasslip is offering, you won't be let down." Chris Beveridge, also from The Fandom Post, called it a visual delight while its characters traverse through interesting relationships (highlighting both the Sachi/Hiro and Yanagi/Yukinari pairings), but felt it was one of PA Works' weaker shows, concluding that the series "as a whole is pretty well put together but is just missing something critical, a spark of some sort, to take it the next level."
