= Uncle's Obsession with Cute Things =

Japanese manga series

- First tankōbon volume cover

おじさんはカワイイものがお好き。 (Ojisan wa Kawaii Mono ga Osuki)
- Genre: Comedy
- Manga
- Written by: Tsutomu
- Published by: Flex Comix
- Imprint: Polaris Comics
- Magazine: Comic Polaris
- Original run: July 6, 2017 – present
- Volumes: 13
- Television drama

Pops Loves Kawaii Stuff
- Directed by: Izuru Kumasaka
- Written by: Fumi Tsubota
- Music by: Akihiro Manabe
- Studio: Daiei TV; ytv
- Original network: NNS (ytv, Nippon TV)
- Original run: August 13, 2020 – September 10, 2020
- Episodes: 5
- Anime television series
- Directed by: Tomoe Makino
- Written by: Yū Sato
- Music by: Arisa Okehazama
- Studio: Liden Films
- Licensed by: Crunchyroll: SEA: Medialink
- Original network: Tokyo MX, ytv, BS Asahi
- Original run: October 4, 2026 – present
- Episodes: 6

Uncle's Obsession with Cute Things (Japanese: おじさんはカワイイものがお好き。, Hepburn: Ojisan wa Kawaii Mono ga Osuki; lit. 'Older Men Like Cute Things', alternatively titled Pops Loves Kawaii Stuff) is a Japanese manga series written and illustrated by Tsutomu. It has been serialized online via Flex Comix's Comic Polaris website since July 2017 and has been collected in thirteen tankōbon volumes. A television drama adaptation aired from August to September 2020, and an anime television series adaptation produced by Liden Films premiered in October 2026.

== Plot ==
Mitsutaka Oji is a handsome 42-year-old man. However, he harbors a secret: he likes small and cute things, particularly the mascot character Pagtaro, which is a secret he struggles to keep.

== Characters ==
Mitsutaka Oji (小路三貴, Oji Mitsutaka)
Voiced by: Kenjiro Tsuda (voice comic), Kazuyuki Okitsu (anime)
Portrayed by: Hidekazu Mashima
Oji is a 42-year-old salaryman and the chief manager of section 1 in his company. He secretly loves cute things, especially the mascot character Pagtaro, but hides it from others.
Masumi Nii (仁井真純, Nii Masumi)
Voiced by: Ayumu Murase (anime)
Portrayed by: Taiyu Fujiwara
Masumi is Oji's nephew from the United States who moves in with him to pursue his dreams of becoming a manga artist.
Wataru Naruto (鳴戸渡, Naruto Wataru)
Voiced by: Takuya Satō (voice comic), Yuki Kaji (anime)
Portrayed by: Renn Kiriyama
Naruto is the chief manager of section 2 at Oji's company. He views Oji as a rival and attempts to sabotage his reputation. He secretly loves cats and is unsuccessful in getting close to them.
Kenta Kawai (河合ケンタ, Kawai Kenta)
Voiced by: Takuya Eguchi (anime)
Portrayed by: Tsubasa Imai
Kawai is man who Oji meets. Like Oji, he also loves cute things, especially the mascot series Bear's School.
Rio Moriko (茂科莉央, Moriko Rio)
Voiced by: Kaori Maeda (anime)
Portrayed by: Miu Tomita
Moriko is a subordinate under Oji's division.
Miku Usuma (臼間未来, Usuma Miku)
Voiced by: Miharu Hanai (anime)
Portrayed by: Ayu Manaka
Usuma is a subordinate under Oji's division.
Haruo Kiba (木庭春生, Kiba Haruo)
Voiced by: Satoshi Niwa (anime)
Portrayed by: Ron Mizuma
Kiba is a subordinate under Oji's division.
Hoho Takebayashi (武林穂歩, Takebayashi Hoho)
Voiced by: Mie Sonozaki (anime)
Portrayed by: Mirai Yamamoto
Takebayashi is Oji's ex-wife and former boss.
Tōji Furū (古宇東二, Furū Tōji)
Portrayed by: Masakazu Sato
Pagtaro (パグ太郎, Pagutarō) (Note: Pagtaro's name is spelled "Pugtaro" in Crunchyroll's subtitles.)
Voiced by: Miyu Tomita (anime)
Bosskichi (ボス吉, Bosukichi)
Voiced by: Fūka Izumi (anime)
Anne (アン, An)
Voiced by: Yurie Funato (anime)
Carrie (キャリー, Kyarī)
Voiced by: Asami Tano (anime)
Greapy (グレピ, Gurepi)
Voiced by: Hinata Satō (anime)

== Media ==
=== Manga ===
Written and illustrated by Tsutomu, Uncle's Obsession with Cute Things began serialization on Flex Comix's Comic Polaris website on July 6, 2017. Its chapters were collected into thirteen tankōbon volumes released from May 15, 2018 to October 15, 2026.

No.	Release date	ISBN
1	May 15, 2018	978-4-86675-012-5
2	September 15, 2018	978-4-86675-027-9
3	August 8, 2019	978-4-86675-071-2
4	April 15, 2020	978-4-86675-104-7
5	November 13, 2020	978-4-86675-128-3
6	August 6, 2021	978-4-86675-163-4
7	April 15, 2022	978-4-86675-210-5
8	December 15, 2022	978-4-86675-257-0
9	August 8, 2023	978-4-86675-304-1
10	April 15, 2024	978-4-86675-353-9
11	February 14, 2025	978-4-86675-413-0
12	August 7, 2026	978-4-86675-519-9
13	October 15, 2026	978-4-86675-530-4

=== Drama ===
A television drama adaptation was announced on June 26, 2020. Directed by Izuru Kumasaka and written by Fumi Tsubota, the series aired on the Platinum Night Thursday Drama F programming block on ytv, Nippon TV and their affiliates from August 13 to September 10, 2020.

==== Episodes ====
No.	Title (Note: Episode titles are taken from the episode previews.)	Directed by	Written by	Original release date
1	"Mitsutaka Oji Lives While Hiding the Fact That He's "an Uncle Who Loves Cute Things." (Note: Alternatively titled "The Handsome Uncle's Secret" (イケオジの秘密, Ike-oji no Himitsu).)"; Transliteration: "Oji Mitsutaka wa, "Kawaii Mono Suki na Oji-san" to Iu Koto o Kakushite Ikiteiru." (Japanese: 小路三貴は、「カワイイもの好きなおじさん」ということを隠して生きている。)	Izuru Kumasaka	Fumi Tsubota	August 13, 2020
Oji is well-admired at his company, but he is secretly a fan of the mascot character Pagtaro. While trying to get a rare Pagtaro keyholder from a gachapon, Oji accidentally loses it when he is spotted by Kawai. Meanwhile, Masumi moves in with Oji, forcing him to hide his Pagtaro merchandise. When Oji accidentally loses his Pagtaro keyholder, Naruto finds it and attempts to humiliate him by forcing him to admit the keyholder belongs to him in front of their co-workers. Oji is able to successfully hide his adoration for Pagtaro, but Kawai arrives at his office, revealing to Oji that he has joined his company as a contractor for a new project.
2	"Oji Goes to a Fancy Shop with a Like-minded Person (Note: Alternatively titled "The First Like-minded Person?!" (はじめての同志!?, Hajimete no Dōshi!?).)"; Transliteration: "Oji-san, Dōshi to Fanshī Shoppu e Iku" (Japanese: 小路さん、同志とファンシーショップへ行く)	Izuru Kumasaka	Fumi Tsubota	August 20, 2020
Oji and Kawai bond over their love of cute things and make plans to visit a character goods shop, but Oji becomes self-conscious about being open about his adoration for Pagtaro, which makes their outing awkward. While visiting a cat café, they find Naruto, who makes Oji question his friendship with Kawai. Later, Masumi falls sick, but Oji is obligated to go apologize to his company's business partners due to his division making a critical mistake, and Kawai offers to take care of Masumi in his stead. Realizing Kawai's intentions are genuine, Oji accepts Kawai as a friend.
3	"Oji Wants to Buy Local Merchandise (Note: Alternatively titled "The Friendly Business Trip Arc, Raided by the Ex-Wife!" (仲良く出張編!元妻襲来, Nakayoku Shucchō-hen! Moto Tsuma Shūrai).)"; Transliteration: "Oji-san wa, Go-tōji Guzzu ga Kaitai" (Japanese: 小路さんは、ご当地グッズが買いたい)	Izuru Kumasaka	Fumi Tsubota	August 27, 2020
Oji, Kawai, and Naruto go on a business trip to Sendai. Though Oji plans on shopping for exclusive Pagtaro merchandise with Kawai, the two are interrupted by Takebayashi, Oji's ex-wife and former boss. Oji finds closure with Takebayashi and feels encouraged to be more open about his adoration for Pagtaro, while Kawai begins feeling distant from Oji as he realizes he knows little about him.
3.5	"What's in the Bags of Oji and Friends"; Transliteration: "Oji-san-tachi no Kaban no Chūshin" (Japanese: 小路さんたちのカバンの中身)	Izuru Kumasaka	Fumi Tsubota	August 28, 2020 (Note: The episode was released exclusively on Hulu Japan.)
4	"Oji Takes on the Challenge of a Surprise! (Note: Alternatively titled "Like-mindedness... Taking on the Challenge of a Surprise" (同志…サプライズに挑戦, Dōshi... Sapuraizu ni Chōsen).)"; Transliteration: "Oji-san, Sapuraizu ni Chōsen!" (Japanese: 小路さん、サプライズに挑戦!)	Izuru Kumasaka	Fumi Tsubota	September 3, 2020
Oji and Kawai's project ends next month, leading both to feel uncertain about whether their friendship will continue. Oji wins tickets to a Pagtaro show and decides to invite Kawai as a surprise. However, Kawai becomes self-conscious about liking cute things and even denies liking them at a reunion with his high school classmates, which Oji overhears. Meanwhile, Masumi falls into a slump after his manga gets criticized on social media, but he befriends Naruto and helps him him appeal to cats. The two encourage each other to embrace what they like.
4.5	"The Melancholy of New Naruto"; Transliteration: "Nyū Naruto no Yūutsu" (Japanese: ニュー鳴戸の憂鬱)	Izuru Kumasaka	Fumi Tsubota	September 4, 2020
5	"Oji Runs! (Note: Alternatively titled "PAGTARO!" (パグ太郎!!!!!!, Pagutarō!!!!!!).)"; Transliteration: "Oji-san, Hashiru!" (Japanese: 小路さん、走る!!!!!!)	Izuru Kumasaka	Fumi Tsubota	September 10, 2020
Oji and Kawai become distant, but through Naruto's advice and Masumi's encouragement, they apologize to each other and stay as friends, promising each other to be more open about liking cute things. Though the Pagtaro show has ended by the time Oji and Kawai arrive, Oji is still able to take a photo with Pagtaro. Meanwhile, Masumi is approached by an editor to publish his manga and decides to debut professionally.
After–Story	"A Home Party with Oji and Friends"; Transliteration: "Oji-san-tachi no Hōmu Pātī" (Japanese: 小路さんたちのホームパーティー)	Izuru Kumasaka	Fumi Tsubota	September 11, 2020

=== Anime ===
An anime television series adaptation was announced on November 8, 2025. The series is produced by Liden Films and directed by Tomoe Makino, with Yū Sato handling series composition, Tomomi Kimura designing the characters, and Arisa Okehazama composing the music. It premiered on October 4, 2026, on Tokyo MX and other networks. the opening theme song is "LIKE³" performed by Yusei Yagi, and the ending theme song is "Tōtoi♡Kaiwai" (尊い♡界隈; 'Precious Neighborhood') performed by Kaori Maeda. Crunchyroll is streaming the series under the title Uncle's Obsession with Cute Things. Medialink licensed the series.

=== Other ===
In commemoration of the release of its fourth volume on April 15, 2020, a voice comic adaptation was released on BookLive's YouTube channel on April 10. It featured the voice performances of Kenjiro Tsuda and Takuya Satō.
