= Naria Girls =

Japanese anime television series

- Main visual, featuring (left to right) Animaru, Hanabi, Urara and Inaho

魔法少女? なりあ☆がーるず (Mahō Shōjo? Naria☆Garuzu)
- Genre: Magical girl
- Anime television series

Mahō Shōjo? Naria Girls
- Directed by: Kōtarō Ishidate
- Studio: Bouncy
- Licensed by: TBA: Crunchyroll
- Original network: Tokyo MX, Sun TV
- Original run: July 6, 2016 – September 22, 2016
- Episodes: 12

Naria Girls known in Japan as Mahō Shōjo? Naria Girls (魔法少女? なりあ☆がーるず, Mahō Shōjo? Naria☆Garuzu; "Magical Girl? Naria Girls") is a Japanese anime television series produced by Bouncy studio. The series is marketed as a "user participation" anime by its producers. The name of the series makes use of a pun; "Nariagaru" which means "rising in the world".

== Plot ==
Urara, Hanabi, and Inaho aim to become popular throughout Japan by rendering themselves in the anime medium. They decide that the theme of their anime would be magical girls in order to appeal to a wide demographic; from children to adults. The three broadcast their one-cour magical girl anime to the public.

== Character ==
Urara (うらら)
Voiced by: Seria Fukagawa
Urara is a protagonist with short pink hair who occupies the center position. Her backstory establishes that she was raised by her grandmother, having been told that her mother passed away when she was very young. Her signature color is pink.
Hanabi (はなび)
Voiced by: Aoi Koga
Hanabi is a young girl defined by the attributes of blonde hair, a flat chest, and twintails. Her nickname is "Bomber Hanage." Her signature color is light blue.
Inaho (いなほ)
Voiced by: Yūki Kuwahara
Inaho is a young girl with black hair and a large bust. She is an intelligent young lady from a wealthy family. She occasionally wears glasses. Her signature color is purple.
Animaru (アニまる)
Voiced by: Kōtarō Ishidate
Animaru is a white creature from the Kingdom of Nariadia.

== Production ==
Naria Girls was produced by the Bouncy, an animation studio, with the use of Kigurumi Live Animator KiLA, a real-time live animation software. The software was used to animate the CGI-rendered characters real-time through motion capture. Okazu Misoyama was responsible for the character design of the series.

== Media ==
=== Anime ===
Naria Girls premiered in Japan on July 6, 2016, on Tokyo MX with the series also broadcast on Sun TV as well as streamed in NicoNico service in Japan.

The theme song of the series entitled "We Are Naria ☆ Girls" (We are なりあ☆がーるず) was performed by Seria Fukagawa, Aoi Koga, and Yūki Kuwahara, the three main cast. Hajime who also performs the theme song was responsible for the arrangement of the song and Jun'ichi Inoue was behind the composition.

Crunchyroll announced in July 2016 that it has acquired rights to stream the anime with stream dates and regional availability yet to be disclosed.
