= Highspeed Etoile =

Japanese anime television series

- First Japanese Blu-ray volume cover, featuring Rin Rindō
- Genre: Sports (Auto racing)
- Manga

Highspeed Etoile: L'Entrée de Towa et Kanata
- Written by: Chiaki Misono
- Published by: Akita Shoten
- Imprint: Champion Red Comics
- Magazine: Manga Cross
- Original run: October 23, 2023 – present
- Volumes: 1
- Anime television series
- Directed by: Keitaro Motonaga
- Written by: Takamitsu Kōno
- Music by: First Call Music
- Studio: Studio A-Cat
- Licensed by: Crunchyroll: SA/SEA: Medialink
- Original network: JNN (MBS, TBS), BS-TBS
- Original run: April 6, 2024 – June 22, 2024
- Episodes: 12
- icon

Highspeed Etoile (stylized as HIGHSPEED Étoile) is a Japanese original anime television series animated by Studio A-Cat, directed by Keitaro Motonaga and written by Takamitsu Kōno. The series features original character designs by Takuya Fujima. Originally created as a collaboration with the Japanese Super Formula Championship for its 50th anniversary, it also later collaborated with Formula E's Tokyo ePrix, and Formula One's Japanese Grand Prix. The series aired from April to June 2024. A new anime project has been announced.

== Characters ==
Rin Rindō (輪堂 凜, Rindō Rin)
Voiced by: Fūka Izumi
Kanata Asakawa (浅河 カナタ, Asakawa Kanata)
Voiced by: Yoko Hikasa
Towa Komachi (小町 永遠, Komachi Towa)
Voiced by: Shiori Izawa
Sofia Bryant Tokitō (ソフィア・ブライアント・時任, Sofia Buraianto Tokito)
Voiced by: Yui Horie
Liu Youran (劉 悠然, Ryū Yōran)
Voiced by: Ayaka Suwa
Alice Summerwood (アリス・ サマーウッド, Arisu Samāuddo)
Voiced by: Nana Mizuki
Richard Parker (リチャード・パーカー, Richādo Pākā)
Voiced by: Kenichirou Matsuda
Lorenzo M. Salvatore (ロレンツォ・M・サルヴァトーレ, Rorentsuo M. Saruvuatōre)
Voiced by: Kohsuke Toriumi
Hikari Hinata (日向 光莉, Hinata Hikari)
Voiced by: Yurie Funato
Akari Kuzuryū (九頭竜 明莉, Kuzuryū Akari)
Voiced by: Shu Uchida
Ami
Voiced by: Yukari Tamura
Chitose Kagura
Voiced by: Marina Inoue
Genjirō Hinata
Voiced by: Tsuyoshi Koyama
Narrator
Voiced by: Tōru Furuya

== Media ==
=== Manga ===
A spin-off manga series illustrated by Chiaki Misono in cooperation with the Suzuka Circuit, titled Highspeed Etoile: L'Entrée de Towa et Kanata, began serialization on Akita Shoten's Manga Cross website on October 23, 2023. The manga's chapters have been collected into a single tankōbon volume as of April 2024.

No.	Release date	ISBN
1	April 18, 2024	978-4-253-32075-7

=== Anime ===
The original anime television series was announced on July 15, 2022, with Takuya Fujima as original character designer. It is animated by Studio A-Cat, directed by Keitaro Motonaga, and written by Takamitsu Kōno, with First Call Music composing the music, and Yasunori Ebina as sound director. The series aired from April 6 to June 22, 2024, on the Animeism programming block on MBS and TBS, as well as their affiliates and BS-TBS. (Note: MBS and TBS listed the series premiere on April 5, 2024, at 25:53, which is effectively April 6 at 1:53 a.m. JST.) The opening theme song is "ADRENALIZED", performed by Nana Mizuki, while the ending theme song is "Fanfare", performed by Scandal. Crunchyroll streamed the series. Medialink licensed the series in Asia-Pacific (except Australia and New Zealand) and streams it on the Ani-One Asia YouTube channel.

On November 25, 2024, Takuya Fujima revealed that a new anime project for Highspeed Etoile is in production.

==== Episodes ====
No.	Title (Note: All English titles are taken from Crunchyroll.)	Directed by	Written by	Storyboarded by	Original release date
1	"Underneath Fuji's Sky"; Transliteration: "Fuji no Sora no Shita de" (Japanese: 富士の空の下で)	Keitaro Motonaga	Takamitsu Kōno	Goichi Iwahata	April 6, 2024
In the near future, the development of the High Performance Exceed Reactor (HyPER) has revolutionized the field of racing, giving rise to the NEX Race. Lorenzo "The King" M. Salvatore remains the Nex Race's undefeated champion with Alice "The Queen" Summerwood being his closest challenger. In addition, the Nex Race hosts both human and AI drivers. The fifth season of Nex Race concludes with another victory for Lorenzo, with Alice again ending up in second place. The third place finisher, Falk Ogura, decides to retire, having given up any hopes of overcoming Lorenzo. In the qualifying rounds for the next year's Nex Race, rookie driver Rin Rindo participates, assisted by her race car's built in AI Ami.
2	"Debut!"; Transliteration: "Debyū!" (Japanese: デビュー!)	Keitaro Motonaga	Takamitsu Kōno	Goichi Iwahata	April 13, 2024
Rin, who was previously a gamer who specialized in winning world records in racing games, takes part in the first Nex Race of the season in the Middle East as a member of V-ZEN Racing. She is one of the season's three rookies, along with Kanata Asakawa and Towa Komachi of Izanami Racing who are very friendly to her. However, due to her inexperience, Rin loses focus at the start of the race and spins out her car, putting her at last place for most of the race. She struggles to gain the lead, determined not to finish last on her debut race. However, she ends up getting lapped by Lorenzo and Alice. Mistakenly believing that Lorenzo and Alice were both behind her in placing, Rin finally gets serious and uses her Revol Burst to pass Lorenzo. However, due to violating the rules by passing a car that lapped her, Rin is disqualified from the race, though others note how she was able to catch even Lorenzo by surprise.
3	"The Queen's Invasion"; Transliteration: "Joō Shūrai" (Japanese: 女王襲来)	Keitaro Motonaga	Takamitsu Kōno	Goichi Iwahata	April 20, 2024 (Note: This episode aired at 2:08 a.m. JST, 15 minutes after the original air time on MBS.)
After the race, Rin's performance catches Alice's attention, and she decides to organize a meeting with Rin's manager, Chitose Kagura. The next day, Alice meets Rin in person. Rin, unaware of Alice's identity as the Queen, mistakes her for a fan and treats her at her grandmother's restaurant. Alice then challenges Rin to a race in her team's racing simulator, which Chitose agrees to. During the race, the gulf between Rin and Alice's skill quickly becomes evident as she repeatedly laps Rin. However, Rin notices that Alice always passes her on the same corner where she had previously passed Lorenzo, and realizes Alice is trying to force her to replicate the same move. Rin tries to repeat the move, but spins out her car instead. Regardless, Alice still respects Rin's spirit and determination and offers her a spot on her own team, but Rin refuses. This only makes Alice respect her more and she declares Rin to be her rival. At the conclusion of the fourth race, Rin, Kanata, and Towa express frustration at being unable to pass Alice's teammate, Richard Parker. Richard reminds them that as long as they cannot pass him, they have no hope of even challenging Alice and Lorenzo. The girls take this as a challenge and are even more determined to defeat him.
4	"The King's Arrival"; Transliteration: "Oja Tōrai" (Japanese: 王者到来)	Keitaro Motonaga	Touko Machida	Bob Shirahata, Keitaro Motonaga	April 27, 2024
Over the next four rounds of the NEX race, Lorenzo and Alice trade positions while Rin consistently finishes last, much to her frustration. The race organizers then hold a public reception in Japan with all of the racers in attendance, but both Lorenzo and Rin fail to appear. Outside, Rin is unable to enter the building due to losing her guest pass and decides to take the day off. She then encounters Lorenzo, and unaware of his identity, assumes he is simply a tourist. She agrees to help him find a vintage kaiju toy and shows him around the city, including her grandmother's restaurant. Eventually, they find the toy, and Lorenzo thanks her. He then takes her to the reception, where he reveals his identity to her and acknowledges her as a rival, much to Rin's shock. The next NEX race takes place in Italy. However, a heavy rainstorm forces the race to be cancelled.
5	"Listen Carefully"; Transliteration: "Mimi wo Sumasete" (Japanese: 耳を澄ませて)	Keitaro Motonaga	Chabo Higurashi	Kia Asamiya	May 4, 2024
Round 6 of the NEX race takes place in Monaco, a track infamous for its many sharp turns. During the race, two of the racing, including Kanata, crash and eliminated from the race. Chitose learns that the owner of the V-ZEN team is personally watching the race, so she instructs Rin to follow Ami's guidance. Thanks to Ami's directions, Rin is able to advance to fifth place. In the final lap, Rin takes the advice from Ami to do whatever she wants to win, so she activates her Revol Burst to pass Sofia. Unfortunately, Rin ends up finishing in 5th place after Sofia uses her own Revol Burst to pass her and finish in 3rd place. Frustrated, Rin promises to she will beat Sofia next time, a misunderstanding causes everybody to think she is challenging Lorenzo, instead. After the race, Youran reminds Rin that they are all going to have an off-season after the final round of the NEX race. Meanwhile, Ami mulls over Rin's fifth place finish.
6	"Backmarker"; Transliteration: "Bakkumākā" (Japanese: バックマーカー)	Keitaro Motonaga	Touko Machida	Katsuyuki Koderaka, Keitaro Motonaga	May 11, 2024
The final round of the NEX race is held in Spain, where Lorenzo and Alice place in the top two while Rin remains near last place, thus concluding the first half of the season. As they return to Japan, Rin, Kanata, and Towa all dream of sweeping top 3 and being at the podium together. In order to prepare for the next season, the girls begin performing workout training. They also learn about the driving styles of the other racers and resolve to each find their own unique way of racing. Later, Chitose has Rin enter a G-Force Endurance Machine to train her harder than ever, though to everyone's surprise, Rin invited her friends along with Youran and Sophie to volunteer. After that harsh training, the girls eat at Rin's grandmother's restaurant, and then they continue to "train" at an amusement park. The girls soon learn that even Lorenzo and Alice can take their days off without training. Alice was at a cliff flying a remote control plane and Lorenzo was playing Kaiju toys with his son. However, it is unknown what Richard was doing during his free time. So they should all do the same in order to relax. Unfortunately for Rin, she gets caught by Chitose and Hikari and they force her to continue her harsh training inside the G-Force Endurance Machine.
7	"The Goddess of Luck"; Transliteration: "Kōun no Megami" (Japanese: 幸運の女神)	Keitaro Motonaga	Takamitsu Kōno	Jun Takada, Keitaro Motonaga	May 18, 2024
The second half of the NEX race season has begun, with Lorenzo and Alice placing in top two yet again and Rin finishing in 11th place in the United States. Rin wants to be praised by her pit crew, but she gets no acknowledgement unless she actually improves herself and ends up on a podium. The next round takes place in La Pa Ortiz, a unique track with many corners. As the race begins, everyone is caught by surprise when Sophia uses her Revol Burst at the start of the race to take an early lead. Sophia is able to maintain her lead, but only does so by refusing to pit for most of the race. Luckily though, a sudden rainstorm hits the track, and only Sophia and Rin have the opportunity to change to wet tires, allowing them to gain first and second position respectively. Despite having a guaranteed spot at second place, Rin decides to try to pass Sophia to get first, but she loses control during her Revol Burst and crashes, disqualifying her from the race while Sophia finishes in first. On the podium, Lorenzo remarks Sophia is the racer he fears going up against the most due to her absurdly good luck, but Sophia credits Rin for inspiring her. Meanwhile, Rin learns to her dismay that her car is totaled and cannot race for the rest of the season. She is then told that the director of V-ZEN wants to meet her next weekend.
8	"Your Driving"; Transliteration: "Anata no Hashiri" (Japanese: あなたの走り)	Keitaro Motonaga	Kojiro Nakamura	Katsuyuki Kodera, Keitaro Motonaga	May 25, 2024
Rin is on a new training to drive a Toyota 2000GT car, though to Chitose's surprise, Rin invited her friends and rivals under the belief that she would be fired. Meanwhile, Genjirou is building Rin's new car and with Ami's help, customizes its settings to perfectly suit Rin's driving style at the cost of some safety. At the training course, Rin's fiends try to drive the 2000GT but fail due to their inexperience with manual transmission. Rin then takes the wheel and is able to successfully drive the 2000GT due to learning how from her grandmother, who owned the same type of car. As Rin becomes more confident driving the 2000GT, it is revealed that Chitose, Genjirou, and Ami all came to the conclusion that Rin is more suited to driving an older style of car with manual controls rather than the modern cars with automatic systems. The owner of V-ZEN observes Rin's driving and wants Rin to beat Lorenzo in the remaining races, otherwise she will be replaced. Meanwhile, Ami reveals that Rin spun out out at the last race because she couldn't keep up with Rin's control inputs, something she feels very frustrated about.
9	"Shanghai Night Race"; Transliteration: "Shanhai Naito Rēsu" (Japanese: 上海ナイトレース)	Keitaro Motonaga	Takamitsu Kōno	Kia Asamiya	June 1, 2024
A new Season of the NEX Race begins at the Bai Yu Lan circuit at Shanghai. Despite being qualified for the next round of the race, Rin is unable to start her engine at the beginning of the race because of Genjirou changing its settings at the last minute and she is forced to retire. However, Lorenzo also retires due to his dislike of night driving. He then sits next to Rin to watch the race on screen. Meanwhile, Youran remembers how she tried to beat Lorenzo and Alice time and again, but she never ended up on a podium before. Kanata and Towa are trying to pass Richard, with the former eventually passing him and catches up to Alice. As she pits, Youran catches sight of Rin with Lorenzo, and realizing the absurdity of Rin dropping out at the start of the race, decides to get serious about racing. She catches up to Alice and Kanata and takes advantage of Alice being distracted by Kanata spinning out to gain the lead and take first place. After the race, Youran thanks Rin for being the reason why she won. Richard then arrives to congratulate Youran, and to talk to Rin about the 2000GT, revealing that he is a classic car enthusiast. Rin admits that she only borrowed the 2000GT, much to Richard's dismay.
10	"Beyond the High Speed!"; Transliteration: "Saisoku no Sono Saki e" (Japanese: 最速のその先へ)	Keitaro Motonaga	Takaaki Suzuki	Katsuyuki Kodera, Keitaro Motonaga	June 8, 2024
Round 13 of the NEX Race takes place in Osaka, and it is the Qualifying round. While performing her qualifying test, Rin is surprised when Lorenzo drives out with her, providing one of his "lectures" by showing her how to negotiate the track. Rin begins to gain more confidence, but accidentally takes a turn too fast and spins out. She is knocked unconscious and Ami is forced to take control of the car, but Rin still ends up with the fastest time. After regaining consciousness, Rin is disheartened that Ami can drive the car without her and she retreats to the racing simulator to play racing games. Ami then hacks into Rin's game and challenges her to a race, which Rin is forced to accept. However, as they race, Rin notices that she can easily beat Ami and Ami reveals that as an AI, she is limited by her programming in that she can never willingly endanger a human driver. Since she cannot win a race on her own as an AI, Ami points out she and Rin both need to work together to win. Rin regains her desire to race, but she is forced to undergo more training by Chitose as punishment for damaging her car again.
11	"The Queen's Showdown"; Transliteration: "Joō Kessen" (Japanese: 女王決戦)	Keitaro Motonaga	Takamitsu Kōno	Goichi Iwahata	June 15, 2024
It's the final round of the NEX Race, but not before Rin was forced to redo her Qualifying round. Meanwhile, the owner of V-ZEN warns the team that if Rin does not win the final race, he will disband the team. As the final race begins, Sophia uses her Revol Burst to once again take an early lead, forcing Lorenzo to go up against Richard. As the race progresses, Youran uses her skills to copy Lorenzo's ideal line and catch up with Alice and Sophia. But, improving her skills at long last, Rin passes Youran and Sophia to face off against Alice. Alice is excited at finally having a chance to properly race against Rin. However, with long enough patience, Rin uses her Revol Burst to finally pass Alice and finally takes the lead. Suddenly, Richard is forced to retire due to technical difficulties in a pit stop, giving Lorenzo a chance to rapidly pass the other racers and catches up to Rin, taking back the lead. Unwilling to admit defeat, Rin faces off against Lorenzo as they both try to take the lead.
12	"The Scenery Beyond"; Transliteration: "Sono Saki no Keshiki" (Japanese: その先の景色)	Keitaro Motonaga	Takamitsu Kōno	Goichi Iwahata	June 22, 2024
The final race continues as Rin and Lorenzo are still competing each other to take the lead. Just as Rin finally gets ahead and takes the lead back, a sudden lightning strike disables the race track's systems and all of the cars. The systems and cars are quickly restored, but Ami remains offline due to still needing to reboot, forcing Rin to race without her assistance. The race continues with Lorenzo in the lead and Rin right behind him until they both decide to pit. With the automatic pit systems still offline, though, the pit crews are forced to manually change the cars' tires. One of Lorenzo's pit crew commits a critical mistake that allows Rin's tire change to finish first and regain the lead on him. Alice attempts to hold first place against Rin and Lorenzo, but her tires fail and she is forced to retire from the race. However, in the final lap, Lorenzo takes the lead again and on the final stretch, Rin cannot find an opening to use her Revol Burst. Ami finally fully reboots and assists her, and both Rin and Lorenzo activate their Revol Bursts at the same time, with Rin narrowly winning first place. Satisfied, the owner or V-ZEN agrees to keep team operational for another year, under the condition that they win the driver's title next. After celebrating taking the podium, Rin begins to prepare for the next season of the NEX Race, and tries to think up of a suitable racing nickname for herself before settling for the title of "Étoile".

=== Video game ===
Highspeed Étoile Paddock Stories was released for the Nintendo Switch on November 21, 2024.

== See also ==
- R-15, a light novel series illustrated by Takuya Fujima
- Weiß Survive, a manga series illustrated by Takuya Fujima
- Warlords of Sigrdrifa, another original anime television series with character designs by Takuya Fujima
