= Airi Satō =

Japanese singer

- 佐藤 綺星
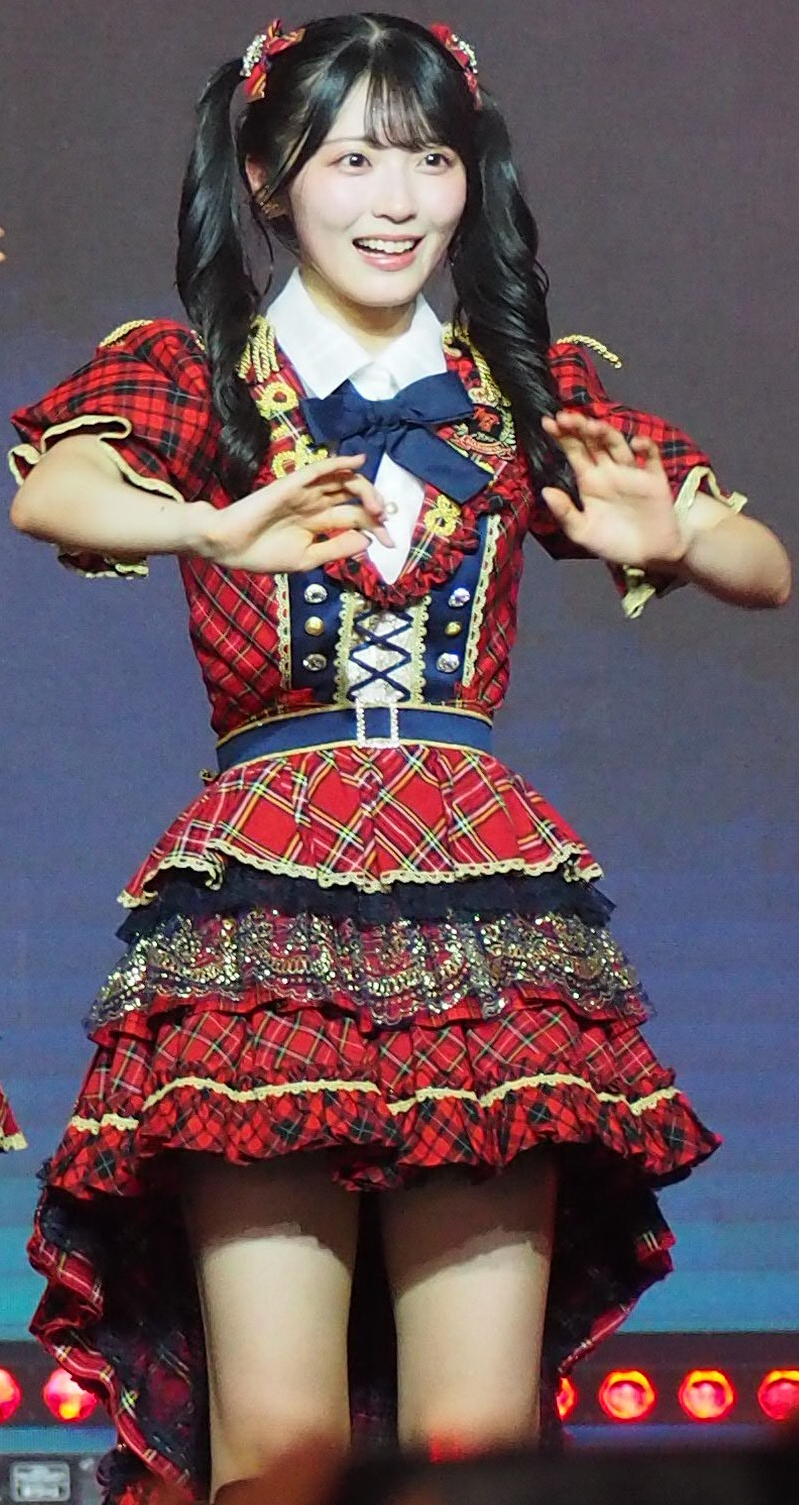
- Satō in 2026
- Born: June 24, 2004 (age 22); Chiba Prefecture, Japan
- Years active: 2024–present
- Musical career
- Genre: J-pop
- Instrument: Vocals
- Member of: AKB48
- Website: Edit this at Wikidata

Airi Satō (佐藤 綺星, Satō Airi; born June 24, 2004 in Chiba Prefecture) is a Japanese singer. She is a member of the Japanese idol girl group AKB48.

== Career ==
Satō joined the Japanese idol group AKB48 as a 17th generation trainee. Her older sister, Kiara Satō, was also an AKB48 member from 2013 to 2023. In March 2024, she became a regular member.

Her first selection for AKB48's main performance group came in October 2022, when she was selected for AKB48's 60th single "Hisashiburi no Lip Gloss".

In 2024, Satō played her first lead role on a television drama with the TV Tokyo drama Stardust Telepath. In July 2024, she became the center member on the 64th AKB48 single, "Koi Tsunjatta" for the first time. She, Azuki Yagi, and Momoka Itō have been called the "ace trio" and "new era leaders" of AKB48 and are together referred to as the Seigekka (星月花; lit. 'star, moon, flower'), after the last kanji characters of their names.

in January 2026, Satō was chosen for the cover of Weekly Playboy and released her first photo book, Tenshi no Hanshakodo (Angel’s Angle of Reflection).

== Filmography ==
=== Television ===
Year	Title	Role	Notes	Ref.
2024	Midnight Final Approach			
2024	Stardust Telepath	Umika Konohoshi		
2024	Gezan Meshi	Mayu		

== Photobooks ==
#	Title	Release Date	Publisher ISBN	Description
1	AKB48 Satō Airi 1st Shashinshū "Tenshi no Hanshakodo"; AKB48 佐藤綺星 1st写真集「天使の反射角度」; AKB48 Airi Satō 1st Photobook "Angel’s Angle of Reflection"	January 28, 2026	Shueisha ISBN 978-4-08-790214-3	First solo photobook.
