= Momoka Itō =

- 伊藤 百花
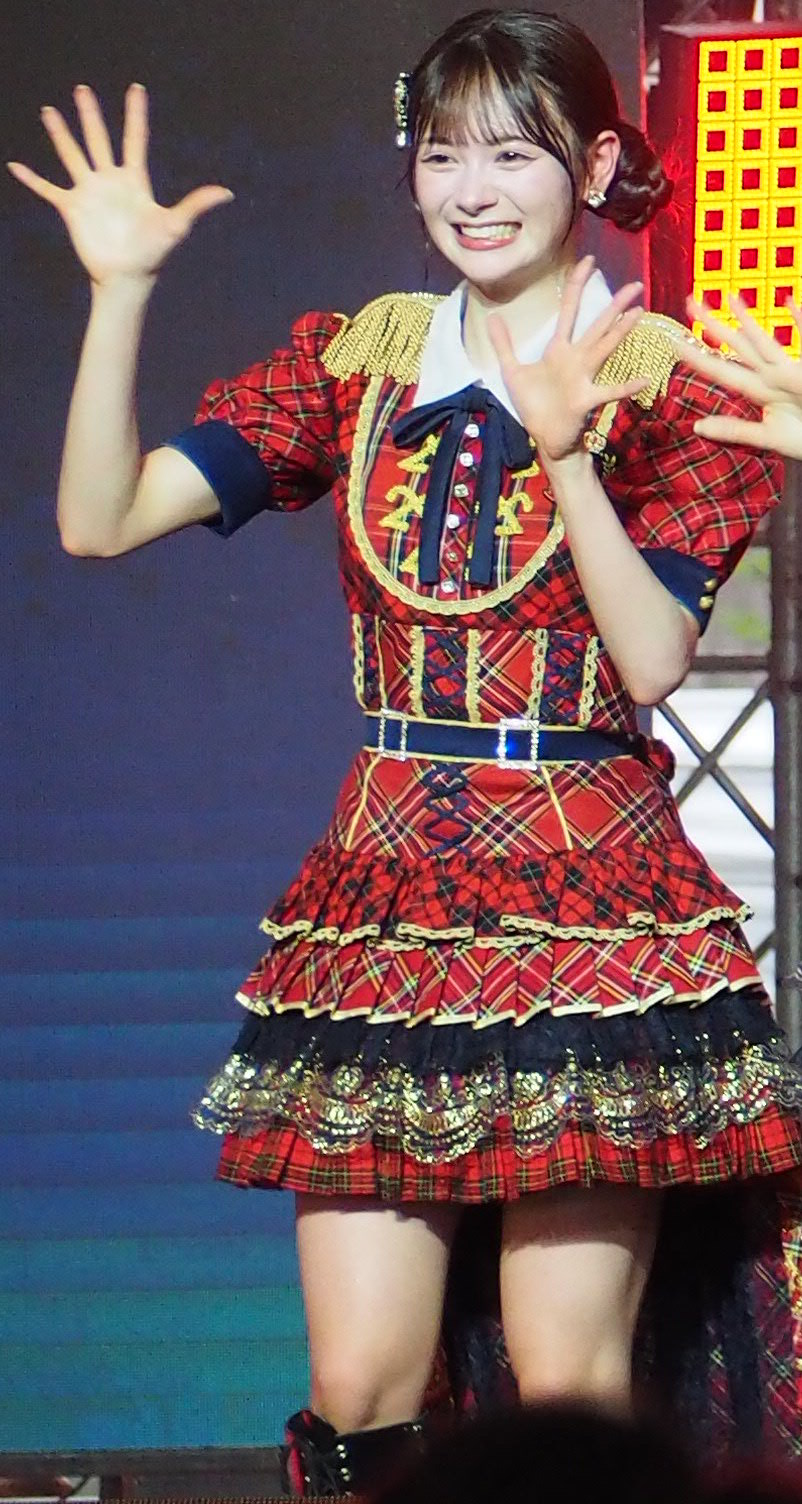
- Itō in 2026
- Born: December 6, 2003 (age 22); Saitama Prefecture, Japan
- Other names: Nana Kitano (北野夏々); Kokoko Harukaze II (二代目春風コココ, Nidaime Harukaze Kokoko)
- Occupations: Singer; actress
- Years active: 2015; 2020–2023; 2024–present
- Musical career
- Genre: J-pop
- Instrument: Vocals
- Years active: 2024–present
- Member of: AKB48
- Website: Official website

Momoka Itō (伊藤 百花, Itō Momoka; born December 6, 2003) is a Japanese singer and former child actress. She is a member of the Japanese idol girl group AKB48. Prior to joining AKB48, she was a member of the Stardust Promotion theater troupe Always Thankyou from 2020 to 2023 under the name Nana Kitano (北野夏々). Itō has been the lead performer for three AKB48 singles. She was also a regular model for the Bis fashion magazine through 2025.

== Early life ==
Itō trained in ballet since age three until her second year of middle school, and set a city record in long-distance running as a fourth-grader. She also played the flute in her school's brass band club, and obtained the Eiken Grade Pre-1 English proficiency certification during her second year of high school. She became interested in rakugo storytelling after her father, who was member of a rakugo club, took her to watch performances of children's stories at a rakugo theater. She later took a workshop taught by rakugoka Sanyutei Onimaru, where she learned the classic rakugo story "Tanusatsu".

== Career ==
Itō first became involved in the entertainment industry as early as 2015, when she appeared in a commercial for toy company Epoch Co.'s Aquabeads as a 12-year-old child actress. From 2020 to 2023, she was a member of the Stardust Promotion theater troupe Always Thankyou (formerly Do It Over) under the stage name Nana Kitano (北野夏々).

Itō has admired idols since working with them at the theater troupe, and applied for the AKB48 auditions only a month before exceeding the age limit of 19. She performed the beginning of "Tanusatsu" in the third stage of the audition. She passed as a 19th generation trainee and was publicly introduced on March 17, 2024.

Itō co-starred in the 2024 TV Tokyo drama adaptation of Stardust Telepath and appeared in a new Aquabeads commercial in 2025 after 10 years. In a collaboration project between the AKB48 Group, Bis fashion magazine, and the Showroom streaming platform to select a new Bis regular model, she won the grand prize and became a Bis regular model for one year through 2025. Her photobook, titled Hyakka Zukan (Note: 百花図鑑, Hyakka Zukan; lit. 'Illustrated Guide to Various Flowers', with hyakka sharing the kanji characters of "Momoka") and photographed in Kamakura, Kanagawa Prefecture, was released by Bis publisher Kobunsha on December 11, 2025. She also furthered her rakugo training under rakugoka Koasa Shunpūtei (春風亭小朝), who gave her the stage name (高座名, kōzamei) Kokoko Harukaze II, (Note: 二代目春風コココ, Nidaime Harukaze Kokoko; "Harukaze" shares the kanji characters of "Shunpū") making her the successor of former AKB48 member Mako Kojima, the original Kokoko Harukaze.

Itō debuted in the main lineup (選抜, senbatsu) of an AKB48 title track for 2025's "Masaka no Confession", and was promoted to full member on December 4. She has since become the original center (lead performer) for 2026's "Nagorizakura" and "Suki-ish" and the upcoming 2027 69th single, making her the first member to center three singles in a row in 16 years, after former founding member Atsuko Maeda. She, Airi Satō, and Azuki Yagi have been called the "ace trio" and "new era leaders" of AKB48 and are together referred to as the Seigekka (星月花; lit. 'star, moon, flower'), after the last kanji characters of their names. Real Sound named her one of the faces that "symbolized" AKB48 in its 21st year.

In October 2026, Itō participated in the All-Star Thanksgiving Festival '26 Autumn game show on TBS. She took part in a quiz segment; placed second in the Heartbreak Hill 200 m challenge, after hurdler Hitomi Nakajima; and placed third in the show's signature event, the Akasaka 5-chome mini-marathon, behind Mako Sakashita of NMB48 and Nonoka Kazami of Shiritsu Ebisu Chugaku.

== Discography ==
Itō's notable contributions to AKB48's discography include:

- "Masaka no Confession" (2026), main lineup debut
- "Nagorizakura" (2026), center (lead perfomer)
- "Suki-ish" (2026), center
- AKB48's upcoming 69th single (2027, title TBA), center

== Filmography ==
=== Television ===
Itō's television appearances
| Year | Title | Role | Notes | Ref. |
|---|---|---|---|---|
| 2024 | Stardust Telepath | Yū Akeuchi | | |
| 2026 | All-Star Thanksgiving Festival '26 Autumn | Contestant (as herself) | | |
