= Azuki Yagi =

- 八木 愛月
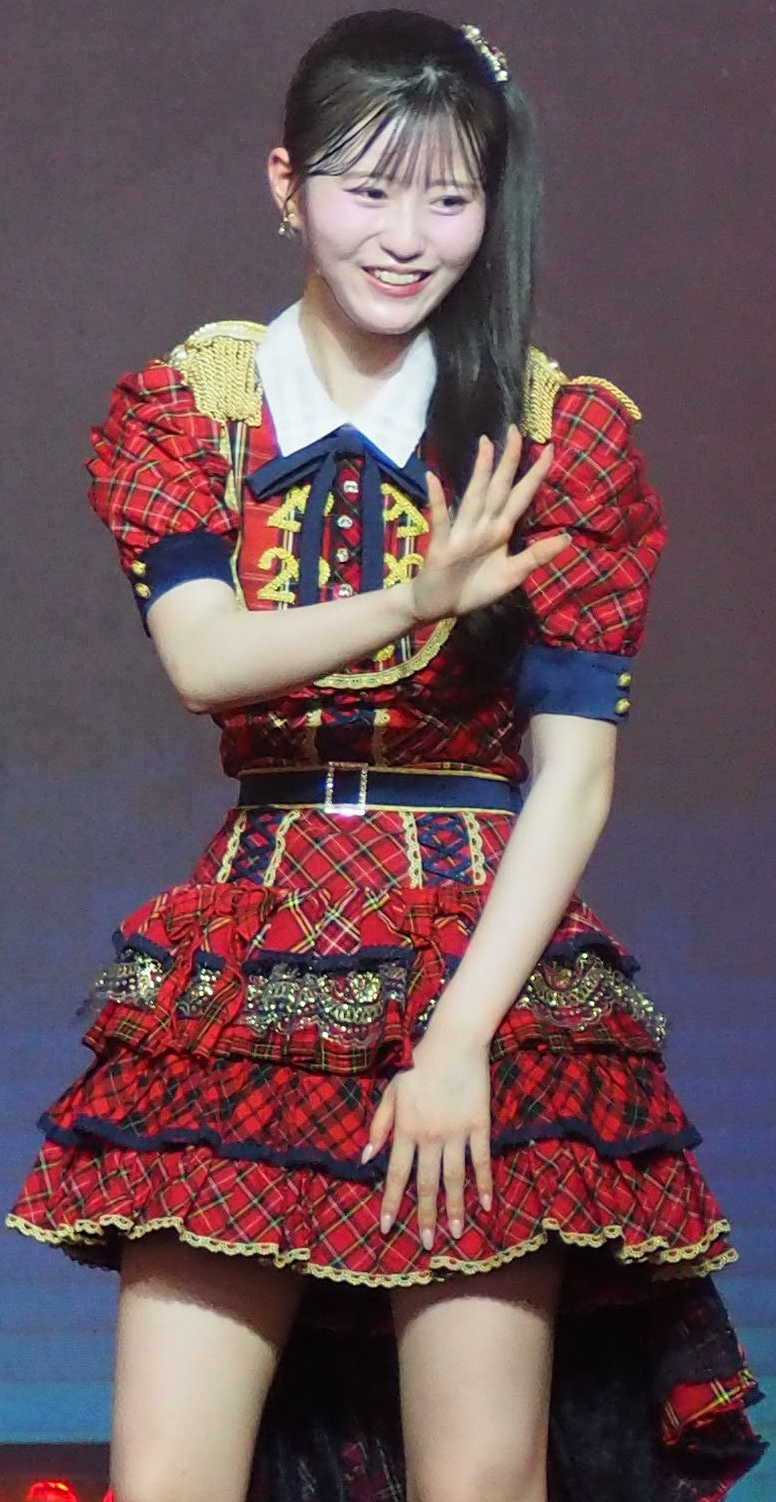
- Yagi in 2026
- Born: March 22, 2005 (age 21); Tokyo, Japan
- Occupations: Singer; actress
- Years active: 2023–present
- Musical career
- Genre: J-pop
- Instrument: Vocals
- Member of: AKB48
- Website: Official website

Azuki Yagi (Japanese: 八木 愛月, Hepburn: Yagi Azuki; born March 22, 2005) is a Japanese singer. She is a member of girl group AKB48 and has been the lead performer for the single "Masaka no Confession" (2024).

Yagi's parents have both been AKB48 fans, with her father being a Mariko Shinoda fan and her mother, and herself, of Yuko Oshima. She joined the group as an 18th-generation trainee in 2023. She was announced as the center (lead performer) for AKB48's 65th single "Masaka no Confession" on January 6, 2025, making her the first ever AKB48 trainee to become the center for a single, and was promoted to full member together with the rest of the 18th generation on its release day on April 2. She, Airi Satō, and Momoka Itō have been called the "ace trio" and "new era leaders" of AKB48 and are together referred to as the Seigekka (星月花; lit. 'star, moon, flower'), after the last kanji characters of their names.
