= Natalie Hoover =

American voice actress

Natalie Rose Hoover
- Other name: Natalie Rose
- Occupation: Voice Actors / Vocalist / Voice Director / Casting Director
- Website: www.nataliehoover.com

Natalie Hoover is an American voice actress based in Los Angeles and Dallas. She has done voicework for anime, video games, and other audio productions. Some of her most notable roles include Sonia Nevermind and Monophanie in the Danganronpa franchise, Titan from Takt Op; Destiny, Reina Izumi in Myriad Colors Phantom World, Vanilla from Nekopara and Mashiro Arisaka in Aokana: Four Rhythm Across the Blue.

== Career ==
In 2010, Hoover was deemed as the Japanator New York Anime Festival and Comic Con voice acting contest winner. In 2012, she was chosen to voice Lady S in the short film Kick-Heart by the creator and director of the film Masaaki Yuasa himself.

In anime, Hoover is known as the voice of Nana Sakurai from Prince of Stride: Alternative, Jintsū from Kancolle Tomoyo in Cardcaptor Sakura: Clear Card, and Georgette Lemare from Brave Witches. In video games, she is known for her performances as Sonia Nevermind from Danganronpa 2, Jintsū from Kancolle: Kantai Collection, Ryubence from The Witch and the Hundred Knight, Tiara from Fairy Fencer F, Adelheid from Lord of Magna: Maiden Heaven, Monophanie from Danganronpa V3: Killing Harmony, and Ayn Felice from Tales of Zestiria and its anime adaptation.

In her spare time, she releases her covers of various anison songs on SoundCloud.

== Filmography ==
=== Anime ===
Year	Title	Role	Notes	Source
2013	Sword Art Online	Yolko		
2014	Magi: The Labyrinth of Magic	Toya	season 2	
2015	Noragami	Mineha	season 2	
2015	Show by Rock	Tsukino	also season 2 and shorts	
2015	Riddle Story of Devil	Hitsugi Kirigaya		
2016	Aokana: Four Rhythm Across The Blue	Mashiro Arisaka		
2016	Prince of Stride: Alternative	Nana Sakurai		
2016	Danganronpa 3: The End of Hope's Peak High School	Sonia Nevermind		
2016	One Piece	Catarina Devon	Funimation dub	
2016	Keijo!!!!!!!!	Usagi Tsukishita		
2017	Hand Shakers	Lily Hojo		
2017	Akiba's Trip the Animation	Arisa Ahokainen		
2017	Brave Witches	Georgette Lemare		
2017	Sakura Quest	Ayana Nakatsugawa		
2017	Kancolle: Kantai Collection	Jintsū		
2017	Rio: Rainbow Gate	Anya Helsing		
2017	Masamune's Revenge	Kinue Hayase		
2017	Luck and Logic	Nemesis		
2017	Tales of Zestiria the X	Ayn Felice		
2017	New Game!	Yamada		
2017	Chronos Ruler	Koyuki	Assistant director (eps. 3–4)	
2017	In Another World with My Smartphone	Aer		
2017	Myriad Colors Phantom World	Reina Izumi		
2017	Hundred	Erica Candle		
2017	King's Game The Animation	Chia Kawano		
2017	Garo: Vanishing Line	Mia		
2017	Anime-Gataris	Ai Asagaya		
2018	Dances with the Dragons	Curaso Opt Koga		
2018	Kakuriyo: Bed and Breakfast for Spirits	Shizuna		
2018	Overlord III	Leinas Rockbruise		
2018	Cardcaptor Sakura: Clear Card	Tomoyo Daidouji		
2018	Citrus	Kayo Maruta		
2018	A Certain Magical Index III	Oyafune Suama		
2018	Double Decker! Doug & Kirill	Katherine "Kay" Roshfall		
2018	RErideD: Derrida, who leaps through time	Yuri Dietrich		
2018	Conception	Arie		
2018–2021	That Time I Got Reincarnated as a Slime	Eren	8 episodes	
2019	Boogiepop and Others	Kazuko Suema	9 episodes	
2019	How Heavy Are the Dumbbells You Lift?	Yakusha Kure		
2019–2021	Fruits Basket	Minami Kinoshita	2019 reboot	
2019–present	Demon Lord, Retry!	Aku		
2020	If My Favorite Pop Idol Made It to the Budokan, I Would Die	Yumeri Mizumori		
2020	Nekopara	Vanilla		
2020	Asteroid in Love	Mari Morino		
2020	Bofuri	Syrup	ADR director	
2020	By the Grace of the Gods	Lilian		
2020	The Day I Became a God	Hikari Jingūji		
2021	Tonikawa: Over the Moon For You	Charlotte		
2021	Bottom-tier Character Tomozaki	Fūka Kikuchi		
2021	Back Arrow	Atlee Ariel		
2021	The Quintessential Quintuplets ∬	Tsubaki		
2021	The Saint's Magic Power is Omnipotent	Aira Misono		
2021	Ishida & Asakura	Satou		
2022	Girls' Frontline	PPSH42		
2022	Love Live! Superstar!!	Yae		
2022	The Great Jahy Will Not Be Defeated!	Boss		
2022	Lucifer and the Biscuit Hammer	Yayoi Hakudou		
2022	Kakegurui Twin	Tsuzura Hanatemari	Netflix dub	
2022	Natsume's Book of Friends	Asagi		
2022	PuraOre! Pride of Orange		Assistant ADR Director	
2022–2025	My Dress-Up Darling	Rune	8 episodes	
2023	The Aristocrat's Otherworldly Adventure: Serving Gods Who Go Too Far	Sylvia	9 episodes	
2023	Shy	Spirit		
2026	Welcome to Demon School! Iruma-kun	Ix Elizabetta	2 episodes	

=== Film ===
Year	Title	Role	Notes	Source
2013	Kick-Heart	Lady S	short film, presented on Cartoon Network	
2014	Giovanni's Island	Tanya		

=== Video games ===
Year	Title	Role	Notes	Source
2014	Danganronpa 2: Goodbye Despair	Sonia Nevermind		
2014	The Witch and the Hundred Knight	Ryubence		
2014	Fairy Fencer F	Tiara		
2015	Hyperdevotion Noire: Goddess Black Heart	Little Rain		
2015	Lord of Magna: Maiden Heaven	Adelheid		
2015	Tales of Zestiria	Ayn Felice		
2015	Love Nikki-Dress UP Queen	Nikki		
2016	Paladins (video game)	Ash		
2017	Danganronpa V3: Killing Harmony	Monophanie		
2019	Love Esquire	Giselle		
2022	Gunvolt Chronicles: Luminous Avenger iX 2	Null		
2022	Pixel Happy Game Girls	Ami Suzuki		
2022	Path to Nowhere	Ninety-Nine, Lynn, Victoria		
2024	Card-en-Ciel	Fee Sireness, Sakura, Renge Munakata, Null		
2026	Danganronpa 2×2	Sonia Nevermind		
2026	Fire Emblem: Fortune's Weave	Alexandra Tamsanqa		
