= List of Strike Witches episodes =

Strike Witches Japanese DVD volume 1 cover

Strike Witches is an anime series released as part of a mixed media project by Fumikane Shimada, which also includes light novels and manga. Taking place in an alternate Earth in the 1940s, the series focuses on the 501st Joint Fighter Wing of Strike Witches, magically powered girls who fight against an alien race known as the Neuroi. An original video animation was produced by Gonzo and directed by Kunihisa Sugishima and released in Japan in January 2007. The first season of the anime television series was directed by Kazuhiro Takamura and also produced by Gonzo aired from July to September 2008. The series was also streamed with English subtitles on YouTube, BOST TV and Crunchyroll. The uncensored DVDs were released in September 2008 and January 2009. The series was licensed by Funimation and was released in a complete box set in North America in March 2010. The second season, titled Strike Witches 2, was produced by AIC and again directed by Takamura. It was broadcast in Japan from July to September 2010. It was also simulcast on Crunchyroll and Funimation's anime portal. This series was also licensed by Funimation and released on Blu-ray Disc and DVD in North America in October 2012. A film adaptation was released in March 2012. An original video animation series produced by Silver Link, Operation Victory Arrow, began release in September 2014. A third season of the Strike Witches series, titled Strike Witches: Road to Berlin, aired from October to December 2020.

Four pieces of theme music were used for the series. The opening theme for the first series is titled "Strike Witches: To Do What I Can" (ストライクウィッチーズ ～わたしにできること～, Sutoraiku Witchīzu ~Watashi ni Dekiru Koto~) and performed by Yoko Ishida, while the ending theme is "Bookmark Ahead" (ブックマーク ア・ヘッド, Bukkumāku A Heddo), performed by members of the vocal cast. The second series' opening theme is "STRIKE WITCHES 2 - The Magic of Smile (STRIKE WITCHES 2 ～笑顔の魔法～, Sutoraiku Witchīzu Tsū ~Egao no Mahou~) performed by Ishida, while the ending theme is "Over Sky" which is performed by the vocal cast. For the OVA series, the opening theme is "Connect Link" performed once again by Ishida, while the ending theme is "Fly away" performed by the vocal cast. For the third season, the opening theme is "Wings of Courage" (勇気の翼, Yuuki no Tsubasa) by Ishida while the ending theme is "Yearning For Your Wings" (君の翼に憧れて, Kimi no Tsubasa ni Akogarete) performed by the vocal cast.

== Series overview ==
=== Strike Witches ===
Season	Episodes	Originally released	
Season	Episodes	First released	Last released
1	12	July 3, 2008	September 18, 2008
2	12	July 8, 2010	September 23, 2010
3	12	October 7, 2020	December 23, 2020

=== Spin-Offs ===
Season	Episodes	Originally released	
Season	Episodes	First released	Last released
1	12	April 9, 2019	June 25, 2019
2	12	January 13, 2021	March 31, 2021
3	12	July 3, 2022	September 25, 2022

== Television series ==
=== Strike Witches (2008) ===
No.	Title	Original release date
1	"Magical Girl"; Transliteration: "Mahō Shōjo" (Japanese: 魔法少女)	July 3, 2008
In Fuso, Yoshika Miyafuji rescues a cat from a tree, which her friend Michiko Yamakawa admires her for doing so. That afternoon, while Yoshika hitches a ride with Michiko's grandfather, a dog suddenly appears and crashes the wagon, and Michiko ends up injured. Once it is shown that Yoshika has magic healing abilities, she is approached by Mio Sakamoto to become a member of the special aerial infantry that is fighting against the mysterious Neuroi. Yoshika initially refuses her offer, until she receives a letter that supposedly came from her father, Ichiro Miyafuji. Yoshika accompanies Mio on the aircraft carrier Akagi, which soon comes under a surprise attack by the Neuroi.
2	"That Which I Can Do"; Transliteration: "Watashi ni Dekiru Koto" (Japanese: 私にできること)	July 10, 2008
With reinforcements a long way away, Mio along with the ship's air forces fight against the Neuroi ship. Frustrated that she cannot do more to help, Yoshika decides to don a Striker Unit, a device used to make witches fly, to assist Mio. Although hesitant in using a gun, she manages to do enough to allow the reinforcements to obliterate the Neuroi. Later, after finding that her father has died, Yoshika joins the Strike Witches so she can help people.
3	"You're Not Alone"; Transliteration: "Hitori Ja Nai kara" (Japanese: 一人じゃないから)	July 17, 2008
In Brittania, Yoshika is introduced to the other members of the 501st Joint Fighter Wing. The former newest Witch, Lynette Bishop, is distressed that Yoshika's apparent talent surpasses her own, since she has no confidence during battle. When a decoy leaves Yoshika and Lynette as the only defense against a Neuroi attack, Yoshika helps to stabilize Lynette so she can personally destroy the Neuroi.
4	"Thanks"; Transliteration: "Arigatō" (Japanese: ありがとう)	July 24, 2008
Luftwaffe ace Gertrud Barkhorn is indifferent towards Yoshika because she resembles her younger sister Christiane Barkhorn, who was seriously injured during the Neuroi invasion of Karlsland years earlier. Yoshika is also lectured by Perrine H. Clostermann out of jealousy of her familiarity with Mio. When a Neuroi threatens Karlsland again, Barkhorn attacks it alone over Mio's protestations. In the chaos, Barkhorn is critically wounded and is healed by Yoshika, who tells her why she joined the infantry. Reinvigorated, Barkhorn destroys the Neuroi and Minna lectures her for her recklessness. Later, Barkhorn decides to visit Chris.
5	"Fast, Big, Soft"; Transliteration: "Hayai, Okkii, Yawarakai" (Japanese: はやい, おっきい, やわらかい)	July 31, 2008
The Witches head to the Britannian coast for a mix of training and relaxation while Charlotte E. Yeager tunes up her Striker Unit, chasing her dream to break the sound barrier with it. While messing around, Charlotte's friend Francesca Lucchini accidentally damages Charlotte's Striker Unit and hastily puts it back together. When Charlotte uses this unit during a surprise Neuroi attack, she is able to break past Mach 1 and destroy the enemy by running right into it.
6	"We're the Same"; Transliteration: "Issho da yo" (Japanese: いっしょだよ)	August 7, 2008
When a suspicious new Neuroi is spotted in the clouds, Yoshika is assigned on night patrol with Sanya V. Litvyak and Eila Ilmatar Juutilainen to investigate. During one of their missions, the Neuroi appears again, targeting Sanya, but the three work together to destroy it. As Yoshika and Sanya share the same birthday, they hear Sanya's father play a song for her over the radio.
7	"Nice and Breezy"; Transliteration: "Sūsū suru no" (Japanese: スースーするの)	August 14, 2008
On the day of her commendation, Erica Hartmann misplaces her panties, so she steals Lucchini's. After taking a bath with the other Witches, Lucchini in turn takes Perrine's panties, but soon gets spotted by the others and runs away, taking Yoshika's underwear with her. As Lucchini continues her escape, she also takes Eila's tights, which causes Eila to borrow Sanya's. While hiding, Lucchini inadvertently triggers the Neuroi alarm, which causes confusion among the troops until Erica finds her. As Lucchini is forced to stand and watch without wearing panties during Erica's ceremony, a breezy wind reveals to everyone's shock to who the true culprit is.
8	"I Won't Forget You"; Transliteration: "Kimi o Wasurenai" (Japanese: 君を忘れない)	August 21, 2008
Yoshika finds it odd that Commander Minna-Dietlinde Wilcke has forbidden the men from the hangar from talking to Strike Witches. The Akagi comes to visit to thank Yoshika for her help during the Neuroi attack. One of the crew tries to give Yoshika a thank you letter but is stopped by Minna. The next day, the witches go up against a dividing Neuroi, and Minna notices a weakness in Mio's shield. Following the battle, Minna checks the site, where she finds a memento from her old friend who died in the war. As the Akagi leave on their next mission, Yoshika sends them off and Minna sings them a farewell song. However, later that night, Minna points a gun at Mio.
9	"What I Want to Protect"; Transliteration: "Mamoritai Mono" (Japanese: 守りたいもの)	August 26, 2008
Worried about Mio's strength, Minna cannot convince her to stop going into battles. After Barkhorn visits Chris, she finds a letter addressed to Minna, warning her not to delve in any further. Meanwhile, Perrine's jealousy over Yoshika reaches its peak and she challenges her to an aerial duel, which is soon interrupted by work of a Neuroi. When Yoshika confronts the Neuroi, it turns into a human shape and appears to communicate with her. When Mio arrives, Yoshika tries to defend it but Mio attacks regardless. The Neuroi pierces through Mio's shield, dealing critical damage.
10	"I Want You To Believe"; Transliteration: "Shinjite Hoshii" (Japanese: 信じてほしい)	September 4, 2008
Despite using up all her energy and passing out, Yoshika continues using her healing abilities on Mio, eventually getting her into a stable condition. Minna, oblivious to Yoshika's statements about the Neuroi, confines her to her quarters. Determined to discover the truth, Yoshika secretly follows the Neuroi to its hive. There, Yoshika is shown the history of the Neuroi, as well as some scientists utilizing one of the Neuroi cores. Before Yoshika can learn more, a strange mech utilizing similar technology appears and destroys the Neuroi. Upon returning to base, the Witches find themselves surrounded by a group of military soldiers.
11	"Into the Sky..."; Transliteration: "Sora e..." (Japanese: 空へ...)	September 11, 2008
The military, led by General Trevor Maloney, mutinies and orders the dissolution of the Strike Witches. They decide to use their mech, the Warlock, which Yoshika recognizes from the visions the Neuroi showed her. The Witches go their separate ways and return to their home countries. However, Minna, Barkhorn, and Erica decide to stay behind to learn about Maloney's plans. When the Warlock attacks a Neuroi nest, it turns on Maloney, attacking everything in sight. With Yoshika, Mio, and Perrine aboard the Akagi as it is attacked, Mio reveals a hidden Striker Unit which Yoshika offers to fly.
12	"Strike Witches"; Transliteration: "Sutoraiku Wicchīzu" (Japanese: ストライクウィッチーズ)	September 18, 2008
Yoshika, refusing to lose, flies off to fight the Warlock. After Minna's group captures Maloney, they use Barkhorn's strength to retrieve everyone's Striker Units so they can assist Yoshika in taking down the Warlock. However, it assimilates with the Akagi, transforming it into a giant airship. While everyone else provides cover, Yoshika, Lynne, and Perrine infiltrate the ship, and use Yoshika's Striker Unit to destroy the core. With the Warlock defeated, the Neuroi nest over Gallia disappears, and the 501st Joint Fighter Wing goes their separate ways for the next six months.

=== Strike Witches 2 (2010) ===
No.	Title	Original release date
1	"Into the Sky Once More"; Transliteration: "Futatabi Sora e" (Japanese: 再び空へ)	July 8, 2010
Six months after the battle over Brittania, the 504th Joint Fighter Wing, while on a mission to make contact with the Neuroi, encounter an even larger Neuroi nest hovering over Venezia which obliterates the previous Neuroi and attacks relentlessly. Meanwhile, Yoshika, who had just graduated from middle school, receives a letter from Amaki Suwa, containing blueprints supposedly sent by her father. When Yoshika goes to deliver these to Mio, she gets word that the stronger Neuroi had overpowered the Strike Witches, aware that they are in danger. However, due to Yoshika's past actions that caused Mio's injuries, she orders Yoshika to go home. When Yoshika notices Mio heading into battle again, she takes her old Striker Unit and follows after her. Admiring her spirit, Mio allows Yoshika to accompany her. However, a week into their flight, their plane comes into contact with a Neuroi ship.
2	"The Legendary Witches"; Transliteration: "Densetsu no Majotachi" (Japanese: 伝説の魔女達)	July 15, 2010
As the Neuroi continues to attack the plane, a fleet of battleships provide support, but are easily defeated by the Neuroi. With Mio still unable to use her shield, Yoshika flies into battle to protect the ships with her enhanced magic. Mio then uses her enhanced katana, the Reppumaru, to slice through the Neuroi's beam and destroy it with a move called Reppuzan. However, it soon reforms itself, its core continuously shifting places to avoid being destroyed. Yoshika has a tough time facing it until the Witches arrive to assist, giving Mio the opportunity to destroy it with her Reppumaru. Setting up base in Romagna, Minna officially reforms the 501st Joint Fighter Wing.
3	"That Which We Can Do"; Transliteration: "Issho ni Dekiru Koto" (Japanese: 一緒にできること)	July 22, 2010
Mio meets up with Junko Takei of the 504th Joint Fighter Wing to learn about the new breed of Neuroi. Having gotten out of shape following inactivity during the past six months, Yoshika, Lynette, and Perrine are all sent to an elderly lady named Anna Ferrara, who teaches them the basics, namely how to ride brooms. They struggle at first, but they soon start to get the hang of it. During their training, a Neuroi ship threatens to come into contact with Anna's home, but the girls team up to defeat it.
4	"Hard, Fast, Amazing!"; Transliteration: "Katai, Hayai, Monosugōi" (Japanese: かたい、はやい、ものすご～い)	July 29, 2010
The Witches obtain a prototype Jet Striker model from Karlsland. After an argument between Charlotte and Barkhorn, the latter gets to test it out, while the former is convinced by Lucchini not to use it after trying it out herself. Barkhorn relishes the Jet Striker's power and outperforms Charlotte in a series of performance tests, but it ends up draining too much of her magic, causing her to faint mid-flight. Forbidding anyone from using the Striker as a result, Minna confines Barkhorn to her quarters for her own safety. She breaks the ban anyway when a fast Neuroi appears. Although she defeats the Neuroi, Barkhorn faints as, this time, the Jet Striker goes out of control, forcing Charlotte to push her Striker Unit to its limits to save her, destroying the prototype in the process. Later, Ursula Hartmann, Erica's twin sister and a Striker engineer, sends a shipment of potatoes as a token of apology for the flawed prototype.
5	"My Romagna"; Transliteration: "Watashi no Romānya" (Japanese: 私のロマーニャ)	August 5, 2010
While Yoshika, Charlotte, and Lucchini are in Roma, which is Romagna's capital, buying supplies and gifts, Lucchini spots a girl named Maria being accosted by some suited men and rescues her. The two quickly become friends and spend the day exploring the city, although Lucchini ends up spending all the food money Charlotte gave her. When a Neuroi ship appears, Lucchini rejoins Yoshika and Charlotte to defeat it. Afterward, Lucchini treats Maria to a bird's eye view of Roma, telling her the importance of protecting it. After they return home, it is revealed that Maria is actually the Duchess of the Principality of Romagna, who gives her thanks to Lucchini during her inauguration by airdropping food supplies to the Witches.
6	"Higher than the Sky"; Transliteration: "Sora yori Takaku" (Japanese: 空より高く)	August 12, 2010
The Witches discover a huge Neuroi spire whose core is in a location far beyond the altitude that their Striker Units can reach. Formulating a plan using rocket boosters in stages to reach the required altitude, Sanya is chosen to attack the core. Having never needed to use a shield in combat, Eila becomes furious when Yoshika is chosen to protect Sanya instead of her. As Eila unsuccessfully tries to get Perrine to train her to use shields, Sanya becomes annoyed with Eila's willingness to give up and gets into a fight with her. The next day, as the Witches launch Sanya and Yoshika to the stratosphere, Eila apologizes and expresses her desire to protect Sanya. Seeing this, Yoshika decides to switch places with Eila, who finally uses her shield to protect Sanya as she destroys the core.
7	"It's All Creepy Crawly"; Transliteration: "Mozomozo Suru no" (Japanese: モゾモゾするの)	August 19, 2010
After enjoying the newly-installed bath, a strange bug that Lucchini found earlier in the morning is embarrassing the Witches by literally getting into their panties, as well as causing electrical outages around the base. They soon realize that the bug is a Neuroi core that is sapping electricity from the base, disabling the alarm system, as it feeds it to a larger Neuroi above the base. After the Witches ensue a lengthy chase for the bug around the base, Minna unconventionally destroys the Neuroi bug when it crawls inside her panties, destroying the larger unit as well. As it is technically Minna's 200th Neuroi kill, she is awarded a medal by the Luftwaffe for the milestone.
8	"Please Grant Me Wings"; Transliteration: "Tsubasa wo Kudasai" (Japanese: 翼をください)	August 26, 2010
Mio trains to perform a True Reppuzan, refusing to teach it to Yoshika despite her requests. Later, during a practice session with Perrine, Yoshika starts to have some trouble flying. However, Yoshika is given a clean bill of health, and her Striker Unit is in perfect running condition. The next day, Yoshika and Lynnette are sent to the battleship Yamato to heal crew members injured in a lab explosion. When the Yamato and its battle group is attacked by a blimp-shaped Neuroi ship, Yoshika is unable to fly, leaving Lynette alone to defend the battle fleet while they retreat. As Yoshika laments her inability to help, she hears her father's voice and is presented with a new Striker Unit, which was developed based on his research findings. Now able to use her powers to the maximum with a Striker Unit built just for her, Yoshika flies off to save Lynette and destroy the Neuroi unassisted. Later, it is discovered that Yoshika's flight troubles are traced to her old Striker Unit's inability to withstand Yoshika's increasing power.
9	"The Bridge to Tomorrow"; Transliteration: "Asu ni Kakeru Hashi" (Japanese: 明日に架ける橋)	September 2, 2010
While visiting Gallia, Perrine learns that children cannot get to school because the bridge is broken. This preoccupies her, as she even thinking of selling the last family heirloom to fund the bridge's repairs. On a training trip at the beach, Lucchini finds a treasure chest, which Perrine salvages in the hope of finding treasure. After going through an endless number of chests, they find a puzzle chest containing a map, which Perrine, Yoshika, Lynnette, and Lucchini follow to a booby-trapped underwater cave. Meanwhile, while looking for them, Mio and the others encounter a trap which causes Mio to become drunk, kissing Minna and running off. Perrine's group soon comes across a room with a statue, which Perrine defeats when it attacks them. They eventually find the treasure, which is nothing more than a herb and spice garden. However, a slightly hungover Mio reassures Perrine that it is the feelings that people truly treasure. After returning to base, Perrine receives a letter from Gallia informing her that the children worked together to build a new bridge.
10	"500 Overs"	September 9, 2010
Mio progresses in perfecting the True Reppuzan, but it drains much power from her. After Minna proposes an operation to attack a Neuroi base, the top brass send in Captain Hanna-Justina Marseille of the 31st Karlsland Luftwaffe Storm Witches to join the mission. Since Barkhorn and Hanna do not get along, Erica volunteers to accompany her on the mission. After fooling around in a training session, Erica and Hanna are ordered to stay in a room together to learn to cooperate. Obsessed with winning, Hanna has always wanted to settle things with Erica, whom she views as her equal, but as of late she is annoyed with Erica's lack of competitive spirit. When Hanna badmouths Barkhorn, who wants an autograph for her sister, Erica agrees to compete with her during the mission. When they reached a draw after destroying the Neuroi, they have a tiebreaker dogfight, also ending in a draw. Before she leaves, Hanna decides to give the autograph.
11	"To Be Myself"; Transliteration: "Watashi de Aru Tame Ni" (Japanese: 私であるために)	September 16, 2010
Mio still experiences power drains from her use of the True Reppuzan. Later, Yoshika discovers that the Reppumaru reacts to her powers and nearly causes her to faint when she could not let go of it, much to Mio's angry reprimand. Later, Mio and Minna receive orders from their superiors for a final attack on the Neuroi nest. They plan to defeat it by powering the Yamato with Neuroi technology. The mission's failure would mean the surrender of Romagna and the dissolution of the 501st Strike Witches. Mio becomes determined to complete the True Reppuzan, but Minna, aware that her sword has drained nearly all of her magical power, stops her, all of which Yoshika overhears. The next day, they begin the charge and Mio, to her dismay, is unable to execute the True Reppuzan. Meanwhile, the Yamato activates its Neuroi Dynamo, allowing it to fly and repair itself. But when the Yamato hits the hive bow first, its Neuroi Dynamo stopped working, paralyzing its firing controls. With the mission deemed a failure, Mio, refusing to lose, charges towards the Yamato to attempt to restart the Neuroi Dynamo with her remaining magic power.
12	"Beyond the Eternal Skies"; Transliteration: "Sora Yori Towa Ni" (Japanese: 天空より永遠に)	September 23, 2010
Over Minna's objection, Mio heads inside the Yamato and gives the Neuroi Dynamo her remaining magic power which kick-starts the engine. Mio is then able to fire the main cannon, destroying the Neuroi nest. It is revealed, however, that the dome was merely a shield concealing the hive's massive core, which Mio becomes absorbed into. Refusing to surrender, Yoshika, with backup from the other Witches, retrieves the Reppumaru and is able to perform the True Reppuzan which only Fuso Witches are capable of performing. This destroys the giant Neuroi core at the cost of Yoshika's remaining magical power, releasing Mio in the process. With Venezia finally free from the Neuroi, the 501st Strike Witches once again go their separate ways, and Yoshika begins her medical career. In the final scene, a stranger appears to discover Yoshika's special Striker Unit, having washed up on a beach alongside the Reppumaru.

=== Strike Witches: 501st Joint Fighter Wing Take Off! (2019) ===
No.	Title	Original release date
1	"501st, Take Off!"; Transliteration: "501 Hasshin Shimasu?" (Japanese: 501発進します？)	April 9, 2019
2	"501st, Clean Your Dirty Rooms?"; Transliteration: "501 Obeya Souji Shimasu?" (Japanese: 501汚部屋掃除します？)	April 16, 2019
3	"501st, Head Out To Shop?"; Transliteration: "501 Kaidashi ni Dekakemasu?" (Japanese: 501買い出しに出かけます？)	April 23, 2019
4	"501st, It's Time For Halloween?"; Transliteration: "501 Harō~in Shimasu?" (Japanese: 501ハロウィンします？)	April 30, 2019
5	"501st, Time For A Haircut?"; Transliteration: "501 Sanpatsu Shimasu?" (Japanese: 501散髪します？)	May 7, 2019
6	"501st, Are You Feeling Stressed?"; Transliteration: "501 Sutoresu o Kanjimasu?" (Japanese: 501ストレスを感じます？)	May 14, 2019
7	"501st, Get Ready for Setsubun?"; Transliteration: "501 Setsubun Shimasu?" (Japanese: 501節分します？)	May 21, 2019
8	"501st, Get Ready for Night Work?"; Transliteration: "501 Yakankinmu Shimasu?" (Japanese: 501夜間勤務します？)	May 28, 2019
9	"501st, You Can't Fly Anymore?"; Transliteration: "501 Tobenaku Narimasu?" (Japanese: 501飛べなくなります？)	June 4, 2019
10	"501st, Are You Feeling the Heat?"; Transliteration: "501 Natsu, Kanjichaimasu?" (Japanese: 501夏, 感じちゃいます？)	June 11, 2019
11	"501st, Time to Save Lives?"; Transliteration: "501 Jinmeikyuujo Shimasu?" (Japanese: 501人命救助します？)	June 18, 2019
12	"501st, You're Splitting Up?"; Transliteration: "501 Kaisan Shimasu?" (Japanese: 501解散します？)	June 25, 2019

=== Strike Witches: Road to Berlin (2020) ===
No.	Title	Original release date
1	"The Magical Girl of the Alps"; Transliteration: "Arupusu no Mahō Shōjo" (Japanese: アルプスの魔法少女)	October 7, 2020
Mio pays a visit to Yoshika, who is studying in a medical school in Helvetia during her break from the 501st Unit. In the occasion, Yoshika uses her magic to rescue her friend Althea from an angry polar bear, revealing herself as a witch. Upon learning that both Mio and Yoshika are from the army, Althea asks for their help to make contact with her father, who is the captain of the Venzian battleship Doge, but when she manages to reach him, the communication is cut short as the ship is threatened by a massive iceberg. Fearing for the worse, Yoshika borrows a Striker Unit and departs to assist them. When Yoshika arrives to provide help, the iceberg reveals itself as a Neuroi and starts attacking her.
2	"The Strike Witches Come Together"; Transliteration: "Kessei Sutoraiku Witchīzu" (Japanese: 結成ストライクウィッチーズ)	October 14, 2020
Yoshika defends the battleship until her Striker Unit malfunctions and she is rescued by the crew. While her Unit is repaired, the Neuroi changes course, threatening the city of Antwerp. The Doge attacks the Neuroi and manages to draw its attention from the city time enough for Yoshika's Unit to be fixed and she returns to the battle, but just as she is about to destroy the enemy core, the unit stalls again and the Neuroi resumes its attack on the city, until the rest of 501st arrive to help by Mio's request. Once reunited, the Strike Witches destroy the Neuroi's core, but fail to stop the iceberg from ramming at Antwerp's port. After the battle, Minna informs Yoshika that the military is about to start Operation Southwind, a large scale counterattack against the Neuroi hive in Berlin, and declares the official reestablishment of the 501st Joint Fighter Wing with Shizuka joining the team as a pilot in Mio's place.
3	"What the Two of Us Can Do"; Transliteration: "Futari Nara Dekiru Koto" (Japanese: 二人ならできること)	October 21, 2020
With the port of Antwerp destroyed, Operation Southwind is postponed and the 501st transfer to their new base with Shizuka officially introduced as their newest member. During a training session, Yoshika's Striker Unit fails and upon examination, it is discovered that her magic output is unstable since she regained her powers. Shizuka becomes uneasy with Yoshika's situation and wants to help her, despite not knowing how. Soon after, Minna dispatches the 501th Unit to intercept two Neuroi, except for Yoshika and Shizuka. However, they learn that a third Neuroi passed by them undetected and to compensate for Yoshika's unstable magic and Shizuka's lack of experience, they fly together with the former carried by the latter. With Minna's help, the two destroy the third Neuroi, which also erases the two other enemies because they shared a single core. After the battle, Yoshika vows to restabilize her magic power as soon as possible so she can fight properly with the others again.
4	"Beyond Two Hundred Miles Per Hour"; Transliteration: "Nihyaku Mairu no Mukō" (Japanese: 200マイルの向こう)	October 28, 2020
After learning that her speed record was broken, Charlotte begins working on her speedbike, the Rapid in order to get her record back. Despite having surpassed the current record after some tries, Charlotte decides to push further and aim to reach 200 mph with her bike. Suddenly, a Neuroi launches an attack on the base and flees after bombing the hangar too fast for the other witches to pursue, and to keep up with its speed once it returns, the Liberion air force sends a new P-51H unit for Charlotte. Unbecknowist to her, Luccini attaches some propellers on the Rapid to make a surprise to her, but it makes her angry instead and the two have a fight. Some time later, the two make up and start working on the Rapid together. When the Neuroi returns for another bombing run, Luccini takes off using Charlotte's new unit, but it proves too difficult for her to control. Piloting the Rapid, Charlotte rushes to rescue Lucchini, but the bike is destroyed. Using her new unit, Charlotte chases after the Neuroi and destroys it. After the battle, Charlotte realizes that her bond with Lucchini is more important than breaking her record, while the remains of the Rapid are seen underwater, with the last speed recorded by its speedometer surpassing 200 mph.
5	"Queen of Nederland"; Transliteration: "Kwīn obu Nēderuranto" (Japanese: クィーン・オブ・ネーデルラント)	November 4, 2020
Yoshika still has not managed to stabilize her magic pressure and when Perrine is assigned to a diplomatic mission in Nederland, she takes Yoshika and Shizuka with her. Upon meeting the queen, they are tasked to help the blue tulips, which are the country symbol to bloom to bolster the country's morale, given that the last time they bloomed was 20 years ago by a witch's intervention. The three help the local farmers on their efforts but to no avail. When the greenhouse's boiler breaks, a spare boliler is installed which is powered by a Striker Unit fueled by Yoshika's magic in order to keep the greenhouse's temperature stabilized. Their efforts are threatened when a Neuroi appears and attacks the greenhouse, destroying all remaining tulips except for one. Perrine defeats the Neuroi with her lightning magic which also makes the tulip bloom much to their surprise, with Perrine learning that the witch who helped the flowers bloom in the past was no other than her grandmother. With the mission successfully completed and Yoshika's magic properly stabilized thanks to her efforts at the greenhouse, the three witches return to base.
6	"Hounds of Vengeance"; Transliteration: "Fukushū no Ryōken" (Japanese: 復讐の猟犬)	November 11, 2020
With the port of Antwerp destroyed, the 501st is assigned to a reconnaissance mission to scout another port to serve as the bridgehead for Operation Southwind. During the mission Barkhorn and Erica are attacked by a Neuroi with high maneuver capabilities and Erica is shot down. Unable to keep fighting, Barkhorn is forced to retreat without knowing of Erica's fate. Unaware that Erica survived, Barkhorn divides her time between staying at the sauna and exercising herself without eating at all. Charlotte joins a rescue mission with Yoshika and Shizuka but despite her extra speed, she is defeated and forced to retreat as well. With her radio broken, Erica creates a dummy body to deceive the Neuroi into believing she is dead and waits for rescue. With Charlotte's help, Barkhorn tunes up her Striker Unit and reveals that she was conditioning her body to keep up with the enemy's acceleration. Accompanined by Yoshika and Shizuka, Barkhorn confronts the Neuroi and defeats it single-handedly, but upon seeing the dummy body, she believes that Erica is dead and loses all will to fight, until Erica contacts her using a signal light, just when a second Neuroi appears. With Erica's help, Barkhorn defeats the second Neuroi and returns to base while carrying her on her back.
7	"They Go Boing-Boing"; Transliteration: "Poyon Poyon Suru no" (Japanese: ポヨンポヨンするの)	November 18, 2020
During a sortie, Yoshika's Striker Unit fails again and they learn that despite her magic pressure is stabilized, her magic power diminished, thus it takes longer to recharge. Lynette searches the forest for a medicine to heal her condition when she finds a clay pot and takes it back to base. Inside the pot, the witches discover a clay doll that takes control of Luccini while increasing her breast size. She then passes on the curse to the others with the intention of gathering enough witches for a fertility ritual. With all witches possessed except for Yoshika and Lynette, the cursed girls kidnap Yoshika intending to use her for the ritual and Lynette uses her anti-materiel rifle to destroy the doll, dispelling the curse and making all witches and their bodies return to normal.
8	"The Fog"; Transliteration: "Za・Foggu" (Japanese: ザ・フォッグ)	November 25, 2020
During a scouting mission, Eila and Sanya are attacked by a Neuroi amidst a deep fog and forced to retreat. Later at the base, Minna informs the team that the fog is surrounding the port of Kiel, which the allied forces need to capture as part of Operation Southwind and because of that, the air force will launch a saturation attack to destroy the enemy forces, which will severely damage the port and delay their plans to liberate Berlin, designating most of the 501st to escort the bombers. Barkhorn disapproves of the idea, as she and Minna will soon turn 20 years old and be forced to retire before realizing their ambition of liberating Berlin together. Hearing their conversation, Sanya comes with her own plan to destroy the Neuroi creating the fog so that the port can be captured unscatched. Accompanied by Eila, Yoshika and Shizuka, Sanya locates the Neuroi but Eila, sensing that she is in danger, shoots without warning, which forces them to fall back. With no time left, Sanya decides to leave Eila out of the operation and departs with the others for another attempt, until Eila realizes that there is a second Neuroi amidst the mist that Sanya can not detect and rushes to warn them. Just as Eila predicted, Sanya's team is attacked by two Neuroi until Eila arrives and helps Sanya to locate and destroy the Neuroi's core, dissipating the fog just in time for the rest of the 501st and their allies to suspend the saturation attack and capture the port without collateral damage.
9	"Mina's Sky"; Transliteration: "Mīna no Sora" (Japanese: ミーナの空)	December 2, 2020
Minna, Barkhorn and Erica arrive at Kiel for a meeting with General Patton, who is about to launch an attack of Wolf, the Neuroi Hive in Berlin. On the occasion, they meet Ursula and learn that the Hive attacked the Allied forces from a distance. Once learning that the Neuroi Hive is using rockets to attack from a distance with increasing precision, threatening the Allied base at Kiel, the 501st devise a countermeasure to intercept the rockets in mid air using the ME-163 Komet, a rocket-powered Striker Unit created by Ursula. Minna decides to pilot the unit herself, but after its first flight, she feels a little exhausted, and Barkhorn correctly deduces that her magic power started to diminish. Despite that, Minna makes an infiltration with Barkhorn, Ursula and Erica deep inside enemy territory to make preparations to intercept the Rocket Neuroi. Having predicted their movement, the Neuroi Hive prepares another launch earlier than expected and sends an Interceptor-Type Neuroi against the Karsland witches. While Barkhorn and Erica fight and defeat the Interceptor, Ursula completes preparations for launch and Minna successfully shoots down the Rocket Neuroi. The Neuroi Hive in response prepares additional rockets and Minna uses her remaining fuel to destroy them, determined to sacrifice herself to protect the base. However, she is rescued in the nick of time by Erica and Barkhorn, who extract her to safety.
10	"Shizuka, Come In!"; Transliteration: "Shizuka Ōtō Seyo" (Japanese: 静夏応答せよ)	December 9, 2020
The Allied Forces begin Operation Southwind to liberate Berlin from the Neuroi, which begins with a saturation bombing to disperse the Neuroi Hive's smoke, followed by a direct attack on the core by the 501st, protected by Yoshika's massive shield. When the core is exposed however, multiple wall-like Neuroi appear and defend it, forcing the allies to retreat. Shizuka is tasked to escort Yoshika back to base to conserve her magic power and when the two are ambushed by a bomber-type Neuroi, Shizuka stays behind, eventually locating its core and destroying it. Back at Kiel, the military prepare their next move, which also involves making use of Yoshika's magic power, but when a bomber Neuroi attacks the port, she is left behind to recover while the others fight back. Shizuka attempts to defeat the Neuroi the same way she did to the previous one, just to find that the core is not where she expected. The Neuroi prepares to crash at the port when Yoshika uses her shield to keep it in air, while the other witches find its core's real location and destroy it. After the battle, Yoshika loses consciousness and is rescued by the others, with Minna revealing that all her magic power was depleted.
11	"Road to Berlin"; Transliteration: "Rōdo tu Berurin" (Japanese: ロード・トゥ・ベルリン)	December 16, 2020
According to the doctors, Yoshika needs 10 days to recover her magic power, but the military refuses to delay their plans and launches another offensive using the Landkreuzer P. 1000 Ratte escorted by the 501st, who do not know that Yoshika joined the crew of the Ratte as a medic by her request. Covered by special armor to deflect Neuroi attacks, the Ratte destroys the wall-type Neuroi, but not without damage, with Yoshika tending to the wounded soldiers. However, the Neuroi core deploys a huge barrier surrounding it, covering the Ratte's retreat. By Yoshika's suggestion, the Ratte and its allies take refuge behind the Zoo Tower and after learning that Yoshika is also aboard the Ratte, the 501st makes a plan to bypass the barrier using some underground tunnels to rescue her.
12	"I Still Want to Protect"; Transliteration: "Sore de mo Watashi wa Mamoritai" (Japanese: それでも私は守りたい)	December 23, 2020
With her unit damaged, Shizuka is ordered to retreat while the other witches use the subway tunnels to infiltrate Berlin and rescue Yoshika and the others. While Shizuka meets Mio and Ursula aboard a B-17 bomber and inform them of the situation, the witches find a large Neuroi citadel underneath the city and attack it, forcing the Neuroi forces to focus on them and weakening the barrier around the city. Mio and Ursula formulate a plan to destroy the barrier by dropping a bomb that Shizuka, piloting Yoshika's Shinden, detonates in mid air to increase the damage, but it only creates a hole in the barrier. Before the hole closes, Shizuka disobeys orders and passes through it to protect Yoshika, but is gravely wounded. At the vision of Shizuka dying, Yoshika regains her magic power and heals her, piloting the Shinden to fight the Neuroi aboveground and dividing the enemy forces. The 501st take advantage of this to destroy the underground Neuroi, which dispels the barrier and rejoins Yoshika on the surface, where they destroy the Hive's core for good, liberating Berlin. After the battle, the members of the 501st help with the city's reconstruction before returning to duty to continue with their mission to liberate the rest of Europe from the Neuroi.

=== World Witches Take Off! (2021) ===
No.	Title (Note: All English titles are taken from Crunchyroll.)	Directed by (Note: Information is taken from the ending credits of each episode.)	Original release date (Note: Tokyo MX listed the series premiere at 24:45 on January 12, 2021, which is January 13 at 12:45 a.m.)
1	"Miyafuji, Are You Making a Movie?"; Transliteration: "Miyafuji, Eiga Satsuei Shichaimasu?" (Japanese: 宮藤、映画撮影しちゃいます？)	Fumio Itō	January 13, 2021
2	"Hikari, You're Taking a Test?"; Transliteration: "Hikari, Senbatsu Shiken Shichaimasu?" (Japanese: ひかり、選抜試験しちゃいます？)	Fumio Itō	January 20, 2021
3	"501st, You're Paying Them Back?"; Transliteration: "Gōmaruichi, Oreimairi Hajime Chaimasu?" (Japanese: 501、お礼参り始めちゃいます？)	Fumio Itō	January 27, 2021
4	"Introducing the 502nd?" Transliteration: "Gōmaruni, Shōkai Shichaimasu?" (Japanese: 502、紹介しちゃいます？)	Fumio Itō	February 3, 2021
5	"501st, You're Seeing Through the Lies?"; Transliteration: "Gōmaruichi, Uso Abai Chaimasu?" (Japanese: 501、嘘暴いちゃいます？)	Fumio Itō	February 10, 2021
6	"502nd, You're Joining the Team?"; Transliteration: "Gōmaruni, Nyūtai Shichaimasu?" (Japanese: 502、入隊しちゃいます？)	Fumio Itō	February 17, 2021
7	"501st, Your Feelings Are Different?"; Transliteration: "Gōmaruichi, Omoi Surechigatchaimasu?" (Japanese: 501、想いすれ違っちゃいます？)	Fumio Itō	February 24, 2021
8	"502nd, You're Going for a Cold Swim?"; Transliteration: "Gōmaruni, Kanchū Suiei Shichaimasu?" (Japanese: 502、寒中水泳しちゃいます？)	Fumio Itō	March 3, 2021
9	"501st, Plots Are in Motion?"; Transliteration: "Gōmaruichi, Inbō Ugokida Shichaimasu?" (Japanese: 501、陰謀動き出しちゃいます？)	Fumio Itō	March 10, 2021
10	"502nd, You're Running Your First Errand?"; Transliteration: "Gōmaruni, Hajimete no Otsukai Shichaimasu?" (Japanese: 502、はじめてのおつかいしちゃいます？)	Fumio Itō	March 17, 2021
11	"501st, You're Going Back to that Sky?" (Note: The title is written as 501、また、あの空へ行っちゃいます？ in the episode.); Transliteration: "Gōmaruichi, Mata, Ano Sora Itchaimasu?" (Japanese: 501、また、あの空行っちゃいます？)	Fumio Itō	March 24, 2021
12	"502nd, Sister Aces are Taking Off?"; Transliteration: "Gōmaruni, Shimai Ēsu Hasshin Shichaimasu?" (Japanese: 502、姉妹エース発進しちゃいます？)	Fumio Itō	March 31, 2021

=== Luminous Witches (2022) ===
No.	Title	Directed by	Written by	Storyboarded by	Original release date
1	"Wonderful World – Nice to Meet You –"; Transliteration: "Wandafuru Wārudo – Hajimemashite –" (Japanese: WONDERFUL WORLD – はじめまして –)	Shouji Saeki; Kana Shundō (Note: Assisted by Kōji Matsumura.)	Shouji Saeki	Shouji Saeki	July 3, 2022 (Note: Episodes 1 had advance premieres on February 25, 2022, and on June 19, 2022.)
Three years after the evacuation of Dunkirk, humanity's war against the Neuroi continues. Retired Witch Grace Maitland Steward unsuccessfully tries to petition to the military to support the creation of a musical unit to improve morale on the homefront, as she believes music has the power to save people. Meanwhile, young witches Virginia Robertson, Shibuya Inori, and Lyudmila Andreyevna Ruslanova end up encountering each other in London. Lyudmila tells them about her admiration of the former Witch ace Aira Paivikki Linnamaa, who has now become a singer. Excited, Virginia begins singing as well, revealing her Night Witch powers that enhance her voice. Grace happens to hear Virginia's singing and is inspired with a newfound resolve. The next day, various witches who are struggling in military training, including Lyudmila, see a flier advertising for Witches to join the "LNAF Band".
2	"Eternal Spiritual Home"; Transliteration: "Towa no Yosuga" (Japanese: 永久の寄す処)	Kōji Matsumura	Shouji Saeki	Shouji Saeki	July 10, 2022
It's revealed that Grace distributed the fliers to recruit for the League of Nations Air Force Music Band in hopes of finding Virginia and reforming the band. Several witches, including Inori and Lyudmila, apply to join. However, since all of the applicants are washouts discharged from their respective militaries, Aira is skeptical of their potential. With deliberations between Grace and Aira dragging into the night, everybody decides to have dinner together. Inori then remembers that Virginia likes to use her Night Witch powers to listen to the radio at night and suggests that they can contact her that way. Aira agrees to let the Witches use training Strikers for this purpose. However, they have difficulty finding Virginia, since she is asleep and can't hear them. However, Inori begins to sing, cueing the rest of the Witches to join in, which wakes Virginia but while she can receive radio signals, she cannot send any out. Fortunately, her Night Witch antenna begins to glow, which allows Inori to spot her. Inori asks Virginia to join the LNAF Band as well, to which Virginia accepts. The next day, Virginia bids farewell to her family as she heads off for training.
3	"Gentle Light"; Transliteration: "Yasashī Akari" (Japanese: 優しい灯り)	Akira Katō	Shouji Saeki	Kana Shundō	July 17, 2022
With Virginia off taking the entrance exam to become a Witch, Grace decides to begin training the rest of the band members on how to sing and dance. Grace, Aira, and Eleonore each take two students to coach. Grace takes Inori and Silvie, Aira takes Lyudmilla and Maria, and Eleonore takes Manaia and Joanna. In Aira's training sessions, Maria struggles to keep up due to her low energy. During a striker training flight, Maria tries to follow Aira's complex maneuvers and ends up falling unconscious, leading Aira to wonder if she is really suited to lead the band. Virginia then arrives, having completed her training and assigned to the band. Eleonore decides to hold a singing and dancing training session in the local village, where they attract the attention of the village children. When Aira heads to the village with Virginia and Lyudmilla, she sees how morale in the village has greatly improved and sings a song at the villagers' request accompanied by an impromptu airshow by the rest of the band, and she comes to see the value in the band. Returning to base, Aira apologizes to the band and promises to do a better job leading them. Meanwhile, the village children decide to nickname the band the "Luminous Witches".
4	"Let's Sing a Song"; Transliteration: "Uta o Utaou" (Japanese: 歌を歌おう)	Kana Shundō	Yū Mori (Note: A pseudonym of actress Haruka Kimura.)	Kana Shundō	July 24, 2022
Grace plans to use a concert to restart the village's recently discontinued Mayday Festival, so Aira splits up the band members into three different roles. Maria and Manaia will handle dance choreography, Joanna and Silvie will sew costumes, and Lyudmilla and Inori will compose music. Lyudmilla and Inori initially have trouble making a song together, but Virginia asks them who they want to send the song to, and what message they want to send with it. This gives them the inspiration to keep working. Next, the band works together with the villagers to build a new stage in the village square. The girls quickly progress in their areas of responsibility, with the song, dance choreography, and costumes being complete just in time. The first half of the concert goes as planned, but for their final act, rainwater shorts out their music equipment, so their new song fails to play. Fortunately, Virginia is able to use her Night Witch powers to replay the song, allowing the performance to continue. The show impresses Grace's sponsor, who agrees to petition the military to approve her World Tour, which will have the band travel around the globe to raise morale with their performances. The band then officially adopts the "Luminous Witches" name.
5	"Pure White Ribbon"; Transliteration: "Masshiro Ribon" (Japanese: まっしろリボン)	Michita Shiraishi	Rino Yamazaki	Yūji Tokuno; Shouji Saeki; Kana Shundō	July 31, 2022
Grace announces to the band that the LNAF has approved the World Tour, and their first stop will be at Rome in Romagna. Upon arrival, though, Silvie requests to Grace that she not appear on stage on any performance in Romagna, due to concerns of her father finding out. She further explains she is the only witch forcibly transferred into the band due to other squadrons not wanting to risk sending her into battle because of how influential her parents are. As the girls spread fliers around Rome, Silvie takes the opportunity to visit her mother's grave, where she reveals that she lied about her identity to her bandmates so that they won't shun her for being the daughter of royalty. She then has a brief reunion with her father before running off to avoid him. That night, Silvie is still conflicted over her purpose in the band, but a conversation with Joanna convinces her to be more honest with herself. She decides to participate in the performance, and then reveals to the band that she is actually Princess Silvana, a potential contender to be the next queen of Romagna. The rest of the band still accept Silvie as a comrade regardless of her social status, much to Silvie's relief. Meanwhile, Grace reads a newspaper article written by Silvie's father praising the Luminous Witches and their performance.
6	"Dream-colored Contrail"; Transliteration: "Yumeiro Kontoreiru" (Japanese: 夢色コントレイル)	Kōji Matsumura	Kana Shundō	Kana Shundō	August 7, 2022
After several more concerts across Europe, the band stops in Greece to rest and Maria begins planning a new aerial acrobatic choreography that will include the use of their magical shields. However, matters get heated when Maria insists they practice their moves on the ground first while the rest of the band suggests practicing in the air. This leads to an argument between Maria and Manaia. Privately, Maria is still afraid of flying due to her earlier training incident, and in a fit of despair she throws her acrobatic plans out a window. Outside, Manaia tries to teach Virginia how to change the size and color of her shield when she notices Maria's plans scattered around and recovers them. Bringing the plans back to base, Manaia praises Maria on how exciting the choreography is. However, Maria admits that she's conflicted about making the best performance possible while at the same time limiting the difficulty of the moves due to her own weakness in flight. Manaia then takes Maria out on a flight to replicate the moves she drafted, and working together they are able to master them. With renewed confidence, Maria revamps the flight choreography with more complex moves while Manaia teaches the other band members how to change the color of their shields.
7	"The Reason for the Sun"; Transliteration: "Taiyō no Riyū" (Japanese: 太陽の理由)	Akira Katō	Shouji Saeki	Shouji Saeki	August 21, 2022
The Luminous Witches head for their next stop in Chelyabinsk in Orussia, though they are skeptical if anybody will attend their concert since everybody is too busy building a new town for evacuees. Virginia notices her familiar Moffy appears to be ill and takes her to a local resident, Anna, for treatment. While there, she, Lyudmilla, and Inori learn that Anna's husband Volodya used to be a pianist and he would play a song for his daughter on her birthday. However, with the war, he lost his piano in an air raid and his daughter went off to fight on the frontlines as a Witch. Grace comes up with a solution to their concerns about attendance by turning their concert into a radio show, and Virginia and her friends ask Volodya to play a song for his daughter as well. However, on the day of the concert, a Neuroi appears and begins jamming communications. Virginia manages to spot it with her Night Witch powers and through force of will is able to transmit a message to the 503rd Joint Fighter Wing, who shoot it down. Volodya then begins playing his song, which reaches his daughter Sanya Litvyak.
8	"I Will Not Forget Those Days"; Transliteration: "Ano Hibi o Wasurenai" (Japanese: あの日々を忘れない)	Yukihiro Miyamoto	Rino Yamazaki	Shouji Saeki; Takashi Kawabata	August 28, 2022
The Luminous Witches arrive for their next performance at Tokyo in Fuso. However, during the airshow part of the concert, Lyudmilla loses concentration and accidentally speeds up, threatening to ruin the formation until Eleonore speeds up in response to cover for her mistake. While Aira doesn't hold anything against Lyudmilla, Lydumilla herself becomes jealous of how dependable Eleonore appears to be to Aira. The band is then brought to the home of Inori's grandmother, who has agreed to loan her estate to them for lodging. While performing the daily chores, Lyudmilla starts a one sided competition with Eleonore. When Virginia asks Eleonore about the rivalry, she muses that it's likely because both of their homelands are occupied by the Neuroi so they have nowhere to return to. That night, Inori decides to play the koto while Lyudmilla sings one of Aira's songs, which inspired her when she was young. Lyudmilla then admits to Aira that she not only wants to stand by her side, but to eventually surpass her as well. Aira meanwhile is reassured that her singing can actually help people. Later that night, Virginia follows Moffy outside where she helps rescue another Night Witch caught in a tree. The witch, Tomomi Nishisugi, turns out to be fan of Virginia and the Luminous Witches, and assures her that the band's music helps people smile. The next day, the band leaves for the final stop of their tour in Liberion.
9	"Together With the Stars"; Transliteration: "Hoshi to Tomo ni" (Japanese: 星と共に)	Akira Katō	Yū Mori	Shouji Saeki	September 4, 2022
The Luminous Witches arrive at their final stop in New York City, where they marvel at Liberion's prosperity due to having avoided being attacked directly by the Neuroi. Grace informs them that their final performance will be held at Fort Joy on an island in New York bay. As the rest of the band enjoys the sights in New York City, Eleonore muses that she would like to show Aira her own homeland of Gallia if it is ever liberated from the Neuroi. Joanna and Silvie start work on a new set of costumes. Joanna also takes the opportunity to visit her family, who are proud of her achievements. However, Joanna is troubled that seating at Fort Joy is limited, so not everybody will be able to see their performance. Hearing this, Aira decides to revise the performance choreography so that their airshow covers all of New York City, while Grace enlists the aid of a local textile mill to sew the band's new costumes. The performance proves to be a huge success, which the entire city being able to witness the Luminous Witches performing as they fly all over the city. Afterwards, as the band members rest, Grace arrives with news that the 501st Squadron has been able to destroy a Neuroi nest for the very first time, liberating Gallia from occupation.
10	"Hometown Skies"; Transliteration: "Kokyō no Sora" (Japanese: 故郷の空)	Kana Shundō	Yū Mori	Kana Shundō	September 11, 2022
The Luminous Witches return to Britannia, where they are immediately caught up in a massive public relations campaign to celebrate the liberation of Gallia. Eleonore in particular is focused on due to being a Gallian herself. During a break, Eleonore and Virginia briefly meet, with Virginia mentioning she is still looking for Moffy's homeland, while Eleonore is conflicted on returning to Gallia to see what Neuroi occupation has done to it. Meanwhile, Grace is informed the Luminous Witches may be chosen to perform at a special ceremony commemorating Gallia's liberation, but she also receives orders to transfer Virginia to a frontline unit now that her Night Witch powers have fully developed. The Luminous Witches then head to Gallia for a publicity tour. Eleonore brings Grace to her childhood home, where it's revealed she has past trauma from having to leave behind her pet cat while evacuating from the Neuroi invasion. She then sees a black swan familiar, which reacts to one of Moffy's feathers and she realizes Moffy is related to it. She also discovers her pet cat is still alive and well, now raising her own family of kittens. Eleonore then returns and shows Moffy a black swan feather, and she leads the witches to a nearby pond where an entire flock of black swans are waiting. Virginia says her goodbyes to Moffy and returns her to the flock. As they fly away, Virginia loses her ability to see them, meaning she has also lost her Witch powers.
11	"My and Everyone's Song"; Transliteration: "Watashi to Minna no Uta" (Japanese: わたしとみんなのうた)	Kōji Matsumura	Yū Mori	Takashi Kawabata; Shouji Saeki	September 18, 2022
Having lost her Witch powers, Virginia decides to resign from the band and is subsequently discharged from the military. The band is confirmed to be performing at Gallia's return ceremony, but all of the band members are left feeling down with Virginia's departure, especially when Aira reveals Virginia would have been transferred to a combat unit anyway if she had still been a Witch. Eleonore wonders if she made the right decision leading Moffy's flock to her location, and Aira assures her she did the right thing. However, the Luminous Witches decide to keep focusing on the concert preparations, while still making the assumption Virginia is still part of the band. Meanwhile, Virginia returns to her family but finds it difficult to adjust to her old life. After she hears a crowd singing one of the Luminous Witches' songs, Virginia realizes her place is with the band and rejoins them right before they are due to depart for Gallia.
12	"Everyone's World and Flying Skyhigh"; Transliteration: "Minna no Sekai & Flying Skyhigh" (Japanese: みんなの世界 & Flying Skyhigh)	Shouji Saeki	Rino Yamazaki	Shouji Saeki	September 25, 2022
Virginia rejoins the Luminous Witches, and Grace mentions that she had never officially submitted Virginia's resignation papers yet, meaning she is still officially part of the Luminous Witches. Grace also maintains that even though Virginia is no longer a Witch, that doesn't mean she can't perform on stage, and the band adjusts their performance accordingly. On the night of the liberation ceremony, the Luminous Witches begin their performance. However, in the middle of the concert, Moffy returns and becomes Virginia's familiar again, restoring her Witch powers and empowering her into her true form. With her new powers, Virginia is able to transmit a signal to all of the other Night Witches around the world, who resonate with it and create a magical phenomenon that allows the entire world to witness the concert remotely. As the Luminous Witches continue their performance, they reminisce about all the hardships they endured, the places around the world they travelled to, and the people they had met. Some time after the concert, it is revealed that Moffy's power has been mostly exhausted, and Virginia's Witch powers have gone back to normal. However, even with the World Tour over, Grace reminds the band that the war with the Neuroi is not over yet, so their songs will still be needed. The band returns to their home village in Britannia to celebrate their 1st anniversary concert, and then thank the audience for participating.

== Original video animation ==
=== Pilot OVA (2007) ===
No.	Title	Original release date
OVA	"Strike Witches"; Transliteration: "Sutoraiku Witchīzu" (Japanese: ストライクウィッチーズ)	January 1, 2007
Three months after being gathered into a fighting force, the Strike Witches enter into an intense mock battle between each other. After hesitating to fire her weapon at her friends, Yoshika Miyafuji is scolded by Mio Sakamoto, who suggests she should leave. As she prepares to leave, Yoshika runs into Minna-Dietlinde Wilcke, who convinces her to stay and protect her country.

=== Strike Witches: Operation Victory Arrow (2014) ===
No.	Title	Original release date
1	"St. Trond's Thunder"; Transliteration: "San Toron no Raimei" (Japanese: サン・トロンの雷鳴)	September 20, 2014
Six months following the battle in Venezia, Minna, Barkhorn, and Erica have been stationed at the St. Trond Base in Belgica, alongside fellow Karlsland witch Heidemarie W. Schnaufer. Ursula delivers a giant 50mm cannon, along with a Jet Striker Unit required to carry it, with Barkhorn chosen to test them, despite Erica's concerns following the last time Barkhorn rode a Jet Striker. Erica is soon brought out to test a Twin Striker with Ursula, but Erica's lack of patience causes the test to fail. Erica ends up lashing out at Ursula, calling all of her inventions useless, leading her to become downhearted. Later, Minna and Barkhorn come across an armored Neuroi, with Barkhorn deciding she needs to use the 50mm cannon against it, but they both become surrounded by splitting Neuroi. Erica, hearing Minna in danger, takes the Jet Striker and 50mm cannon herself and has trouble controlling it, but she is helped out by the arrival of Ursula. Working together, the sisters come to Minna's aid and use their combined strength to defeat the Neuroi.
2	"Goddess of the Aegean Sea"; Transliteration: "Ēga Umi no Megami" (Japanese: エーゲ海の女神)	March 13, 2015
Learning that island of Delos has been taken over by Neuroi, Charlotte and Lucchini are teamed up with Hanna and her partner Raisa Pottgen to draw out the Neuroi hiding within it. Lucchini, who has strong family ties with Delos, objects to their superior's plan to destroy the island, so they work out a new plan to have Hanna and Raisa draw out the Neuroi while Charlotte and Lucchini drop bombs on it. When this plan ends up failing, Lucchini tries to attack on but is inevitably forced to retreat. The next day, before the bombarbment on the island is due to take place, Charlotte, unwilling to let Lucchini down, decides to make use of an abandoned ship's winch to pull the Neuroi out of its hiding place, allowing it to be destroyed without any damage to the island. Afterwards, Lucchiini takes Charlotte and the others on a tour of Delos and its artifacts.
3	"Arnhem Bridge"; Transliteration: "Arunemu no Hashi" (Japanese: アルンヘムの橋)	May 2, 2015
Lynne and Perrine, along with Amelie Planchard, come across a young boy named Julius, getting treatment for his little sister Rose. As the two children stay at Perrine's house, with Julius proving a lot for Perrine to handle, Julius expresses a hatred towards witches for not coming to his father's aid when he went to battle at Arnhem Bridge. After learning that Perrine and the others are witches, Julius sneaks aboard a shipment bound for Arnhem Bridge to retrieve some personal belongings. With her Strike Unit in repair, Perrine steps in to protects Julius from the Neuroi until Lynne backs her up, with Julius helping Perrine in return when she injures her leg, allowing both her and Lynne to defeat the Neuroi. Afterwards, Perrine takes in both Julius and Rose to give them an education while Lynne receives a letter from Yoshika.

== Strike Witches: The Movie (2012) ==
No.	Title	Original release date
TBA	"Strike Witches: The Movie"; Transliteration: "Sutoraiku Witchīzu Gekijōban" (Japanese: ストライクウィッチーズ 劇場版)	March 17, 2012
Two months after the Neuroi nest's destruction in Venezia, Yoshika is adjusting to life in Fuso without her magic abilities. When Yoshika nearly falls down a waterfall while rescuing a stranded puppy, she is rescued by a Fuso witch named Shizuka Hattori, bringing her a visa to study at a medical school in Helvetia. Meanwhile in Venezia, where Shirley and Lucchini have a friendly boat race against the 504th unit, a strange transforming Neuroi with communication jamming abilities appears. With some assistance from the 504th, Shirley and Francesca manage to beat the Neuroi. As Yoshika and Shizuka travel on the Amagi, it collides with an iceberg, trapping one of the crew in the ammo storage with a fire breaking out. Ignoring Shizuka's warning not to enter the ammo storage, Yoshika rescues him and gets the sprinklers working, dismaying Shizuka. Upon arriving at Gallia, the two are greeted by Lynnette and Perrine and spend some time with some orphaned children Perrine looks after. Later, Shizuka realizes that Yoshika, despite not fitting the ideal image of a soldier, helped the 501st grow stronger. As Yoshika and Shizuka continue their journey, they stop at Rhine to aid people affected by a landslide. Meanwhile, Minna becomes curious about the reports on the new type of Neuroi, which appears too far away from the usual nests, sending Gertrude and Erica to investigate. Their search leads them to find several transforming Neuroi, as well as a tower-shaped one which escapes underground. As more Neuroi appear at a nearby village, Yoshika goes to help evacuate the villagers while Shizuka fights them in her first battle, though she is shot down by a surprise attack. With Shizuka rendered unconscious and a tower-type Neuroi heading towards the shelter, Yoshika is able to lure it away and destroy it, but she gets wounded. Coming across the grim situation as a large carrier-type Neuroi appears, Shizuka regains consciousness and attempts to fly out of the Neuroi's jamming range to call for help, informing the 501st of Yoshika's condition. As Yoshika hears the voices of her comrades, she regains her magical powers and heals her wounds. As the 501st fight against the Neuroi, Yoshika receives her Strike Unit from Mio and rejoins her friends to destroy the Neuroi carrier once and for all. With more Neuroi expected to come, the 501st Joint Fighter Wing is once again reformed.

== See also ==
- Strike Witches
- List of Strike Witches characters
- List of Brave Witches episodes - 2016 anime featuring a different set of characters
