= List of Brave Witches episodes =

Brave Witches (ブレイブウィッチーズ, Bureibu Witchīzu), or World Witches Series: 502nd Joint Fighter Wing Brave Witches, is an anime television series produced by Silver Link, which is a spin-off of the Strike Witches multimedia franchise created by Humikane Shimada. Taking place between the first and second seasons of Strike Witches, the series centers on the Fuso witch Hikari Karibuchi as she joins the titular squadron to fight the Neuroi forces when her sister Takami is seriously injured in battle. The series was directed by Kazuhiro Takamura and written by the Striker Unit scriptwriting team with Seikou Nagaoka serving as the music composer.

The series ran on Tokyo MX in Japan from October 6 to December 29, 2016 with later airings on 8 other stations; it was simulcast worldwide by Crunchyroll. In April 2017, Funimation announced that the English dubbed version would be streamed on their FunimationNow streaming service beginning on May 8. In Japan, the series was released on DVD and Blu-ray Disc in six compilations, each containing two episodes, from February 24 to July 28, 2017. An original video animation episode was released in select theaters on May 13, 2017, and included with a special edition volume released on August 25, 2017.

Two pieces of theme music are used: an opening theme and an ending theme. The opening theme is "Ashita no Tsubasa" (アシタノツバサ, lit. "Tomorrow's Wings") performed by Yoko Ishida and the ending theme is "Little Wing ~Spirit of Lindberg~" performed by the series' voice actresses as their characters.

== Episode list ==
No.	Title (Note: All English titles are taken from Crunchyroll.)	Original air date
1	"The Witch of Sasebo?"; Transliteration: "Sasebo no Mahō Shōjo?" (Japanese: 佐世保の魔法少女?)	October 6, 2016
In September 1944, young witch-in-training Hikari Karibuchi reunites with her sister Takami, who is part of the Third Aerial Squadron, in the Fuso city of Sasebo. Discovering that Takami is to be dispatched to Petersburg, Orussia, to join the 502nd Joint Fighter Wing, also known as the Brave Witches, Hikari decides to participate in a selection exam to be dispatched to Petersburg as well to join her sister, competing against fellow classmate Mia Misumi in a mock battle race. However, when Mia crashes and falls into the ocean, Hikari uses her magic to pull her out of the waters and rescue her. Having passed her exam despite technically not finishing it, Hikari is dispatched to Europe, where a new Neuroi Nest is forming.
2	"Take Flight, Chidori"; Transliteration: "Habatake Chidori" (Japanese: 羽ばたけチドリ)	October 13, 2016
On their journey to Europe, Takami tells Hikari about how she can hear the voice of her prototype Striker Unit, nicknamed Chidori. The next day, Takami is dispatched to fight a fleet of Neuroi craft appearing near the ship. Struggling with the large numbers, Takami is forced to use her Absolute Eye ability to destroy the fleet, but her excessive use of the ability quickly incapacitates her. Regretting how she was unable to protect her sister, Hikari borrows her Striker Unit and attempts to hold off the incoming Neuroi until the Brave Witches arrive to destroy them. With Takami rendered unconscious, Hikari asks to join the Brave Witches in her place, much to the dismay of Takami's close friend, Naoe Kanno.
3	"The 502nd Joint Fighter Wing"; Transliteration: "Dai Gō-maru-ni Tōgō Sentō Kōkū-dan" (Japanese: 第502統合戦闘航空団)	October 20, 2016
At Petersburg, Hikari meets the other members of the Brave Witches, including Nikka "Nipa" Edvardine Katajainen. As Hikari begins her training, squadron leader Gundula Rall and trainer Edytha Rossmann discover that her magic is insufficient to properly use Chidori. When Hikari mentions that she can use a special ability to see a Neuroi's core called Contact Eye, she is dispatched to fight a Neuroi ship with the other Witches. During the assault, Hikari is unable to replicate her Contact Eye, causing Gundula and Edytha to consider deporting her to Sasebo. Later, as Hikari and Naoe go to recover Nipa, who had crashed during the earlier battle, they end up encountering another Neuroi. With Naoe struggling to fight the Neuroi at a high altitude, Hikari and Nipa distract the Neuroi and buy Naoe enough time to destroy it. After reading Naoe's report, Gundula and Edytha decide to give Hikari one more week to prove herself.
4	"If You Want to Fight, Get Stronger!"; Transliteration: "Tatakai takereba Tsuyoku nare!" (Japanese: 戦いたければ強くなれ!)	November 3, 2016 (Note: This episode was originally scheduled to air on October 27, 2016. However, it was postponed due to delays in the production schedule.)
After discovering Hikari's weak magic during training, Edytha tasks her with climbing a tall pillar using only her magic and retrieve a hat from its top within one week. While Hikari remains persistent despite the test's high difficulty, she discovers that Edytha's strictness with her relates to how one of her previous students, who was also magically weak, got seriously injured in battle. On the seventh day, Edytha tells Hikari to redirect her magic into her hands, which allows her to climb the pillar more efficiently. Deliberately provoked by Naoe, Hikari successfully retrieves the hat and, having completed her training, joins the others on their mission to fight another Neuroi ship. After colliding with the Neuroi, Hikari uses her Contact Eye to see its core, which allows the Witches to destroy it. Later, Hikari is advised not to use her Contact Eye again, as Takami's excessive use of her Absolute Eye has already rendered her unconscious.
5	"Deadly Battle in the Freezing Cold"; Transliteration: "Gokkan no Shitō" (Japanese: 極寒の死闘)	November 10, 2016
Hikari befriends fellow Witch Georgette Lemare, who cleans the Witches' rooms and can use magic to heal injuries. Later, Hikari is dispatched on a recon mission to Petrozavodsk with both Georgette and the team's chef, Sadako Shimohara. Upon arriving in Petrozavodsk, the girls discover the town has been frozen by a blizzard caused by a Neuroi. Desiring to prove herself as a Witch, Sadako leads an assault against the Neuroi, but it freezes their Striker Units with its cold breath and causes the Witches to crash-land on the snow below. With Hikari suffering from frostbite, Sadako and Georgette are forced to take shelter in the snow and keep Hikari warm with their body heat. After Hikari regains consciousness, Georgette laments how she could not fully heal Takami, but Hikari thanks her for rescuing Takami in the first place. Unable to contact the Petersburg base about the oncoming Neuroi headed their way, Sadako devises a plan using materials from a nearby tank. Using flaming arrows to break through the Neuroi's frozen exterior, the Witches destroy it and return to Petersburg.
6	"Good Luck"; Transliteration: "Kōun wo" (Japanese: 幸運を)	November 17, 2016
The Witches learn that a marker-type Neuroi is hiding somewhere in a nearby town, sending signals to launch pinpoint attacks from outside. While pursuing the shape-shifting marker Neuroi alongside Hikari and Nipa, combat leader Alexsandra "Sasha" Ivanovna Pokryshkin experiences a flashback of the town, despite saying that she was never there before. While pondering why she has this memory, Sasha becomes annoyed with Nipa for drawing a doodle of a ladybug in her Striker Unit. The following day, after encountering the marker Neuroi again, Sasha remembers that she once came to this town to visit her grandmother and had sealed her memories out of fear of being marginalized as a Witch after using her magic in public. Using her recovered memories, Sasha discovers the marker Neuroi and destroys it, but not before it signals for one final attack on the town. Despite orders to evacuate, Nipa intercepts the shell and saves the town, later explaining that the doodle she drew in Sasha's Striker Unit was in gratitude for the "Good luck" message Sasha wrote in hers.
7	"On a Holy Night"; Transliteration: "Seinaru Yoru ni" (Japanese: 聖なる夜に)	November 24, 2016
In December, Hikari falls ill after Nipa takes her out sledding. To cheer up Hikari, who feels bad that her low magic ability led to her illness, Nipa has the other Witches organize the Saturnus Festival, which was scheduled to be canceled due to food shortages. As the Witches work on preparing the festivities, Nipa tells Hikari about how the previous year's festival helped her fit in with the Brave Witches. The plans deteriorate rapidly as everyone ends up in laughing fits after eating some strange mushrooms, leaving Nipa as the sole Witch who can fight off an attacking Neuroi. With Nipa struggling against the Neuroi's camouflage ability, the 501st Joint Fighter Wing's Eila Ilmatar Juutilainen and Sanya Litvyak arrive to help her destroy it. Later, Eila and Sanya deliver some supplies for the festival, helping to make it a heart-warming experience for Hikari.
8	"Grape Juice for Your Eyes"; Transliteration: "Kimi no Hitomi ni Budō Jūsu" (Japanese: 君の瞳にぶどうジュース)	December 1, 2016
Among the gifts delivered by Eila, including a FP-45 Liberator charm, the Witches discover some microfilms containing secret information about the Warlock, which was destroyed by the Strike Witches in Britannia after it went berserk. Thinking that a secret weapon is being sent to them among a cargo shipment, Waltrud Krupinski, along with Hikari, Naoe, and Nipa, are dispatched to assist a Britannian Witch in escorting the delivery fleet to Murmansk. While Naoe and Nipa test new Striker Units at the Murmansk base ahead of the fleet's arrival, Waltrud drinks liberal amounts of "grape juice" and develops a hangover. When a group of Neuroi suddenly appear before the Witches, Waltrud sobers up and assumes command of the mission. After Waltrud destroys the Neuroi, she is struck by some flying debris but is protected by the charm that Hikari had given her earlier. As Waltrud is hospitalized, the Neuroi regenerates itself, dragging Waltrud's Striker Unit with it.
9	"Break Witches"; Transliteration: "Bureiku Witchīzu" (Japanese: ブレイクウィッチーズ)	December 8, 2016
Concerned about not getting updates on Takami's condition, Hikari hears from Naoe about why she is determined to fight the Neuroi. When a Neuroi threatens to cut off supplies from Petrozavodsk once again, Naoe recklessly rushes into the oncoming fire and causes Sasha to get injured when she steps in to protect her. The next day, the Witches launch a counterattack against the Neuroi, which splits into multiple parts to keep its core hidden. Unwilling to let the Neuroi cut off the supply lines, Hikari gets permission to use her Contact Eye, but Naoe is hesitant to assist her out of fear of having someone injured again. After being convinced to regain her determination by Hikari, Naoe helps her find the core and destroy it, eventually accepting her as her partner. Meanwhile, Takami finally regains consciousness after being healed by the 501st Joint Fighter Wing's Yoshika Miyafuji.
10	"Big Sister and Little Sister"; Transliteration: "Ane to Imōto to." (Japanese: 姉と妹と。)	December 15, 2016
The Witches are requested to participate in Operation Freyja, in which the military are planning to use a giant railgun against the Grigori Neuroi nest. Takami returns to the base to inform Hikari of her imminent transfer to her original post in Kauhava, Suomus, as Takami is secretly concerned for her sister's safety. When the Witches discover that the Neuroi Waltrud had previously destroyed has revived, Hikari asks to compete against Takami to decide who will remain in the Brave Witches. To Takami's surprise, she discovers that the Neuroi's Core has a smaller true core inside it causing it to regenerate. Despite the Karibuchis being very close to determining the core's location and destroying the Neuroi, Takami wins by a small margin.
11	"We Won't Know Until We Try"; Transliteration: "Yatte Minakucha Wakaranai" (Japanese: やってみなくちゃわからない)	December 22, 2016
After Takami wins the match, Hikari receives Naoe's gloves and Waltrud's pistol charm as farewell presents before traveling with Eila and Sanya to Kauhava. Later, Takami and the remaining Witches begin their mission to safely escort the military's railway cannons to within firing range of Grigori. Once within range, the cannon fires a magic-infused anti-neuroi AP round at Grigori, dispersing the clouds surrounding it and exposing its main body. When one of the cannons get damaged, preventing it from firing, the Witches directly strike Grigori with the AP round itself, only to discover that it has another smaller core within it which Takami's ability cannot pinpoint. After listening to the mission over the radio, Hikari pursues Takami, worried that her Absolute Eye will endanger her once again.
12	"Shining with Light..."; Transliteration: "Hikari Kagayaite..." (Japanese: ひかり輝いて...)	December 29, 2016
As the Witches' battle with Grigori continues, Takami determines the core's location before she is shot down. However, Grigori regains its cloud shield and protects itself from the remaining AP round. While the military prepares to retreat, Hikari arrives and discovers Takami has survived thanks to the other Witches' support. Resonating with Hikari and Naoe's desire to keep fighting, the Witches discover the core of one of the shattered AP rounds and infuse its remaining magic into Naoe's gloves. With the help of the other Witches, Hikari and Naoe infiltrate Grigori and use their abilities to strike the core. Although Naoe's punch cannot completely destroy the core, Hikari uses the gun she received from Waltrud to destroy Grigori for good. With Hikari becoming an official member of the Brave Witches, they head off towards their next battlefield.
13 (OVA)	"Petersburg Grand Strategy"; Transliteration: "Peteruburugu Dai Senryaku" (Japanese: ペテルブルグ大戦略)	August 25, 2017
Following the Saturnus Festival, Eila is determined to go to Petersburg with Sanya, only for something to always come up and keep them occupied. As the witches prepare for a New Year's party, Eila starts to become jealous of Sanya getting close with the other girls. When an armored Neuroi appears during the New Year's party, Eila and Sanya are dispatched alongside Hikari, Sadako, and Edytha to destroy it, given everyone some fireworks to enjoy together.

== Home releases ==
=== Japanese ===
==== DVD ====
Kadokawa (Japan, Region 2 DVD)
Volume		Episodes	Release date	Ref.
ブレイブウィッチーズ	1	1-2	February 24, 2017	
ブレイブウィッチーズ	2	3-4	March 24, 2017	
ブレイブウィッチーズ	3	5-6	April 28, 2017	
ブレイブウィッチーズ	4	7-8	May 26, 2017	
ブレイブウィッチーズ	5	9-10	June 30, 2017	
ブレイブウィッチーズ	6	11-12	July 28, 2017	
ブレイブウィッチーズ	Special Edition	13	August 25, 2017	

==== Blu-ray ====
Kadokawa (Japan, Region A Blu-ray)
Volume		Episodes	Release date	Ref.
ブレイブウィッチーズ	1	1-2	February 24, 2017	
ブレイブウィッチーズ	2	3-4	March 24, 2017	
ブレイブウィッチーズ	3	5-6	April 28, 2017	
ブレイブウィッチーズ	4	7-8	May 26, 2017	
ブレイブウィッチーズ	5	9-10	June 30, 2017	
ブレイブウィッチーズ	6	11-12	July 28, 2017	
ブレイブウィッチーズ	Special Edition	13	August 25, 2017	

== See also ==
- List of Strike Witches episodes
- List of Strike Witches characters
