= Prince of Stride =

Japanese multimedia series

- Japanese cover art for the PlayStation Vita release of Prince of Stride.

プリンス・オブ・ストライド (Purinsu Obu Sutoraido)
- Genre: Sports
- Novel series
- Written by: Shūji Sogabe (Original work); Naruki Nagakawa (Volume 1–3 text); Yō Asahi (Volume 3–7 text)
- Illustrated by: FiFS
- Published by: ASCII Media Works
- Imprint: Sylph Comics
- Original run: November 22, 2012 – August 21, 2017
- Volumes: 7
- Video game
- Developer: Kadokawa Games, Vridge
- Publisher: Kadokawa Games, Dengeki Girl's Style
- Genre: Otome game, Sports game
- Platform: PlayStation Vita
- Released: July 30, 2015
- Manga

Prince of Stride: Galaxy Rush
- Written by: Teruko Arai
- Published by: ASCII Media Works
- Magazine: Dengeki Maoh
- Original run: 27 November 2015 – present
- Volumes: 1
- Anime television series

Prince of Stride: Alternative
- Directed by: Atsuko Ishizuka
- Written by: Taku Kishimoto
- Music by: Yoshiaki Fujisawa
- Studio: Madhouse
- Licensed by: Crunchyroll (streaming); AUS: Madman Entertainment
- Original network: AT-X, Tokyo MX, Sun TV, KBS, TV Aichi, BS11
- Original run: January 5, 2016 – March 22, 2016
- Episodes: 12

Prince of Stride (プリンス・オブ・ストライド, Purinsu Obu Sutoraido) is a Japanese multimedia series by ASCII Media Works. The project was unveiled in April 2012 in Dengeki Girl's Style. It spawned a light novel, as well as an otome game adaptation developed by Kadokawa Games and Vridge for the PlayStation Vita. An anime television series adaptation developed by Madhouse entitled Prince of Stride: Alternative (プリンス・オブ・ストライド オルタナティブ, Purinsu Obu Sutoraido Orutanatibu) aired from January 5, 2016, to March 22, 2016. A spin-off manga entitled Prince of Stride Galaxy Rush launched in November 2015 in Dengeki Maoh. The series is based around the fictional extreme sport of "stride", where teams of six run a relay race including parkour elements through a town.

== Plot ==
The series revolves around the extreme sport "Stride", where a team of 5 runners and their information-giving "relationer" completes relay races that take place in towns. Nana Sakurai, a first-year Hōnan Academy high school student, decided to join her school's Stride club after she watched a "Best Stride Ever" video two years ago alongside her classmates Takeru Fujiwara and Riku Yagami. Upon learning the Hōnan Stride club has been inactive for two years following a violent incident, they decided try to re-establish the school's "Stride" team by recruiting 6 members. Both Takeru and Riku asked Nana to become a relationer as well as a manager. Their goal is to join other schools to compete and win Eastern Japan's top Stride competition, the "End of Summer" as well as developing a friendship with the Saisei Academy stride club, who are also an idol group called "Galaxy Standard".

== Characters ==
=== Hōnan (方南) ===
Prior to the series, Hōnan's Stride club used to be a popular club until an accident that decreased its popularity, making it so small that all of its members were automatically entered into the Shogi club. In the visual novel (with the exception of Ayumu and Yujiro) all of Hōnan's Stride club members serve as Nana's love interests.

Nana Sakurai (桜井 奈々, Sakurai Nana)
Voiced by: Kana Hanazawa (Japanese); Natalie Hoover (English)
Nana is the player character in the visual novel and the protagonist in the anime. She is a hardworking girl who has moved alone from Hokkaido to Tokyo, and has transferred to Hōnan Academy due to her admiration of the old Stride team. Soon after joining, she was given the position of the relationer of the Stride club by Fujiwara as well as her role as a manager. Since her father is known as the "King of Stride", Nana is unofficially known as the "Princess of Stride".
Riku Yagami (八神 陸, Yagami Riku)
Voiced by: Ryohei Kimura (Japanese); Austin Tindle (English)
Riku is another freshman who becomes friends with Nana on their first meeting. He is cheerful and friendly, and also has good motor skills. He loves all kinds of sports except Kabaddi, and wishes to join all of the sports clubs in the school. His family runs a bakery shop. He and his older brother Tomoe used to run together since they were kids. However, Riku felt overshadowed by Tomoe being much better at running than him, and Riku chooses not to involve himself with Stride until he meets Nana and starts running again to be able to compete with Tomoe. In the visual novel, he serves as one of Nana's love interests.
Takeru Fujiwara (藤原 尊, Fujiwara Takeru)
Voiced by: Nobuhiko Okamoto (Japanese); Ricco Fajardo (English)
Always cool and stoic, his only interest is Stride. In middle school, he was a famous Stride runner. He usually wears glasses with no frames on top, but during practice he uses contacts. He seems to have strong faith in Riku's athletic ability as Riku finished in a dead-heat in the 2-on-2 race against Heath. He tends to feel people's legs to determine their talent, but ends up creeping them out. It is later revealed that he can't swim or sing. Takeru has conflicts with his father for pursuing his dream rather following his father's expectations. Takeru was finally able convince his father thanks to Nana. In the visual novel, he serves as one of Nana's love interests.
Hozumi Kohinata (小日向 穂積, Kohinata Hozumi)
Voiced by: Kensho Ono (Japanese); Clifford Chapin (English)
He looks cute and loves collecting plushies, but actually loves terrible jokes and wants to work in the theater. Even if he's injured, he always carries a smile. The caring eldest son of a big family. He especially cares for Ayumu. His technique is such that he relies more on acrobatic parkour skills rather than running speed to overtake others, thus being touted as "The Trickster of Hōnan". A running gag in the series is Heath's older sister often forcing him to cross-dress model due to his feminine appearance. It is shown he is from a broken family and has had to care for his younger siblings. He has a grudge toward his father since he left him and his mother. However, he finally learns the truth: the reason he left them was because their business is going bankrupt and he didn't want them involved. Just as Hozumi decided to meet him, he was shocked to find out that his father is now dead. Hoizumi cried and thanked Nana for helping him. In the visual novel, he serves as one of Nana's love interests.
Heath Hasekura (支倉 ヒース, Hasekura Heath)
Voiced by: Daisuke Ono (Japanese); Jason Liebrecht (English)
Leader of the Stride club. Full of manly spirit, he has a dependable aura. He's half British and has two sisters; one is the president of a company, the other is a model. Heath himself also models sometimes against his will. In the past, Heath, Kyosuke, and Tomoe were part of "Honan's Golden Trio" until an incident two years ago, which resulted in its disbandment. It is also revealed he is the weakest of the trio. He didn't feel practice was necessary since the club didn't have enough members to even race, and thus was de-registered by the Japanese Stride Association (JSA). He later regains hope when Nana, Riku, and Takeru join the Stride club. He manages to convince Kuga to come back, as well and thanking Nana for helping himm regain his hope. In the visual novel, he serves as one of Nana's love interests.
Kyōsuke Kuga (久我 恭介, Kuga Kyōsuke)
Voiced by: Junichi Suwabe (Japanese); Ivan Jasso (English)
A former member of Hōnan's stride club. He's considered as a somewhat scary person because of an incident that he took the blame for and quit stride club. Kuga has a mysterious vibe to him and may often appear as a loner. Despite this, he is actually a very kind person. He is finally convinced to rejoin the Stride club by Heath. With the help of Kaede and his father, he was able to clear his name and thanks Nana for this. He enjoys buying foods or drinks for Nana since he thinks it will makes her smile. In the visual novel, he serves as one of Nana's love interests.
Ayumu Kadowaki (門脇 歩, Kadowaki Ayumu)
Voiced by: Hiro Shimono (Japanese); Micah Solusod (English)
He is a passionate Shogi player first, self-proclaimed "King" and leader of the Shogi club (the only true member), reluctant runner second. He has green hair and wears glasses. He was a Relationer last year, and relayed information to Heath and Hozumi in the 2-on-2 race. He then contemplated quitting the team and the Shogi club because he has no talent as a runner before Kyosuke took his place. Ayumu has been friends with Hozumi since their first year and it seems he is aware about his current situation, like Ayumu knew Hozumi's smile is fake and his heart is never happy. He entrusted Nana care of Hozumi since he knew she can make Hozumi truly smile again.
Yūjirō Dan (壇 悠次郎, Dan Yūjirō)
Voiced by: Ryotaro Okiayu (Japanese); J. Michael Tatum (English)
The coach and advisor of the Stride team. He often speaks using four-character idiomatic phrases. Somehow, he never uses the same ones. In the past, he used to be Joe's junior in high school and he sees Nana can help Hōnan's Stride club regain its glory.

=== Saisei ===
Team name: Galaxy Standard, which is also an idol band, and is the first rival of Honan, having been matched up on their debut match.

Reiji Suwa (諏訪 怜治, Suwa Reiji)
Voiced by: Mamoru Miyano (Japanese); Justin Briner (English)
The captain of Saisei Stride Club. A competitive person, and his competitiveness triggered an after match with Takeru. Despite being competitive, he is very friendly toward his rivals. He came from a famous Kabuki dancer family, which is very rich and they want Reiji to quit both his Idol and Stride activity in order to continue family traditions. Inside his cheerful and relaxed personality, he is shown very stressful because he must taking all responsibilities for his stride team, idol activity, and his family's heavy inheritance burden. This is resulting him collapses several times. This would change upon meeting Nana first time after finding her phone, which he took interest on her since they have same phone charm and he nicknamed Nana is "Dosanko-chan" (a nickname for someone born and raised in Hokkaido). In Visual Novel, he serves as one of Nana's love interest and is only from Saisei.

Shizuma Mayuzumi (黛 静馬, Mayuzumi Shizuma)
Voiced by: Daisuke Hirakawa (Japanese); Garret Storms (English)
The relationer of Saisei Stride Club and faithful aide of Suwa Reiji. Dubbed as "superhuman" because he can do everything (maybe except cooking) by his younger brother, Mayuzumi Azuma. He can give accurate command to his runners. In the past, he was a runner until an incident required him to use a wheelchair. After going through physiotherapy, he is able to walk again.

Bantarō Chiyomatsu (千代松 万太郎, Chiyomatsu Bantarō)
Voiced by: Takuya Eguchi (Japanese); Josh Grelle (English)
Likes to be referred to as "Ban-chan". He is also known as the "Trickster" of Saisei, is lively, and full of enthusiasm. He is becoming good friends with Ayumu and Hozumi since they love making silly jokes.
Tasuku Senoo (妹尾 匡, SenooTasuku)
Voiced by: Tatsuhisa Suzuki (Japanese); Shawn Gann (English)
He is very serious and will do almost anything to help Mr. Reiji win. He will often shove the other Stride team to the side, like he did with Heath.
Asuma Mayuzumi (黛 遊馬, Mayuzumi Asuma)
Voiced by: Yūki Ono (Japanese); Joel McDonald (English)
Younger brother of Mayuzumi Shizuma. His teammates make fun of him for being the most plain in the group because of his minimal stage presence. He is becoming close friends with Riku since they have older brothers, he jokes they both have "superhumans" as older brothers.
Kaede Okumura (奥村 楓, Okumura Kaede)
Voiced by: Toshiyuki Toyonaga (Japanese); Jean-Luc Hester (English)
Huge fan of Kuga Kyosuke. He tries his best to beat Kuga, and often shows off while running in a Stride race. His father is revealed to be a politician.

=== Mihashi ===
Kei Kamoda (鴨田 慶, Kamoda Kei)
Voiced by: Yoshitsugu Matsuoka (Japanese); Ian Sinclair (English)
The captain of Mihashi Stride Club. He also is the secret true Relationer of the team. He wants to win since it was his brother's last summer.
Yū Kamoda (鴨田 侑, Kamoda Yū)
Voiced by: Natsuki Hanae (Japanese); Jerry Jewell (English)
The Relationer of Mihashi Stride Club in name only. He mainly bluffs and calls out false sets.
Aoi Shima (嶋 葵, Shima Aoi)
Voiced by: Kengo Kawanishi (Japanese); Derick Snow (English)
Hisato Harigaya (針ヶ谷 久人, Harigaya Hisato)
Voiced by: Daiki Hamano (Japanese); Chris Guerrero (English)
Takeshi Eifuku (永福 武志, Eifuku Takeshi)
Voiced by: Taishi Murata (Japanese); Christopher Bevins (English)
Nobuhiko Nagatsuka (長塚 乃彦, Nagatsuka Nobuhiko)
Voiced by: Itaru Yamamoto (Japanese); Kaiji Tang (English)

=== Ichijyōkan ===
Yuri Himemiya (姫宮 悠李, Himemiya Yuri)
Voiced by: Daiki Yamashita (Japanese); Bryce Papenbrook (English)
A third-year runner who looks like a girl and has the best parkour skills on his team. He's sworn Hozumi as his enemy.
Shiki Dozono (堂園 志貴, Dozono Shiki)
Voiced by: Kaito Ishikawa (Japanese); Chris Patton (English)
The third-year Relationer who is very sadistic and tries to use past traumas against opponents. He thinks the Relationer is supreme, and that the others cannot run without him. His attitude is to the point one of the Ichijyōkan runners turns off their earpiece in the middle of the race so that they don't have to listen to his abuse anymore.
Kaoru Shishibara (獅子原 馨, Shishibara Kaoru)
Voiced by: Yūsuke Kobayashi (Japanese); Cris George (English)
A third-year runner who was pitted against Kuga. He's been naturally blessed with an excellent body, a simple mind, and has never felt any stress or troubles.
Kiyoto Washimi (鷲見 紀世斗, Washimi Kiyoto)
Voiced by: Hiromichi Tezuka (Japanese); Marcus D. Stimac (English)
A third-year runner who was the anchor for Ichijikan. He was badly outmatched by Takeru. He is one of Himemiya Yuri's henchmen.
Arata Samejima (鮫島 改, Samejima Arata)
Voiced by: Kengo Kawanishi (Japanese); Kyle Phillips (English)
A third-year runner who's popular with the girls. He is one of Himemiya Yuri's three henchmen.
Tetsu Hachiya (蜂屋 鉄, Hachiya Tetsu)
Voiced by: Yoshitsugu Matsuoka (Japanese); Anthony Bowling (English)
A third-year runner who is very talkative, annoying, and noisy. He fell in love with Yuri without knowing he was a guy. He is one of Yuri's three henchmen.

=== Kakyôin ===
Tomoe Yagami (八神 巴, Yagami Tomoe)
Voiced by: Takahiro Sakurai (Japanese); Todd Haberkorn (English)
Yagami Riku's older brother. A former member of the Hōnan Stride team who left in his third year of high school to study abroad in America. He returns to invite Kuga to join his school.
Amatsu Ida (維田 天, Ida Amatsu)
Voiced by: Tetsuya Kakihara (Japanese); Greg Ayres (English)
Tōya Natsunagi (夏凪 瞳弥, Natsunagi Tōya)
Voiced by: Shouta Aoi (Japanese); Aaron Dismuke (English)
Nampei Aoba (青葉 南平, Aoba Nampei)
Voiced by: Ikuji Nose (Japanese); Oscar Seung (English)
Hajime Izumino (五十公野 哉, Izumino Hajime)
Voiced by: Ryōta Ōsaka (Japanese); Chris Burnett (English)
Ryō Izumino (五十公野 了, Izumino Ryō)
Voiced by: Natsuki Hanae (Japanese); Seth Magill (English)
Joe Sakurai (桜井 ジョウ, Sakurai Jō)
Voiced by: Tōru Ōkawa (Japanese); Robert McCollum (English)
The new coach of the Kakyôin Stride team and Nana's father. He is known as the "King" for making the sport popular in Japan. He was working in America at the start of the series before coming back just before the End of Summer tournament.

=== Other ===
Diane Hasekura (支倉 ダイアン, Hasekura Daian)
Voiced by: Sayaka Ohara (Japanese); Elizabeth Maxwell (English)
Heath's elder sister and the president of a fashion company. In exchange for sponsoring the Honan Stride Club, she has the team members model her company's clothes. Initially, the deal was that they win Kichijoji Spring Festival. After suffering through the bragging of a rival company (who was sponsoring the Saisei Stride Team), Diane continued to sponsor Honan and created new jerseys for the team to wear for official matches.

== Media ==
=== Light novel ===
A light novel adaptation has been published by Kadokawa company, best known for publishing Bang Dream! print media. It was known as "Visual Novel" (a light novel with many illustration). It was published on November 22, 2012, and ended on August 21, 2017.

=== Video game ===
The otome game was announced during Dengeki game festival 2014. The game was initially released on July 9, 2015, but was later delayed to July 30, 2015. It is exclusive to the PlayStation Vita console. The limited version included a drama CD and a booklet.

The game storyline follows the novel's storyline, but with romance elements added. All of Hōnan's runners (except Ayumu) are Nana's love interests. In addition to Hōnan, Reiji Suwa from Saisei also serves as Nana's love interest and is only from another school.

=== Anime ===
The anime's opening theme song is "Strider's High" by OxT (Masayoshi Ōishi x Tom-H@ck). The anime's ending theme is "Be My Steady" by Galaxy Standard, a music unit composed of the voice actors from the anime's Saisei Academy Stride Club (Mamoru Miyano, Daisuke Hirakawa, Takuya Eguchi, Tatsuhisa Suzuki, Yuuki Ono, and Toshiyuki Toyonaga). Funimation has licensed the anime to stream the anime in both subtitled and dubbed versions.

As the name implied, the anime adaptation will have different storyline instead of being adapted from the novel (due the novel still being published). Riku is the anime's protagonist, and it follows his story of joining stride club to defeat his brother.

==== Episode list ====
All episode are numbered by Step followed by the title of the episode.

No.	Official English title (Note: All English titles are taken from Funimation.) Original Japanese title	Original release date
1	"On Your Mark - The Beginning of Destiny" "ON YOUR MARK Unmei no hajimari" (ON YOUR MARK 運命のはじまり)	January 5, 2016
Nana Sakurai loves Stride, the street-running team sport. She chooses to enter Honan Academy based on an internet video she saw of the Honan Stride Club. However, choosing an academic path based on an internet video may not have been a good idea - especially when one Stride recruit is unwilling to help.
2	"Believe - I Will Always Be Here" "BELIEVE Itsu demo ore wa koko ni iru" (BELIEVE いつでも俺はここにいる)	January 12, 2016
It's clear that Takeru Fujiwara is a very talented runner, though it seems like he has teamwork problems. The Honan Academy Stride Club has plenty of other problems too, and they only have a few weeks to solve them all.
3	"Galaxy - Now, Stars Who Shine" "GALAXY Ima, hoshi-tachi ga kagayaku" (GALAXY いま、星たちが輝く)	January 19, 2016
The Kichijoji Spring Stride Festival is on; Honan Academy faces off against Saisei High School, a powerful and famous team. After a run-in with them before the match, Riku is already intimidated.
4	"Run - When the Mind is Full" "RUN Toki ni kokoro ga ippai desu" (RUN ときに心がいっぱいです)	January 26, 2016
Stride season is here, and high school teams from all over Japan compete for the spot in the End of Summer event. Honan faces off against Mihashi in the Atami hot springs resort area.
5	"Again - Just You, Only You" "AGAIN Tada anata dake anata ni" (AGAIN ただあなただけあなたに)	February 2, 2016
Honan Academy wins the race, but Ayumu is injured in the process. They must find a replacement soon, but in order to do so, the team must revisit a painful event from the past.
6	"Team - Connect Emotions, Become the Wind" "TEAM — Kanjoo o setsuzoku shimasu, Kaze ni narimasu" (TEAM — 感情を接続します, 風になります)	February 9, 2016
Kuga comes back to the Honan team and they face off Ichijokan at Shinjuku, in place of injured Ayumu. Ichijokan's relationer uses the trauma of KGB incident to win, but the relation is pulled off successfully.
7	"Rival - A Promise for August" "RIVAL 8 Tsuki no yakusoku" (RIVAL 8 月の約束)	February 16, 2016
Before the EOS final, Honan and Saisei teams have a joint practice in Saisei's stride facility.
8	"Wall - Chasing, Still So Far Away" "WALL Tsuiseki, Mada tooku hanare" (WALL 追跡,まだ遠く離れ)	February 23, 2016
EOS time trial: Saisei vs Tsubakimachi and Honan vs Kakyoin in Sapporo Dome. Will Honan get intimated by their former competitor?
9	"Home - The One and Only" "HOME Koko ni shikanai mono" (HOME ここにしかないもの)	March 1, 2016
The team is under a lot of stress from intensive training - especially Riku and Takeru - which causes them to not be able to work well together. Because of this, the rest of the team decides to take them to a water park to relieve stress and secretly get Riku and Takeru to reconcile.
10	"Stand Up - Because You Were There" "STAND UP Anata ga attanode" (STAND UP あなたがあったので)	March 8, 2016
Riku loses hope that he'll ever be able to be as good as everyone wants him to so he can catch up to his brother. Will Takeru be able to reignite his passion for Stride?
11	"High Touch - For You, Who Gave Me the Smile" "HIGH TOUCH Anata wa watashi o egao ni tsukura remashita" (HIGH TOUCH あなたは私を笑顔に作られました)	March 15, 2016
It's finally the day of the EOS match, and a rematch with Saisei. Will Honan be able to win, even though Saisei has been holding back during the training camp?
12	"End of Summer - And Beyond" "End of Summer - soshite, biyondo" (End of Summer - そして、ビヨンド」)	March 22, 2016
After winning the EOS semi-final, it's on to the final stride. The rest of Honan wants Riku to be the anchor (the team member to complete the race) just so he can face Tomoe, who happens to be that of the Kakyoin team. A thrilling end to the street-running sport!

=== Stage play ===
During Dengeki Spring festival 2016, it was announced Prince of Stride would receive a five-episode stage play adaptation called Prince of Stride THE LIVE STAGE. The plays will feature actors trained in parkour, and they will run on stage and throughout the seating area while a wind effect blows through the audience.

The first four episodes will adapt the novel story while episode 5 is an original story taking place one year after the end of summer 2017.

The episode 5 story depicted a mysterious man named Isamu Isurugi, who was Joe's rival in the past and created a Stride team to participate in America. He recruited students from different schools, both current and graduated stride members, including Yuri, Reiji, and Takeru. This created conflict, forcing Takeru to choose between pursuing his dream or staying with Riku and Nana. Upon learning of this, Reiji, Shizuma, Yuri, Toya, and Tomoe asked Joe to create his own team and challenge the Isamu team to a stride battle. Nana and Riku joined his stride team, fixing their strained friendship.
