= List of Strike Witches characters =

The Strike Witches mixed-media project features an extensive cast of characters created by Fumikane Shimada. The series takes place in an alternate Earth in the mid-20th century and revolves around a group of teenage moe anthropomorphic girls who use machines equipped to their legs known as Striker Units to do aerial combat. The characters are named after real-life pilots whilst their Striker Units are based on actual aircraft.

The main character of the manga and anime series is Yoshika Miyafuji, and the main character of the light novel series is Tomoko Anabuki, both of whom are witches from the Fuso Empire. In the anime and manga series, Yoshika joins the 501st Joint Fighter Wing, an international military squadron which also includes Minna-Dietlinde Wilcke, Mio Sakamoto, Charlotte E. "Shirley" Yeager, Lynette Bishop, Perrine H. Clostermann, Erica Hartmann, Gertrud Barkhorn, Francesca Lucchini, Eila Ilmatar Juutilainen, and Sanya V. Litvyak. In the light novel series, Tomoko joins the Suomus Independent Volunteer Aerial Squadron, another international squadron which also includes Haruka Sakomizu, Elizabeth F. Beurling, Katharine O'Hare, Ursula Hartmann, Elma Leivonen and Giuseppina Cenni. Together, the squadrons fight against the Neuroi, an alien race that threatens the universe.

== 501st Joint Fighter Wing ==
The protagonists of the anime are part of the 501st Joint Fighter Wing (第501統合戦闘航空団, Daigōmaruichi Tōgō Sentō Kōkū Dan), a multinational team of 11 soldiers commanded by Minna-Dietlinde Wilcke, also known as the Strike Witches.

The members of the 501st Joint Fighter Wing before Shizuka Hattori joins and replaces Mio Sakamoto.

(Japan) Yoshika Miyafuji (宮藤 芳佳, Miyafuji Yoshika)
Voiced by: Misato Fukuen (Japanese); Cherami Leigh (English)
Yoshika is the 14-year-old, later 15-year-old, protagonist of Strike Witches, hailing from the Fusō Empire. She comes from a family of clinicians who use their magic powers to heal people. Due to her drive to help people in need, Yoshika's power grants her the ability to heal most injuries at a much faster and more efficient rate than most witches can. Consequently, she also serves as the unofficial squadron medic. Yoshika's power allows her to erect a magic shield far larger and more powerful than that of most witches as well. Yoshika is able to concentrate her power into a smaller but more powerful shield and use it like a battering ram against Neuroi.
Before the events of the series, her father Ichirō designs the Striker Units the Strike Witches use to fight. However, because of her father's death in the war, she is vehemently against fighting when Mio Sakamoto appears to recruit her. After helping to defend the Fusō fleet heading to Britannia from a Neuroi attack, however, she decides to join the 501st, entering with the rank of Sergeant. Yoshika has a talent for cooking but tends to care more about her food's health benefits than its taste. Yoshika carries a type 99 aircraft cannon along with a M712 in battle. Eventually, Yoshika loses her magical powers after stopping the Neuroi threat in Romagna, where she is promoted to the rank of Ensign. However, in Strike Witches: The Movie, she manages to regain her powers and reunite with her teammates. In Strike Witches: Road to Berlin, it's revealed that her officer rank only applies as a medic, but Master Sergeant otherwise. In the Maidens of the Heavens manga, she has a small gray dog as a familiar.
Her original Striker Unit is modeled after the Mitsubishi A6M "Zero" naval fighter but switched to a Striker prototype unit, nicknamed Magnificent Lightning made by her father for her modeled after the Kyushu J7W Shinden after her magical power overpowers her original Striker Unit in her campaigns in Romagna. It was lost in the Adriatic Sea shortly after the Romagna campaign when she lost her magical powers, just to be later recovered and repaired. In Strike Witches: Road to Berlin, Yoshika receive a Kawanishi N1K "Shinden Kai" as her new Striker Unit before permanently replaced by her father's restored Magnificent Lightning during Operation Southwind's final battle in Berlin.
(Japan) Mio Sakamoto (坂本 美緒, Sakamoto Mio)
Voiced by: Saeko Chiba (2007–2010), Saori Seto (2010–present) (Japanese); Kira Vincent-Davis (English)
Mio is the first Strike Witch and commander in battle of the unit, with the rank of Major. Mio is the oldest witch in the 501st at 19 years old and, like Yoshika Miyafuji, hails from Fusō. She is a veteran of the early fighting against the Neuroi. Years before the events of the series, she befriended Yoshika's father Ichirō while he was designing the Striker Unit and became the first person to pilot one. Her usual task is to train new recruits. Under Mio's eyepatch is a magic eye that grants her increased visual acuity and the ability to spot Neuroi cores when used. Being in her late teens, Mio's magical power has declined too far for her to generate effective shields in combat. However, she can still fly and use her magical eye. She carries a Type 99 aircraft cannon into battle along with a magical katana strapped to her back capable of cutting through Neuroi. In the second season, she builds herself an enhanced katana called the Reppumaru that can cut through Neuroi beams to compensate for the lack of shields. However, the sword drains a substantial amount of magic, shortening her lifespan as a Witch. In the third season, Mio officially retires from combat due to her magic power diminishing with Shizuka assuming her position in the front lines.
Her Striker Unit started out as the same production unit as Miyafuji being an A6M "Zero" model and also a Naval pilot Witch but soon changed to a model that's modeled after the Kawanishi N1K nicknamed Violet Lightning.
(Germany) Minna-Dietlinde Wilcke (ミーナ・ディートリンデ・ヴィルケ, Mīna Dītorinde Viruke)
Voiced by: Rie Tanaka (Japanese); Anastasia Muñoz (English)
Minna is the 18-year-old commander of the 501st Joint Fighter Wing from Karlsland with the rank of Commander. Her first priority is the safety of her subordinates. She often acts as the "good cop" to Mio Sakamoto's "bad cop" when it comes to discipline. She has a talent for singing, having wanted to become a professional before she joined the war effort before the beginning of the series. After her close friend is killed in battle, however, Minna gives up her dream and issues an order prohibiting the male workers on the base from having unauthorized contact with the witches, hoping to spare others from the pain she experienced. She is very protective of Mio, usually intervening whenever the Major does something reckless. Her power grants her enhanced spatial awareness, allowing her to pinpoint the location and number of objects from a great distance. Her affiliation is the Karlsland JG 3 Luftwaffe. During combat she arms herself with an MG 42.
Her Striker Unit is modeled after the Messerschmitt Bf 109F.
(United Kingdom) Lynette Bishop (リネット・ビショップ, Rinetto Bishoppu)
Voiced by: Kaori Nazuka (Japanese); Kate Bristol (English)
Lynette, also called "Lynne", is the only Witch in the 501st from the Britannian Commonwealth. As the middle child of eight siblings from a pretty affluent family, Lynette develops very domestic and practical habits and is also very shy and soft-spoken. After meeting Yoshika Miyafuji, the two eventually become best friends. Also proves to be a pretty good cook, often serving and preparing meals for the entire team together with Miyafuji. Lynette holds the rank of Master Sergeant and her affiliation is the Britannian Air Force 610th Fighter Squadron. Her armaments are a Mk. I Boys anti-tank rifle and a Bren light machine gun. She serves as the squadron's sharpshooter and possesses an ability to supercharge magic power into shots she fires.
Her Striker Unit is modeled after the Supermarine Spitfire.
(France) Perrine H. Clostermann (ペリーヌ・クロステルマン, Perīnu Kurosuteruman)
Voiced by: Miyuki Sawashiro (Japanese); Jad Saxton (English)
Perrine, full name Pierrette-Henriette Clostermann (ピエレッテ = アンリエット・クロステルマン, Pierette Anrietto Kurosuteruman), is a 15-year-old heiress to an influential Gallian family who looks down on some of the less-refined habits of her peers. Years before the start of the series, the Neuroi's conquest of her homeland devastated her and has caused her numerous problems.
She often refuses to work as part of a team and is initially hostile towards Yoshika Miyafuji due to the latter's attachment to Mio Sakamoto, on whom Perrine has an obvious crush. Over time, Perrine is able to warm up considerably to Yoshika, and the two are shown to be good friends by the time of the movie. Perrine feels that she is responsible for the reconstruction and rehabilitation of Gallia after its liberation from the Neuroi and contributes her entire salary toward this end. Perrine holds the rank of First Lieutenant and her original unit was the Forces Aériennes Galliaises Libres 602nd Flying Corps. She carries a rapier in artwork, which briefly appears in episode 9 of the second season as an heirloom from her family. She uses a Bren light machine gun and PIAT. She has a lightning based spell called Tonnerre which can strike down multiple targets.
Her Striker Unit is modeled after the French fighter plane, the Dewoitine D.520.
(Germany) Erica Hartmann (エーリカ・ハルトマン, Ērika Harutoman)
Voiced by: Sakura Nogawa (Japanese); Luci Christian (English)
Erica is Karlsland's 16-year-old "ultra ace" of the Luftwaffe JG 52 with more than 200 confirmed victories and the rank of Captain. While extremely efficient and strategic in battle, Erica is very messy with her belongings and often neglects cleaning chores. She is very slack, has a nonchalant attitude for military discipline, and is only serious when the situation calls for it. Consequently, she is the frequent target of the strait-laced Barkhorn's disciplinary lectures, which she normally ignores and tunes out. Her special technique is an offensive barrel roll named Sturm which manipulates powerful gusts of wind to attack enemies. In the movie, Hartmann combined her Sturm ability with Perrine's Tonnerre spell, creating a lightning storm that more than doubles the effectiveness of their individual skills. With her Striker Unit equipped, Erica gains Dachshund features. Her armaments are the MG 42 and an MP 40. Her Striker Unit also models after a variant of the Bf 109, typical of Karlsland witches.
(Germany) Gertrud Barkhorn (ゲルトルート・バルクホルン, Gerutorūto Barukuhorun)
Voiced by: Mie Sonozaki (Japanese); Stephanie Sheh (English)
Gertrud is an 18-year-old Witch originating from Karlsland with the rank of Captain, same as Hartmann, she also came from Luftwaffe JG 52. Quiet, efficient, and private, she tends to support her comrades from the shadows. Her calm attitude grants her battlefield stamina, allowing her to rack up an impressive shot-down tally. A long-time acquaintance of Minna-Dietlinde Wilcke and Erica Hartmann, she is often seen supporting the former in her leadership tasks and chastising the latter for her sloppiness. In Strike Witches 2, Barkhorn divides her room, which she shares with Hartmann, with a picket fence which she dubs her Siegfried Line to separate her side of the room from Hartmann's messy, unruly side. She has a younger sister named Christiane Barkhorn that she cares deeply for, and who is injured during the Neuroi invasion of her country. Yoshika's resemblance to Christiane causes Barkhorn to develop an attachment to the newest member of the 501st, and also results in occasional embarrassment for the normally stoic Barkhorn. Her magical power grants immense physical strength, to the extent where she can lift massive steel girders many times her size. For battle her armament consists of an MG 42, Panzerfaust, MG 131, or MG 151 which she dual wields, in keeping with her magically-enhanced strength.
Same as both Erica and Minna, her Striker Unit models after a variant of the Bf 109.
(Italy) Francesca Lucchini (フランチェスカ・ルッキーニ, Furanchesuka Rukkīni)
Voiced by: Chiwa Saitō (Japanese); Trina Nishimura (English)
Lucchini is the youngest member of the 501st at 12 years old, having joined the unit from the Duchy of Romagna. With a rank of Ensign, her unit affiliation was with Romagna's Sovrana Aeronautica Romagniana 4th Air Unit. Lucchini is often childish and self-indulgent. In battle she displays a talent and passion for flying. In battle she carries a M1919 A6, Breda-SAFAT 12.7 mm machine gun, or Beretta Model 1938A submachine gun, as well as a Beretta M1934 as her sidearm. She has the power to concentrate energy into a point in front of her and release it in a powerful burst. Working with her best friend Charlotte Yeager, who throws her, she can use this ability to deal severe damage to Neuroi.
Her Striker Unit is modeled after the Italian fighter, the Macchi C.202 Folgore.
(United States) Charlotte E. Yeager (シャーロット・E・イエーガー, Shārotto Ī Iēgā)
Voiced by: Ami Koshimizu (Japanese); Jamie Marchi (English)
Charlotte, also called "Shirley" (シャーリー, Shārī), is a 16-year-old Liberion Army Air Force pilot with the rank of Flight Lieutenant. Magnanimous, tall and buxom in appearance, Charlotte is a thrill-seeker who is obsessed with speed. In combat her armament can consist of an M1918 Browning Automatic Rifle, Thompson M1A1, MP 40, or Colt Government M1911 A1; she is also depicted carrying a Bowie knife; and it is revealed that she carries a Colt Single Action Army, which she gave to Barkhorn as a temporary sidearm in Strike Witches: Road to Berlin. Her magical ability allows her to enhance her Striker Unit's performance and increase her airspeed. Charlotte, like her namesake, becomes the first person to break the sound barrier. Before joining the 501st, she establishes herself as a motorcycle racer who breaks the land speed record at the Bonneville Salt Flats using a modified Indian motorcycle called "Rapid".
Her Striker Unit is modeled after the North American P-51D Mustang before being upgraded to an XP-51F variant in Strike Witches: Road to Berlin.
(Finland) Eila Ilmatar Juutilainen (エイラ・イルマタル・ユーティライネン, Eira Irumataru Yūtirainen)
Voiced by: Ayuru Ōhashi (Japanese); Caitlin Glass (English)
Eila is the 15-year-old top-ranking ace of the Suomus Air Force 24th Unit with the rank of Ensign. Eila's hobby is fortune-telling with tarot cards, although her predictions are sometimes questionable. She claims the magical power of seeing into the future, allowing her to evade incoming attacks with ease, and she is known for having never been shot down or even hit by enemy fire. Her relationship with Sanya remains ambiguous throughout the show, although outside the anime has repeatedly implied that the feelings are romantic at least from her side. In combat her weapons of choice are the MG42 and Suomi M1931 submachine gun. She has an older sister named Aurora E. Juutilainen.
Her Striker Unit seems to be modeled after the Messerschmitt Bf 109G variant as many of the Aust G variant was passed to the Finnish Air Force in real life during WW2 and saw extensive service till the end of war by the Finnish.
(Russia) Sanya V. Litvyak (サーニャ・V・リトヴャク, Sānya Bui Ritovyaku; Russian: Саня В. Литвяк)
Voiced by: Mai Kadowaki (Japanese); Jennifer Forrester (English)
Sanya, full name Alexandra Vladimirovna Litvyak (アレクサンドラ・ウラジミーロヴナ・リトヴャク, Arekusandora Urajimīrovuna Ritovyaku; Russian: Александра Владимировна Литвяк, Aleksandra Vladimirovna Litvyak), is the sole witch in the 501st from the Orussian Empire, and is 13 years old. Preferring to stay indoors during the day, Sanya has been described as "nocturnal." Despite this somewhat limiting her contact with the other members of the 501st, her low profile makes her ideal for night missions. Helping her in this duty is her magical specialty, the ability to read signals such as radio waves that are invisible to the naked eye, giving her an advanced spatial awareness. Sanya is the best friend of Eila, with whom they are incredibly close, and although she is less jealous as her friend, she still refers to her as beloved in one of "What if". Sanya holds the rank of Lieutenant, and her original unit affiliation is the Orussian Imperial Army 586th Fighter Regiment. Her weapon of choice is a modified Fliegerfaust called the "Fliegerhammer."
Her Striker Unit is modeled after the Soviet fighter plane, the MiG-3.
(Japan) Shizuka Hattori (服部 静夏, Hattori Shizuka)
Voiced by: Aya Uchida (Japanese); Cristina Valenzuela (English)
Shizuka is a 14-year-old witch from Fuso with the rank of Sergeant. In Strike Witches: The Movie, she is tasked with escorting Yoshika Miyafuji to a medical school in Helvetia. Having grown up in a military-oriented family, she admires other witches yet becomes bewildered by Yoshika, who does not act like her ideal soldier. Shizuka eventually comes to learn more about Yoshika's mentality, and when Yoshika is critically wounded during a Neuroi attack, Shizuka is able to reach the rest of the 501st, who help Yoshika regain her magic abilities. She officially joins the 501st in Strike Witches: Road to Berlin following Mio's departure from the front lines, and is promoted to Ensign.
Her Striker Unit is initially the standard Fuso Naval Witch Striker Unit, the Mitsubishi A6M "Zero", but in Strike Witches: Road to Berlin, she is assigned the newer Kawanishi N1K.

== Suomus Independent Volunteer Aerial Squadron ==
The characters appearing in the ongoing light novel are part of the Suomus Independent Volunteer Aerial Squadron (スオムス義勇独立飛行中隊, Suomusu Giyū Dokuritsu Hikō Chūtai).

(Japan) Tomoko Anabuki (穴拭 智子, Anabuki Tomoko)
Voiced by: Shimoji Shino (Japanese)
Tomoko is the protagonist of the light novel series. An ace dogfighter from the Fusō Empire stationed with the Fuso Imperial Army 1st Fighter Squadron, she rose to fame after the initial Neuroi probing attack in the Fusō sea in 1937, where she shot down 7 enemy fighters. She expected to get deployed to the frontlines in Karlsland but was ordered to Suomus instead.
Being from the land unit of the Fuso Empire, her Striker Unit was modeled after the Nakajima Ki-27 before switching to the more powerful Nakajima Ki-44 "Oscar".
(Japan) Haruka Sakomizu (迫水 ハルカ, Sakomizu Haruka)
Also from the Fusō Empire, Haruka's lineage were all previous accomplished witches and having seen actual witches being in combat during the Flash of the Fuso Sea incident, she decided to be a witch and went to the Fuso Imperial Navy Yokohama Flying Corps before being with the 507th for her witch training but had to drop out due to poor eyesights. She has to wear thick glasses in order to see properly but her low self-esteem causes her problems as he kept thinking that people would laugh and mock her for her thick glasses thus only wearing them during battles. She is enamored with Tomoko Anabuki and often fights for her affection with Giuseppina Cenni.
Like typical Fuso Naval witches, her Striker Unit was modeled after the Mitsubishi A6M "Zero"
(Canada) Elizabeth F. Beurling (エリザベス・F・ビューリング, Erizabesu Effu Byūringu)
Elizabeth is an insubordinate member of the Britannian Air Force. Considered to be a loose cannon, Elizabeth was to be executed for her constant insubordination and nature by the Britannian military brass. She is considered to have a gloomy personality with a slightly suicidal streak and often has a bit of a depressed side to her but shows supports for Tomoko Anabuki on her decisions in spite of her insubordinate personality. She has a close relationship with Hannah Rudel and Wilma Bishop who were drinking buddies. Elizabeth wields a Kukri in battle.
Being a Britannian Air Force witch, her Striker Unit was originally modeled after the Hawker Hurricane MK.II variant before switching to a Supermarine Spitfire Mk.V variant.
(United States) Katharine O'Hare (キャサリン・オヘア, Kyasarin Ohea)
Hailing from Texas in the United States of Liberion, Katherine was transferred after the Liberion Navy thought she could use some experience over at Sumous. Despite her inexperience she helps to do her best to keep her team in high spirits. Her inability to grasp other cultures may occasionally negate her efforts to befriend others.
Her initial Striker Unit was modeled after the F4F Wildcat but due to her consistent crashing, she was then given the older and tougher F2A Buffalo Striker Unit but with an upgraded engine to produce more horsepower and higher top speed
(Germany) Ursula Hartmann (ウルスラ・ハルトマン, Urusura Harutoman)
Voiced by: Sakura Nogawa (Japanese); Luci Christian (English)
Hailing from Karlsland, Ursula is the twin sister of the 501st's Erica Hartmann. The youngest in the squadron at 10 years of age, all she does is read and tries to learn everything according to Karlsland doctrines. She eventually uses her research into rocketry to design the Fliegerhammer prototype that Sanya will use. She also appears in some episodes of Strike Witches 2 and Strike Witches: Road to Berlin.
Ursula primarily uses two Striker Units modeled after two German aircraft which Karlsland is based upon, the Focke-Wulf Fw 190 and the Messerschmitt Bf 109.
(Finland) Elma Leivonen (エルマ・レイヴォネン, Eruma Reivonen)
A native of Suomus, Elma is nervous and inexperienced. Initially assigned as the squadron commander of the Suomus Independent Volunteer Air Squadron, she lacks initiative relinquishes her command of the force to Tomoko after the fall of Slussen.
Her Striker Unit was modeled after the Messerschmitt Bf 109E variant which was also given/bought by the real-life Finnish military from the Germans that Suomos is based upon.
(Italy) Giuseppina Cenni (ジュゼッピーナ・チュインニ, Juzeppīna Chuinni)
Nicknamed "Pasta Officer", Giuseppina is a member from the Principality of Romagna. A former top ace known as the "Non-commissioned General," she lost her memories and skills after being shot down over Neuroi territory and got brainwashed by the Neuroi. She managed to return to her unit on foot before being sent to Suomus for rehabilitation. Despite being dazed and often confused due to the brainwashing, she quickly got her abilities back and subsequent memories of what happened with her. She also realized together with the others in the 507th that the Neuroi was using downed witches and brainwashing them before allowing them to return to their unit as a sleeper agent so they could utilize these agents to copy the techniques the witches were using and train their own units to counter the witches's techniques. She has an infatuation with Tomoko and often fights with Haruka for her affection.
Her Striker Unit was modeled after the Italian Fiat G.50.

== 502nd Joint Fighter Wing ==
The 502nd Joint Fighter Wing (第502統合戦闘航空団, Daigōmaruni Tōgō Sentō Kōkū Dan), also known as the Brave Witches, who star in the Brave Witches anime series.

(Japan) Hikari Karibuchi (雁淵 ひかり, Karibuchi Hikari)
Voiced by: Ai Kakuma (Japanese); Madeleine Morris (English)
Hikari is the central heroine of Brave Witches who comes from Sasebo in Fuso who possesses huge amounts of stamina and strongly admires her sister, Takami. Initially volunteered to join the war effort and was sent to Suomus but after Takami ends up in a coma after using up all of her magical energy during the journey to their respective destination whilst fighting a Neuroi wave attack, Hikari instead volunteer to join the 502nd Joint Fighter Wing to fight in her place with the rank of Sergeant. Her weapons of choice are including a Type 99 cannon and a FP-45 Liberator.
Her Striker Unit was modeled after the Kawanishi N1K-J nicknamed "Chidori" which was inherited from her sister, Takami after Takami was rendered unable to fly due to suffering from a coma.
(Germany) Gundula Rall (グンドュラ・ラル, Gundura Raru)
Voiced by: Rina Satō (Japanese); Rachel Robinson (English)
Gundula is the squadron leader of the Brave Witches, known as Karlsland's (and the world's) first-ever ace and 3rd highest ranked ace overall after both Erica and Barkhorn overtook her tally. Gundula is holding the rank of Captain. Her combat weapons can be a MG 42 machine gun or StG-44 assault rifle.
Like typical Karlsland witches, her Striker Units were modeled after the Messerschmitt Bf 109 models with both her units being the K and G variants.
(Russia) Alexsandra Ivanovna Pokryshkin (アレクサンドラ・イワーノヴナ・ポクルイーシキン, Arekusandora Iwānovuna Pokuruīshikin)
Voiced by: Yumi Hara (Japanese); Monica Rial (English)
Alexsandra, nicknamed "Sasha", is the tactician of the Brave Witches and Orussia's top ranked ace with the rank of Captain. Her weapons of choice in combat are including PTRS-41 Anti-tank rifle and DP-28 machine gun.
(Germany) Waltrud Krupinski (ヴァルトルート・クルピンスキー, Varutorūto Kurupinsukī)
Voiced by: Kayo Ishida (Japanese); Felecia Angelle (English)
An easygoing veteran ace from Karlsland with the rank of Lieutenant, Waltrud is a hard-drinking womanizer with an optimist personality and considers both Barkhorn and Erica her good friends as they've served in JG52 together at the same time. In battle she's often carries a MG 42 machine gun or a StG-44 assault rifle that has been modified with an underbarrel Sturmpistole grenade launcher.
(Germany) Edytha Rossmann (エディータ・ロスマン, Edīta Rosuman)
Voiced by: Hiromi Igarashi (Japanese); Jill Harris (English)
Master sergeant Edytha is a veteran trainer with the rank of Master Sergeant who raised several talented witches, earning the nickname "Sensei". She was assigned to train Hikari after the former earned another chance to prove her worth. If deployed in combat she's often carries MG 42 or Fliegerhammer prototype rocket launcher similar to the one carried by Sanya V. Litvyak from the 501st.
(Finland) Nikka Edvardine Katajainen (ニッカ・エドワーディン・カタヤイネン, Nikka Edowādin Katayainen)
Voiced by: Natsumi Takamori (Japanese); Krystal LaPorte (English)
Nikka, or "Nipa", is a Suomus pilot with the rank of Master Sergeant who appears to be friends with fellow pilot Eila having both served in the same unit prior to joining the 501st and 502nd respectively. She's a very jovial person who often joke around with everyone and even have to step in to break up arguments between Kanno and Hikari. She has a habit of suffering misfortunes such as having crash landings and destroying her Striker Units. Her weapon of choice is a MG 42 machine gun.
Her Striker Unit, like other Suomus witches, was based on the Messerschmitt Bf 109G variant.
(France) Georgette Lemare (ジョーゼット・ルマール, Jōzetto Rumāru)
Voiced by: Haruka Terui (Japanese); Natalie Hoover (English)
Georgette is a Gallian witch with the rank of Sergeant capable of performing healing magic, as with Yoshika from the 501st. Being from a family that opens guesthouses, Georgette is great at doing housework and would often be seen going around the base and cleaning rooms for other witches in immaculate condition. She is shown to have a good palette and slight gluttony characteristic as she can be often seen tasting dishes for Sadako and often taking more portions for "tasting". Initially, she dodged Hikari anyway she could as she felt ashamed that she could not save Takami from peril but during one battle, she realized that Hikari did not blame her but instead thanked her as if she wasn't there to patch up Takami, Takami would have died on the ship and since then, Georgette has opened up to Hikari more. Her weapons of choice are including Britannian Bren or Orussian DP-28 machine guns.
Her Striker Unit was modeled after the Arsenal VG-33, a French light fighter.
(Japan) Naoe Kanno (管野 直枝, Kanno Naoe)
Voiced by: Rie Murakawa (Japanese); Mikaela Krantz (English)
Naoe is a witch from the Fuso Imperial Navy with the rank of Ensign capable of infusing magic on her right hand powerful enough to break through a Neuroi core and destroy it. She is an old friend of Takami, but upon learning that she got unconscious and Hikari was sent in her place, she hated Hikari for being weak which caused Takami to be injured and unable to fight alongside herself. However, after Hikari passes a difficult test as part of her training, Hikari earned Naoe's respect. The two would go on to become partners, and are able to fight together in perfect sync. When Kanno uses her powers, she gains the ears and tail of a Bulldog. Her main combat weapon is a Type 99 cannon.
Her Striker Unit is the same as the other Fuso Imperial Naval witches units modeled after the Mitsubishi A6M "Zero".
(Japan) Sadako Shimohara (下原 定子, Shimohara Sadako)
Voiced by: Marin Mizutani (Japanese); Dawn M. Bennett (English)
Sadako is a pilot from the Fuso Imperial Navy with the rank of Master Sergeant. Her ability enables her to spot objects beyond normal visual range and having a father who was a scientist, she could utilize normal objects and turn it into makeshift weapons to be used for offensive purposes. She has little experience in combat, but is the best in cooking and is the unit's chief cook. Her weapon of choice is a Type 99 cannon.
Like other Fuso Imperial Navy witches, her Striker Unit was modeled after the Mitsubishi A6M "Zero".
(Finland) Aurora E. Juutilainen (アウロラ・E・ユーティライネン, Aurora Ī Yūtirainen)
Aurora is a veteran ground witch from Suomus and Eila Ilmatar Juutilainen's older sister.
(Japan) Takami Karibuchi (雁淵 孝美, Karibuchi Takami)
Voiced by: Rie Suegara (Japanese); Amber Lee Connors (English)
Takami is Hikari's older sister who is also a member of the Third Squadron with the rank of Flight Lieutenant. She possesses a powerful technique called Absolute Eye which allows her to lock-on to multiple targets at once. However, as a result of using this technique against a group of Neuroi, Takami exhausts almost all of her magical energy and ends up in a coma. Her battle weapon is a Solothurn S-18/100 Anti-tank gun.

== 506th Joint Fighter Wing ==
The 506nd Joint Fighter Wing (第506統合戦闘航空団, Daigōmaruroku Tōgō Sentō Kōkū Dan), also known as the Noble Witches, unlike other JFWs, this Wing are separated into two units that were stationed in different bases, A-Unit in Sedan consisted of witches from many European and Fusoan nobilities and B-Unit in Dijon consisted of witches from Liberion, this arrangement was made as a compromise between European countries who believe that their nobilities are the important symbols for European reconstruction efforts and Liberion, a federal republic without any nobilities, but providing many needed materials and arms for said reconstruction efforts. They appear as cameos in the Strike Witches Movie and the main stars of Noble Witches: The 506th Joint Fighter Wing novel and manga series.

(Germany) Heinrike Prinzessin zu Sayn-Wittgenstein (ハインリーケ・プリンツェシン・ツー・ザイン・ウィトゲンシュタイン, Hainrīke Purintsueshin tsū Zain Uitogenshutain)
Voiced by: Ayako Kawasumi (Japanese); Rachel Robinson (English)
Heinrike is a Night Witch of the 506th Joint Fighter Wing, originating from Karlsland who is often referred to as 'Prinzessin' (princess) by other witches with many Liberion members of the 506th, Marian in particular, often using it in derogatory manners due to her long name and highly noble lineage. She believe that her duty as a noble and witch is to protect the weak and the meager, a belief that were ingrained in her younger years when she was captured by the bandits who were raiding the village near her family domain after trying to arrest them herself and learned that they're forced to resort to banditry after Neuroi invasion took everything from them. As with her fellow Karlsland's Night Witches and friend, Heidemarie, she carries a MG 151 cannon as her weapon and can also be seen brandishing a Beretta M1934 in the movie.
(Belgium) Rosalie De Hemricourt De Grunne (ロザリー・ド・エムリコート・ド・グリュンネ, Rozarī Do Emurikōto Do Guryun'ne)
Voiced by: Iori Nomizu (Japanese); Alison Viktorin (English)
Rosalie is a veteran Witch and honorary commander of the 506th Joint Fighter Wing's A-Unit, originating from Belgica and was attached in the Britannian Air Force after her country being overrun by the Neuroi. Although she's a capable commander, Rosalie often think herself to be unworthy for her current position and had considering for resigning multiple times which were always shot down by her subordinates.
(Italy) Adriana Visconti (アドリアーナ・ヴィスコンティ, Adoriāna Vuisukonti)
(Japan) Kunika Kuroda (黒田 那佳, Kuroda Kunika)
Voiced by: Nakamura Eriko (Japanese)
(Belgium) Isabelle du Monceau de Bergendal (イザベル・デュ・モンソオ・ド・バーガンデール, Izaberu deyu Monsoo do Bāgandēru)
Isabelle, often called "Isaac" (アイザック, Aizakku) by her friends, is a boyish-looking witch from a Belgican noble family, an avid reader and a known jokester among her peers. When she was first manifesting her Witch powers, her father, fearing she would be used by Belgican government for propaganda purpose, hid her gender from public knowledge, dressed her in boy's clothing and forbid her from leaving their mansion. Feeling dissatisfied with her sheltered life and wanted to see the world, she's escaped from her mansion and enrolled in Belgican Army Air Force. When Neuroi invaded Belgica, Isabelle alongside her family and many of her compatriots, were forced to evacuate to Britannia for safety, where she would later join the 506th after the liberation of Gallia. Her main combat weapon is a Boys anti-tank rifle.
(United States) Geena Preddy (ジーナ・プレディ, Jīna Puredi)
(United States) Marian E. Carl (マリアン・E・カール, Marian E Kāru)
Marian is a witch from Liberion Marine Corps and the Vice-Commanding Officer of 506th B-Unit. Hailing from a Hops farm in Hubbard, Oregon, she's the most vocal amongst her Liberion compatriot in voicing her resentment of the noble witches in the A-Unit, particularly Heinrike whom she shares a bad blood with after their first meeting when the former pretending to be the yet arrived Luksic after crash landed near B-Unit base and inardvertently revealed her hometown that she was ashamed of and tried to hide from her fellow Liberions, as she believes it to be a backward town where nobody could achieve their dreams. However, beneath all of her rough attitudes and dislikes to nobilities, she's also has a kind personalities and elegance that can be compared to one to the point where Heinrike herself was initially mistaken her to be a Liberion noble during their first meeting above. Her main weapon in combat is a Browning M1919A6 and her sidearm is a Colt M1911A1.
(United States) Jennifer J. DeBlanc (ジェニファー・J・デ・ブランク, Jenifā J De Buranku)
(United States) Carla J. Luksic (カーラ・J・ルクシック, Kāra J Rukushikku)
Carla is a Liberion witch who are known for her love for Cola drinks.

== Maidens of the Blue Sky ==
These witches mainly appear in the first manga and the PlayStation 2 video game.

(Japan) Amaki Suwa (諏訪 天姫, Suwa Amaki)
Voiced by: Kana Hanazawa (Japanese); Tia Ballard (English)
Amaki is a witch from the Fusō Empire who appears in episode 12 of the anime's first season. She gives Yoshika a letter from her father Dr. Ichirō Miyafuji.
(Japan) Nishiki Nakajima (中島 錦, Nakajima Nishiki)
Voiced by: Yuuko Sanpei (Japanese); Clarine Harp (English)
Nishiki is a witch from the Fuso Empire who is experienced and overly serious. Based on Ki-43. She appears in the manga and the last episode of Strike Witches 2.

== Maidens of the Heavens ==
These characters appear in the second manga.

(Japan) Junko Takei (竹井醇子, Takei Junko)
Voiced by: Masumi Asano (Japanese); Kara Edwards (English)
The leader of the 504th Joint Fighter Wing, the Ardor Witches. She also makes a few appearances in Strike Witches 2.
(Japan) Goshiki Suwa (諏訪五色, Suwa Goshiki)
The sister of Amaki Suwa.
(Japan) Hayate Nakajima (中島疾風, Nakajima Hayate)
Based on the WW2Japanese fighter aircraft, the Ki-84
(Japan) Kanesada Kuji (九字兼定, Kuji Kanesada)
A dog familiar who has resided inside a katana for a long time but is released when Yoshika goes near it. Whilst invisible to most people, certain witches such as Yoshika and Junko are able to see him.

== Sky That Connects Us ==
These characters are from other squadrons who appear in the Strike Witches 1.5 manga.

(Germany) Hanna-Justina Marseille (ハンナ・ユスティーナ・マルセイユ, Hanna Yusutīna Maruseiyu)
Voiced by: Shizuka Itō (Japanese); Colleen Clinkenbeard (English)
Marseille is the captain of the 31st Joint Fighter Wing known as the Storm Witches, stationed in Africa. She appears in the Strike Witches 1.5 manga and episode 10 of anime's second season. She is one of the more famous witches known throughout the world. She is initially in a Karlsland squad alongside Gertrud Barkhorn and Erica Hartmann. She has a competitive attitude and tries to motivate Erica, who she views as her equal. Her main armaments is a MG 34 machine gun.
(Canada) Wilma Bishop (ウィルマ・ビショップ, Wiruma Bishoppu)
Wilma is Lynette Bishop's older sister, who is a witch in the Farawayland Royal Air Force. She appears as a main protagonist in the One Winged Witches manga.
(France) Amelie Planchard (アメリー・プランシャール, Amerī Puranshāru)
Voiced by: Sayuri Yahagi (Japanese); Sarah Wiedenheft (English)
Amilie is a friend of Perrine Clostermann's from the Gallian Witches Army.
(Germany) Helma Lennartz (ヘルマ・レンナルツ, Heruma Rennarutsu)
Helma is a test pilot for the 131st Experimental Flight Regiment.
(Germany) Heidemarie W. Schnaufer (ハイデマリー・W・シュナウファー, Haidemarī Daburyū Shunaufā)
Voiced by: Kana Ueda (Japanese); Bryn Apprill (English)
Heidemarie is a lieutenant from the Karlsland Air Force 1st Night Fighter Wing. She has night vision powers, which she can use for nightly reconnaissance missions as with Sanya Litvyak. She defends an area alone and thus lacks social skills, sometimes being mistaken for a ghost. In the movie, Heidemarie assists the 501st upon their reunion. In combat she carries a MG 151 Autocannon as her main weapon.

== Neuroi ==
The Neuroi are an alien force that are the primary antagonists of Strike Witches. In order to gain Earth's power, they consume some of its continents where Europe and Africa are badly affected by their goals.

Each of the Neuroi come in different types:

- Neuroi Drones - Small drones that are launched in order to defend the larger Neuroi.
- Large-Type Neuroi - The standard flying class of the Neuroi and the most common of the group.
- Capital Neuroi - They are deployed for specific purposes.
- Heavy Neuroi - The ground-based counterparts of the Large-Type Neuroi.
- Ultra-Heavy Neuroi - The larger versions of the Heavy Neuroi which are the most difficult to destroy.
- Witch-Like Neuroi - The type of Neuroi that take the form of the Strike Witches and can mimic their abilities.
- Small and Medium-Type Neuroi - The type of Neuroi that are launched in large numbers to protect the Hive Neuroi.
- Hive Neuroi - The Hive Neuroi serve as the primary operating base of the Neuroi.
- Super-Hive Neuroi - A unique version of the Hive Neuroi that was in the airspace of Romagnan and Venezian in 1945.
- Nest Neuroi - The ground version of the Hive Neuroi.

== Other characters ==
(Japan) Michiko Yamakawa (山川 美千子, Yamakawa Michiko)
Voiced by: Arise Satō (Japanese); Katie Caruso (English)
Michiko is Yoshika Miyafuji's childhood friend who resides in Fusō.
(Germany) Christiane Barkhorn (クリスティアーネ・バルクホルン, Kurisutiāne Barukuhorun)
Voiced by: Asami Sanada (Japanese); Monica Rial (English)
Christiane, affectionately known as Chris (クリス, Kurisu), is Gertrud Barkhorn's younger sister who was severely injured during the Neuroi's invasion of Karlsland and was in a coma for most of the anime's first season. After waking up, she is constantly visited by her sister while recovering in the hospital.
(Japan) Ichirō Miyafuji (宮藤 一郎, Miyafuji Ichirō)
Voiced by: Hozumi Gōda (Japanese); John Burgmeier (English)
Ichirō is the father of Yoshika Miyafuji and a researcher who helps design the Striker Unit. He works alongside Mio before the beginning of the series. He is reportedly deceased, which surprises Yoshika when she starts receiving letters apparently from him.
(United Kingdom) Trevor Maloney (トレヴァー・マロニー, Torevā Maronī)
Voiced by: Yōsuke Akimoto (Japanese); Cole Brown (English)
Maloney is a general with authority over the Strike Witches. His true purpose is to find a way to order the dissolution of the witches and to implement his new weapon, the Warlock, which has been made using Neuroi technology. Maloney's plan fails when the Neuroi assimilates the Warlock, and he is captured by Minna-Dietlinde Wilcke and the other witches.
(Italy) Maria (マリア, Maria)
Voiced by: Madoka Yonezawa (Japanese); Brittney Karbowski (English)
Maria is a mysterious, cheerful girl who Francesca Lucchini saves from two sinister-looking men who appear to attack her in the streets of Rome. She states that she does not know the city very well, even though she says to have been born and raised there. Lucchini takes a liking to her and show her around. Maria is later revealed to be the Duchess Maria of Romagna.
(Italy) Luciana Mazzei (ルチアナ・マッツェイ, Ruchiana Mazzei)
Voiced by: Ryō Hirohashi (Japanese); Jasmine Mendigo (English)
Luciana is a Romagna witch who is quiet, reserved and gentle in nature. She is athletic and a good marksman. She is a member of the 504th Joint Fighter Wing and appeared in episode 12 of Strike Witches 2 and the Strike Witches movie.
(Italy) Martina Crespi (マルチナ・クレスピ, Maruchina Kuresupi)
Voiced by: Kaori Mizuhashi (Japanese); Alexis Tipton (English)
Martina is a member of the 504th Joint Fighter Wing and hails from a wealthy family from Southern Romagna. She is bright and sociable. She appeared in episode 12 of Strike Witches 2 and the Strike Witches movie.
(Italy) Fernandia Malvezzi (フェルナンディア・マルヴェッツィ, Ferunandia maruvu~ettsu~i)
Voiced by: Rika Morinaga (Japanese); Maxey Whitehead (English)
Fernandia is a Romagna witch originally assigned to the medical corp but has a strong desire to for combat. She is best friends with Martina and Luciana. Fernandia is head-strong, impulsive, and friendly. She appeared in episode 12 of Strike Witches 2 and the Strike Witches movie.
(Germany) Raisa Pöttgen (ライーサ・ペットゲン, Raīsa· pettogen)
Voiced by: Aiko Kusumi (Japanese); Amanda Doskocil (English)
Raisa, also known by her nickname Rai, is a Karlsland witch attached to the Storm Witches. She is artistic and designed the outfit emblem. Rai is from a well-to-do family. She is paired with Hanna Marseille who she has strong feelings toward. She has a brief appearance at the end of Strike Witches 2.
