= Wakana Maruoka =

Japanese voice actress (born 1995)

- 丸岡 和佳奈
- Born: 13 May 1995 (age 31)
- Occupations: Voice actress; singer
- Years active: 2018–present
- Employer: With Line
- Notable work: Rinze Morino in The Idolmaster Shiny Colors; Ireena Litz de Olhyde in The Greatest Demon Lord Is Reborn as a Typical Nobody; Sumire Kasahara in My Clueless First Friend; Yuki Suou in Alya Sometimes Hides Her Feelings in Russian; Gumi Tomosaka in Onegai AiPri

Wakana Maruoka (丸岡 和佳奈, Maruoka Wakana; born 13 May 1995) is a Japanese voice actress and singer affiliated with With Line. She is known for voicing Rinze Morino in The Idolmaster Shiny Colors, Ireena Litz de Olhyde in The Greatest Demon Lord Is Reborn as a Typical Nobody, Sumire Kasahara in My Clueless First Friend, Yuki Suou in Alya Sometimes Hides Her Feelings in Russian and Gumi Tomosaka in Onegai AiPri.

== Biography ==
Wakana Maruoka, a native of Tokyo, was born on 13 May 1995. She initially planned to work as a civil servant, but later decided to become a voice actress instead. She was educated at the Tokyo Seiyu Academy.

In March 2018, she was cast as Rinze Morino, one of five members of Hōkago Climax Girls, one of the few idol units within The Idolmaster Shiny Colors spin-off franchise. Since then, she has performed as a singer on several Idolmaster music releases, including Hōkago Climax Girls' 2018 single Yumesaki After School (which charted at #8 in the Oricon Singles Chart) and the 2022 single Synthe-Side 02 (which charted at #25 in the aforementioned chart). She later recalled in a 2022 interview with Da Vinci Web that while portraying Rinze, she initially "acted quietly while suppressing my emotions, but as [she] grew older, [her] emotions gradually came to the fore".

In December 2021, she was cast as Ireena Litz de Olhyde in The Greatest Demon Lord Is Reborn as a Typical Nobody. In January 2022, she began voicing Urara Yume, a character in the Magia Record event "Gray Revolution". In May 2022, she was cast as Lujei Piche in GrimGrimoire OnceMore, the 2022 remaster of the 2007 game GrimGrimoire. In February 2023, she was cast as Sumire Kasahara in My Clueless First Friend. In 2024, she was cast as Yuki Suou in Alya Sometimes Hides Her Feelings in Russian.

== Filmography ==
=== Anime television ===
2018

- Anima Yell!, student
- Gurazeni, announcer
- Harukana Receive, fan
- Rascal Does Not Dream, girl, student, schoolgirl

2019

- Actors: Songs Connection, prostitute
- B-Project, employee A
- Namu Amida Bu! Rendai Utena, announcer
- Stand My Heroes, girl

2020

- BanG Dream!, Roselia fan
- Sleepy Princess in the Demon Castle, maid

2021

- Visual Prison, fan

2022

- Girls' Frontline, Kawasaki
- The Greatest Demon Lord Is Reborn as a Typical Nobody, Ireena Litz de Olhyde
- World's End Harem, employee B

2023

- Apparently, Disillusioned Adventurers Will Save the World, girl
- My Clueless First Friend, Sumire Kasahara

2024

- Alya Sometimes Hides Her Feelings in Russian, Yuki Suou

2026

- Petals of Reincarnation, Haito Luo Buffett
- Playing Death Games to Put Food on the Table, Keito
- Onegai AiPri, Gumi Tomosaka
- I Want to End This Love Game, Wakana Asagi
- BanG Dream! Yume∞Mita, Bell

=== Anime film ===
2021

- 100 Nichi Go ni Shinu Wani

=== Video games ===
2018

- The Idolmaster Shiny Colors, Rinze Morino

2019

- Action Taimanin, Kana Shimanami
- Monster Strike, Aquamarine
- Quiz RPG: The World of Mystic Wiz, Angela

2020

- Hortensia Saga, Livia
- Touhou LostWord, Reimu Hakurei, Alice Margatroid

2021

- Kirara Fantasia, Miku Sōenji

2022

- Azur Lane, Leonardo da Vinci
- The DioField Chronicle, Rickenback Madea
- GrimGrimoire OnceMore, Lujei Piche
- Kemono Friends 3, Aotsura Katsuodori
- Magia Record, Urara Yume
