= My Clueless First Friend =

Japanese manga series

- First tankōbon volume cover

事情を知らない転校生がグイグイくる。 (Jijō o Shiranai Tenkōsei ga Guigui Kuru)
- Genre: Comedy, slice of life
- Manga
- Written by: Taku Kawamura
- Published by: Square Enix
- English publisher: NA: Square Enix Manga & Books
- Imprint: Gangan Comics Joker
- Magazine: Monthly Gangan Joker
- Original run: May 22, 2018 – present
- Volumes: 25
- Anime television series
- Directed by: Shigenori Kageyama
- Produced by: Tomoko Fujimura; Emiko Iijima; Natsuko Kawasaki; Youhei Kikuchi; Atsushi Nagashima; Katsunori Narumo; Shinji Oomori; Tomoko Shibuya; Osamu Shimizu; Yousuke Tamura
- Written by: Takafumi Hoshikawa; Shogo Yasukawa
- Music by: Toshio Masuda
- Studio: Studio Signpost
- Licensed by: Crunchyroll
- Original network: Tokyo MX, ytv, TVA, BS Fuji, Animax
- Original run: April 9, 2023 – July 2, 2023
- Episodes: 13
- icon

My Clueless First Friend (Japanese: 事情を知らない転校生がグイグイくる。, Hepburn: Jijō o Shiranai Tenkōsei ga Guigui Kuru; lit. 'The Clueless Transfer Student Is Assertive') is a Japanese manga series written and illustrated by Taku Kawamura. It has been serialized in Square Enix's shōnen manga magazine Monthly Gangan Joker since May 2018, with its chapters collected in 25 tankōbon volumes as of November 2026. An anime television series adaptation produced by Studio Signpost aired from April to July 2023.

== Synopsis ==
Akane Nishimura is a quiet, almost goth-like, girl who everyone nicknames "Grim Reaper" due to the way she looks. When a boy named Taiyō Takada first enters the class, he obliviously chooses to become friends with Akane and together form a friendship that will forever change both of their lives.

== Characters ==
Akane Nishimura (西村 茜, Nishimura Akane)
Voiced by: Konomi Kohara (Japanese); Molly Zhang (English)
Taiyō Takada (高田 太陽, Takada Taiyō)
Voiced by: Shizuka Ishigami (Japanese); Madeleine Morris (English)
Daichi Hino (日野 大地, Hino Daichi)
Voiced by: Kengo Kawanishi (Japanese); Belsheber Rusape (English)
Umi Adachi (安達 海美, Adachi Umi)
Voiced by: Reina Kondō (Japanese); Dani Chambers (English)
Yukiko Takada (高田 雪子, Takada Yukiko)
Voiced by: Atsumi Tanezaki (Japanese); Marisa Duran (English)
Sumire Kasahara (笠原 すみれ, Kasahara Sumire)
Voiced by: Wakana Maruoka (Japanese); Lindsay Sheppard (English)
Kotarō Kitagawa (北川 虎太郎, Kitagawa Kotarō)
Voiced by: Kōhei Amasaki (Japanese); Kyle Igneczi (English)
Akane's Dad (茜の父, Akane no Chichi)
Voiced by: Jun Fukuyama (Japanese); Alex Hom (English)

== Media ==
=== Manga ===
Written and illustrated by Taku Kawamura, My Clueless First Friend started in Square Enix's shōnen manga magazine Monthly Gangan Joker on May 22, 2018. Square Enix has collected its chapters into individual tankōbon volumes. The first volume was released on October 22, 2018. As of November 20, 2026, 25 volumes have been released.

In July 2022, Square Enix Manga & Books announced that they had licensed the manga for English release in North America. The series is also published online on the English version of Square Enix's Manga Up! platform since July 2022.

==== Volumes ====
No.	Original release date	Original ISBN	English release date	English ISBN
1	October 22, 2018	978-4-7575-5855-7	March 7, 2023	978-1-64609-204-8
Chapters 1–18; Bonus Chapter
2	February 22, 2019	978-4-7575-6025-3	March 7, 2023	978-1-64609-204-8
Chapters 19–29; Bonus Chapter
3	June 22, 2019	978-4-7575-6167-0	June 6, 2023	978-1-64609-205-5
Chapters 30–40; Bonus Chapter
4	October 21, 2019	978-4-7575-6352-0	June 6, 2023	978-1-64609-205-5
Chapters 41–50; Bonus Chapter
5	February 22, 2020	978-4-7575-6529-6	September 5, 2023	978-1-64609-207-9
Chapters 51–60; Bonus Chapter
6	June 22, 2020	978-4-7575-6708-5	September 5, 2023	978-1-64609-207-9
Chapters 61–74; Bonus Chapter
7	November 21, 2020	978-4-7575-6948-5	December 5, 2023	978-1-64609-208-6
Chapters 75–84; Bonus Chapter 1; Chapters 85–87; Bonus Chapter 2
8	March 22, 2021	978-4-7575-7162-4	December 5, 2023	978-1-64609-208-6
Chapters 88–99; Bonus Chapter
9	July 20, 2021	978-4-7575-7375-8	March 5, 2024	978-1-64609-209-3
Chapters 100–112; Bonus Chapter
10	November 22, 2021	978-4-7575-7576-9	March 5, 2024	978-1-64609-209-3
Chapters 113–124; Bonus Chapter
11	March 22, 2022	978-4-7575-7825-8	June 11, 2024	978-1-64609-227-7
Chapters 125–134; Bonus Chapter
12	July 22, 2022	978-4-7575-8035-0	June 11, 2024	978-1-64609-227-7
Chapters 135–140; Bonus Chapter
13	November 22, 2022	978-4-7575-8263-7	September 3, 2024	978-1-64609-260-4
Chapters 141–147; Bonus Chapter
14	March 22, 2023	978-4-7575-8476-1	September 3, 2024	978-1-64609-260-4
Chapters 148–160; Bonus Chapter
15	July 22, 2023	978-4-7575-8672-7	January 7, 2025	978-1-64609-314-4
Chapters 161–165; Bonus Chapter
16	November 21, 2023	978-4-7575-8905-6	January 7, 2025	978-1-64609-314-4
Chapters 166–173; Bonus Chapter
17	March 22, 2024	978-4-7575-9114-1	August 11, 2026	978-1-64609-431-8
Chapters 174–181; Bonus Chapter
18	July 22, 2024	978-4-7575-9325-1	August 11, 2026	978-1-64609-431-8
Chapters 182–187; Bonus Chapter
19	November 21, 2024	978-4-7575-9520-0	—	—
Chapters 188–191; Bonus Chapter
20	March 22, 2025	978-4-7575-9759-4	—	—
Chapters 192–201; Bonus Chapter
21	July 22, 2025	978-4-7575-9963-5	—	—
Chapters 202–210; Bonus Chapter
22	November 20, 2025	978-4-301-00174-4	—	—
Chapters 211–218; Bonus Chapter
23	March 21, 2026	978-4-301-00400-4	—	—
Chapters 219–223; Bonus Chapter
24	July 22, 2026	978-4-301-00646-6	—	—
Chapters 224–234; Bonus Chapter
25	November 20, 2026	978-4-301-00891-0	—	—
Chapters 235–241; Bonus Chapter

=== Anime ===
In November 2022, it was announced that the manga would receive an anime television series adaptation. It is produced by Studio Signpost and directed by Shigenori Kageyama, with scripts written by Takafumi Hoshikawa and Shogo Yasukawa, character designs handled by Chikashi Kadekaru, and music composed by Toshio Masuda. The series aired from April 9 to July 2, 2023, on Tokyo MX and other networks. The opening theme song, "Alcor to Polaris" (アルコルとポラリス, Arukoru to Porarisu; lit. 'Alcor and Polaris'), is performed by Reina Kondō, while the ending theme song, "Kokorone" (ココロネ), is performed by Kitri. Crunchyroll is streaming the series.

==== Episodes ====
No.	Title	Directed by	Written by	Storyboarded by	Original release date (Note: Episodes are released on select platforms (such as ABEMA and Crunchyroll) a week before their air dates on television.)
1	"The Grim Reaper and the Transfer Student"; Transliteration: "Shinigami to Tenkōsei" (Japanese: 死神と転校生)	Taiji Kawanishi	Shogo Yasukawa	Mizuki Aoba	April 9, 2023
2	"Lunch Duty and Ghost Photographs and Love Letters"; Transliteration: "Kyūshoku Tōban to Shinrei Shashin to Rabu Retā" (Japanese: 給食当番と心霊写真とラブレター)	Yūki Morita	Tsuma Sawaki	Naotaka Hayashi	April 16, 2023
3	"Summer Vacation Begins"; Transliteration: "Natsuyasumi ga Hajimaru" (Japanese: 夏休みがはじまる)	Chika Nenbe	Masaya Honda	Meigo Naitō	April 23, 2023
4	"Grandma's House"; Transliteration: "Obāchan-chi" (Japanese: おばあちゃんち)	Hisanori Kobayashi, Kazuho Kunimoto	Shogo Yasukawa	Mizuki Aoba	April 30, 2023
5	"Call Me the Grim Reaper"; Transliteration: "Shinigami tte Yonde" (Japanese: 死神って呼んで)	Fumio Maezono	Tsuma Sawaki	Meigo Naitō	May 7, 2023
6	"Changing Desks, Class Reps, and New Friends"; Transliteration: "Sekigae to Kurasu Iin to Atarashii Tomodachi" (Japanese: 席替えとクラス委員と新しいともだち)	Masayuki Matsumoto	Yuki Tanihata	Mizuki Aoba	May 14, 2023
7	"Field Trips and the Magic of Marinated Eggs"; Transliteration: "Ensoku to Ajitama no Mahō" (Japanese: 遠足と味玉の魔法)	Taiji Kawanishi	Masaya Honda	Meigo Naitō	May 21, 2023
8	"Yukata, Jungle Gyms, and Orthopedic Casts"; Transliteration: "Yukata to Janguru Jimu to Gipusu" (Japanese: 浴衣とジャングルジムとギプス)	Chika Nenbe, Yoshitsugu Kimura, Takahiro Suzuura, Tsurugi Harada	Tsuma Sawaki	Toshihiko Masuda	May 28, 2023
9	"Run! Shout! Field Day"; Transliteration: "Hashire! Sakebe! Undōkai" (Japanese: 走れ！叫べ！運動会)	Natsumi Yasue	Shogo Yasukawa	Mizuki Aoba	June 4, 2023
10	"My First Time Having Guests Over"; Transliteration: "Hajimete no Omotenashi" (Japanese: 初めてのおもてなし)	Tsurugi Harada	Yuki Tanihata	Meigo Naitō	June 11, 2023
11	"The Swift Reaper Alliance, the Cursed Song, and Christmas"; Transliteration: "Fūjin Dōmei to Noroi no Uta to Kurisumasu" (Japanese: 風神同盟と呪いの歌とクリスマス)	Yūki Morita	Shogo Yasukawa, Tsuma Sawaki	Miyuki Fujimori	June 18, 2023
12	"The Christmas Party Confession"; Transliteration: "Kurisumasu Pātī no Kokuhaku" (Japanese: クリスマスパーティーの告白)	Taiji Kawanishi	Shogo Yasukawa	Mizuki Aoba	June 25, 2023
13	"10 Years Later, the Same as Today"; Transliteration: "Jūnengo mo, Kyō mo" (Japanese: 10年後も、今日も)	Maki Kamiya	Yuki Tanihata	Meigo Naitō	July 2, 2023

== Reception ==
The series was ranked thirteenth in the 2020 edition of Takarajimasha's Kono Manga ga Sugoi! list of the best manga for male readers.

== See also ==
- False Child, another manga series by Taku Kawamura
