= Madeleine Morris =

American voice actress

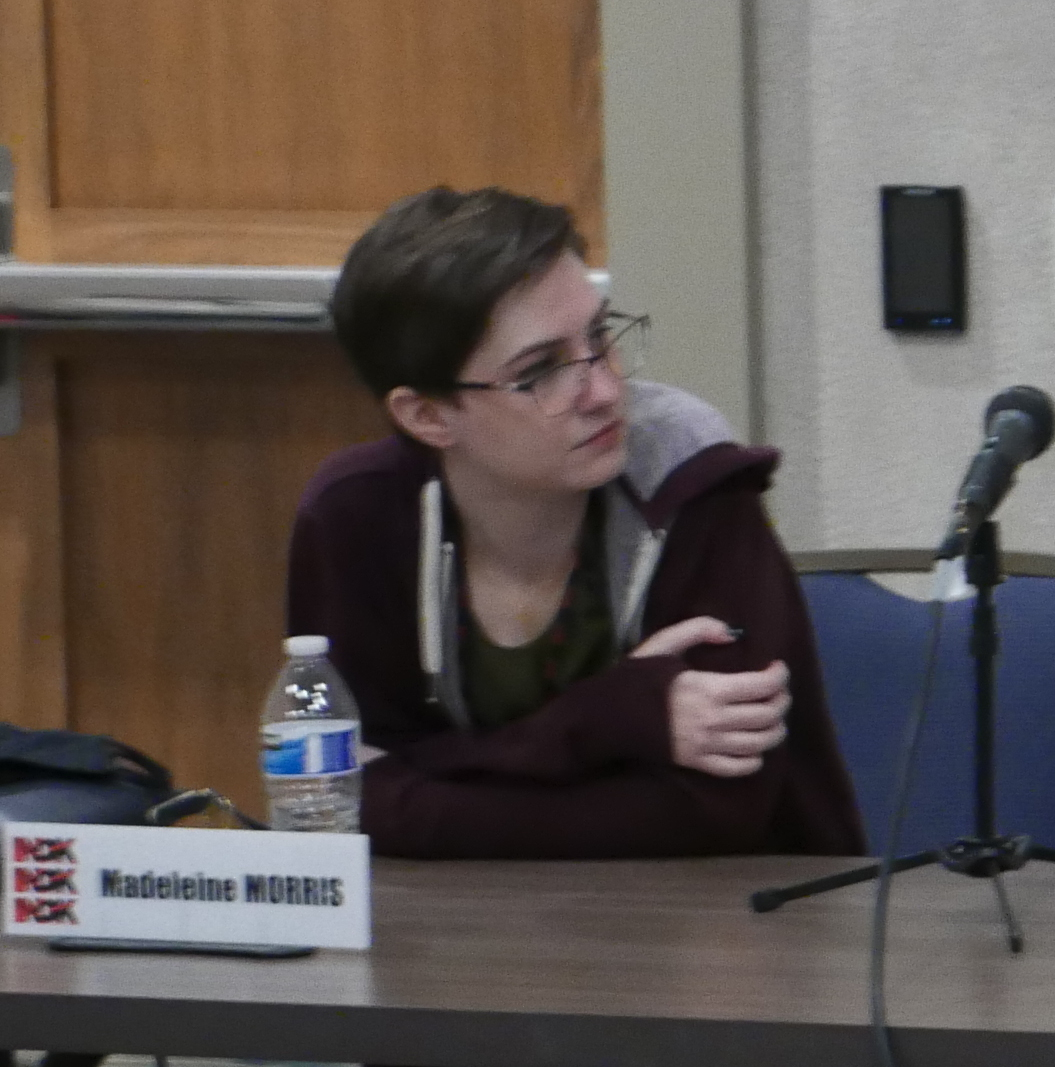
- Morris at Nan Desu Kan 2021
- Born: March 29, 1992 (age 34)
- Occupation: Voice actress
- Years active: 2016–present
- Website: www.madeleinemorris.actor

Madeleine Morris (born March 29, 1992) is an American voice actress and writer, known for her work on English anime dubs.

== Filmography ==
=== Film ===
Voice performances in films
| Year | Title | Role | Ref. |
|---|---|---|---|
| 2017 | One Piece Film: Gold | Stella | |
| 2022 | The House of the Lost on the Cape | Yui | |

=== Anime ===
Voice performances in anime
| Year | Title | Role | Notes | Ref. |
|---|---|---|---|---|
| 2016 | Three Leaves, Three Colors | Sasame Tsuji, Lakshmi | | |
| 2016 | Love Live! Sunshine!! | Itsuki | | |
| 2016 | Izetta: The Last Witch | Bianca | | |
| 2016 | Keijo!!!!!!!! | Nami Nanase | | |
| 2017 | Aria the Scarlet Ammo AA | Akari Mamiya | | |
| 2017 | ACCA: 13-Territory Inspection Dept. | Locustella | | |
| 2017 | KanColle – Kantai Collection | Ooyodo | | |
| 2017 | Attack on Titan | Nifa | | |
| 2017 | Seven Mortal Sins | Maria | | |
| 2017 | Alice & Zoroku | Noriko Yamada | | |
| 2017 | Brave Witches | Flight Sergeant Hikari Karibuchi | Lead character | |
| 2017 | Tsugumomo | Eiko | | |
| 2017 | Hyouka | Eru Chitanda | | |
| 2017 | Tsuredure Children | Nanase | | |
| 2017 | Hina Logic – from Luck & Logic | Mahiro | | |
| 2017 | New Game!! | Hotaru Hoshikawa | Season 2 | |
| 2017 | Dies irae | Kasumi | | |
| 2017 | Garo: Vanishing Line | Sophie | | |
| 2018 | My Hero Academia | Yui Kodai, Komari Ikoma | | |
| 2018 | Dances with the Dragons | Arzel | | |
| 2018 | Aokana - Four Rhythms Across the Blue | Madoka Aoyagi | | |
| 2018 | Magical Girl Raising Project | Fav | | |
| 2018 | Lord of Vermilion: The Crimson King | Akira | | |
| 2018 | Harukana Receive | Ai Tanahara | | |
| 2018 | Hanebado! | Misato | | |
| 2018 | How Not to Summon a Demon Lord | Krebskulm/Klem | | |
| 2018 | Tokyo Ghoul:re | Chie Hori, Maris Stella | also Season 2 | |
| 2018 | SSSS.Gridman | Sayaka, Kena | | |
| 2018 | Ulysses: Jeanne d'Arc and the Alchemist Knight | Richemont | | |
| 2018 | Double Decker! Doug & Kirill | Sophie | | |
| 2018 | Ace Attorney | Viola | Season 2 | |
| 2018 | Zombie Land Saga | Maria Amabuki | Also Revenge | |
| 2019 | Meiji Tokyo Renka | Mei | Lead character | |
| 2019 | Boogiepop and Others | Kyouko | 2 episodes | |
| 2019 | The Morose Mononokean | Ashiya (Young) | | |
| 2019 | Mix | Haruka | | |
| 2019 | Wise Man's Grandchild | Lyn | | |
| 2019 | Kochoki | Oda Hidetaka | | |
| 2019 | Sarazanmai | Kazuki Yasaka (young) | | |
| 2019 | How Heavy Are the Dumbbells You Lift? | Hibiki Sakura | Lead character | |
| 2019 | Nichijou - My Ordinary Life | Misato Tachibana | | |
| 2019 | Kemono Friends | Common Raccoon | | |
| 2019 | After School Dice Club | Midori Ono | | |
| 2019 | Azur Lane | Javelin | | |
| 2019 | Stars Align | Kei Takada | | |
| 2019 | Cautious Hero: The Hero Is Overpowered but Overly Cautious | Rosalie Roseguard | | |
| 2020 | Asteroid in Love | Moe "Suzu" Suzuya | | |
| 2020 | She and Her Cat -Everything Flows- | Miyu | Lead character | |
| 2020 | Smile Down the Runway | Sara | | |
| 2020 | Fire Force | Inca Kasugatani | | |
| 2020 | Kaguya-sama: Love Is War? | Miko Iino | | |
| 2020 | Plunderer | Erin | | |
| 2020 | Assault Lily Bouquet | Moyu Mashima | ADR scriptwriter | |
| 2021 | Mushoku Tensei: Jobless Reincarnation | Rudeus Greyrat | Lead character | |
| 2021 | Kemono Jihen | Kabane | Lead character | |
| 2021 | The Dungeon of Black Company | Shia | | |
| 2021 | My Senpai Is Annoying | Mona Tsukishiro | | |
| 2021 | Otherside Picnic | Sorawo Kamikoshi | Lead character | |
| 2021 | How a Realist Hero Rebuilt the Kingdom | Carla Vargas | | |
| 2021 | Seirei Gensouki: Spirit Chronicles | Christina Beltrum, Flora Beltrum, Masato Sendo | | |
| 2022 | My Dress-Up Darling | Daia | | |
| 2022 | Kaguya-sama: Love Is War – Ultra Romantic | Miko Iino | | |
| 2022 | Girlfriend, Girlfriend | Nagisa Minase | ADR scriptwriter | |
| 2023 | Heavenly Delusion | Kuku | ADR lead adapter | |
| 2023 | My Clueless First Friend | Takada | | |
| 2023 | Frieren: Beyond Journey's End | Kanne | | |
| 2024 | Delico's Nursery | Raphael | | |
| 2024 | One Piece | Vegapunk Lilith | | |
| 2024 | After-School Hanako-kun Season 2 | Mokke B | | |
| 2025 | Zenshu | Natsuko Hirose | Lead character | |
| 2025 | Dealing with Mikadono Sisters Is a Breeze | Niko | | |
| 2025 | To Be Hero X | Pomelo | | |
| 2026 | Witch Hat Atelier | Agott | | |

=== Video games ===
Voice performances in video games
| Year | Title | Role | Ref. |
|---|---|---|---|
| 2019 | Borderlands 3 | Juno | |
| 2026 | Fire Emblem: Fortune's Weave | Tialla | |
