= The Greatest Demon Lord Is Reborn as a Typical Nobody =

Japanese light novel series and its adaptations

- First light novel volume cover, featuring Ginny Fin de Salvan (left), Ard Meteor (center), and Ireena Litz de Olhyde (right)

史上最強の大魔王、村人Aに転生する (Shijō Saikyō no Daimaō, Murabito Ē ni Tensei Suru)
- Genre: Heroic fantasy
- Novel series
- Written by: Myōjin Katō
- Published by: Shōsetsuka ni Narō
- Original run: August 2017 – May 2022
- Light novel
- Written by: Myōjin Katō
- Illustrated by: Sao Mizuno
- Published by: Fujimi Shobo
- English publisher: NA: Yen Press
- Imprint: Fujimi Fantasia Bunko
- Original run: May 19, 2018 – May 20, 2022
- Volumes: 10 (Note: + 1 short story collection)
- Manga
- Written by: Myōjin Katō
- Illustrated by: Misuho Kotoba
- Published by: Square Enix
- English publisher: NA: Comikey
- Magazine: Monthly Big Gangan
- Original run: February 25, 2019 – July 25, 2022
- Volumes: 7
- Anime television series
- Directed by: Mirai Minato
- Produced by: Takaaki Koyama; Naruki Fukaya; Chiaki Kurakane; Nobuhiko Kurosu; Hajime Maruyama; Mitsuhiro Ogata; Chiho Shibayama; Terushige Yoshie; Hideu Okazaki
- Written by: Michiko Yokote
- Music by: Takeshi Nakatsuka
- Studio: Silver Link; Blade
- Licensed by: Crunchyroll (streaming); SA/SEA: Muse Communication
- Original network: AT-X, Tokyo MX, BS NTV, KBS Kyoto, SUN
- Original run: April 6, 2022 – June 22, 2022
- Episodes: 12
- icon

The Greatest Demon Lord Is Reborn as a Typical Nobody (史上最強の大魔王、村人Aに転生する, Shijō Saikyō no Daimaō, Murabito Ē ni Tensei Suru; "The Greatest Demon Lord in the History Is Reincarnated as Villager A") is a Japanese light novel series written by Myōjin Katō and illustrated by Sao Mizuno. It began serialization online in August 2017 on the user-generated novel publishing website Shōsetsuka ni Narō. It was later acquired by Fujimi Shobo, who have published the series since May 2018 under their Fujimi Fantasia Bunko imprint. The light novel is licensed in North America by Yen Press. A manga adaptation with art by Misuho Kotoba was serialized in Square Enix's seinen manga magazine Monthly Big Gangan from February 2019 to July 2022. The manga is licensed digitally in North America by Comikey. An anime television series adaptation produced by Silver Link and Blade aired from April to June 2022.

== Plot ==
The Demon Lord Varvatos is bored and isolated by his vast power and lack of challenges, so he commits suicide, intending to eventually reincarnate as an average boy. 3,000 years later, he reincarnates as the human Ard Meteor, though he is still extraordinarily powerful and retains knowledge of ancient magic lost to history. After befriending the elf Ireena Litz de Olhyde, they join the Academy of Magic. After he rescues the succubus Ginny Fin de Salvan, they form a team and go on adventures while Ireena and Ginny compete for Ard's affections.

== Characters ==
Ard Meteor (アード・メテオール, Ādo Meteōru)
Voiced by: Toshinari Fukamachi, Rie Takahashi (young) (Japanese); Nazeeh Tarsha, Ciarán Strange (young) (English)
A reincarnated Demon Lord named Varvatos who existed 3,000 years prior to the start of the series.
Ireena Litz de Olhyde (イリーナ・リッツ・ド・オールハイド, Irīna Rittsu do Ōruhaido)
Voiced by: Wakana Maruoka (Japanese); Trisha Mellon, Meg McClain (young) (English)
An elf girl who is the first friend of Ard.
Ginny Fin de Salvan (ジニー・フィン・ド・サルヴァン, Jinī Fin do Saruvan)
Voiced by: Hina Yōmiya (Japanese); Bryn Apprill (English)
A young succubus who gets bullied a lot. She worships Ard after he comes to her rescue.
Sylphy Marheaven (シルフィー・メルヘヴン, Shirufī Meruhevun)
Voiced by: Ayaka Ōhashi (Japanese); Reshel Mae (English)
A soldier in the Demon Lord's Army formerly known as Raging Champion (激動の勇者, Reijingu Chanpion).
Olivia vel Vine (オリヴィア・ヴェル・ヴァイン, Orivia veru Vain)
Voiced by: Mie Sonozaki (Japanese); Kasi Hollowell (English)
One of the Four Heavenly Kings and Varvatos's adopted sister.
Varvatos (ヴァルヴァトス, Varuvatosu)
Voiced by: Kōhei Amasaki
The Demon Lord who defeated the Evil Gods and united the world. He chooses to reincarnate three thousand years into the future due to the loneliness brought about by his overwhelming power.
Lydia Beginsgate (リディア・ビギンズゲート, Ridia Biginzugēto)
Voiced by: Yuki Kaida (Japanese); Corey Pettit (English)
One of the Four Heavenly Kings, Varvatos's lover, and Sylphy's sister.
Verda El Hazard (ヴェーダ・アル・ハザード, Vēda Aru Hazādo)
Voiced by: Yui Ogura (Japanese); Veronica Laux (English)
A former member of the Four Heavenly Kings. She is a magical scholar who works at the research institute in the ancient capital, Kingsglaive.
Alvarto Exex (アルヴァート・エグゼクス, Aruvāto Eguzekusu)
Voiced by: Takehito Koyasu (Japanese); James Cheek (English)
One of the Four Heavenly Kings. According to Ard, in power, he is the strongest member of the Heavenly Kings.
Lizer Bellphoenix (ライザー・ベルフェニックス, Raizā Berufenikkusu)
Voiced by: Kenta Miyake

== Media ==
=== Light novel ===
The light novel series is written by Myōjin Katō and illustrated by Sao Mizuno. It began serialization online in August 2017 on the user-generated novel publishing website Shōsetsuka ni Narō. It was later acquired by Fujimi Shobo, who have published ten volumes since May 2018 under their Fujimi Fantasia Bunko imprint. It is licensed in English by Yen Press.

No.	Title	Original release date	English release date
1	The Myth-Killing Honor Student; Shinwa-goroshi no yūtōsei (神話殺しの優等生)	May 19, 2018; 978-4-04072-682-3	November 26, 2019; 978-1-97530-568-0
2	The Raging Champion; Gekidō no yūsha (激動の勇者)	July 20, 2018; 978-4-04072-690-8	February 11, 2020; 978-1-97530-570-3
3	The Catastrophe of the Great Hero; Dai eiyū no katasutorofi (大英雄のカタストロフィ)	November 20, 2018; 978-4-04072-965-7	July 21, 2020; 978-1-97531-274-9
4	The Lonely Divine Scholar; Kodoku no shingaku-sha (孤独の神学者)	April 20, 2019; 978-4-04072-966-4	October 20, 2020; 978-1-97531-276-3
5	Papal Baptism; Kyoukou Senrei (教皇洗礼)	August 20, 2019; 978-4-04073-231-2 (regular edition); 978-4-04073-230-5 (special edition)	February 23, 2021; 978-1-97531-502-3
6	Former Typical Nobody; Moto Murabito ē (元・村人A)	January 18, 2020; 978-4-04073-433-0	June 22, 2021; 978-1-97531-650-1
SP	The Wonderful Life of a Typical Nobody; Murabito ē no kareinaru hibi (村人Aの華麗なる日々)	January 18, 2020; 978-4-04073-435-4	November 16, 2021; 978-1-97532-539-8
7	Clown of the Outer Gods; Sotonarukami no piero (外なる神のピエロ)	November 20, 2020; 978-4-04073-434-7	March 29, 2022; 978-1-97533-431-4
8	Goddess Awakening; Megami no kakusei (女神の覚醒)	April 20, 2021; 978-4-04074-068-3	August 16, 2022; 978-1-97534-200-5
9	Dream of the Evil God; Jashin no yume (邪神の夢)	March 19, 2022; 978-4-04074-391-2	February 20, 2024; 978-1-97537-013-8
10	Advent of the Great Demon King; Daimaō Kōrin (大魔王降臨)	May 20, 2022; 978-4-04074-392-9	June 18, 2024; 978-1-97537-015-2

=== Manga ===
A manga adaptation with art by Misuho Kotoba was serialized in Square Enix's seinen manga magazine Monthly Big Gangan from February 25, 2019, to July 25, 2022. Seven tankōbon volumes have been released as of September 2022. The manga is licensed digitally in North America by Comikey.

No.	Japanese release date	Japanese ISBN
1	August 9, 2019	978-4-75756-245-5
2	February 12, 2020	978-4-75756-523-4
3	August 15, 2020	978-4-75756-815-0
4	February 15, 2021	978-4-75757-117-4
5	September 25, 2021	978-4-75757-492-2
6	March 25, 2022	978-4-75757-844-9
7	September 24, 2022	978-4-75758-164-7

=== Anime ===
An anime adaptation was announced at the "Kadokawa Light Novel Expo 2020" event on March 6, 2021. The television series is produced by Silver Link and Blade and directed by Mirai Minato, with Michiko Yokote writing the series' scripts, Takayuki Noguchi adapting Sao Mizuno's character designs for animation, and Takeshi Nakatsuka composing the music. It aired from April 6 to June 22, 2022, on AT-X, Tokyo MX, BS NTV, KBS Kyoto, and SUN. The opening theme is "Be My Friend!!!" by Ayaka Ōhashi, while the ending theme is "reincarnation" by ChouCho. Crunchyroll streamed the series. Muse Communication licensed the series in South and Southeast Asia.

On April 11, 2022, Crunchyroll announced that the series will receive an English dub, which premiered on April 20.

No.	Title	Directed by	Written by	Storyboarded by	Original release date
1	"Typical Nobody"; Transliteration: "Murabito Ē" (Japanese: 村人A)	Mirai Minato	Michiko Yokote	Kubo Shiba	April 6, 2022
The sorcerer Varvatos has grown too powerful and is no longer recognized as human. With no one who can understand him he decides to reincarnate as an average boy. Reborn as Ard Meteor he hopes to live an ordinary life. Unfortunately magical power and education has declined so while his powers would be considered average in the past in the present he is once again the strongest warrior and sorcerer. Reaching 10 years old Ard hopes to make a friend, but his past as the terrifying Demon Lord means he has no social skills and is seen as creepy by other children. Mayor Olhyde, friend to Ard's parents, worries his daughter Ireena has become withdrawn after being bullied by her friends for her elf heritage. Ard finds Ireena using magic and offers to teach her, but she runs away. Realizing she is Olhyde's daughter Ard persists in trying to be friends with Ireena. Goblins escape a nearby dungeon and attack Ireena while she is alone in the mountains but Ard saves her. Ireena decides to trust Ard who is happy he finally made a friend. Several years later, as teenagers and best friends, Ireena suggests they join the Academy of Magic.
2	"Non-Standard"; Transliteration: "Kikaku-gai" (Japanese: 規格外)	Toshiyuki Sone	Michiko Yokote	Miyana Okita	April 13, 2022
Headmaster Golde immediately enrolls Ard and Ireena as they are the children of the three great heroes, Olhyde, and Ard's parents Jack and Carla. Ireena protects a succubus named Ginny from Eraldo Spencer, son of a Duke whom Ginny's family are servants to, and he challenges Ard to duel. Their instructor is Lady Olivia, one of Ard's generals from his previous life. Ard decides to hide his past as Varvatos in case she is angry he left to reincarnate. During their duel Ard realizes Eraldo has been hiding his ordinary magical abilities behind impressive spell names and defeats him. Olivia is suspicious of Ard over his use of Lost Skills unseen since Demon Lord Varvatos. Olivia sends the class to hunt monsters in a dungeon. Ard and Ireena form a team with Ginny but due to years of Eraldo's bullying Ginny suffers from a severe lack of confidence. Ard teaches her Script Magic, a Lost Skill that makes casting spells faster. They are attacked by the Dungeon's Boss, a Minotaur. Ard allows Ginny to deal the killing blow with Script Magic and she feels pride for the first time as they become friends. Ginny finally stands up to Eraldo and slaps him, humiliating him. Before Ard can escape, Olivia grabs him for a private conversation.
3	"The Demon Lord's Play"; Transliteration: "Maō Gekijō" (Japanese: 魔王劇場)	Jun Fukuda	Michiko Yokote	Yūichi Nihei	April 20, 2022
Olivia drags Ard to Golde who asks him to participate in the academy duel event and impress the Queen to secure additional academy funding. Ginny asks him on a date and Ireena insists on joining them, which Ginny accepts as she is happy to share Ard and plans to create a harem for him, which Ireena violently opposes. During the date they attend a theatrical performance about Varvatos, though Ard is depressed at how it portrays Lydia, his deceased lover, as sweet and romantic when she was a proud warrior. Ard happens to overhear a cultist group planning to kidnap the Queen during the duel event and follows them underground. They are captured and reveal they lured them there to kill Ard. However, Ard defeats them easily, except the leader, who is revealed to be a demon in disguise. He flees to the streets where Ard destroys him and is celebrated by the crowd. For his heroics they are summoned by Queen Rosie, a friend of Ireena's, who at first jokes she shall take Ard as her husband to annoy Ireena, but instead grants the academy its funding, promotes Ard and Ireena to Pentagon class Mages and Ginny to Triangle-Mage. The surviving cultists reveal they planned to fail so as to measure Ard's strength as part of their plot to help their master rule the world.
4	"Duel"; Transliteration: "Kettō" (Japanese: 決闘)	Yamato Ōuchi; Takahiro Nakatsugawa	Michiko Yokote	Kubo Shiba	April 27, 2022
A student named Lemming confesses her love to Ard, though only to enhance her reputation, and is scared off by a jealous Ireena, who then glares at Ard and abruptly walks away. Having secured the funding already, Ard refuses to participate in the duel event, disappointing Golde who had hoped Ard would impress the nobles enough to promote Ard to an academy instructor. In his room, as Ard thinks about how to make up with Ireena, Ginny arrives and tries to seduce Ard. Ireena also arrives, having planned to do something similar as an apology for her jealousy, but becomes angrier when she sees Ginny. They decide to duel over Ard, but he yells at them to stop and forbids them from competing for him. Suddenly, Professor Jessica enters as she was eavesdropping, and explains Golde's plan to make Ard an instructor and decides they will duel at the duel event in front of Queen Rosie. At the duel event, Ard is depressed three of the judges are his parents and Ireena's father Olhyde. Due to having learned Lost Skills from Ard, both Ireena and Ginny win their matches against other students. Before their own duel begins, demon cultists appear in the audience and Jessica stabs Olhyde in the back, revealing she is actually Elzard the Frenzied Dragon King, and their plan the whole time was to kidnap Ireena. Ginny tries to stop Elzard, but fails and get injured. Ginny can only watch as Elzard abducts Ireena.
5	"The Story of a Lonely King"; Transliteration: "Kodoku Narishi Ō no Monogatari" (Japanese: 孤独なりし王の物語)	Yamato Ōuchi; Mirai Minato	Kento Shimoyama	Tetsuro Amino; Kōji Itō	May 4, 2022
Ard heals Olhyde's injuries and he gives Ard access to the royal armory so he can rescue Ireena. Jack recommends that Olhyde reveal the truth to Ard about their background, which had Ireena withdrawn for so long. However, he's hesitant to do so due to the circumstances behind them. Elzard prepares to sacrifice Ireena to a monster called the Orphan of Chaos as a ritual to summon an Evil God and destroy the world that she hates. After promising Ginny that he will save Ireena, Ard arrives in time to kill the monster and Elzard's followers. Back at the manor, Olhyde talks with Jack about how his family are the true rulers of the country and how the ones instated are proxies. Elzard tries to turn him against Ireena by revealing Ireena's family is the true royal family and are descendants of the Evil Gods, but he does not care. They battle and he impales Elzard, but she reverts to her true dragon form and attacks again. Ard summons an apparition of Lydia to fight by his side and reverts to his Varvatos form. He deduces that Elzard's true motivation was loneliness, but that was no excuse for threatening Ireena and he slays her. Lydia disappears and Ard reverts to normal. As they walk home, Ireena is frightened of him at first, but remembers that he accepted her even after learning her secret and vows to become strong enough to fight by his side.
6	"The Raging Champion"; Transliteration: "Gekidō no Yūsha" (Japanese: 激動の勇者)	Masahiko Suzuki	Michiko Yokote	Miyana Okita	May 11, 2022
A young girl named Sylphy emerges from a dungeon to find the world has changed. A masked man informs her time moves differently within that particular dungeon, so while she was inside 3000 years have passed by. He reveals Varvatos and her sister, Lydia, both died long ago but Varvatos soul has reincarnated as Ard Meteor. The academy will soon hold a festival including a stage performance which Golde wants Ard to perform in. He also reveals they have received a threat from someone named Lars Al Ghoul. Sylphy confronts Ard about his reincarnation and what happened to Lydia, but Ard feigns ignorance while Olivia, who knew Sylphy 3000 years ago, is very interested in Sylphy's claims. Sylphy challenges Ard to a duel, and when Ard wins, Sylphy loses her temper, earning a scolding from Ireena, making Sylphy cry as Ireena reminds her of Lydia. Ard's class decide the performance should be on the life of Varvatos, with Ard as Varvatos by popular demand, Ireena as Lydia, and Sylphy as the Evil God. For their class project they decide to host a maid café during the festival with the maids in very risqué outfits designed by Ginny, which the girls only agree to wear after learning they would be allowed to serve Ard. The masked man watches all this, looking forward to how Sylphy will react when she learns what really happened 3000 years ago.
7	"The Exciting Festival"; Transliteration: "Hakunetsu no Saiten" (Japanese: 白熱の祭典)	Masamune Hirata	Tōko Machida	Yūichi Nihei	May 18, 2022
Sylphy causes chaos at the festival and is sent to the maid café. Ard comes across a tree rumored to contain an item sealed by the Great Sword King. Olivia reveals she entered the Great Sword King tournament and entered Ard against his wishes. The tournament prize is a replica of Vald-Galgus, the sword wielded by the Great Sword King, which originally was Lydia's. Olivia, Ireena, Ard, Sylphy, and Ginny win their tournament duels and become finalists. Ginny asks Ard to compete with her in a Miss and Mister Beauty Contest. Ard spots Eraldo at the beauty contest who confesses when he and Ginny were children he was her friend but his father taught him anyone not nobility was inferior, which led to him bullying her. He hopes one day to apologize and be forgiven. Ard feels guilty he still has not told Sylphy the truth. Ard and Ginny win the contest, infuriating Ireena who wanted to compete. Ard faces Olivia in the next duel, who tries to force him to reveal his true power. Ard refuses and accidentally blasts Olivia far away. They are both disqualified, Ard for cheating and Olivia for not making it back in time. Ireena duels Ginny, continuing their argument over Ginny's harem plan, until Ireena is victorious. The masked man is disappointed at events so far and decides to manipulate them a little.
8	"The Mask Laughs"; Transliteration: "Kamen wa Warau" (Japanese: 仮面は嗤う)	Yamato Ōuchi	Tōko Machida	Kubo Shiba	May 25, 2022
Ard realizes the stage performance is based on the battle of Avia Desa Veers, which he won thanks to Sylphy laying magical traps on the battlefield and claiming the enemy commander's sword, Demise-Argis, for herself. The masked man approaches Sylphy. The next day Sylphy wins her final match against Ireena, claiming the Vald-Galgus replica. Ard meets her by the tree where she reveals the replica is actually the real Vald-Galgus and the item sealed in the tree is its power source. She combines the two into the complete Vald-Galgus and also summons Demise-Argis before trying to kill Ard. The masked man watches with joy, revealing he placed Sylphy under mind control and showed her a memory of Ard murdering Lydia. Ard reverts to his Varvatos form and the mind control is broken when Sylphy hears Lydia's voice. Disappointed, the masked man retrieves the two swords to kill Ard himself, revealing he needs to sacrifice Ireena to resurrect his true master. The two swords reject him as he is not powerful enough to wield them, so Ard destroys him. The Lydia apparition appears and tells Sylphy her death was not Ard's fault and to focus on living a full life. Ard is not surprised Lydia calls him a dumbass before disappearing.
9	"According to a God"; Transliteration: "Kami Iwaku" (Japanese: 神曰く)	Yasuo Ejima	Kento Shimoyama	Yasuo Ejima	June 1, 2022
The class is on a field trip when time suddenly freezes except for Ard, Ireena and Ginny, then they get sent to a white void and meet a boy claiming to be a god. The boy says a being will meet Varvatos and attempt to destroy the world and asks them to defeat it. They wake up in the wilderness and see two moons in the sky, so Ard realizes they were sent to the distant past of Varvatos' reign and explains one of the moons was destroyed. They rescue a girl from a giant scorpion. Olivia arrives and thanks them for saving her subordinate, then asks them to join Varvatos' army as they are at war with otherworldly beings. They accept local clothing from her and Ard requests that they serve under the scholar Verda, since she doesn't fight on the front lines and the girls should be safe. Ireena and Ginny inadvertently insult Verda when they don't recognize her since she doesn't resemble her image in historical records. They explain they are from the future and Verda promises to help them. Sylphy and Lydia show up to request reinforcements, but Lydia becomes attracted to Ginny and sexually harasses her. Ard interferes and Lydia angrily challenges him to a fight that ends in a draw. Ard requests an audience with Varvatos, but Lydia says they will have to prove themselves in battle.
10	"To the Battlefield of Old"; Transliteration: "Inishie no Senjō e" (Japanese: 古の戦場へ)	Masahiko Suzuki	Kento Shimoyama	Kōji Yoshikawa; Hikaru Takeuchi	June 8, 2022
The group stays in a girl named Latima's house and Lydia sexually harasses Ginny in the bath. They later enter battle and Ard effortlessly captures the enemy general, impressing Lydia enough to grant them an audience with Varvatos and making Sylphy jealous. Along the way, Alvarto picks a fight with Ard, but Varvatos and Lydia scold and dismiss him. Ard becomes slightly jealous of his past self when Ireena and Ginny become attracted to him. To the trio's confusion, Varvatos is not called the Demon Lord and says the enemy's leader has that title. After Varvatos dismisses them, they discuss the inconsistencies with Verda, who speculates that the Demon Lord, whom Varvatos fought to a draw in the past, is the being the god wanted them to stop and is changing history. Ginny suggests telling Varvatos the truth, but they will need to do something impressive to meet him again. Ard leaves Ireena and Ginny behind to join Lydia and Sylphy on a raid of Mevilas the Curse King, whom Ard remembers as the one who cursed Lydia and forced Varvatos to kill her. However, when they arrive at his stronghold, Mevilas has already been killed by a dark, armored knight, the Demon Lord, who declares that he will defeat Varvatos and conquer the world before disappearing.
11	"Those with Resolve"; Transliteration: "Kakugo Aru Mono" (Japanese: 覚悟ある者)	Takahiro Nakatsugawa	Michiko Yokote	Hiroshi Yoneda	June 15, 2022
Ard is confused at the orders of God to repair history as it would mean killing many people who are now alive, including Lydia. The Demon Lord appears to Ard and reveals he is also Ard, but from an imminent future where, after losing everything, he changed his name from Ard to Disaster-Rogue. He too has been sent back in time by God but with the mission of destroying the world and battling Varvatos, but the guilt over his mistakes is too much so he intends to save Lydia and then die in battle against her. He gives Ard time to consider joining him before vanishing. Later, Lydia asks what is troubling him and Ard cryptically asks what she would do if she had to die to fix a mistake. She takes him to a town she had to destroy during the war, massacring even the children and explains due to guilt she has already decided she will one day die in complete obscurity once the world is finally at peace. During the next battle Ard sneaks away to meet Disaster-Rogue and explains he will not deny Lydia her own repentance and will allow her to die. Disaster-Rogue attacks him but due to their identical abilities neither can win, until Disaster-Rogue reveals he arranged for the battle to occur at the same time as their duel to distract him.
12	"Beyond Our Determination"; Transliteration: "Ketsui no Saki ni" (Japanese: 決意の先に)	Yūshi Ibe	Kento Shimoyama	Miyana Okita; Kōji Itō	June 22, 2022
Ireena is upset that Ard left her and Ginny behind, then Latima takes them on a mission to destroy a crystal that is the source of Disaster-Rogue's immortality. However, when they reach it, Latima betrays them and binds them to magic-nullifying crosses, revealing she is working for Disaster-Rogue. Disaster-Rogue shows Ard the captive girls and orders Ard to join him or they will die, saying he will kill anyone just to save Lydia. Ireena and Ginny escape the crosses using atypical magic taught by Ard. Undaunted, Latima summons a squad of monsters, saying she will kill anyone just to save Lydia. Lydia arrives, as she had put tracking devices on the two, defeats the monsters and knocks Latima out, then destroys the crystal. After losing his immortality, Disaster-Rogue attacks Ard in a rage. They both remember a time they had a fight with Lydia that they regret. An apparition of Lydia restrains Disaster-Rogue, allowing Ard to kill him. As soon as he dies, Ard, Ireena, and Ginny start disappearing. Lydia, who knew they were from the future, asks the two girls if the people are happy in the future. When they confirm it, she asks them to pass a message to Ard. In the white void, the god thanks Ard for succeeding. He will not identify himself, but says he is an ally. The trio wake up in the present shortly after they left, while Olivia and Sylphy berate them for falling asleep. Ireena passes Lydia's message: no matter what happens, they will always be friends. Ard is happy when he sees the apparition of Lydia watching over him.
