= Onegai AiPri =

Japanese arcade game

おねがいアイプリ (Onegai AiPuri)
- Genre: Magical girl; Idol; Science fiction
- Video game
- Developer: syn Sophia
- Publisher: Takara Tomy Arts
- Platform: Arcade
- Released: April 2, 2026
- Video game

AiPri Verse
- Developer: syn Sophia
- Publisher: Takara Tomy Arts
- Platform: Arcade
- Released: April 2, 2026
- Anime television series
- Directed by: Junichi Fujisaku; Masahiro Matsunaga
- Written by: Gigaemon Ichikawa
- Music by: Izumi Mori
- Studio: OLM Division 1; DongWoo A&E
- Original network: TXN (TV Tokyo)
- Original run: April 5, 2026 – present
- Episodes: 34
- Other series
- Pretty Rhythm: Aurora Dream (2011); Pretty Rhythm: Dear My Future (2012); Pretty Rhythm: Rainbow Live (2013); PriPara (2014); Idol Time PriPara (2017); Kiratto Pri Chan (2018); Waccha PriMagi! (2021); Himitsu no AiPri (2024); Onegai AiPri (2026)

Onegai AiPri (Japanese: おねがいアイプリ, Hepburn: Onegai AiPuri) is a Japanese arcade game by Takara Tomy Arts. The sequel series to Himitsu no AiPri, it is part of the AiPri Verse, the fifth generation in the Pretty Series.

Like its predecessor Himitsu no AiPri, its anime television series is co-produced by OLM, Inc. and DongWoo A&E, and began airing on April 5, 2026, on TV Tokyo and on its TX Network affiliates.

== Plot ==
In the virtual world known as AiPri Verse, Inori Konomi is a first year middle school student who had just moved to Onegai Town. While praying to the goddess statue in the plaza, she happens to run into the popular AiPri idol Aoi Yumemiya and the stuffed animal Fouchuu. Aoi is searching for an AiPri who can grant Fouchuu's wishes. By opening the special Mirror Pact given by Aoi, Inori makes her long-awaited AiPri debut.

== Characters ==
=== Smile Heart ===
Inori Konomi (好実いのり, Konomi Inori)
Voiced by: Hanaka Ogawa
Inori is a first year middle school student, who has just returned to Onegai Town. She is bright, easygoing, and honest who loves showing her feelings towards others. She can sometimes be impulsive, but never says "no" when someone asks her for a favor.
Nana Atami (熱海ナナ, Atami Nana)
Voiced by: Minori Fujidera
Nana is a second year middle school student at High Sense Academy and a young lady who lives in the biggest mansion in Onegai Town. She always looks at Inori and her friends with a fearless smile.
Gumi Tomosaka (友坂ぐみ, Tomosaka Gumi)
Voiced by: Wakana Maruoka
Gumi is a caring first-year junior high school student who can quickly become friends with anyone. Her "Gumi Gumi Stickers" are a symbol of the friendship between everyone.

==== Pure Heart ====
Aoi Yumemiya (夢宮あおい, Yumemiya Aoi)
Voiced by: Rika Kanaya
Aoi is a first year middle school student at Onegai Middle School living with Fortu. Due to being excellent at both studies and sports, everyone is jealous of her. However, Aoi is also caring and has a dream of her own, so she will do anything to achieve her dreams.
Olivia Yuki (勇樹おりびあ, Yuki Oribia)
Voiced by: Haruka Okamura
Olivia is a second year middle school student at Onegai Middle School, who is quiet and reserved, but is also a responsible student council president. She is a kind girl who can muster up the courage to do her best for someone, but knows and loves AiPri.
Emma Mochinaga (望永エマ, Mochinaga Ema)
Voiced by: Minori Suzuki
Emma is a mysterious second year middle school student at High Sense Academy who seems to see through everything and gives strange advice to Inori and the others through her crystal ball. She also seems to be active as an AiPri.

=== AiPriverse ===
Meganee Akai (赤井めが姉ぇ, Akai Maganee)
Voiced by: Kanae Itō
Meganee Akai is a big sister who supports AiPri at AiPriverse. She also works as the manager of the AiPri Shop and Cafe in Onegai Town. She offers advice on coords and makeup.
MC PriUsa (MCプリうさ, MC PuriUsa)
Voiced by: Showtaro Morikubo
MC PriUsa is a rabbit MC who attends AiPri performances and raise excitement. He often adds "pyon" to the end of his sentences, and his catchphrase is "Puri-tto, Usa-tto, Hiwawipyon!"
PriNeko (プリねこ, PuriNeko)
Voiced by: Fūka Izumi
PriNeko is a cat mascot who is in charge of the reception at AiPri Castle. She supports the AiPri together with Meganee. PriNeko refers to herself as "Boku" (ぼく) and adds "~nya" to the end of her sentences.
Riori (りおりー)
Voiced by: Rio Orino
Riori is a member of the Onegai AiPri Club who is active on AiPriverse loves Aipri and fully enjoys her AiPri life. She is in charge of the pink color.
Azumin (あずみん)
Voiced by: Nao Azumi
Azumin is a member of the Onegai AiPri Club who is active on AiPriverse, loves AiPri, and enjoys her AiPri life.
Kyoka (きょうか)
Voiced by: Kyouka Kikkawa
Kyoka is a member of the Onegai AiPri Club who is active on AiPriverse, loves AiPri, and enjoys her AiPri life freely. She is in charge of yellow.
Fortu (フォーチュ, Foucchu)
Voiced by: Yo Taichi
Fortu mascot that acts alongside Aoi. She looks like a blue-purple puppy with wings and adds "-chu" to the end of her sentences. Fortu has the ability to sense people's wishes and to absorb the wish prisms that appear when wishes are granted to make new AiPri cards appear.
Elp (エルプ, Erupu)
Voiced by: Inagaki Yoshimi
Elp is Emma's cherished Pricorn from when she was little. She appeared in the AiPri Verse to convey the voice of the goddess to everyone.

=== Onegai Middle School ===
Principal (校長先生, Kocho-sensei)
Voiced by: Yusa Koji
The principal of Onegai Middle School and Emma's father.
Koharu Hanasaki (花咲こはる, Hanasaki Koharu)
Voiced by: Abe Natsuko
Koharu is a second-year student at Onegai Middle School. She created the AiPri Club, a place where everyone who loves AiPri can gather.
Takami (高見先生, Takami-sensei)
Voiced by: Yumika Yano
Takami is the homeroom teacher of Inori's class.
Satsuki Kobayakawa (小早川さつき, Kobayakawa Satsuki)
Voiced by: Akari Kageyama
Satsuki is a member of the track-and-field club who is best friends and teammates with Wakaba, Aoi's older sister.
Serizawa (芹沢先生, Serizawa-sensei)
Voiced by: Chika Anzai
Serizawa is the supervising teacher of the athletics club.
Kiko Shioki (塩木記子, Shioki Kiko)
Voiced by: Nao Oyama
Kiko is the secretary of the student council.
Kanpeki Koike (小池完璧, Koike Kanpeki)
Voiced by: Kohei Yanagi
Kanpeki is the treasurer of the student council.
Kanata Matsuzaki (松崎かなた, Matsuzaki Kanata)
Voiced by: Maria Naganawa
Kanata is a first year schoolboy at High Sense Academy.

=== AiPri's family members ===
Miho Konomi (好実穂, Konomi Miho)
Voiced by: Ichijo Kazuya
Miho is Inori's grandfather who is the mayor of Onegai Town and always in high spirits.
Karen Konomi (好実可憐, Konomi Karen)
Voiced by: Rei Igarashi
Karen is Inori's grandmother.
Chikuwa (チクワ)
Voiced by: Miharu Hanai
Chikuwa is a dog owned by Inori's grandparents.
Wakaba Yumemiya (夢宮若葉, Yumemiya Wakaba)
Voiced by: Mayuko Kazama
Aoi's older sister. She is very good at sports and belongs to the athletics club.
Gum Tomosaka (友坂がむ, Tomosaka Gamu) and Choco Tomosaka (友坂ちょこ, Tomosaka Choko)
Voiced by: Yumiri Hanamori
Gum and Choco are Gumi's younger twin siblings.
Leon Yuki (勇樹れおん, Yuki Reon) and Alan Yuki (勇樹あらん, Yuki Aran)
Voiced by: Makoto Koichi (Leon), Tasuku Hatanaka (Alan)
Leon and Alan are Olivia's younger brothers. Leon is in Grade 3 of Onegai Elementary School while Alan is a sophomore at Preparatory High School.
Puppy (子犬, Koinu)
Voiced by: Miharu Hanai
A lost puppy who became best friends with Leon.
Sango Atami (熱海サンゴ, Atami Sango)
Voiced by: Imai Fumiya
Sango is Nana's passionate older brother with a great fashion sense. He balances his work as a company manager and student.
Ryousuke Koriyama (氷山涼介, Koriyama Ryousuke)
Voiced by: Seiichiro Yamashita
Ryousuke is Nana's calm butler and with a great sense of fashion.
Futo Manabu (富戸まなぶ, Manabu Futo)
Voiced by: Ayaka Ohashi
Futo is Leon's classmate and Olivia's younger brother. He is always tutoring and helping Reon with his studies.

=== Secondary Characters ===
Tate Goto (タテ・ゴトー, Tate Goto)
Voiced by: Reiou Tsuchida
Tate is an artist who is popular among people of all ages thanks to his sweet voice and his love poems.
Mayumi Inugami (犬上まゆみ, Inugami Mayumi)
Voiced by: Ruriko Aoki
Mayumi is a young woman who is always walking her dog at Wish Square.
Eisho Someya (染谷えいしょう, Someya Eisho)
Voiced by: Gen Sato
Eisho is a young man from the stationery shop in Onegai Shopping District.
Mai Nakajima (中嶋マイ, Nakajima Mai)
Voiced by: Hiori Nashimoto
Mai is a student in Grade 6 of elementary school and Inori's friend who visited to Onegai Town.
Ayaka Yamazaki (山崎あやか, Yamazaki Ayaka)
Voiced by: Misa Nagaoka
Ayaka is the older sister of Mai's pen-pal who loves AiPri.
Nobue (のぶえ)
Voiced by: Eriko Hara
Nobue is a grandmother who came to see the Aipri Fest.

=== Other Characters ===
Himari Aozora (青空ひまり, Aozora Himari)
Voiced by: Minori Fujidera
In episode 33, Himari appeared as silhouette in Aoi's dreams
Mitsuki Hoshikawa (星川みつき, Hoshikawa Mitsuki)
Voiced by: Sae Hiratsuka
Mitsuki appeared as a silhouette in Aoi's dreams with Himari

== Media ==
=== Arcade game ===
The AiPri arcade games Onegai AiPri and AiPri Verse were released on April 2, 2026. Both games were developed by Syn Sophia and published by Takara Tomy.

=== Anime ===
The anime series was first announced in January 2026, and a month later on February 26, announced that the series would have a premiere date set for April 2026. Similar to its predecessor, Himitsu no AiPri, the anime is produced by OLM, Inc. and DongWoo A&E. It premiered on TV Tokyo and on its affiliates via the TX Network system on April 5. The first opening theme song is "Onegai AiPri!" (おねがいアイプリ!, Onegai AiPuri!) by Onegai Kanae-tai, while the ending theme is "After School, Please!" (放課後のおねがい!, Hōkago no Onegai!), performed by Iginari Tohoku San. A second opening theme titled "Miracle Granting Yell!" (かなえてキセキのエール!, Kanaete Kiseki no Ēru!) by Onegai Kanae-tai and its second ending "Please Telepathy" (おねがいテレパシー, Onegai Terepashī) has begun from episode 27 onwards.

==== Episode List ====
No.	Title	Written by (Note: Information is taken from the ending credits of each episode.)	Storyboard by	Original release date
1	"Please Make Me an AiPri!"; Transliteration: "Onegai! Aipuri ni Natte" (Japanese: おねがい！アイプリになって)	Jūokuemon Ichikawa	Masahiro Matsunaga	April 5, 2026
In Onegai Town, first year middle school student Inori Konomi makes a wish to the goddess statue, hoping that she can become an idol. Suddenly, Aoi Yumemiya, a popular AiPri idol, calls out to her. When they go to the AiPri shop together, Inori is asked by a little girl named Moko to choose a present for her older sister who is moving away. When Inori advises her to give her something she likes from the bottom of her heart, the stuffed animal Aoi was holding suddenly starts talking and introduces herself as Fortune. Using the Mirror Pack and Wish Jewel given by Aoi, Inori makes her AiPri debut.
2	"Let's Make That Dream Come True"; Transliteration: "Sono Yume, Kanaechao♪" (Japanese: その夢、かなえちゃお♪)	Hideaki Shirasaka	Junichi Fujisaku	April 12, 2026
Inori enrolls at Onegai Middle School as she begins her life in Onegai Town, where she is put in the same class as Aoi. After school, Aoi takes Inori to Meganee's cafe in Onegai Town, where Fortune asks Inori to join the Wish-Fulfilling Squad that grants the wishes of the people of Onegai Town.
3	"The Only Big Love"; Transliteration: "Tatta Hitotsu no Daisuki" (Japanese: たったひとつのだいすき)	Naoki Ohira Ichikawa	Yumi Suzumori	April 19, 2026
Inori and Aoi encounter their classmate, Gumi Tomosaka, who has lost a sticker that she cherished. They begin to search for the sticker, only to not have any luck.
4	"Our Friend is an AiPri?!"; Transliteration: "Tomodachi wa AiPri?!" (Japanese: おともだちがアイプリ)	Saji Komori	Masaharu Okuwaki	April 26, 2026
Inori and Aoi are tasked by Meganee-san to run on an errand. As Inori and Aoi enter the confectionery they were looking for, they find Gumi there, who is amazed by their live performance. When Inori recommends Gumi to try becoming an AiPri, the latter rejects, but Gumi has been secretly training to become an Aipri without telling Inori and Aoi.
5	"The First AiPri Fest!"; Transliteration: "Hajimete no AiPuri Fesu!" (Japanese: はじめてのアイプリフェス！)	Junichi Fujisaki	Masahiro Matsunawa	May 3, 2026
Inori's grandfather, the mayor of Onegai Town, visits the Goddess Shrine to make a wish that the place would be full of smiles. Inori requests him to celebrate the Onegai Town AiPri Festival, but there are a few attendances on the due date. With the help of Koharu from the AiPri Club, they suggest people to gather.
6	"Let's Connect! Dreams and Big Love"; Transliteration: "Tsunagō！Yume to Daisuki" (Japanese: つなごう！ゆめとだいすき)	Hideaki Shirasaka	Akio Naito	May 10, 2026
Inori and Gumi are excited to have a sleepover at Aoi's house, where Aoi seriously she wants to have a session about the AiPri Festival. The festival was successful, but she wants to be able to perform for even more people. As Aoi tells Inori and Gumi about her aspirations, they either have to choose between filling the plaza with customers and trying a new concept of live performance.
7	"Two Wishes"; Transliteration: "Futatsu no Negai" (Japanese: 二つの願い)	Nanto Yoshioka	Akira Nishimori	May 17, 2026
The Wish-Fulfilling Team received two requests. The first was from Satsuki, who was worried because she had injured herself during club practice, but her friends were saying it was nothing serious. The other was from Aoi's older sister, Wakaba, who worries over her good form as the track-and-field competition is on the way.
8	"What I Wanted to Say"; Transliteration: "Iitakatta Koto" (Japanese: 言いたかったこと)	Saji Komori	Naoki Ohira	May 24, 2026
The idols thank student council president Olivia for making the AiPri Festival successful, but she seems busy with the student council's Flower Planting Campaign. When Gumi hears this, she brings Olivia some baked goods to cheer her up as she works hard alone.
9	"With the Wings of Courage"; Transliteration: "Yūki no Tsubasa de" (Japanese: ゆうきのつばさで)	Yumi Suzumori	Akihiro Enomoto	May 31, 2026
Olivia visits the AiPri Shop alone and meets Meganee Akai, who wonders if she wants to become an AiPri. Later, as Koharu and the Wish-Fulfilling Team arrive at the shop, Olivia quickly leaves the shop as if she was running away. Koharu stops Olivia, wanting to talk to her about the next AiPri Festival. However, Olivia worries over lying to Koharu, saying that she did not know much about AiPri despite wanting to become one.
10	"Little Friends"; Transliteration: "Chīsana Otomodachi" (Japanese: ちいさなおともだち)	Hideaki Shirasaka	Masaki Ōzora	June 7, 2026
Gumi meets one of Olivia's younger brothers, Leon, who has been acting strangely for losing his bread since morning. Worried that he might be hoarding all breads in town, Olivia begins searching for him.
11	"Inori's Treasure"; Transliteration: "Inori no Takaramono" (Japanese: 祈りの宝物)	Nato Yoshioka	Meigo Naitō	June 14, 2026
Inori invites her friends to her birthday party. Aoi, Gumi, and Olivia are trying to give a present to Inori, to Inori's grandparents. When the three girls tried to hear what Inori liked, they found out that every-time they returned to Inori's House, they had asked the statue of the goddess to grant her wish. However, Aoi is busy trying to make it the best birthday party. Just before the party starts, everyone finds out it is raining outside.
12	"Gumi and Olivia"; Transliteration: "Gumi to Oribia" (Japanese: ぐみとおりびあ)	Saji Komori	Naoki Ohira	June 21, 2026
Koharu wants Olivia's live performance to be the main event of the upcoming second AiPri Festival. Gumi encourages her to do it, but Olivia refuses due to her lack of confidence.
13	"Take Flight! AiPri Fest!"; Transliteration: "Tobitate! Aipuri Fesu!" (Japanese: 飛び立て！アイプリフェス！)	Yumi Suzumori	Meigo Naito	June 28, 2026
As the second annual Onegai AiPri Festival, Inori is excited and in high spirits while Olivia is trembling with nervousness. Later, Wakaba, Koharu, Satsuki, Leon, Moko, Gam, Choco, and Ho come to cheer them on. Regaining her composure, Olivia – alongside the duo consisting of Inori and Aoi – takes the stage. The festival is successful with Olivia Yuki ended up it.
14	"My High Sense!"; Transliteration: "Watashi no Hai Sensu!" (Japanese: わたしのハイセンス！)	Hideaki Shirasaka	Masaki Ōzora	July 5, 2026
As the second AiPri Festival has ended, Kanata – a student at High Sense Academy – says she enrolled there with the dream of becoming a fashion designer, but has now given up. Later, another student from said school, Nana Atami, urges Kanata to find her dream.
15	"The Passionate AiPri"; Transliteration: "Jōnetsu no Aipuri" (Japanese: 情熱のアイプリ)	Junichi Fujisaku	Meigo Naito	July 12, 2026
Nana decides to become an AiPri following talks with her brother, Sango, at the mansion, who wonders whether or not Nana can be granted wishes as she debuts. However, as Nana visits the Aipriverse for the first time, she cannot achieve a Buzzlume Change. At the same time, Shioki and Koike – students the Onegai Middle School student council – are making a wish to the goddess. Shioki and Koike are lamenting that they cannot get their hands on a watermelon and will be unable to cheer their friends up during the summer volunteer activity. Wanting to make them regain motivation, Inori and Aoi perform a live show to cheer them up with their new song, "Top Power".
16	"Passion's Top Power"; Transliteration: "Jōnetsu Afureru Attōtekina Chikara" (Japanese: 情熱あふれる圧倒的な力)	Junichi Fujisaku	Meigo Naito	July 18, 2026
Inori and her friends are looking forward to summer vacation. Nana has performed many live shows, but has yet to successfully perform a Buzzlum Change. A request from Leon suddenly arrives, telling that he is depressed, because he has made his friend Manabu angry for not getting a perfect score on a test. Gumi performs a full live show to help them make up, singing "Top Power". Inori, Aoi, Gumi, Olivia, and Fortu welcome her Nana as the latter successfully achieves her Buzzlum Change and joins the Wish-fulfilling Squad.
17	"Aoi and the Wish-fulfilling Squad"; Transliteration: "Aoi to Onegai Kanaetai" (Japanese: あおいとおねがいかなえ隊)	Minato Yoshioka	Naoki Ohira	July 26, 2026
On a summer holiday, Inori hears a rumor from Moko of a ghost at the beach as she stops by Meganee's cafe. Inori suggests that the Wishing Squad go and look for it, but Aoi refuses, saying she has homework. Just as Nana joins Aoi, they really spot a ghost on the beach.
18	"Emma Has Seen Everything"; Transliteration: "Ema ni wa Miechaimashita" (Japanese: エマには見えちゃいました)	Ichikawa Jūokuemon	Kentaro Fujita	August 2, 2026
Wanting to make the upcoming AiPri Festival successful, Gamu and Choco build a huge sandcastle at the beach. Just as it is almost finished, Gamu and Choco go home to get the flag they will put on top. When Gamu and Choco return to the beach with Gumi, they find the sandcastle has been swallowed by the waves and collapsed. As the disappointed duo end up fighting, Inori and Aoi perform a live show to cheer them up. Meanwhile, Emma appears before Gamu, who wishes to build another sandcastle with Choco.
19	"Onegai Town's Mistery"; Transliteration: "Onegai Machi no Fushigi" (Japanese: おねがい町のふしぎ)	Yumi Suzumori	Masaki Oozora	August 9, 2026
Upon watching Nana's passionate live performance, Meganee Akai is filled with emotion and embark on a three-day summer holiday. Nana's butler, Hyozan, is put in charge of acting store manager, and Inori and the others also decided to help out at the store. Later, Shioki hopes to see the Midsummer Blue Jewel, which is said to be only visible in summer.
20	"Go for it! Courage and Passion!"; Transliteration: "Butsukare! Yūki to Jōnetsu!" (Japanese: ぶつかれ！勇気と情熱！)	Hideaki Shirasaka	Meigo Naito	August 16, 2026
The day before the third AiPri Festival, the High-Sense Festival hosted by Sango happens to occur, featuring Tate Goto. Nana suggests that she perform the final live show of the AiPri Festival, but Olivia argues that Nana's performance is only worthy of being at the top. As the relationship between Nana and Olivia becomes strained, Nana challenges Olivia to a live show showdown.
21	"Tell Me Everything at Once, Fortu-chu"; Transliteration: "Matomete Oshiete Fōchutchū" (Japanese: まとめて教えてフォーチュっちゅー)	Junichi Fujisaki	Junichi Fujisaki	August 23, 2026
Inori and Aoi reminisce the memories of the first time they met at Goddess Statue.
22	"Heart-pounding! The Summer Fest Showdown"; Transliteration: "Doki-doki! Natsu no Fesu Taiketsu" (Japanese: ドキドキ！夏のフェス対決)	Nanto Yoshioka	Meigo Naito	August 30, 2026
The day of the showdown between the AiPri Festival and the High-Sense Festival has arrived. Inori and Aoi hosted a duo performance in the former, followed by Emma's solo, and finally another duet performance by Aoi and Gumi.
23	"Goodbye, then" Transliteration: "Sayōnara, na no de" (Japanese: さようなら、なので)	Saji Komori	Naoki Ohira	September 6, 2026
Nana arrives at Onegai Middle School and asks Inori and Aoi to find her school friend, Emma. After finding out that Emma has submitted a transfer request, Nana forms the Onegai Detective Team with Inori and Aoi to search for her. While Gumi and Olivia are performing a duo live show, the other idols spot Emma carrying her bag, announcing her departure from Onegai Town.
24	"The Fate of a Letter"; Transliteration: "Tegami no Yukue" (Japanese: てがみのゆくえ)	Yuka Yamada	Masafumi Sato	September 13, 2026
Inori's friend, Mai, has come to Onegai Town to visit Inori and the other idols. She also wants to meet her pen-pal, Ayaka. Inori and the others begin searching Ayaka together, only to discover that the picture book store where Ayaka was supposed to live moved a week ago...
25	"The Ghost's Wish"; Transliteration: "Obake-chan no Onegai" (Japanese: おばけちゃんのおねがい)	Hideaki Shirasaka	Meigo Naito	September 20, 2026
The idols arrive in AiPriverse and meet the members of AiPri Club – Riori, Azumin, and Kyoka – who say that the idols have received a request from the ghost.
26	"Let's Pop-corn!"; Transliteration: "Pop ni Iko~n" (Japanese: ポップにいこ〜ん！)	Nanto Yoshioka	Masaki Ōzora	September 27, 2026
Inori prays to the statue of the goddess, hoping to meet her soon, only to realize that she and the other idols must fulfill many more wishes and begin special training. Nana comes up with ideas like taiyaki-themed outfits and poetry, but Gumi objects. Later, Inori receives news that her grandfather is hospitalized.
27	"Six Wishes"; Transliteration: "Muttsu no Onegai" (Japanese: 六つのおねがい)	Junichi Fujisaku	Meigo Naitō	October 4, 2026
Wanting to restore the Goddess' power and bring about miracles, the idols must overcome her trial. Later, they receive a request from Alan, who has been volunteering at an after-school program to mend damaged stuffed animals. Upon hearing this, Nana decides to help out, only to lack experience in sewing.
28	"Deliver it! Pure Heart!"; Transliteration: "Todoke! Pyua Hāto" (Japanese: とどけ！ピュアハート)	Saji Komori	Yutaka Terasaki	October 11, 2026
As Onegai Town hosts an art festival, Aoi and her friends receive a request from Shioki and Koike, who also want to join them in.
29	"Tell Me That I Love You"; Transliteration: "Daisuki o Oshiete" (Japanese: だいすきをおしえて)	Yumi Suzumori	Naoki Ōhira	October 18, 2026
Emma hopes to know more about "goddess' miracle", but is not sure if she works hard enough yet. Having seen how Emma improved her relationship with Aoi and the others to make their "Pure Heart" live performance successful, Inori wants to become closer to Emma herself, but is feeling anxious, knowing she still needs to collect more Wish Prisms. However, upon hearing Inori's desire to get to know Emma better, they agree to spend time together.
30	"Please! Happy Halloween"; Transliteration: "Onegai! Happī Harowīn" (Japanese: おねがい！ハッピーハロウィン)	Hideaki Shirasaka	Minoru Ōhara	October 25, 2026
Gumi and Olivia have planned a live performance on Halloween, featuring brand-new outfits they have prepared for their younger brothers. However, in the AiPriverse, everything has turned into pumpkins after a mishap by some mischievous fairies. Even worse, the AiPri cards containing Gumi and Olivia's new outfits have gone missing. The idols search everywhere for them everywhere, only to not have any luck.
31	"Forever Friends Fest"; Transliteration: "Zutto Otomodachi Fesu" (Japanese: ずっとおともだちフェス)	Nanto Yoshioka	Masaki Ōzora	November 1, 2026
With the fourth AiPri Festival on the way, the Wish-fulfulling Squad encounters an elderly woman named Nobue, who hopes to watch the best live performance ever with her friends as she makes a wish in front of the Goddess Statue. Determined to make her wish come true, the idols attend the festival featuring several performances: "Pop Icon!" by Smile Heart, "Blue Parade" by Pure Heart, and "Top Power" by Nana and Emma. Nobue attends the festival, only to find out that friends are nowhere to be seen by her side.
32	"Wish-Fulfilling Channel!"; Transliteration: "Onegai Kanae Channeru!" (Japanese: おねがいかなえチャンネル！)	Junichi Fujisaku	Junichi Fujisaku	November 8, 2026
Inori and the others look back on the 4th AiPri Fest, which filled Onegai Square with the smiling faces of all the PriTomo and the 3rd AiPri Fest that was a showdown against the High Sense Fest. Besides the festivals, they also revisit various past events while performing lives such as repairing stuffed animals together, Elp’s Halloween pranks, the letter that arrived for Mai and the time Inori’s grandfather was hospitalized.
33	"The First Wish"; Transliteration: "Sa Isho no Onegai" (Japanese: さいしょのおねがい)	Yumi Suzumori	Meigo Naitō	November 15, 2026
Aoi stays home with a cold. Inori, Gumi, and Olivia are worried about her. While illiness, Aoi dreams of her younger self—back when her desire to become an "AiPri" first took root. Due to her cautious nature, she never dared to take the leap, she practices diligently but lacks self-confidence, so she makes a wish to the goddess. Just then, a heavy downpour begins, and she encounters Fortu, who is completely drenched by the rain…
34	"Shine On! Onegai Kanae-tai"; Transliteration: "Kagayake! Onegai kanae-tai" (Japanese: 輝け！おねがいかなえ隊)	Saji Komori	Daisuke Kurose	November 22, 2026
Now feeling better, Aoi is excitedly planning a training regimen to clear the "Goddess's Trial." Inori is also full of enthusiasm, hoping to find a new dream like Gumi, Olivia, Nana, and Emma. Just then, Fortu catches a wish. The deputy Mayor of Onegai Town, Michael Ishino, has made a wish: "I want to create lots of smiles with the people who come to town!" The Onegai Granting Team performs one live show after another to support his dream.
