= False Child =

Japanese manga series

- First tankōbon volume cover

嘘の子供 (Uso no Kodomo)
- Genre: Drama
- Manga
- Written by: Taku Kawamura
- Published by: Square Enix
- English publisher: NA: Square Enix
- Imprint: Gangan Comics Joker
- Magazine: Monthly Gangan Joker
- Original run: November 22, 2022 – March 22, 2024
- Volumes: 4

False Child (嘘の子供, Uso no Kodomo) is a Japanese manga series written and illustrated by Taku Kawamura. It was serialized in Square Enix's shōnen manga magazine Monthly Gangan Joker from November 2022 to March 2024.

== Synopsis ==
The series is centered around a bake-danuki seeking revenge on human society disguising herself as a grieving couple's dead daughter. The parents decide to resume living with the bake-danuki as their child.

== Publication ==
Written and illustrated by Taku Kawamura, False Child was serialized in Square Enix's shōnen manga magazine Monthly Gangan Joker from November 22, 2022, to March 22, 2024. Its chapters were collected into four tankōbon volumes released from March 22, 2023, to July 22, 2024.

The series is published in English on Square Enix's Manga UP! Global manga service.

No.	Release date	ISBN
1	March 22, 2023	978-4-7575-8479-2
2	July 22, 2023	978-4-7575-8673-4
3	November 21, 2023	978-4-7575-8906-3
4	July 22, 2024	978-4-7575-9310-7

== See also ==
- My Clueless First Friend, another manga series by Taku Kawamura
