= Kōhei Amasaki =

Japanese voice actor (born 1990)

- 天﨑 滉平
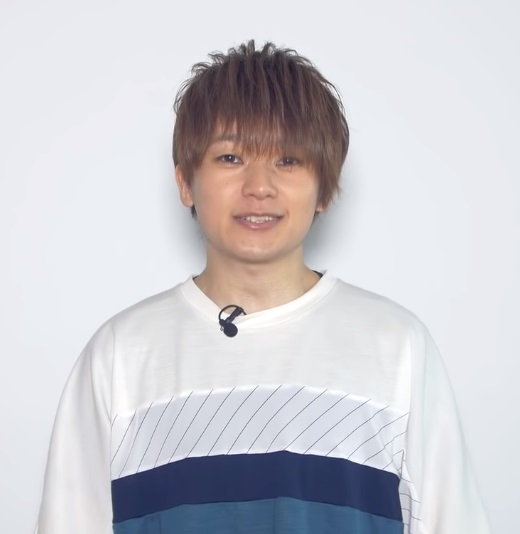
- Amasaki in 2018
- Born: October 22, 1990 (age 36); Settsu, Osaka Prefecture, Japan
- Occupation: Voice actor
- Years active: 2014–present
- Agent: I'm Enterprise
- Notable work: Hi Score Girl as Haruo Yaguchi; Tales of Crestoria as Kanata Hjuger; Hypnosis Mic: Division Rap Battle as Saburō Yamada; Re:Zero − Starting Life in Another World as Otto Suwen
- Height: 172 cm (5 ft 8 in)
- Awards: Best New Actor Award and Singing Award at the 13th Seiyu Awards

Kōhei Amasaki (天﨑 滉平, Amasaki Kōhei; born October 22, 1990) is a Japanese voice actor. He is affiliated with I'm Enterprise. He won the Best New Actor Award and Singing Award at the 13th Seiyu Awards. He has two older brothers.

== Filmography ==
=== Television animation ===
Year	Title	Role	Ref.
2015	Gundam Build Fighters Try	Masami Kodera	
2015	Mobile Suit Gundam: Iron-Blooded Orphans (2015–2017)	Takaki Uno	
2015	Charlotte	Nago, Komatsu, middle student boy A, Turbanned boy with freezing ability	
2015	Noragami Aragoto	Seki	
2016	Please Tell Me! Galko-chan	Konta	
2016	The Disastrous Life of Saiki K.	Boy, Male student A, Sōji Aizawa, Student E, Yūta Iridatsu	
2016	BBK/BRNK	Probus	
2016	Flip Flappers	Salt	
2016	The Lost Village	Wanko	
2016	Mob Psycho 100 (2016–2019)	Takeshi Hoshino	
2016	Momokuri	Yamaguchi	
2016	Monster Hunter Stories: Ride On (2016–2018)	Pappan	
2016	Re:Zero − Starting Life in Another World (2016–2021)	Otto Suwen	
2017	Scum's Wish	Mirai Yamamoto	
2017	My Hero Academia (2017–2025)	Neito Monoma, Shihai Kuroiro	
2017	The Eccentric Family	Suzuki	
2017	Knight's & Magic	Takeda	—
2017	Tsuredure Children	Jun Furuya	
2017	Nana Maru San Batsu	Kazuyoshi Tani	—
2017	KAITO×ANSA	Yorimichi Homoda	—
2017	Just Because!	Junpei Saruwatari	
2017	Magical Circle Guru Guru	Schnavel	—
2017	The Idolmaster SideM	Soichirō Shinonome	
2018	Sword Dynasty	Fūsō	—
2018	Hakyū Hōshin Engi	Ri Kōha	—
2018	Shinkansen Henkei Robo Shinkalion	Daiya Oyama	—
2018	Rokuhōdō Yotsuiro Biyori	Kinako	
2018	Black Clover (2018–2020)	Neige	
2018	High School DxD Hero	Regulus	—
2018	Hi Score Girl (2018–2019)	Haruo Yaguchi	
2018	Cells at Work!	Common Cell 1	—
2018	Muhyo & Roji's Bureau of Supernatural Investigation (2018–2020)	Kenji Satō	
2018	Double Decker! Doug & Kirill	Kirill Vrubel	
2018	The Idolmaster SideM Wake Atte Mini!	Soichirō Shinonome	
2018	Tsurune (2018–2023)	Manji Sugawara	
2019	Dororo	Kaname	
2019	Namu Amida Butsu! -Rendai Utena-	Seishi Bosatsu	
2019	Isekai Cheat Magician	Taichi Nishimura	
2019	Try Knights	Sōya Randō	
2019	After School Dice Club	Shōta Tanoue	
2019	Stars Align	Taiyō Ishigami	
2020	number24	Kotori Kureha	
2020	Smile Down the Runway	Ryūnosuke Eda	
2020	The God of High School	U Sunte	
2020	Hypnosis Mic: Division Rap Battle: Rhyme Anima (2020–present)	Saburō Yamada	
2021	I-Chu: Halfway Through the Idol	Runa Kagurasaka	
2021	2.43: Seiin High School Boys Volleyball Team	Mitsuomi Ochi	
2021	Pokémon Journeys	Rinto	
2021	Banished from the Hero's Party	Albert	
2022	Love of Kill	Jim	
2022	Requiem of the Rose King	Edward of Westminster	
2022	One Piece	Fourtricks	
2022	The Greatest Demon Lord Is Reborn as a Typical Nobody	Varvatos	
2022	Dance Dance Danseur	Misaki Yasuda	
2022	Don't Hurt Me, My Healer!	Zobita	
2022	Play It Cool, Guys	Aoyama	
2022	Arknights: Prelude To Dawn	Mephisto (Eno)	
2022	Mobile Suit Gundam: The Witch from Mercury	Till Nys	
2023	Tomo-chan Is a Girl!	Kosuke Misaki	
2023	My Clueless First Friend	Kotarō Kitagawa	
2023	Heavenly Delusion	Ken Tachibana	
2023	The Rising of the Shield Hero Season 3	Fohl	
2024	Firefighter Daigo: Rescuer in Orange	Hiromi Kittaka	
2024	Villainess Level 99	Oswald Grimsarde	
2024	Unnamed Memory	Curve	
2024	Alya Sometimes Hides Her Feelings in Russian	Masachika Kuze	
2024	Days with My Stepsister	Yūta Asamura	
2024	Wistoria: Wand and Sword	Will Serfort	
2024	Murai in Love	Kiriyama	
2024	Let This Grieving Soul Retire!	Luke Sykol	
2024	I'll Become a Villainess Who Goes Down in History	Alan Williams	
2025	Promise of Wizard	Chloe	
2025	Farmagia	Ten	
2025	Witch Watch	Kanshi Kazamatsuri	
2025	#Compass 2.0: Combat Providence Analysis System	Thorn	
2025	The Too-Perfect Saint: Tossed Aside by My Fiancé and Sold to Another Kingdom	Julius Ziltonia	
2025	The Water Magician	Amon	
2025	Yano-kun's Ordinary Days	Tsuyoshi Yano	
2026	There Was a Cute Girl in the Hero's Party, So I Tried Confessing to Her	Yōki	
2026	Yoroi-Shinden Samurai Troopers	Isa Nyūdō	
2026	Tamon's B-Side	Natsuki Ishibashi	
2026	Magical Sisters LuluttoLilly	Shōta Seo	
2026	Marika's Love Meter Malfunction	Kanata Kitami	
2026	Heroine? Saint? No, I'm an All-Works Maid (and Proud of It)!	Christopher Von Théolas	
2026	Iron Wok Jan	Takao Okonogi	
2026	Dr. Stone	young male Why-Man	^{Ep. 95 credits}
2026	The Ghost in the Shell	Number 19	
2026	Overgeared	Pon	
2027	Dengeki Daisy	Akira	
2027	Fate Rewinder	Akaba	

=== Anime films ===
Year	Title	Role	Ref.
2015	The Anthem of the Heart	Akihisa Shibuya	
2020	Happy-Go-Lucky Days	Shin-chan's father	
2022	Ensemble Stars!! Road to Show!!	Aira Shiratori	

=== Original video animation (OVA) ===
Year	Title	Role	Source
2014	Inui-san!	Kōtarō Hitsuji	—
2015	Nozo×Kimi	male student A	—
2019	Double Decker! Doug & Kirill	Kirill Vrubel	—
2019	Hi Score Girl	Haruo Yaguchi	—
2024	Code Geass: Rozé of the Recapture	Rozé	

=== Original net animation (ONA) ===
Year	Title	Role	Source
2015	Monster Strike	Percival, Student B	
2018	A.I.C.O. -Incarnation-	Male Student	—
2024	A Herbivorous Dragon of 5,000 Years Gets Unfairly Villainized	Mysterious Man	

=== Video games ===
Year	Title	Role	Ref.
2015	I-Chu	Runa Kagurazaka	
2015	Prince of Stride	Gouto Goseki, Akemi Konomura	
2016	The Idolm@ster SideM	Soichirō Shinonome	—
2016	Akasasu Sekai de Kimi to Utau	Ōna	—
2016	Ikemen Bakumatsu ◆ Unmei no Koi	Kirisato	—
2016	Suran Digit	An Hachizawa	
2016	Namu Amida Butsu!	Seishi Bosatsu	—
2016	Ys VIII: Lacrimosa of Dana	Rastell	
2017	Kizuna Striker!	Rinya Satsuki	—
2017	Sengoku Night Blood	Kakei Jūzō	—
2017	The Idolm@ster SideM Live on STAGE	Soichirō Shinonome	—
2018	LORD of VERMILION IV	Haruo Yaguchi	—
2018	Piofiore: Fated Memories	Emilio	
2018	Choice×Darling	Takumi Yaida	—
2018	World end Heroes	Shin Mitsugi	—
2018	100 Sleeping Princes and the Kingdom of Dreams	Ivan	
2019	Op8♪	Shino Kagura	—
2019	Samurai Shodown	Yashamaru Kurama	
2019	A3!	Kaya Mizuno	—
2019	Hero's Park	Shiduki Suō	—
2019	Puzzle & Dragons	Yashamaru Kurama	—
2019	DRAGON QUEST X	Yair	—
2019	SD Gundam GGENERATION CROSSRAYS	Takaki Uno	—
2019	Promise of Wizard	Chloe Collins	
2020	Ensemble Stars!!	Aira Shiratori	
2020	Hypnosis Mic: Division Rap Battle	Saburō Yamada	—
2020	Magia: Charma Saga	Aiden Rutelan	—
2020	To the moon	Yuki Natsukawa	—
2020	I-Chu Étoile Stage	Runa Kagurazaka	—
2020	Tales of Crestoria	Kanata Hjuger	
2020	Re:Zero − Starting Life in Another World: Lost in Memories	Otto Suwen	—
2021	The Idolm@ster SideM GROWING STARS	Soichirō Shinonome	—
2021	Re:Zero − Starting Life in Another World: The Prophecy of the Throne	Otto Suwen	
2022	Digimon Survive	Takuma Momotsuka	
2022	Sword Art Online: Alicization Lycoris	Rogu	
2023	A Certain Magical Index: Imaginary Fest	Silvercross Alpha	
2023	Sword Art Online: Last Recollection	Rogu	
2024	Ride Kamens	Lance Tendo and Q / Kamen Rider LOQ	
2026	Genshin Impact	Lohen	

=== Dubbing ===
Year	Title	Role	Source
2023	Boiling Point	Billy	

=== Tokusatsu ===
Year	Title	Role	Source
2024	Kamen Rider Gotchard	Germain (voice)	

=== Drama CD ===
- Fantastic Night (2021), INORIN

=== Radio programs ===
- Lost Village "Public relations division in Nanaki village hall" (迷家‐マヨイガ‐「納鳴村 村役場広報課」, Mayoiga Nanaki Mura Mura Yakuba Kouhouka, 2016)
- Kentarō Tone with Unpleasant Company (利根健太郎とゆかいな仲間たち, Tone Keontarō to Yukai na Nakamatachi, 2017)
- Monthly: New "Handsome communication" (月刊 新・男前通信, Gekkan Otokomae Tsūshin, 2017)
- Kōhei Amasaki, Takeo Ōtsuka "Are We Friends Yet?" (天﨑滉平、大塚剛央の僕たちもうフレンドですよね？, Amasaki Kōhei, Ōtsuka Takeo no Bokutachi Mou Friend Desuyone?, 2017-)
- RADIO M4!!!! (2017-)
- THE IDOLM@STER SideM Radio "315 Pro Night!" (アイドルマスター SideM ラジオ 315プロNight!, Idolmaster SideM Radio Saikō Puro Night, 2018)
- Matsuoka Hamburg Steak (松岡ハンバーグ, Matsuoka Hamburg, 2018-)
- MAN TWO MONTH RADIO "Kōhei Amasaki's OTAKU report" (MAN TWO MONTH RADIO 天﨑滉平のオタク探訪, MAN TWO MONTH RADIO Amasaki Kōhei no Otaku Tanbō, 2018)
- Tomohito Takatsuka, Kōhei Amasaki "LOVE TRAIN 2522" (2018-2019)
- Hi Score Girl Dojo (ハイスコアガール道場, Hi Score Girl Dōjō, 2018 - 2020)
- Kengo Kawanishi, Kōhei Amasaki "Tenkaippin" (河西健吾 天﨑滉平 天河一品, Kawanishi Kengo Amasaki Kōhei Tenkaippin, 2019-)
- Isekai Cheat Radio (異世界チート放送局, Isekai Cheat Hōsōkyoku, 2019)
- Ensemble stars!! Radio Square!! of "ALKALOID" & "Crazy:B" (あんさんぶるスターズ!!『ALKALOID』&『Crazy:B』のラジオスクエア！！, Ensemble stars!! “ALKALOID”& “Crazy:B” no Radio Square, 2019-)

== Awards and nominations ==
Year	Award	Category	Work/Recipient	Result	Ref(s)
2019	13th Seiyu Awards	Best New Actor Award		Won	
2019	13th Seiyu Awards	Singing Award	Hypnosis Mic franchise	Won	
2019	5th Aniradio Awards	BEST BENEFIT RADIO	Matsuoka Hamburg Steak	Nominated	
2019	5th Aniradio Awards	BEST CUTE RADIO	Are We Friends Yet?	Nominated	
2020	6th Aniradio Awards	BEST CUTE RADIO	Are We Friends Yet?	Won	
