= Double Decker! Doug & Kirill =

Japanese anime television series

- Key visual for the series
- DOUBLE DECKER! ダグ＆キリル
- Genre: Action
- Developed by: Tomohiro Suzuki
- Directed by: Jōji Furuta; Ryō Andō (Note: Series Unit Director (シリーズ演出))
- Music by: Yuki Hayashi
- Country of origin: Japan
- Original language: Japanese
- No. of episodes: 13

Production
- Producer: Kazuhiko Tamura
- Animator: Sunrise
- Production companies: Sunrise; DD Partners

Original release
- Network: Tokyo MX, BS11, MBS
- Release: September 30 – December 23, 2018

Related
- Manga
- Written by: Mizuki Sakakibara
- Published by: Shueisha
- Imprint: Young Jump Comics
- Magazine: Tonari no Young Jump
- Original run: October 1, 2018 – March 30, 2020
- Volumes: 4

Double Decker! Doug & Kirill (Japanese: DOUBLE DECKER! ダグ＆キリル) is a Japanese anime television series produced by Sunrise. The series premiered from September 30 to December 23, 2018. The production team features some of the staff who worked on the Tiger & Bunny series.

== Plot ==
In the city-state Lisvaletta, while people go about their tranquil everyday lives, crimes and illegal drugs run rampant. Above all, a dangerous, highly-fatal drug named "Anthem" is casting a dark shadow on the streets. The "Seven-O" special criminal investigation unit whose speciality is to supervise the investigation of Anthem, institutes a "Double Decker System" policy of forming groups of two investigators, and all members are given nicknames.

One team consists of the veteran investigator Doug Billingham accompanied by the rookie Kirill Vrubel. This unconventional duo combines an aloof veteran detective who is hard to get a read on, and an inexperienced detective who is a little too eager.

== Characters ==
=== Seven-O ===
A special department of Lisvaletta's narcotics division focused on dealing with Anthem trafficking, serving directly under the military.

Douglas "Doug" Billingham (ダグラス･ビリンガム, Dagurasu Biringamu) / "Veteran"
Voiced by: Satoshi Mikami (Japanese); Ian Sinclair (English)
The most experienced member of Seven-O. Doug is a skilled professional in the field, but also displays a laid back, deadpan demeanor. He insists on exclusively using .38 caliber handguns because he considers them detective's weapons. His personal vehicle is a modified sports car resembling a DMC DeLorean that is loaded with gadgets and is able to assume a high-speed mode. His signature color is red.

Kirill Vrubel (キリル・ヴルーベリ, Kiriru Vurūberi) / "Perm" / "Okappa" / "Buzz-Cut"
Voiced by: Kōhei Amasaki (Japanese); Micah Solusod (English)
Doug Billingham's new rookie partner, a 20-year-old former police constable with dreams of becoming a hero. Kirill is impulsive, cocky, and dense, contrasting with his partner's cooler personality, with his philosophy for life being "don't think, feel so good." Kirill's "good luck charm" saying is later revealed to be an excerpt of a poem known as "Nikai's Prayer." Despite his seeming idiocy, Kirill is surprisingly knowledgeable in the field of genetics, having written a detailed scientific paper on the subject as a teenager to earn a scholarship. He is often confused for a woman because of his slender build and androgynous face. His signature color is purple. All of his nicknames so far have referred to his hairstyle in some manner.

Deana del Rio (ディーナ・デル・リオ, Dīna Deru Rio) / "Pink"
Voiced by: Saori Hayami (Japanese); Jamie Marchi (English)
Seven-O's resident sniper, displaying a somewhat rude and blunt personality and partnered with Katherine. Deana is fiercely independent and quick to break protocol to solve a case, often clashing with her partner's strict insistence on following the rules. Her signature color is pink.

Katherine "Kay" Roshfall (キャサリン・ロシュフォール, Kyasarin Roshufōru) / "Rookie"
Voiced by: Chika Anzai (Japanese); Natalie Hoover (English)
A relatively "normal" woman compared to the rest of the team, with her most eccentric trait being that she is an avid foodie, Katherine is the latest rookie in Seven-O (beating Kirill by a single day), partnered with Deana. The two frequently clash over their opposing personalities, with Kay finding Deana's casual dismissal of rules and protocol exasperating. Her signature color is green.

Maxine "Max" Silverstone (マキシーン・シルヴァーストーン, Makishīn Shiruvuāsutōn) / "Boxer"
Voiced by: Yō Taichi (Japanese); Beth Lipton (English)
An aggressive and tomboyish Seven-O inspector partnered with Yuri. In her youth, Max was a shy, bookish, and feminine girl who enjoyed crafts and cute things. She adopted her current look as a favor to her transgender friend Connor, who came out at their high school prom and was shunned by their schoolmates, turning to drugs and disappearing after being denied entry. Despite becoming colder and more bitter since then, Max retains many domestic hobbies, including cooking and taking care of plants. Yuri notes that despite her "tough girl" exterior, Max is still warm and gentle at heart. Her personal vehicle is a bulky, futuristic motorcycle. Her signature color is blue.

Yuri Fujishiro (ユリ・フジシロ, Yuri Fujishiro) / "Robot"
Voiced by: Atsumi Tanezaki (Japanese); Brittany Lauda (English)
An inspector in Seven-O partnered with Max, displaying a calm and logical, yet warm and friendly personality in contrast to her partner's brasher attitude. Yuri, befitting her nickname, is actually a highly advanced android imbued with incredible strength and computational abilities, a fact that is open knowledge to everyone in the department but Kirill. The department keeps this a secret from him solely to mess with him, finding his attempts to keep her "secret" entertaining. Her signature color is white.

Travis Murphy (トラヴィス・マーフィー, Toravuisu Māfī) / "Boss"
Voiced by: Rikiya Koyama (Japanese); Barry Yandell (English)
The head of Seven-O, a somewhat eccentric man who seems to pick members of his team based on arbitrary quirks. He considers the four female inspectors and Sophie to be "Travis' Angels," a name they all find demeaning and sexist.

Sophie Gainsbourg (ソフィー・ゲンズブール, Sofī Genzubūru)
Voiced by: Aya Endō (Japanese); Madeleine Morris (English)
Seven-O's dispatcher, a young woman who dresses in lolita fashion and behaves in a "cute," childish manner. Her signature color is orange.

Apple Bieber (アップル・ビーバー, Appuru Bībā) / "Doctor"
Voiced by: Takuma Nagatsuka (Japanese); Justin Briner (English)
Seven-O's resident technology expert. Apple insists on being referred to as "Doctor" (though this is usually ignored by everyone in the department but Kirill) and is in charge of creating and maintaining all of the team's equipment.

=== Esperanza ===
A powerful Anthem-related criminal organization and the main antagonists of the series.

Zabel Franken (ザベル・フランケン, Zaberu Furanken) / "Z."
Voiced by: Yutaka Aoyama (Japanese); Chuck Huber (English)
The leader of Esperanza. At first thought to be the lowest member on the organization's A-to-Z hierarchy, it is soon revealed that Zabel is actually the organization's true leader. He murders Agepetus Kroyd, the man thought to be Esperanza's boss, in a plot to throw off law enforcement. Zabel despises those who waste food, demanding his subordinates finish a meal completely before leaving the table.

Bamboo Man (バンブーマン, Banbūman) / "B."
Voiced by: Daisuke Namikawa (Japanese); Robert McCollum (English)
A high-ranking member of the criminal organization Esperanza. Bamboo Man dresses in a clown-like outfit with rubies replacing his teeth and possesses incredible superhuman abilities that do not come from Anthem usage, including enhanced strength and speed and the ability to change his face. Bamboo Man is later revealed to have assumed the identity of Brian Cooper, a high-ranking member of the Lisvaletta military.

Agapetus Kroyd (アガペトス・クロイド, Agapetosu Kuroido) / "A."
The assumed leader of Esperanza, who is killed by Zabel Franken, Esperanza's true leader, in a plot to throw off law enforcement.

=== Other characters ===
Derick Ross (デリック・ロス, Derikku Rosu)
Voiced by: Tsuyoshi Koyama (Japanese); Gabe Kunda (English)
Doug's former partner. He retires from the police after recovering from being shot on a case to open his own bar. He is noted to not be very good at running the bar, serving patrons canned and frozen food and having no customers beyond Seven-O's inspectors.

Valery Vrubel (ヴァレリー・ヴルーベリ, Vuarerī Vurūberi)
Voiced by: Yūki Fujiwara (Japanese); Daman Mills (English)
Kirill's older brother who works at Derick's bar. For most of Kirill's life, Valery cross-dressed and posed as his sister under the name "Milla," his secret only being exposed when Kirill stumbles upon him in the men's restroom of Derick's bar. The deception is revealed to be because Valery and Kirill are escapees from Nikai (Japanese for "second floor"), the second and brighter sun in Lisvaletta's sky. Valery-as-Milla walking out of Kirill's life and disappearing ten years ago became Kirill's inspiration to join the police force.

Brian Cooper (ブライアン・クーパー, Buraian Kūpā)
Voiced by: Tesshō Genda (Japanese); Brandon Potter (English)
Secretary of the Lisvalletta military, who is in fact and native of Nikai and a Genetically Modified Soldiers (GMS). He is aware of Kirill and Valery's past as natives of Nikai and Kirill's ability to provide an antidote to Anthem.

Anthem Users
Users of the drug Anthem are split into three separate phases: Phase 1 – suspected usage, Phase 2 – Accelerating usage and Phase 3 – Anthem-induced Overdrive. The Seven-O cannot intervene until they determine a users has entered Phase 2 when they develop a distinguishing mark on their neck, and once users enter Phase 3, they can mutate and gain superhuman powers. Users can also attain an even more dangerous transformation via overdose.

Nikai
Nikai is the name give to the planet's second sun which is in fact a human space colony set up by its human inhabitants who left a wasted planet many years ago seeking a new home. This culminated in a different civilization which developed Genetically Modified Soldiers (GMS), but found the process time-consuming and expensive. A miniaturized and portable version of the active drug was then developed and given the name Anthem, and the Esperanza organization was selected to distribute it on the planet's surface while the military retained the antidote.

== Media ==
=== Anime ===
The 13-episode anime series was announced on January 4, 2018, titled Double Decker! Doug & Kirill, and premiered from September 30 to December 23, 2018, on Tokyo MX and other channels. The series is directed by Joji Furuta and produced by Ryo Ando, with animation by studio Sunrise and forms part of the Tiger & Bunny project. Tomohiro Suzuki returned to produce the series' scripts. Masakazu Katsura returned to handle character designs. Norihiro Itagaki returned to handle animation character design. Yuki Hayashi composes the music. The opening theme is "Stereo to Monologue" by KiRiSaMe, and the ending theme is "Buntline Special" by Vickeblanka. The series was simulcasted on Crunchyroll, with Funimation producing an English dub as it aired. A three-episode anime titled Extra Story was released on February 10, March 10 and April 10, 2019.

==== Episodes ====
No.	Title	Original release date
1	"Howl at the Two Suns"; Transliteration: "Futatsu no Taiyōnihoero" (Japanese: 二つの太陽にほえろ!)	September 30, 2018
An almost invulnerable mutated "Anthem" user runs amok on the city and the police are unable to subdue him. Doug Billingham takes over and prepares a cocktail of drugs in a special bullet but the shot is deflected leaving him vulnerable to the "Anthem" user. Deana del Rio is there to back him up and shoots the mutant. Kirill Vrubel is shown as an ambitious police officer who is blackmailed on his day off into finding his landlady's cat. He stumbles onto a hostage situation in an abandoned factory building where the criminal Cyrus Martinez is demanding the release of Zabel Franken, an imprisoned executive of the criminal Esperanza organization. Although they are aware of the situation, Seven-O cannot intervene until Anthem is detected. Meanwhile Kirill sees this as an opportunity to be a hero, and when Doug Billingham enters the building through a pipe, he gives Kirill that opportunity. Once Kirill has determined that Martinez is an Anthem user Billingham subdues him while Kirill rescues his associate, Jefferson, who was also a hostage. Later, Kirill's boss transfers him out of his department into Seven-O where he is given the nickname "Perm", but he objects and takes the nickname "Okappa".
2	"Farewell Detective Okappa"; Transliteration: "Sarabo, Okappa Keiji" (Japanese: さらぼ、オカッパ 刑事)	September 30, 2018
Travis Murphy tells Kirill that he has to return to his old police unit due to an administrative mistake, but is granted one week to prove himself at Seven-O. With two days to go, Kirill takes a tip-off of potential Anthem smuggling to Doug Billingam, but it only turns out to be animal smuggling and outside their jurisdiction. Suddenly they receive notice of a riot at Desperatio Prison in Ignis Base Island started by prisoner Henry Glen, possibly aided by the guard Rob Lotz. Doug suspects that Henry Glen used Anthem-induced Overdrive to produce genetic evolution and disguise himself. Doug finds Glen driving an ambulance and they give chase. They catch him as the Anthem mutation takes over, turning him into a beast, and Doug shoots him with an antidote. Later, Kirill is despondent at his lost opportunity to be a hero, to which Doug replies that he is only interested in ridding society of poverty and class distinctions. Surprisingly, Travis lets Kirill stay, but renames him "Buzz-Cut".
3	"Your Rival is Your Partner's Partner!"; Transliteration: "Kōtekishu wa aibō no aibō!" (Japanese: 好敵手は相棒の相棒!)	October 7, 2018
Anthem is suspected to be originating from within the Igniscastrum industrial zone. The main suspect is Bamboo Man who has jeweled teeth. Kirill is assigned to investigate with Doug, but Kay is also sent with them whom Kirill sees as a rival. They pretend to be a film crew interviewing protesting workers. Kirill is suspicious and stakes out the factory, calling in reinforcements when a truck convoy leaves late at night, but they are only carrying oil. However, Doug suspects the union leader Harry Bottoms is in league with Tommy, the company foreman, and he intercepts them preparing a shipment of Anthem. Bottoms escapes in a truck while the Bamboo Man places an Anthem patch on Tommy. Meanwhile Kirill and Kay have dinner, oblivious to the events until Botoms crashes the truck and takes them hostage. Doug arrives, but is attacked by Tommy who has gone into Anthem Overdrive and turned into a monster. Kirill recklessly distracts Tommy so Doug can shoot him with an Anti-AMS Bullet. Later, Doug gives Kirill a light, colorful gun, and accepts him as his partner.
4	"Derick Returns!"; Transliteration: "Kaettekita, Derikku!" (Japanese: 帰ってきた、デリック!)	October 14, 2018
Doug's former partner Derick Ross is released from hospital, but opens a bar instead of returning to Seven-O. Deana, Maxine, Yuri and Kay are assigned to investigate the "Train Spotter" club that may be dealing Anthem. However Kay lets their target escape as she argues with Deana over protocol. Frustrated with her treatment Kay meets an old friend, Gary, at Drug Control Division, and they investigate the club together. However, Gary abducts her instead and reveals that he is selling the Anthem that his squad confiscates, and also deals in fake Anthem. His associates capture Kirill and Yuri and demand a sample of the Anti-AMS Bullet drug. When Deana delivers a bullet as agreed, Gary opens fire, but he misses her. He takes Anthem and uses Anthem Overdrive to attempt to kill her, however Deana uses her natural speed to rescue Kay and fire an Anti-AMS Bullet into the monster Gary. Yuri and Maxine then collaborate to capture the rest of the gang. Later, Deana tells Kay that they had planned the raid from the beginning, using Kay to trace the gang as they already suspected that Gary was corrupt.
5	"A. Kroyd Killer!"; Transliteration: "A Kuroido Goroshi!" (Japanese: A・クロイド殺し!)	October 21, 2018
Zabel Franken (or Z in Esperanza's alphabetically sorted hierarchical order) is on death row for killing five people but claims he killed six and asks to speak to Doug Billingam to confess. He says that he killed A., Agapetus Kroyd, assumed head of the Esperanza organization and describes the location of the body. On the way to find the body, Doug and Kirill are attacked by B., Bamboo Man, and Zabel escapes in the confusion. Later, Bamboo Man and Zabel kill Ricky, a guard who helped Zabel escape, and Bamboo Man calls Zabel boss.
6	"Up Close and Personal! 24 Hours With the Lisvalletta Police!"; Transliteration: "Mitchaku Risuvuaretta Keisatsu 24-ji!" (Japanese: 密着リスヴァレッタ警察24時！)	October 28, 2018
While Doug and Kirill are on a stake-out, they are called to investigate an incident at Casino Victoria in the luxurius Luminox Port area which is patrolled by Lisvalletta Police Department No.8 (L.V.P.D. No.8). They interview a man creating a disturbance, but he only appears to be drunk and they eventually release him. Meanwhile the event was recorded by a reality TV show, and when Kirill watches a recording, he sees his long lost sister Milla in the background while Doug sees the criminal that they are searching for on the same recording. Apple analyses the security videos and tries to track Milla, but loses her. Later, while the Seven-O team are hanging out at the No Name bar, Milla appears as the new attendant. Later, Milla reveals to Kirill that he has always been a man and his real name is Valery.
7	"Revenge Is Mine"; Transliteration: "Fukushū suru wa, wari ni Are!" (Japanese: 復讐するは、ワリにアレ！)	November 4, 2018
As Seven-O discusses Valery's revelation, Doug visits the grave of his former partner on the anniversary of his death. Later, Seven-O investigates the death of Zabel while Doug spends his time searching for someone called Good-Looking Joe because of his involvement in the death of an information broker, 12 year old Pat Morino eight years ago. Doug tracks down Joe and meets him at his hideout, and although Joe has prepared an ambush, Doug shoots his way out and arrests Joe for Pat's murder.
8	"Dancing! Academy Investigation!"; Transliteration: "Odoru! Gakuen Sōsa-sen!" (Japanese: 踊る！ 学園捜査線！)	November 11, 2018
Seven-O investigates a series of apparently random poison attacks on girls attending the exclusive Primus Academy who are candidates for the prom queen. The Seven-O team infiltrate the school undercover and find that tensions are high over the upcoming prom. The suspects are finally narrowed to Camilla, the best friend of Elle, the potential prom queen. Because of her own past, Max tries to help Camilla, but she takes an overdose of Anthem, turning into a wasp-like monster. However, Max manages to get through to her and Camilla is saved along with the other victims. Later, the Seven-O team throw a dance party for Max.
9	"Don’t Think! Feel So Good!"; Transliteration: "NA" (Japanese: ドントスィンクフィールソーグッド！)	November 18, 2018
While Apple is showing the Seven-O team his new inventions, they receive request to rescue the kidnapped daughter of William Doorman, a mayoral candidate. The operation is sanctioned by Secretary Brian Cooper of the Lisvalletta military. The planned interception at the ransom drop-off fails, but it is revealed that Doorman is behind the kidnapping. However he is being used by Zabel's Esperanza organization and Doug is kidnapped and tortured for information about Anti-AMS bullets. Apple tracks their location and Kirill uses Apple's new inventions to lead the rescue attempt, quoting a saying from his grandfather "Don’t Think! Feel So Good!" before going into action. Despite some mishaps, Doug is rescued although he is badly beaten up and hospitalized.
10	"Failed Detective, But Pure"; Transliteration: "Hazure keiji junjō-ha!" (Japanese: はずれ刑事 純情派！)	November 25, 2018
While Doug recovers in hospital, Kirill demonstrates that he has an extensive understanding of genetics and agrees that Anthem could be used for medicinal purposes, much to the astonishment of the Seven-O team. He and Doug suspect that some terminally ill patients have been supplied Anthem while at hospital before they leave and later die. Kirill also encounters Gus, a teenager whose father is in the hospital with a terminal disease. Doug and Kirill discover that the head doctor is conducting clandestine experiments for Esperanza, feeding patients Anthem and dosing them with various amounts of the five antidote drugs to determine the rations for the Anti-AMS bullets. They stop him and also give some hope to Gus and his father for the future. After the incident Kirill is approached by the military secretary Brian Cooper who offers him a job.
11	"Seven-O Dies Twice!"; Transliteration: "Sebun - O wa ni-do shinu!" (Japanese: SEVEN-Oは二度死ぬ!)	December 9, 2018
Kirill is distracted by the offer of Brian Cooper to join the military. Cooper says Kirill is from the second sun Nikai, containing a different civilization with special abilities, which is later confirmed by Valery. Meanwhile, Seven-O is notified that Z’s hideout has been located and the police and military are about to attack. At the same time, Kirill learns that Z has abducted Apple and Sophie at Seven-O's headquarters and informs Doug by phone. At the headquarters, Zabel extracts the information he needs about Anti-AMS bullets from Apple by threatening to kill Sophie. Kirill and Doug arrive and confront Z, but he escapes just as Yuri and Deana arrive. Yuri intercepts an explosive charge fired at Kirill and the she leaps from the building as it explodes, destroying her. At Z's base, Z accuses B of plotting to overthrow him, but B counters with a surprise attack himself, killing Z and destroying the building. As he leaves, B contacts Kirill and alters his appearance to that of Brian Cooper.
12	"Detective In Danger"; Transliteration: "Keiji ga, Abunai" (Japanese: 刑事が、あぶない)	December 16, 2018
Following Yuri's death, Maxine offers her resignation and Kirill blames himself. Meanwhile Travis sends the Seven-O team home after a large number of Esparanza members are found dead after what appears to be an internal power struggle. Kirill is transferred to the military where Brian Cooper tells him about the history of the Nikai colony, their development of Genetically Modified Soldiers (GMS) like himself, and creation of Anthem; and importantly, the discovery that Kirill has the unique ability to neutralize Anthem. Meanwhile Apple discovers that Cooper is really B, and the Seven-O team approach Morgan at headquarters to acquire weapons for a rescue. They stage a mock pursuit of Anthem users to attack Cooper's underground base, while Doug rescues Kirill. Cooper pursues them and Doug reveals that Apple has produced an anti-GMS liquid called a Sugunaol Ace using Kirill's antibodies. However, to inject it into the super-powered Cooper, Doug prepares to take Anthem and achieve Overdrive, relying on Kirill to later provide the antidote for him. Cooper finds them, but has Valery as his captive, forcing Doug and Kirill to surrender. He then suddenly shoots Doug in the chest and destroys the Sugunaol Ace capsule.
13	"And Then There Weren’t None"; Transliteration: "Soshite Dare mo Inaku Naranakatta!" (Japanese: そして誰もいなくならなかった！)	December 23, 2018
Cooper reveals that he plans to destroy the military base now that he has Kirill captive. Kirill distracts him and Valery injects Cooper with the Anthem antidote, however Cooper uses Doug's Anthem Overdrive patch to overcome its effects. The rest of the Seven-O team arrive, but seem to have little effect on stopping Cooper, until Doug re-appears as his death was a ruse. Kirill injects Cooper with the Anthem antidote, but just as they arrest him, the installation begins to self-destruct. The Seven-O team manage to escape, in a helicopter piloted by Yuri. Meanwhile, inside, Zabel finds Cooper and kills him as explosions engulf the complex. Later it is revealed that Yuri is the original and it was copy which was destroyed. As the series ends, Esparanza is destroyed, the Anthem epidemic is blamed on Cooper’s treason and corruption, and Seven-O continues its work seeking out and apprehending Anthem users.

==== Extra Story ====
Three "Extra" episodes were released in 2019. The first was set between Episodes 4 and 5, the second was set between Episodes 8 and 9, and the third was set after Episode 13.

No.	Title	Original release date
1	"The Daily Lives of the Seven Detectives"; Transliteration: "Nana-nin no Keiji no Nichijō!"" (Japanese: 七人の刑事の日常)	February 10, 2019
Not much is happening at Seven-O, and Doug and Kirill spend a day on a stakeout which results in nothing. Back at the office the women discuss where to have lunch. Kay tells the others about her dream to become a police Officer, then Max, Sophie and Deana tell their stories although Deana's is not true. Later, Kirill meets Mark Belgar, a former partner of Doug.
2	"Infernal Affair"	March 10, 2019
The Seven-O unit has to infiltrate a party to investigate a Phase 1 target and a potential deal in the Anthem drug. Kirill is assigned to appear dressed as a waitress, however it proves more difficult than he imagines and his cross-dressing brother Valery is enlisted to help him out. His subterfuge works almost too well, but his acting manages to help the team capture the drug dealer.
3	"Detective Buzz-Cut and the Steamy Murder Mystery Case"	April 10, 2019
The Seven-O unit travels to the Zuy Attammi onsen which is run by the twin sister of their landlord. Everyone loosens up after eating and drinking, and Derek has eyes for Valery, not realizing that he is a man. There is drama that night when Derek is found naked and unconscious in the women's bath, but it is only because he slipped and fell. Meanwhile, they are targeted by Panty M, the panty thief, and after trying to catch him, they discover that he is one of seven septuplets who have been stealing panties for some time.

=== Manga ===
A manga adaptation illustrated by Mizuki Sakakibara ran on Shueisha Tonari no Young Jump website and the YanJan! app from October 1, 2018, to March 30, 2020. Four tankōbon volumes were published from December 19, 2018, to April 17, 2020.
