= Toshinari Fukamachi =

Japanese voice actor

- 深町 寿成
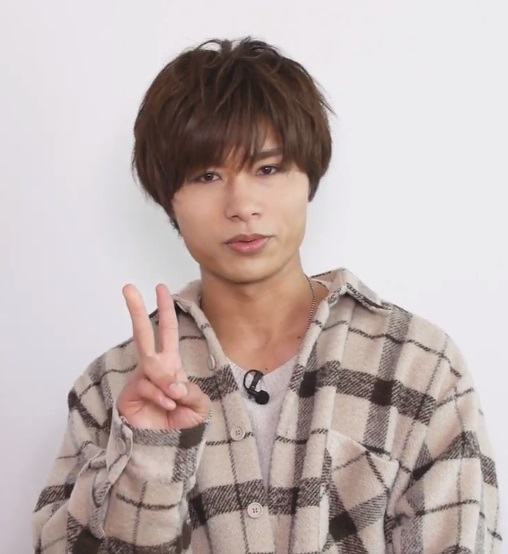
- Born: August 29; Yamagata Prefecture, Japan
- Occupation: Voice actor
- Years active: 2010–present
- Agent: Aptepro

Toshinari Fukamachi (深町 寿成, Fukamachi Toshinari; born August 29) is a Japanese voice actor affiliated with Aptepro. Some of his notable roles include Hajime Nagumo in Arifureta: From Commonplace to World's Strongest, Genbu Kurono in The Idolmaster SideM, and Ard Meteor in The Greatest Demon Lord Is Reborn as a Typical Nobody.

== Filmography ==
=== Television animation ===
2016

- All Out!! as Taihei Noka

2017

- The Idolmaster SideM as Genbu Kurono

2018

- The Idolmaster SideM Wake Atte Mini! as Genbu Kurono

2019

- Ao-chan Can't Study! as Shuhei Yonezuka
- Arifureta: From Commonplace to World's Strongest as Hajime Nagumo

2020

- Tower of God as Hatz
- Yashahime as Ninja

2022

- Arifureta: From Commonplace to World's Strongest 2nd Season as Hajime Nagumo
- The Greatest Demon Lord Is Reborn as a Typical Nobody as Ard Meteor
- Boruto: Naruto Next Generations as Jibiki

2023

- The Fruit of Evolution 2 as Brood Lev Kaiser
- My Happy Marriage as Kazushi Tatsuishi
- Tearmoon Empire as Gain Remno

2024

- Arifureta: From Commonplace to World's Strongest 3rd Season as Hajime Nagumo

=== Video games ===
2014

- Freedom Wars as Noah, Benoit

2015

- Hortensia Saga: Aoi no Kishidan as Arnaud, Konstan, Rabi
- 100 Sleeping Princes and the Kingdom of Dreams as Grad

2016

- The Idolmaster SideM as Genbu Kurono

2017

- Kizuna Striker! as Rei Shiwasu

2018

- Dream!ing as Issei Torasawa
- On Air! as Yukiya Amahashi
- Caravan Stories as Riardo

2019

- The King of Fighters for Girls as Andy Bogard

2020

- Touken Ranbu: Online as Jizou Yukihira
- Octopath Traveler: Champions of the Continent as Durand

2021

- Gate of Nightmares as Sigma
- World Flipper as Tōru Sengaku

2022

- The Thousand Musketeers: Rhodoknight as Murata
- Witch on the Holy Night as Tobimaru Tsukiji

2023

- TEVI as Erasmus, Ian

2024

- Astra: Knights of Veda as Edward, Marthel
- 18Trip as Yukikaze Kamina

2025

- Pokémon Masters EX as Shumei

=== Drama CD ===
2014

- Servamp as Sakuya Watanuki
