= 2023 in anime =

Events in 2023 in anime.

== Releases ==
=== Films ===
A list of anime films that were released in theaters between January 1 and December 31, 2023.

Release date	Title	Studio	Director(s)	Running time (minutes)	Ref
January 20	Aikatsu! Mirai e no Starway	Bandai Namco Pictures	Ryūichi Kimura	72	
January 20	Fafner in the Azure: Behind the Line	Production I.G	Takashi Noto	54	
January 20	SSSS.Gridman	Studio Trigger	Yoshiyuki Kaneko	125	
January 27	Gold Kingdom and Water Kingdom	Madhouse	Kotono Watanabe	117	
February 17	Blue Giant	NUT	Yuzuru Tachikawa	119	
February 17	Sasaki and Miyano: Graduation	Studio Deen	Shinji Ishihira	59	
March 3	Doraemon: Nobita's Sky Utopia	Shin-Ei Animation	Takumi Doyama	107	
March 10	SSSS.Dynazenon	Studio Trigger	Yoshihiro Miyajima	121	
March 24	Gekijōban Argonavis Axia	Sanzigen	Shigeru Morikawa	64	
March 24	Gridman Universe	Studio Trigger	Akira Amemiya	118	
March 31	Rakudai Majo: Fūka to Yami no Majo	Production I.G	Takayuki Hamana	59	
April 7	Princess Principal: Crown Handler – Chapter 3	Actas	Masaki Tachibana	60	
April 14	Detective Conan: Black Iron Submarine	TMS Entertainment	Yuzuru Tachikawa	109	
May 12	Psycho-Pass Providence	Production I.G	Naoyoshi Shiotani	120	
May 20	Gekijōban Idolish7 Live 4bit Beyond the Period	Orange	Hiroshi Nishikiori; Kensuke Yamamoto	180	
May 26	Gekijōban Collar × Malice Deep Cover (part 1)	Studio Deen	Hiroshi Watanabe	55	
May 26	The Feast of Amrita		Saku Sakamoto	47	
June 9	Sailor Moon Cosmos (part 1)	Toei Animation; Studio Deen	Tomoya Takahashi	80	
June 16	Black Clover: Sword of the Wizard King	Pierrot	Ayataka Tanemura	110	
June 23	Gekijōban Collar × Malice Deep Cover (part 2)	Studio Deen	Hiroshi Watanabe	55	
June 23	Rascal Does Not Dream of a Sister Venturing Out	CloverWorks	Sōichi Masui	73	
June 30	Sailor Moon Cosmos (part 2)	Toei Animation; Studio Deen	Tomoya Takahashi	80	
July 2	Fate/strange Fake: Whispers of Dawn	A-1 Pictures	Shun Enokido; Takahito Sakazume	55	
July 14	The Boy and the Heron	Studio Ghibli	Hayao Miyazaki	125	
July 14	The Quintessential Quintuplets∽	Shaft	Yukihiro Miyamoto	48	
July 21	Mr. Osomatsu: The Soul's Takoyaki Party and the Legendary Sleepover Party	Pierrot	Hikaru Yamaguchi	58	
August 4	Shin Jigen! Crayon Shin-chan The Movie Chōnōryoku Dai Kessen: Tobetobe Temakizushi	Shirogumi	Hitoshi Ōne	94	
August 8	The Seven Deadly Sins: Grudge of Edinburgh (part 2)	Alfred Imageworks; Marvy Jack	Noriyuki Abe (Chief); Bob Shirahata	54	
August 18	Sand Land	Sunrise; Kamikaze Douga; Anima	Toshihisa Yokoshima	105	
September 8	City Hunter The Movie: Angel Dust	Sunrise; The Answer Studio	Kenji Kodama (Chief); Kazuyoshi Takeuchi	94	
September 15	Maboroshi	MAPPA	Mari Okada; Seimei Kidokoro	111	
September 15	Precure All Stars F	Toei Animation	Yūta Tanaka	72	
October 6	Girls und Panzer das Finale: Part 4	Actas	Tsutomu Mizushima	54	
October 13	Kaina of the Great Snow Sea: Star Sage	Polygon Pictures	Hiroaki Ando	99	
October 20	The Concierge at Hokkyoku Department Store	Production I.G	Yoshimi Itazu	70	
October 27	Digimon Adventure 02: The Beginning	Yumeta Company	Tomohisa Taguchi	80	
November 3	Phoenix: Reminiscence of Flower	Studio 4°C	Shōjirō Nishimi	95	
November 10	Komada: A Whisky Family	P.A. Works	Masayuki Yoshihara	91	
November 17	Birth of Kitarō: The Mystery of GeGeGe	Toei Animation	Gō Koga	104	
November 23	Gekijōban Pole Princess!!	Tatsunoko Production	Hitomi Ezoe	75	
November 23	Gekijōban Sylvanian Families: Freya Kara no Okurimono		Kazuya Konaka	65	
November 23	Ghost in the Shell: SAC_2045 The Last Human	Production I.G; Sola Digital Arts	Kenji Kamiyama (Chief); Shinji Aramaki (Chief); Michihito Fujii	126	
December 1	Rascal Does Not Dream of a Knapsack Kid	CloverWorks	Sōichi Masui	75	
December 8	My Next Life as a Villainess: All Routes Lead to Doom! The Movie	Silver Link	Keisuke Inoue	90	
December 8	Totto-Chan: The Little Girl at the Window	Shin-Ei Animation	Shinnosuke Yakuwa	114	
December 15	The Imaginary	Studio Ponoc	Yoshiyuki Momose	105	
December 22	Spy × Family Code: White	Wit Studio; CloverWorks	Takashi Katagiri	110	

=== Television series ===
A list of anime television series that debuted between January 1 and December 31, 2023.

First run start and end dates	Title	Episodes	Studio	Director(s)	Original title	Ref
January 4 – March 22	The Ice Guy and His Cool Female Colleague	12	Zero-G; Liber	Mankyū	Kōri Zokusei Danshi to Cool na Dōryō Joshi	
January 4 – March 22	The Magical Revolution of the Reincarnated Princess and the Genius Young Lady	12	Diomedéa	Shingo Tamaki	Tensei Ōjo to Tensai Reijō no Mahō Kakumei	
January 4 – March 29	Bungo Stray Dogs (season 4)	13	Bones	Takuya Igarashi		
January 5 – March 29	Tomo-chan Is a Girl!	13	Lay-duce	Hitoshi Nanba	Tomo-chan wa Onnanoko!	
January 5 – March 23	Onimai: I'm Now Your Sister!	12	Studio Bind	Shingo Fujii	Onii-chan wa Oshimai!	
January 5 – March 30	Spy Classroom (season 1)	12	Feel	Keiichiro Kawaguchi	Spy Kyōshitsu	
January 5 – March 29	Technoroid Overmind	12	Doga Kobo	Ka Hee Im	Tekunoroido OVERMIND	
January 5 – March 29	Tsurune: The Linking Shot	13	Kyoto Animation	Takuya Yamamura	Tsurune: Tsunagari no Issha	
January 5 – March 23	Revenger	12	Ajia-do Animation Works	Masaya Fujimori	Ribenjā	
January 6 – March 24	The Iceblade Sorcerer Shall Rule the World	12	Cloud Hearts	Masahiro Takata	Hyōken no Majutsushi ga Sekai o Suberu: Sekai Saikyō no Majutsushi de Aru Shōnen wa, Majutsu Gakuin ga Nyūgaku Suru	
January 6 – March 24	Nijiyon Animation	12	Bandai Namco Filmworks	Yūya Horiuchi	Niji yon anime-shon	
January 6 – March 24	Farming Life in Another World	12	Zero-G	Ryōichi Kuraya	Isekai Nonbiri Nōka	
January 6 – March 24	Sugar Apple Fairy Tale (part 1)	12	J.C.Staff	Yōhei Suzuki	Shugā Appuru Fearī Teiru	
January 7 – April 1	The Reincarnation of the Strongest Exorcist in Another World	13	Studio Blanc	Nobuyoshi Nagayama (Chief); Ryōsuke Shibuya	Saikyō Onmyōji no Isekai Tenseiki	
January 7 – March 25	Giant Beasts of Ars	12	Asahi Production	Akira Oguro	Ars no Kyojū	
January 7 – March 25	My Life as Inukai-san's Dog	12	Quad	Takashi Andō	Inu ni Nattara Suki na Hito ni Hirowareta	
January 7 – March 25	The Angel Next Door Spoils Me Rotten	12	Project No.9	Lihua Wang	Otonari no Tenshi-sama ni Itsu no Ma ni ka Dame Ningen ni Sareteita Ken	
January 7 – April 1	Buddy Daddies	12	P.A. Works	Yoshiyuki Asai		
January 7 – March 25	Trigun Stampede	12	Orange	Kenji Mutō		
January 7 – March 18	Is It Wrong to Try to Pick Up Girls in a Dungeon? (season 4, part 2)	11	J.C.Staff	Hideki Tachibana	Dungeon ni Deai o Motomeru no wa Machigatteiru Darō ka?	
January 7 – March 25	Endo and Kobayashi Live! The Latest on Tsundere Villainess Lieselotte	12	Tezuka Productions	Fumihiro Yoshimura	Tsundere Akuyaku Reijō Rīzerotte to Jikkyō no Endō-kun to Kaisetsu no Kobayashi-san	
January 7 – April 15	UniteUp!	12	CloverWorks	Shin'ichirō Ushijima		
January 7 – March 25	Chillin' in My 30s After Getting Fired from the Demon King's Army	12	Encourage Films	Fumitoshi Oizaki	Kaiko Sareta Ankoku Heishi (30-Dai) no Slow na Second Life	
January 8 – March 26	Saving 80,000 Gold in Another World for My Retirement	12	Felix Film	Hiroshi Tamada	Rōgo ni Sonaete Isekai de 8-Man-Mai no Kinka o Tamemasu	
January 8 – April 2	The Tale of the Outcasts	13	Ashi Productions	Yasutaka Yamamoto	Nokemono-tachi no Yoru	
January 8 – July 23	Nier: Automata Ver1.1a	12	A-1 Pictures	Ryouji Masuyama		
January 8 – March 26	The Legend of Heroes: Trails of Cold Steel – Northern War	12	Tatsunoko Production	Hidekazu Sato	The Legend of Heroes: Sen no Kiseki Northern War	
January 8 – September 24	The Misfit of Demon King Academy (season 2, part 1)	12	Silver Link	Shin Oonuma (Chief); Masafumi Tamura	Maō Gakuin no Futekigōsha	
January 8 – April 2	Tokyo Revengers: Christmas Showdown	13	Liden Films	Koichi Hatsumi	Tokyo Revengers: Seiya Kessen-hen	
January 8 – March 26	Don't Toy with Me, Miss Nagatoro 2nd Attack	12	OLM	Shinji Ushiro	Ijiranaide, Nagatoro-san 2nd Attack	
January 8 – March 26	Handyman Saitou in Another World	12	C2C	Toshiyuki Kubooka	Benriya Saitō-san, Isekai ni Iku	
January 9 – March 27	High Card	12	Studio Hibari	Junichi Wada		
January 9 – March 13	Show Time! (season 2)	8	Rabbit Gate	Satoshi Miura	Showtime! ~Uta no O-nee-san Datte Shitai~	
January 9 – April 3	Ippon Again!	13	Bakken Record	Ken Ogiwara	Mō Ippon!	
January 9 – March 27	The Vampire Dies in No Time (season 2)	12	Madhouse	Hiroshi Kōjina	Kyūketsuki Sugu Shinu	
January 9 – April 3	KJ File (season 2)	13	ILCA yell	Akira Funada		
January 9 – March 26	By the Grace of the Gods (season 2)	12	Maho Film	Takeyuki Yanase	Kami-tachi ni Hirowareta Otoko	
January 9 – March 27	In/Spectre (season 2)	12	Brain's Base	Keiji Gotoh	Kyokō Suiri	
January 10 – March 28	Ningen Fushin: Adventurers Who Don't Believe in Humanity Will Save the World	12	Geek Toys	Itsuki Imazaki	Ningen Fushin no Bōkensha-tachi ga Sekai o Sukū Yō Desu	
January 10 – June 20	Kubo Won't Let Me Be Invisible	12	Pine Jam	Kazuomi Koga	Kubo-san wa Mob o Yurusanai	
January 10 – March 28	Reborn to Master the Blade: From Hero-King to Extraordinary Squire	12	Studio Comet	Naoyuki Kuzuya	Eiyū-Ō, Bu o Kiwameru Tame Tensei-Su: Soshite, Sekai Saikyō no Minarai Kishi	
January 10 – March 28	Malevolent Spirits: Mononogatari (part 1)	12	Bandai Namco Pictures	Ryuichi Kimura	Mononogatari	
January 10 – June 20	Vinland Saga (season 2)	24	MAPPA	Shūhei Yabuta		
January 10 – September 26	Ayakashi Triangle	12	Connect	Noriaki Akitaya	Ayakashi Toraianguru	
January 11 – March 29	Campfire Cooking in Another World with My Absurd Skill	12	MAPPA	Kiyoshi Matsuda	Tondemo Skill de Isekai Hōrō Meshi	
January 11 – April 19	Bofuri (season 2)	12	Silver Link	Shin Oonuma	Itai no wa Iya nano de Bōgyoryoku ni Kyokufuri Shitai to Omoimasu.	
January 12 – March 22	Kaina of the Great Snow Sea	11	Polygon Pictures	Hiroaki Ando	Ōyukiumi no Kaina	
January 13 – March 31	D4DJ All Mix	12	Sanzigen	Seiji Mizushima (Chief); Daisuke Suzuki		
January 14 – April 1	The Fruit of Evolution (season 2)	12	Hotline	Yoshiaki Okumura (Chief); Shige Fukase	Shinka no Mi: Shiranai Uchi ni Kachigumi Jinsei	
January 14 – April 1	Cardfight!! Vanguard: will+Dress (Season 2)	12	Kinema Citrus	Ken Mori (Chief) Ryūtarō Suzuki		
January 14 – March 18	The Fire Hunter	10	Signal.MD	Junji Nishimura	Hikari no Ō	
January 17 – January 31	Flaglia	6	Gaina	Itsuro Kawasaki	"FLAGLIA"~ Natsu Yasumi no monogatari ~	
January 18 – April 5	Sorcerous Stabber Orphen: Chaos in Urbanrama	12	Studio Deen	Takayuki Hamana	Majutsushi Orphen Haguretabi: Urbanrama-hen	
February 5 – January 28, 2024	Soaring Sky! Pretty Cure	50	Toei Animation	Koji Ogawa	Hirogaru Sky! Pretty Cure	
March 4	Attack on Titan: The Final Season (part 3)	1	MAPPA	Yuichiro Hayashi	Shingeki no Kyōjin: The Final Season	
March 21 – March 28	Heart Cocktail Colorful: Haru-hen	5			Hāto kakuteru karafuru haru-hen	
March 21 – March 27	Yomawari Neko	15	Shogakukan Music & Digital Entertainment	Kazuma Taketani		
March 22 -	Shuwawan!		KOO-KI	Motohiro Shirakawa	Shi~yuwawan!	
April 1 – June 24	Chibi Godzilla Raids Again	13	Pie in the Sky	Taketo Shinkai	Chibi Godzilla no Gyakushū	
April 1 – June 24	Heavenly Delusion	13	Production I.G	Hirotaka Mori	Tengoku Daimakyō	
April 1 – July 1	Hell's Paradise: Jigokuraku	13	MAPPA	Kaori Makita	Jigokuraku	
April 1 – September 23	Mix (season 2)	24	OLM	Tomohiro Kamitani		
April 2 – October 1	Edens Zero (season 2)	25	J.C.Staff	Shinji Ishihira (Chief); Toshinori Watanabe		
April 2 – June 18	My Home Hero	12	Tezuka Productions	Takashi Kamei	Mai Hōmu Hīrō	
April 2 – June 25	My Love Story with Yamada-kun at Lv999	13	Madhouse	Morio Asaka	Yamada-kun to Lv999 no Koi o Suru	
April 2 – June 18	The Dangers in My Heart	12	Shin-Ei Animation	Hiroaki Akagi	Boku no Kokoro no Yabai Yatsu	
April 2 –	Tōsōchū: The Great Mission		Toei Animation	Yukio Kaizawa; Kōhei Kureta		
April 3 – September 14	Bosanimal	96	maroyaka; soket; ODDJOB Inc.	Isamu Ueno		
April 3 – June 19	In Another World with My Smartphone (season 2)	12	J.C.Staff	Yoshiaki Iwasaki	Isekai wa Smartphone to Tomo ni	
April 3 – June 19	Kuma Kuma Kuma Bear Punch!	12	EMT Squared	Hisashi Ishii; Yuu Nobuta	Kuma kuma kuma beā pa-nchi!	
April 3 – June 19	The Aristocrat's Otherworldly Adventure: Serving Gods Who Go Too Far	12	EMT Squared; Magic Bus	Noriyuki Nakamura	Tensei Kizoku no Isekai Bōken Roku	
April 4 – June 20	Alice Gear Aegis Expansion	12	Nomad	Hirokazu Hanai	Arisu gia aigisu ekisupanshon	
April 4 – June 20	Kizuna no Allele	12	Wit Studio; Signal.MD	Kenichiro Komaya	Kizuna no Ariru	
April 4 – June 20	Skip and Loafer	12	P.A. Works	Kotomi Deai	Skip to Loafer	
April 4 – July 11	YouTuNya	15	Lesprit	Kyō Yatate	Yūchūnyā	
April 5 – June 21	Tokyo Mew Mew New (season 2)	12	Yumeta Company; Graphinica	Takahiro Natori		
April 6 – June 15	Dr. Stone: New World (part 1)	11	TMS Entertainment	Shūhei Matsushita		
April 6 – July 6	KamiKatsu: Working for God in a Godless World	12	Studio Palette	Yuki Inaba	Kaminaki Sekai no Kamisama Katsudō	
April 6 – June 22	KonoSuba: An Explosion on This Wonderful World!	12	Drive	Yujiro Abe	Kono Subarashii Sekai ni Bakuen o!	
April 6 – June 22	The Ancient Magus' Bride (season 2, part 1)	12	Studio Kafka	Kazuaki Terasawa	Mahō Tsukai no Yome	
April 6 – June 28	The Idolmaster Cinderella Girls U149	12	CygamesPictures	Manabu Okamoto	Aidorumasutā Shinderera Gāruzu U149	
April 6 – June 22	Yuri Is My Job!	12	Passione; Studio Lings	Hijiri Sanpei	Watashi no Yuri wa Oshigoto Desu!	
April 7 – June 30	I Got a Cheat Skill in Another World and Became Unrivaled in the Real World, Too	13	Millepensee	Shin Itagaki (Chief); Shingo Tanabe	Isekai de Cheat Skill o Te ni Shita Ore wa, Genjitsu Sekai o mo Musō Suru: Level Up wa Jinsei o Kaeta	
April 7 – June 23	Opus Colors	12	C-Station	Shunsuke Tada	Ōpasu karāzu	
April 7 – June 23	The Legendary Hero Is Dead!	12	Liden Films	Rion Kujo	Yūsha ga Shinda!	
April 7 – June 23	Too Cute Crisis	12	SynergySP	Jun Hatori	Kawaisugi Crisis	
April 8 – June 24	Birdie Wing: Golf Girls' Story (season 2)	12	Bandai Namco Pictures	Takayuki Inagaki		
April 8 – June 24	Magical Destroyers	12	Bibury Animation Studios	Hiroshi Ikehata	Mahō Shōjo Magical Destroyers	
April 8 – July 1	Mashle: Magic and Muscles	12	A-1 Pictures	Tomoya Tanaka	Masshuru	
April 8 – June 24	My One-Hit Kill Sister	12	Gekkō	Hiroaki Takagi	Isekai One Turn Kill Nee-san: Ane Dōhan no Isekai Seikatsu Hajimemashita	
April 8 – June 24	Otaku Elf	12	C2C	Takebumi Anzai	Edomae Elf	
April 8 – June 24	Rokudo's Bad Girls	12	Satelight	Keiya Saitō	Rokudō no Onna-tachi	
April 8 – June 24	The Café Terrace and Its Goddesses	12	Tezuka Productions	Satoshi Kuwabara	Megami no Café Terrace	
April 8 – June 24	Tonikawa: Over the Moon for You (season 2)	12	Seven Arcs	Hiroshi Ikehata	Tonikaku Kawaii	
April 9 – June 25	A Galaxy Next Door	12	Asahi Production	Ryuichi Kimura	Otonari ni Ginga	
April 9 – October 8	Blue Orchestra	24	Nippon Animation	Seiji Kishi	Ao no Orchestra	
April 9 – June 18	Demon Slayer: Kimetsu no Yaiba – Swordsmith Village Arc	11	Ufotable	Haruo Sotozaki	Kimetsu no Yaiba: Katanakaji no Sato-hen	
April 9 – July 2	Mobile Suit Gundam: The Witch from Mercury (season 2)	12	Bandai Namco Filmworks	Hiroshi Kobayashi; Ryo Ando	Kidō Senshi Gundam: Suisei no Majo	
April 9 – July 2	My Clueless First Friend	13	Studio Signpost	Shigenori Kageyama	Jijō o Shiranai Tenkōsei ga Guigui Kuru	
April 9 – June 25	Summoned to Another World for a Second Time	12	Studio Elle	Motoki Nakanishi	Isekai Shōkan wa Nidome Desu	
April 9 – June 25	World Dai Star	12	Lerche	Yū Kinome		
April 10 – June 26	Why Raeliana Ended Up at the Duke's Mansion	12	Typhoon Graphics	Junichi Yamamoto	Kanojo ga Kōshaku-Tei ni Itta Riyū	
April 11 – June 27	Dead Mount Death Play (part 1)	12	Geek Toys	Manabu Ono		
April 11 – July 4	Insomniacs After School	13	Liden Films	Yūki Ikeda	Kimi wa Hōkago Insomnia	
April 12 – June 28	Oshi no Ko	11	Doga Kobo	Daisuke Hiramaki		
April 12 – June 27	The Marginal Service	12	3Hz	Masayuki Sakoi		
April 14 – June 16	Ranking of Kings: The Treasure Chest of Courage	10	Wit Studio	Yōsuke Hatta	Ōsama Ranking: Yūki no Takarabako	
April 20 – September 28	Sacrificial Princess and the King of Beasts	24	J.C.Staff	Chiaki Kon	Niehime to Kemono no Ō	
May 17 – September 27	Mamekichi Mameko NEET no Nichijō (season 2)	39	Tezuka Productions	Satoshi Kuwabara		
June 29 – September 14	BanG Dream! It's MyGO!!!!!	13	Sanzigen	Kōdai Kakimoto	Bandori! It's MyGO!!!!!	
July 1 – September 23	Horimiya: The Missing Pieces	13	CloverWorks	Masashi Ishihama	Horimiya: Piece	
July 2 – October 1	Am I Actually the Strongest?	12	Staple Entertainment	Takashi Naoya	Jitsu wa Ore, Saikyō deshita?	
July 2 – September 17	Atelier Ryza: Ever Darkness & the Secret Hideout	12	Liden Films	Ema Yuzuhira	Ryza no Atelier: Tokoyami no Joō to Himitsu no Kakurega	
July 2 – September 17	Ayaka: A Story of Bonds and Wounds	12	Studio Blanc	Nobuyoshi Nagayama		
July 2 – October 1	My Tiny Senpai	12	Project No.9	Mitsutoshi Satō	Uchi no Kaisha no Chiisai Senpai no Hanashi	
July 2 – September 24	Yohane the Parhelion: Sunshine in the Mirror	13	Sunrise	Asami Nakatani	Genjitsu no Yohane: Sunshine in the Mirror	
July 3 – September 18	Level 1 Demon Lord and One Room Hero	12	Silver Link; Blade	Keisuke Inoue	Lv1 Maō to One Room Yūsha	
July 3 – September 18	Masamune-kun's Revenge R	12	Silver Link	Mirai Minato	Masamune-kun no Revenge R	
July 3 – September 25	Mushoku Tensei: Jobless Reincarnation (season 2, part 1)	12	Studio Bind	Hiroki Hirano	Mushoku Tensei: Isekai Ittara Honki Dasu	
July 4 – September 19	Malevolent Spirits: Mononogatari (part 2)	12	Bandai Namco Pictures	Ryuichi Kimura	Mononogatari	
July 4 – September 19	Sweet Reincarnation	12	SynergySP	Naoyuki Kuzuya	Okashi na Tensei	
July 4 – September 19	The Dreaming Boy Is a Realist	12	Studio Gokumi; AXsiZ	Kazuomi Koga	Yumemiru Danshi wa Genjitsushugisha	
July 4 – September 26	The Girl I Like Forgot Her Glasses	13	GoHands	Susumu Kudo (Chief); Katsumasa Yokomine	Suki na Ko ga Megane o Wasureta	
July 5 – September 20	My Happy Marriage	12	Kinema Citrus	Takehiro Kubota	Watashi no Shiawase na Kekkon	
July 5 – September 20	Reborn as a Vending Machine, I Now Wander the Dungeon	12	Studio Gokumi; AXsiZ	Noriaki Akitaya	Jidōhanbaiki ni Umarekawatta Ore wa Meikyū ni Samayō	
July 6 – December 28	Jujutsu Kaisen (season 2)	23	MAPPA	Shōta Goshozono		
July 6 – September 28	Undead Girl Murder Farce	13	Lapin Track	Mamoru Hatakeyama	Andeddo Gāru Mādā Farusu	
July 7 – September 22	Hyakushō Kizoku	12	Pie in the sky	Yūtarō Sawada		
July 7 – December 15	Rurouni Kenshin	24	Liden Films	Hideyo Yamamoto	Rurōni Kenshin -Meiji Kenkaku Roman Tan-	
July 7 – September 22	Sugar Apple Fairy Tale (part 2)	12	J.C.Staff	Yōhei Suzuki		
July 7 – September 22	The Most Heretical Last Boss Queen: From Villainess to Savior	12	OLM Team Yoshioka	Norio Nitta	Higeki no Genkyō to naru Saikyō Gedō Last Boss Joō wa Min no tame ni Tsukushimasu.	
July 8 – September 30	Bleach: Thousand-Year Blood War (part 2)	13	Pierrot	Tomohisa Taguchi	Bleach: Sennen Kessen-hen	
July 8 – September 30	Ikimono-san	12	New Deer	Atsushi Wada		
July 8 – September 23	Liar, Liar	12	Geek Toys	Satoru Ono; Naoki Matsuura	Raiā Raiā	
July 8 – September 23	My Unique Skill Makes Me OP Even at Level 1	12	Maho Film	Takeyuki Yanase	Level 1 dakedo Unique Skill de Saikyō Desu	
July 8 – October 14	Reign of the Seven Spellblades	15	J.C.Staff	Masato Matsune	Nanatsu no Maken ga Shihai Suru	
July 8 – September 30	Rent-A-Girlfriend (season 3)	12	TMS Entertainment	Shinya Une	Kanojo, Okarishimasu	
July 8 – September 30	The Gene of AI	12	Madhouse	Yuzo Sato	AI no Idenshi	
July 8 – September 30	The Masterful Cat Is Depressed Again Today	13	GoHands	Susumu Kudo (Chief); Katsumasa Yokomine	Dekiru Neko wa Kyō mo Yūutsu	
July 9 – September 24	Classroom for Heroes	12	Actas	Keiichiro Kawaguchi	Eiyū Kyōshitsu	
July 9 – September 24	TenPuru	12	Gekkō	Kazuomi Koga		
July 9 – September 24	The Duke of Death and His Maid (season 2)	12	J.C.Staff	Yoshinobu Yamakawa	Shinigami Bocchan to Kuro Maid	
July 9 – December 25	Zom 100: Bucket List of the Dead	12	Bug Films	Kazuki Kawagoe	Zom 100: Zombie ni Naru made ni Shitai 100 no Koto	
July 10 – December 25	Dark Gathering	25	OLM Team Masuda	Hiroshi Ikehata	Dāku Gyazaringu	
July 11 – September 25	Synduality: Noir (part 1)	12	Eight Bit	Yūsuke Yamamoto		
July 12 – September 20	Bungo Stray Dogs (season 5)	11	Bones	Takuya Igarashi		
July 12 – December 20	Helck	24	Satelight	Tatsuo Sato		
July 13 – September 28	Saint Cecilia and Pastor Lawrence	12	Doga Kobo	Sumie Noro	Shiro Seijo to Kuro Bokushi	
July 13 – September 28	Spy Classroom (season 2)	12	Feel	Keiichiro Kawaguchi	Spy Kyōshitsu	
July 13 – September 28	The Devil Is a Part-Timer!! (part 2)	12	3Hz	Daisuke Tsukushi	Hataraku, Maō-sama!!	
July 14 – September 29	The Great Cleric	12	Yokohama Animation Laboratory; Cloud Hearts	Masato Tamagawa	Seija Musō	
September 2 – September 9	The Quintessential Quintuplets~	2	Shaft	Yukihiro Miyamoto	Gotōbun no Hanayome~	
September 10 – September 24	FLCL: Grunge	3	MontBlanc Pictures	Hitoshi Takekiyo		
September 25 – March 25, 2024	Chickip Dancers (season 3)	78	Fanworks	Rareko	Chikippu Dansāzu	
September 29 – December 22	A Girl & Her Guard Dog	13	Project No.9	Yoshihiro Takamoto	Ojō to Banken-kun	
September 29 – March 24, 2024	Frieren: Beyond Journey's End	28	Madhouse	Keiichirō Saitō	Sōsō no Frieren	
September 30 – March 23 2024	Firefighter Daigo: Rescuer in Orange	23	Brain's Base	Masahiko Murata	Megumi no Daigo: Kyūkoku no Orange	
October 1 – June 30, 2024	Captain Tsubasa: Junior Youth Arc	39	Studio Kai	Katsumi Ono	Captain Tsubasa Season 2: Junior Youth-hen	
October 1 – October 15	FLCL: Shoegaze	3	Production I.G; NUT	Yutaka Uemura		
October 1 – December 17	Overtake!	12	Troyca	Ei Aoki	Ōbāteiku!	
October 1 – March 31 2024	Ragna Crimson	24	Silver Link	Ken Takahashi	Raguna Kurimuzon	
October 1 – March 31, 2024	Shangri-La Frontier	25	C2C	Toshiyuki Kubooka	Shangri-La Frontier: Kusoge Hunter, Kamige ni Idoman to su	
October 1 – December 17	The Family Circumstances of the Irregular Witch	12	A-Real	Masahiro Takata	Dekoboko Majo no Oyako Jijō	
October 2 – December 18	B-Project Passion*Love Call	12	Asahi Production	Mutsumi Takeda	B-Project ~Netsuretsu*Love Call~	
October 2 – December 18	MF Ghost	12	Felix Film	Tomohito Naka	MF Gōsuto	
October 2 – December 25	Migi & Dali	13	Geek Toys; CompTown	Mankyū	Migi to Dali	
October 2 – December 25	Ron Kamonohashi's Forbidden Deductions (season 1)	13	Diomedéa	Shōta Ihata	Kamonohashi Ron no Kindan Suiri	
October 3 – December 19	A Playthrough of a Certain Dude's VRMMO Life	12	Maho Film	Yuichi Nakazawa	Toaru Ossan no VRMMO Katsudōki	
October 3 – December 19	I'm in Love with the Villainess	12	Platinum Vision	Hideaki Ōba	Watashi no Oshi wa Akuyaku Reijō	
October 3 – December 26	Paradox Live the Animation	12	Pine Jam	Naoya Ando		
October 3 – December 19	Shy	12	Eight Bit	Masaomi Andō		
October 3 – December 19	The Demon Sword Master of Excalibur Academy	12	Passione	Hiroyuki Morita	Seiken Gakuin no Makentsukai	
October 3 – December 19	The Saint's Magic Power Is Omnipotent (season 2)	12	Diomedéa	Shōta Ihata	Seijo no Maryoku wa Bannō Desu	
October 4 – December 20	Bullbuster	12	NUT	Hiroyasu Aoki	Burubasutā	
October 4 – December 20	I'm Giving the Disgraced Noble Lady I Rescued a Crash Course in Naughtiness	12	Zero-G; Digital Network Animation	Takashi Asami	Konyaku Haki Sareta Reijō o Hirotta Ore ga, Ikenai Koto o Oshiekomu	
October 4 – December 20	The Eminence in Shadow (season 2)	12	Nexus	Kazuya Nakanishi	Kage no Jitsuryokusha ni Naritakute!	
October 4 – December 26	Tokyo Revengers: Tenjiku Arc	13	Liden Films	Koichi Hatsumi	Tokyo Revengers: Tenjiku-hen	
October 5 – December 28	16bit Sensation: Another Layer	13	Studio Silver	Takashi Sakuma	16 Bitto sensēshon ANOTHER LAYER	
October 5 – December 21	Berserk of Gluttony	12	A.C.G.T	Tetsuya Yanagisawa	Bōshoku no Berserk: Ore dake Level to Iu Gainen o Toppa Suru	
October 5 – December 21	Bikkuri-Men	12	Shin-Ei Animation; Lesprit	Tomohiro Tsukimisato		
October 5 – December 21	KamiErabi God.app	12	Unend	Hiroyuki Seshita	Kamierabi	
October 5 – December 21	Kizuna no Allele (season 2)	12	Signal.MD; Wit Studio	Kenichiro Komaya	Kizuna no Ariru	
October 5 – December 21	The Ancient Magus' Bride (season 2, part 2)	12	Studio Kafka	Kazuaki Terasawa	Mahō Tsukai no Yome	
October 5 – December 21	The Yuzuki Family's Four Sons	12	Shuka	Mitsuru Hongo	Yuzuki-san Chi no Yon Kyōdai	
October 5 – December 28	Umamusume: Pretty Derby (season 3)	13	Studio Kai	Kei Oikawa	Umamusume Puritī Dābī	
October 6 –	Beyblade X		OLM	Katsuhito Akiyama (Chief); Sotsu Terada		
October 6 – December 22	Goblin Slayer (season 2)	12	Liden Films	Takaharu Ozaki (Chief); Misato Takada	Goburin Sureiyā	
October 6 – December 29	My Daughter Left the Nest and Returned an S-Rank Adventurer	13	Typhoon Graphics	Takeshi Mori (Chief); Naoki Murata	Bōkensha ni Naritai to Miyako ni Deteitta Musume ga S-Rank ni Natteta	
October 6 – December 22	Our Dating Story: The Experienced You and the Inexperienced Me	12	ENGI	Hideaki Ōba	Keiken Zumi na Kimi to, Keiken Zero na Ore ga, Otsukiai Suru Hanashi	
October 6 – December 29	Rail Romanesque (season 2)	13	Yokohama Animation Laboratory	Michiru Ebira		
October 6 – December 22	The Rising of the Shield Hero (season 3)	12	Kinema Citrus	Hitoshi Haga	Tate no Yūsha no Nariagari	
October 6 – December 22	Under Ninja	12	Tezuka Productions	Satoshi Kuwabara	Andā Ninja	
October 7 – November 24	Arknights: Perish in Frost	8	Yostar Pictures	Yuki Watanabe	Arknights: Fuyukomori Kaerimichi	
October 7 – December 23	Girlfriend, Girlfriend (season 2)	12	SynergySP	Takatoshi Suzuki	Kanojo mo Kanojo	
October 7 – December 30	Hypnosis Mic: Division Rap Battle: Rhyme Anima+	13	A-1 Pictures	Katsumi Ono	Hipunoshisu Maiku: Division Rap Battle: Rhyme Anima	
October 7 – December 23	Matsuinu	12	Point Pictures	Tetsuya Endo	Osomatsu-san	
October 7 – December 23	My New Boss Is Goofy	12	A-1 Pictures	Noriyuki Abe	Atarashii Jōshi wa Do Tennen	
October 7 – December 23	Power of Hope: PreCure Full Bloom	12	Toei Animation; Studio Deen	Takayuki Hamana	Kibō no Chikara: Otona Precure 23	
October 7 – December 23	Spy × Family (season 2)	12	Wit Studio; CloverWorks	Kazuhiro Furuhashi		
October 7 – December 23	The Faraway Paladin: The Lord of Rust Mountain	12	OLM; Sunrise Beyond	Akira Iwanaga	Saihate no Paladin: Tetsusabi no Yama no Ō	
October 7 – December 23	The Kingdoms of Ruin	12	Yokohama Animation Laboratory	Keitaro Motonaga	Hametsu no Ōkoku	
October 7 – December 30	The Vexations of a Shut-In Vampire Princess	12	Project No.9	Tatsuma Minamikawa	Hikikomari Kyūketsuki no Monmon	
October 7 – March 23, 2024	Undead Unluck	24	David Production	Yuki Yase	Andeddo Anrakku	
October 8 – December 24	A Returner's Magic Should Be Special	12	Arvo Animation	Taishi Kawaguchi	Kikansha no Mahō wa Tokubetsu Desu	
October 8 – February 6, 2024	Butareba: The Story of a Man Turned into a Pig	12	Project No.9	Masayuki Takahashi	Buta no Liver wa Kanetsu Shiro	
October 8 – March 31, 2024	The Seven Deadly Sins: Four Knights of the Apocalypse (season 1)	24	Telecom Animation Film	Maki Odaira	Nanatsu no Taizai: Mokushiroku no Yonkishi	
October 8 – December 24	I Shall Survive Using Potions!	12	Jumondou	Nobuaki Nakanishi	Potion-danomi de Ikinobimasu!	
October 8 – December 24	Protocol: Rain	12	Quad	Yasutaka Yamamoto (Chief); Daishi Kato	Bokura no Ameiro Protocol	
October 8 – December 24	Tearmoon Empire	12	Silver Link	Yūshi Ibe	Tearmoon Teikoku Monogatari: Dantōdai kara Hajimaru, Hime no Tensei Gyakuten Story	
October 8 – December 24	The 100 Girlfriends Who Really, Really, Really, Really, Really Love You	12	Bibury Animation Studios	Hikaru Sato	Kimi no Koto ga Dai Dai Dai Dai Daisuki na 100-nin no Kanojo	
October 8 – April 7, 2024	The Diary of Ochibi-san	24	Studio Khara	Daisuke Onizuka; Shogo Tsurii	Ochibi-san	
October 8 – December 24	The Idolmaster Million Live!	12	Shirogumi	Shinya Watada	Aidorumasutā Mirion Raibu!	
October 9 – January 15, 2024	Kawagoe Boys Sing	12	evg	Jun Matsumoto	Kawagoe Bōizu Shingu	
October 9 – December 25	Stardust Telepath	12	Studio Gokumi	Kaori	Hoshikuzu Telepath	
October 10 – December 26	Dead Mount Death Play (part 2)	12	Geek Toys	Yoshihiro Satsuma	Deddomaunto Desupurei	
October 12 – December 21	Dr. Stone: New World (part 2)	11	TMS Entertainment	Shūhei Matsushita		
October 13 – November 3	After-School Hanako-kun	4	Lerche	Masaki Kitamura	Hōkago Shōnen Hanako-kun	
October 22 – March 18, 2024	Dog Signal	20	Fugaku	Kazuhiro Furuhashi		
October 22 – March 24, 2024	The Apothecary Diaries	24	Toho Animation Studio; OLM	Norihiro Naganuma	Kusuriya no Hitorigoto	
October 4 – December 27	Shinobanai! CryptoNinja Sakuya	13	Fanworks	Akifumi Nonaka		
November 5	Attack on Titan: The Final Season (part 4)	1	MAPPA	Yuichiro Hayashi	Shingeki no Kyōjin: The Final Season	
December 26	Dropkick on My Devil! Apocalypse Arc	1	Makaria		Jashin-chan wa Dropkick: Seikimatsu-hen	
December 12	Umi no Minwa no Machi	25	Tomason	Shinnosuke Numata		

=== Original net animations ===
A list of original net animations that debuted between January 1 and December 31, 2023.

First run start and end dates	Title	Episodes	Studio	Director(s)	Original title	Ref
January 1	The Way of the Househusband (season 2)	5	J.C.Staff	Chiaki Kon	Gokushufudō	
January 11 – March 14	Oh, Suddenly Egyptian God (season 2)	10	Typhoon Graphics	Katsuya Kikuchi	Tōtotsu ni Egypt Kami	
January 13 – April 3	Pole Princess!!	7	Tatsunoko Production	Hitomi Ezoe; Yoshihiro Otobe	Pōru Purinsesu!!	
January 19	Junji Ito Maniac: Japanese Tales of the Macabre	12	Studio Deen	Shinobu Tagashira	Itō Junji Maniakku	
January 26 – July 12	Record of Ragnarok (season 2)	15	Graphinica; Yumeta Company	Masao Ōkubo	Shūmatsu no Walküre	
January 27	Lupin the 3rd vs. Cat's Eye	1	TMS Entertainment	Kōbun Shizuno; Hiroyuki Seshita	Rupan-sansei VS Kyattsu ai	
February 2	Make My Day	8	5 Inc.	Makoto Honda		
February 4 – July 30	Fate/Grand Order: Fujimaru Ritsuka Doesn't Get It	33	DLE	Tsuchida	Feito/Grand Order: Fujimaru Tatsuka wa wakaranai	
February 16	Aggretsuko (season 5)	10	Fanworks	Rareko		
February 17 – March 31	Kuromi's Pretty Journey	21	Imagica Digitalscape; Qzil.LA	Sachi Miura		
March 8 – November 15	Nights with a Cat (season 2)	30	Studio Puyukai	Minoru Ashina	Yoru wa Neko to Issho	
March 10 – March 24	Shitasaki Kara Koi	3	Aqua Aris	Yoshitomo		
March 21 – March 28	Petit Cool Doji Danshi no Hitokoma	2	Aqua Aris	Yū Hayata		
April 3 – June 5	Sazanami Sōshi ni Junketsu o Sasagu	8	Studio Hōkiboshi	Sanae Nagi		
April 6 – April 11	Ensemble Stars!! Tsuioku Selection "Element"	6	Dandelion Animation Studio	Osamu Yamasaki	Ansanburu sutāzu!! Tsuioku serekushon "eremento"	
April 16 – May 7	Umamusume: Pretty Derby – Road to the Top	4	CygamesPictures	Chengzhi Liao	Umamusume Puritī Dābī: Road to the Top	
May 11	Ultraman (season 3)	12	Production I.G; Sola Digital Arts	Kenji Kamiyama; Shinji Aramaki		
May 18	Yakitori: Soldiers of Misfortune	6	Arect	Hideki Anbo	Yakitori	
June 29	Ōoku: The Inner Chambers	10	Studio Deen	Noriyuki Abe	Ōoku	
July 1 – September 23	Cute Executive Officer R	13	Project No.9	Kazuya Iwata	Youjo Shachou R	
July 12 – August 23	Tonikawa: Over the Moon for You – High School Days	4	Seven Arcs	Hiroshi Ikehata	Tonikaku Kawaii: Joshikō-hen	
July 26 – August 24	Baki Hanma (season 2)	27	TMS Entertainment	Toshiki Hirano		
July 31	Bastard!! -Heavy Metal, Dark Fantasy-:Hell's Requiem	15	Liden Films	Takaharu Ozaki	Bastard!! Ankoku no Hakaishin: Jigoku no Chinkonka-hen	
August 1 – May 10, 2024	Odekake Kozame	60	ENGI	Marina Maki		
August 10 – October 19	Amaim Warrior at the Borderline: UltraSteel Ogre-Gear	6	Sunrise Beyond	Masami Ōbari	Kyōkai Senki: Kyokkō no Sōki	
September 6 – December 13	Pokémon: Paldean Winds	4	Wit Studio	Ryohei Takeshita	Hōkago no Breath	
September 7	Gamera Rebirth	6	ENGI	Hiroyuki Seshita		
September 13	Phoenix: Eden17	4	Studio 4°C	Shōjirō Nishimi	Hi no Tori: Eden no Sora	
September 21	Kengan Ashura (season 2)	12	Larx Entertainment	Seiji Kishi		
October 5 –	I.Cinnamoroll		J.C.Staff	Miyuki Ishida		
October 6 – October 20	Gundam Build Metaverse	3	Sunrise Beyond	Masami Ōbari	Gandamu Birudo Metabāzu	
October 12	Good Night World	12	NAZ	Katsuya Kikuchi	Guddo Naito Wārudo	
October 26	Pluto	8	Studio M2	Toshio Kawaguchi		
November 1	That Time I Got Reincarnated as a Slime: Coleus' Dream	3	Eight Bit	Atsushi Nakayama	Tensei shita Slime datta Ken: Coleus no Yume	
November 2	Onimusha	8	Sublimation	Takashi Miike (Chief); Shinya Sugai		
November 9	Akuma-kun	12	Encourage Films; Toei Animation	Junichi Sato (Chief); Fumitoshi Oizaki		
November 17	Scott Pilgrim Takes Off	8	Science Saru	Abel Góngora		
November 28	Onmyōji	13	Marvy Jack	Soubi Yamamoto		
December 28	Pokémon Concierge		Dwarf Studios	Iku Ogawa		

=== Original video animations ===
A list of original video animations that debuted between January 1 and December 31, 2023.

First run start and end dates	Title	Episodes	Studio	Director(s)	Original title	Ref
March 29	Nijiyon Animation	3	Bandai Namco Filmworks	Yūya Horiuchi	Niji yon animeshon	
April 26	Hyperdimension Neptunia: Hidamari no Little Purple	1	Okuruto Noboru	Masahiro Mukai		
May 24	Stand My Heroes: Warmth of Memories	1	M.S.C	Hitomi Ezoe	Sutando mai hīrōzu WARMTH OF memorī	
May 26 – October 27	Tenchi Muyo! GXP Paradise Shidō-hen	6	AIC; Saber Project; Digital Network Animation	Hiroshi Negishi (Chief); Takashi Asami		
June 23	Love Live! Nijigasaki High School Idol Club Next Sky	1	Bandai Namco Filmworks	Tomoyuki Kawamura	Love Live! Nijigasaki Gakuen School Idol Dōkōkai Next Sky	
July 27	Azur Lane Queen's Orders	1	Yostar Pictures	Yu Yamashita	Azūrurēn kuīns Orders	
August 4	Sound! Euphonium: Ensemble Contest	1	Kyoto Animation	Tatsuya Ishihara	Tokubetsuhen Hibike! Euphonium: Ensemble Contest	
October 20	Mask Danshi: This Shouldn't Lead to Love	1	Studio Fusion	Naoko Takeichi	Mask Danshi wa Koishitakunai no ni	
October 25	The Idolmaster Cinderella Girls U149	1	CygamesPictures	Manabu Okamoto	Aidorumasutā Shinderera Gāruzu U149	
December 20	Hyakushō Kizoku	2	Pie in the sky	Yūtarō Sawada		

== Deaths ==
=== January ===
- January 13: Hitoshi Yoshioka, Japanese light novelist (Idol Defense Force Hummingbird, The Irresponsible Captain Tylor, Yōseiki Suikoden), dies at age 62.

=== February ===
- February 5: Takako Sasuga, Japanese voice actress (voice of Monomi in the Danganronpa franchise, Akubi in Hakushon Daimao, Hata-bō in Osomatsu-kun, Twink in Princess Knight, Tarao Fuguta in Sazae-san, Hajime in Tensai Bakabon), dies at age 87.
- February 13: Leiji Matsumoto, Japanese animator and manga artist (Galaxy Express 999, Interstella 5555: The 5tory of the 5ecret 5tar 5ystem, Space Battleship Yamato, Space Pirate Captain Harlock, Queen Millennia, Queen Emeraldas), dies from acute heart failure at age 85.
- February 15: Shōzō Iizuka, Japanese actor (voice of Nappa in Dragon Ball Z, Caramel Man in Dr. Slump, Dogen Awakusu in Durarara!!, Yoshio Marui in Mister Ajikko, Ryu Jose in Mobile Suit Gundam, Happosai Hieta in Nintama Rantaro), dies from acute heart failure at age 89.
- February 16: Maon Kurosaki, Japanese singer (performed theme songs for A Certain Magical Index, Danganronpa 3: The End of Hope's Peak High School Future Arc, Highschool of the Dead, Jormungand, Reincarnated as a Sword, Tokyo Ravens), dies from complications from chronic illness at age 35.
- February 23: Junnosuke Kuroda, Japanese musician and guitarist for the band Sumika (performed theme songs for A Couple of Cuckoos, Mix, My Hero Academia: Heroes Rising, I Want to Eat Your Pancreas, Wotakoi: Love Is Hard for Otaku), dies at age 34.
- February 25: Mitsuo Senda, Japanese voice actor (voice of Jeff in Giant Gorg, Elder Squirrel in Gon, Cai Ze in Kingdom, Great Toad Sage in Naruto Shippuden, Yoneo Yamada in Ojamanga Yamada-kun, Smiley in Sherlock Hound), dies from ischemic heart failure at age 82.

=== March ===
- March 2: Ryuho Okawa, Japanese religious leader (Happy Science) and anime producer (The Rebirth of Buddha, The Laws of the Universe), dies at age 66.
- March 5: Takahiro Kimura, Japanese animator (City Hunter, Idol Densetsu Eriko, Mobile Suit Victory Gundam) and character designer (Betterman, Code Geass, Code Geass Lelouch of the Re;surrection, The King of Braves GaoGaiGar, Mobile Suit Gundam Hathaway, Xenoblade Chronicles 2), dies from amyloidosis at age 58.
- March 28: Ryuichi Sakamoto, Japanese musician and composer (Exception, My Tyrano: Together, Forever, Royal Space Force: The Wings of Honnêamise), dies from throat cancer at age 71.

=== April ===
- April 1: Yasumichi Kushida, Japanese voice actor (voice of Ginga Hoshi in 30-sai no Hoken Taiiku, Nobusuma in Demon Prince Enma, Gorō Mikajima in Planetarian: The Reverie of a Little Planet and Planetarian: Storyteller of the Stars, Gousuke Guden in The Aquatope on White Sand), dies at age 46.
- April 26: Frank Agrama, American film director and producer, founder of Harmony Gold USA (Dragon Ball, Once Upon a Time, Robotech: The Shadow Chronicles, Space Pirate Captain Harlock), dies at age 93.

=== May ===
- May 22: Yasunori Arai, Japanese drummer for the band Baad (performed theme songs for Slam Dunk), dies.

=== June ===
- June 3: Manabu Ishikawa, Japanese animation producer (Evangelion: 1.0 You Are (Not) Alone, Evangelion: 2.0 You Can (Not) Advance, Psycho-Pass 2, Muromi-san) and scriptwriter (Fullmetal Alchemist, Mononoke, Transformers: Cybertron, Welcome to Irabu's Office, Yozakura Quartet), dies.

=== July ===
- July 1: Ippei Kuri, Japanese manga artist, animation director (Judo Boy, Speed Racer), character designer (Science Ninja Team Gatchaman: The Movie, Space Ace, Robotech II: The Sentinels), producer (Samurai Pizza Cats, Science Ninja Team Gatchaman, Tekkaman Blade II), and co-founder and CEO of Tatsunoko Production, dies at age 83.

=== August ===
- August 5: Nami Sano, Japanese manga artist (Haven't You Heard? I'm Sakamoto, Migi to Dali), dies from cancer at age 36.
- August 15: Shunpei Maruyama, Japanese animation producer, and former president of Actas (Girls und Panzer, Princess Principal). (death announced on this date)
- August 19: Nizo Yamamoto, Japanese art director (Attack on Tomorrow!, Castle in the Sky, Fantastic Children, Future Boy Conan, Grave of the Fireflies, Jarinko Chie, Little Nemo: Adventures in Slumberland, Princess Mononoke, Spirited Away, The Girl Who Leapt Through Time, Weathering with You) and animation director (Miyori no Mori), dies from stomach cancer at age 70.

=== September ===
- September 8: Buichi Terasawa, Japanese manga artist (Cobra, Goku Midnight Eye, Karasu Tengu Kabuto, Takeru - The Bad Boy of Yamato), dies from a heart attack at age 68.

=== October ===
- October 8: Shinji Tanimura, Japanese singer-songwriter (performed and wrote theme songs for Heaven's Lost Property, Turn A Gundam), dies at age 74.
- October 19: Atsushi Sakurai, Japanese lead vocalist for the band Buck-Tick (performed theme songs for GeGeGe no Kitarō (2018), Nightwalker: The Midnight Detective, xxxHolic, Trinity Blood), dies from a brainstem hemorrhage at age 57.
- October 20: Yousuke Naka, Japanese voice actor (voice of Nobita's dad in Doraemon (1979), Ehrenberg in Legend of the Galactic Heroes Die Neue These, Mulligan in Sohryuden: Legend of the Dragon Kings), dies at age 93.
- October 24: Miyuki Ichijo, Japanese voice actress (voice of Jodie Starling in Case Closed, Cardo Nabo in Mobile Suit Gundam: The Witch from Mercury – Prologue, Misa Takatsuki in Project ARMS, Yoshii in The House of the Lost on the Cape), dies from multiple organ failure at age 76.
- October 29: Heath, Japanese bassist for the band X Japan (performed theme songs for X), dies from colorectal cancer at age 55.

=== November ===
- November 2: Haruko Kitahama, Japanese voice actress (voice of Baron Ashura (Female) in Mazinger Z, Setsuko Ōhara in Obake no Q-Tarō, Ichimatsu and Todomatsu in Osomatsu-kun, Rafflesia in Space Pirate Captain Harlock, Mama in The Adventures of Hutch the Honeybee, Ruka in Triton of the Sea), dies from chronic lung disease at age 86.
- November 6: Yoshiko Miura, Japanese lyricist (wrote theme songs for Aura Battler Dunbine, Cat's Eye, Creamy Mami, the Magic Angel, God Mars, Panzer World Galient, Ronin Warriors, Urusei Yatsura 2: Beautiful Dreamer. Yawara!), dies from pneumonia at age 74.
- November 7: Ken'ichi Sakemi, Japanese novelist (Like the Clouds, Like the Wind), dies from respiratory failure at age 59.
- November 16: Hajime Kikuchi, Japanese music composer for the band Eufonius (composed music for True Tears and Konohana Kitan), dies from acute heart failure at age 44.
- November 19: Peter Spellos, American actor (voice of Von Jobina in Bastard!! (OVA), Whamon in Digimon Adventure, Grizzlymon in Digimon Frontier: Island of Lost Digimon, Gilliam in Outlaw Star, Hakim Ashmead in Planetes, Sagat in Street Fighter II: The Animated Movie), dies from complications from pancreatic cancer at age 69.
- November 26: Yusuke Chiba, Japanese singer-songwriter for the band The Birthday (performed theme songs for The First Slam Dunk, Zombie-Loan, Naruto Shippuden the Movie: The Will of Fire), dies from esophegal cancer at age 55.

=== December ===
- December 30:
  - Satoshi Iwataki, Japanese animator and character designer for Ghost Hunt and Dororo, dies from an illness at age 60.
  - Aki Yashiro, Japanese enka singer (performed theme songs for The Gokusen, and Tottemo! Luckyman), dies from anti-MDA5 dermatomyositis and interstitial lung disease at age 73.
