= Minami Hinata =

Japanese voice actress

- 日向 未南
- Born: January 24; Fukushima, Japan
- Occupation: voice actress
- Years active: 2020–present
- Agent: Axl One
- Notable work: Ranking of Kings as Bojji
- Height: 160 cm (5 ft 3 in)

Minami Hinata (日向 未南, Hinata Minami; born January 24) is a Japanese voice actress from Fukushima, Japan. She is affiliated with Axl One. In 2023, she was a recipient of the Best New Actor Award at the 17th Seiyu Awards.

== Filmography ==
=== Anime ===
Year	Title	Role
2021	Super Cub	Student
2021	I've Been Killing Slimes for 300 Years and Maxed Out My Level	Blue Dragon C
2021	Mazica Party	Smel
2021	Megaton-kyū Musashi	Saki Kusakabe, Yoshiko Chino, Cat Show Regular
2021	Ranking of Kings	Bojji
2022	She Professed Herself Pupil of the Wise Man	Luminaria
2022	Kotaro Lives Alone	Tonosaman's Son
2023	Pole Princess!!	Subaru Nanyo
2023	Hell's Paradise: Jigokuraku	young Aza Chōbei
2024	Rinkai!	Ai Kumamoto
2025	Dr. Stone: Science Future	Charlotte Bony
2025	Dealing with Mikadono Sisters Is a Breeze	Yū Ayase
2025	Fire Force	young Leonard Burns^{Ep. 54 credits}
2026	Jujutsu Kaisen	young Naoya Zen'in

=== Animated films ===
Year	Title	Role
2025	Make a Girl	Akira Mizutamari (young)

=== Video games ===
Year	Title	Role
2023	Towa Tsugai	Tsubame
