= Rio Tsuchiya =

Japanese voice actress

- 土屋 李央
- Born: 19 August 1997 (age 29); Kanagawa Prefecture, Japan
- Occupations: Voice actress; singer
- Years active: 2019–present
- Employer: Office Osawa
- Notable work: Mei Tōmi in Cue! Madoka Higuchi in The Idolmaster Shiny Colors; Tanya in My One-Hit Kill Sister; Hinano Hoshikita in Pole Princess!! Juria Igarashi in Himitsu no AiPri; Madoka Yuzuhara in The Fragrant Flower Blooms with Dignity

Rio Tsuchiya (土屋 李央, Tsuchiya Rio; born 19 August 1997) is a Japanese voice actress and singer from Kanagawa Prefecture. She is affiliated with Office Osawa. She is known for voicing Mei Tōmi in Cue!, Madoka Higuchi in The Idolmaster Shiny Colors, Tanya in My One-Hit Kill Sister, Hinano Hoshikita in Pole Princess!!, Madoka Yuzuhara in The Fragrant Flower Blooms with Dignity and Juria Igarashi in Himitsu no AiPri.

== Biography ==
Rio Tsuchiya, a native of Kanagawa Prefecture, was born on 19 August 1997. In 2016, she starred in the public audition for the voice acting stage performance Genji Monogatari: Yōkō no Hime, Yūyami no Kimi.

In December 2020, she was cast as Ranka in SSSS.Dynazenon. In April 2022, she was cast as Shakuyaku in In the Heart of Kunoichi Tsubaki. In October 2022, she was cast as Tanya in My One-Hit Kill Sister. In November 2022, she was cast as Hinano Hoshikita in Tatsunoko Production's Pole Princess!! anime project. In March 2023, she was cast as Yukari Tsubaki in My Love Story with Yamada-kun at Lv999. In August 2023, she was cast as Hezera and Grea in Ragna Crimson.

In October 2019, she was cast as Mei Tōmi in the video game Cue!. She performed in two singles for her in-franchise musical unit AiRBLUE Moon, "MiRAGE! MiRAGE!!" (which charted at #23 in the Oricon Singles Chart) and "Reach For The World!" (which charted at #24 in the Oricon Singles Chart). She reprised her role as Mei Tōmi in the game's 2022 anime adaptation.

She voices Madoka Higuchi, one of the four members of the unit Noctchill, in The Idolmaster Shiny Colors, a spinoff of The Idolmaster franchise. Tsuchiya was solely interested in starring in the franchise in general and had also auditioned for Koito and Hinana. She performed in two Noctchill singles: Gradate Wing 07 (which charted at #4 in the Oricon Singles Chart) and Layered Wing 07 (which charted at #6 in the Oricon Singles Chart).

== Filmography ==
=== Anime television ===
2021

- SSSS.Dynazenon, Ranka

2022

- Cue!, Mei Tōmi
- In the Heart of Kunoichi Tsubaki, Shakuyaku

2023

- My One-Hit Kill Sister, Tanya
- My Love Story with Yamada-kun at Lv999, Yukari Tsubaki
- Ragna Crimson, Hazella and Greya

2024

- My Deer Friend Nokotan, Kinu Tanukikōji
- Negative Positive Angler, Kozue Nishimori
- The Dangers in My Heart, Nico Kouda
- The Idolmaster Shiny Colors 2nd Season, Madoka Higuchi

2025

- Himitsu no AiPri: Ring-hen, Julia Igarashi

2026

- Rich Girl Caretaker, Narika Miyakojima

=== Original net animation ===
2023

- Pole Princess!!, Hinano Hoshikita
- Gundam Build Metaverse, Seria Urutsuki

=== Video games ===
2019

- Cue!, Mei Tōmi

2020

- The Idolmaster Shiny Colors, Madoka Higuchi

2021

- Blue Archive, Misaki Imashino

2025

- Zenless Zone Zero, Lucia Elowen

2026

- Rain98, Reina Amehara

=== Live-action film ===
2025

- My Love Story with Yamada-kun at Lv999, Tsubaki (voice)
