= Ane Log =

Japanese manga series

- First tankōbon volume cover, featuring Moyako Konoe

姉ログ 靄子姉さんの止まらないモノローグ (Ane Rogu Moyako Nēsan no Tomaranai Monorōgu)
- Genre: Comedy
- Manga
- Written by: Kenji Taguchi
- Published by: Shogakukan
- Imprint: Shōnen Sunday Comics
- Magazine: Weekly Shōnen Sunday
- Original run: September 19, 2012 – April 20, 2016
- Volumes: 12
- Original video animation
- Directed by: Tetsuo Ichimura
- Written by: Natsuko Takahashi
- Studio: Brain's Base
- Licensed by: Sentai Filmworks
- Released: September 18, 2014 – April 18, 2015
- Runtime: 23 minutes
- Episodes: 3
- icon

Ane Log: Moyako Nēsan no Tomaranai Monologue (Japanese: 姉ログ 靄子姉さんの止まらないモノローグ, Hepburn: Ane Rogu Moyako Nēsan no Tomaranai Monorōgu; lit. 'Sister's Log: Moyako's Never-ending Monologue') is a Japanese manga series written and illustrated by Kenji Taguchi. It was serialized in Shogakukan's shōnen manga magazine Weekly Shōnen Sunday from September 2012 to April 2016, with its chapters collected in 12 tankōbon volumes. A three-episode original video animation (OVA) produced by Brain's Base was released from September 2014 to April 2015.

== Plot ==
Moyako Konoe, a high school girl, becomes convinced that her younger brother Akira is secretly a pervert with a sister complex after he innocently said as a child that he wanted to marry her. Taking this statement seriously even years later, Moyako believes it is her responsibility as an older sister to "rehabilitate" him and prevent him from becoming a deviant.

However, most of Akira's behavior is completely normal, and the situations Moyako interprets as perverted are usually misunderstandings created by her own imagination. Everyday interactions between the siblings are repeatedly misinterpreted by Moyako, leading her to take extreme or absurd actions to avoid what she believes are Akira's schemes.

== Characters ==
Moyako Konoe (近衛 靄子, Konoe Moyako)
Voiced by: Ami Koshimizu
Akira Konoe (近衛 輝, Konoe Akira)
Voiced by: Takahiro Mizushima
Kasumi Kurose (黒瀬 香澄, Kurose Kasumi)
Voiced by: Satomi Akesaka
Fūka Saeki (冴木 風花, Saeki Fūka)
Voiced by: Mariko Honda
Brisa Umehira (梅比良 ブリサ, Umehira Burisa)
Voiced by: Aoi Yūki
Yōhei Fukuyama (福山 陽平, Fukuyama Yōhei)
Voiced by: Subaru Kimura

== Media ==
=== Manga ===
Written and illustrated by Kenji Taguchi, Ane Log was serialized in Shogakukan's shōnen manga magazine Weekly Shōnen Sunday from September 19, 2012, to April 20, 2016. Shogakukan collected its chapters in 12 tankōbon volumes, released from May 17, 2013, to June 17, 2016.

==== Volumes ====
No.	Release date	ISBN
1	May 17, 2013	978-4-09-124308-9
2	September 18, 2013	978-4-09-124385-0; 978-4-09-159162-3 (SE)
3	December 18, 2013	978-4-09-124513-7
4	April 18, 2014	978-4-09-124623-3
5	September 18, 2014; September 16, 2014 (SE)	978-4-09-125105-3; 978-4-09-941836-6 (SE)
6	December 18, 2014; December 16, 2014 (SE)	978-4-09-125398-9; 978-4-09-941851-9 (SE)
7	April 17, 2015; April 15, 2015 (SE)	978-4-09-125833-5; 978-4-09-941853-3 (SE)
8	July 17, 2015	978-4-09-126194-6
9	October 16, 2015	978-4-09-126470-1
10	March 18, 2016	978-4-09-126826-6
11	May 18, 2016	978-4-09-127166-2
12	June 17, 2016	978-4-09-127237-9

=== Drama CD ===
A drama CD was bundled with the limited edition of the second manga volume on September 18, 2013.

=== Anime ===
A fan disc, which included a six-episode flash anime and three short special episodes, was released on April 18, 2014. An original video animation (OVA), produced by Brain's Base and directed by Tetsuo Ichimura, with scripts by Natsuko Takahashi and character designs by Eriko Itō, was bundled with the limited edition of the fifth manga volume on September 16, 2014. A second episode was bundled with the limited edition of the sixth manga volume on December 16, 2014. A third episode was bundled with the limited edition of the seventh manga volume on April 15, 2015.

In June 2021, Sentai Filmworks announced that they licensed the OVAs for digital and home video releases. It was released on January 11, 2022.

== See also ==
- My One-Hit Kill Sister, another manga series illustrated by Kenji Taguchi
