= My Love Story with Yamada-kun at Lv999 =

Japanese manga series

- Cover of the first volume

山田くんとLv999の恋をする (Yamada-kun to Reberu Kyū-hyaku Kyū-jū Kyū no Koi o Suru)
- Genre: Romantic comedy
- Manga
- Written by: Mashiro
- Published by: Comic Smart (digital); Media Factory (print)
- English publisher: NA: Mangamo / Inklore
- Imprint: MF Comics
- Magazine: Ganma!
- Original run: March 7, 2019 – present
- Volumes: 10
- Anime television series
- Directed by: Morio Asaka
- Written by: Yasuhiro Nakanishi
- Music by: Mito; De De Mouse
- Studio: Madhouse
- Licensed by: NA: Aniplex of America
- Original network: Tokyo MX, BS11
- English network: SEA: Animax Asia
- Original run: April 2, 2023 – June 25, 2023
- Episodes: 13
- Live-action film
- Directed by: Yuka Yasukawa
- Produced by: Tomoka Takagi
- Written by: Anna Kawahara
- Studio: Kadokawa Daiei Studio
- Released: March 28, 2025
- Runtime: 118 minutes
- icon

My Love Story with Yamada-kun at Lv999 (Japanese: 山田くんとLv999の恋をする, Hepburn: Yamada-kun to Reberu Kyū-hyaku Kyū-jū Kyū no Koi o Suru), also known as Loving Yamada at Lv999!, is a Japanese manga series written and illustrated by Mashiro. It began serialization on Comic Smart's Ganma! manga website in March 2019. As of November 2024, the series' individual chapters have been collected into ten volumes. An anime television series adaptation produced by Madhouse aired from April to June 2023. A live-action film adaptation premiered in March 2025.

== Plot ==
The story follows the daily life of college student Akane Kinoshita. After getting dumped by her boyfriend, she continues the MMORPG Forest of Savior (FoS) they once played together and attended an offline event of the game. There she encounters an emotionless and handsome high school student named Akito Yamada. Yamada happens to belong to the same guild in the game as Akane, and after this encounter Akane begins to get closer to other members of the guild, especially Yamada.

== Characters ==
=== The Member of "Chocolate Rabbit" Guilds ===
Akane Kinoshita (木之下 茜, Kinoshita Akane)
Voiced by: Inori Minase (Japanese); Abby Trott (English)
Portrayed by: Mizuki Yamashita
Akane is a college student and a casual player of FoS, which she started playing for her ex-boyfriend (who ironically cheated on her with fellow game player). She is mature, although sometimes a bit naive. She has a habit of keeping things and letting them pile up, as she treasures the presents she receives so much. In FoS, she uses her real name as a nickname. She belongs to a guild called "Chocolate Rabbit."
Akito Yamada (山田 秋斗, Yamada Akito)
Voiced by: Koki Uchiyama (Japanese); Stephen Fu (English)
Portrayed by: Ryūto Sakuma
A member of Akane's guild under name "Yamada", his avatar is an emotionless afro male character. Akito is a 3rd year high school student who hardly expresses his emotions and thoughts. He is locally popular as a pro-gamer, a player who gets sponsored to play a game. FoS is his "casual game", while mainly playing FPS games.
Eita Sasaki (佐々木 瑛太, Sasaki Eita)
Voiced by: Natsuki Hanae, Ai Kakuma (Rurihime) (Japanese); Landon McDonald, Lily Ki (Rurihime) (English)
A 19 year old college student who runs the guild "Chocolate Rabbit" under a girl avatar named "Rurihime." Akito's childhood friend, he created the guild so his little sister could play in ease.
Runa Sasaki (佐々木 瑠奈, Sasaki Runa)
Voiced by: Ai Kakuma (Japanese); Michelle Marie (English)
Eita's younger sister who is the model of Rurihime's appearance. She hates new people and thinks Chocolate Rabbit as her second home and initially wanted to kick Akane after their first meeting, though she becomes attached to her instead, even supporting her and Akito. She has several characters in FoS, one of them being a good-looking male avatar.
Takezo Kamota (鴨田 たけぞう, Kamota Takezō)
Voiced by: Nobuo Tobita (Japanese); Brook Chalmers (English)
The deputy guildmaster of Chocolate Rabbit going by the name of "Takezo." His avatar is a small, cotton-like creature which grows to monster-size during battle. In real life, he is a middle-aged man who owns a strawberry farm and inexplicably has a lot of connections.
Yukari Tsubaki (椿 ゆかり, Tsubaki Yukari)
Voiced by: Rio Tsuchiya (Japanese); Lizzie Freeman (English)
Akito's classmate who gets closer to him after they both matched in an FPS game battle. She fears falling in love with him because she knows she will be rejected like the other girls. She later inevitably falls for him and gets rejected. She starts playing FoS for Akito, joining Akane's guild under the name "Tsubaki", represented by a female elf avatar.

=== Other characters ===
Momoko Maeda (前田 桃子, Maeda Momoko)
Voiced by: Saori Ōnishi (Japanese); Lauren Landa (English)
Akane's best friend Momo, who likes going to gokon. She's sharp, sometimes sarcastic, and is totally opposite to Akane personality wise. Nevertheless, she always stand beside Akane, and would listen to her troubles. It seems that the reason she can't get a boyfriend is because her standard is too high.
Takuma Furukawa (古川 たくま, Furukawa Takuma)
Voiced by: Yoshiki Nakajima (Japanese); Howard Wang (English)
Akane's ex-boyfriend, who also happens to be a huge fan of Akito. Takuma was the one who introduced Akane to FoS, before cheating on her with fellow game player.

== Media ==
=== Manga ===
Written and illustrated by Mashiro, the series began serialization on Comic Smart's Ganma! manga website on March 7, 2019. Media Factory is publishing the series in print under their MF Comics imprint. As of November 2024, ten tankōbon volumes have been released.

Mangamo is publishing the series in English digitally simultaneously with its Japanese release, initially under the title Loving Yamada at Lv999!, before changing it to match the anime's title. In June 2023, Mangamo announced that they would release the series in print in collaboration with Penguin Random House's Inklore imprint. The first volume was released on April 2, 2024.

==== Volumes ====
No.	Original release date	Original ISBN	English release date	English ISBN
1	February 21, 2020	978-4-04-064520-9	April 2, 2024	978-1-98-486269-3
Chapters 1–9
2	September 23, 2020	978-4-04-064954-2	September 3, 2024	978-1-98-486270-9
Chapters 10–19
3	March 23, 2021	978-4-04-680295-8	October 1, 2024	978-1-98-486271-6
Chapters 20–30
4	September 21, 2021	978-4-04-680776-2	December 3, 2024	978-1-91-172003-4
Chapters 31–40
5	April 22, 2022	978-4-04-681368-8	March 18, 2025	978-1-91-172004-1
Chapters 41–50
6	October 21, 2022	978-4-04-681914-7	March 24, 2026	979-8-21-709187-4
Chapters 51–62
7	April 21, 2023	978-4-04-682409-7	August 18, 2026	979-8-21-709189-8
Chapters 63–74
8	October 23, 2023	978-4-04-683001-2	—	—
Chapters 75–85
9	April 23, 2024	978-4-04-683595-6	—	—
Chapters 86–96
10	November 22, 2024	978-4-04-684125-4	—	—
Chapters 97–107

=== Anime ===
An anime television series adaptation was announced during the Aniplex Online Fest 2022 event on September 24, 2022. It is produced by Madhouse and directed by Morio Asaka, with scripts written by Yasuhiro Nakanishi, character designs by Kunihiko Hamada, and music composed by Mito and De De Mouse. The series aired from April 2 to June 25, 2023, on Tokyo MX and other networks. The opening theme song is "Gradation" (ぐらでーしょん) by Kana-Boon featuring Yūho Kitazawa, while the ending theme song is "Trick Art" (トリック・アート) by Ryujin Kiyoshi. Aniplex of America licensed the series and streamed it on Crunchyroll.

==== Episodes ====
No.	Title	Directed by	Storyboarded by	Original release date
1	"This Is Why I Can't Stand Gamer Guys!"; Transliteration: "Kore da Kara! Gēmu Suru Otoko Nante!!" (Japanese: これだからっ！ゲームする男なんて！！)	Aya Kobayashi	Morio Asaka	April 2, 2023
Akane is dumped by her boyfriend Takuma for a girl named Eri he met in the online game they both play, Forest of Savior (FOS). Logging on to FOS, Akane ends up lashing out at Yamada, an online guildmate known to be cold and antisocial. She sees an invitation to a real-world event for FOS players. Suspecting Takuma and Eri will attend, Akane has a makeover to ensure Takuma regrets dumping her, but at the event she trips trying to get Takuma to notice her. She is helped up by a handsome guy she identifies as Yamada from his cold personality. Takuma is a huge Yamada fan so Akane bribes him with a super rare game item to pretend to be her new boyfriend. Takuma is jealous but is cheered up by Eri, leaving Akane unsatisfied and miserable. Akane and the reluctant Yamada talk over drinks, and she learns he is a famous pro-gamer who gets sponsorships to play games in official competitions. He is also uninterested in dating. After Yamada leaves to go buy band-aids for her scratched ankle, Akane misinterprets his departure as him leaving her alone. She cries and gets drunk to dull the pain for rejection. The next morning, Akane wakes up hungover in Yamada's apartment with Yamada gaming nearby.
2	"It's Almost Time for the Boss to Spawn, So..."; Transliteration: "Sorosoro Bosu Waki no Jikan Nande" (Japanese: そろそろボス湧きの時間なんで)	Hideki Tonokatsu	Morio Asaka	April 9, 2023
Akane fears she and Yamada had sex, but all he did was let her sleep. He asks her to leave and not to see her again. Akane realizes her necklace, the first gift she received from Takuma, is missing. Tracking down Yamada in FOS he insists it is not at his apartment and then criticizes her overusing the limited space in the guilds' storage box. Akane logs off upset. Yamada finds the necklace by accidentally stepping on and breaking it. Akane realizes she needs to move on from Takuma. She spots Yamada in public harshly rejecting a classmate's confession and is compelled to scold him, while realizing Yamada must be a high school senior. Yamada returns the broken necklace which deeply upsets her, give her his umbrella in the rain. The next day Akane's mother abruptly sends all her belongings from her childhood bedroom, filling her small apartment with boxes. She realizes this is why Yamada was upset about the guild storage box and she throws away everything she does not need. Getting drunk again she visits Yamada to thank him for everything. Yamada actually hints it might be nice to see her in FOS again.
3	"I Wanna Have an Offline Meeting"; Transliteration: "Ofu-kai Shitai nā" (Japanese: オフ会したいなぁ♡)	Chihiro Kumano	Miwa Sasaki	April 16, 2023
After attending a disastrous singles mixer, Akane logs on FOS and accidentally eavesdrops on Yamada and guild leader Rurihime, leading her to suspect they are dating. This depresses her more than the mixer. At college she meets a guy from the mixer whose name she cannot remember, and ignores him when she spots Yamada talking to a girl she suspects is Rurihime, making her feel even worse. She decides to avoid FOS for a while, but Rurihime abruptly invites her to a café mixer for the whole guild, including Yamada. Akane struggles to follow the directions to the café until a handsome guy offers to direct her there as he is a guild member. Akane greets the girl with Yamada as Rurihime but is embarrassed when she isn't Rurihime at all. A flashback to the night Akane slept drunk at Yamada's apartment shows she did not pass out straight away, she began crying over Takuma so Yamada held her until she fell asleep and briefly woke up to throw up.
4	"Are You In Love with Yamada?"; Transliteration: "Yamada-san no Koto Suki Nan Desu ka?" (Japanese: 山田さんのこと好きなんですか？)	Kotono Watanabe	Kenji Setō	April 23, 2023
It transpires the handsome guy is Rurihime, real name Eita, an old school friend of Yamada. An old man named Takezo also joins them whom Akane has never met in FOS as he specializes in raiding dungeons. The girl is Eita's sister Runa, who plays FOS so rarely almost no one else knows she is a guild member. Akane is relieved Yamada is in fact single and did not lie to her. Runa hates Akane's causal relationship with Yamada and demands to know if she loves him, causing Eita to scold her rudeness. Akane is shocked by Runa's question, and becomes flustered. Meanwhile, Yamada worries Akane is upset with him, exasperating Eita that Yamada does not understand girls at all. Yamada thinks back to a childhood friend he had. After the mixer ends Runa jealously decides to get Akane expelled from the guild. Sharing a train home Akane struggles to maintain conversation with Yamada but settles on food. Discovering his terrible diet, Akane impulsively gives him days' worth of homecooked meals from her freezer, confusing him. Runa calls Akane to apologies and invites her to spend Saturday together as friends. Yamada knows Runa already has plans for Saturday and is suspicious.
5	"How About You Give Us an Explanation"; Transliteration: "Kuwashiku Kikasete Moraou ka" (Japanese: 詳しく聞かせてもらおうか)	Kōki Uchinomiya	Koji Sawai	April 30, 2023
Yamada is revealed to tutor Runa on Saturdays, but is unsure if he should tell Akane. Akane finds Runa set her up on a blind date with a middle aged man who thinks Akane is Rurihime, so she goes to the bathroom to call Runa. Yamada sees Runa avoid answering the phone, confirming she is pranking Akane. Akane is terrified when the man follows her to the bathroom. Yamada tells Eita who realizes Runa set Akane up with a random Rurihime superfan, and scolds Runa for putting Akane in danger with a potential internet stalker. Everyone rushes to rescue Akane who now has an injured leg. Eita is furious but it turns out the man was genuinely checking to see if Akane was sick in the bathroom, and she hurt her own leg falling over from being surprised. Yamada apologizes for not revealing the prank before. Realizing she really put Akane at risk Runa apologizes. Eita intends to scold Runa severely but Akane sends everyone away to speak to Runa alone. Runa admits what she did and they manage to reconcile. Yamada is impressed with Akane. Still believing she is Rurihime, the superfan proposes marriage and is decisively rejected.
6	"I Personally Would Prefer a Love Comedy Ending"; Transliteration: "Kojinteki ni wa Rabukome Tenkai Kibō" (Japanese: 個人的にはラブコメ展開希望)	Aya Kobayashi	Miwa Sasaki	May 7, 2023
Flashbacks show that Runa was coddled by her parents and Eita, making her selfish, childish and unable to make friends outside the internet. Then she met Akane whom she considers a friend but is also aware Akane is older and has other friends besides her, so their friendship is not one of equals. Despite this, she has warmed up greatly to Akane. While also hanging out with Akane's other friend Momo, Runa becomes bad tempered about sharing Akane. Akane believes she and Yamada have grown closer after he apologizes for an insensitive statement and uses an emoji. Akane's computer short circuits leaving her unable to play FOS, so Eita and Runa have Yamada visit Akane to repair it. Yamada abruptly thanks Akane for the frozen meals she gave him, making her happy. Runa begins to suspect Eita was right; Akane might be the perfect match for Yamada. At Eita's suggestion Runa plots a "love comedy ending" by pushing Akane onto Yamada for a "lucky pervert scene", but this only injures Yamada's eye. Runa's plot is somewhat successful when Akane tries to see Yamada's eye, putting their faces close together. Yamada is so surprised by her proximity he quickly leaves, claiming he forgot his computer repair tools.
7	"You Want To Feel at Ease?"; Transliteration: "Anshin Shitai Desu ka?" (Japanese: 安心したいですか？)	Hideki Tonokatsu; Kazumasa Isogawa	Koji Sawai	May 14, 2023
Yamada buys a drink but accidentally upsets the employee, a recent graduate from his school, by rebuffing her when she asks his name. Returning, he finds Akane and Runa asleep, and Akane has now tied her hair back. Feeling guilty he unties her hair without waking her. Yamada answers Akane's door and finds her ex Takuma who is amazed by Yamada's presence in Akane's home but is certain Yamada would not be dating her, annoying Yamada on Akane's behalf. Takuma wonders if she is okay but decides her seeing him would upset her, so he leaves. Akane overhears everything but is okay with it. She realizes her hair is down and Yamada admits he did it but cannot explain why, confusing her. Akane gets a job at a convenience store near college. With her laptop repaired Akane resumes FOS and meets Takezo online for the first time, finding his avatar is a one inch tall Micronest ideal for his dungeon raiding. As payment for the laptop repair Eita asks Akane for her assistance clearing a dungeon. At school Yamada is asked to participate in the festival pageant but declines just as Eita informs him he, Runa, Takezo and Akane will attend the festival as FOS representatives.
8	"If That Happened, That Would Be..."; Transliteration: "Moshi Sō nara Sore wa Sugoku" (Japanese: もしそうならそれはすごく)	Chihiro Kumano	Koji Sawai	May 21, 2023
At the festival Akane notices Runa is unwell from stress as she will soon take the entrance exam to attend the school. While she recovers, Akane sees Yamada busy with his class and decides not to interrupt him. Yamada sees her anyway and talks to her straight away, making her smile. A nurse diagnoses Runa as just hungry so Akane and Yamada visit the food stalls for her, though being with Yamada draws jealous questions from the girls they pass, delaying them. Eita jokes since the rumors have started they might as well start dating, embarrassing Akane who runs away. Eita starts to follow her but Yamada beats him to it and stops her by using her first name for the first time. He apologizes for the bad joke. Akane asks him what he would've done if she would agreed to date him, but plays it off as the same joke about them dating. She is shocked when Yamada responds that he has not thought about it because he sees her as too good for someone like him. Still declining to be in the pageant, Yamada's classmate Okamoto takes his place, angering the female audience and garnering support from the male audience.
9	"The Guild Is Facing a Crisis!!"; Transliteration: "Girudo no Ichidaiji da yo!!" (Japanese: ギルドの一大事だよっ！！)	Asami Kawano	Miwa Sasaki	May 28, 2023
Yamada sees Akane at her convenience store job, who asks him to wait for her as she has cooked him healthy meals again. Her co-workers are surprised they are not dating. Yamada saves her from being hit by a bicycle, deeply affecting her emotionally as she is unsure if it is acceptable to fall in love with him. Runa is not happy a new female player is joining the guild in case she is friendly and steals Akane from her. Akane is surprised it is a classmate of Yamada's whom he invited to join. The classmate, Tsubaki, appears to have a crush on Yamada and dislikes the thought of him with other girls, seemingly irritated when he talks to Akane on the phone. She asks Yamada if he likes Akane, who, despite thinking of Akane fondly in his memories, is unable to give a response. While Runa is being tutored by Yamada, Akane calls to tell her she cannot play FOS that night. Through a combination of working overtime, having no food, and the doctors' clinic being closed for the weekend, Akane's cold has worsened and she becomes seriously ill. She attempts to go shopping but falls outside her apartment. Yamada arrives and rescues her. In her confused state she decides she must be dreaming about Yamada, who picks her up to take her to her apartment.
10	"I'll Definitely Be Hurt Someday"; Transliteration: "Kitto Itsuka Kizutsuku" (Japanese: きっといつか傷つく)	Mitsutaka Noshitani; Cheng Xiang Tai	Koji Sawai	June 4, 2023
Tsubaki is upset by Yamada's absence and recalls falling in love with him after he beat her in another online game. She now fears she waited too long and has lost him. Tsubaki also remembers Yamada told her how a long time ago a classmate was bullied for having a crush on him, causing her to transfer schools. Yamada began avoiding girls entirely, leading Tsubaki to delay confessing to him until now. Akane worsens so Yamada takes her to hospital and takes her home again when she is discharged. By the time she awakens she remembers nothing and is alarmed Yamada is asleep in her apartment. She cries after realizing how much he helped her despite the trouble it caused him. Her belief in him causes Yamada to remember the girl from before and how badly he failed her, though Akane talking about how her own breakup helps him feel better, understanding the situation more. Her dehydration causes a leg cramp which Yamada helps with, causing her to realize that despite being on her bed she feels safe with him; her expression making him laugh. Morning arrives so Yamada leaves, even though Akane wants him to stay and is sad when he is gone.
11	"There's Something I Want to Talk to You About"; Transliteration: "Hanashitai Koto ga Aru no" (Japanese: 話したいことがあるの)	Aya Kobayashi	Aya Kobayashi	June 11, 2023
Momo visits Akane as she recovers and, hearing what Yamada did, is privately convinced he is in love with Akane. Akane plays FOS and finally meets Tsubaki so they go monster hunting with Eita. Eita deliberately holds back, letting Akane and Tsubaki work together on an unbeatable boss monster and develop a tentative friendship. Akane calls Yamada on the phone for hints on the boss monster and develops a strategy. Tsubaki admits to Eita she joined FOS for a selfish reason but does not elaborate. Eita tells her to just go for it or nothing will ever change for her. Akane tells Yamada she enjoyed hearing his voice and abruptly hangs up from embarrassment. She arranges coffee with Momo to ask her real opinion on why Takuma dumped her so she can start to recover from their breakup and move on to Yamada. They are abruptly joined by two guys from Momo's last group date who she found insensitive and annoying. Luckily they are saved by Eita, who is a waiter at the café, and forcefully moves the guys to another table. Momo is slightly jealous Akane knows yet another attractive guy. Akane decides to ask Eita something important as well.
12	"I Like You"; Transliteration: "Suki da yo" (Japanese: 好きだよ)	Kotono Watanabe; Kazumasa Isogawa	Naomi Nakayama; Hyūga Yamamura	June 18, 2023
Akane is embarrassed so Momo blurts it out for her; Akane is in love and wants to know why she was previously dumped. Eita assures her Yamada is much kinder than Takuma, and with Yamada's personality it would be better if she is blunt with him. Akane decides to confess immediately. As soon as Akane leaves Momo makes a move on Eita. Arriving at Yamada's home she attempts to confess but Yamada needs to leave for cram school. She accompanies him but does not want to confess in public. Yamada promises to phone after his class. It begins raining and Yamada ends up sharing his umbrella with Tsubaki. As they are about to go their separate ways Tsubaki blurts out her own love confession to him. Akane is saddened when Yamada texts her he will have to phone another day. Later Eita asks Yamada about Akane's confession. Yamada, thinking he means Tsubaki, replies he is unsure, so Eita tells him to answer quickly. He visits Akane, who notices he seems upset, so she delays confessing to cheer him up talking about FOS. Yamada later goes out to speak with Tsubaki.
13	"In the Morning When I Wake Up"; Transliteration: "Asa Okitara" (Japanese: 朝 起きたら)	Asami Kawano	Asami Kawano; Morio Asaka	June 25, 2023
After some initial awkwardness Tsubaki goes on a directionless rant of everything she likes about Yamada, making him increasingly uncomfortable. Having finally said it, Tsubaki feels enormous relief but is not surprised when he rejects her, finally admitting for the first time that he likes Akane. Tsubaki returns home, managing to suppress her tears until Yamada has left. Akane goes to dinner with Eita, Runa, and Takezo, who apparently is secretly a company president in real life. Yamada arrives late and is put in charge of Akane, cheerfully drunk after not realising how strong the alcohol was. He decides to skip eating and take her safely home, holding her hand the whole journey. At her apartment she drunkenly asks if he likes her. He admits he does then promises to return to admit it the next day too, in case she has hangover amnesia. She asks if she can phone in the morning to hear him say it and they end up hugging goodnight. The next day Akane struggles with the notion she has a boyfriend younger than herself and worries about being a distraction or a burden. As they walk holding hands Yamada cannot help remembering their chaotic first encounter months ago.

=== Live-action film ===
A live-action film adaptation was announced on November 7, 2024. It was produced by Kadokawa Daiei Studio and directed by Yuka Yasukawa, based on a screenplay by Anna Kawahara. Tomoka Takagi served as the producer and Kadokawa distributed the film. The film premiered on March 28, 2025.

== Reception ==
In the 2020 Next Manga Award, the series ranked ninth in the web manga category. In the same month, the series was nominated for pixiv and Nippon Shuppan Hanbai, Inc's Web Manga General Election. In the 2021 Next Manga Award, the series ranked fourth in the web manga category. At AnimeJapan 2021, the series ranked ninth in a poll asking people what manga they most wanted to see adapted into an anime. In the 2021 Tsutaya Comic Award, the series ranked sixth. In the 2022 Tsutaya Comic Award, the series won the grand prize. In the 2022 Anan Manga Award, the series won the grand prize.

By April 2022, the series has one million copies in circulation between its digital and print releases. By October 2022, the series had two million copies in circulation.
