= Pole Princess!! =

Japanese ONA series

- Key visual

ポールプリンセス‼ (Pōru Purinsesu!!)
- Created by: Avex Pictures; Tatsunoko Production
- Original net animation

Episode 00
- Directed by: Hitomi Ezoe; Yoshihiro Otobe (CG)
- Written by: Touko Machida
- Music by: Kenta Higashiohji
- Studio: Tatsunoko Production
- Released: December 23, 2022
- Runtime: 6 minutes
- Original net animation
- Directed by: Hitomi Ezoe; Yoshihiro Otobe (CG)
- Written by: Touko Machida
- Music by: Kenta Higashiohji
- Studio: Tatsunoko Production
- Released: January 13, 2023 – April 3, 2023
- Runtime: 5–7 minutes
- Episodes: 7
- Anime film
- Directed by: Hitomi Ezoe; Yoshihiro Otobe (CG)
- Written by: Touko Machida
- Music by: Kenta Higashiohji
- Studio: Tatsunoko Production
- Released: November 23, 2023
- Runtime: 75 minutes
- Anime film

Pole Princess!!: Croix du Nord
- Directed by: Hitomi Ezoe; Yoshihiro Otobe (CG)
- Written by: Touko Machida
- Music by: Kenta Higashiohji
- Studio: Tatsunoko Production
- Released: January 29, 2027
- Runtime: 60 minutes

Pole Princess!! (ポールプリンセス‼, Pōru Purinsesu!!) is a Japanese ONA series about pole dancing animated by Tatsunoko Production and produced by Avex Pictures. A prologue was posted on YouTube on December 23, 2022, with the series being uploaded there from January 13 to April 3, 2023. An anime film premiered on November 23, 2023. A second anime film, titled Pole Princess!!: Croix du Nord, is set to premiere on January 29, 2027.

== Characters ==
=== Galaxy Princess ===
Hinano Hoshikita (星北ヒナノ, Hoshikita Hinano)
Voiced by: Rio Tsuchiya
Lilia Saijo (西条リリア, Saijo Lilia)
Voiced by: Anna Suzuki
Mio Tousaka (東坂ミオ, Tousaka Mio)
Voiced by: Yui Ogura
Subaru Nanyo (南曜スバル, Nanyo Subaru)
Voiced by: Minami Hinata
Azumi Shinо̄ (芯央アズミ, Shinō Azumi)
Voiced by: Rie Kugimiya

=== Aile D'ange ===
Yukari Mikoshiro (御子白ユカリ, Mikoshiro Yukari)
Voiced by: Yoshino Nanjō
Murafuji Sana (紫藤サナ, Murafuji Sana)
Voiced by: Rina Hidaka
Noa Aoi (蒼唯ノア, Aoi Noa)
Voiced by: Saori Hayami

== Media ==
Pole Princess is directed by Hitomi Ezoe and written by Touko Machida, with Yoshihiro Otobe serving as CG director, and Shūji Katayama and Kenta Higashiohji composing the music at Avex Pictures. Original character designs are provided by Tomari. KAORI of STUDIO TRANSFORM is the pole dancing supervisor. A prologue was streamed on YouTube on December 23, 2022. The series was streamed on YouTube from January 13 to April 3, 2023. An anime film premiered on November 23, 2023. The theme song, titled "Starlight Challenge" and performed by the cast, was released on July 26, 2023. A second anime film, titled Pole Princess!!: Croix du Nord, is set to premiere on January 29, 2027.
