= Ragna Crimson =

Japanese manga series by Daiki Kobayashi

- First tankōbon volume cover, featuring Ragna

ラグナクリムゾン (Raguna Kurimuzon)
- Genre: Action; Dark fantasy
- Manga
- Written by: Daiki Kobayashi
- Published by: Square Enix
- English publisher: NA: Square Enix
- Imprint: GC Joker
- Magazine: Monthly Gangan Joker
- Original run: March 22, 2017 – present
- Volumes: 17
- Anime television series
- Directed by: Ken Takahashi
- Produced by: Hiroyuki Aoi; Shouta Komatsu; Yuki Ogasawara; Tomoyuki Oowada; Hiromi Saitou; Hiroto Utsunomiya; Akiho Igari
- Written by: Deko Akao
- Music by: Kōji Fujimoto; Osamu Sasaki
- Studio: Silver Link
- Licensed by: Sentai Filmworks: SA/SEA: Muse Communication
- Original network: Tokyo MX, BS11, MBS
- English network: SEA: Animax Asia
- Original run: October 1, 2023 – March 31, 2024
- Episodes: 24
- icon

Ragna Crimson (Japanese: ラグナクリムゾン, Hepburn: Raguna Kurimuzon) is a Japanese manga series written and illustrated by Daiki Kobayashi. It has been serialized in Square Enix's Monthly Gangan Joker since March 2017, with its chapters collected in 17 tankōbon volumes as of May 2026. An anime television series adaptation produced by Silver Link aired from October 2023 to March 2024.

== Plot ==
In a world where dragons (ancient, fearsome creatures) are considered humanity's greatest adversaries, two ways exist to bring them down: freezing their blood with silverine, a rare aura granted by silver-infused weapons, or incinerating their bodies with the intense power of sunlight.

Leonica, a gifted young hunter, is skilled beyond her years, her strength and prowess unmatched. By her side is Ragna, a seemingly unremarkable companion who struggles to prove his worth. Often mocked by others, Ragna is branded as cursed, for dragons seem drawn to him, slaughtering those close to him in their wake. Yet Leonica sees something in him—potential that others overlook—and she chooses to partner with him on her dangerous hunts.

Ragna, deeply aware of his own lack of talent, places his trust in Leonica's abilities, convinced that she is immune to the misfortune that plagues him. But his world is shaken when he dreams of Leonica's death. Haunted by the dream, he fears it is a prophecy he must prevent. As the fated day approaches, Ragna encounters a mysterious figure from his future—his future self. This enigmatic version of Ragna grants him immense power and the memories of what is to come, preparing him to protect Leonica at any cost.

To fulfill his mission and avert the prophecy, Ragna must seek the aid of a shadowy figure known as Crimson. Together, they will fight to rid the world of dragons once and for all, facing impossible odds and unraveling a dark history that binds their fates. The journey ahead will challenge Ragna's beliefs, his strength, and ultimately, his loyalty to those he holds dear.

== Characters ==
Ragna (ラグナ, Raguna)
Voiced by: Chiaki Kobayashi, Nobutoshi Canna (future) (Japanese); Jack Stansbury, Ty Mahany (future), Chelsea McCurdy (young) (English)
Crimson (クリムゾン, Kurimuzon)
Voiced by: Ayumu Murase (Japanese); Jade Kelly (English)
Leonica (レオニカ, Reonika)
Voiced by: Inori Minase (Japanese); Cat Thomas (English)
Ultimatia (アルテマティア, Arutematia)
Voiced by: Reina Ueda (Japanese); Juliet Simmons (English)
Grymwelte (グリュムウェルテ, Guryumuwerute)
Voiced by: Takehito Koyasu (Japanese); Matthew David Rudd (English)
Disas Trois (ディザストロワ, Dizasu Torowa)
Voiced by: Shunsuke Takeuchi (Japanese); Alan Brinks (English)
Temruogtaf (メルグブデ, Merugubude)
Voiced by: Kōzō Shioya (Japanese); Rob Mungle (English)
Michael (ミハイル, Mihairu)
Voiced by: Yoshihito Sasaki (Japanese); Joe Daniels (English)
King Femud (フェムド王, Femudo Ō)
Voiced by: Takashi Matsuyama (Japanese); Josh Morrison (English)
Woltekamui (ウォルテカムイ, Worutekamui)
Voiced by: Junichi Suwabe, Mutsumi Tamura (young) (Japanese); Jeremy Gee, Chelsea McCurdy^{Ep. 23 credits} (young) (English)
Slime (スライム, Suraimu)
Voiced by: Fairouz Ai (Japanese); Margaret McDonald (English)
Chimera (キメラ, Kimera)
Voiced by: Mamiko Noto (Japanese); Annie Wild (English)
Golem (ゴーレム, Gōremu)
Voiced by: Hiroki Tōchi (Japanese); Gabriel Regojo, Sean Patrick Judge (Rowan) (English)
Staria Reze (スターリア・レーゼ, Sutāria Rēze)
Voiced by: Rina Hidaka (Japanese); Donna Bella Litton (English)
Hazella (へゼラ, Hezera) and Greya (グレア, Gurea)
Voiced by: Rio Tsuchiya (Japanese); Karlii Hoch (Hazella), Natalie Rial (Greya) (English)
Nebulim (ネビュリム, Nebyurimu)
Voiced by: Daiki Yamashita (Japanese); Chaney Moore, Antonio Lasanta (matured) (English)
Taratectora (タラテクトラ, Taratekutora)
Voiced by: Ryōta Takeuchi (Japanese); Daman Mills (English)
Olto Zora (オルト・ゾラ, Oruto Zora)
Voiced by: Ryōtarō Okiayu (Japanese); Nathan Wilson (English)
Borgius (ボルギウス, Borugiusu)
Voiced by: Kenyu Horiuchi, Katsuyuki Konishi (de-aged) (Japanese); James Belcher, David Matranga^{Ep. 19 credits} (de-aged) (English)
Dornea (ドルニーア, Dorunīa)
Voiced by: Keisuke Komoto (Japanese); Alejandro Saab (English)
Baron Sierra (バロム・シェエラ, Baromu Sheera)
Voiced by: Takuya Satō (Japanese); Ian Sinclair (English)
Chantioras (シャンティオラス, Shantiorasu)
Voiced by: Takuya Eguchi (Japanese); Scott Gibbs (English)
Isaac Stern (アイザック・スターン, Aizakku Sutān)
Voiced by: Tomoaki Maeno (Japanese); Benjamin McLaughlin (English)
Christopher Algren (クリストファー・オルグレン, Kurisutofā Oruguren)
Voiced by: Kenji Hamada, Mari Hino (young) (Japanese); Kregg Dailey, Annie Wild^{Ep. 22 credits} (young) (English)
Shin Cutlass (シン・カトラス, Shin Katorasu)
Voiced by: Tasuku Hatanaka (Japanese); Greg Cote (English)
Fu (フー, Fū)
Voiced by: Yukihiro Nozuyama (Japanese); James Marler (English)
Garm Ulban (ガルム・ウルバン, Garumu Uruban)
Voiced by: Shirō Saitō (Japanese); Jay Hickman (English)
Nazarena Teluzian (ナサレナ・テルジアン, Nasarena Terujian)
Voiced by: Yū Shimamura (Japanese); Rachael Messer (English)
Majorca Abbott (マジョルカ・アボット, Majoruka Abotto)
Voiced by: Marika Kōno (Japanese); Savanna Menzel (English)

== Media ==
=== Manga ===
Written and illustrated by Daiki Kobayashi, Ragna Crimson started in Square Enix's shōnen manga magazine Monthly Gangan Joker on March 22, 2017. Square Enix has collected its chapters into individual tankōbon volumes. The first volume was released on October 21, 2017. As of May 21, 2026, 17 volumes have been released.

In North America, the series is licensed for English release by Square Enix Manga & Books imprint.

==== Volumes ====
No.	Original release date	Original ISBN	English release date	English ISBN
1	October 21, 2017	978-4-7575-5506-8	February 23, 2021	978-1-64609-056-3
2	December 22, 2017	978-4-7575-5558-7	May 25, 2021	978-1-64609-057-0
3	July 21, 2018	978-4-7575-5790-1	August 24, 2021	978-1-64609-058-7
4	January 22, 2019	978-4-7575-5981-3	January 4, 2022	978-1-64609-059-4
5	July 22, 2019	978-4-7575-6180-9	April 12, 2022	978-1-64609-060-0
6	January 22, 2020	978-4-7575-6475-6	August 23, 2022	978-1-64609-094-5
7	July 21, 2020	978-4-7575-6756-6	November 22, 2022	978-1-64609-117-1
8	January 22, 2021	978-4-7575-7041-2	March 14, 2023	978-1-64609-131-7
9	August 20, 2021	978-4-7575-7428-1	June 27, 2023	978-1-64609-169-0
10	March 22, 2022	978-4-7575-7828-9	August 22, 2023	978-1-64609-198-0
11	August 22, 2022	978-4-7575-8084-8	November 21, 2023	978-1-64609-230-7
12	June 22, 2023	978-4-7575-8621-5	May 14, 2024	978-1-64609-262-8
13	November 21, 2023	978-4-7575-8907-0	August 20, 2024	978-1-64609-316-8
14	June 20, 2024	978-4-7575-9264-3	June 17, 2025	978-1-64609-392-2
15	January 21, 2025	978-4-7575-9622-1	June 6, 2026	978-1-64609-451-6
16	September 22, 2025	978-4-301-00066-2	—	—
17	May 21, 2026	978-4-301-00533-9	—	—

=== Anime ===
An anime television series adaptation was announced on March 19, 2022. It is produced by Silver Link and directed by Ken Takahashi, with scripts written by Deko Akao, character designs handled by Shinpei Aoki, and music composed by Kōji Fujimoto and Osamu Sasaki. The two consecutive-cour series aired from October 1, 2023, to March 31, 2024, on Tokyo MX and other networks. (Note: Tokyo MX and BS11 listed the series premiere on September 30 at 25:30, which is effectively October 1 at 1:30 a.m. JST.) The first opening theme song is "Roar", Ulma Sound Junction, while the first ending theme is "Rinkaku" (鱗角), performed by Watashi Kobayashi. The second opening theme song is "Kannōsei Liberation" (感脳性リベレーション; lit. 'Cerebral Liberation'), performed by saji, and the second ending theme song is "Sora ni Shimeyū" (空に標結う), performed again by Kobayashi.

At Anime Expo 2022, Sentai Filmworks announced that it had licensed the series outside of Asia. Muse Communication has licensed the series for South Asia and Southeast Asia. It premiered on Animax Asia on December 24, 2024.

==== Episodes ====
No.	Title	Directed by (Note: Information is taken from the ending credits of each episode.)	Storyboarded by	Original release date
1	"The Day the Reaper Was Born"; Transliteration: "Shinigami ga Umareta Hi" (Japanese: 死神が生まれた日)	Ken Takahashi	Ken Takahashi	October 1, 2023
Dragons terrorize humanity, giving rise to hunters who slay dragons with Silverine weapons. Two hunters in Lese Kingdom are Leonica and her unskilled partner Ragna, who functions more as her caretaker than a hunter. Ragna believes he is cursed; dragons seem drawn to him yet he always survives while others are slaughtered. Ragna dreams of an old man predicting Leonica's death. A dragon horde destroys Donapierru, a city that has famously not suffered a dragon attack in 10 years. The dragon horde then attacks every city in the kingdom, including Leonica and Ragna's home in Ronabera City. The dragons are led by Grymwelte of the Blood Wings, Superior Dragons that serve the Dragon God. Ragna recognises Grymwelte as Leonica's predicted murderer. Knocked unconscious Ragna falls into dreams of the future where the old man is revealed as his future self. Future-Ragna despises Ragna as a parasite who used Leonica to cover up his inadequacy. He reveals in his grief he trained beyond human endurance, and after 40 years discovered a power that gave his body the properties of Silverine, to kill dragons with a touch of his hand, but the power was worthless as it couldn't bring Leonica back. But now he has a chance to correct the past. He fuses himself to Ragna, giving him his memories and powers. Leonica confronts Grymwelte who reveals the Dragon God was protecting Donapierru as it housed his favourite cake shop, but when it went out of business the God ordered the entire Lese Kingdom destroyed. Ragna awakens and with his new Silverine Battle Arts Grymwelte is killed, saving Leonica. With Future-Ragna's memories Ragna is relieved that this time he was able to save Leonica. Future-Ragna and a mysterious God accept it is now up to Ragna and Leonica to create a future free of dragons. As Ragna recovers from his ordeal the city is attacked by an army of trees, watched by the mysterious God who remembers this was when he and Ragna first met.
2	"The Beginning of the Story"; Transliteration: "Monogatari no Hajimari" (Japanese: 物語の始まり)	Masamune Hirata	Masamune Hirata	October 8, 2023
The trees are controlled by the dragon Temruogtaf. Sensing Leonica in danger Ragna is forcibly awoken and punches Temruogtaf away. Ragna recognises Temruogtaf's maid as the mysterious God Crimson from Future-Ragna's memories, a Dragon Monarch who betrayed the Dragon God in the future and had most of his powers sealed away as punishment. To get revenge Crimson allied with Future-Ragna to kill all dragons by giving Ragna the Silverine Battle Arts. Crimson insists he is just a maid named Elise. Temruogtaf is killed by Ragna. Ragna tries to send Leonica away to safety, making her lose her temper. Ragna realises due to his former weakness Leonica is used to being in charge. Deciding it is time he acted responsibly he beats Leonica in a duel and forces her to evacuate with the civilians, leaving them both heartbroken. Crimson continues to deny his identity so, with advice from Future-Crimson, Ragna volunteers as Crimson's servant. After seeing Ragna's potential Crimson accepts Ragna's offer of servitude and gives him a poison that will only activate if Ragna betrays him. Crimson happily declares his intent to use Ragna to destroy the six dragon bloodlines, kill the Dragon God, then when he is the only dragon left, allow Ragna to kill him and end the age of dragons forever.
3	"Agitation"; Transliteration: "Sendo" (Japanese: 煽動)	Yuuta Maruyama	Seiji Okuda & Ken Takahashi	October 15, 2023
Ragna meets Crimson's existing servant, Slime. Crimson is irritated Ragna doesn't have all Future-Ragna's useful memories yet, they just appear when the right conditions are met. A group of hunters inform Ragna of a dragon Monarch that controls tornadoes, Disas Trois. Intrigued by Silverine Battle Arts Crimson paralyses Ragna to force him to recover from the immense damage it causes his muscles. He then manipulates the hunters' minds using their guilt over abandoning civilians to die and convinces them they have been granted Ragna's power while Ragna recovers. He also provides them modern machine guns and Silverine bullets generated by Ragna's power. Crimson worries what will happen if Leonica dies as she is Ragna's only motivation. He offers to kidnap her into a drugged sleep until the war is over, which Ragna angrily rejects, causing them to fight. Crimson reveals Ragna isn't cursed, he has just led an unlucky life so far. Slime observes Disas amusing himself torturing women but hides this in case the hunters ruin his plan trying to save them. As the hunters depart Crimson mocks Disas, his bloodline and the dragon God, hoping Disas will lose his temper and chase after them.
4	"Action"; Transliteration: "Akushon" (Japanese: アクション)	Mirai Minato	Gouichi Iwahata	October 22, 2023
Disas furiously chases their vehicle. Crimson reveals Silverine doesn't freeze dragon blood; it freezes dragon magic, so when the hunters shoot his magic tornado the tornado itself freezes. Disas fails to see Ragna generating a Silverine barrier that knocks him out of his tornado into the sunlight, allowing the hunters to behead him. Crimson gloats and Ragna realises Crimson barely considered it a hunt. To him it was a fun game. Despite their partnership he awaits the day he will be allowed to kill Crimson. Crimson wipes his existence from the hunters' memories, so they give Ragna full credit for helping kill Disas. The army orders every city to evacuate to Capital City; Crimson suspects a plot by another Monarch. It is shown 5 days prior First Monarch Ultimatia appeared to King Femud and apologised, claiming the destruction of Donapierru and the resulting war was caused by a subordinate dragon who misunderstood her orders. She hoped to spare humans pain by killing the entire kingdom at once painlessly, but now humans are suffering from the war, so she asked for Femud's help. Femud attempted to assassinate her with a solar weapon, but was killed by the dragon Borgius, disguised as Femud's royal advisor. Ultimatia manipulated time to restore Femud to a living state. His spirit completely broken, Femud agreed to help Ultimatia kill his entire kingdom painlessly, starting with evacuating them all to Capital City.
5	"Wing"; Transliteration: "Hane" (Japanese: 羽)	Yamato Oouchi	Kazuaki Mouri	October 29, 2023
Ultimatia is worried by the deaths of Monarchs Grymwelte, Disas and Temruogtaf by unknown killers, along with the death of Monarch Dornea at the hands of Femud's daughter, Princess Starlia. She sends Monarchs Taratectra and Olto Zora to kill Starlia and Monarch Woltekamui to investigate the other deaths. Ragna dreams a Future-Ragna memory where he was captured by the Monarchs. Ultimatia was so impressed by him she began transforming him into a Monarch, revealing all Monarchs were once humans. Ragna awakens disgusted by Ultimatia pretending her massacres were a kindness to humans. Despite her being the strongest living dragon Crimson decides it is vital she die next as they head to Capital City. Ragna discovers without Leonica he actually suffers from a fear or crowds. Crimson is confused; the city should be overflowing with 2 million refugees yet it is barely half full, meaning the Monarchs have already begun killing humans in large numbers, using an unknown method that doesn't draw attention. Crimson visits Golem, his servant who infiltrated the army as Colonel Rowan, and the shapeshifter Chimera, to inform them Ragna will attempt to assassinate Ultimatia. Ragna witnesses the army parading dragon corpses as proof they are winning the war, but he knows this is propaganda to keep the citizens pacified. He suddenly encounters Ultimatia in the crowd disguised as a human.
6	"Reunion"; Transliteration: "Saikai" (Japanese: 再会)	Shintarō Itoga	Koichi Ohata	November 5, 2023
Golem shows Crimson footage of Ultimatia reviving King Femud with Time Control magic. Ragna freezes with indecision as Ultimatia has a human child with her. Woltekamui locates the hunters and demands to know who helped them kill Disas. Ultimatia claims to be helping the child find his missing parents. They are interrupted by Monarch Nebulim, allowing Ragna to slip away. Crimson identifies a weakness with Ultimatia's magic; in order to rewind Femud's death she had to stop pausing time around herself. This means if they kill her and she rewinds her death she will be stuck in that moment repeatedly until her magic runs out and her death becomes permanent. Ragna cannot reconcile his desire to kill Ultimatia with his tactical decision to run away and disappears into the city. Slime reports Ragna's disappearance to Crimson. Spying on Ultimatia Ragna learns it is Nebulim killing the citizens using a barrier; anyone inside the barrier painlessly disappears from existence without a trace. He is enraged Ultimatia only helped the child find his parents because she thought it a kindness they at least die together. Despite Crimson's orders Ragna attacks and kills Nebulim and Ultimatia. Ultimatia manages to reverse her death but Ragna begins killing her over and over again, leaving her no time to counterattack as she tries desperately to revive herself multiple times.
7	"Act and Guilt"; Transliteration: "Sakui to Kashaku" (Japanese: 作為と呵責)	Ken Takahashi & Masamune Hirata	Hiroaki Yoshikawa	November 12, 2023
Future-Ragna rejected the Monarch transformation by stabbing himself with his own sword. After the Monarchs left Future-Crimson retrieved the body, intending to revive him. In the present Crimson is furious Ragna disobeyed him but decides all he can do is watch what happens. Borgius attempts to assist Ultimatia but is prevented by Chimera with a sniper rifle. Slime devours a recovering Nebulim to stop him interfering. Fearing death Ultimatia activates an emergency spell and Ragna finds himself sent back in time to before their battle even began, when the army paraded the dragon corpses. Frozen in that moment with Ragna unable to move Ultimatia still decides to kill him kindly, yet hesitates from fear when she sees Ragna begin to move despite time being frozen. She orders Femud to target Ragna with his solar weapon but Ragna begins moving normally, which should only be possible for a Monarch she created. She panics as Ragna rushes at her, but he abruptly collapses from overusing his powers. Femud fires the weapon at the helpless Ragna, yet it has no effect as Crimson protects him. Crimson is disappointed at Ragna's failure and must quickly decide what to do next.
8	"A Painful Blow"; Transliteration: "Itamashī Dageki" (Japanese: 痛ましい打撃)	Yuusuke Sekine & Shin Oonuma	Akira Nishimori	November 19, 2023
Crimson realises Ultimatia is experiencing fear for the first time, making her vulnerable. To unbalance her further he sets off bombs around the city, bringing death and pain to thousands. Ultimatia breaks down as Nebulim prevents her rewinding so many deaths, lest her magic run out. Crimson retrieves Ragna and retreats into his Globe Chamber, a spatial gateway between dimensions, planning to retreat to the moon for a few years. Nebulim, cursing his weakness when he is supposedly the Monarch with the highest potential, abruptly matures in power. Dreaming of Leonica, Ragna awakens and activates Silverine Battle Arts. Crimson panics as the silverine cracks the Globe Chamber, allowing Nebulim to sense their presence. His plan ruined, Crimson remembers a woman from his past just as the Globe implodes, randomly teleporting him and Ragna to a Lese army base commanded by Princess Starlia. Born without arms she possesses eyes that detect all aura, and with powerful telekinesis she controls prosthetic silverine arms and weapons. At only 16 she commands the Argentum Dragon Slayers and killed Monarch Dornea by herself. Crimson loathes her as her eyes make lying to her impossible. He knows Argentum are planning to escape from Lese so it will be safer if he and Ragna go with them. Unfortunately, that means he must somehow deceive Starlia without letting his emotional aura expose his lies.
9	"Negotiation and True Nature"; Transliteration: "Kōshō to honshō" (Japanese: 交渉と本性)	Masamune Hirata	Masamune Hirata	November 26, 2023
Crimson claims to be a magician working in Capital City. Expertly controlling his aura he claims he and Ragna were caught in an explosion while teleporting away from a dragon attack and teleported to the army base by accident. However, Starlia reveals her eyes can also detect personality, so while Crimson's aura seems honest, his personality screams darkness and murder, so she decides to execute him. Ragna saves him at the last second and Starlia, with her unusual senses, perceives Ragna as the perfect fusion of human, silverine sword, and strength; in short, her ideal man. Overcome with maidenly embarrassment Starlia is speechless in Ragna's presence and imprisons them while she decides what to do next. After a short, vicious argument with Ragna about the failed attack on Ultimatia, Crimson reveals the base is in considerable danger. Starlia's soldiers gossip about Ragna defeating Garm, Starlia's general and greatest swordsman in Lese, and Starlia's first crush on a man. Starlia's maid, Nazarena, is glad Starlia is in love but also reminds her they are currently at war and she has responsibilities. Ultimatia has a nightmare of the Dragon God being disappointed with her, further inflaming her fear and uncertainty.
10	"Stakes and Cooperation"; Transliteration: "Rigai to Kyōtō" (Japanese: 利害と共闘)	Yuuta Maruyama	Koichi Ohata	December 3, 2023
Due to their situation Starlia decides their only option is to flee the kingdom with the 1500 citizens taking refuge at the base, once the teleportation circle is ready. Crimson points out the flaws in this plan and offers to let Starlia borrow Ragna as a weapon against Monarch Olto-Zora, whose blood can exude a variety of chemicals for instant death, fear, or hypnosis. Starlia tries to refuse due to her suspicions of Crimson, but she is helpless against Ragna and reluctantly agrees, though it makes her seem like a lovesick tsundere in front of her soldiers. Ultimatia begins to lose her time manipulation powers and believes the Dragon God is punishing her. Woltekamui claims it is actually her own doing; she is so convinced Ragna will kill her she has already surrendered, mentally speaking, and is just waiting to die without resisting. Professing his perverse and eternal love for her, Woltekamui undermines her devotion to their mission of merciful death, forcing her to admit her deep, personal hatred of Ragna. She orders Woltekamui to kill Ragna by any means so she won't be afraid anymore. Nebulim is jealous Woltekamui has gotten closer to Ultimatia's heart. Woltekamui excitedly remembers the final words of the hunters who helped kill Disas; the Reaper will kill you all.
11	"Tactics and Knowledge"; Transliteration: "Senjutsu to Chishiki" (Japanese: 戦術と知識)	Nobutaka Chikahashi	Gouichi Iwahata	December 10, 2023
Ragna begins infusing his power into the soldiers weapons; though he is confused many challenge him to duels, including stubborn commander Shin, convinced he is an unworthy match for Starlia. Twin commanders Greya and Hesela like Ragna, but when Slime makes fun of their part dragon blood they reveal their dark personalities twisted by years of childhood abuse as circus freaks, and subject Slime to violent, disturbing tortures. Fu, a Thaumaturge magician, and his team cannot create a magic circle capable of teleporting 1800 people as the circle design is far too complex and lacks a sufficient power source. Fu considers deserting to save himself but is forced to stay when Crimson detects his intentions and mockingly offers to help design a functional circle. Olto-Zora and Taratectra appear to have their own agenda regarding the other Monarchs. Ultimatia reconsiders and instead orders Woltekamui to bodyguard her alongside Nebulim instead of hunting Ragna, disappointing him. As Ultimatia is powerless Olto-Zora sends Borgius and 40,000 dragons to finish killing the humans by devouring them. Olto-Zora and Taratectra take over hunting Ragna but grudgingly agree to include Woltekamui if they discover Ragna is working with the Argentum Dragon Slayers.
12	"Determination and Readiness"; Transliteration: "Ketsui to Junbi" (Japanese: 決意と準備)	Yamato Oouichi	Akira Nishimori	December 17, 2023
Crimson and Ragna agree Ragna would lose against Woltekamui, so Crimson forbids Ragna using his powers against Taratectra and Olto Zora, since exposing his presence will definitely cause Woltekamui to join the fight. Slime returns traumatised from his punishment, so Crimson erases his memory. Crimson tells Ragna to infuse his remaining power into a single sword, which shouldn't attract Woltekamui's attention. Starlia gives Ragna one of her own swords and informs him once the civilians are teleported to Solaria she will bargain for their safety by joining the Solarian Church as a Dragon Scourge, but if she dies she asks Ragna to do it instead. Ragna provokes her into rejecting any idea she might die, infuses three of her swords and swears to help her survive. Despite feeling humiliated Starlia loves him even more and is determined to become worthy of him. Olto Zora slaughters many humans. Due to his extreme old age Borgius knows he will die soon anyway, so he volunteers to use all the human blood to temporarily regenerate his body for one last suicide attack. 10,000 dragons attack the base and Ragna begins to duel Taratectra.
13	"Hero of the Battle"; Transliteration: "Senjō no Shuyaku" (Japanese: 戦場の主役)	Kentarou Iino & Tomonori Mine	Mina Okita	January 14, 2024 (Note: Tokyo MX and BS11 list the second cour's premiere on January 13, 2024, at 25:00, which is effectively January 14 at 1:00 a.m. JST.)
Starlia's men are traumatised when they are forced to fight and kill Olto Zora's army of chemically hypnotised civilians, many of whom are still awake enough to beg for their lives before dying. In response Starlia sends Greya, Hesela and their flying squad to locate Olto Zora. After a brutal fight Ragna only succeeds in cutting off Taratectra's arm. Still unaware Ragna is the silverine warrior he is searching for Taratectra leaves the injured Ragna to be killed by his dragon servants. Ragna is abruptly rescued by Shin and Garm. Outraged by Ragna's suicidal insistence on fighting alone, Shin challenges him to another duel despite being surrounded by dragons. Ragna loses the duel and is ashamed his stubbornness has allowed Shin's determination to surpass his own. Slime agrees and abandons Ragna to help Shin and Garm follow Taratectra. Olto Zora detects magic being drained from his dead dragons to fuel Crimson's improved teleportation circle, so he realises Starlia is only delaying him so they can escape and don't intend to fight to the death.
14	"Impatience and Vigilance"; Transliteration: "Aseri to Keikai" (Japanese: 焦りと警戒)	Naoki Hishikawwa	Hiromitsu Kanazawa	January 21, 2024
Olto Zora spreads out his civilian soldiers as far as possible, doubling how much magic Starlia needs to rescue them by teleporting them away from him. Olto Zora also sends out 40 mature dragons with stronger magic to find the teleportation circle. One mature dragon from Ultimatia's bloodline uses similar time-stopping magic to kill dozens of soldiers, but she is killed by Crimson using a sunlight grenade. Crimson also reveals he has hypnotised and given weapons to the 1500 civilians waiting to be teleported, who now mindlessly fight against Olto Zora's drugged civilians and the mature dragons to add their magic to the circle. Seeing Fu kill a mature dragon by himself Crimson considers hypnotising the entire Argentum Corps into his servants but the base starts to collapse from the constant damage to Starlia's magic barrier. Starlia makes a mistake and a dragon severs her leg. Olto Zora gloats but Taratectra informs him he is still being chased by Ragna, Shin and Garm who have now killed one third of their dragons. Despite being close to death Ragna feels an unusual connection to Future-Ragna, who in his grief would drive himself to such extremes in every battle he fought and yet always survived.
15	"Latent Awakening"; Transliteration: "Senzai Suru Kakusei" (Japanese: 潜在する覚醒)	Mika Inoue	Koichi Ohata	January 28, 2024
The unusual connection increases Ragna's control of silverine. Starlia's men help her survive. Ragna pushes himself even harder, desperate to unlock the full power of Future-Ragna, the kind only achieved by surviving what cannot be survived. Olto Zora starts to panic as Ragna draws closer, plus he worries about who is directing the human defences as they are using tactics uncomfortably similar to his own. Crimson seizes control of the teleportation circle, intending to escape with Ragna, the soldiers and the hypnotised thaumaturge magicians but leaving the civilians behind. Fu is the only one who can activate the circle but is too powerful to be hypnotised so he refuses to obey. Olto Zora finally realises Ragna is the Reaper but hesitates to summon Waltekamui in case there is a plan to assassinate Ultimatia once Waltekamui leaves her unprotected. Crimson prepares a spell to make Fu fall in love with him, but Fu's sister Majo breaks her hypnosis to save him and is shot. Crimson is shocked when Majo abruptly reveals her magic is teleportation magic and before she collapses she teleports him far away to a ruined city, breaking the hypnosis on the other magicians who rush to help her and Fu recover.
16	"Will of Resistance"; Transliteration: "Aragau Ishi" (Japanese: 抗う意思)	Junya Koshiba	Kazuaki Mouri	February 4, 2024
Olto Zora decides to kill Starlia. Having fallen from a great height while being teleported Crimson's bones are shattered and he passes out. Starlia and her surviving men approach Olto Zora's hiding place, so he releases chemicals to turn his dragons savagely insane and many soldiers are killed. On seeing Starlia's face Olto Zora realises she resembles his former master, a Solarian princess named Lakucia, so he fails to notice Starlia's assassin Nazarena sneak up and stab him in the heart. This reveals his body is fake and his real body is underground. As he is dragged to the surface by Starlia's telekinesis he recalls he was Lakucia's soldier and he rejoices at being reminded of his love for her, even if it means Starlia kills him. Borgius, having regained his former power for his suicide attack, joins the battle and saves Olto Zora. Seeing Starlia unconscious Olto Zora recalls his human past, his friends, Lakucia's murder by Waltekamui and his transformation into a Monarch. Feeling unable to kill her he invites Starlia to become a Monarch. Enraged Starlia summons a giant silverine spear infused with the willpower of all surviving corps members, which her subordinate Christopher uses, not to kill Olto Zora, but to hurl at the far away Taratectra, causing a massive explosion.
17	"My Comrade"; Transliteration: "Watashi no dōshi" (Japanese: 私の同志)	Naoyoshi Kusaka	Akira Nishimori	February 11, 2024
The spear glances off Taratectra's armour but is caught in mid-air by Ragna. Taratectra narrowly escapes dying instantly in the explosion but is still mortally injured. Having also been a human soldier who served Princess Lakucia Taratectra bids farewell to Olto Zora as a comrade then commits suicide in a massive explosion. Ragna struggles to contain the blast which is powerful enough to kill everyone in the forest. Starlia senses Ragna keeping some power in reserve to stop her inferior sword breaking, so she astral-projects her spirit to his side to lend him some of her own power and glimpses Future-Ragna inside his soul. With her help Ragna stops the explosion and saves everyone. Starlia cries for Ragna; the unfairness of someone so honourable and powerful doomed to a future of loneliness and pain, so she offers him a better future with her if he abandons Crimson. Fu activates the circle to begin teleporting everyone, but in a split second Waltekamui appears, beheads Starlia and challenges Ragna to fight. Ragna engages him in a vicious fight of pure instinct and brutal violence but with most of his power already spent he soon collapses unable to move. Suddenly, he awakens far away in the same ruined city, with a still living Starlia.
18	"End of the Battle to the Death"; Transliteration: "Shitō no Owari" (Japanese: 死闘の終わり)	Masamune Hirata	Masamune Hirata	February 18, 2024
Starlia reveals the teleportation circle worked and the other survivors are nearby. She thanks Ragna for his help and declares she must forge a new sword; Silver Comet, the perfect sword she can see in her mind but has never successfully forged. Ragna abruptly awakens, finding the teleportation circle did work but everything else was a dream. Starlia is gone, only 80 corps members and 600 civilians survived, and the civilians are angry without shelter, food or any plan what to do next. Ragna suddenly senses and kills Ultimatia, only for time to stop as a dozen copies of her appear. She explains she is actually Carla, a Dragon Scourge of the Solarian Church revered as the Time Saintess, and while she resembles Ultimatia's face and magic, she is not her. After rewinding the dead copy to revive her she reveals Starlia's assassin Nazarena is actually a church member sent to manipulate Starlia into joining the church. Without Starlia the church refuses to offer sanctuary to the 600 civilians, unless Ragna replaces Starlia and becomes a Scourge. Furious at being manipulated Ragna refuses and instead forces them to accept the civilians in exchange for him hunting Ultimatia. After this, Ragna follows a signal that leads him to a recovered Crimson.
19	"Reason to Fight"; Transliteration: "Tatakau Riyū" (Japanese: 戦う理由)	Jun Fukuta	Akira Nishimori	February 25, 2024
Crimson reveals his Globe Chamber repaired itself, so they teleport to the moon. Crimson plans to train Ragna for three years, but Ragna shares his belief Starlia survived. Crimson dismisses this and tries to manipulate Ragna into obeying, but he refuses. Ragna collapses as his refusal activates the poison Crimson gave him to prevent betrayal. Crimson plans to dissect him to salvage his Silverine Battle Arts but impossibly Ragna survives and calls out Crimson for his lack of commitment to his goal, pointing out he has survived countless deaths by hiding his heart away from his body like a coward. Ragna returns to Earth where the corps has also realised Starlia is alive as her silverine creations are still functioning. Woltekamui holds Starlia hostage, having reattached her head but cursing her to die again if she escapes. He then demands she forge Silver Comet for Ragna as he is determined to fight him again and wants Ragna at his strongest. Borgius worries Taratectra's death has sent Olto Zora insane. Nebulim reverse engineers Crimson's globe chamber to create a sun shield over the city. Woltekamui hopes killing Ragna will make him stronger than the Dragon God. Starlia begins forging Silver Comet. Fu creates another teleportation circle to take the corps to the city but is forced to ask Carla for the magic to activate it. She agrees but as payment demands the instructions to create her own circles and blood samples from Ragna, Fu and Majo. Despite sulking Crimson deduces Ultimatia has lost her time magic. Ordering his servants to prepare for battle Crimson plans to let Ragna distract the dragons while he kills Ultimatia himself.
20	"Just Watch Me"; Transliteration: "Ore o Miteitekure" (Japanese: オレを見ていてくれ)	Michiru Itabisashi	Kazuaki Mouri	March 3, 2024
The corps scouts report every citizen in the royal capital is dead and their bodies used as food for a giant tree. Only the palace is undamaged where the Monarchs are holding Starlia. Garm asks the healed Ragna for a duel, confirming Garm has actually grown stronger and Ragna has greater control of his power. The corps and Ragna teleport to the capital with Carla casting a spell to protect them from Ultimatia's time magic for 3 minutes, at the cost of a dozen of her copies dying of old age. Crimson sends Golem piloting a giant robot warrior and Chimera to battle Borgius, who absorbs the fully grown tree to become the largest dragon yet. Olto Zora attacks the corps in revenge for Taratectra while Ragna faces Woltekamui. Ragna finds Starlia slowly dying from Olto Zora's worst poison which has no cure. She passes him the sword she forged but weeps as it is still imperfect and not worthy to be called the Silver Comet. Nonetheless, Ragna swears he can beat Woltekamui with it and hopes she lives long enough to see it. Woltekamui attacks with his sword Lightning Claw, but Ragna cuts him in half with ease. Excited for a real fight Woltekamui heals then assumes his true Lightning Dragon form.
21	"Words Aren't Needed"; Transliteration: "Kotoba wa Iranai" (Japanese: 言葉はいらない)	Jun Fukuta	Kazuaki Mouri	March 10, 2024
In the chaos Nazarena escapes with Starlia. During his battle Ragna accidentally throws Woltekamui into Golem, damaging his combat suit and limiting his ability to fight Borgius. The Corps fight and begin to overwhelm Olto Zora but Starlia's creations abruptly stop working, suggesting she is close to death. Olto Zora takes advantage of their grief, severs Shin's arm and leg and kills Garm. Ragna pushes Woltekamui out of the atmosphere to fight him in space where the sun is strongest. Starlia dies in Nazarena's arms, causing her to briefly remember raising Starlia from childhood before leaving her body behind and walking away. Crimson easily defeats Nebulim's security barriers, allowing Slime to swallow Nebulim and leaving Ultimatia defenceless. Crimson attacks Ultimatia, having retrieved his heart from its hiding place, sacrificing his perfect immortality in exchange for his old powers as a Monarch. Using bullets he once created to kill himself, Crimson wounds Ultimatia with injuries that won't heal. Panicking, she sets off a huge magical explosion that engulfs them both. Fu injects himself with dragon blood and mutates into a half dragon to fight the deranged Olto Zora but cannot avoid being cut in half. Despite losing half his limbs Shin is determined to fight until the end.
22	"The Winged Monarch"; Transliteration: "Tsubasa no O" (Japanese: 翼の王)	Yamato Oouchi	Koichi Ohata	March 17, 2024
Shin prevents Olto Zora killing Greya. Fu requires time for one last attack so Christopher distracts Olto Zora while recalling his life before and after meeting Starlia. Fu activates his spell, weakening Olto Zora to the point of death as well as killing himself and seemingly most of the corps, leaving only Isaac who delivers the final blow, killing Olto Zora. Nazarena returns to help Isaac. Crimson switches to psychic manipulation, weakening Ultimatia's confidence and faith in the Dragon God. He also reveals Ultimatia was once one of Carla's copies, Number 19835, but the constant war eventually drove her to become a Monarch. The disappearance of Nebulim and his anti-sun barriers allows Golem to use his solar powered weapons to burn Borgius to ashes. Within Slime's stomach Nebulim knows he is close to death so he psychically transfers all his evolved power to Borgius, giving him almost as much power as God. The new Borgius kills both Golem and Chimera then kills Slime but can only recover part of Nebulims skeleton. Enraged, Borgius begins breaking through Crimsons barrier to protect Ultimatia.
23	"Lightning God"; Transliteration: "Raijin" (Japanese: 雷神)	Masamune Hirata	Kazuaki Mouri	March 24, 2024
24	"Light"; Transliteration: "Hikari" (Japanese: 光)	Ken Takahashi	Akira Nishimori	March 31, 2024
