= My One-Hit Kill Sister =

Japanese web novel series and its adaptation(s)

- First tankōbon volume cover of the manga adaptation, featuring Maya Ikusaba (front) and Asahi Ikusaba (back)

異世界ワンターンキル姉さん〜姉同伴の異世界生活はじめました〜 (Isekai Wan Tān Kiru Nee-san: Ane Dōhan no Isekai Seikatsu Hajimemashita)
- Genre: Fantasy comedy; Isekai
- Novel series
- Written by: Konoe
- Published by: Shōsetsuka ni Narō
- Original run: December 28, 2019 – June 17, 2023
- Manga
- Written by: Konoe
- Illustrated by: Kenji Taguchi
- Published by: Shogakukan
- Imprint: Shōnen Sunday Comics Special
- Magazine: Sunday Webry; Monthly Sunday Gene-X
- Original run: March 6, 2020 – July 28, 2023
- Volumes: 12
- Anime television series
- Directed by: Hiroaki Takagi
- Produced by: Yoshinobu Iwatani; Yuuki Konishi; Shinji Oomori; Fumihiro Ozawa; Taku Katou; Hiroshi Nishiyama
- Written by: Yōhei Kashii
- Music by: Shusei
- Studio: Gekkou
- Licensed by: Crunchyroll
- Original network: Tokyo MX, SUN, BS Fuji, AT-X
- Original run: April 8, 2023 – June 24, 2023
- Episodes: 12
- icon

My One-Hit Kill Sister (異世界ワンターンキル姉さん〜姉同伴の異世界生活はじめました〜, Isekai Wan Tān Kiru Nee-san: Ane Dōhan no Isekai Seikatsu Hajimemashita; "One Turn Kill Sister in Another World: I Started Living in Another World with My Older Sister") is a Japanese web novel series written by Konoe. It was serialized online on the user-generated novel publishing website Shōsetsuka ni Narō from December 2019 to June 2023. A manga adaptation, illustrated by Kenji Taguchi, was serialized online via Shogakukan's Sunday Webry website, as well as the seinen manga magazine Monthly Sunday Gene-X, from March 2020 to July 2023. It chapters were collected in twelve tankōbon volumes. An anime television series adaptation by Gekkou aired from April to June 2023.

== Plot ==
High school student Asahi Ikusaba, an RPG otaku who has always dreamed of adventuring in another world, gets his wish when he is rendered comatose after getting hit by a car while saving a child. Finding himself in a fantasy world, he pursues his desire to become an adventurer. However, he is outmatched by high-level monsters he stumbles across on his very first quest. Suddenly, his overprotective older sister Maya appears and saves his life. Partnering up with him, the two begin to make their way in this new world, even though Asahi comes to fear his sister's overbearing affection for him more than the various dangers this world has to offer.

== Characters ==
=== Super Asahi Legion ===
Asahi Ikusaba (軍場 朝陽, Ikusaba Asahi)
Voiced by: Yuki Sakakihara
A high school student whose consciousness was displaced into another world after getting hit by a runaway car. Soon after his arrival, he tried to establish himself as an adventurer, only to find that he has neither a super-high level nor any superpowers. When Maya follows him into the other world, he finds himself overwhelmed by both her paradoxically superior abilities and her smothering affection for him. Despite Maya doing all the work, Asahi ends up being hailed as the hero.
Maya Ikusaba (軍場 真夜, Ikusaba Maya)
Voiced by: Haruka Shiraishi
Asahi's tomboyish older sister who has an obsessive brother complex, which oftentimes drifts off into a more sexual theme. After her brother's accident, she knocked her head against a wall, lost consciousness, and found herself in the same other world as him. Upon her arrival, her desire to protect Asahi bestowed her with tremendous physical and magical cheat abilities, and she makes herself his silent adventuring partner, who keeps her abilities secret from the public eye. She easily takes this arrangement and Asahi's resulting fame in stride, as her only concern in life is to keep him safe.
Kilmaria (キルマリア, Kirumaria)
Voiced by: Ami Koshimizu
A powerful general of the army of the Demon King. She thrives on a challenge for her abilities, but usually finds herself too powerful for most opponents. After encountering Asahi by chance—and trying to destroy him on the basis of his growing heroic reputation—she meets her match in the overprotective Maya.
Sophie (ソフィ, Sofi)
Voiced by: Azumi Waki
Gloria Brigandine (グローリア・ブリガンダイン, Gurōria Burigandain)
Voiced by: Sora Tokui
Kuon (クオン)
Voiced by: Konomi Kohara

=== Other characters ===
Tanya (ターニャ, Tānya)
Voiced by: Rio Tsuchiya
A clerk of the adventuring guild in the city/town of Epiphoneia in the kingdom of Caesarion, the domain Asahi and Maya end up in. She quickly becomes Asahi's greatest fan after "his" first adventuring successes.
Siegfried (ジークフリート, Jīkufurīto)
Voiced by: Yuma Uchida
A high-level adventuring fighter, also known as "Dragon Hunter", and leader of the Clan Balmuc adventuring group.

== Media ==
=== Novel ===
Written by Konoe, My One-Hit Kill Sister was serialized online as a web novel on the user-generated novel publishing site Shōsetsuka ni Narō from December 28, 2019, to June 17, 2023. A print version of the novel has not been released.

=== Manga ===
A manga adaptation by Kenji Taguchi started serialization online via Shogakukan's Sunday Webry website on March 6, 2020, as well as the seinen manga magazine Monthly Sunday Gene-X since April 17 of the same year. The series finished on July 28, 2023. Shogakukan collected its chapters in twelve tankōbon volumes, released from July 10, 2020, to September 12, 2023.

==== Volumes ====
No.	Release date	ISBN
1	July 10, 2020	978-4-09-850192-2
2	November 12, 2020	978-4-09-850318-6
3	March 12, 2021	978-4-09-850466-4
4	May 12, 2021	978-4-09-850567-8
5	August 12, 2021	978-4-09-850681-1
6	November 12, 2021	978-4-09-850773-3
7	March 11, 2022	978-4-09-851019-1
8	August 12, 2022	978-4-09-851213-3
9	January 12, 2023	978-4-09-851526-4
10	April 12, 2023	978-4-09-852024-4
11	June 12, 2023	978-4-09-852093-0
12	September 12, 2023	978-4-09-852840-0

=== Anime ===
On March 11, 2022, an anime adaptation was announced on the seventh volume of the manga. It was later confirmed to be a television series animated by Gekkou and directed by Hiroaki Takagi, with Yōhei Kashii in charge of series' scripts, Yūji Hamada designing the characters, and Kenichi Kanagawa designing the monsters. It aired from April 8 to June 24, 2023, on Tokyo MX and other networks. TrySail performed the first opening theme song "Karei One Turn" (華麗ワンターン; "Splendid One Turn") and the second opening theme song "Follow You!", while Valis performed the ending theme song "Mukyū Platonic" (無窮プラトニック; "Forever Platonic").

On August 6, 2022, during their industry panel at Crunchyroll Expo, Crunchyroll streamed the series worldwide outside of Asia.

==== Episodes ====
No.	Title (Note: All English titles are taken from Crunchyroll.)	Directed by (Note: Information is taken from the ending credits of each episode.)	Written by	Storyboarded by	Original release date (Note: Episodes were released on select platforms a day before their air dates on television.)
1	"Did You Call for Your Big Sister?"; Transliteration: "Ane o Yonda ka" (Japanese: 姉を呼んだか)	Hiroaki Takagi	Yōhei Kashii	Hiroaki Takagi	April 8, 2023
In an alternate world, Asahi recalls in his previous life he was hit by a car and reincarnated. After he joined the adventurer guild he encountered a Wyvern on a quest and discovered his stats are all level one, and his one skill is Stone Throwing. Maya abruptly appears and kills the Wyvern with one overpowered hit. Maya, who possesses a brother-complex for him, explained Asahi is actually in a coma back in Japan, so she hit herself on the head many times and has now joined him, but has no way to get back to their world and are trapped. Asahi realizes only she possesses max level stats and dozens of skills. Free of Japan’s taboo against incest, Maya now spends her days trying to seduce him, but her victories against monsters while protecting him are frequently mistaken for Asahi’s victories. As a result, Asahi is promoted to Ogre rank despite being possibly the weakest human alive and is forced to maintain the lie since falsifying an official rank is punishable by execution. During a parade for Siegfried the strongest living adventurer, a drunk ex adventurer causes trouble and the crowd urges Asahi to defeat him, which he does with secret help from Maya, who demands a kiss as her payment.
2	"You Call Me Your Big Sister?"; Transliteration: "Warawa o Ane to Yobu ka" (Japanese: わらわを姉と呼ぶか)	Taichi Atarashi; Hamachi	Chabō Higurashi	Taichi Atarashi; Hamachi	April 15, 2023
Siegfried and his party are defeated by Kilmaria of Corruption, one of the Demon King’s Six Generals, and bemoan her lack of a strong opponent to fight. Determined to grow stronger, Asahi sneaks away from Maya to complete a quick mushroom gathering quest on his own. He is attacked by a Kaiser-bear monster but is rescued by a bored Kilmaria, who actually develops a crush on him seeing him panicking and needing rescuing. She then reveals she has sought out Asahi to fight him to the death, believing he might be the next hero. Asahi flees, leaving her confused why he won’t fight her. Maya arrives and mistakenly deduces Kilmaria is a temptress seeking to steal Asahi’s virginity. After a violent duel that flattens the forest Kilmaria is defeated and expects to be executed, so she is surprised when Asahi convinces Maya to spare her and decides they are the strangest, most interesting siblings she has ever met.
3	"My Sister, Maya-nee, Is All I Need"; Transliteration: "Ore ni wa Maya-nē Dake de Ii" (Japanese: 俺にはマヤ姉だけでいい)	Akio Hosoya	Chabō Higurashi	Yūichi Abe	April 22, 2023
Asahi reaches level 10 and unlocks the skill Escape in order to avoid Maya’s attempts to grope him. This proves pointless as he can only use it once a day and is easily caught by her second groping attempt. Asahi considers finding other people to form an official party and, while speaking with guild secretary Tanya, learns of Siegfried’s recent defeat. Asahi intervenes with thugs harassing a drunk, but when the drunk defeats the thugs Asahi realises it is Siegfried, having lost his confidence and disbanding his party. He also reveals his party members actually have pretty rotten personalities and advises Asahi to avoid forming his own party. Tanya sends Asahi on an emergency quest to slay wyverns, so quickly he has no chance to bring Maya and ends up facing them alone. Fortunately he is saved by Kilmaria, followed closely by Maya. Insulted by Maya ignoring her, Kilmaria kidnaps Asahi to force Maya to agree to a rematch. In the confusion Asahi is grabbed by a wyvern and they work together to save him. Kilmaria decides to leave peacefully. Asahi decides he doesn’t need any party except for Maya, who becomes so emotional she leaps on him straight away.
4	"The Big Plan for the Home of the Ikusaba Brother and Sister"; Transliteration: "Ikusaba Kyōdai no Mai Hōmu Dai Sakusen" (Japanese: 軍場姉弟のマイホーム大作戦)	Kiyotaka Takezawa	Nora Mōri	Kiyotaka Takezawa	April 29, 2023
Asahi is sent to investigate a haunted house on the promise he can have the house for free if he expels the troublesome ghost. Unable to drive away the overpowered Maya the ghost resorts to possessing Maya to gain control of her power. Fearing for the rest of the world if Maya’s power is used for evil Asahi fearfully decides he must kill her or die trying. Luckily, Kilmaria appears, but since Asahi forbids her from damaging the house by fighting she challenges the ghost to arm wrestling instead. Kilmaria loses, so Asahi resorts to yelling for Maya to return as he misses her. Maya expels the ghost, purifies it and forces it to pass on. She then gropes Asahi gleefully, revealing she was never possessed, she just wanted to hear him say something loving to her, which he did. They report their success and are granted ownership of the house. Asahi must once again take the credit for Maya’s victory, but as a result of defeating a ghost even Holy Clerics couldn’t expel Tanya assigns him dozens of incomplete quests that all involve powerful ghosts or evil spirits.
5	"The Ikusaba Brother and Sister's Big Dungeon Exploration Plan"; Transliteration: "Ikusaba Kyōdai no Danjon Tansaku Dai Sakusen" (Japanese: 軍場姉弟のダンジョン探索大作戦)	Mitsutaka Noshitani	Yōhei Kashii	Mashami Watanabe	May 6, 2023
Asahi is asked to explore a brand new dungeon, only recently discovered after Maya and Kilmaria’s first duel uncovered the buried entrance. Asahi forbids Maya using her power in case she collapses the entire dungeon. Reaching the dungeon boss chamber Asahi discovers the Kaiser-bear Kilmaria killed was the dungeon master, and only its cubs are left. Asahi decides to tell the guild the dungeon is too dangerous to open for other adventurers, ensuring the cubs are left in peace. In town Asahi encounters Kilmaria disguised as a human so she can study human culture. After spending time together Kilmaria offers to make Asahi a demon with powers equal to Maya, but he refuses. Seeing them together while collecting his quest reward Tanya is unhappy at Asahi. Kilmaria later discovers human alcohol and drinks so much it costs Asahi his entire reward. Siegfried encounters them and can’t work out why Kilmaria scares him. Kilmaria follows Asahi home where, despite her irritation, Maya lets her stay for dinner. Kilmaria enjoys Maya’s cooking so much she announces she will join them for dinner every day, irritating Maya further.
6	"The Hero and the Big Sister"; Transliteration: "Yūsha-sama to Onee-sama" (Japanese: 勇者さまとお姉さま)	Nobuharu Kamanaka	Toshihisa Kio	Nobuharu Kamanaka	May 13, 2023
Asahi encounters a rude group of adventurers that includes healer priestess Sophie, a kind girl who believes it is her duty to serve the next Hero. The next day Sophie’s party disappears in a dungeon. Asahi volunteers to find them and arrives in time for Maya to rescue them from monsters. Half unconscious Sophie only sees Asahi and becomes convinced he is the Hero. She offers to join Asahi as his healer but her previous party are furious and try blaming her for their mission going badly. Sophie instantly reveals her formidable temper, pointing out it was actually their fault due to poor leadership, poor magic ability and lack of skills. This causes a fight that Maya must secretly rescue Asahi from. Asahi realizes Sophie is an unintentional troublemaker and is practically useless and decides to avoid her. Later, with Maya fighting Kilmaria again, Asahi accepts a honey gathering quest but is found by Sophie who joins him. He manages to hide his weakness fighting bee monsters, but Sophie causes trouble by luring the giant Queen for him to fight. Fortunately the Queen is killed by debris from Maya and Kilmaria’s fight, though Sophie naively believes it was Asahi using Earth Magic.
7	"Portrait of a Certain Big Sister and Little Brother"; Transliteration: "Aru Kyōdai-tachi no Shōzō" (Japanese: 或る姉弟達の肖像)	Ayumi Iemura	Toshihisa Kio	Ayumi Iemura	May 20, 2023
Asahi is sent on an emergency quest to slay Stelopeth the Cyclops and his army, sent by Kilmaria’s co-worker General Giganto. Maya slays Stelopeth but Asahi is hypnotised by golems that regress his mind to a child’s. Maya is thrilled as child Asahi openly adores her, but he returns to normal when she accidentally hits his head. Maya threatens the golems into hypnotising him again. Stelopeth’s brother Brondeth arrives for revenge but is also killed, as are the golems caught in the explosion, so when Asahi hits his head again he returns to normal permanently. The next day Asahi encounters Tanya with her little brother Roy who wants to be an adventurer and is a fan of Asahi. Tanya requires a guard to the next town and drags Asahi along, who panics due to Maya’s absence. On the road a wyvern attacks so Asahi is forced to defend them and throws a stone in its mouth just as it breathes fire, luckily causing the wyvern to explode, surprising him and earning admiration from Tanya and Roy. As they leave the wyvern was revealed to have been secretly defeated by Maya with an invisible long range attack to boost Asahi’s self-confidence.
8	"I Can't Raise My Sword Against a Girl"; Transliteration: "Onnanoko ni Ken wa Furenai yo" (Japanese: 女の子に剣は振れないよ)	Yoshitsugu Kimura; Taichi Atarashi	Tsuna Harima	Haru Shinomiya	May 27, 2023
Asahi reaches level 20 and unlocks Light magic, though it only acts like a small torch. Their next quest is to capture the criminal Lombert and his gang Dark Crisis. Maya and Kilmaria defeat the criminals but Lombert challenges Asahi to duel just as troublemaking Sophie arrives with townspeople eager to see Asahi fight. Fortunately, Asahi defeats Lombert, albeit with secret help from Maya. Elsewhere noble adventurer Gloria Brigandine and her maid Kuon are suspicious how fast Asahi reached Ogre level. Meanwhile, Asahi has been tricked into an orc slaying quest without Maya, but is rescued by Gloria, who accuses Asahi of obtaining Ogre rank fraudulently and being a fraud. A distant Maya sends an invisible attack at Gloria, making Asahi seem powerful. This backfires when, due to exposing her panties, Gloria demands an official duel in the arena. Kuon suspiciously watches Maya and Kilmaria, preventing them from helping. Asahi can only dodge Gloria, but notices she is still wary of his powerful attack, though it really came from Maya. When she hesitates, he is able to blind her with Light and disarm her. Gloria is furious he won without attacking, but when Asahi claims he would never attack a woman she develops a crush on him and flees in embarrassment.
9	"The Preferred Form of a Big Sister"; Transliteration: "Ane to Shite no Kakkō o" (Japanese: 姉としての格好を)	Yūichi Abe	Tsuna Harima	Yūichi Abe	June 3, 2023
Asahi tries to go on a flower gathering quest, but Sophie insists on joining them. Asahi sends Sophie to search with Maya so he can search alone. He is attacked by goblins then rescued by Kilmaria who had been following him from a desire to be close to him. They stumble across Malvekanth the necromancer, servant of General Woodvoss, attacking a village. Malvekanth mistakenly believes Kilmaria is there to help him kill humans. Kilmaria, worried what Asahi thinks of her, kills Malvekanth instead. After returning the flower to the guild Asahi is unwillingly credited with Malvekanth’s defeat, putting him in line for promotion to Golem class. Gloria claims to still doubt his abilities and drags him on a quest to locate missing adventurers. Her clumsy attempts at romance cause Asahi injuries, so he ends up having casual conversation with Kuon, infuriating Gloria. After locating the monster responsible for the missing adventurers Gloria accidentally destroys it by herself after her panties are exposed to Asahi again. She returns home, having failed to measure his skills or ask him on a date. Asahi returns home and finds Maya and Kilmaria making the house a mess fighting again.
10	"My Amazing Little Brother"; Transliteration: "Watashi no, Saikō no Otōto" (Japanese: 私の、最高の弟)	Mashami Watanabe	Yōhei Kashii	Masayoshi Nishida	June 10, 2023
Following an argument with her father, Gloria enlists Kuon and Asahi’s assistance in moving out of her father's mansion into her father's villa (for nobles this counts as running away). Butler Sebastien, convinced Asahi is to blame, hires Dragon level adventurer Tigga to beat up Asahi, but they are scared away by Maya. Gloria suggests forming a clan, a collection of small parties into one large group. Kuon points out Gloria’s sheltered upbringing has left her with no real friends. Asahi points out Kuon counts as a friend, causing Kuon to develop a crush on him as well. Maya agrees they should form a clan to give Asahi a broader social life. On their next mission, Asahi is turned to stone by a basilisk. Unbeknownst to the girls, Asahi is fully conscious. This means he feels everything when Maya gropes him and sees absolutely everything when the girls, for some reason, take him into the bath with them. Kilmaria returns home just as Maya is about to kiss him and cures his petrification in time. When Maya realizes Asahi was conscious and saw her fully nude, she feels an unexpected rush of maidenly embarrassment for the first time. Later, Asahi officially registers their clan, but is tricked by Maya into naming it the Super Asahi Legion.
11	"Shark from Another World"; Transliteration: "Isekai Shāku" (Japanese: 異世界シャーク)	Shirō Izumi	Chabō Higurashi	Yūya Horiuchi	June 17, 2023
Tanya sends Asahi to exterminate shark monsters infesting a popular beach resort. The girls, plus Tanya, all accompany him but Gloria hunts the sharks in minutes, leaving the girls plenty of time to visit the beach, and show Asahi their bikinis. Maya punishes Kilmaria for wearing a bikini of strategically placed seashells. Kuon announces a beach competition, the winner getting Asahi to do one thing of their choosing, making Asahi nervous. After an intense contest of volleyball, capture the flag and watermelon smashing, Maya wins. More sharks appear led by the Sea Kings Greatest, ten monster sharks of various magical species. The girls defeat them, but Asahi and Maya are swept into the sea, ending up on a deserted island. Alone for the first time in months, Asahi and Maya enjoy the temporary solitude and rekindle their sibling bond, but Maya soon returns to groping him. Sea King himself appears but is killed by Maya for interrupting her alone time with Asahi. The other girls appear, revealing they were there the whole time and heard every embarrassing thing Asahi said to Maya. Returning home from the sunny island, Asahi is disappointed to find the town deluged by rainstorms.
12	"Big Sister Forever"; Transliteration: "Ane Fōebā" (Japanese: 姉フォーエバー)	Hiroaki Takagi; Kiyotaka Takezawa	Yōhei Kashii	Hiroaki Takagi; Kiyotaka Takezawa	June 24, 2023
Asahi is attacked by tentacles rising from the ground and determines a slime, bloated from the rain, has grown large enough to cover the entire town. Tanya identifies it as a Great Slime Flood, a rare slime that only attacks when commanded by a powerful master. Asahi focuses on evacuation assisted by Siegfried and his former party. Many adventurers decide to just leave but are brow beaten into staying by Sophie’s temper. Maya and Kilmaria locate Guriligula the Witch of Control, who sent the slime to disrupt the adventurer’s defences. Guriligula assumes Kilmaria is there to assist her and attacks Maya, only to be blown away by attacks from Kilmaria, then a bigger attack from Maya. Kuon locates the slimes core, which protects itself atop a tentacle 50 yards high. Gloria throws Asahi into the air and he destroys the core with his improved stone throwing. Asahi is hailed a hero, though it is revealed Maya secretly weakened the slime first by draining its water into the sinkhole made when the unconscious Guriligula hit the ground. Asahi is promoted to Golem class. The girls decide he deserves a kiss as a reward, but argue over which one gets to kiss him. Asahi refuses their reward and runs off outside, where he talks with Maya and thanks her for being there for him. The girls tell Asahi that Gloria is crying for refusing to kiss her and scold him for it. As he gets irritated by this, Asahi is just happy he gets to keep adventuring with his sister and friends.

== See also ==
- Ane Log, another manga series written and illustrated by Kenji Taguchi
