= 2021 in anime =

Events in 2021 in anime.

== Releases ==
=== Films ===
A list of anime films that were released in theaters between January 1 and December 31, 2021.

| Release date | Title | Studio | Director(s) | Running time (minutes) | Ref |
|---|---|---|---|---|---|
| January 1 | Seitokai Yakuindomo: The Movie 2 | GoHands | Hiromitsu Kanazawa | 80 | |
| January 8 | Gintama: The Final | Bandai Namco Pictures | Chizuru Miyawaki | 104 | |
| January 8 | Sailor Moon Eternal (part 1) | Toei Animation; Studio Deen | Chiaki Kon | 80 | |
| January 16 | Natsume's Book of Friends: The Waking Rock and the Strange Visitor | Shuka | Takahiro Omori (Chief); Hideki Itō | 51 | |
| February 11 | Princess Principal: Crown Handler – Chapter 1 | Actas | Masaki Tachibana | 53 | |
| February 11 | Sailor Moon Eternal (part 2) | Toei Animation; Studio Deen | Chiaki Kon | 80 | |
| February 26 | Tokyo 7th Sisters Movie: Bokura wa Aozora ni Naru | LandQ Studios | Takayuki Kitagawa | 77 | |
| March 5 | Aria the Crepuscolo | J.C.Staff | Junichi Sato (Chief); Takahiro Natori | 60 | |
| March 8 | Evangelion: 3.0+1.0 Thrice Upon a Time | Studio Khara | Katsuichi Nakayama; Kazuya Tsurumaki; Mahiro Maeda | 155 | |
| March 12 | Shimajiro to Sora Tobufune | Benesse Corporation | Tomohiro Kawamura | 59 | |
| March 26 | Girls und Panzer das Finale: Part 3 | Actas | Tsutomu Mizushima | 48 | |
| April 16 | Detective Conan: The Scarlet Bullet | TMS/V1Studio | Tomoka Nagaoka | 110 | |
| April 23 | BanG Dream! Episode of Roselia: Yakusoku | Sanzigen | Kōdai Kakimoto (Chief); Atsushi Mimura | 77 | |
| May 15 | Fate/Grand Order: Camelot - Paladin; Agaterám | Production I.G | Kazuto Arai | 96 | |
| June 4 | Knights of Sidonia: Love Woven in the Stars | Polygon Pictures | Hiroyuki Seshita (Chief); Tadahiro Yoshihira | 110 | |
| June 4 | Pompo: The Cinéphile | CLAP | Takayuki Hirao | 90 | |
| June 4 | Revue Starlight the Movie | Kinema Citrus | Tomohiro Furukawa | 120 | |
| June 11 | Fortune Favors Lady Nikuko | Studio 4°C | Ayumu Watanabe | 120 | |
| June 11 | Mobile Suit Gundam: Hathaway's Flash (part 1) | Sunrise | Shūkō Murase | 95 | |
| June 11 | Farewell, My Dear Cramer: First Touch | Liden Films | Seiki Takuno | 104 | |
| June 25 | BanG Dream! Episode of Roselia: Song I am. | Sanzigen | Kōdai Kakimoto (Chief); Atsushi Mimura | 70 | |
| July 2 | The Seven Deadly Sins: Cursed by Light | Studio Deen | Takayuki Hamana | 79 | |
| July 9 | Kakushigoto | Ajia-do Animation Works | Yūta Murano | 78 | |
| July 16 | Belle | Studio Chizu | Mamoru Hosoda | 122 | |
| July 16 | Kud Wafter | J.C.Staff | Kentarō Suzuki | 40 | |
| July 22 | Words Bubble Up Like Soda Pop | Signal.MD; Sublimation | Kyōhei Ishiguro | 90 | |
| July 24 | The Adventures on the Magic Island of Qiaohu | Benesse Corporation | | 120 | |
| July 30 | Crayon Shin-chan: Shrouded in Mystery! The Flowers of Tenkazu Academy | Shin-Ei Animation | Wataru Takahashi | 112 | |
| July 30 | Fate/Grand Order Final Singularity - Grand Temple of Time: Solomon | CloverWorks | Toshifumi Akai | 94 | |
| August 6 | My Hero Academia: World Heroes' Mission | Bones | Kenji Nagasaki | 104 | |
| August 20 | BanG Dream! Film Live 2nd Stage | Sanzigen | Tomomi Umetsu | 84 | |
| August 20 | Kin-iro Mosaic: Thank You!! | Studio Gokumi; AXsiZ | Munenori Nawa | 82 | |
| August 27 | Fate/kaleid liner Prisma Illya: Licht - The Nameless Girl | Silver Link | Shin Oonuma | 95 | |
| August 27 | The House of the Lost on the Cape | David Production | Shinya Kawatsura | 100 | |
| September 9 | Inu-Oh | Science SARU | Masaaki Yuasa | 98 | |
| September 17 | Free! The Final Stroke (part 1) | Kyoto Animation | Eisaku Kawakami | 90 | |
| September 23 | Princess Principal: Crown Handler – Chapter 2 | Actas | Masaki Tachibana | 56 | |
| October 8 | Child of Kamiari Month | Liden Films | Takana Shirai | 99 | |
| October 8 | Macross Delta the Movie: Absolute Live!!!!!! | Satelight | Shōji Kawamori | 124 | |
| October 8 | Star Blazers: Space Battleship Yamato 2205: Zensho -TAKE OFF- | Satelight | Kenji Yasuda | 103 | |
| October 9 | Dakaichi: Spain Arc | CloverWorks | Naoyuki Tatsuwa | 78 | |
| October 12 | Bright: Samurai Soul | Arect | Kyōhei Ishiguro | 80 | |
| October 29 | Sing a Bit of Harmony | J.C.Staff | Yasuhiro Yoshiura | 108 | |
| October 30 | Sword Art Online Progressive: Aria of a Starless Night | A-1 Pictures | Ayako Kōno | 97 | |
| November 5 | Eiga Sumikko Gurashi: Aoi Tsukiyo no Mahō no Ko | Fanworks | Takahiro Omori | 65 | |
| November 12 | Ghost in the Shell: SAC_2045 Sustainable War | Production I.G; Sola Digital Arts | Kenji Kamiyama (Chief); Shinji Aramaki (Chief); Michihito Fujii | 118 | |
| November 12 | Summer Ghost | Flat Studio | loundraw | 40 | |
| November 19 | Gekijōban Argonavis: Ryūsei no Obligato | Sanzigen | Shigeru Morikawa | 89 | |
| November 26 | Eureka - Eureka Seven: Hi-Evolution | Bones | Tomoki Kyoda | 116 | |
| December 3 | Aria the Benedizione | J.C.Staff | Junichi Sato (Chief); Takahiro Natori | 60 | |
| December 3 | Hula Fulla Dance | Bandai Namco Pictures | Seiji Mizushima (Chief); Shinya Watada | 109 | |
| December 10 | My Tyrano: Together, Forever | Tezuka Productions | Kōbun Shizuno | 108 | |
| December 24 | Jujutsu Kaisen 0 | MAPPA | Sunghoo Park | 105 | |
| December 31 | Sorairo Utility | Yostar Pictures | Kengo Saitō | 14 | |
| December 31 | The Irregular at Magic High School: Reminiscence Arc | Eight Bit | Risako Yoshida | 71 | |

=== Television series ===
A list of anime television series that debuted between January 1 and December 31, 2021.

| First run start and end dates | Title | Episodes | Studio | Director(s) | Original title | Ref |
|---|---|---|---|---|---|---|
| January 4 – March 22 | Otherside Picnic | 12 | Liden Films; Felix Film | Takuya Satō | Ura Sekai Picnic | |
| January 4 – March 22 | Suppose a Kid from the Last Dungeon Boonies Moved to a Starter Town | 12 | Liden Films | migmi | Tatoeba Last Dungeon Mae no Mura no Shōnen ga Joban no Machi de Kurasu Yō na Monogatari | |
| January 5 – March 23 | Gekidol | 12 | Hoods Entertainment | Shigeru Ueda | | |
| January 5 – March 30 | Umamusume: Pretty Derby (season 2) | 13 | Studio Kai | Kei Oikawa | | |
| January 6 – March 24 | I-Chu: Halfway Through the Idol | 12 | Lay-duce | Hitoshi Nanba | | |
| January 6 – March 24 | Re:Zero − Starting Life in Another World (season 2, part 2) | 12 | White Fox | Masaharu Watanabe | Re:Zero kara Hajimeru Isekai Seikatsu | |
| January 7 – March 25 | Beastars (season 2) | 12 | Orange | Shin'ichi Matsumi | | |
| January 7 – March 25 | Heaven's Design Team | 12 | Asahi Production | Sōichi Masui | Tenchi Sōzō Dezain-bu | |
| January 7 – March 25 | Hortensia Saga | 12 | Liden Films | Yasuto Nishikata | | |
| January 7 – April 1 | Laid-Back Camp: Season 2 | 13 | C-Station | Yoshiaki Kyogoku | Yuru Camp: Season 2 | |
| January 7 – March 25 | LBX Girls | 12 | Studio A-Cat | Keitaro Motonaga | Sōkō Musume Senki | |
| January 7 – March 25 | Show by Rock!! Stars!! | 12 | Kinema Citrus | Takahiro Ikezoe (Chief); Daigo Yamagishi | | |
| January 8 – March 26 | 2.43: Seiin High School Boys Volleyball Team | 12 | David Production | Yasuhiro Kimura | 2.43: Seiin Kōkō Danshi Volley-bu | |
| January 8 – March 26 | Bottom-tier Character Tomozaki | 12 | Project No.9 | Shinsuke Yanagi | Jaku-kyara Tomozaki-kun | |
| January 8 – March 12 | Idolls! | 10 | Shin-Ei Animation | Shōta Nakano | | |
| January 8 – July 3 | So I'm a Spider, So What? | 24 | Millepensee | Shin Itagaki | Kumo desu ga, Nani ka? | |
| January 8 – March 26 | The Promised Neverland (season 2) | 11 | CloverWorks | Mamoru Kanbe | Yakusoku no Neverland | |
| January 8 – March 26 | The Quintessential Quintuplets ∬ | 12 | Bibury Animation Studios | Kaori | Go-Tōbun no Hanayome | |
| January 9 – June 19 | Back Arrow | 24 | Studio VOLN | Gorō Taniguchi | | |
| January 9 – February 27 | Cells at Work!! | 8 | David Production | Hirofumi Ogura | Hataraku Saibō!! | |
| January 9 – April 3 | Project Scard: Scar on the Praeter | 13 | GoHands | Shingo Suzuki | | |
| January 9 – March 27 | The Hidden Dungeon Only I Can Enter | 12 | Okuruto Noboru | Kenta Ōnishi | Ore Dake Haireru Kakushi Danjon ~Kossori Kitaete Sekai Saikyō~ | |
| January 9 – March 27 | WIXOSS Diva(A)Live | 12 | J.C.Staff | Masato Matsune | | |
| January 10 – June 27 | Aikatsu Planet! | 25 | Bandai Namco Pictures | Ryūichi Kimura | Aikatsu Puranetto! | |
| January 10 – March 21 | Cells at Work! Code Black | 13 | Liden Films | Hideyo Yamamoto | Hataraku Saibō! Black | |
| January 10 – March 28 | Dr. Ramune: Mysterious Disease Specialist | 12 | Platinum Vision | Hideaki Ōba | Kaibyōi Ramune | |
| January 10 – April 4 | Horimiya | 13 | CloverWorks | Masashi Ishihama | | |
| January 10 – March 28 | Idoly Pride | 12 | Lerche | Yū Kinome | | |
| January 10 – March 28 | Kemono Jihen | 12 | Ajia-do Animation Works | Masaya Fujimori | | |
| January 10 – April 4 | SK8 the Infinity | 12 | Bones | Hiroko Utsumi | | |
| January 10 – March 28 | Skate-Leading Stars | 12 | J.C.Staff | Gorō Taniguchi (Chief); Toshinori Fukushima | | |
| January 10 – April 4 | World Trigger (season 2) | 12 | Toei Animation | Morio Hatano | | |
| January 10 – March 28 | Yatogame-chan Kansatsu Nikki (season 3) | 12 | Saetta | Hisayoshi Hirasawa | Yatogame-chan Kansatsu Nikki 3 Satsume | |
| January 11 – March 29 | Ex-Arm | 12 | Visual Flight | Yoshikatsu Kimura | | |
| January 11 – March 22 | Mushoku Tensei: Jobless Reincarnation (part 1) | 11 | Studio Bind | Manabu Okamoto | Mushoku Tensei: Isekai Ittara Honki Dasu | |
| January 11 – March 29 | Non Non Biyori Nonstop | 12 | Silver Link | Shinya Kawatsura | | |
| January 12 – March 30 | Azur Lane: Slow Ahead! | 12 | Candy Box; Yostar Pictures | Masato Jinbo | Azur Lane: Bisoku Zenshin! | |
| January 12 – March 30 | That Time I Got Reincarnated as a Slime (season 2, part 1) | 12 | Eight Bit | Atsushi Nakayama | Tensei Shitara Slime Datta Ken | |
| January 12 – March 30 | True Cooking Master Boy (season 2) | 12 | NAS | Itsuro Kawasaki | Shin Chūka Ichiban! | |
| January 13 – March 31 | Bungo Stray Dogs Wan! | 12 | Bones; Nomad | Satonobu Kikuchi | | |
| January 13 – March 31 | Log Horizon: Destruction of the Round Table | 12 | Studio Deen | Shinji Ishihira | Log Horizon: Entaku Hōkai | |
| January 13 – March 31 | Redo of Healer | 12 | TNK | Takuya Asaoka | Kaifuku Jutsushi no Yarinaoshi | |
| January 13 – June 23 | The Seven Deadly Sins: Dragon's Judgement | 24 | Studio Deen | Susumu Nishizawa | Nanatsu no Taizai: Fundo no Shinpan | |
| January 13 – June 30 | Wonder Egg Priority | 12 | CloverWorks | Shin Wakabayashi | | |
| January 13 – March 31 | World Witches Take Off! | 12 | acca effe Giga Production | Fumio Ito | World Witches Hasshin Shimasu! | |
| January 14 – March 25 | Dr. Stone: Stone Wars | 11 | TMS/8PAN | Shinya Iino | | |
| January 20 – March 31 | Sorcerous Stabber Orphen: Battle of Kimluck | 11 | Studio Deen | Takayuki Hamana | Majutsushi Orphen Haguretabi: Kimluck-hen | |
| February 5 – July 30 | D4DJ Petit Mix | 26 | DMM.futureworks; W-Toon Studio | Seiya Miyajima | | |
| February 25 – January 27, 2022 | Kiyo in Kyoto: From the Maiko House | 12 | J.C.Staff | Yōhei Suzuki | Maiko-san chi no Makanai-san | |
| February 28 – January 30, 2022 | Tropical-Rouge! Pretty Cure | 46 | Toei Animation | Yutaka Tsuchida | Toropikarūju! Purikyua | |
| March 27 – September 25 | My Hero Academia (season 5) | 25 | Bones | Kenji Nagasaki (Chief); Masahiro Mukai | Boku no Hero Academia 5 | |
| April 1 – June 24 | Godzilla Singular Point | 13 | Bones; Orange | Atsushi Takahashi | | |
| April 1 – April 21, 2022 | Shaman King | 52 | Bridge | Joji Furuta | | |
| April 2 – October 22 | Motto! Majime ni Fumajime Kaiketsu Zorori (season 2) | 25 | Ajia-do Animation Works; Bandai Namco Pictures | Takahide Ogata | | |
| April 2 – June 18 | SSSS.Dynazenon | 12 | Trigger | Akira Amemiya | | |
| April 3 – June 19 | Burning Kabaddi | 12 | TMS Entertainment | Kazuya Ichikawa | Shakunetsu Kabaddi | |
| April 3 – June 21 | Let's Make a Mug Too | 12 | Nippon Animation | Jun Kamiya | Yakunara Magu Kappu mo | |
| April 3 – March 26, 2022 | Sushi Sumo | 52 | Shirogumi | Yūta Sukegawa | Dosukoi Sushi-Zumō | |
| April 3 – June 19 | Those Snow White Notes | 12 | Shin-Ei Animation | Hiroaki Akagi | Mashiro no Oto | |
| April 3 – June 19 | Vivy: Fluorite Eye's Song | 13 | Wit Studio | Shinpei Ezaki | | |
| April 4 – June 20 | Combatants Will Be Dispatched! | 12 | J.C.Staff | Hiroaki Akagi | Sentōin, Hakenshimasu! | |
| April 4 – June 20 | Dragon Goes House-Hunting | 12 | Signal.MD | Haruki Kasugamori | Dragon, Ie o Kau. | |
| April 4 – June 27 | Farewell, My Dear Cramer | 13 | Liden Films | Seiki Takuno | Sayonara Watashi no Kuramā | |
| April 4 – | Mazica Party | | OLM | Shinji Ushiro | | |
| April 4 – June 27 | Megalobox 2: Nomad | 13 | TMS Entertainment | Yō Moriyama | | |
| April 4 – June 27 | Moriarty the Patriot (part 2) | 13 | Production I.G | Kazuya Nomura | Yūkoku no Moriarty | |
| April 5 – May 24 | I Became a Kuro-Gyaru, so I Fucked My Best Friend. | 8 | Irawiasu | Chokkō | Kuro-Gyaru ni Natta Kara Shinyū to Shite Mita. | |
| April 5 – June 28 | Higehiro | 13 | Project No.9 | Manabu Kamikita | Hige o Soru. Soshite Joshi Kōsei o Hirō. | |
| April 5 – June 21 | Koikimo | 12 | Nomad | Naomi Nakayama | Koi to Yobu ni wa Kimochi Warui | |
| April 5 – June 21 | Seven Knights Revolution: Hero Successor | 12 | Liden Films; DOMERICA | Kazuya Ichikawa | Seven Knights Revolution: Eiyū no Keishōsha | |
| April 6 – June 29 | Fruits Basket: The Final | 13 | TMS/8PAN | Yoshihide Ibata | | |
| April 6 – June 29 | Iii Icecrin | 12 | Shin-Ei Animation; TIA | Juria Matsumura | Ai Ai Ai Aisukurin | |
| April 6 – June 29 | Mars Red | 13 | Signal.MD | Kouhei Hatano | | |
| April 6 – June 29 | Odd Taxi | 13 | OLM; P.I.C.S. | Baku Kinoshita | | |
| April 6 – June 22 | The Saint's Magic Power is Omnipotent | 12 | Diomedéa | Shōta Ihata | Seijo no Maryoku wa Bannō Desu | |
| April 6 – June 22 | The Slime Diaries: That Time I Got Reincarnated as a Slime | 12 | Eight Bit | Yuji Ikuhara | Tensura Nikki Tensei Shitara Slime Datta Ken | |
| April 7 – June 23 | Full Dive | 12 | ENGI | Kazuya Miura | Kyūkyoku Shinka shita Full Dive RPG ga Genjitsu yori mo Kusoge Dattara | |
| April 7 – June 23 | Joran: The Princess of Snow and Blood | 12 | Bakken Record | Susumu Kudo | | |
| April 7 – June 23 | Super Cub | 12 | Studio Kai | Toshiro Fujii | | |
| April 8 – June 24 | Fairy Ranmaru | 12 | Studio Comet | Kōsuke Kobayashi; Masakazu Hishida | | |
| April 8 – June 24 | Zombie Land Saga Revenge | 12 | MAPPA | Munehisa Sakai | | |
| April 9 – June 25 | Backflip!! | 12 | Zexcs | Seishirō Nagaya; Toshimasa Kuroyanagi | Bakuten!! | |
| April 9 – June 11 | How Not to Summon a Demon Lord Ω | 10 | Tezuka Productions; Okuruto Noboru | Satoshi Kuwabara | Isekai Maō to Shōkan Shōjo no Dorei Majutsu Ω | |
| April 9 – March 18, 2022 | Shinkansen Henkei Robo Shinkalion Z | 41 | OLM | Takahiro Ikezoe (Chief); Kentarō Yamaguchi | Shinkansen Henkei Robo Shinkarion Zetto | |
| April 10 – September 25 | Blue Reflection Ray | 24 | J.C.Staff | Risako Yoshida | | |
| April 10 – June 26 | I've Been Killing Slimes for 300 Years and Maxed Out My Level | 12 | Revoroot | Nobukage Kimura | Suraimu Taoshite Sanbyaku-nen, Shiranai Uchi ni Reberu Makkusu ni Nattemashita | |
| April 10 – June 26 | The World Ends with You the Animation | 12 | DOMERICA; Shin-Ei Animation | Kazuya Ichikawa | Subarashiki Kono Sekai: The Animation | |
| April 10 – June 26 | Yuki Yuna is a Hero: Churutto! | 12 | DMM.futureworks; W-Toon Studio | Seiya Miyajima | | |
| April 11 – June 20 | 86 (part 1) | 11 | A-1 Pictures | Toshimasa Ishii | | |
| April 11 – June 27 | Battle Athletes Victory ReSTART! | 12 | Seven | Tokihiro Sasaki | Battle Athletes Daiundōkai ReSTART! | |
| April 11 – June 27 | Don't Toy with Me, Miss Nagatoro | 12 | Telecom Animation Film | Hirokazu Hanai | Ijiranaide, Nagatoro-san | |
| April 11 – October 3 | Edens Zero | 25 | J.C.Staff | Shinji Ishihira (Chief); Yūshi Suzuki | | |
| April 11 – March 27, 2022 | Mewkledreamy Mix! | 50 | J.C.Staff | Hiroaki Sakurai | | |
| April 11 – June 27 | Pretty Boy Detective Club | 12 | Shaft | Akiyuki Shinbo (Chief); Hajime Ootani | Bishōnen Tanteidan | |
| April 11 – July 4 | Shadows House | 13 | CloverWorks | Kazuki Ohashi | | |
| April 11 – September 19 | Tokyo Revengers | 24 | Liden Films | Koichi Hatsumi | | |
| April 12 – June 28 | Gloomy the Naughty Grizzly | 12 | NAZ | Takehiro Kubota | Itazuraguma no Gloomy | |
| April 12 – August 30 | To Your Eternity | 20 | Brain's Base | Masahiko Murata | Fumetsu no Anata e | |
| April 14 – June 30 | Osamake | 12 | Doga Kobo | Takashi Naoya | Osananajimi ga Zettai ni Makenai Love Comedy | |
| April 15 – June 24 | Cestvs: The Roman Fighter | 11 | Bandai Namco Pictures; Logic&Magic | Toshifumi Kawase (Chief); Kazuya Monma | | |
| April 17 – September 11 | Welcome to Demon School! Iruma-kun (season 2) | 21 | Bandai Namco Pictures | Makoto Moriwaki | Mairimashita! Iruma-kun | |
| July 1 – September 30 | Higurashi: When They Cry – Sotsu | 15 | Passione | Keiichiro Kawaguchi | Higurashi no Naku Koro ni Sotsu | |
| July 1 – September 16 | Peach Boy Riverside | 12 | Asahi Production | Shigeru Ueda | | |
| July 1 – December 23 | Scarlet Nexus | 26 | Sunrise | Hiroyuki Nishimura | | |
| July 3 – September 18 | Girlfriend, Girlfriend | 12 | Tezuka Productions | Satoshi Kuwabara | Kanojo mo Kanojo | |
| July 3 – September 18 | My Next Life as a Villainess: All Routes Lead to Doom! X | 12 | Silver Link | Keisuke Inoue | Otome Gēmu no Hametsu Furagu Shika Nai Akuyaku Reijō ni Tensei Shite Shimatta... X | |
| July 3 – September 18 | Ore, Tsushima | 12 | Fanworks; Space Neko Company | Jun Aoki | | |
| July 3 – September 25 | Remake Our Life! | 12 | Feel | Tomoki Kobayashi | Bokutachi no Rimeiku | |
| July 3 – September 18 | The Case Study of Vanitas (part 1) | 12 | Bones | Tomoyuki Itamura | Vanitasu no Karute | |
| July 3 – September 25 | The Honor Student at Magic High School | 13 | Connect | Hideki Tachibana | Mahōka Kōkō no Yūtōsei | |
| July 4 – September 26 | Getter Robo Arc | 13 | Bee Media; Studio A-Cat | Jun Kawagoe | | |
| July 4 – September 26 | How a Realist Hero Rebuilt the Kingdom (part 1) | 13 | J.C.Staff | Takashi Watanabe | Genjitsushugi Yūsha no Ōkoku Saikenki | |
| July 4 – September 26 | Idolish7: Third Beat! (part 1) | 13 | Troyca | Makoto Bessho | | |
| July 4 – September 26 | Kageki Shojo!! | 13 | Pine Jam | Kazuhiro Yoneda | | |
| July 4 – October 3 | Re-Main | 12 | MAPPA | Masafumi Nishida (Chief); Kiyoshi Matsuda | | |
| July 4 – September 19 | The Detective Is Already Dead | 12 | ENGI | Manabu Kurihara | Tantei wa Mō, Shinde Iru. | |
| July 4 – September 19 | The Duke of Death and His Maid | 12 | J.C.Staff | Yoshinobu Yamakawa | Shinigami Bocchan to Kuro Maid | |
| July 5 – August 23 | Fire in His Fingertips 2: My Boyfriend is a Firefighter | 8 | Studio Hōkiboshi | Toshihiro Watase | Yubisaki Kara Honki no Netsujō Tsū-Koibito wa Shōbōshi- | |
| July 6 – September 28 | Life Lessons with Uramichi Oniisan | 13 | Studio Blanc | Nobuyoshi Nagayama | Uramichi Oniisan | |
| July 6 – September 21 | Seirei Gensouki: Spirit Chronicles | 12 | TMS Entertainment | Osamu Yamasaki | | |
| July 6 – September 21 | That Time I Got Reincarnated as a Slime (season 2, part 2) | 12 | Eight Bit | Atsushi Nakayama | Tensei Shitara Slime Datta Ken | |
| July 7 – September 22 | Drugstore in Another World | 12 | EMT Squared | Masafumi Satō | Cheat Kusushi no Slow Life - Isekai ni Tsukurō Drugstore | |
| July 7 – September 22 | Tsukimichi: Moonlit Fantasy | 12 | C2C | Shinji Ishihira | Tsuki ga Michibiku Isekai Dōchū | |
| July 7 – December 29 | Tsukipro the Animation (season 2) | 13 | PRA | Shigeru Kimiya | | |
| July 8 – September 23 | Miss Kobayashi's Dragon Maid S | 12 | Kyoto Animation | Tatsuya Ishihara; Yasuhiro Takemoto | Kobayashi-san Chi no Meidoragon S | |
| July 9 – December 17 | The Aquatope on White Sand | 24 | P.A. Works | Toshiya Shinohara | Shiroi Suna no Akuatōpu | |
| July 9 – September 24 | The Dungeon of Black Company | 12 | Silver Link | Mirai Minato | Meikyū Burakku Kanpanī | |
| July 10 – October 2 | D_Cide Traumerei the Animation | 13 | Sanzigen | Yoshikazu Kon | | |
| July 10 – September 25 | I'm Standing on a Million Lives (season 2) | 12 | Maho Film | Kumiko Habara | 100-Man no Inochi no Ue ni Ore wa Tatteiru | |
| July 11 – October 17 | Love Live! Superstar!! | 12 | Sunrise | Takahiko Kyogoku | | |
| July 13 – September 28 | Battle Game in 5 Seconds | 12 | SynergySP; Vega Entertainment | Meigo Naito (Chief); Nobuyoshi Arai | Deatte 5-byō de Batoru | |
| July 14 – September 15 | Mother of the Goddess' Dormitory | 10 | Asread | Shunsuke Nakashige | Megami-ryō no Ryōbo-kun | |
| July 15 – September 30 | Night Head 2041 | 12 | Shirogumi | Takamitsu Hirakawa | | |
| July 16 – October 1 | Sonny Boy | 12 | Madhouse | Shingo Natsume | | |
| July 23 – October 1 | The Idaten Deities Know Only Peace | 11 | MAPPA | Seimei Kidokoro | Heion Sedai no Idaten-tachi | |
| August 1 – September 26 | Magia Record: Puella Magi Madoka Magica Side Story - Eve of Awakening | 8 | Shaft | Gekidan Inu Curry (Doroinu) (Chief); Yukihiro Miyamoto | Magia Record: Mahō Shōjo Madoka Magika Gaiden - Kakusei Zenya | |
| August 1 – December 19 | The Great Jahy Will Not Be Defeated! | 20 | Silver Link | Mirai Minato | Jahī-sama wa Kujikenai! | |
| August 15 – October 24 | Fena: Pirate Princess | 12 | Production I.G | ToyGerPROJECT; Kazuto Nakazawa; Tetsuya Takahashi; Saki Fujii | Kaizoku Ōjo | |
| October 1 – November 26 | Everything for Demon King Evelogia | 9 | Studio Hōkiboshi | Sanae Nagi | Maō Evelogia ni Mi o Sasage yo | |
| October 1 – December 17 | Kimi to Fit Boxing | 12 | Imagineer; Story Effect | Junpei Morita | | |
| October 1 – December 24 | Megaton Musashi | 13 | OLM | Akihiro Hino (Chief); Shigeharu Takahashi | | |
| October 1 – December 24 | Selection Project | 13 | Doga Kobo | Daisuke Hiramaki | | |
| October 2 – December 18 | Blue Period | 12 | Seven Arcs | Koji Masunari (Chief); Katsuya Asano | | |
| October 2 – December 18 | "Deji" Meets Girl | 12 | Liden Films | Ushio Tazawa | | |
| October 2 – December 18 | Let's Make a Mug Too: Second Kiln | 12 | Nippon Animation | Jun Kamiya | Yakunara Mug Cup Mo Niban Kamo | |
| October 2 – December 18 | Restaurant to Another World (season 2) | 12 | OLM | Masato Jinbo | Isekai Shokudō | |
| October 2 – January 2, 2022 (Note: Episode 24 of Yashahime: Princess Half-Demon was originally scheduled to air on Adult Swim on the broadcast night of December 11–12, 2021, but episode 21 was mistakenly reaired in its place.) | Yashahime: Princess Half-Demon - The Second Act | 24 | Sunrise | Masakazu Hishida | Hanyō no Yashahime: Ni no Shō | |
| October 2 – December 18 | Yuki Yuna is a Hero: The Great Mankai Chapter | 12 | Studio Gokumi | Seiji Kishi | Yūki Yūna wa Yūsha de Aru: Dai-Mankai no Shō | |
| October 3 – March 19, 2022 | 86 (part 2) | 12 | A-1 Pictures | Toshimasa Ishii | | |
| October 3 – March 26, 2023 | Digimon Ghost Game | 67 | Toei Animation | Kimitoshi Chioka; Masato Mitsuka | (Dejimon Gōsuto Gēmu) | |
| October 3 – December 19 | Mieruko-chan | 12 | Passione | Yuki Ogawa | | |
| October 3 – December 19 | Muteking the Dancing Hero | 12 | Tatsunoko Production; Tezuka Productions | Ryōsuke Takahashi (Chief); Yūzō Satō | | |
| October 3 – December 26 | Tesla Note | 13 | Gambit | Michio Fukuda | | |
| October 3 – December 19 | The Night Beyond the Tricornered Window | 12 | Zero-G | Daiji Iwanaga (Chief); Yoshitaka Yasuda | Sankaku Mado no Sotogawa wa Yoru | |
| October 3 – | Waccha PriMagi! | | Tatsunoko Production; Dongwoo A&E | Junichi Sato (Chief); Kōsuke Kobayashi | | |
| October 4 – December 20 | Irina: The Vampire Cosmonaut | 12 | Arvo Animation | Akitoshi Yokoyama | Tsuki to Laika to Nosferatu | |
| October 4 – December 20 | Mushoku Tensei: Jobless Reincarnation (part 2) | 12 | Studio Bind | Manabu Okamoto | Mushoku Tensei: Isekai Ittara Honki Dasu | |
| October 4 – December 20 | The Vampire Dies in No Time | 12 | Madhouse | Hiroshi Kōjina | Kyūketsuki Sugu Shinu | |
| October 5 – December 28 | Amaim Warrior at the Borderline (part 1) | 13 | Sunrise Beyond | Nobuyoshi Habara | Kyōkai Senki | |
| October 5 – March 29, 2022 | Chickip Dancers | 26 | Fanworks | Rareko | | |
| October 5 – December 21 | The Fruit of Evolution | 12 | Hotline | Yoshiaki Okumura | Shinka no Mi: Shiranai Uchi ni Kachigumi Jinsei | |
| October 6 – December 29 | Banished from the Hero's Party | 13 | Wolfsbane; Studio Flad | Makoto Hoshino | Shin no Nakama janai to Yūsha no Party o Oidasareta node, Henkyō de Slow Life Suru Koto ni Shimashita | |
| October 6 – December 22 | PuraOre! Pride of Orange | 12 | C2C | Takebumi Anzai | | |
| October 6 – December 22 | Takt Op. Destiny | 12 | MAPPA; Madhouse | Yuuki Itoh | (Takuto Ōpasu) | |
| October 6 – December 22 | The World's Finest Assassin Gets Reincarnated in Another World as an Aristocrat | 12 | Silver Link; Studio Palette | Masafumi Tamura | Sekai Saikō no Ansatsusha, Isekai Kizoku ni Tensei suru | |
| October 7 – December 23 | Komi Can't Communicate (season 1) | 12 | OLM | Ayumu Watanabe (Chief); Kazuki Kawagoe | Komi-san wa, Komyushō desu | |
| October 7 – December 23 | Muv-Luv Alternative | 12 | Yumeta Company; Graphinica | Yukio Nishimoto | | |
| October 7 – December 23 | Sakugan | 12 | Satelight | Jun'ichi Wada | | |
| October 8 – March 25, 2022 | Platinum End | 24 | Signal.MD | Hideya Takahashi; Kazuchika Kise | | |
| October 8 – March 18, 2022 | World's End Harem | 11 | Studio Gokumi; AXsiZ | Yuu Nobuta | Shūmatsu no Harem | |
| October 9 – December 25 | Taisho Otome Fairy Tale | 12 | SynergySP | Jun Hatori | Taishō Otome Otogi Banashi | |
| October 9 – January 3, 2022 | The Faraway Paladin | 12 | Children's Playground Entertainment | Yuu Nobuta | Saihate no Paladin | |
| October 9 – December 25 | Visual Prison | 12 | A-1 Pictures | Takeshi Furuta (Chief); Tomoya Tanaka | | |
| October 10 – January 23, 2022 | World Trigger (season 3) | 14 | Toei Animation | Morio Hatano | | |
| October 10 – December 26 | Build Divide -#00000 (Code Black)- (part 1) | 12 | Liden Films | Yuki Komada | | |
| October 10 – November 28 | Demon Slayer: Kimetsu no Yaiba – Mugen Train Arc | 7 | Ufotable | Haruo Sotozaki | Kimetsu no Yaiba: Mugen Ressha-hen | |
| October 10 – March 27, 2022 | Lupin the 3rd Part 6 | 24 | TMS Entertainment | Eiji Suganuma | | |
| October 10 – December 26 | My Senpai Is Annoying | 12 | Doga Kobo | Ryota Itoh | Senpai ga Uzai Kōhai no Hanashi | |
| October 10 – December 26 | Shikizakura | 12 | Sublimation | Shinya Sugai (Chief); Gō Kurosaki | | |
| October 11 – December 27 | Ancient Girl's Frame | 12 | Seven Stone | Gong Zhenhua (Chief) | Tōshinki Jīzu Furēmu | |
| October 11 – December 27 | Rumble Garanndoll | 12 | Lerche | Masaomi Andō | Gyakuten Sekai no Denchi Shōjo | |
| October 13 – December 29 | Deep Insanity: The Lost Child | 12 | Silver Link | Shin Oonuma | | |
| October 13 – December 29 | Kaginado | 12 | Liden Films Kyoto Studio | Kazuya Sakamoto | | |
| October 15 – December 31 | 180-Byō de Kimi no Mimi o Shiawase ni Dekiru ka? | 12 | Ekachi Epilka; Indivision | Yoshinobu Kasai | | |
| October 15 – March 25, 2022 | Ranking of Kings | 23 | Wit Studio | Yōsuke Hatta | Ōsama Ranking | |
| November 14 – February 6, 2022 | Blade Runner: Black Lotus | 13 | Sola Digital Arts | Shinji Aramaki; Kenji Kamiyama | | |
| December 4 – | Detective Conan: Police Academy Arc | | TMS Entertainment | | Meitantei Conan Keisatsu Gakkō-hen Wairudo Porisu Sutōrī | |
| December 5 – February 13, 2022 | Demon Slayer: Kimetsu no Yaiba – Entertainment District Arc | 11 | Ufotable | Haruo Sotozaki | Kimetsu no Yaiba: Yūkaku-hen | |
| December 6 – December 17 | Kanashiki Debu Neko-chan | 10 | Cyclone Graphics | Michiya Katō | | |

=== Original net animations ===
A list of original net animations that debuted between January 1 and December 31, 2021.

| First run start and end dates | Title | Episodes | Studio | Director(s) | Original title | Ref |
|---|---|---|---|---|---|---|
| January 1 | Cute Executive Officer | 13 | Project No.9 | Kazuya Iwata | Yōjo Shachō | |
| January 2 – March 20 | Armor Shop for Ladies & Gentlemen (season 2) | 12 | IMAGICA Lab | Junichi Yamamoto | Otona no Bōguya-san | |
| February 14 – March 14 | Vlad Love | 12 | Drive | Mamoru Oshii (Chief); Junji Nishimura | | |
| February 25 | High-Rise Invasion | 12 | Zero-G | Masahiro Takata | Tenkū Shinpan | |
| March 4 | Pacific Rim: The Black | 7 | Polygon Pictures | Hiroyuki Hayashi; Jae-hong Kim | Pacific Rim: Ankoku no Tairiku | |
| March 7 | Oshiete Hokusai!: The Animation | 10 | CoMix Wave Films | Naoto Iwakiri | | |
| March 18 | B: The Beginning Succession | 6 | Production I.G | Kazuto Nakazawa (Chief); Itsuro Kawasaki | | |
| March 20 – April 3 | Powerful Pro Yakyū Powerful Kōkō-hen | 4 | CloverWorks | Tetsuaki Watanabe | | |
| April 1 – June 17 | Hetalia: World Stars | 12 | Studio Deen | Hiroshi Watanabe | | |
| April 2 – March 18, 2022 | Beyblade Burst QuadDrive | 52 | OLM | Jin Gu Oh | Beiburēdo Bāsuto Dainamaito Batoru | |
| April 8 | The Way of the Househusband (part 1) | 5 | J.C.Staff | Chiaki Kon | Gokushufudō | |
| April 16 – September 12 | Night World | 3 | Studio Daisy | Ryōsuke Sawa | Yoru no Kuni | |
| April 29 | Yasuke | 6 | MAPPA | Takeshi Satou (Chief); LeSean Thomas | | |
| April 30 – | Ningen Kaishūsha | | | | | |
| May 25 | Etotama | 1 | Shirogumi; Encourage Films | Fumitoshi Oizaki | | |
| May 27 | Eden | 4 | Qubic Pictures; CGCG Studio Inc. | Yasuhiro Irie | | |
| May 28 – September 10 | Artiswitch | 6 | Sunrise | Kazuma Ikeda | | |
| June 17 | Record of Ragnarok | 12 | Graphinica | Masao Ōkubo | Shūmatsu no Valkyrie | |
| July 8 | Resident Evil: Infinite Darkness | 4 | TMS Entertainment; Quebico | Eiichirō Hasumi | | |
| July 20 – January 4, 2022 | Assault Lily Fruits | 13 | Shaft | Shouji Saeki | | |
| September 9 – December 23 | Pokémon Evolutions | 8 | OLM | Daiki Tomiyasu | | |
| September 16 – November 25 | The Heike Story | 11 | Science SARU | Naoko Yamada | Heike Monogatari | |
| September 20 – December 6 | Ganbare Doukichan | 12 | Atelier Pontdarc | Kazuomi Koga | | |
| September 20 – December 6 | Tawawa on Monday 2 | 12 | Yokohama Animation Laboratory | Yuki Ogawa | Getsuyōbi no Tawawa 2 | |
| September 22 | Star Wars: Visions | 9 | Geno Studio; Kamikaze Douga; Kinema Citrus; Production I.G; Science SARU; Studio Colorido; Studio Trigger | Yuki Igarashi; Takanobu Mizuno; Hitoshi Haga; Kenji Kamiyama; Eunyoung Choi; Abel Góngora; Taku Kimura; Hiroyuki Imaishi; Masahiko Otsuka | | |
| September 30 | Baki Hanma | 12 | TMS Entertainment | Toshiki Hirano | | |
| October 1 – | Rich Police Cash | | Sorajima Studio | Shoya Miki | Rich Kaikan Cash | |
| October 7 | The Way of the Househusband (part 2) | 5 | J.C.Staff | Chiaki Kon | Gokushufudō | |
| October 19 – November 23 | Gundam Breaker Battlogue | 6 | Sunrise | Masami Obari | | |
| November 25 | Super Crooks | 13 | Bones | Motonobu Hori | | |
| December 1 – December 1, 2022 | JoJo's Bizarre Adventure: Stone Ocean | 38 | David Production | Kenichi Suzuki (Chief); Toshiyuki Kato | JoJo no Kimyō na Bōken: Stone Ocean | |
| December 3 | Neko de Yokereba | 5 | Gonpi | hironovski | | |
| December 16 | Aggretsuko (season 4) | 10 | Fanworks | Rareko | | |
| December 20 – December 27 | Oni no Hanayome wa Taberaretai | 2 | Magia | | | |
| December 28 – | The Missing 8 | | Wit Studio | Naoki Yoshibe | | |

=== Original video animations ===
A list of original video animations that debuted between January 1 and December 31, 2021.

| First run start and end dates | Title | Episodes | Studio | Director(s) | Original title | Ref |
|---|---|---|---|---|---|---|
| January 20 | Planetarian: Snow Globe | 1 | Okuruto Noboru | Jin Tamamura | | |
| February 26 – October 14 | Wotakoi: Love Is Hard for Otaku | 2 | Lapin Track | Yayoi Takano | Wotaku ni Koi wa Muzukashii | |
| March 1 | Don't Stay Gold | 1 | Grizzly | Kaori Makita | Saezuru Tori wa Habatakanai | |
| March 3 | Alice in Deadly School | 1 | Hoods Entertainment | Shigeyasu Yamauchi | | |
| April 28 | Is It Wrong to Try to Pick Up Girls in a Dungeon? | 1 | J.C.Staff | Hideki Tachibana | Dungeon ni Deai o Motomeru no wa Machigatteiru Darō ka? | |
| May 19 | Kaguya-sama: Love Is War | 1 | A-1 Pictures | Mamoru Hatakeyama | Kaguya-sama wa Kokurasetai - Tensai-tachi no Ren'ai Zunōsen | |
| May 7 – June 2 | Bottom-tier Character Tomozaki | 2 | Project No.9 | Shinsuke Yanagi | Jaku-kyara Tomozaki-kun | |
| June 2 – October 13 | Fate/Grand Carnival | 2 | Lerche | Seiji Kishi | | |
| July 4 | Isekai Cheat Magician: Starry Night Festival | 1 | Encourage Films | Daisuke Tsukushi | Yoiboshi no Matsuri to Majutsushi | |
| July 28 | Laid-Back Camp: Traveling Rin Shima | 1 | C-Station | Yoshiaki Kyogoku | Yuru Camp: Tabi-suru Shima Rin | |
| August 18 | Fly Me to the Moon ~SNS~ | 1 | Seven Arcs | Hiroshi Ikehata | Tonikaku Kawaii ~SNS~ | |
| September 10 – September 10, 2022 | The Ancient Magus' Bride: The Boy From the West and the Knight of the Mountain Haze | 3 | Studio Kafka | Kazuaki Terasawa | Mahō Tsukai no Yome: Nishi no Shōnen to Seiran no Kishi | |
| September 15 | Alice Gear Aegis: Heart Pounding! Actress Packed Mermaid Grand Prix! | | Nomad | Hirokazu Hanai | | |
| November 14 – January 24, 2022 | Hakuoki | 3 | Studio Deen | Osamu Yamasaki | | |
| December 1 | Given: On the Other Hand | 1 | Lerche | Akiyo Ōhashi | Given: Uragawa no Sonzai | |
| December 24 | Girls und Panzer das Finale: Daikon War! | 1 | Actas | | | |

== Deaths ==
=== February ===
- February 8: Shūichirō Moriyama, Japanese voice actor (Adieu Galaxy Express 999, Ninja Scroll, Porco Rosso), dies from pneumonia at age 86.
- February 25: Masako Sugaya, Japanese voice actress (Aim for the Ace!, Nobody's Boy Remi, Perman, Urusei Yatsura), dies at age 83 while undergoing medical treatment for an illness.
- February 27: Tasuku Saitō, Japanese animation producer (Gegege no Kitarō, Shōnen Ninja Kaze no Fujimaru, Tiger Mask), dies at age 87.

=== March ===
- March 15:
  - Masahiro Anzai, Japanese voice actor (Sailor Moon, Urusei Yatsura), dies from acute heart failure at age 66.
  - Yasuo Otsuka, Japanese animator (Future Boy Conan, Lupin the Third, The Great Adventure of Horus, Prince of the Sun), dies at age 89.
- March 16: Minako Shiba, Japanese animator and character designer (Black Butler, Hikaru no Go, Noir), dies at age 50.

=== April ===
- April 16: Fumio Hisamatsu, Japanese manga artist and animator (Bōken Gabotenjima, Shōnen Ninja Kaze no Fujimaru, Super Jetter), dies at age 77.
- April 17: Osamu Kobayashi, Japanese animation director (Beck, End of the World, Naruto: Shippuden, Paradise Kiss), dies from a colon infection caused by kidney cancer at age 57.
- April 24: Shunsuke Kikuchi, Japanese composer (Doraemon, Dragon Ball, Dr. Slump, Getter Robo, Tiger Mask), dies from aspiration pneumonia at age 89.

=== May ===
- May 6: Kentaro Miura, Japanese manga artist (Berserk), dies from acute aortic dissection at age 54.
- May 30: Haruka Nagashima, Japanese voice actress (Idol Incidents, Shiki, Sparrow's Hotel), dies at age 33 while undergoing medical treatment for an illness.

=== July ===
- July 1: Philece Sampler, American voice actress, dies from a heart attack at age 67.

=== August ===
- August 17: Masami Suda, Japanese animator and character designer (Fist of the North Star, Slam Dunk, Speed Racer), dies at age 77.

=== September ===
- September 7: Eiichi Yamamoto, Japanese animation director and screenwriter (Belladonna of Sadness, Cleopatra, Kimba the White Lion), dies at age 80.
- September 24: Takao Saitō, Japanese manga artist (Golgo 13), dies from pancreatic cancer at age 84.
- September 30: Koichi Sugiyama, Japanese music composer (Cyborg 009, Dragon Quest: The Adventure of Dai, Space Runaway Ideon), dies from septic shock at age 90.

=== October ===
- October 18: Christopher Ayres, American voice actor and ADR director (Dragon Ball Z Kai, Dragon Ball Super, Gantz), dies from complications of COPD at age 56.
- October 21: Saori Sugimoto, Japanese voice actress (Mobile Suit Gundam Wing, Nintama Rantarō, Shima Shima Tora no Shimajirō), dies from congestive heart failure caused by anorexia at age 58.
- October 29: Yoshiko Ota, Japanese voice actress (Himitsu no Akko-chan, Kimba the White Lion, Princess Knight), dies from heart failure at age 89.

=== November ===
- November 5: Kinji Yoshimoto, Japanese animation director (Arifureta: From Commonplace to World's Strongest, Genshiken, Queen's Blade), dies at age 55.

=== December ===
- December 1: Keiko Nobumoto, Japanese screenwriter (Cowboy Bebop, Tokyo Godfathers, Wolf's Rain), dies from esophageal cancer at age 57.
- December 3: Jōji Yanami, Japanese voice actor (Dragon Ball Z, Inuyasha, One Piece) and narrator (Dragon Ball), dies at age 90.
- December 8: Mitsutoshi Furuya, Japanese manga artist (Dame Oyaji), dies from cancer at age 85.
- December 18: Sayaka Kanda, Japanese voice actress (Japanese dub voice of Anna in the Frozen franchise, Idoly Pride, Real Girl, Sword Art Online), dies from a suspected suicide at age 35.

== See also ==
- 2021 in Japanese television
