= Women's football in Japan =

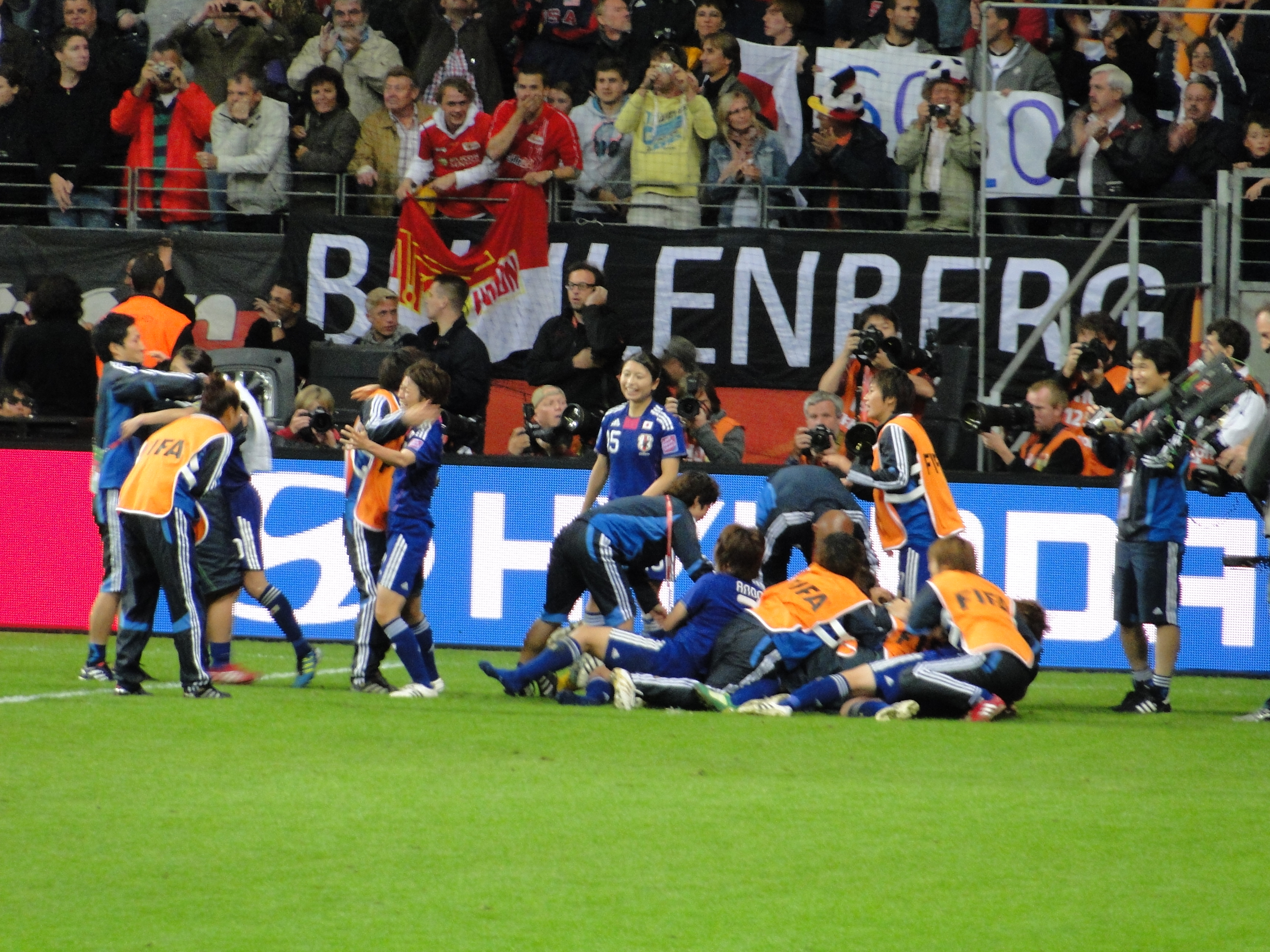
- Celebration after winning the 2011 World Cup
- Country: Japan
- Governing body: Japan Football Association
- National team(s): Japan women's national football team

National competitions
- Empress's Cup; WE League Cup

Club competitions
- WE League; Nadeshiko League

International competitions
- FIFA Women's World Cup (National Team); Summer Olympics (National Team); AFC Women's Asian Cup (National Team); Asian Games (National Team); EAFF Women's Championship (National Team)

Women's football in Japan is one of the rising powers of women's football.

== History ==
The first women's football team in Japan was formed in 1966.

In the first national female football tournament in 1980, women played 8-a-side football and on smaller soccer fields than their male counterparts.

== National competition ==
The WE League was established in the 2021–22 season as Japan's first fully professional women's football league. It replaced the top level Nadeshiko League as the country's top women's league. The Nadeshiko League now occupies the two levels below the WE League.

The Nadeshiko League began in 1989. It was a three-tiered system, but has since reverted to a two-tier system.

== National team ==
The team, organized by the Japan Football Association, is the only Asian women's side to win FIFA Women's World Cup, winning in 2011. The Japanese national team playing style has been compared to Spain's men's national team of Tiki-taka.

== In Fiction ==
- While there are not many depictions of Japanese women's football in fiction, one prominent example is the manga Mai Ball! by Inoue Sora. It depicts a Japanese high school girls' team as they rise to the challenge of being the national best in the Japanese high school girls' football tournament. Another example are the manga Sayonara, Football and Farewell, My Dear Cramer, both written by Naoshi Arakawa. An anime TV show and a film adaptation of the series were released in 2021.

== See also ==
- Sports in Japan
  - Football in Japan
    - Women's football in Japan
- Japan Football Association (JFA)
- Japanese association football league system
- WE League (I)
- Nadeshiko League
  - Nadeshiko League Division 1 (II)
  - Nadeshiko League Division 2 (III)
- Regional Leagues (IV)
- Empress's Cup (National Cup)
- WE League Cup (League Cup)
