= Henry Kingman =

Henry Kingman was the founder of H.K. Webster, a feed manufacturing company in Lawrence, Massachusetts. The company is now part of Blue Seal.
