= Natsuko Takahashi =

Japanese anime screenwriter

- 高橋ナツコ
- Occupations: Anime writer and screenwriter
- Years active: 1995–present
- Known for: Gankutsuou: The Count of Monte Cristo, Nura: Rise of the Yokai Clan, Farewell, My Dear Cramer

Natsuko Takahashi (Japanese: 高橋ナツコ, Hepburn: Takahashi Natsuko) is a Japanese anime screenwriter. After learning about the profession of screenwriting in middle school, in university she entered a contest. Although her entry did not fit the theme of the contest, the examiners liked it so much that they gave her a position working on television dramas.

Using contacts she made while working on dramas, she was given opportunities to start working on various anime series. Some of the more popular series she has worked on include Bleach, Gankutsuou: The Count of Monte Cristo, Nura: Rise of the Yokai Clan, and Farewell, My Dear Cramer.

== Biography ==
Takahashi first learned about screenwriting when she was just entering middle school. Takahashi herself was a fan of drama and anime series and learned how to do screenwriting through them. Later in middle school, she read a book by a scriptwriter whom she admired, which inspired her to become one herself. While she was attending university, Takahashi submitted a scenario in a writing contest. She did not win because the story she wrote did not match the required theme, but despite this, the examiners were sufficiently impressed that they gave her a position working on television dramas. Takahashi herself was an anime fan, so she leveraged this experience to get a position working on anime series instead.

Around 2001, Takahashi started working on anime titles, specifically with the role of head screenwriter for Zaion: I Wish You Were Here. In 2005, Takahashi did screenplay for Gankutsuou: The Count of Monte Cristo, which won the award for best TV series at the Animation Kobe that year. In 2010, Takahashi was the head screenwriter for the anime adaptation of Nura: Rise of the Yokai Clan, based on the manga serialized in Weekly Shōnen Jump. In 2021, Takahashi was the head screenwriter for the anime adaptation of Naoshi Arakawa's Farewell, My Dear Cramer.

== Works ==
=== Anime TV series ===
- Spiral: The Bonds of Reasoning (2002–2003) (screenwriter)
- Gankutsuou: The Count of Monte Cristo (2004–2005) (screenplay)
- Gakuen Heaven (2006) (screenwriter)
- Kōtetsu Sangokushi (2007) (screenwriter)
- Blue Drop (2007) (screenwriter)
- Fantastic Detective Labyrinth (2007–2008) (screenwriter)
- You're Under Arrest: Full Throttle (2007–2008) (screenwriter)
- Moyasimon: Tales of Agriculture (2007) (screenwriter)
- Antique Bakery (2008) (screenwriter)
- Higepiyo (2009) (screenwriter)
- 07-Ghost (2009) (screenwriter)
- Tokyo Magnitude 8.0 (2009) (screenwriter)
- The Betrayal Knows My Name (2010) (screenwriter)
- Nura: Rise of the Yokai Clan (2010–2011) (screenwriter)
- Togainu no Chi (2010) (screenwriter)
- Nyanpire: The Animation (2011) (screenwriter)
- Yuyushiki (2013) (screenwriter)
- Brothers Conflict (2013) (screenwriter)
- Lady Jewelpet (2014–2015) (screenwriter)
- Sengoku Basara: End of Judgement (2014) (screenwriter)
- Nobunaga Concerto (2014) (screenwriter)
- My Love Story!! (2015) (screenwriter)
- Norn9 (2016) (screenwriter)
- Divine Gate (2016) (screenwriter)
- Monster Hunter Stories: Ride On (2016–2018) (screenwriter)
- Poco's Udon World (2016) (screenwriter)
- Long Riders! (2016–2017) (screenwriter)
- Love Tyrant (2017) (screenwriter)
- Kenka Bancho Otome: Girl Beats Boys (2017) (screenwriter)
- Love and Lies (2017) (screenwriter)
- In Another World with My Smartphone (2017) (screenwriter)
- Urahara (2017) (screenwriter)
- Hakyu Hoshin Engi (2018) (screenwriter)
- Comic Girls (2018) (screenwriter)
- Cutie Honey Universe (2018) (screenwriter)
- 100 Sleeping Princes and the Kingdom of Dreams (2018) (screenwriter)
- The Master of Ragnarok & Blesser of Einherjar (2018) (screenwriter)
- A Destructive God Sits Next to Me (2020) (screenwriter)
- Tsukiuta: The Animation 2 (2020) (screenwriter)
- Farewell, My Dear Cramer (2021) (screenwriter)
- The Aristocrat's Otherworldly Adventure: Serving Gods Who Go Too Far (2023) (screenwriter)
- Stardust Telepath (2023) (screenwriter)
- Anne Shirley (2025) (screenwriter)
- The Food Diary of Miss Maid (2026) (screenwriter)
- Heavily Armed High School Girls (2027) (screenwriter)

=== Anime films ===
- Bleach: Fade to Black (2008) (screenwriter)
- Bleach: Hell Verse (2010) (screenwriter)
- Farewell, My Dear Cramer First Touch (2021) (screenwriter)
- Blue Thermal (2022) (screenwriter)

=== Original video animation ===
- Ane Log (2014–2015) (screenwriter)

=== Web series ===
- Zaion: I Wish You Were Here (2001) (screenwriter)

=== Live-action ===
- Ōoku: The Inner Chambers (2010) (screenwriter)
- Bartender (2011) (screenwriter)
- No Touching At All (2014) (screenwriter)
- Seven Days (2015) (screenwriter)
- Does the Flower Blossom? (2018) (screenwriter)

=== Print ===
- Sapphire: Princess Knight (serialized in Nakayoshi from 2008 to 2009; illustrated by Pink Hanamori)
- Cute High Earth Defense Club Love! (2015 light novel; illustrated by Yumiko Hara)
