= Sinbad (film series) =

Japanese animated film series

- Promotional poster for the compilation film's Japanese theatrical release.

シンドバッド
- Genre: Action/Adventure, Fantasy, Family
- Anime film

Sinbad: A Flying Princess and a Secret Island
- Directed by: Shinpei Miyashita
- Produced by: Kentaro Koike; Takashi Inoue
- Written by: Kaeko Hayafune
- Music by: Hiroaki Ohno
- Studio: Nippon Animation; Shirogumi
- Released: July 4, 2015
- Runtime: 50 minutes
- Anime film

Sinbad: The Magic Lamp and the Moving Islands
- Directed by: Shinpei Miyashita
- Produced by: Kentaro Koike; Takashi Inoue
- Written by: Hiroyuki Kawasaki
- Music by: Hiroaki Ohno
- Studio: Nippon Animation; Shirogumi
- Released: January 16, 2016
- Runtime: 50 minutes
- Anime film

Sinbad: Night at High Noon and the Wonder Gate
- Directed by: Terumi Toyama
- Produced by: Kentaro Koike; Takashi Inoue
- Written by: Hiroyuki Kawasaki
- Music by: Hiroaki Ohno
- Studio: Nippon Animation; Shirogumi
- Released: May 14, 2016
- Runtime: 50 minutes
- Anime film

Sinbad (compilation film)
- Directed by: Shinpei Miyashita; Terumi Toyama
- Produced by: Kentaro Koike; Takashi Inoue
- Written by: Hiroyuki Kawasaki
- Music by: Hiroaki Ohno
- Studio: Nippon Animation; Shirogumi
- Released: May 14, 2016
- Runtime: 113 minutes

Sinbad (シンドバッド) is a series of Japanese animated family adventure films inspired by One Thousand and One Nights and produced by Nippon Animation and Shirogumi. Made in celebration of the former company's 40th anniversary, the trilogy of films were directed by Shinpei Miyashita and written by Kaeko Hayafune and Hiroyuki Kawasaki. Miyashita died during the production of the third film, which was later dedicated to him. The film was finished by his student, Terumi Toyama.

The first film, A Flying Princess and a Secret Island (空とぶ姫と秘密の島; Sora Tobu Hime to Himitsu no Shima), was released in Japan on July 4, 2015, by Aeon Entertainment. Pony Canyon released it on DVD on December 16, 2015. The second film, The Magic Lamp and the Moving Islands (魔法のランプと動く島; Mahō no Lamp to Ugoku Shima), was released theatrically on January 16, 2016, and on DVD on May 3, 2016. The third and final film, Night at High Noon and the Wonder Gate (～真昼の夜とふしぎの門～; Mahiru no Yoru to Fushigi no Mon), was released theatrically as part of a compilation with the two others films on May 14, 2016. It was later released individually on DVD on December 21, 2016.

The three films were released in Japanese with English subtitles and with an English dub by Ocean Productions on Amazon Video in the United States and the United Kingdom in April 2017.

On 8 August 2021, an Indian Kids TV channel ETV Bal Bharat premiered Sinbad (the compilation film), dubbed in 12 different languages (audio feeds): English, Hindi, Tamil, Telugu, Marathi, Bengali, Punjabi, Malayalam, Kannada, Assamese, Gujarati and Odia.

== Cast ==
=== Japanese ===
- Tomo Muranaka as Sinbad
- Naomi Nagasawa as Ali
- Momoko Tanabe as Sana
- Hiroko Yakushimaru as Latifa, Sinbad's mother
- Takeshi Kaga as Captain Razzak

=== English ===
- Cole Howard as Sinbad
- Travis Turner as Ali
- Elyse Maloway as Sana
- Rebecca Shoichet as Latifa, Sinbad's mother
- Michael Adamthwaite as Captain Razzak
- Riley Murdock as Galip

== Reception ==
The films received a positive reception. Rebecca Silverman of Anime News Network reviewed all three films, describing them as family-friendly and a "magical, beautiful story about exploration and finding where you belong," noting the homages to the original story of Sinbad the Sailor in One Thousand and One Nights, and praised the designs of creatures, background art, and voice casts, and called the ending of Night at High Noon and the Wonder Gate more bittersweet than "most American family films." She criticized Galip's character for being underdeveloped and argued that "Ali can be really annoying."
