= Atwight Game =

Japanese manga series

- First tankōbon volume cover

アトワイトゲーム (Atowaito Gēmu)
- Genre: Fantasy
- Manga
- Written by: Naoshi Arakawa
- Published by: Kodansha
- Imprint: Shōnen Magazine Comics
- Magazine: Weekly Shōnen Magazine
- Original run: September 28, 2022 – April 12, 2023
- Volumes: 3
- icon

Atwight Game (Japanese: アトワイトゲーム, Hepburn: Atowaito Gēmu) is a Japanese manga series written and illustrated by Naoshi Arakawa. It was serialized in Kodansha's shōnen manga magazine Weekly Shōnen Magazine from September 2022 to April 2023, with its chapters collected in three tankōbon volumes.

== Publication ==
Written and illustrated by Naoshi Arakawa, Atwight Game was serialized in Kodansha's shōnen manga magazine Weekly Shōnen Magazine from September 28, 2022, to April 12, 2023. The series' chapters were collected into three tankōbon volumes, released from December 16, 2022, to June 15, 2023.

No.	Release date	ISBN
1	December 16, 2022	978-4-06-529717-9
2	March 16, 2023	978-4-06-530929-2
3	June 15, 2023	978-4-06-531887-4
