= Heavily Armed High School Girls =

Japanese line of action figures

重兵装型女子高生 (Jūheisōgata Joshikōsei)
- Created by: Neco
- Anime television series
- Directed by: Masaki Tachibana
- Written by: Natsuko Takahashi
- Original run: 2027 – scheduled
- Video game

JJK: Jū Heisōgata Joshi Kōsei Wordless Record
- Developer: NextNinja
- Genre: Role-playing game
- Platform: Android, iOS

Heavily Armed High School Girls (Japanese: 重兵装型女子高生, Hepburn: Jūheisōgata Joshikōsei) is a Japanese line of action figures based on illustrations by Neco. The first illustration in the series was posted on Neco's Pixiv account on February 13, 2014. Max Factory later began adapting the illustrations and setting into a line of toy figurines under its Figma line in 2018, with a Nendoroid figure being released in 2019. The series was also featured in an exhibition of Neco's work in 2026.

An anime television series adaptation is set to premiere in 2027. A mobile game adaptation has also been announced.

== Other media ==
=== Anime ===
An anime television series adaptation was announced on June 5, 2026. The series will be directed by Masaki Tachibana, with Natsuko Takahashi handling series composition. It is set to premiere in 2027.

=== Mobile game ===
A mobile game adaptation was announced on October 14, 2026. Titled JJK: Jū Heisōgata Joshi Kōsei Wordless Record and developed by NextNinja, the game is an idle RPG, and it takes place from the perspective of a cat that can watch and interact with the characters.
