= Orion's Board =

Japanese manga series

- First tankōbon volume cover

盤上のオリオン (Banjō no Orion)
- Genre: Coming-of-age; Romance
- Manga
- Written by: Naoshi Arakawa
- Published by: Kodansha
- English publisher: Kodansha (digital)
- Imprint: Shōnen Magazine Comics
- Magazine: Weekly Shōnen Magazine
- Original run: January 10, 2024 – present
- Volumes: 11
- icon

Orion's Board (Japanese: 盤上のオリオン, Hepburn: Banjō no Orion) is a Japanese manga series written and illustrated by Naoshi Arakawa. It has been serialized in Kodansha's shōnen manga magazine Weekly Shōnen Magazine since January 2024.

== Story ==
Shogi prodigy Yuuhi Ninomiya, once a rising star, has lost his edge and endures a relentless losing streak. His path crosses with Tsuki Kayamori, an eccentric girl who plays shogi in a bar. Despite her brash and unpredictable personality, Tsuki's unconventional playstyle is unnaturally precise. Set in the competitive world of professional shogi, the story explores their evolving rivalry and partnership as they navigate the pressures of talent, ambition, and personal growth.

== Publication ==
Written and illustrated by Naoshi Arakawa, Orion's Board started in Kodansha's shōnen manga magazine Weekly Shōnen Magazine on January 10, 2024. Kodansha has collected its chapters into individual tankōbon volumes, with the first one released on April 17, 2024. As of September 16, 2026, eleven volumes have been released.

The series is simultaneously published in English by Kodansha on its K Manga online platform.

=== Volumes ===
No.	Release date	ISBN
1	April 17, 2024	978-4-06-535117-8
2	June 17, 2024	978-4-06-535782-8
3	September 17, 2024	978-4-06-536772-8
4	December 17, 2024	978-4-06-537771-0
5	March 17, 2025	978-4-06-538714-6
6	June 17, 2025	978-4-06-539763-3
7	September 17, 2025	978-4-06-540660-1
8	December 17, 2025	978-4-06-541947-2
9	March 17, 2026	978-4-06-542962-4
10	June 17, 2026	978-4-06-543885-5
11	September 16, 2026	978-4-06-544980-6

== Reception ==
The first volume of the series sold out and was reprinted the following month of its debut due to high demand.

The series was nominated for the 49th Kodansha Manga Award in the shōnen category in 2025.
