= Otaku USA =

Otaku-themed biannual magazine

- Cover of Spring 2024 issue, featuring Sacrificial Princess and the King of Beasts
- Editor: Patrick Macias
- Categories: Anime and Manga
- Frequency: Biannual
- First issue: August 2007
- Final issue: September 2025
- Company: Sovereign Media
- Country: United States
- Based in: McLean, Virginia, US
- Website: Otaku USA
- ISSN: 1939-3318

Otaku USA was a biannual magazine published by Sovereign Media, which covers various elements of the "otaku" lifestyle (such as anime, manga, video games, cosplay and Japanese popular music) from an American perspective. The issues were accompanied by a DVD featuring three anime episodes but as of 2009 the DVD feature was dropped and the double sided poster feature of the Magazine was also dropped starting with the February 2010 issue.

Otaku USA began publication in August 2007. The editor-in-chief of the magazine is Patrick Macias. After the shutdown of Newtype USA in February 2008, Anime Insider in March 2009, Shonen Jump in April 2012, and the discontinuation of Protoculture Addicts since August 2008, Otaku USA is the only remaining bimonthly anime news magazine published for the North American market. Trans-Atlantic competitor Neo, a British-based title was shut down in November 2024, leaving Otaku USA, sister publication Anime USA, and academic journal Mechademia: Second Arc as the remaining anime publications in English-speaking world.

In early September 2025, posts to the magazine's website and social media halted while the magazine changed from publishing four times per year to biannual. However, publication never resumed.

== Content ==
Each issue includes an otaku section, and reviews and commentary on various anime, manga, video games and live action films and TV shows. The otaku section informs readers of releases of BDs, video games, cosplay items and related goods. In each issue there are two manga previews printed in black and white featuring the original art with English text. There are also a small number of in-depth anime reviews, most of which are four pages long.

Each issue of Otaku USA is over 100 pages and includes a 32-page insert containing new manga excerpts from leading North American publishers, including VIZ Media, Dark Horse, Yen Press, Kodansha and Vertical. Notable titles recently featured in the magazine include Tiger & Bunny (VIZ), Blood-C (Dark Horse), and Moto Hagio's seminal shounen ai work The Heart of Thomas (Fantagraphics).

== Availability ==
The magazine is available in a print edition at bookstores, newsstands, Walmart, and select comic retailers. It's also available in digital format on iTunes for the iPad and iPhone, as well as formats compatible with Kindle, Android, PC, and Mac computers. Both print and digital editions are also available by subscription.

Otaku USA is available all over the world, with international distribution by Curtis Circulation.

In addition to the print publication, Otaku USA publishes a regular e-newsletter from Japan containing current industry news, as well as interviews with anime creators, travel-style cultural pieces, reviews of theatrical anime films, and more. Subscriptions to the newsletter are free and delivered by e-mail.

The official website acts as an extension of the magazine, with new material pertaining to anime, manga, cosplay, events, games, and Japanese pop culture. Features include companion stories to many of the stories published in the magazine, as well as regular columns from contributors covering anime, weekly manga releases, cosplay, convention reports, and more.

== Sister magazines ==
=== Anime USA ===
Anime USA started out as a bonus issue of the main magazine before being split off into a separate entity in May 2015. In the original bonus issue, editor Joseph Luster called the issue "special", saying that it would turn its focus towards Anime. Some of the reviews in the issue include Terraformars, Parasyte -the maxim-, Mysterious Joker, World Trigger, Gugure! Kokkuri-san, and Tribe Cool Crew. The adapted magazine continues to be issued quarterly with various reviews on the latest anime series.

=== Cosplay USA ===
Cosplay USA was published once for the Summer of 2013 as a special issue to the main magazine. The magazines cover features a cosplayer dressed as Hatsune Miku, and features editorials such as "The History of Cosplay", and "My Life as a Cosplayer". In addition, there are also galleries of various known cosplayers from both the United States, and Japan.

== See also ==
- List of manga magazines published outside of Japan
