= Shirogumi =

Japanese animation and visual effects company

Shirogumi Inc.
- Native name: 株式会社白組
- Romanized name: Kabushiki-gaisha Shirogumi
- Type: Kabushiki gaisha
- Industry: Animation studio, computer-generated imagery
- Founded: August 28, 1974; 52 years ago
- Founder: Tatsuo Shimamura
- Headquarters: Sangenjaya, Setagaya, Tokyo, Japan
- Key people: Takashi Yamazaki; Yoichi Ogawa; Ryuichi Yagi
- Total equity: ¥ 495,000,000
- Website: shirogumi.com

Shirogumi Inc. (Japanese: 株式会社白組, Hepburn: Kabushiki-gaisha Shirogumi; lit. 'White Team Co., Ltd.') is a company centralized in the production of animated series and feature films, as well as the making and adjusting of visual effects. It is also a member of The Association of Japanese Animations.

== History ==
In 1973, Tatsuo Shimamura established Tatsuo studio (Japanese: 島村企画室). To expand business, the studio was disbanded and found the company known today.

The company owns computer graphics and VFX technology, so they produced many original live-action films like Juvenile and Returner. They made the first anime production Moyasimon: Tales of Agriculture in 2007.

Apart from the headquarters in Aoyama, Minato, Tokyo, the company has a sub-studio based in Chōfu, Tokyo. Like the mainstream, they also have various sub-studios in Tokyo.

In order to develop human resources, they cooperate with Human Holdings Co., Ltd. (Japanese: ヒューマンホールディングス株式会社), establishing the Shirogumi Human Studio (Japanese: 白組ヒューマンスタジオ) in Takadanobaba, Shinjuku in 2004.

== Works ==
=== Television series ===
Title	Broadcast channel	First run start date	First run end date	Eps.	Note(s)	Ref(s)
Moyasimon: Tales of Agriculture	Fuji TV (Noitamina)	October 12, 2007	December 21, 2007	11	Based on a manga written by Masayuki Ishikawa. Co-produced with Telecom Animation Film.	
Antique Bakery	Fuji TV (Noitamina)	July 3, 2008	September 18, 2008	12	Based on a yaoi manga written by Fumi Yoshinaga. Co-produced with Nippon Animation.	
Moyasimon Returns	Fuji TV (Noitamina)	July 5, 2012	September 13, 2012	11	Sequel to Moyasimon: Tales of Agriculture. Co-produced with Telecom Animation Film.	
Yūto-kun ga Iku	Disney XD	June 14, 2013	September 6, 2013	26	Original work.	
Baby Gamba	Cartoon Network	June 19, 2014	October 11, 2014	13	Spin-off to The Adventures of Gamba.	
Etotama	Tokyo MX	April 9, 2015	June 25, 2015	12	Based on a manga written by Takashi Hoshi and Tōru Zekū. Co-produced with Encourage Films.	
Nyanbo!	NHK E	September 27, 2016	March 28, 2017	26	Based on the cat versions of the Danbo characters.	
Urahara	Tokyo MX	October 4, 2017	December 20, 2017	12	Based on a webcomic written by Patrick Macias. Co-produced with EMT Squared.	
Uchi no Oochopus	NHK E	January 9, 2018	September 25, 2019	38	Original work.	
Revisions	Fuji TV (+Ultra)	January 10, 2019	March 28, 2019	12	Original work.	
Sushi Sumo	TVK	April 3, 2021	TBA	TBA	Based on a picture book by Masako An.	
Night Head 2041	Fuji TV (+Ultra)	July 15, 2021	September 30, 2021	12	Based on a TV drama series created by George Iida.	
The Idolmaster Million Live!	TV Tokyo	October 8, 2023	December 24, 2023	12	Based on a smartphone game developed and published by Bandai Namco Entertainment.	
The Bugle Call: Song of War	TBA	2027	TBA	TBA	Based on a manga series written by Mozuku Sora and illustrated by Higoro Toumori. Co-produced with CA Soa. Involved in CG Animation Production.	

=== Films ===
Title	Release date	Note(s)	Ref(s)
Friends: Mononoke Shima no Naki	December 17, 2011	Based on the Japanese children's novel Naita Aka Oni written by Hirosuke Hamada.	
Yūto-kun ga Iku	March 31, 2014	Sequel to the TV series of the same title.	
Stand by Me Doraemon	August 8, 2014	Based on the Doraemon manga series. Co-produced with Robot Communications and Shin-Ei Animation.	
Sinbad: A Flying Princess and a Secret Island	July 4, 2015	The first film of the Sinbad film series. Co-produced with Nippon Animation.	
Gamba: Gamba to Nakama-tachi	October 10, 2015	Remake of The Adventures of Gamba.	
Sinbad: The Magic Lamp and the Moving Islands	January 16, 2016	The second film of the Sinbad film series. Co-produced with Nippon Animation.	
Sinbad: Night at High Noon and the Wonder Gate	May 14, 2016	The third and final film of the Sinbad film series. Co-produced with Nippon Animation.	
Dragon Quest: Your Story	August 2, 2019	Based on the video game Dragon Quest V by Square Enix. Co-Produced with Robot Communications.	
Stand by Me Doraemon 2	November 20, 2020	Sequel to Stand by Me Doraemon. Co-produced with Robot Communications and Shin-Ei Animation.	
Doraemon: Nobita's Little Star Wars 2021	March 4, 2022	The 41st installment in the Doraemon film series. Co-produced with Shin-Ei Animation.	
Shin Jigen! Crayon Shin-chan The Movie Chōnōryoku Dai Kessen: Tobetobe Temakizushi	August 4, 2023	The 31st installment in the Crayon Shin-chan film series.	
Godzilla Minus One	November 3, 2023	The 37th film in the Godzilla franchise.	
Godzilla Minus Zero	November 3, 2026	The 39th film in the Godzilla franchise.	

=== Original net animations ===
Title	Release date	Note(s)	Ref(s)
Etotama ~Nyan-Kyaku Banrai~	May 25, 2021	Based on a manga written by Takashi Hoshi and Tōru Zekū. Co-produced with Encourage Films.	
