= Urahara =

Japanese anime television series

- Urahara key visual

浦原 (Urahara)
- Genre: Science fiction, comedy
- Created by: Patrick Macias
- Anime television series
- Directed by: Amika Kubo
- Produced by: VAP
- Written by: Natsuko Takahashi
- Music by: Yasunori Iwasaki
- Studio: EMT Squared; Shirogumi
- Licensed by: Crunchyroll; SEA: Medialink
- Original network: Tokyo MX, BS Fuji, AT-X
- Original run: October 4, 2017 – December 20, 2017
- Episodes: 12

PARK Harajuku: Crisis Team!
- Author: Patrick Macias
- Illustrator: Mugi Tanaka
- Publisher: Crunchyroll
- Original run: May 2015

URL

Urahara (Japanese: 浦原, Hepburn: Urahara) is a Japanese anime television series based on the webcomic PARK Harajuku: Crisis Team!, which is written by Patrick Macias and illustrated by Mugi Tanaka. The anime adaptation was co-produced by EMT Squared and Shirogumi and aired from October to December 2017.

== Synopsis ==
Three high school girls hailing from Harajuku band together to fight off culture thieving aliens from outer space.

== Cast ==
Character	Japanese	English
Rito Sudo	Luna Haruna	Julie Shields
Mari Shirako	Sumire Uesaka	Alexis Tipton
Kotoko Watatsumugi	Manaka Iwami	Sarah Wiedenheft
Ebifuruya	Yasunori Matsumoto	Anthony Bowling
Misa Maruno	Kokoa Amano	Monica Rial
Ebi	Yasunori Matsumoto	Chris Wehkamp
Sayumin	Riho Iida	Tia Ballard

== Anime ==
Production of the anime adaptation was announced in March 2017. Amika Kubo directed the series at EMT Squared and Shirogumi. The production staff consists of Masatsugu Arakawa as the chief director, Natsuko Takahashi is in charge of series composition, Mariko Fujita as the animation character designer, and Takahiro Yamada as the mechanical designer. It aired from October 4 to December 20, 2017. Crunchyroll streamed the series. Funimation premiered the dub on October 24, 2017. The opening theme is "Antithesis Escape" by Sumire Uesaka, and the ending theme is "KIRAMEKI☆Lifeline" (KIRAMEKI☆ライフライン, Sparkling Lifeline) by Luna Haruna.

=== Episode list ===
No.	Title (Note: All English titles are taken from Crunchyroll.)	Directed by	Written by	Original release date
1	"Donut Crisis" "Dōnatsu kuraishisu" (ドーナツクライシス)	Directed by : Takatoshi Suzuki; Storyboarded by : Masatsugu Arakawa	Natsuko Takahashi	October 4, 2017
2	"Popcorn Panic" "Poppukōn panikku" (ポップコーンパニック)	Directed by : Kiyoshi Murayama; Storyboarded by : Kenichi Maejima	Natsuko Takahashi; Daisuke Watanabe	October 11, 2017
3	"Crêpe Craving" "Kurēpu kurēbingu" (クレープクレービング)	Shinya Une	Jun Narita; Natsuko Takahashi	October 18, 2017
4	"Ice Cream Fever" "Aisukurīmu fībā" (アイスクリームフィーバー)	Directed by : Yoshito Hata; Storyboarded by : Hisashi Ishii	Daisuke Watanabe; Natsuko Takahashi	October 25, 2017
5	"Gummy Gummy Dummy" "Gumigumidamī" (グミグミダミー)	Atsushi Nigorikawa	Yukie Sugawara	November 1, 2017
6	"Cotton Heart" "Kotton Hāto" (コットンハート)	Directed by : Toshiaki Kamihara; Storyboarded by : Kenichi Maejima	Jun Narita; Natsuko Takahashi	November 8, 2017
7	"Sakuramochi Blues" "Sakura mochi burū" (サクラモチブルー)	Directed by : Yukio Kuroda; Storyboarded by : Hiroyuki Shimazu	Shigeki Okusa; Natsuko Takahashi	November 15, 2017
8	"Fabulous Crêpe" "Fabyurasu kurēpu" (ファビュラスクレープ)	Directed by : Kiyoshi Murayama; Storyboarded by : Kenichi Maejima	Masahiro Okubo	November 22, 2017
9	"Bitter Candy" "bitākyandī" (ビターキャンディー)	Directed by : Takatoshi Suzuki; Storyboarded by : Hisashi Ishii	Jun Narita	November 29, 2017
10	"Swallowing Queen" "Marunomikuīn" (マルノミクィーン)	Directed by : Eiichi Kuboyama; Storyboarded by : Kenichi Maejima	Shigeki Okusa	December 6, 2017
11	"Fried Shrimp Runaway" "Ebifurairannawei" (エビフライランナウェイ)	Directed by : Yoshito Hata; Storyboarded by : Tomio Yamauchi	Masahiro Okubo; Natsuko Takahashi	December 13, 2017
12	"Goodbye Parfait" "Gubbaipafe" (グッバイパフェ)	Directed by : Mihiro Yamaguchi; Storyboarded by : Hiroyuki Shimazu	Natsuko Takahashi	December 20, 2017
