= Zaion: I Wish You Were Here =

2001 original video animation

- Jacket art of the DVD collection published by ADV Films featuring the two protagonists

あなたがここにいてほしい (Anata ga koko ni Itehoshii)
- Genre: Action, romance, science fiction
- Created by: Gonzo
- Original net animation
- Directed by: Seiji Mizushima
- Produced by: Atsushi Yamamori; Yasuki Miki; Kazuhiko Ikeguchi; Manabu Ishikawa
- Written by: Natsuko Takahashi
- Music by: Kenji Kawai
- Studio: Gonzo; Digimation
- Licensed by: AUS: Madman Entertainment; NA/UK: Funimation
- Released: October 4, 2001 – November 3, 2001
- Episodes: 4

Zaion: I Wish You Were Here (Japanese: あなたがここにいてほしい, Hepburn: Anata ga koko ni Itehoshii) is a four-episode Japanese original net animation (ONA) released by Gonzo in 2001. The science fiction story is set in the near future, when Earth is threatened by a spaceborne virus that turns humans into violent creatures and enhanced soldiers are fighting a war against the creatures in order to ensure the survival of the human race. The series was directed by Seiji Mizushima and written by Natsuko Takahashi. Music for the series was composed by Kenji Kawai.

== Plot ==
In the year 2000, the CDC discovers a meteorite-borne virus known as M34 that alters the molecular structure of the human body and turns its victims into violent creatures. In 2002, the World Health Organization establishes an internal organization called the "Committee of the Universal Resolution of Ecocatastrophe" (CURE), with several international branches, in order to eradicate the virus, which has infected three percent of the human population. CURE creates an elite unit of soldiers called "NOA", an acronym for the "Nano Osmolar Armor" they wear, and units of unmanned robots called "Multi-purpose Operative Beings" (MOB) that assist NOA in the field. CURE's branches also begin secret work on special superhuman weapons, codenamed UNIT and each given an alphabetic suffix.

In 2004, as the missions begin to take their toll on NOA's ranks, NOA soldier Yuuji Tamiya (田宮 ユウジ, Tamiya Yūji) (voiced by Joe Odagiri in Japanese and Joey Hood in English) becomes angry when he learns of CURE's Japanese branch's UNIT project, known as UNIT-i, and that they're not using it. UNIT-i is a girl named Ai (アイ) (voiced by Yukari Tamura in Japanese and Christa Kimlicko Jones in English) who is able to create a projected being that can destroy the creatures.

During the next outbreak, several victims of the virus fuse together into a larger creature that overwhelms the NOA soldiers. CURE decides to put Ai's ability to the test, and the projected being destroys the creature.

Yuuji is quarantined after coming into contact with one of the creatures, but is released when he recovers from his injuries. However, his blood tests later indicate that the virus has evolved and is attacking the nanomachines in his body. CURE orders Yuuji's arrest, but he escapes and takes Ai hostage. When his condition worsens during their journey, Ai heals him with her powers. Other NOA soldiers catch up with Yuuji and Ai and help them escape, but they are soon found by CURE units and are taken to the NOA facility.

At the NOA facility, the NOA soldiers become victims of the virus as their nanomachines are destroyed. Yuuji is forced to fight them and the CURE units at the same time. Ai uses her powers to eliminate all traces of the virus in the facility, curing the infected NOA soldiers.

A larger outbreak occurs elsewhere in the city, and the virus further evolves to mimic the nanomachines' abilities. Yuuji delays the creatures' advance as Ai creates the projected being and uses all of her power to purge the infected area of the virus. Yuuji and Ai are later discharged from CURE and spend time together, free from their duties at last.

== Media ==
The first episode of Zaion was published on the Internet on October 4, 2001. The first two episodes aired later that day on the Kids Station television network. The network aired the final episodes of the series on November 3, 2001.

The ending theme song for the series is "Lunatic Trance: Shizuka naru Zekkyō" (Lunatic Trance～静かなる絶叫～), which was released as a maxi single on November 21, 2001. The song was later included in Gonzo's compilation release of music from its anime works in 2006. The series did not have an opening theme.

Each monthly episode of Zaion was released on DVD by the Japanese distributor, Media Factory. The first episode was released on February 22, 2002, and the final episode was released on May 31, 2002. ADV Films licensed the series for the English language and released the episodes in pairs in 2003. It then repackaged the series into one set, released on February 3, 2009. After ADV Films lost the rights to the series, it was re-licensed by Funimation. Madman Entertainment licensed Zaion for distribution in Australia and New Zealand and released its boxed set on July 26, 2006.

No.	Title	Original release date
1	"Encounter"	October 4, 2001
2	"Farewell"	October 4, 2001
3	"Notice"	November 3, 2001
4	"Presence"	November 3, 2001

== Reception ==
Remote controlled robots, drawn with 3D computer animation

Zaion: I Wish You Were Here had a mixed reception. Patrick King of Animefringe wrote, "On the surface, it may appear to be merely another sci-fi mecha action show. However, Zaion introduced apocalyptic themes similar to those found in Michael Crichton's novel Andromeda Strain and the film 28 Days Later". According to King, the real story of Zaion occurs when Yuuji and Ai develop their relationship, and "we begin to think less of the nanomachine technology and viral invasion of the planet and focus more upon the potential love between these two lonely people, trapped in a labyrinth devoid of an exit". The series was produced with high audio and visual qualities, and was designed with "plausible technical details". King also praised the fitting soundtrack, which was composed by Kenji Kawai and incorporated the sounds of progressive rock.

On the contrary, Jason Bustard of T.H.E.M. Anime Reviews rated the series one out of five stars and accused Gonzo of attempting to "rip off Power Rangers as a last resort". He also pointed out the seemingly oblivious general population of the world in Zaion, which is not at all concerned about the invasion. "If they were trying for some sort of grand social statement here, they succeeded instead in making the vast majority of Japan simply look stupid", Bustard charged.

Zac Bertschy of Anime News Network also rated Zaion below average. Although he criticized the series as a "woefully undercooked and dull bit of science fiction claptrap", he also admitted that it "wouldn't be quite so miserable if the design wasn't as poorly handled as it is". Gonzo, which was known for incorporating experimental animation into its productions, mismanaged the show's 3D computer animation and produced a result that "could have been rendered many years ago in some ancient MS-DOS modeling program". Despite his criticisms, Bertschy called the soundtrack "a truck stop of pleasure on the highway of pain", and praised the professional English-language dub released by ADV Films.

Mania's Chris Beveridge noted that character development between Yuuji and Ai was not consistent. "Yuuji comes across as little more than a blank sheet for the most part with just the scribble of "angst" on him", Beveridge observed. Overall, Gonzo's experimentation with computer animation "look highly fake and out of place".
