= Sushi Sumo =

Japanese anime television series

- Book cover

どすこい すしずもう (Dosukoi Sushi-Zumō)
- Genre: Sports (professional wrestling, sumo)
- Other book
- Written by: Ahn Masako
- Published by: Kodansha
- Published: May 17, 2018
- Volumes: 1
- Anime television series
- Directed by: Yūta Sukegawa
- Written by: Ahn Masako
- Studio: Shirogumi
- Licensed by: Tubi; SA/SEA: Medialink
- Original network: JAITS (TVK, CTC, TVS, GTV, KBS), BS11
- Original run: April 3, 2021 – March 26, 2022
- Episodes: 52

Sushi Sumo (Note: English title is taken from Medialink.) (Japanese: どすこい すしずもう, Hepburn: Dosukoi Sushi-Zumō) is a children's picture book which is written by Ahn Masako and published by Kodansha on 2018. An anime television series adaptation produced by Shirogumi aired from April 3, 2021, to March 26, 2022.

== Plot ==
This is a story where sushi become sumo wrestlers. Each sushi will use their own ingredient to unleash their own techniques. The strongest ingredient has major advantage to win this sumo wrestling.

== Cast ==
Yobidashi Gari
Voiced by: Chiharu Sawashiro
Oyakata Nasubi
Voiced by: Kenjiro Tsuda
Kaisetsusha Ocha
Voiced by: Miyuki Ooshima
Oyakata Takenoko
Voiced by: Kento Hama
Gyouji Wasabi
Voiced by: Kenta Sasa

== Media ==
=== Book ===
No.	Japanese release date	Japanese ISBN
1	May 17, 2018	978-4-06-133351-2

=== Anime ===
No.	Title	Direction (Note: Information is taken from the ending credits of each episode.)	Storyboard	Narration script	Original release date
1	"Tamago Showdown!"; Transliteration: "Tamago Taiketsu!" (Japanese: たまご たいけつ！)	Hiroki Hayashi; Takashi Yoneoka	Yūta Sukegawa	Satoko Kishino	April 3, 2021
2	"Close Encounters"; Transliteration: "Michi to no Sōgū" (Japanese: みちとの そうぐう)	Hiroki Hayashi; Takashi Yoneoka	Yūta Sukegawa	Satoko Kishino	April 10, 2021
3	"Yokozuna Otoro!"; Transliteration: "Otoro Yokozuna!" (Japanese: よこづな おおとろやま！)	Takashi Yoneoka; Hiroki Hayashi	Yūta Sukegawa	Satoko Kishino	April 17, 2021
4	"Kurumaebi, I Will Show You!"; Transliteration: "Misemasu Kurumaebi!" (Japanese: みせます くるまえびぞう！)	Hiroki Hayashi; Takashi Yoneoka	Hiroki Hayashi	Satoko Kishino	April 24, 2021
5	"A Tiny Sushi Wrestler"; Transliteration: "Chīsana Sushi Rikishi" (Japanese: ちいさな すしりきし)	Hiroki Hayashi; Takashi Yoneoka	Yūta Sukegawa	Satoko Kishino	May 1, 2021
6	"Challeng Yokozuna!"; Transliteration: "Ni Chosen Yokozuna!" (Japanese: よこづなに ちょうせん！)	Hiroki Hayashi; Takashi Yoneoka	Yūta Sukegawa	Yūta Sukegawa	May 8, 2021
7	"Rivals Battle!"; Transliteration: "Raibaru Taiketsu!" (Japanese: ライバル たいけつ！)	Hiroki Hayashi; Takashi Yoneoka	Yūta Sukegawa	Satoko Kishino	May 15, 2021
8	"Get in the Spirit!"; Transliteration: "Kiai o Irero!" (Japanese: きあいを いれろ！)	Hiroki Hayashi; Takashi Yoneoka	Yūta Sukegawa	Satoko Kishino	May 22, 2021
9	"Shiny and Sticky!"; Transliteration: "Tsurutsuru Nebaneba!" (Japanese: つるつる ねばねば！)	Takashi Yoneoka; Hiroki Hayashi	Takashi Yoneoka	Satoko Kishino	May 29, 2021
10	"Long Awaited Showdown!"; Transliteration: "Akogare no Taiketsu!" (Japanese: あこがれの たいけつ！)	Takashi Yoneoka; Hiroki Hayashi	Takashi Yoneoka	Satoko Kishino	June 5, 2021
11	"Thrust! Thrust!"; Transliteration: "Tsuppari! Tsuppari!" (Japanese: つっぱり! つっぱり！)	Hiroki Hayashi; Takashi Yoneoka	Yūta Sukegawa	Satoko Kishino	June 12, 2021
12	"Showdown Of The Favorites!"; Transliteration: "Ninkimono Taiketsu!" (Japanese: にんきもの たいけつ！)	Takashi Yoneoka; Hiroki Hayashi	Takashi Yoneoka	Satoko Kishino	June 19, 2021
13	"Run! Round and Round!"; Transliteration: "Hashire Gu～ruguru!" (Japanese: はしれ ぐ～るぐる！)	Takashi Yoneoka; Hiroki Hayashi	Takashi Yoneoka	Satoko Kishino	June 26, 2021
14	"You Can Run, But Can You Win?"; Transliteration: "Nukeru ga Kachi?" (Japanese: ぬけるが かち？)	Takashi Yoneoka; Hiroki Hayashi	Takashi Yoneoka	Satoko Kishino	July 3, 2021
15	"Secret Technique. Suction, Suction!"; Transliteration: "Hisaku. Kyūin, Kyū!" (Japanese: ひさく. きゅういんきゅう！)	Takashi Yoneoka; Hiroki Hayashi	Takashi Yoneoka	Satoko Kishino	July 10, 2021
16	"Shrewd Ikura"; Transliteration: "Chakkari Ikura" (Japanese: ちゃっかり いくらまる)	Tetsuya Kitagawa; Takashi Yoneoka	Tetsuya Kitagawa	Satoko Kishino	July 17, 2021
17	"Second Encounter"; Transliteration: "Nidome no Sōgū" (Japanese: にどめの そうぐう)	Hiroki Hayashi; Takashi Yoneoka	Yūta Sukegawa	Satoko Kishino	July 24, 2021
18	"Uni, The Mysterious Sumo!"; Transliteration: "Uni, no Hana!" (Japanese: なぞのりきし, うにのはな！)	Hiroki Hayashi; Takashi Yoneoka	Hiroki Hayashi	Satoko Kishino	July 31, 2021
19	"Little Fish, Shirasu!"; Transliteration: "Kozakana, Shirasu!" (Japanese: こざかな, しらすまる！)	Takashi Yoneoka; Hiroki Hayashi	Takashi Yoneoka	Satoko Kishino	August 7, 2021
20	"Small Sumo, Big Sumo"; Transliteration: "Chīsai Rikishi, Ōkii Rikishi" (Japanese: ちいさいりきし, おおきいりきし)	Takashi Yoneoka; Hiroki Hayashi	Takashi Yoneoka	Satoko Kishino	August 14, 2021
21	"Salmon, Get Roasted!"; Transliteration: "Salmon, Abure Zakura!" (Japanese: あぶれ, サーモンざくら！)	Hiroki Hayashi; Takashi Yoneoka	Yūta Sukegawa	Satoko Kishino	August 21, 2021
22	"Synced Breathing!"; Transliteration: "Kokyū o Awasete!" (Japanese: こきゅうを あわせて！)	Hiroki Hayashi; Takashi Yoneoka	Yūta Sukegawa	Satoko Kishino	August 28, 2021
23	"Fight Off Or Head On?"; Transliteration: "Hajikeru ka Tatakeru ka?" (Japanese: はじけるか たたけるか？)	Hiroki Hayashi; Takashi Yoneoka	Takashi Yoneoka	Satoko Kishino	September 4, 2021
24	"Saba, You're So Heavy!"; Transliteration: "Saba, Omni zo no Shin!" (Japanese: おもいぞ さばのしん！)	Hiroki Hayashi; Takashi Yoneoka	Yūta Sukegawa	Satoko Kishino	September 11, 2021
25	"Lift Off! A Squid Ink Rocket!"; Transliteration: "Hassha! Ikasumi Roketto!" (Japanese: はっしゃ! いかすみロケット！)	Hiroki Hayashi; Takashi Yoneoka	Yūta Sukegawa	Satoko Kishino	September 18, 2021
26	"A Sticky But Dazzling Victory!"; Transliteration: "Nebaneba de Kinboshi o!" (Japanese: ねばねばで きんぼしを！)	Hiroki Hayashi; Takashi Yoneoka	Yūta Sukegawa	Satoko Kishino	September 25, 2021
27	"Kappa, Fly!!"; Transliteration: "Kappa, no Tobe Kyū!!" (Japanese: とべ, かっぱのきゅう！!)	Hiroki Hayashi; Takashi Yoneoka	Yūta Sukegawa	Satoko Kishino	October 2, 2021
28	"Ebi Ebi Match!"; Transliteration: "Ebi Ebi Taiketsu!" (Japanese: えびえび たいけつ！)	Hiroki Hayashi; Takashi Yoneoka	Hiroki Hayashi	Satoko Kishino	October 9, 2021
29	"Ikura, It's So Delicious!"; Transliteration: "Ikura, yo Oishii!" (Japanese: おいしいよ いくらまる！)	Takashi Yoneoka; Hiroki Hayashi	Takashi Yoneoka	Satoko Kishino	October 16, 2021
30	"Yokozuna's Heart!"; Transliteration: "Yokozuna no Kokoro!" (Japanese: よこづなの こころ！)	Takashi Yoneoka; Hiroki Hayashi	Takashi Yoneoka	Satoko Kishino	October 23, 2021
31	"Sticky Vs Spiky"; Transliteration: "Nebaneba Togetoge" (Japanese: ねばねば とげとげ)	Hiroki Hayashi; Takashi Yoneoka	Yūta Sukegawa	Satoko Kishino	October 30, 2021
32	"Choo-Choo Train!"; Transliteration: "Chū-Chū Torein!" (Japanese: ちゅーちゅ とれいん！)	Hiroki Hayashi; Takashi Yoneoka	Yūta Sukegawa	Satoko Kishino	November 6, 2021
33	"Fugu Trembles!"; Transliteration: "Fugu no Sato Purupuru!" (Japanese: ぷるぷる ふぐのさと！)	Tetsuya Kitagawa; Takashi Yoneoka	Tetsuya Kitagawa	Satoko Kishino	November 13, 2021
34	"Seared Salmon, Show Them!"; Transliteration: "Salmon, Misero Aburi!" (Japanese: みせろ, あぶりサーモン！)	Hiroki Hayashi; Takashi Yoneoka	Yūta Sukegawa	Satoko Kishino	November 20, 2021
35	"Amaebi Fried!"; Transliteration: "Amaebi Furai!" (Japanese: あまえび フライ！)	Hiroki Hayashi; Takashi Yoneoka	Tetsuya Kitagawa	Satoko Kishino	November 27, 2021
36	"Crab Walk, Again?"; Transliteration: "Hanpuku ka, Niwatari?" (Japanese: はんぷく, かにわたり？)	Hiroki Hayashi; Takashi Yoneoka	Yūta Sukegawa	Satoko Kishino	December 4, 2021
37	"Is This A Shellfish Move?"; Transliteration: "Kaishingeki kai?" (Japanese: かいしんげき かい？)	Hiroki Hayashi; Takashi Yoneoka	Yūta Sukegawa	Satoko Kishino	December 11, 2021
38	"Ebi, Burn!"; Transliteration: "Ebi, Nigete!" (Japanese: にげて えびさま！)	Hiroki Hayashi; Takashi Yoneoka	Yūta Sukegawa	Satoko Kishino	December 18, 2021
39	"Challenge Yokozuna!"; Transliteration: "E Idome Yokozuna!" (Japanese: よこづなへ いどめ！)	Hiroki Hayashi; Takashi Yoneoka	Yūta Sukegawa	Satoko Kishino	December 25, 2021
40	"Cast A Net On Speed!"; Transliteration: "Supīdo ni Ami o Hare!" (Japanese: スピードに あみをはれ！)	Hiroki Hayashi; Takashi Yoneoka	Yūta Sukegawa	Satoko Kishino	January 1, 2022 (Note: This episode aired at 7:55 a.m. JST, 30 minutes after the original air time on TVK.)
41	"Aspirations Become Goals!"; Transliteration: "Akogare wa ni Mokuhyō!" (Japanese: あこがれは もくひょうに！)	Takashi Yoneoka; Hiroki Hayashi	Takashi Yoneoka	Satoko Kishino	January 8, 2022
42	"Yokozuna Is Pushed Back!"; Transliteration: "Osareta Yokozuna!" (Japanese: おされた よこづな！)	Takashi Yoneoka; Hiroki Hayashi	Takashi Yoneoka	Satoko Kishino	January 15, 2022
43	"Grab It And Slam It!"; Transliteration: "Tsukan de Hasan de!" (Japanese: つかんで はさんで！)	Hiroki Hayashi; Takashi Yoneoka	Yūta Sukegawa	Satoko Kishino	January 22, 2022
44	"Cut Off! Shirasu Chain!"; Transliteration: "Tachikire! Shirasu Chēn!" (Japanese: たちきれ！ しらすチェーン！)	Hiroki Hayashi; Takashi Yoneoka	Yūta Sukegawa	Satoko Kishino	January 29, 2022
45	"Will The Protagonist Stick It Out?"; Transliteration: "Shuyaku wa Nebaru?" (Japanese: しゅやくは ねばる？)	Takashi Yoneoka; Hiroki Hayashi	Takashi Yoneoka	Satoko Kishino	February 5, 2022
46	"Destined Rivals!"; Transliteration: "Shukumei no Raibaru!" (Japanese: しゅくめいの ライバル！)	Takashi Yoneoka; Hiroki Hayashi	Takashi Yoneoka	Satoko Kishino	February 12, 2022
47	"Who's Who?"; Transliteration: "Dotchi Dotchi?" (Japanese: どっちが どっち？)	Hiroki Hayashi; Takashi Yoneoka	Yūta Sukegawa	Satoko Kishino	February 19, 2022
48	"Stop The Merry-Go-Round!"; Transliteration: "Merī-gō-rando o Tomero!" (Japanese: メリーゴーランドを とめろ！)	Tetsuya Kitagawa; Hiroki Hayashi	Tetsuya Kitagawa	Satoko Kishino	February 26, 2022
49	"Try It Out Again Next Time!"; Transliteration: "Yokozuna Dai Sharin!" (Japanese: よこづな だいしゃりん！)	Hiroki Hayashi; Takashi Yoneoka	Tetsuya Kitagawa	Satoko Kishino	March 5, 2022
50	"Best Deal! All-You-Can-Stuff!"; Transliteration: "Otoku! Tsume-hōdai!" (Japanese: おとく! つめほうだい！)	Hiroki Hayashi; Takashi Yoneoka	Yūta Sukegawa	Satoko Kishino	March 12, 2022
51	"I'm Small But Won't Lose!"; Transliteration: "Chīsakute mo Makenai!" (Japanese: ちいさくても まけない！)	Takashi Yoneoka; Hiroki Hayashi	Takashi Yoneoka	Satoko Kishino	March 19, 2022
52	"Final Sushi Festivities!"; Transliteration: "Osushi no Senshūraku!" (Japanese: おすしの せんしゅうらく！)	Hiroki Hayashi; Takashi Yoneoka	Yūta Sukegawa	Satoko Kishino	March 26, 2022

== See also ==
- Pui Pui Molcar
- Iii Icecrin
