= Iii Icecrin =

Japanese anime television series

- iii Icecrin

iiiあいすくりん (iii aisu kurin)
- Created by: Shin-Ei Animation
- Anime television series
- Directed by: Juria Matsumura
- Written by: Hiroko Fukuda
- Music by: Kenta Higashiohji
- Studio: Shin-Ei Animation; TIA
- Licensed by: SA/SEA: Medialink
- Original network: TXN (TV Tokyo) (S1); TV Tokyo (S2)
- Original run: April 6, 2021 – September 17, 2022
- Episodes: 24
- Manga
- Written by: Yuzuki-iro
- Published by: Hakusensha
- Magazine: Manga Park
- Original run: April 2021 – present

iii Icecrin (Japanese: iiiあいすくりん, Hepburn: iii aisu kurin) is a Japanese 3D CGI short anime series produced by Shin-Ei Animation and TIA in collaboration with Okinawan ice cream chain Blue Seal Ice Cream and toy company Takara Tomy. It is directed by Juria Matsumura (TsukiPro the Animation) and written by Hiroko Fukuda (Amanchu! Advance) with character designs done by Aya Matsui. It aired on TV Tokyo through its Kinder TV children's variety program from April to June 2021. A second season premiered in July 2022.

== Setting ==
iii Icecrin is a short series aired in a two-minute format with the setting of the show is a place named Ice Cream town where people socialize and meet with each other and its denizens being animals based on the 15 various flavors sold by Blue Seal Ice Cream. Each episode focuses on a certain character in the series in their everyday antics but when problems arose, they solve it through teamwork and dedication. Also as a running theme in the series, the characters can melt in hot conditions, requiring them to go to a freezer to freeze their bodies back in shape.

Each episode were narrated by Shigeo Takahashi of the comedy duo Savanna.

=== Characters ===
There are 15 main characters in the series, as depicted in the official website:

Vanillan (バニラン, Baniran)
Voiced by: Taeko Kawata
Chocon (チョコン, Chokon)
Voiced by: Fumiko Orikasa
Mamango (ママンゴ)
Voiced by: Ryota Iwasaki
Blune (ブルーン, Burūn)
Voiced by: Sayaka Senbongi
Stocchii (ストッチー, Sutotchī)
Voiced by: Konomi Kohara
Francisco Minton XV (フランシスコ・ミントン15世, Furanshisuko Minton 15-sei)
Voiced by: Marina Horiuchi
Bakkii (バッキー, Bakkī)
Voiced by: Rena Maeda
Chacha (茶々（ちゃちゃ）)
Voiced by: Mai Satou
Chicchi (ちっち)
Voiced by: Chitose Morinaga
Tirara (ティララ)
Voiced by: Maria Naganawa
Napp (ナップ, Nappu)
Voiced by: Megumi Satou
Mabubu (マブブ)
Voiced by: Hina Kino

== Media ==
=== Anime ===
iii Icecrin first aired on in TV Tokyo as one of the segments in the Children's Variety Program Kinder TV on January 5, 2021, with Takara Tomy later streaming the series on YouTube in Japan. Medialink licensed the series for both South Asia and Southeast Asia territories, and is streaming on its Ani-One YouTube channel.

On May 9, 2022, a second season was announced and premiered on July 2, 2022.

Takara Tomy later released a special dance music video of the series featuring the comedy duo Savanna. The series is also confirmed for both DVD and Blu-ray release in the future.

No.	Title	Directed by	Written by	Storyboarded by	Original release date
1	"Vanillan's Day"; Transliteration: "Baniran no Ichinichi" (Japanese: バニランの一日)	Juria Matsumura	Hiroko Fukuda	Juria Matsumura	April 6, 2021
2	"Ochoco Choi Café"; Transliteration: "Otchoko Choi Kafe" (Japanese: おっチョコちょいカフェ)	Juria Matsumura	Hiroko Fukuda	Juria Matsumura	April 13, 2021
3	"Carefree Mamango"; Transliteration: "Nonbiri Mamango" (Japanese: の～～んびりママンゴ)	Juria Matsumura	Hiroko Fukuda	Juria Matsumura	April 20, 2021
4	"Don't Praise"; Transliteration: "Homenai de" (Japanese: ほめないで)	Juria Matsumura	Hiroko Fukuda	Juria Matsumura	April 27, 2021
5	"Stotchi is Shy"; Transliteration: "Sutotchī wa Hitomishiri" (Japanese: ストッチーは人みしり)	Juria Matsumura	Hiroko Fukuda	Juria Matsumura	May 4, 2021
6	"The Birthday is a Fuss"; Transliteration: "Tanjōbi wa Ōsawagi" (Japanese: たんじょうびは大さわぎ)	Juria Matsumura	Hiroko Fukuda	Juria Matsumura	May 11, 2021
7	"I Want to Be an Adult"; Transliteration: "Otonappoku Naritai" (Japanese: おとなっぽくなりたい)	Juria Matsumura	Hiroko Fukuda	Juria Matsumura	May 18, 2021
8	"Southern Island's Icecrin"; Transliteration: "Minami no Shima no Aisukurin" (Japanese: 南の島のあいすくりん)	Juria Matsumura	Hiroko Fukuda	Juria Matsumura	June 1, 2021
9	"Crybaby Chicchi"; Transliteration: "Nakimushi Chitchi" (Japanese: 泣きむしちっち)	Juria Matsumura	Hiroko Fukuda	Juria Matsumura	June 8, 2021
10	"Tirara is a Popular Person"; Transliteration: "Tirara wa Ninkimono" (Japanese: ティララは人気者)	Juria Matsumura	Hiroko Fukuda	Juria Matsumura	June 15, 2021
11	"Find the Legendary Dragon!"; Transliteration: "Densetsu no Doragon o Sagase!" (Japanese: 伝説のドラゴンをさがせ！)	Juria Matsumura	Hiroko Fukuda	Juria Matsumura	June 22, 2021
12	"Everyone's Friends"; Transliteration: "Minna Tomodachi" (Japanese: みんなともだち)	Juria Matsumura	Hiroko Fukuda	Juria Matsumura	June 29, 2021

=== Manga ===
A 4-koma manga written and illustrated by Yuzuki-iro began serialization on Hakusensha's Manga Park app on April 6, 2021.
