= Patrick Macias =

American journalist and author

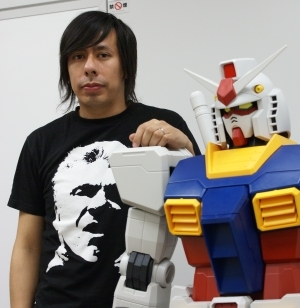
- Patrick Macias in 2007
- Born: 1972 (age 53–54); Sacramento, California, U.S.
- Occupations: Journalist; Editor-in-chief of Otaku USA; Senior Manager of New Initiatives at Crunchyroll

Patrick Macias (born 1972) is an American author and co-author of several titles on pop culture fandom, specifically relating to Japanese culture and otaku culture in America. Macias is also a correspondent for NHK World Television show Tokyo Eye, and is the editor-in-chief of the otaku culture magazine Otaku USA, which debuted on June 5, 2007. In 2014, Macias became the Senior Manager of New Initiatives at Crunchyroll, leaving the position in 2019. Macias currently works as a Creative Director at Octas, Inc.

Macias hosts the podcast "Pure TokyoScope" with co-host Matt Alt, a translator and writer. The podcast covers general topics of anime, manga and Japanese culture. In 2024, Macias published "Mondo Tokyo – Dispatches from a Secret Japan", a collection of interviews and short stories about the Tokyo underground scene.

== Biography ==
Macias became a published writer when he was 19, writing about youth culture for zines and other publications. Alvin Lu, a former editor of the San Francisco Bay Guardian, asked Macias to write for the Guardian based on Macias's early work, and this led to a regular column titled "Tiger on Beat" in which Macias covered Hong Kong movies. Lu went on to edit Tokyoscope and Pulp, and Macias likewise began writing for Pulp and became the assistant editor for Animerica.

In 2010, Macias was contracted to become the co-host of the webshow, Otaku-Verse-Zero, sponsored by Japanese internet radio station company known as K'z Station. With his co-host Yuu Asakawa, he explored anime and other Japanese sub-culture in and round Tokyo. In 2011, Macias would join Crunchyroll's web-talk show The Live Show as co-host for the show.

In 2014, Macias began writing the Paranoia Girls webcomic, "an experimental science fiction story set in the Northern California suburbs of 1985", featuring art by Japanese surrealist Yunico Uchiyama.

In 2015, Macias created the Hypersonic Music Club webcomic for Crunchyroll, featuring art by illustrator Hiroyuki Takahashi, in which cyborg DJs battle demons from another dimension.

Later in 2015, Macias began working with artist Mugi Tanaka on the Park Harajuku: Crisis Team! webcomic, conceived as a collaboration between Crunchyroll and the "otaku fashion" Park store in Harajuku, Tokyo. It was adapted into the 2017 anime series Urahara.

In 2018, he moved to Tokyo, Japan with his wife and daughter.

== Bibliography ==
- (1999) Fresh Pulp: Dispatches from the Japanese Pop Culture Front (1997-1999)
- (1999) Japan Edge: The Insider's Guide to Japanese Pop Subculture
- (2001) TokyoScope: The Japanese Cult Film Companion
- (2003) Anime Poster Art: Japan's Movie House Masterpieces
- (2004) Cruising The Anime City: An Otaku Guide To Neo Tokyo
- (2006) Otaku in USA – Love & Misunderstanding! The History of Adopted Anime in America!
- (2007) Japanese Schoolgirl Inferno: Tokyo Teen Fashion Subculture Handbook
- (2007–2014) Otaku USA Magazine
- (2024) Mondo Tokyo – Dispatches from a Secret Japan
