= Blue Seal =

Japanese ice cream chain

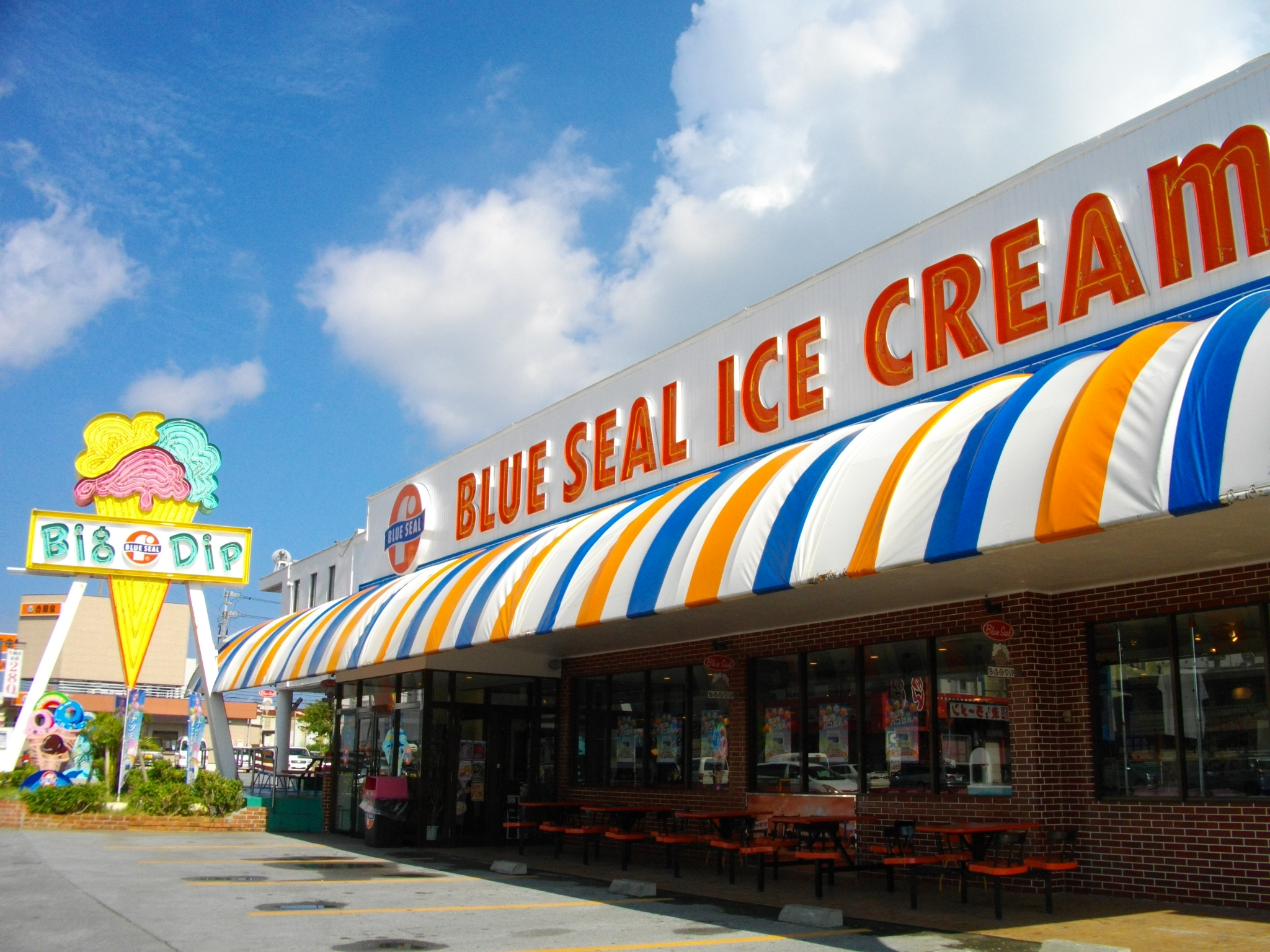
- Blue Seal's Makiminato branch in Urasoe, its first and main location
- Type: Restaurant chain
- Industry: Ice cream
- Founded: 1948; 78 years ago in Okinawa, Japan
- Headquarters: Japan
- Area served: Okinawa, Kantō, Chūbu, Kansai
- Parent: Foremost Blue Seal
- Website: Official website

Blue Seal Ice Cream is a Japanese ice cream chain operated by Foremost Blue Seal. It is particularly prevalent in Okinawa, and its slogan is "Born in America, Raised in Okinawa."

== History ==
The United States military created the ice cream for American soldiers stationed in Okinawa after the close of World War II, to boost morale and give them a familiar taste of home. Its first factory opened in 1948 on a US military base. The Blue Seal products were only offered to Americans until 1963, when the company began selling to the Okinawan public. Their flagship store in Urasoe also opened that year, which still maintains a retro American diner theme.

Later on, the company transferred to local ownership and Okinawan flavors such as beni-imo (purple sweet potato) and Goya bitter melon were introduced.

In 2009, Blue Seal opened a location in Shibuya, Tokyo, marking its first expansion into the Kanto region.
