= Sayonara, Football =

Japanese manga series

- First volume cover

さよならフットボール (Sayonara Futtobōru)
- Genre: Sports
- Manga
- Written by: Naoshi Arakawa
- Published by: Kodansha
- English publisher: NA: Kodansha USA
- Magazine: Magazine E-no
- Original run: June 20, 2009 – August 20, 2010
- Volumes: 2
- Anime film

Farewell, My Dear Cramer: First Touch
- Directed by: Seiki Takuno
- Written by: Natsuko Takahashi
- Music by: Masaru Yokoyama
- Studio: Liden Films
- Licensed by: Crunchyroll: SEA: Muse Communication
- Released: June 11, 2021
- Runtime: 104 minutes
- Other
- Farewell, My Dear Cramer (sequel)
- icon

Sayonara, Football (Japanese: さよならフットボール, Hepburn: Sayonara Futtobōru) is a Japanese manga series written and illustrated by Naoshi Arakawa. It was serialized in Kodansha's Magazine E-no from June 2009 to August 2010, and collected in two tankōbon volumes. The series is published in print and in digital in North America by Kodansha USA. A sequel, Farewell, My Dear Cramer, was published from 2016 to 2020.

An anime film adaptation of the series by Liden Films, titled Farewell, My Dear Cramer: First Touch, premiered in June 2021.

== Plot ==
Nozomi Onda, a second-year middle school student, loves soccer and possesses strong technical skill, stamina, and refined play style, but is barred from competing in official matches because she is a girl. Despite having grown up playing alongside her male teammates, Nozomi struggles with the increasing physical gap between them and watches as they advance beyond her, including her younger brother Junpei. Although her coach recognizes her talent, he refuses to let her play due to the physical demands of boys soccer. Refusing to give up, Nozomi trains harder than anyone, continuing to support and drive the team while holding onto her desire to play "beautiful soccer."

== Media ==
=== Manga ===
The series is written and illustrated by Naoshi Arakawa. It was serialized in Kodansha's Magazine E-no from June 20, 2009, to August 20, 2010. Its chapters were compiled into two tankōbon volumes.

Kodansha USA is publishing the series digitally and in print.

==== Volumes ====
No.	Original release date	Original ISBN	English release date	English ISBN
1	February 17, 2010	978-4-06-375872-6	September 15, 2020	978-1-63236-963-5
2	October 15, 2010	978-4-06-375977-8	November 24, 2020	978-1-63236-964-2

=== Film ===
An anime film adaptation of the series, titled Farewell, My Dear Cramer: First Touch (さよなら私のクラマー ファーストタッチ, Sayonara Watashi no Kuramā Fāsuto Tatchi), was announced in September 2020. The film is animated by Liden Films and directed by Seiki Takuno, with Natsuko Takahashi writing the script, and Masaru Yokoyama composing the music. It was originally set to premiere on April 1, 2021, but it was delayed to June 11, 2021. The staff said it was due to "unforeseen circumstances", but they also expressed hope of the new coronavirus getting contained. Crunchyroll streamed the film outside of Asia. In Southeast Asia, Muse Communication licensed the film.

== Reception ==
The series was nominated for the Mangawa award in the shōnen category in 2017.

Caitlin Moore from Anime News Network praised the series, praising it for its "highly technical soccer action" and treatment of gender issues in sports, while criticizing the art for faces. Koiwai and Takato from Manga News also gave the series praise, calling it "finely presented".
