= Farewell, My Dear Cramer =

Japanese manga series

- First tankōbon volume cover

さよなら私のクラマー (Sayonara Watashi no Kuramā)
- Genre: Sports
- Manga
- Written by: Naoshi Arakawa
- Published by: Kodansha
- English publisher: NA: Kodansha Comics
- Magazine: Monthly Shōnen Magazine
- Original run: May 6, 2016 – December 4, 2020
- Volumes: 14
- Anime television series
- Directed by: Seiki Takuno
- Written by: Natsuko Takahashi
- Music by: Masaru Yokoyama
- Studio: Liden Films
- Licensed by: Crunchyroll: SEA: Muse Communication
- Original network: Tokyo MX, BS NTV, AT-X, KBC
- Original run: April 4, 2021 – June 27, 2021
- Episodes: 13
- Preceded by
- Sayonara, Football (2009–2010)
- icon

Farewell, My Dear Cramer (Japanese: さよなら私のクラマー, Hepburn: Sayonara Watashi no Kuramā) is a Japanese manga series by Naoshi Arakawa about women's association football. The manga serves as a sequel to Arakawa's 2009 work, Sayonara, Football. The series was serialized in Kodansha's Monthly Shōnen Magazine from May 2016 to December 2020, with the individual chapters were collected in fourteen tankōbon volumes. The series is published in print and in digital in North America by Kodansha Comics. An anime television series adaptation of the series by Liden Films aired from April to June 2021.

== Plot ==
Sumire Suō and Midori Soshizaki are the stars of their respective middle school girls' soccer teams. As they graduate to high school, they end up joining an eclectic cast of other new girls at Warabi Seinan High School, with hopes of taking the school's normally poor-performing team to the top. With the help of former Nadeshiko Japan player Naoko Nōmi as their new coach, they must find a way to defeat powerful new enemies ranging from other nationally ranked school soccer teams, to their own school's administration.

== Characters ==
=== Warabi Seinan High School ===
==== Girls' Soccer Club ====
Nozomi Onda (恩田 希, Onda Nozomi)
Voiced by: Miyuri Shimabukuro
A skilled girl who played on boys' soccer teams for several years (as the main protagonist of Sayonara, Football), thinking the overall level of competition of girls' soccer teams was beneath her, until her middle-school coach convinced her to join a women's team in high school. Despite putting in little effort in practice, Nozomi is an incredibly skilled attacker who tries to stay motivated no matter the opponent.
Sawa Echizen (越前 佐和, Echizen Sawa)
Voiced by: Shion Wakayama
The manager of the Warabi girls' team who tries to support them from the sidelines with everything from video analysis to nutrition.
Sumire Suō (周防 すみれ, Suō Sumire)
Voiced by: Tomoyo Kurosawa
The captain of her middle school team despite said team winning very few matches. An incredibly fast player with little patience for the eccentricities of her teammates. She decided to join Warabi after seeing Eriko's effort during a losing match and finding a kindred spirit with her.
Midori Soshizaki (曽志崎 緑, Soshizaki Midori)
Voiced by: Aoi Yūki
Sumire's friend and rival throughout middle school who played on a different team, Midori decided to follow Sumire to Warabi so she would not play alone. A newspaper article calls her the #3 defensive midfielder in the nation.
Aya Shiratori (白鳥 綾, Shiratori Aya)
Voiced by: Shiho Kokido
An arrogant prima donna who seems to model herself after Mario Balotelli, a striker who plays incredibly close to the offside line to get scoring chances but makes multiple mistakes that frustrate her teammates.
Eriko Tase (田勢 恵梨子, Tase Eriko)
Voiced by: Yū Shimamura
The Captain of the Warabi Seinan girls' soccer team who struggles to keep the team together when several players leave after the team's poor performance last year. A second-year student who plays on the right wing.
Makoto Miyasaka (宮坂 真琴, Miyasaka Makoto)
Voiced by: Marina Yamada
Rui Kikuchi (菊池 類, Kikuchi Rui)
Voiced by: Rena Maeda
Ayumu Kishi (岸 歩, Kishi Ayumu)
Voiced by: Azumi Waki
Saori Komurasaki (小紫 沙織, Komurasaki Saori)
Voiced by: Misano Sakai
Noriko Okachimachi (御徒町 紀子, Okachimachi Noriko)
Voiced by: Anzu Haruno
Karina Kakogawa (加古川 香梨奈, Kakogawa Karina)
Voiced by: Rena Hasegawa
Naoko Nōmi (能見 奈緒子, Nōmi Naoko)
Voiced by: Yūko Kaida
The former Nadeshiko Japan player and World Cup champion who was distraught at the decline of women's soccer throughout the nation. Naoko returns to her alma mater at Warabi to act as the new coach of the women's soccer team.
Gōro Fukatsu (深津 吾朗, Fukatsu Gōro)
Voiced by: Junichi Suwabe
The incumbent coach of the Warabi women's soccer team who seems apathetic to their performance, spending more time burying his head in a horse racing magazine than paying attention to the team.

==== Boys' Soccer Club ====
Tetsuji Yamada (山田 鉄二, Yamada Tetsuji)
Voiced by: Koki Uchiyama
Kaoru Takei (竹井 薫, Takei Kaoru)
Voiced by: Ryōta Ōsaka
Yasuaki Tani (谷 安昭, Tani Yasuaki)
Voiced by: Shimba Tsuchiya
Eiken Asuka (飛鳥 永建, Asuka Eiken)
Voiced by: Takaya Kuroda

=== Fuji Daiichi Junior High School ===
Junpei Onda (恩田 順平, Onda Junpei)
Voiced by: Ryoko Shiraishi
Kōzō Samejima (鮫島 幸造, Samejima Kōzō)
Voiced by: Kōji Yusa

=== Kunogi Gakuen High School ===
Mizuki Kaji (梶 みずき, Kaji Mizuki)
Voiced by: Saori Hayami
Captain of the Kunogi girls' team who normally plays at center-forward, she has a short temper and shows little tolerance for slackers on her team. However, when her crush Ōshio Kohei is nearby, her personality flips, which Sumire used as leverage to make her join their team for the futsal tournament.
Haruna Itō (井藤 春名, Itō Haruna)
Voiced by: Yui Ishikawa
An attacking midfielder and gifted technical player for the Kunogi girls' team. After a practice match against Warabi, she became infatuated with Nozomi's playstyle and quickly agreed to team up with her during the futsal tournament.
Mao Tsukuda (佃 真央, Tsukada Mao)
Voiced by: Makoto Koichi
Kenroku Washizu (鷲巣 兼六, Washizu Kenroku)
Voiced by: Kazuhiro Yamaji

=== Urawa Hosei High School ===
Chika Kirishima (桐島 千花, Kirishima Chika)
Voiced by: Yui Makino
The ace of Urawa Hosei playing in the role of midfielder, key to the catenaccio tactic played by her team. During middle school was in the same team of Soshizaki and resent her for joining a rival team in high school.
Yū Tenma (天馬 夕, Tenma Yū)
Voiced by: Aika Kobayashi
Alice Adatara (安達太良 アリス, Adatara Arisu)
Voiced by: Hiroko Kiso
Kei Hanabusa (花房 圭, Hanabusa Kei)
Voiced by: Nichika Ōmori
Nanami Zaisen (財前 奈々美, Zaizen Nanami)
Voiced by: Mikako Komatsu
Masahiro Gotōda (後藤田 正弘, Gotōda Masahiro)
Voiced by: Show Hayami

=== Korenkan High School ===
Rei Kutani (九谷 怜, Kutani Rei)
Voiced by: Yumi Uchiyama
A physical defender who was jealous of Haruna's talent while being her teammate in middle school, Rei decided to focus on using her body instead of technical skill.

== Media ==
=== Manga ===
Written and illustrated by Naoshi Arakawa, Farewell, My Dear Cramer was serialized in Kodansha's shōnen manga magazine Monthly Shōnen Magazine from May 6, 2016, to December 4, 2020. The title refers to German footballer and manager Dettmar Cramer. Kodansha has compiled its chapters into fourteen tankōbon volumes. The first volume was published on August 17, 2016, and the last on April 1, 2021.

The manga has been simultaneously released in English on Kindle and Comixology. Crunchyroll published the manga starting in 2018. In July 2019, Kodansha Comics announced the print release of the manga. The first volume was released on January 26, 2021, and last on March 28, 2023.

==== Volumes ====
No.	Original release date	Original ISBN	English release date	English ISBN
1	August 17, 2016	978-4-06-392539-5	January 26, 2021	978-1-63236-965-9
2	January 17, 2017	978-4-06-392561-6	March 30, 2021	978-1-63236-985-7
3	June 16, 2017	978-4-06-392581-4	May 25, 2021	978-1-64651-099-3
4	October 17, 2017	978-4-06-392599-9	June 26, 2021	978-1-64651-100-6
5	February 16, 2018	978-4-06-510882-6	August 24, 2021	978-1-64651-101-3
6	June 15, 2018	978-4-06-511705-7	February 8, 2022	978-1-64651-102-0
7	October 17, 2018	978-4-06-513751-2	April 26, 2022	978-1-64651-103-7
8	February 15, 2019	978-4-06-514619-4	May 10, 2022	978-1-64651-104-4
9	June 17, 2019	978-4-06-516098-5	June 14, 2022	978-1-64651-105-1
10	October 17, 2019	978-4-06-517369-5	July 26, 2022	978-1-64651-429-8
11	February 17, 2020	978-4-06-518543-8	September 27, 2022	978-1-64651-592-9
12	June 17, 2020	978-4-06-519685-4	December 13, 2022	978-1-64651-593-6
13	October 16, 2020	978-4-06-521042-0	January 31, 2023	978-1-64651-594-3
14	April 1, 2021	978-4-06-522990-3	March 28, 2023	978-1-64651-719-0

=== Anime ===
An anime television series adaptation was announced in the October issue of Monthly Shōnen Magazine on September 4, 2020. The series is animated by Liden Films and directed by Seiki Takuno, with Natsuko Takahashi handling series composition, and Masaru Yokoyama composing the music. It aired from April 4 to June 27, 2021, on Tokyo MX. Aika Kobayashi performed the series' opening theme song "Ambitious Goal", while Mikako Komatsu performed the series' ending theme song "Kuyashii koto wa Kettobase". Crunchyroll streamed the series worldwide outside of Asia. In Southeast Asia, Muse Communication licensed the series.

==== Episodes ====
No.	Title	Directed by (Note: Information is taken from the ending credits of each episode.)	Written by	Original release date
1	"Everyone"; Transliteration: "Minna" (Japanese: みんな)	Yasushi Muroya; Akira Ishii (soccer)	Natsuko Takahashi	April 4, 2021
After spending her middle school days playing with the boys' soccer team, Nozomi's teacher convinces her to try playing on a girls' soccer team. Meanwhile, Sumire sees her own middle school career coming to an end, and her rival Midori declares that she'll join whatever school or club team Sumire picks. Sumire and Midori go to watch a practice match with Warabi Seinan. Even though Warabi gets blown out, Sumire finds herself drawn to Eriko Tase, and decides to play on the same team as her at Warabi. Later, after introductions, the girls all play an intra-squad scrimmage against each other. Sumire, Midori, and Eriko all end up on the same team, and manage to win the scrimmage, with the winning goal scored by a haughty girl named Aya. Afterwards, the former Japan women's national football team player Naoko Nōmi returns to Warabi to coach the girls' soccer team.
2	"Impact"; Transliteration: "Inpakuto" (Japanese: インパクト)	Kazuya Fujishiro	Rinrin	April 11, 2021
After introducing herself to the team, Naoko begins training the girls, but keeps punishing them with push-ups as she watches Nozomi putting no effort into practice. Shortly after practice, Naoko treats the team to her family's okonomiyaki, with an announcement that she set up a friendly match against the powerful Kunogi women's soccer team. When the matchday arrives, Kunogi plays a possession style and neutralizes Sumire on the field. Kunogi's coach later notes that Warabi is "parking the bus" against them, but it doesn't matter as Kunogi still scores several goals while barely letting Warabi out of their half of the field. Goro, the previous Warabi coach, asks Naoko what the point is of putting Warabi up against such powerful competition. Naoko responds that this game is a test of character, to see how the team will respond to adversity in the future.
3	"Gates of Hell"; Transliteration: "Jigoku no Mon" (Japanese: 地獄の門)	Akira Ishii	Yoshiki Ōkusa	April 18, 2021
The Kunogi team pours on the goals, taking seriously their coach's threat to keep them in reserve if they don't win with at least 10 goals and a clean sheet. While Sumire has all but given up on the match, Nozomi finds the competition exciting, and manages to rally the morale of her teammates to score at least one goal against Kunogi, though some poor decision-making by Aya frustrates Nozomi and her teammates. Sumire decides to get her head back in the game to spite the opposing right-back, and manages to get the ball to Nozomi, who ruins Kunogi's shutout in the dying seconds of the match.
4	"Frontier"; Transliteration: "Furontia" (Japanese: フロンティア)	Masahiko Watanabe	Yoshiki Ōkusa	April 25, 2021
Nozomi's goal is waved off by a foul Aya committed on the Kunogi goalkeeper, though her Marseille turn impresses the coaches on both sides. The next day, after getting constant reminders of the team's 21-0 beatdown, Nozomi demands her coaches help with getting new members and better training. Sawa organizes a team-wide cooking group, hoping her nutritional science studies can help build up the team's endurance, though few of the girls have the skills to cook properly. Sawa and a few of the girls try to give pots of their food to the boys' soccer team, but they are blocked by the boys' soccer coach, who then claims they will be taking over the girls' field as well for practice. Meanwhile, Naoko reveals she has bought new uniforms for the girls' soccer team and thrown the old ones out, though her custom design shocks the girls' team.
5	"Lovesickness"; Transliteration: "Koiwazurai" (Japanese: 恋わずらい)	Fumiaki Usui	Natsuko Takahashi	May 2, 2021
The Warabi Principal is intimidated by the boys' soccer coach into giving them the girls' practice field, though he does give the girls team an alternate site farther away from the school. In addition, most of the girls' team agree that their coach's custom uniform design is hideous, but don't have the money to buy new ones. The girls' soccer team splits into two groups: Eriko and three of her teammates try to stalk the boys coach to gain leverage on him. The rest of the team follows Midori to Tobitakyū Station to enter a futsal tournament with a large gift certificate to a sporting goods store as the prize, but are one short of the minimum team size after Aya accidentally guides her senior teammates onto a wrong train. With time running out to register, the four Warabis who did show up -- Nozomi, Sumire, Sawa, and Midori -- end up bargaining with Mizuki and Haruna from the Kunogi girls team to join their team for the tournament.
6	"Those Who Chase and Those Who Are Chased"; Transliteration: "Ou Mono, Owareru Mono" (Japanese: 追う者、追われる者)	Sōta Yokote	Rinrin	May 9, 2021
Eriko's squad tries multiple attempts to blackmail the boys soccer coach into letting the girls team practice with his team, but their attempts backfire. Meanwhile, the mixed team of Warabi and Kunogi girls at the futsal pitch work their way up to the finals, where they face off against a team led by Rei Kutani, Haruna's former teammate in middle school who lacked technical talent and instead put all her efforts into being a physical soccer player. Despite Nozomi's attempts at goading her, Rei manages to score the winning goal. The Warabi girls take home the second prize of 30,000 Yen, and decide to work part-time jobs to make up the rest of the funds for new kits. Later, Gōro blackmails the boys coach into letting the girls team play occasional scrimmages with the boys, and the girls team jog to their new practice ground outside the school.
7	"The Rapidly Advancing Team"; Transliteration: "Yakushin no Chīmu" (Japanese: 躍進のチーム)	Yasushi Muroya	Rinrin	May 16, 2021
With their new kits acquired, the Warabis play their first official match against the Asuka Trade women's team. However, Nozomi gets too excited during the days leading up to the match, and plays while sleep-deprived, accidentally scoring the game-winning goal for Asuka with a diving header on her own team's net. Naoko punishes Nozomi by banishing her to the bench for the next game. The next day, Naoko gets Goro to bargain with the boys soccer coach to borrow a few boys for an intra-squad scrimmage, to help the Warabis practice against a physical opponent. During practice, Naoko and Goro argue over coaching styles, while Nozomi practices on a goal despite being benched for the next game.
8	"Pursued By the Past"; Transliteration: "Oikakete Kuru kako" (Japanese: 追いかけてくる過去)	Fumiaki Usui; Chihaya Tanaka	Natsuko Takahashi	May 23, 2021
While playing softball in PE class, Nozomi gets angry at Aya and kicks one of her pitches past her head, injuring her own foot. During the Warabis third group match against Kotesashi Seirin, Nozomi tries to hide her injury from the coach, but Goro notices her downgraded play and gives her one more chance before subbing her out. Nozomi responds by sending a through ball to Aya for the winning goal. Later, as the girls head to practice, they tie up a suspected stalker who turns out to be Kazuo Takahagi, a former pro soccer player. Kazuo tells the girls that Goro was considered the "Japanese Xavi" when he met him at a U-18 camp, but a few years later, Goro badly injured his right leg and never regained his form, so he decided to become a coach instead. However, his first coaching gig on a pro Japanese team fell apart when his radical changes upset the rest of the team and he was soon forced to resign. Later, the girls from Urawa Hosei notice that they will play Warabi Seinan in the first round of the national tournament.
9	"The Red Army"; Transliteration: "Aka no Gundan" (Japanese: 赤の軍団)	Masahiko Watanabe	Yoshiki Ōkusa	May 30, 2021
The girls from Urawa Hosei prepare for their upcoming match against Warabi Seinan, discussing the important players they will face. Meanwhile, the Warabis practice as Sumire, Nozomi, and Aya argue which one of them really deserves a pass from Midori. On the day of the match, the two teams arrive at a rainy stadium. Nozomi flashes back to when she took her brother Junpei's place on the field in disguise during the boys' newbie game last year. Naoko is hit on by the coach of Urawa, but some of Urawa's team chase him off as they adore her. As the two teams walk out to the pitch, they discover that Urawa has brought their own cheering section, which dampens the morale of the Warabis as Eriko struggles to think of a pregame cheer. Finally, the match starts.
10	"Wounded Champions"; Transliteration: "Kizu-darake no Ōja" (Japanese: 傷だらけの王者)	Masahiko Watanabe	Yoshiki Ōkusa	June 6, 2021
As the first half of the match begins, the Urawa Hosei girls try to neutralize Midori, as they realize she is key to getting the ball to Warabi's forwards. However, Naoko planned for this, and encouraged Midori to pass backwards until the team finds an opening. The Warabis attempt to pull off a counterattack against Urawa's high press, but Chika Kirishima tracks back on defense and clears the ball. Goro recognizes Urawa's coach trying to copy Antonio Conte, playing a Catenaccio style that emphasizes the wing-backs with the speed to switch between offense and defense as needed. Chika gets into an argument with several Warabi players over who deserves to advance and play against the Kunogi girls team, as Urawa lost 3-1 to them last year and Chika felt responsible for the loss. The first half ends with Midori diving into the box and clearing a shot away from goal, keeping the game scoreless. Goro and Nozomi try to strategize a way to break through Urawa's tactics at halftime.
11	"The One Running Beside Us"; Transliteration: "Tonari o Hashiru Hito" (Japanese: 隣を走る人)	Kazuya Fujishiro	Rinrin	June 13, 2021
Goro instructs Nozomi to "destroy" Chika, hoping that by forcing Chika to focus on Nozomi she'll be too busy to defend elsewhere. As the second half kicks off, the rain has completely soaked the pitch, making it difficult to dribble through. Nozomi gets around this issue by constantly juggling the ball like Dragan Stojković, and manages to get a shot off, though it just misses the post. Both Sawa and the Warabi boys in attendance note that Nozomi has a way of inspiring her teammates, even back when she was a member of the boys team. Meanwhile, Urawa's coach struggles to find a way to free up Chika, thinking that no one else can effectively cover Nozomi.
12	"Ambition and Choices"; Transliteration: "Yashin to Sentaku" (Japanese: 野心と選択)	Akira Ishii	Natsuko Takahashi	June 20, 2021
With Chika and others on Urawa focusing on Nozomi, the rest of the Warabis support her as they try to drive to the enemy goal. However, Alice Adatara leads Urawa on a quick counter as she swipes the ball from Nozomi and scores on the other end of the field with her teammate Yuu Tenma's help. With Alice having free rein to roam around the field and Yuu acting as a false nine, Urawa suddenly goes up 2-0 over Warabi in the second half. Though things look bleak, Eriko slaps Nozomi and gets the rest of her team motivated to play to the final whistle.
13	"Those Who Form the Backbone"; Transliteration: "Konkan o Nasu Mono" (Japanese: 根幹をなすもの)	Tetsuya Watanabe; Norikazu Ishigooka	Natsuko Takahashi	June 27, 2021
The ref signals the end of the match and Urawa Hosei wins, 2-0. Yuu and Chika demand that Nozomi, Sumire, and Midori join their club team, as their talents are being wasted with Warabi. However, Nozomi rejects their offer, swearing to work with the Warabis to get stronger and come back next season. The next day, Warabi's coaches give the team the day off, but Goro spots Nozomi practicing anyway by the training ground, lamenting the pressure of having to carry all of women's soccer in the country instead of just having fun. Meanwhile, Midori runs into the Urawa girls at the bookstore, but Midori reiterates Nozomi's argument that she wants to build her own strong team at Warabi. Soon, the rest of the Warabi team joins Nozomi at the training ground. Elsewhere, Naoko and Kenroku talk about growing as soccer coaches. Several days later, Sawa joins the team as a defender, Goro spends time teaching the team new tactics, and Naoko enters the team in a Tokyo-based tournament.
