= Naoshi Arakawa =

Japanese manga artist

Naoshi Arakawa 新川 直司
- Area: Manga artist
- Notable works: Your Lie in April
- Awards: 37th Kodansha Manga Award for Best Shōnen Manga with Your Lie in April

Naoshi Arakawa (Japanese: 新川 直司, Hepburn: Arakawa Naoshi) is a Japanese manga artist, known for his work Your Lie in April.

== Early life ==
Naoshi Arakawa grew up in the countryside of Japan with an older brother. They used to get manga magazines like Weekly Shōnen Jump and Monthly Shōnen Magazine often, so he was exposed to manga from a young age. That, along with his love for Fist of the North Star and Kinnikuman was what ultimately made him decide to become a manga author. However, he elected not to tell anyone due to the conservative nature of his hometown and his shy personality.

== Career ==
After getting advice from a friend at college, Naoshi Arakawa decided to enter for the Monthly Shōnen Magazine Grand Challenge. The one-shot he submitted would become the basis for Your Lie in April. Afterwards, he then worked as an assistant before making his serial debut with the manga adaptation of A School Frozen in Time. It ran in Monthly Shōnen Magazine from December 2007 to April 2009, and was published in four volumes. At the time, he was also working on a one-shot manga prototype, which would eventually become his second serial, Sayonara, Football. It ran in Magazine E-no from June 20, 2009, to August 20, 2010, and was published in two volumes.

After finishing Sayonara, Football, he wanted to try something new. He eventually decided on doing a music-focused anime, however, his first attempt was turned down. To find inspiration, he decided to go back to the original one-shot he entered in the contest. He eventually created Your Lie in April. It ran in Monthly Shōnen Magazine from April 6, 2011, to February 6, 2015, and was published in eleven volumes. It won the award for Best Shōnen manga at the 37th Kodansha Manga Awards. He also made a spinoff manga for the Japanese blu-ray release of the anime adaptation and was later published in tankōbon format. He also did the illustrations for the light novel spinoff. Around this time, he also did an illustration for the endcard (the drawing at the end of the episode) for the fifth episode of Occultic;Nine.

For his next series, he decided to make a sequel to Sayonara, Football in the form of Farewell, My Dear Cramer. It ran in Monthly Shōnen Magazine from May 6, 2016, to December 4, 2020, and is being published in volumes, with fourteen having been released as of August 2022 (last release April 2021). A volume zero to Farewell, My Dear Cramer was also given out to people who saw the movie adaptation of Sayonara, Football in theaters.

On September 21, 2022, Arakawa released a preview for his new manga series, titled Atwight Game, in Kodansha's Weekly Shōnen Magazine. It was serialized from September 28, 2022, to April 12, 2023.

Arakawa's next series, Orion's Board, began serialization in Weekly Shōnen Magazine on January 10, 2024.

== Works ==
=== Manga ===
- A School Frozen in Time (冷たい校舎の時は止まる, Tsumetai Kōsha no Toki wa Tomaru) (2007–2009) (serialized in Monthly Shōnen Magazine)
- Sayonara, Football (さよならフットボール) (2009–2010) (serialized in Magazine E-no)
- Your Lie in April (四月は君の嘘, Shigatsu wa Kimi no Uso) (2011–2015) (serialized in Monthly Shōnen Magazine)
- Shigatsu wa Kimi no Uso: Coda (四月は君の嘘Ｃｏｄａ) (2016) (included with the Japanese Blu-ray release of the main series' anime adaptation)
- Farewell, My Dear Cramer (さよなら私のクラマー, Sayonara Watashi no Kuramā) (2016–2020) (serialized in Monthly Shōnen Magazine)
- Atwight Game (アトワイトゲーム) (2022–2023) (serialized in Weekly Shōnen Magazine)
- Orion's Board (盤上のオリオン, Banjō no Orion) (2024–present) (serialized in Weekly Shōnen Magazine)

=== Other ===
- Your Lie in April – A Six Person Etude (四月は君の嘘 ６人のエチュード) (2014) (illustrations)
- Occultic;Nine (オカルティック・ナイン, Okarutikku Nain) (2016) (episode 5 endcard)
