= Encourage Films =

Japanese animation studio

Kachigarasu Co., Ltd.
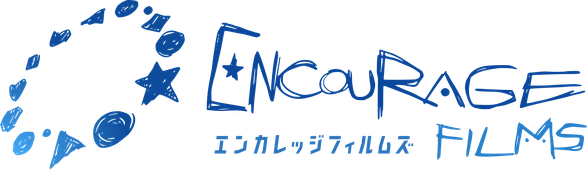
- Native name: 株式会社鵲
- Romanized name: Kabushiki-gaisha Kachigarasu
- Formerly: Encourage Films Co., Ltd. (2008-2024)
- Type: Kabushiki gaisha
- Industry: Japanese animation
- Founded: August 5, 2008; 18 years ago
- Founder: Tōyō Ikeda; Fumitoshi Oizaki
- Headquarters: 3-23-16 Sekimachikita, Nerima, Tokyo, Japan
- Key people: Fumitoshi Oizaki (Chairman)
- Total equity: ¥ 5,000,000
- Number of employees: 7
- Website: www.encouragefilms.com

Kachigarasu Co., Ltd. (Japanese: 株式会社鵲, Hepburn: Kabushiki-gaisha Kachigarasu), previously known as Encourage Films Co., Ltd. (株式会社エンカレッジフィルムズ, Kabushiki-gaisha Enkarejji Firumuzu) is a Japanese animation studio founded by ex-Gonzo producer Tōyō Ikeda and anime director Fumitoshi Oizaki on August 5, 2008. The studio is based in Nerima, Tokyo.

== Works ==
=== Television series ===
Title	Director(s)	First run start date	First run end date	Eps	Note(s)	Ref(s)
Senki Zesshō Symphogear	Tatsufumi Itō	January 6, 2012	March 30, 2012	13	Original work. (Note: During the broadcast release of the series, Encourage Films was originally credited with アニメーション制作 (Animation Work) for the first two episodes of the series, and thereafter credited as アニメーション企画 (Animation Planning). In the Blu-Ray release, however, Encourage Films is solely credited as Animation Planning for the season.)	
Etotama	Fumitoshi Oizaki	April 9, 2015	June 25, 2015	12	Original work. Co-produced with Shirogumi.	
Love Kome: We Love Rice	Yuta Yamazaki	April 5, 2017	June 21, 2017	12	Original work.	
Hitorijime My Hero	Yukina Hiiro	July 8, 2017	September 23, 2017	12	Adaptation of the manga series by Memeco Arii.	
Love Kome: We Love Rice 2	Yuta Yamazaki	October 5, 2017	December 21, 2017	12	Sequel to Love Kome: We Love Rice.	
Merc Storia: The Apathetic Boy and the Girl in a Bottle	Fumitoshi Oizaki	October 11, 2018	December 27, 2018	12	Based on the Merc Storia video game by Happy Elements.	
Isekai Cheat Magician	Daisuke Tsukushi	July 10, 2019	September 25, 2019	12	Adaptation of the light novel series by Takeru Uchida.	
Is the Order a Rabbit? BLOOM	Hiroyuki Hashimoto	October 10, 2020	December 26, 2020	12	Sequel to Is the Order a Rabbit??.	
Deaimon	Fumitoshi Oizaki	April 6, 2022	June 22, 2022	12	Adaptation of the manga series by Rin Asano.	
Chillin' in My 30s After Getting Fired from the Demon King's Army	Fumitoshi Oizaki	January 7, 2023	March 25, 2023	12	Adaptation of the light novel series by Rokujūyon Okazawa.	
The Gorilla God's Go-To Girl	Fumitoshi Oizaki	April 6, 2025	June 22, 2025	12	Adaptation of the web novel series by Shirohi. (Note: First show to be credited under the Kachigarasu name.)	

=== Original net animations ===
Title	Director(s)	First run start date	First run end date	Eps	Note(s)	Ref(s)
Ontama!	Fumitoshi Oizaki	August 7, 2009	November 6, 2009	5	Adaptation of the manga series by Noboru Maeda and Dan Yoshii.	
Miyakawa-ke no Kūfuku	Yutaka Yamamoto	April 29, 2013	July 1, 2013	10	Spin-off of Lucky Star. Co-produced with Ordet.	
Girl Friend Note	Daisuke Tsukushi	October 14, 2016	October 21, 2016	3	Based on a video game by CyberAgent.	
Etotama ~Nyan-Kyaku Banrai~	Fumitoshi Oizaki	May 25, 2021	—N/a	1	Based on a manga written by Takashi Hoshi and Tōru Zekū. Co-produced with Shirogumi.	
Akuma-kun	Junichi Sato; Fumitoshi Oizaki	November 9, 2023	—N/a	12	Based on a manga written by Shigeru Mizuki. Produced by Toei Animation.	

=== Original video animations ===
Title	Director(s)	First run start date	First run end date	Eps	Note(s)	Ref(s)
Zetsumetsu Kigu Shōjo Amazing Twins	Junichi Sato	February 26, 2014	June 25, 2014	2	Original work.	
Isekai Cheat Magician	Daisuke Tsukushi	July 5, 2021	—N/a	1		
