= Merc Storia =

Japanese mobile video game & anime series

メルクストーリア (Meruku Sutōria)
- Video game

Merc Storia: Yujutsushi to Suzu no Shirabe
- Developer: Happy Elements
- Publisher: Happy Elements
- Platform: Android, iOS
- Released: JP: 31st January 2014
- Anime television series

Merc Storia: The Apathetic Boy and the Girl in a Bottle
- Directed by: Fumitoshi Oizaki
- Written by: Fumitoshi Oizaki; Hiroki Uchida; Hitomi Amamiya
- Music by: Yamato Kasai; Mizuki Kamada
- Studio: Encourage Films
- Original network: AT-X, Tokyo MX, KBS, BS11
- Original run: October 11, 2018 – December 27, 2018
- Episodes: 12

Merc Storia: Yujutsushi to Suzu no Shirabe (メルクストーリア - 癒術士と鈴のしらべ -, Meruku Sutōria: Yujutsushi to Suzu no Shirabe; Merc Storia-The Healer and the Bell Search) was an online free-to-play fantasy role-playing game created by Happy Elements. It was released in Japan in 2014 for Android and iOS devices. The game was renamed Merc Storia: Yujutsushi to Kane no Neiro (メルクストーリア - 癒術士と鐘の音色 -) in 2018. Its main story concluded on January 31, 2025, and the service ended on February 27, 2025; a free offline memorial app was released in its place. An anime adaptation by Encourage Films, Merc Storia: Mukiryoku no Shōnen to Bin no Naka no Shōjo (メルクストーリア-無気力少年と瓶の中の少女-, Merc Storia: The Apathetic Boy and the Girl in a Bottle) aired from October 11 to December 27, 2018.

== Plot ==
After Yuu, a healer who can heal the hearts of monsters, receives a bottle from his father as a gift, he meets Merc and embarks on a journey with her across the land to uncover her past and memories.

== Characters ==
Yū (ユウ)
Voiced by: Mutsumi Tamura
A healer with the ability to heal the hearts of monsters, who embarks on a journey with Merc to uncover her past. Despite his fear of monsters, he grows over the course of the journey.
Merc (メルク, Meruku)
Voiced by: Inori Minase
A mysterious girl who resides in the bottle Merc received, whose desire to learn who she is starts their journey.
Toto (トト)
Voiced by: Yumiri Hanamori
A monster who travels with Yuu and Merc.
Jamo (ジャモ)
Voiced by: Chō
A traveling merchant.
Princess Sarodia (サローディア)
Voiced by: Honoka Inoue
The princess of Spring Hill.
Queen Floreida (フロイレイダ, Furoireida)
Voiced by: Kikuko Inoue
The queen of Spring Hill.

== Media ==
=== Anime ===
An anime adaptation by Encourage Films, Merc Storia: Mukiryoku no Shōnen to Bin no Naka no Shōjo (メルクストーリア-無気力少年と瓶の中の少女-, Merc Storia: The Apathetic Boy and the Girl in a Bottle) aired from October 11 to December 27, 2018, on AT-X and other channels for 12 episodes. The opening theme is "Origin" (オリジン, Orijin) performed by Mili. Crunchyroll streamed the series, with Ponimu simulcasting it in Indonesia.

No.	Title (Note: All English titles are taken from Crunchyroll.)	Written by	Original release date
1	"The Apathetic Boy and the Girl in a Bottle"; Transliteration: "Mukiryoku no Shōnen to Bin no Naka no Shōjo" (Japanese: 無気力少年と瓶の中の少女)	Deko Akao	October 11, 2018
2	"The King of Dawn and the Imprisoned Bride"; Transliteration: "Yoake no ō to toraware no hanayome" (Japanese: 夜明けの王と囚われの花嫁)	Hiroki Uchida	October 18, 2018
3	"The Tomboy Fairy and the Spring-Eating Dragon (Part 1)"; Transliteration: "O tenba yōsei to haru o taberu ryū (zenpen)" (Japanese: おてんば妖精と春を食べる竜 (前編))	Hitomi Amamiya	October 25, 2018
4	"The Tomboy Fairy and the Spring-Eating Dragon (Part 2)"; Transliteration: "O tenba yōsei to haru o taberu ryū (kōhen)" (Japanese: おてんば妖精と春を食べる竜 (後編))	Hitomi Amamiya	November 1, 2018
5	"The Red Star of Evil and the Brilliant Ruler of Superior Flame"; Transliteration: "Akaki magatsuboshi to Yūen no Kōsō" (Japanese: 紅き禍つ星と優焔の煌宗)	Hiroki Uchida	November 8, 2018
6	"The Lord with You in Dreams and the Town of Oblivion (Part 1)"; Transliteration: "Yume Zoi no Kimi to Bōkyaku no Machi (Zenpen)" (Japanese: 夢添いの君と忘却の町 (前編))	Hiroki Uchida	November 15, 2018
7	"The Lord with You in Dreams and the Town of Oblivion (Part 2)"; Transliteration: "Yume Zoi no Kimi to Bōkyaku no Machi (kōhen)" (Japanese: 夢添いの君と忘却の町 (後編))	Hiroki Uchida	November 22, 2018
8	"The King of the Song Altar and the Diva in a Cage (Part 1)"; Transliteration: "Kagakudan no ō to Torikago no Dīva (Zenpen)" (Japanese: 歌楽壇の王と鳥籠のディーヴァ (前編))	Hitomi Amamiya	November 29, 2018
9	"The King of the Song Altar and the Diva in a Cage (Part 2)"; Transliteration: "Kagakudan no ō to Torikago no Dīva (kōhen)" (Japanese: 歌楽壇の王と鳥籠のディーヴァ (後編))	Hitomi Amamiya	December 6, 2018
10	"The Angel Who Couldn`t Fly and the Holy Wings of Ten Thousand Prayers (Part 1)"; Transliteration: "Tobenai Tenshi to Banki no Seiyoku (Zenpen)" (Japanese: 飛べない天使と万祈の聖翼 (前編))	Hiroki Uchida	December 13, 2018
11	"The Angel Who Couldn`t Fly and the Holy Wings of Ten Thousand Prayers (Part 2)"; Transliteration: "Tobenai Tenshi to Banki no Seiyoku (kōhen)" (Japanese: 飛べない天使と万祈の聖翼 (後編))	Hiroki Uchida	December 20, 2018
12	"The Healer and the Friend in a Bottle"; Transliteration: "Ie jutsushi to Bin no Naka no Yūjin" (Japanese: 癒術士と瓶の中の友人)	Hiroki Uchida	December 27, 2018
