= Hitorijime My Hero =

Japanese manga series

- Cover of Hitorijime My Hero volume 1 by Ichijinsha

ひとりじめマイヒーロー (Hitoriji me Maihīrō)
- Genre: Romance, Yaoi
- Manga
- Written by: Memeco Arii
- Published by: Ichijinsha
- English publisher: NA: Kodansha USA
- Magazine: Gateau
- Original run: February 2012 – present
- Volumes: 17
- Anime television series
- Directed by: Yukina Hiiro
- Written by: Yūsei Naruse
- Music by: Takeshi Senoo; Mitsutaka Tajiri
- Studio: Encourage Films
- Licensed by: NA: Sentai Filmworks
- Original network: AT-X, Tokyo MX, BS NTV
- Original run: July 8, 2017 – September 23, 2017
- Episodes: 12
- icon

Hitorijime My Hero (Japanese: ひとりじめマイヒーロー, Hepburn: Hitoriji me Maihīrō), also known as My Very Own Hero, is a Japanese yaoi manga series written and illustrated by Memeco Arii about the romances between a teacher and his student, and the teacher's younger brother with his childhood friend. It has been serialized in Ichijinsha's Gateau since February 2012. An anime television series adaptation produced by Encourage Films aired from July 8, 2017, to September 23, 2017, and is licensed in English by Sentai Filmworks.

== Plot ==
Masahiro Setagawa has stopped believing in heroes as he believes that heroes do not truly exist, especially since he has been getting into a lot of trouble. He's been coerced into joining a gang and is often bullied and used as a gopher boy. However, soon an infamous street fighter named Kousuke Ooshiba, or the "Bear Killer" inadvertently saves him. This man happens to be the older brother of his best friend Kensuke Ooshiba and his current homeroom teacher. Now Kousuke has claimed Masahiro as his "underling" and promises to protect him, but the feelings seem to run far deeper for both. Meanwhile, Kensuke is reunited with an old friend Asaya Hasekura, a popular pretty boy who declares his love for Kensuke and leaves Kensuke confused and unsure.

== Characters ==
Masahiro Setagawa (勢田川正広, Setagawa Masahiro)
Voiced by: Toshiki Masuda (Japanese); Austin Tindle (English)
A weakling delinquent who used to be searching for a place to belong to. He is very adept at cooking and housework because his mother doesn't really care about doing much. He likes small animals and seems to be well-informed about them. Despite having the same family name (as the two are brothers), he still calls Kensuke by the name of Ooshiba even when around Kosusuke. He has dyed blond hair whose original color is bright orange.
Kousuke Ooshiba (大柴康介, Ōshiba Kōsuke)
Voiced by: Tomoaki Maeno (Japanese); David Matranga (English)
A high school teacher who teaches mathematics. He is feared by local delinquents and nicknamed the "Bear Killer" (熊殺し, Kuma-goroshi). He is very affectionate and often meddles with Masahiro's life.
Kensuke Ooshiba (大柴健介, Ōshiba Kensuke)
Voiced by: Yoshitsugu Matsuoka (Japanese); Alejandro Saab (English)
Kousuke's younger brother and Masahiro's best friend since junior high school. He often invites his friends to play and eat at the Ooshiba's house. He was a childhood friend of Asaya but currently is his boyfriend. Despite the fact that he and Ayaka are siblings, Kensuke still refers to Asaya by the family name Hasekura, and even calls his sister Ayaka Big Sister (お姉ちゃん, Onēchan).
Asaya Hasekura (支倉麻也, Hasekura Asaya)
Voiced by: Shinnosuke Tachibana (Japanese); Daman Mills (English)
A handsome boy who is very popular among other students. He has a big appetite and eats surprisingly quickly. He is Kensuke's boyfriend and is very possessive towards him.

== Media ==
=== Manga ===
Hitorijime My Hero began serialization in Ichijinsha's boy's love magazine Gateau in February 2012, and so far the chapters have been collected into 17 volumes. The series is a spin-off of Memeco Arii's earlier Hitorijime Boyfriend manga and currently has over 700,000 copies in print. Kodansha USA's manga imprint Kodansha Comics announced during their panel at Anime Expo 2018 that they have licensed the manga.

==== Hitorijime Boyfriend ====
No.	Original release date	Original ISBN	English release date	English ISBN
—	November 15, 2010	978-4-75-807122-2	December 7, 2021	978-1-6323-6933-8
Hitorijime Boyfriend #1; Hitorijime Boyfriend #2; Hitorijime Boyfriend #3; Hitorijime Boyfriend #4; Hitorijime Boyfriend #5; Their Future; The Ideal; Flags

==== Hitorijime My Hero ====
No.	Original release date	Original ISBN	English release date	English ISBN
1	February 15, 2012	978-4-7580-7178-9	January 22, 2019	978-1-6323-6771-6
Hitorijime My Hero #1; Hitorijime My Hero #2; Hitorijime My Hero #3; Hitorijime My Hero #4; Hitorijime My Hero #5; The Day Asaya-san Got Super Pissed
2	July 13, 2013	978-4-7580-7261-8	March 19, 2019	978-1-6323-6772-3
Hitorijime My Hero #5.5; Hitorijime My Hero #6; Hitorijime My Hero #6.5; Hitorijime My Hero #7; Hitorijime My Hero #8; Hitorijime My Hero #8.5; Hitorijime My Hero #9; Hitorijime My Hero #10; Me, Spring, and My Pain-in-the-Ass Husband
3	July 30, 2014	978-4-7580-7307-3	May 7, 2019	978-1-6323-6773-0
Hitorijime My Hero #2.5; Hitorijime My Hero #10.5; Hitorijime My Hero #11; Hitorijime My Hero #12; Hitorijime My Hero #12.5; Hitorijime My Hero #13; Hitorijime My Hero #14; Hitorijime My Hero #15; The Worries of an Old Man
4	April 30, 2015	978-4-7580-7408-7	July 9, 2019	978-1-6323-6795-2
Hitorijime My Hero #16; Hitorijime My Hero #16.5; Hitorijime My Hero #17; Hitorijime My Hero #18; Hitorijime My Hero #19; A Thousand Times Good Night; Hitorijime My Fair Lady
5	July 15, 2016	978-4-7580-7524-4	October 15, 2019	978-1-6323-6839-3
Hitorijime My Hero #20; Hitorijime My Hero #19.5; Hitorijime My Hero #21; Hitorijime My Hero #22; Hitorijime My Hero #23; Hitorijime My Hero #24; Hitorijime My Hero: Extra Story; Meanwhile, Inspector Houjou
6	June 29, 2017	978-4-7580-7699-9	January 14, 2020	978-1-6323-6897-3
Hitorijime My Hero #25; Hitorijime My Hero #26; Hitorijime My Hero #27; Hitorijime My Hero #28; Hitorijime My Hero #29; Hitorijime My Hero #30; Hitorijime Boyfriend #5.5; Hitorijime My Hero #25.5; Hug Hormone Day
7	January 30, 2018	978-4-7580-7778-1	April 14, 2020	978-1-6323-6931-4
Hitorijime My Hero #31; Hitorijime My Hero #32; Hitorijime My Hero #32.5; Hitorijime My Hero #33.5; Hitorijime My Hero #33; Hitorijime Boyfriend #6; Hitorijime Boyfriend #7; Hitorijime My Friend: Shige, Melancholy, and Winter 1; Hitorijime My Friend: Shige, Melancholy, and Winter 2; Love is 7,200 Calories Per Kilogram
8	December 28, 2018	978-4-7580-7887-0	November 10, 2020	978-1-6323-6932-1
Hitorijime My Hero #34; Hitorijime My Hero #35; Hitorijime My Hero #36; Hitorijime My Hero #37; Hitorijime My Hero #38; Hitorijime My Hero #39; Hitorijime My Hero #40; Hitorijime My Hero #37.5; Hitorijime My Hero: Bonus
9	August 29, 2019	978-4-7580-7970-9	March 2, 2021	978-1-6465-1045-0
Hitorijime My Hero #41; Hitorijime My Hero #42; Hitorijime My Hero #43; Hitorijime My Hero #44; Hitorijime My Hero #45; Hitorijime My Hero #45.5; Hitorijime My Hero #40.5; Hitorijime My Hero: Bonus
10	July 29, 2020	978-4-7580-2122-7	June 1, 2021	978-1-6465-1046-7
Hitorijime My Hero #46; Hitorijime My Hero #47; Hitorijime My Hero #48; Hitorijime My Hero #49; Hitorijime My Hero #50; Hitorijime My Hero #51; Hitorijime My Hero: Extra Story; Hitorijime My Hero: Bonus
11	May 31, 2021	978-4-7580-2233-0	December 21, 2021	978-1-6465-1217-1
Hitorijime My Hero #52; Hitorijime My Hero #53; Hitorijime My Hero #54; Hitorijime My Hero #55; Hitorijime My Hero #56; Hitorijime My Hero #57; Hitorijime My Hero #53.5; Hitorijime My Hero #54.5; Hitorijime My Hero: Bonus
12	November 30, 2021	978-4-7580-2323-8	April 26, 2022	978-1-6465-1409-0
Hitorijime My Hero #58; Hitorijime My Hero #59; Hitorijime My Hero #60; Hitorijime My Hero #61; Hitorijime My Hero #62; Hitorijime My Hero #63; Hitorijime My Hero #64; Hitorijime My Hero: Bonus
13	June 30, 2022	978-4-7580-2431-0	January 17, 2023	978-1-6465-1574-5
Hitorijime My Hero #65; Hitorijime My Hero #66; Hitorijime My Hero #67; Hitorijime My Hero #68; Hitorijime My Hero #69; Hitorijime My Hero #70; Hitorijime My Hero #71; Hitorijime My Hero #60.5; Hitorijime My Hero #66.5; Hitorijime My Hero: Bonus
14	March 30, 2023	978-4-7580-2510-2	November 14, 2023	978-1-6465-1701-5
Hitorijime My Hero #72; Hitorijime My Hero #73; Hitorijime My Hero #74; Hitorijime My Hero #75; Hitorijime My Hero #76; Hitorijime My Hero #77; Hitorijime My Hero #78; Hitorijime My Hero #79; Hitorijime My Hero: Bonus
15	April 15, 2024	978-4-7580-2685-7	January 28, 2025	979-8-8947-8356-7
Hitorijime My Hero #72; Hitorijime My Hero #80; Hitorijime My Hero #81; Hitorijime My Hero #82; Hitorijime My Hero #83; Hitorijime My Hero #84; Hitorijime My Hero #85; Hitorijime My Hero #86; Hitorijime My Hero #87; Hitorijime My Hero: Bonus
16	January 15, 2025	978-4-7580-2831-8	—	—
Hitorijime My Hero #88; Hitorijime My Hero #89; Hitorijime My Hero #90; Hitorijime My Hero #91; Hitorijime My Hero #92; Hitorijime My Hero #93; Hitorijime My Hero #94; Hitorijime My Hero: Bonus
17	March 13, 2026	978-4-7580-8974-6	—	—
Hitorijime My Hero #95; Hitorijime My Hero #95.5; Hitorijime My Hero #96; Hitorijime My Hero #97; Hitorijime My Hero #98; Hitorijime My Hero #99; Hitorijime My Hero #100; Hitorijime My Hero #101; Hitorijime My Hero: Bonus

==== Chapters not yet published in volume format ====
These chapters have yet to be published in a tankōbon volume. They were originally serialized in Japanese in issues of Ichijinsha's Gateau since their January 2025 issue.

=== Anime ===
An anime television series adaptation directed by Yukina Hiiro and animated by Encourage Films aired from July 8, 2017, to September 23, 2017, and has been licensed for an English release by Sentai Filmworks. The opening theme song is "Heart Signal" by Wataru Hatano and the ending theme is "True Love" covered by the voice actors of the four main characters. The anime adaptation rearranges some plot from the manga's story, starting chronologically from Masahiro and Kousuke's meeting and then continues to the main plot of Hitorijime Boyfriend, before continuing back to the main plot of Hitorijime My Hero.

==== List of episodes ====
No.	Title	Original release date
1	"In the Beginning, He Wouldn't Tell Me Anything"; Transliteration: "Hajimari wa, Itsumo Oshiete Moraenai." (Japanese: はじまりは、いつも教えてもらえない。)	July 8, 2017
Masahiro Setagawa, a middle-schooler and an errand boy for a local gang, leaves home since his prostitute mother has brought a client home for the night. Outside, he meets Kensuke Ohshiba, who has found an abandoned kitten in a park and asks Masahiro to help him care for it at his home. At the Ohshiba home, Kensuke's older brother, Kousuke, arrives home. Masahiro identifies Kousuke as the notorious "Bear Killer" who has terrorized members of Masahiro's gang, and is immediately afraid of him. Moving to the present day where Masahiro and Kensuke are now classmates in High School, Kensuke encounters a former friend, Asaya Hasekura, who he feels awkward around since he was cruel to Asaya in grade school. Asaya is eager to approach Kensuke, who runs away. Kensuke encounters Masahiro, who is trying to hide from his former gang who has found him. The two hide in a park until Kousuke arrives to defend them. Kousuke tells them that he will be the new math teacher at their High School and will be moving back into the Ohshiba house to live with Kensuke.
2	"The Days Go On, But There's More"; Transliteration: "Guruguru Mainichi, Dakedo Motto" (Japanese: ぐるぐる毎日、だけどもっと。)	July 15, 2017
In a scene from childhood, Asaya tells Kensuke that he will be moving, and Kensuke cuts off their friendship. In the present day, Kensuke is reluctant to go to school, fearful of encountering Asaya. At school, female classmates approach Kensuke to learn more about Asaya, whom they find attractive, knowing that Kensuke and Asaya were friends in grade school. Kensuke continues to avoid Asaya, angry at him for his calm behavior when he feels Asaya should be angry at him for how he treated him in the past. Asaya admits that he is not as calm as he appears, the truth being that he has been in love with Kensuke and misses him. Asaya attempts to kiss Kensuke, but they are interrupted. The next day, Kensuke feels pleased that his relationship with Asaya has been repaired. He asks Asaya if he has a girlfriend, and Asaya becomes frustrated that Kensuke does not understand his feelings for him. He pulls him aside and kisses him under the bridge, giving him an ultimatum to sleep with him or cut ties with him.
3	"Like a Teeny, Tiny Ray of Light"; Transliteration: "Sore wa, Chiisana Chiisana Hikari no You ni." (Japanese: それは、ちいさなちいさな光のように。)	July 22, 2017
Kensuke is upset with Asaya, feeling he should cut ties with him. He asks Masahiro for advice, and Asaya becomes jealous of the two spending time together. Asaya later pressures Kensuke for an answer, unable to accept being friends with Kensuke after kissing and making out. He forcefully kisses Kensuke and says that they were never "just friends" as Asaya has always had romantic feelings for him. Masahiro gives Kensuke advice that it is unfair to leave Asaya in limbo and should either accept or reject him. Kensuke tries to find Asaya at his home but then goes to climb up a mountain that the two explored together as kids. Finding that Kensuke tried to visit him, he goes to the same mountain where they meet. They return to Asaya's home where they hug in bed together.
4	"A Hunch, Hidden by Fragrant Smoke"; Transliteration: "Yokan wa, Kuyuru Kemuri ni Kakureteru." (Japanese: 予感は、くゆる煙にかくれてる。)	July 29, 2017
At the Ohshiba house, Masahiro cooks dinner for classmates who discuss Kensuke and Asaya's new relationship as the two cuddle in bed upstairs. After dinner, Kousuke asks Masahiro to buy him more cigarettes but realizing that Masahiro is underage, he walks to the store with him. As they walk, Kousuke tells Masahiro that he notices the way Masahiro looks at him, likely envious of Kensuke and Asaya's relationship. Kousuke tells him that he cannot return Masahiro's feelings. Masahiro begins avoiding the Ohshiba house, trying to deny his feelings for Kousuke. Upon returning home and finding his mother with another male client, Masahiro leaves home and is found by detective Tsunehito Houjou, a friend of Kousuke, who threatens to call the cops on Masahiro for being out after curfew. He learns that Masahiro is a student at the school where Kousuke works and calls him to pick up Masahiro. Kousuke tries to talk to Masahiro but Masahiro runs home. At school, Kousuke sees Masahiro struggling and sees a female classmate give him food since Masahiro forgot lunch. Kousuke, feeling jealous, approaches Masahiro and explains that he rejected Masahiro for his own good so that he could get over him. Masahiro tries to claim that he is normal and likes girls, but Kousuke sees through his lie. He tells Masahiro that while he cannot return his feelings, he cannot ignore a student in need. He kisses Masahiro and walks away.
5	"A Person Worthy of Love"; Transliteration: "Ai Suru ni Taru, Sonzai." (Japanese: 愛するに足る、存在。)	August 5, 2017
Masahiro feels conflicted and confused by the kiss Kousuke gave him at school, trying to forget about it but being unable to act normal around Kousuke. Studying with Kensuke for an exam at his house, Masahiro talks with Kensuke and Kousuke's mother, who shows him photo albums, which include photos of Masahiro when he was young. He learns more about Kousuke from his mother. Masahiro runs away when Kousuke arrives home. Kousuke leaves and goes to Relax Bar Mary to meet his friends, wanting to avoid the kids who are at home. Houjou gives Kousuke advice that his aim to protect Masahiro is not doing him any good. As Masahiro rushes away from the Ohshiba home, he is confronted by members of his old gang.
6	"My Savior, Be Free"; Transliteration: "Kyuuseishu yo, Jiyuu de Are." (Japanese: 救世主よ、自由であれ。)	August 12, 2017
Masahiro is approached by members of his former gang who are aware that the "Bear Killer" who has been systematically taking out other local gangs is a teacher at Masahiro's school. Masahiro resumes his former position as an errand boy for the gang, feeling unable to leave. Resuming this role, Masahiro begins showing up to school late and continues to avoid Kousuke and his school friends. Asaya, eating at the ramen shop where Masahiro works, learns that Masahiro is now back in the fold with the gang. Masahiro tries to ignore the gang, but he is fearful that they have followed him home. Just as he becomes fearful that they are going to break into his home, Kousuke instead breaks inside to reach him.
7	"The High School Boys Howl"; Transliteration: "Danshi Koukousei, Hoeru." (Japanese: 男子高校生、吠える。)	August 19, 2017
At Masahiro's house, Kousuke comments on the slovenly state of the apartment; Masahiro admits that his mother is neglectful and tends to trash the place when she is upset. With one of the gang members, Yabase, attempting to reach Masahiro by phone, Masahiro confesses to Kousuke that he has fallen back into their influence. Kousuke becomes angry that someone he cares about is trying to deal with this all alone, claiming he cannot ignore someone he loves who is in pain. Masahiro returns the anger, retorting that Kousuke rejected him first. Kousuke argues that his initial rejection was shock therapy so that Masahiro would realize his own feelings. As Masahiro expresses how he is not good enough for Kousuke, the thugs arrive at his house. Kousuke answers the door despite Masahiro's protests with the gang members identifying Kousuke as the Bear Killer. Upon Kousuke catching a punch directed at him, all present agree to take the fight to an abandoned warehouse. In hand-to-hand combat, Kousuke defends himself against every challenger. Yabase, jealous that Masahiro chose Kousuke over him, attempts to stab Kousuke with an ice pick. Masahiro sees this and steps in front of Kouske, taking an injury to his shoulder. Kousuke grabs Yabase by the neck to beat him, but Masahiro asks him to stop and calls for a truce. There is agreement that the gang will leave Kousuke and Masahiro alone. Masahiro admits that he loves Kousuke and begins crying and hugging him. Kousuke says he has been wanting Masahiro to cry against his chest for a long time. After Masahiro is seen in a hospital, he spends time with Kousuke as he is grading papers. Kousuke suggests that he give Masahiro a bath, which he rejects, uncomfortable with this idea. Eventually, they kiss and go to Kousuke's bed where they lay together. Kousuke asks Masahiro to stop being his sidekick and become his secret wife.
8	"Inextinguishable Emotions Push Me Forward"; Transliteration: "Tomedonai Kimochi, Senaka o Oshite." (Japanese: とめどない気持ち、背中を押して。)	August 26, 2017
Kousuke kisses Masahiro at school, but Masahiro pushes him away, not wanting for them to be caught. Masahiro goes to Asaya for relationship advice, feeling there is no one else with whom he can safely discuss the situation. After school, Kousuke asks Masahiro to walk home with him, stopping by the pet shop to get food for the cat. Masahiro is excited by all of the animals, especially a particular dog. The next day, Asaya tells Kensuke that his brother and Masahiro are dating. Masahiro makes Kousuke a bento box for lunch but sees another female student offering Kousuke a bento box, so Masahiro leaves before giving it to Kousuke. Kensuke and Asaya later give the bento box to Kousuke for him to eat at home, and Kousuke tells Masahiro that he rejected the bento box from the female student offered him since he only accepts lunch made by his wife. Masahiro takes the initiative to kiss Kousuke for the first time in their relationship. Kousuke then shows Masahiro that he has adopted the dog from the store that Masahiro had wanted.
9	"Where My Feelings are Headed"; Transliteration: "Kono Omoi no, Mukau Saki." (Japanese: この想いの、向かう先)	September 2, 2017
Jirou sees Masahiro and Kousuke kissing after school and tells his friends, including Kensuke, wanting to know if they are in a relationship. Mitsuru calls their relationship disgusting, and Kensuke asks him to leave if he is going to say things like that. Mitsuru begins hanging out with a different circle of friends. With encouragement from Kousuke, Masahiro approaches Mitsuru to explain his feelings for Kousuke so that they can become friends again. Mitsuru still does not understand why Masahiro would want to date an old man, but he explains that he only called their relationship disgusting because he was surprised by it and felt left out since he was the last to know about the situation. Mitsuru and Masahiro agree to become friends again.
10	"Why Is It So Hard To Be Happy?"; Transliteration: "Shiawasette, Konna ni Kurushii." (Japanese: 幸せって、こんなに苦しい。)	September 9, 2017
Kousuke approaches Masahiro, who is cooking dinner, wanting to be intimate with him, but Masahiro is fearful of others knowing. Kousuke takes Masahiro to a hotel for the night, though they only cuddle on the bed and sleep for the night. At school, Masahiro lies to his friends about where he went that night. Kousuke tells Masahiro to meet with him after school because they have been found out. They meet at a bar where Kousuke's friends ask about their relationship. They explain that Kousuke would be found to be a predator, and Masahiro would be perceived as a victim seduced by Kousuke. Masahiro insists that he was the one to pursue Kousuke, and Kousuke's friends announce that Masahiro has passed the test, allowing them to continue their relationship. Kousuke takes Masahiro on a date, but Masahiro continues to feel insecure about being seen next to him. He is fearful that Kousuke will lose his job because of him, and he would fall apart if that were to happen. Kousuke says that he would still accept Masahiro even if he fell apart.
11	"That's Why I Just Want You to Smile"; Transliteration: "Dakara, Tada Waratte Ite Hoshii." (Japanese: だから、ただ笑っていてほしい。)	September 16, 2017
Mitsuru and Yunge see Kousuke enter the principal's office, where he is told he is no longer a temporary teacher. The boys panic and tell Kensuke, who rushes to talk to his brother. Masahiro is skipping school until Kensuke sends him a text telling him that his brother might be fired. Masahiro rushes to school with the intention to quit school so that Kousuke is not fired, but Kensuke stops him on time. Kensuke explains that they were wrong, and Kousuke is actually being made a permanent member of staff instead. Masahiro, Kensuke, and Hasekura then go to Hasekura's house to plan a surprise party to celebrate his new job, but Masahiro is still concerned that their relationship is a threat to Kousuke's future. Hasekura suggests that Kousuke might dump Masahiro if he doesn't get over his insecurity, and Kensuke gets angry at Masahiro's apathy towards potentially being dumped. Masahiro runs out into the rain with Kensuke chasing him. Houjou picks up Kousuke and comments on how he seems apathetic to the problem in their relationship. Masahiro takes shelter from the rain at the "Relax Bar Mary" and receives advice from Natsuo about what to do. Kensuke returns home and gets angry at an apathetic Kousuke as Masahiro takes a train to a random beach. Kousuke rings Masahiro and Masahiro congratulates him for getting a promotion and being a great teacher, before he breaks up with Kousuke and throws his phone away in the ocean.
12	"The Kindest Place In The World"; Transliteration: "Sekai de Ichiban, Yasashii Basho." (Japanese: 世界で1番, やさしい場所。)	September 23, 2017
Masahiro meets Kensuke, his mother, and Hasekura out shopping the next day. Masahiro explains that the surprise party doesn't matter anymore because they've broken up. At the same time, Kousuke leaves a letter at Masahiro's house. He then finds Masahiro at the nearby park that Kensuke and he hid in from the gang in the first episode. Kousuke explains that he understands why Masahiro broke up with him, and that he didn't realize the strain he'd put on Masahiro with their relationship. Kousuke then asks to visit the pet store again to learn what cat food Sasa likes because she's nearly run out. On the way back, Kousuke explains that he doesn't want to break up with Masahiro which surprises him, as he has misunderstood their conversation from the day before. Kousuke asks Masahiro to think over their breakup and to meet him at the cliff-side they visited earlier that week if he decides to give them another try as a couple. The next day, before Masahiro's mom goes out for the night for Christmas, she mentions a letter she found from Kousuke in the door the day before. Masahiro says he won't read it before it won't change anything, but eventually, curiosity gets the better of him and he reads it. Masahiro realizes he wants to be with Kousuke and rushes to the meeting point hoping he isn't too late. Masahiro confesses that he loves Kousuke, and Kousuke confesses his feelings, too. They kiss and Kousuke gives Masahiro a ring, but unfortunately, it doesn't fit.
