= The Gorilla God's Go-To Girl =

Japanese web novel series

- First tankōbon volume cover of the manga adaptation, featuring (from left to right) the Gorilla God, Sophia Reeler, and Louis Scarrel

ゴリラの神から加護された令嬢は王立騎士団で可愛がられる (Gorira no Kami Kara Kago Sareta Reijō wa Ōritsu Kishidan de Kawaigareru)
- Genre: Fantasy; Romantic comedy
- Novel series
- Written by: Shirohi
- Published by: Shōsetsuka ni Narō
- Original run: August 10, 2020 – August 23, 2021
- Manga
- Written by: Shirohi
- Illustrated by: Mika Kamisu
- Published by: Kadokawa Shoten
- Imprint: Flos Comic
- Magazine: ComicWalker
- Original run: August 8, 2021 – January 11, 2026
- Volumes: 8
- Anime television series
- Directed by: Fumitoshi Oizaki
- Written by: Hitomi Amamiya
- Music by: Yayoi Tateishi
- Studio: Kachigarasu
- Licensed by: Crunchyroll
- Original network: AT-X, Tokyo MX, SUN, KBS Kyoto, BS Asahi
- Original run: April 6, 2025 – June 22, 2025
- Episodes: 12

The Gorilla God's Go-To Girl (ゴリラの神から加護された令嬢は王立騎士団で可愛がられる, Gorira no Kami Kara Kago Sareta Reijō wa Ōritsu Kishidan de Kawaiigareru; lit. 'The Lady Blessed by the Gorilla God Is Adored by the Royal Knights') is a Japanese web novel series written by Shirohi. It was serialized online from August 2020 to August 2021 on the user-generated novel publishing website Shōsetsuka ni Narō. No printed version of the novel series has been published yet. A manga adaptation with art by Mika Kamisu was serialized online via Kadokawa Corporation's ComicWalker manga website from August 2021 to January 2026 and was collected in eight tankōbon volumes. An anime television series adaptation produced by Kachigarasu aired from April to June 2025.

== Plot ==
The story is set in a world where sixteen-year-olds receive blessings from animal gods that shape their abilities and social roles. Sophia Reeler, a shy noblewoman and count's daughter, unexpectedly receives the blessing of the Gorilla God, regarded as the strongest in combat. Hoping for a quiet school life, Sophia instead draws attention for her rare and overwhelming power and is recruited as an apprentice by the Royal Knights. As she balances her studies, knightly duties, and efforts to conceal her strength, Sophia repeatedly finds herself standing out despite her wish to fit in. Her struggle to reconcile her timid personality with the complications that come with possessing extraordinary power are supported by the talented young knights she meets.

== Characters ==
Sophia Reeler (ソフィア・リーラー, Sofia Rīrā)
Voiced by: Kanna Nakamura (Japanese); Tia Ballard (English)
A young girl who at 16 chose a blessing and gained the rare Gorilla Card, which grants her super-strength, speed and agility.
Louis Scarrel (ルイ・スカーレル, Rui Sukāreru)
Voiced by: Takeo Ōtsuka (Japanese); Aiden Call (English)
A Knight who was in charge of the testing of Sophia and other candidates.
Isaac Sheehan (アイザック・シーアン, Aizakku Shīan)
Voiced by: Reiji Kawashima (Japanese); Kevin D. Thelwell (English)
Eddie Pheles (エディ・フェレス, Edi Feresu)
Voiced by: Takuma Nagatsuka (Japanese); Landon McDonald (English)
Arcient Adler (アーシェント・アードラー, Āshento Ādorā)
Voiced by: Shugo Nakamura (Japanese); Reagan Murdock (English)
Shin Kuvare (シン・クヴァレ)
Voiced by: Shun'ichi Toki (Japanese); Eduardo Vildasol (English)
Victor Volk (ヴィクトル・ヴォルク, Vikutoru Voruku)
Voiced by: Hinata Tadokoro (Japanese); David Matranga (English)
Leohart (レオハルト, Reoharuto)
Voiced by: Yūichirō Umehara (Japanese); Ben Stegmair (English)
Carissa (カリッサ, Karissa)
Voiced by: Nozomi Yamamoto (Japanese); Francine Gonzalez (English)
Alene (アレーネ, Arēne)
Voiced by: Kyōka Moriya (Japanese); Mikaela Krantz (English)

== Media ==
=== Web novel ===
Written by Shirohi, The Gorilla God's Go-To Girl was serialized as a web novel on the Shōsetsuka ni Narō website from August 10, 2020, to August 23, 2021. A print version of the novel has not been released.

=== Manga ===
A manga adaptation with art by Mika Kamisu was serialized on Kadokawa Corporation's ComicWalker manga website from August 8, 2021, to January 11, 2026. Its chapters were collected into eight tankōbon volumes released from November 5, 2021, to February 5, 2026.

No.	Release date	ISBN
1	November 5, 2021	978-4-04-680446-4
2	June 3, 2022	978-4-04-681550-7
3	December 16, 2022	978-4-04-681857-7
4	September 5, 2023	978-4-04-682738-8
5	May 17, 2024	978-4-04-683435-5
6	December 5, 2024	978-4-04-684319-7
7	June 17, 2025	978-4-04-685002-7
8	February 5, 2026	978-4-04-685407-0

=== Anime ===
An anime television series adaptation was announced on World Gorilla Day on September 24, 2024. It is produced by Kachigarasu and directed by Fumitoshi Oizaki, with scripts written by Hitomi Amamiya, characters designed by Sakae Shibuya, and music composed by Yayoi Tateishi. The series aired from April 6 to June 22, 2025, on AT-X and other networks. The opening theme song is "Illuminate" (イルミネイト), performed by Shugo Nakamura, while the ending theme song is "Serendipity" (セレンディピティ), performed by Megumi Ogata. Crunchyroll is streaming the series.

==== Episodes ====
No.	Title	Directed by	Storyboarded by	Original release date
1	"The Gorilla Life of a Lady and Blessings"; Transliteration: "Kago to Reijō no Gori・Raifu" (Japanese: 加護と令嬢のゴリ・ライフ)	Fumitoshi Oizaki	Fumitoshi Oizaki	April 6, 2025
Sophia Reeler takes part in a ceremony with other students from the Dierentown Academy for Nobles to receive blessings from the Animal Gods. Being shy Sophia panics at the thought of some of the blessings which would draw the kind of attention she prefers to avoid. To her surprise Sophia is blessed with the combat strength of ten men by the Gorilla God, who almost never blesses anybody. Being the daughter of a minor Count Sophia keeps her blessing secret from her higher ranked bullies, especially the popular Carissa. Unfortunately, due to her potential as a warrior Sophia is immediately invited to sit the exam to become a knight in training, the exact opposite of the peaceful life she desires. She decides to fail the exam on purpose but on her way there she ends up helping an elderly man deliver heavy cargo and becomes lost. She is approached by a handsome young man who directs her to the knights training grounds where he is the examiner Sir Louis, the youngest knight in history. Sophia is nervous but determined to fail. Unfortunately, with her blessing she accidentally excels at every physical task. She also rescues fellow examinee Isaac, who falls during the rope climb due to being afraid of heights. Sophia finds herself oddly attracted to Louis after he bandages her injured hand.
2	"The Gorilla Signs of Affection That I Always Dreamed Of"; Transliteration: "Kishi to Akogare no Gori・Rabukōru" (Japanese: 騎士とあこがれのゴリ・ラブコール)	Yuki Shiina	Fumitoshi Oizaki	April 13, 2025
Sophia and the others are told to expect their exam results soon. Isaac hero worships Louis who joined the knights at 15 before even receiving his blessing and is expected to become squad captain. Eddie, another examinee, is bullied for being the son of Lord Pheles mistress instead of his wife. Sophia accidentally throws one of the bullies into a tree, ending the fight. Eddie guesses Sophia was blessed by the Gorilla and that Isaac was blessed by the Dog, giving him increased speed. He admits to feeling jealous since the Gorilla blessing makes Sophia one of the greatest warriors in the world, yet she acts scared all the time. Eddie chooses to keep his blessing private but thanks Sophia for her assistance. Despite trying her hardest to fail Sophia passes the exam and is told she must begin knight training in the evenings. Isaac, Eddie and Louis suddenly transfer to her school. Carissa and the girls are unhappy three handsome men pay attention to Sophia, especially Louis, and the more time they spend with her the worse the girls jealousy becomes. Louis informs her about the induction ceremony where she will meet the squad captain and the other new trainees. Carissa and the girls finally catch up to her and demand answers about Louis.
3	"A Gorilla Rhapsody of Sweets at the Royal Capital"; Transliteration: "Ō Miyako to Suītsu no Gori・Rapusodī" (Japanese: 王都とスイーツのゴリ・ラプソディー)	Sumito Sasaki	Katsuyuki Kodera	April 20, 2025
Sophia deters Carissa by claiming she and Louis' families are minor acquaintances. Sophia attends a welcoming ceremony for junior knights and is embarrassed when Grand Master Ernst Cheval chastises her for having messy hair. Louis takes her to see Boss, a former knight and terrifyingly aggressive hairdresser. Soon, Sophia has a feminine haircut suitable for combat. Sophia is surprised how beautiful she feels. She invites Louis to a café to repay his kindness and is surprised Louis has not entered into an arranged betrothal yet as he has a goal he wishes to achieve first. Louis abruptly asks if she was blessed by the Gorilla. Despite her shame at her unfeminine blessing, Sophia admits it and fears he will dislike her. However, Louis is impressed and offers her any assistance she requires. Meanwhile, Squad Commander Shin Qualle takes an interest in Sophia. Sophia attends rifle training with Musketeer Commander Arcient Adler who quickly notices Eddie's skills with firearms, the Pheles family being famous for producing snipers. He also hints to Sophia he is aware of her blessing. Isaac reminds Sophia there will be a formal dance at school. Sophia is depressed as not only does she not want to attend, she doesn't own a suitable dress. Arcient returns to the other Commanders where there is some disagreement over whose squad Sophia should join.
4	"A Gorilla Rendezvous with a Dress and Bewilderment"; Transliteration: "Doresu to Konwaku no Gori・Randebū" (Japanese: ドレスと困惑のゴリ・ランデブー)	Yuki Shiina	Fumitoshi Oizaki	April 27, 2025
Sophia is shocked when her parents send her a brand new red dress which she refuses to wear, instead reusing an old blue dress. Carissa mocks Sophia who doesn't have a partner but Louis asks to be her partner. Carissa is enraged and sends one of her followers to spill juice on her dress, yet Sophia catches the glass instinctively. Louis reveals a terrorist group claims to have planted bombs at the party and wants her, Isaac and Eddie to help find them. Carissa sends another follower to destroy Sophia's dress with scissors, but Louis calmly carries Sophia away, embarrassing both the follower and Carissa. Needing to find the bombs Sophia is forced to wear the red dress. She is stopped by Carissa's partner, Leohart, who attempts to flirt with her and becomes angry when she ignores him. Isaac and Eddy don't find any bombs and are sure it was just a prank. Seeing how untidy she looks Eddie forces her to wear makeup. Louis is astounded by the change, as is Carissa who sends one of her other victims Araignee to lure Sophia to an empty building and lock her in a crate. Despite knowing she can escape Sophia decides to stay in hopes Carissa will leave Araignee alone. Men appear and retrieve the crate, shocking her as they carry her to the third floor.
5	"A Lovely Gorilla Romance Filled with Danger and Blushing"; Transliteration: "Kiken to Sekimen no Gori・Raburomansu" (Japanese: 危険と赤面のゴリ・ラブロマンス)	Yuki Shiina	Fumitoshi Ozaki	May 4, 2025
On the third floor Sophia again chooses to stay so Araignee won't be bullied. A squirrel suddenly appears and she realises it is one she fed in the school courtyard. She ends up confessing to the squirrel she wishes she could have stayed at the party with Louis. As she contemplates her feelings she suddenly realises she likes him. Breaking out of the room she overhears two men and despite her fear she apprehends them. The squirrel suddenly points her to a bomb hidden nearby. Grabbing the bomb she leaps from the window and rushes to get it away from the party. The squirrel follows her so instead she throws the bomb high into the sky where it explodes among the party's fireworks display. Isaac and Eddie find her so the squirrel quietly slips away. She reports what happened to an unhappy Louis and fears she has somehow upset him as he barely looks at her. The next day Carissa and her followers and Araignee all apologise to Sophia since several witnesses reported their bullying to the teachers. Sophia naturally forgives them so they decide to start being nicer to her. Sophia worries she and Louis might never be the same again.
6	"Gorilla Lovers of Snow and Fire"; Transliteration: "Yuki to Honō no Gori・Rabāzu" (Japanese: 雪と炎のゴリ・ラバーズ)	Ageha Kochōran	Katsuyuki Kodera	May 11, 2025
The men Sophia apprehended admit to being members of Daybreak, an anti-royalty group. Winter arrives and Louis continues to avoid Sophia. Field training in the mountains is announced for the junior knights. Eddy collapses from the cold and while Sophia throws him to safety she herself falls off the mountain. Louis impulsively jumps after her. Sophia locates a cabin but realises she lost her fire-making kit. The same squirrel suddenly appears suffering from the cold, but having retrieved her fire-kit. Sophia falls asleep with the squirrel but the next morning she finds Louis, naked. Embarrassed, Louis is forced to admit he was blessed by the Squirrel God and can turn into a squirrel, meaning when Sophia told the squirrel she likes Louis during the bomb incident, she was actually saying it to Louis. Sophia is mortified but Louis admits it was the first time a woman directly told him she likes him, causing him to become embarrassed and avoid her. However, when he saw her fall off the mountain he realised he loves her. Sophia confesses she loves him too and they almost kiss but Isaac, using his dog blessing to track her scent, breaks down the door so suddenly Sophia panics and knocks Louis through a wall.
7	"The Sofa and Romance's Gorilla Love Song"; Transliteration: "Sofa to Koi no Gori・Rabusongu" (Japanese: ソファと恋のゴリ・ラブソング)	Yudai Hanaoka	Yudai Hanaoka	May 18, 2025
The escaped members of Daybreak, Lloyd and Keith, report to their master Leohart. Isaac decides to throw a Christmas party for students staying at school over the holiday. Due to their schedules Sophia hasn't seen Louis since their confession. Louis hugs her as soon as they see each other but Sophia fears the other girls finding out. Eddy buys Sophia a hair accessory as thanks for her help on the mountain. Isaac buys her a scarf and almost confesses to her but Sophia mentions she has never received gifts from friends before, making him realise she only sees him as a friend. After the party Louis visits her room where she drags him inside before any girls see him. Louis gifts her a jewelled necklace. In turn Sophia reveals she saved him some cake from the party. Sophia admits she is jealous other girls can talk to him in public. Louis decides to just announce their relationship but Sophia refuses, fearing the bullying that would follow. Louis shows some jealousy that Isaac and Eddy bought her gifts but Sophia assures him he is the only man she loves. They share their first kiss but Sophia panics and tries to stand up, ending up with Louis falling on top of her.
8	"A Gorilla Romantic Comedy with the Girl I Fancy"; Transliteration: "Ki ni Naru Kanojo to Gori・Rabukome" (Japanese: 気になる彼女とゴリ・ラブコメ)	Ageha Kochōran	Katsuyuki Kodera	May 25, 2025
8	"A Gorilla Romantic Comedy with My Classmate"; Transliteration: "Ki ni Naru Dōki to Gori・Rabukome" (Japanese: 気になる同期とゴリ・ラブコメ)	Ageha Kochōran	Katsuyuki Kodera	May 25, 2025
8	"A Gorilla Romantic Comedy with My Friend That I Fancy"; Transliteration: "Ki ni Naru Tomodachi to Gori・Rabukome" (Japanese: 気になる友達とゴリ・ラブコメ)	Ageha Kochōran	Katsuyuki Kodera	May 25, 2025
After a momentary hesitation Louis jumps off her and apologises. Before he leaves he invites her to visit his home. On his day off Arcient spots Sophia and decides to spy on her while she is working, becoming intrigued upon seeing her throwing drunks out of a pub. He offers to buy her a coffee, but she declines in case it starts a rumour. Arcient is left confused by their encounter. Isaac has a dream of dating Sophia which he tells Eddy about, causing Eddy to remember an encounter with Sophia that embarrasses him. Isaac worries Sophia might have a crush on someone but Eddy refuses to think about it. Carissa has become friends with Araignee and takes her shopping. They encounter Sophia on patrol and realise for the first time Sophia is a Junior Knight. Sophia is embarrassed but Carissa assures her serving as a knight is an achievement. Araignee even reveals Sophia helped her become more confident. Carissa asks if there are any eligible men in the knights. Sophia is confused, having assumed Leohart was Carissa's boyfriend, but Carissa reveals Leohart approached her before the dance and somehow worked his way into being her dance partner, though she had never met him before and hasn't seen him since then either.
9	"The Gorilla Land of Oceans and Swimsuits"; Transliteration: "Umi to Mizugi no Gori・Rando" (Japanese: 海と水着のゴリ・ランド)	Fumitoshi Oizaki	Fumitoshi Oizaki	June 1, 2025
The military begins its annual Military Arts Contest between the Knights, Navy and Riflemen. Since each branch of the military want Sophia to participate on their team due to her having the Gorilla blessing, she is placed with the first aid team to avoid conflict. Isaac is defeated in a race by Knight Commander Viktor, blessed by the Wolf. Louis is defeated at swimming by the sailor Gilbert, blessed by the Killer-whale. During paintball Eddy tricks Arcient into thinking he is a girl by wearing a wig then shooting him when Arcient tries to flirt with him. During the scavenger hunt Sophia is chased by many people, since almost every item description could refer to her; Someone trustworthy, Someone strong, Someone fast, but Louis manages to collect her himself. The contest is cancelled when a hotel collapses into the harbour and the competitors are sent to help. Carissa is swept out to sea so Sophia jumps across the debris to get her despite gorilla's being poor swimmers. She is aided by Louis and Gilbert, who help her return Carissa to shore. Gilbert is embarrassed when Carissa sets her sights on him. Sophia is besieged by the Commanders wanting her to join their squads. Later, Louis admits his item description was Person I want to protect. The moment is ruined by Isaac arriving, so Sophia and Louis settle for watching the fireworks.
10	"The Gorilla Labyrinth of Light and Darkness"; Transliteration: "Hikari to Yami no Gori・Rabirinsu" (Japanese: 光と闇のゴリ・ラビリンス)	Ageha Kochōran	Katsuyuki Kodera	June 8, 2025
Sophia attends her first official date with Louis. Elsewhere, a Daybreak sniper shoots a Duke, who barely survives. Louis invites Sophia to his home for dinner, though she panics a little as Louis lives alone. While shopping for ingredients Sophia sees the inequality of those with inferior blessings, such as those blessed by insects, living in near poverty and abused by the nobility. Louis wishes to do something about this but remains unable until he has been promoted within the knight's hierarchy. Arriving at his home Sophie manages to cook a meal without damaging Louis' kitchen. Louis is glad to see Sophia still wearing the necklace he gave her but worries he is only capable of showing his love with gifts. Sophia reassures him that she loves him no matter how he chooses to show his affection, so they kiss. Sensing her nervousness Louis stops and offers to walk her back to the academy. On the way he apologises for kissing her before she was ready but she explains it was merely that she has never done anything with a man before. After Louis departs Sophia is attacked by two men from Daybreak, but she easily smashes them into the wall. One of them drops a bottle of gas that causes her gorilla strength to disappear, allowing Leohart to force-feed her a drug. Nearby, another bomb explodes.
11	"The Mightiest Blessing and a Gorilla Rush"; Transliteration: "Saikyō no Kago to Gori・Rasshu" (Japanese: 最強の加護とゴリ・ラッシュ)	Keizo Kusakawa	Keizo Kusakawa	June 15, 2025
Sophia awakens unable to remember being attacked. Leohart introduces himself as Leohart Namir and claims he rescued her and brought her to safety. Leohart shows her an ordinary glass necklace and explains he grew up in the slums with his friends Cecil, Lloyd and Keith. The glass is from the ruined house they all lived in. Duke Namir, wishing to end inequality in the kingdom, offered to feed the slum children if Leohart became his son. Leohart agreed and soon afterwards received the powerful blessing of the Leopard. After this Namir confined Leohart in his mansion and insisted he focus only on bringing honour to the Namir family. Leohart eventually escapes and discovers Namir had the slums burnt down. He finds Keith and Lloyd living in the ruins but learns Cecil was killed. After murdering Namir Leohart established Daybreak to end blessing based inequality. He then reveals the Leopard is the only animal that can hunt gorillas, making him Sophia's equal in combat. As the strongest humans in the world, Leohart believes they are fated to be together and save the world, so he destroys Louis' jewel necklace and replaces it with his glass necklace, promising to destroy the academy and the royal capital. Enraged at her necklaces destruction, Sophia destroys the building and escapes the confused Leohart. Leaving the glass behind she retrieves the jewel from Louis necklace and rushes to reach the academy before Daybreak attacks.
12	"The Gorilla End Filled with Determination and Love"; Transliteration: "Ketsui to Ai no Gori・Rasuto" (Japanese: 決意と愛のゴリ・ラスト)	Fumitoshi Oizaki	Fumitoshi Oizaki	June 22, 2025
Daybreak invades the Academy. Sophia arrives and Carissa and Araignee insist on helping, with Araignee revealing she was blessed by the Spider and can create unbreakable spider silk. Carissa also admits to being blessed by the Mole, so she can navigate in complete darkness. Carissa guides them through the dark crawlspaces so Araignee can secure the classroom doors with silk to keep Daybreak out. To reach the Cathedral where Louis went Sophia crosses the Academy roof and battles an Ant-blessed Daybreaker, who can lift 100x his own bodyweight. Eddy falls through the roof while the Ant-blessed throws the clock-tower bell at Sophia, crashing her into the Cathedral where Louis has been defeated by Leohart. He points out she too is a victim, forced to become a knight just because she was Gorilla-blessed. He then tries to kiss her, but she bites his face in rejection. Leohart decides to kill her and wait for the next girl to be blessed by the Gorilla. Eddy arrives with Arcient and his riflemen, telling Leohart to surrender as they foiled his plans to take over the Academy. Leohart refuses and asks Sophia to be with him, but Sophia rejects him again, stating she will use her powers to protect everyone and punches Leohart, while Louis drops the Cathedral chandelier onto Leohart, defeating him. The rest of the knights appear and the injured Leohart is arrested for his crimes. Eddy admits he only survived falling though the roof because he is blessed by the Cat, and can land safely no matter how far he falls. Later, Louis graduates from the Academy and is promoted to full Knight, with the goal of becoming Knight Grand Master. He also reveals to Sophia that every Gorilla-blessed in the past ended up becoming Grand Master, so there is a chance he might have to compete against her. Sophia is content just being by his side and they both kiss.
