= Chillin' in My 30s After Getting Fired from the Demon King's Army =

Japanese light novel series

- First light novel volume cover

解雇された暗黒兵士（30代）のスローなセカンドライフ (Kaiko Sareta Ankoku Heishi (Sanjū-dai) no Surō na Sekando Raifu)
- Genre: Fantasy
- Novel series
- Written by: Rokujūyon Okazawa
- Published by: Shōsetsuka ni Narō
- Original run: November 15, 2018 – July 30, 2020
- Light novel
- Written by: Rokujūyon Okazawa
- Illustrated by: Sage Joh
- Published by: Kodansha
- Imprint: Kodansha Ranobe Books
- Original run: August 2, 2019 – present
- Volumes: 3
- Manga
- Written by: Rurekuchie
- Published by: Kodansha
- English publisher: US: Kodansha
- Imprint: Young Magazine Comics
- Magazine: Young Magazine the 3rd (2019–2021); Monthly Young Magazine (2021–present)
- Original run: August 6, 2019 – present
- Volumes: 20
- Anime television series
- Directed by: Fumitoshi Oizaki
- Written by: Hitomi Amamiya
- Music by: Tsubasa Ito
- Studio: Encourage Films
- Licensed by: Crunchyroll
- Original network: Tokyo MX
- Original run: January 7, 2023 – March 25, 2023
- Episodes: 12
- icon

Chillin' in My 30s After Getting Fired from the Demon King's Army (Japanese: 解雇された暗黒兵士（30代）のスローなセカンドライフ, Hepburn: Kaiko Sareta Ankoku Heishi (Sanjū-dai) no Surō na Sekando Raifu) is a Japanese light novel series written by Rokujūyon Okazawa and illustrated by Sage Joh. It was serialized online via the user-generated novel publishing website Shōsetsuka ni Narō from November 2018 to July 2020. It was later acquired by Kodansha, who have published three volumes since August 2019 under their Kodansha Ranobe Books imprint.

A manga adaptation by Rurekuchie was serialized in Kodansha's seinen manga magazine Young Magazine the 3rd from August 2019 to April 2021, and transferred to Monthly Young Magazine in May 2021. It has been collected into 20 tankōbon volumes as of November 2026. An anime television series adaptation produced by Encourage Films aired from January to March 2023.

== Plot ==
Dariel is a non-magical soldier serving the demon army as an aide to the demon lord Bashvaza until he is fired by him. Having nowhere to go, Dariel sets out into the world when he saves a human girl Malika, and is invited to her village. When Malika got him registered into the Adventurer Guild, Dariel discovered that he is actually human with an extraordinary talent in swordsmanship compared to the Hero. While things become worse in the demon army due to Dariel's absence, Dariel gets used to life among humans but is conflicted with his demon upbringing, as humans and demon society have been at war for centuries.

== Characters ==
Dariel (ダリエル, Darieru)
Voiced by: Tomokazu Sugita
Having been adopted by a demon, Dariel was unaware he was a human until his titular 30s. Being a pacifist who seeks to protect others, he begins changing the world views of others.
Malika (マリーカ, Malīka)
Voiced by: Akane Fujita
The daughter of the village chief that Dariel meets on his first day unemployed. She has fallen in love with him and almost kills him with bear hugs. The two eventually marry and have a son named Gran.
Bashvaza (バシュバーザ, Bashubāza)
Voiced by: Atsushi Abe
Dariel's younger adopted brother and successor to his father as one of the four Kings. However, Bashvaza is a buffoon who can't handle office management like his stepbrother, resulting in the Demon Army collapsing in on itself.
Gashita (ガシタ)
Voiced by: Tetsuya Kakihara
Rax Village's only adventurer, until Dariel arrived. He first considered Dariel as his rival. After being saved by Dariel from a monster, he finally accepts him and calls him "Big Brother".
Zebiantes (ゼビアンテス, Zeviantes)
Voiced by: Rumi Okubo
She is one of the Four Heavenly Kings.
Laidy (レーディ, Rēdi)
Voiced by: Akari Kitō
The current hero-in-training, having stepped in as Dariel's real father's successor, Aransil who retired and teaches her the life of a hero. Her real name is Radey. After learning from Dariel that humans were the ones instigating war by sending heroes to kill the Demon King, Laidy asks to learn from him.
Droyes (ドロイエ, Doroie)
Voiced by: Mai Nakahara
She is one of the Four Heavenly Kings.
Beseria (ベゼリア, Bezeria)
Voiced by: Satoshi Tsuruoka
He is one of the Four Heavenly Kings.
Lizette (リゼート, Rizēto)
Voiced by: Shinnosuke Tachibana
A demon friend of Dariel's.
Enbil (エンビル, Enbiru)
Voiced by: Kenji Hamada
Marika's father and Lux Village's chief before choosing Dariel as his successor.
Erica (エリーカ, Erīka)
Voiced by: Keiko Watanabe
Marika's mother and Enbil's Wife.
Smith (スミス, Sumisu)
Voiced by: Hiroshi Iwasaki
The blacksmith who creates weapons from the mithril mined by the Knockers. He died in the following year that Dariel moved in.
Granbaza (グランバーザ, Guranbāza)
Voiced by: Masaki Terasoma
Daniel's adopted father and one of the former four Heavenly Kings.
Aransil (アランツィル, Arantsiru)
Voiced by: Kazuhiko Inoue
The retired hero and Dariel's true father. He left Dariel to be raised as a weapon to give the demons a fighting chance, but he was instead given to Granbaza unaware of the plan.
Satome (サトメ)
Voiced by: Yūki Kudō
A member of Laidy's party.
Sessha (セッシャ)
Voiced by: Hiromichi Tezuka
A member of Laidy's party.
Fitbitan (フィットビタン, Fittobitan)
Voiced by: Takaki Ōtomari
A haughty adventurer seeking to bring greater achievements and benefits to his guild. While he is arrogant, Fitbitan means well.
Gran (グラン, Guran)
Voiced by: Keiko Watanabe (Japanese)
An infant son of Dariel and Malika and grandson of Aransil and Estellika, Enbil and Erica. He's honorarily named after his adoptive grandfather Granbarza. Gran is still a toddler, yet Dariel quickly notices that he has a bit too much interest in well-endowed women for his age. Gran didn't just shared his father's preference for women like Laidy, Satome, Doroye and Zebiantes, he also inherits his mother's strength and agility.
Estellika
The Deceased wife of Aransil and the biological mother of Dariel. She was killed by the water lord Bezetan, while Aransil was fighting to protect his family.

== Media ==
=== Light novel ===
Written by Rokujūyon Okazawa, Chillin' in My 30s After Getting Fired from the Demon King's Army was published online via the Shōsetsuka ni Narō website from November 15, 2018, to July 30, 2020. Kodansha acquired the series, and began publishing it with illustrations by Sage Joh on August 2, 2019, under their Kodansha Ranobe Books imprint. As of March 2020, three volumes have been published.

No.	Japanese release date	Japanese ISBN
1	August 2, 2019	978-4-06-516030-5
2	November 1, 2019	978-4-06-516918-6
3	March 27, 2020	978-4-06-518884-2

=== Manga ===
A manga adaptation by Rurekuchie began serialization in Kodansha's Young Magazine the 3rd on August 6, 2019. The series moved to Monthly Young Magazine on May 20, 2021. As of November 2026, 20 tankōbon volumes have been published.

Kodansha publishes the series in English on their K Manga service.

No.	Japanese release date	Japanese ISBN
1	March 27, 2020	978-4-06-518834-7
2	August 20, 2020	978-4-06-520202-9
3	January 20, 2021	978-4-06-522015-3
4	June 17, 2021	978-4-06-523675-8
5	November 18, 2021	978-4-06-525859-0
6	March 18, 2022	978-4-06-527058-5
7	July 20, 2022	978-4-06-528478-0
8	November 18, 2022	978-4-06-529791-9
9	March 20, 2023	978-4-06-531467-8
10	July 20, 2023	978-4-06-532373-1
11	November 20, 2023	978-4-06-533642-7
12	March 18, 2024	978-4-06-534960-1
13	July 19, 2024	978-4-06-536294-5
14	November 20, 2024	978-4-06-537536-5
15	March 18, 2025	978-4-06-538920-1
16	July 18, 2025	978-4-06-540195-8
17	November 20, 2025	978-4-06-541460-6
18	March 18, 2026	978-4-06-542915-0
19	July 17, 2026	978-4-06-544252-4
20	November 19, 2026	978-4-06-545678-1

=== Anime ===
An anime television series adaptation was announced in July 2022. The series is produced by Encourage Films and directed by Fumitoshi Oizaki, with assistant direction by Yoshihide Yūzumi, scripts written by Hitomi Amamiya, character designs handled by Satomi Yonezawa, and music composed by Tsubasa Ito. It aired from January 7 to March 25, 2023, on Tokyo MX and other networks. The opening theme song is "Changemaker" by Hinano, and the ending theme song is "Dear Doze Days" by Akari Kitō. Crunchyroll is streaming the series worldwide outside of Asia.

No.	Title	Directed by (Note: Information is taken from the ending credits of each episode.)	Written by	Storyboarded by	Original release date
1	"Dariel Gets Fired."; Transliteration: "Darieru, Kaiko Sareru." (Japanese: ダリエル、解雇される。)	Chuan Feng Xu	Hitomi Amamiya	Fumitoshi Oizaki	January 7, 2023
Dariel, stepson of Granverza, one of the four Demon Kings, is fired from the Demon Lord's army by his stepbrother Bashverza following Granverza's retirement, citing Dariel's inability to use magic. Homeless, Dariel wanders aimlessly until he meets a young woman named Marika fleeing a monster. Despite being unfamiliar with human weapons Dariel uses Marika's dagger and kills the monster. Grateful, Marika drags Dariel to her village. Hiding his demon identity Dariel only reveals he was fired recently. Marika's parents insist he stays with them and become a guild adventurer so he can protect the village from monsters. Dariel tries to protest as receiving a guild seal would expose him as not human, yet he somehow passes the test. Dariel realizes that despite being raised by demons he must actually be human. Dariel learns of Aura, a human magic that boosts weapon abilities, and despite believing himself weak he discovers his affinity for Aura, making him a master-class warrior. Marika's father Envil suggests Dariel might be better suited to a larger guild in a city, but Dariel decides to stay in the village. Marika is overjoyed but the village's only other adventurer, Gashita, is unimpressed until it is discovered the monster Dariel killed was one Gashita has failed to kill for over two weeks.
2	"Dariel Works His First Assignment as an Adventurer."; Transliteration: "Darieru, Bōkensha Toshite Hatsushigoto o Suru." (Japanese: ダリエル、冒険者として初仕事をする。)	Yūma Imura	Hitomi Amamiya	Yoshihide Yūzumi	January 14, 2023
Dariel is promoted for killing the monster and accepts a quiet herb-gathering quest but is perplexed when Marika insists on joining him, holding his hand, and doing most of the quest for him. Dariel notices Marika is skilled enough to be an adventurer; Marika claims she is scared of fighting and yet hunts monsters for food without a problem. Dariel settles into village life with Marika's romantic interest in him becoming more obvious. Envil reveals Gashita recklessly decided to hunt a Blaze Deathscythe, even though it is too high rank for him, and a team from a city guild has already accepted the official quest. Dariel volunteers to retrieve Gashita but finds him already running scared of the Deathscythe. Dariel's sword is broken so he combines two Aura skills and throws a sword fragment into the Death scythe's mouth, killing it. Gashita realizes he has been a reckless idiot. Meanwhile, the four Demon Kings struggle in their war against the Hero as Dariel is secretly the one who keeps everything in the army running smoothly; without him, everything is falling apart, yet Bashverza furiously rejects his fellow Kings' requests to bring Dariel back.
3	"Dariel Goes to His Old Workplace."; Transliteration: "Darieru, Mukashi no Shokuba e Iku." (Japanese: ダリエル、昔の職場へ行く。)	Chuan Feng Xu	Hitomi Amamiya	Takashi Iida	January 21, 2023
Gashita begins following Dariel on his quests to learn from him. Marika's hugs begin to cause Dariel injuries. Dariel notices most houses in the village are vacant and Envil explains the village was a trade route for a nearby mithril mine, but since the demon army captured the mine trade stopped. Dariel, once the mine's overseer for the demon army, visits the mine and finds it being totally mismanaged by one of Bashvasa's new commanders. The Knockers, a demon sub-species suited to mining who all respect Dariel greatly, are tired of being repressed and begin a revolt. Dariel hides his face and protects the Knockers as an anonymous adventurer, defeating the demon soldiers non-fatally. The commander surrenders, revealing he isn't even a soldier, just a demon Bashverza randomly hired at a party. At Dariel's insistence, the commander resigns and the soldiers return home. The grateful Knockers decide to switch allegiance to the human race. The Adventurer Guild's main headquarters takes the Knockers under their protection to reopen the mine properly, making the village prosperous again. Marika hugs Dariel so hard he is tackled to the floor unconscious.
4	"Dariel Negotiates."; Transliteration: "Darieru, Kōshō Suru." (Japanese: ダリエル、交渉する。)	Ageha Kochōran	Hitomi Amamiya	Takashi Iida	January 28, 2023
Bashverza is punished by the Demon Lord for losing the mithril mine and his continued mismanagement of the army. Marika almost asks Dariel to marry her but is interrupted by Gashita arguing with Fitbitan, the arrogant leader of the adventurer team sent to hunt the Blaze Deathscythe. Gashita reveals that Dariel killed the Deathscythe, infuriating Fitbitan. Later, a misunderstanding results in Envil accepting a confused Dariel as Marika's fiancé. Guild headquarters ask Dariel to negotiate with the Knockers as they refuse to meet anyone else, but once Dariel reassures them the Knockers happily negotiate with Guild representative Bestfred. The demon Rizet is sent by the Demon Lord to convince the Knockers to return, but he encounters Dariel instead. Rizet reveals the demon army is near collapse due to Bashverza's incompetence and begs Dariel to return. Dariel refuses due to being human and instead has Rizet negotiate with Bestfred to buy mithril from the guild, reasoning that buying mithril is easier than starting a war over the mine. A furious Fitbitan tries to murder Rizet but is stopped by Dariel. Bestfred berates Fitbitan before agreeing to sell mithril to the demons. Dariel looks forward to future peace between demons and humans since both races are precious to him.
5	"Dariel Fights in a Duel."; Transliteration: "Darieru, Kettō Suru." (Japanese: ダリエル、決闘する。)	Yūma Imura	Hitomi Amamiya	Koichi Ohata	February 4, 2023
Bestfred asks Dariel to reopen the mithril foundry; however, Fitbitan has already claimed the foundry for the Campbell guild. The Central guild sends Smith, the greatest living mithril blacksmith, to work in the foundry. Smith refuses to work with Campbell guild blacksmiths due to Fitbitan's rudeness. Smith reveals he intends to forge the greatest mithril weapon of his career, customized for Dariel's unique Aura. Fitbitan tries to recruit Dariel to the Campbell guild to deny the Centre guild access to the mine, but Dariel refuses so Fitbitan challenges Dariel to a duel. Fitbitan reveals his smiths have forged a mithril sword and shield, and mocks the dagger that Smith forges for Dariel. However, Smith reveals it is the Hermes Blade, which with Dariel's Aura can become any shape, including a sword and whip. Fitbitan's inferior mithril is destroyed. Bestfred decides to arrest Fitbitan but Dariel, knowing Fitbitan was doing his best for his guild and teammates, insists Fitbitan be forgiven if he repairs the houses damaged in their duel. Bestfred offers Dariel a job at Central Guild, overheard by Marika. Later, Dariel contemplates the job offer clothed in a towel in a sauna. Marika, also dressed in a towel, joins the shocked Dariel, insisting they discuss something important.
6	"Dariel, Enveloped by Steam."; Transliteration: "Darieru, Yuge ni Tsutsumareru." (Japanese: ダリエル、湯気に包まれる。)	Chuan Feng Xu	Hitomi Amamiya	Koichi Ohata	February 11, 2023
Marika tells Dariel she will support his taking the Centre Guild job. Dariel had already decided not to go, causing Marika to cry tears of joy and they kissed. Bashverza visits his and Dariel's father, Granverza, who retired after being injured by the Hero. Bashverza is too ashamed to admit his failures so he claims Dariel is still working for him. Granverza attacks him, having known the truth already and demanding Bashverza find Dariel. Bashverza refuses and leaves to prove he can succeed without Dariel. Marika's mother sneakily confirms that Dariel and Marika spent the night together, leaving Dariel so weak he falls down the stairs. Dariel frets over whether to confess everything but before he can Envil announces he wishes Dariel to replace him as Chief. Dariel agrees and asks Marika to marry him. One year later Dariel is Chief, has married Marika, and had a son, Gran. The Hero visits the village. Dariel has mixed feelings as the Hero almost killed Granverza, but he finds the previous Hero has retired and been replaced by a young woman who is so new to the role she has notes for heroic behavior written on her hands. As it is her destiny to defeat the Demon Lord she has come to the village for mithril armor.
7	"Dariel Uses That One Skill."; Transliteration: "Darieru, Ano Waza o Tsukau." (Japanese: ダリエル、あの技を使う。)	Yūma Imura	Hitomi Amamiya	Yoshihide Yūzumi	February 18, 2023
The Hero, Lady, and her subordinates Satome and Sessha, are entranced by the mithril weaponry. Lady announces she is seeking a third subordinate and is accepting challengers. Gashita comes close to winning but Dariel is forced to save his life when Lady almost kills Gashita by accident. Lady duels and is defeated by Dariel, but is confused when he rejects her invitation to join her party. Dariel recalls Lady Droyes, one of the Demon Kings who valued peace above everything and is determined not to help Lady defeat the Demon Lord. Lady begins stalking Dariel and slowly realizes Dariel values life over war. She begs him to join her once more but Dariel refuses, revealing the demon army only exists to protect the Demon Lord from the Hero and has never once started a war with humans as it was always the Hero who attacked first. Lady relents and asks Dariel to be her mentor. Dariel agrees, hoping to steer Lady away from war altogether. Droyes is despondent Dariel is still missing as Bashverza has not attempted to manage the army in months. Meanwhile, Rizet visits Dariel but is followed by Zebiantes, one of the four Demon Kings, who finally locates Dariel.
8	"Dariel Tends to Many Matters."; Transliteration: "Darieru, Honsō Suru." (Japanese: ダリエル、奔走する。)	Ageha Kochōran	Hitomi Amamiya	Koichi Ohata	February 25, 2023
Zebiantes punishes Rizet and confronts Dariel but decides to behave after witnessing Marika's suppressed rage. Zebiantes decides to take over responsibility for the mithril contract from Rizet but Dariel refuses to work with her. Zebiantes challenges Dariel to a duel but loses comically fast. During the fight, Dariel accidentally snatches Zebiantes' panties and is forced to sell her a mithril weapon to not tell Marika. While Zebiantes visits the foundry to have a weapon forged Dariel is forced to distract Lady so she won't meet Zebiantes, only for the two to meet anyway at the sauna. Dariel is forced to admit everything about his past, having already done so to Marika before their wedding. Marika prevents a fight from breaking out so Zebiantes and Lady decide on a duel. After a restless night, the two meet with their mithril weapons, Lady a sword, and Zebiantes a Wind Magic necklace. The two are evenly matched until they almost collapse a cliff onto Gran and both save him. With the duel over the two realize they actually had fun together and become friends. Dariel hopes such friendships will lead to the peace he longs for between humans and demons. Later the village is visited by Alanzir, the retired previous hero.
9	"Dariel Has a Reunion."; Transliteration: "Darieru, Saikai Suru." (Japanese: ダリエル、再会する。)	Ageha Kochōran	Hitomi Amamiya	Koichi Ohata	March 4, 2023
Far from the bloodthirsty warrior Dariel remembers Alanzir appears as a kindly old man. Alanzir plans to resume Lady's training but learning Dariel has also been training Lady he asks to spar with him. Dariel unhappily agrees but Zebiantes accidentally uses demon magic, exposing herself and Alanzir tries to kill her. Dariel is forced to save Zebiantes, informing Alanzir that peaceful demons are welcome in his village. Sensing Dariel's strength Alanzir offers to have Dariel replace Lady as the Hero. Dariel refuses so Alanzir injures him, demanding to know why Dariel wants peace with demons. Dariel reveals he was raised by demons. Granverza meets the Demon Lord and begs him to fire Bashverza who has not left his room in over a year. The Demon Lord is unhappy Granverza blatantly prefers the human Dariel over Bashverza but he gives Granverza Dariel's location, having known it all along. Granverza recalls 33 years ago the former Water Demon King Bezetan was slain by Alanzir, but he left Granverza the perfect weapon to one day kill Alanzir, the baby Dariel. Alanzir abruptly reveals Dariel must be his long-lost son, kidnapped by Bezetan as a baby. Before Dariel can react to this revelation Granverza arrives.
10	"Dariel, Showered in Sparks."; Transliteration: "Darieru, Hinoko o Abiru." (Japanese: ダリエル、火の粉を浴びる。)	Chuan Feng Xu	Hitomi Amamiya	Akari Ranzaki	March 11, 2023
Alanzir cannot forgive that Granverza got to be a father while he did not. Granverza never knew Dariel was Alanzir's son as Bezetan never told him. They almost fight until Marika interrupts, actually scolding a Hero and a Demon King for upsetting their grandson. Meeting Gran the two grandfathers make peace. Bashverza finally reappears, claiming to have the plan to defeat the Hero, only to find he will soon be fired and all anyone can talk about is Dariel. Bashverza decides to kill Dariel. During a party, Envil is nervous about being joint grandfathers with Alanzir the Hero and Granverza the Demon King, but Dariel feels hopeful when they start getting along. Lady asks about her training but due to their new circumstances, Alanzir admits the Demon Lord isn't the cause of humanity's suffering. The war was started by humanity's leaders to seize the Demon Lord's ability to bestow magical powers, finally allowing humans to use magic. Lady decides to remain the Hero to expose the truth. The mine is attacked by a dragon so everyone rushes to help. Dariel realizes the Knockers are trapped and rushes to free them while Granverza and Alanzir distract the dragon.
11	"Dariel Has a Showdown."; Transliteration: "Darieru, Taiketsu Suru." (Japanese: ダリエル、対決する。)	Yūma Imura	Hitomi Amamiya	Koichi Ohata	March 18, 2023
Realising the Knockers will be in danger as long as the dragon is nearby Dariel joins the fight. After knocking the dragon from the sky it flies away. Granverza returns home with Zebiantes and confronts Bashverza, revealing Bashverza controlled the dragon with forbidden hex magic he stole from the Demon Lord's vault. Granverza is enraged as Hexes affect the user's sanity. Still trying to prove his superiority over Dariel Bashverza flies away on the dragon to kill the heroes Alanzir and Lady. In the mine, Dariel is confronted by Gigantomachia the Magical Earth Beast. He is upset his friend Salamandra the Magical Fire Beast is suffering and, seeing Dariel has a good heart, improves his Hermes Blade since the mithril was mined from his body. Marika gives Dariel armored gloves and her wedding ring to keep him safe. Bashverza announces he will end the war by killing all humans, starting with his greatest failure, Dariel. As they duel Dariel acknowledges how hard Bashverza must have worked and how unfair it was that no one was proud of him. Enraged at being pitied Bashverza begins to turn into a dragon as the hex further joins him to Salamandra.
12	"Dariel Reaches Out His Hand."; Transliteration: "Darieru, Te o Nobasu." (Japanese: ダリエル、手を伸ばす。)	Chuan Feng Xu	Hitomi Amamiya	Fumitoshi Oizaki	March 25, 2023
The hex begins to affect Dariel, synchronizing their minds and dragging him into Bashverza's memories. Ever since Granverza brought Dariel home, Bashverza has felt like Dariel replaced him as Granverza's son. Even when it looked like he could work beside his father, Granverza retired and assigned Dariel as his aide instead. Dariel is deeply affected by Bashverza's loneliness, which only makes Bashverza angrier. Dariel draws Bashverza into his own memories, showing him his own loneliness over never fitting in as a demon and treasuring Bashverza as his younger brother. Bashverza realizes that his own stubbornness caused his pain and weeps, breaking the hex. Salamandra, free of the hex, prepares to rampage. Bashverza fuses with Salamandra's body to fly him far away at the cost of his life, but Granverza and Dariel work together to save him. Returning home victorious, Marika's hug almost kills Dariel. The Demon Lord exiles Bashverza for eternity so he visits Dariel and meets his nephew Gran. Gran speaks his first words, big brother Bashverza. Dariel commissions a family portrait, of humans, demons, and heroes together. Bashverza leaves to travel the world but promises to visit occasionally. Life in the village returns to peaceful normality.
