= Zetsumetsu Kigu Shōjo Amazing Twins =

2014 original video animation

絶滅危愚少女 Amazing Twins
- Genre: Supernatural, action
- Original video animation
- Directed by: Junichi Sato
- Written by: Mari Okada
- Music by: Conisch
- Studio: Encourage Films
- Released: February 26, 2014 – June 25, 2014
- Episodes: 2

Zetsumetsu Kigu Shōjo: Amazing Twins (絶滅危愚少女〜Amazing Twins〜; lit. Extinct Device Girl: Amazing Twins) is a two-part original video animation produced by Encourage Films and directed by Junichi Sato. The two parts were released on Blu-ray Disc and DVD on February 26 and June 25, 2014, respectively, whilst AT-X aired them on December 29, 2013, and May 6, 2014, respectively. The opening theme and ending themes are "Zetsumetsu Kigu Shōjo" (絶滅危愚少女) and "Kokoro Asymmetry" (心 アシンメトリー) respectively, both performed by Haruka Chisuga.

== Summary ==
The story takes place in a world where certain individuals possess a power called Incomprehensible Skill of Human beings (ISH), giving them supernatural powers. One of these individuals is Amane Todoroki, a straightforward and somewhat air-headed girl who works as an idol magician for a performance team called Nought. Amane has a twin sister named Lilianne who was born without a body. Unlike Amane, whose ISH is fairly weak, Lilianne is extremely powerful and is able to lend her power to Amane, who uses it in her Nought performances. Amane and Lilianne try to spread the joy of ISH powers via magic shows, but everything changes when Amane is approached by someone from IAM, a group that puts on magic shows like Nought's, but is secretly experimenting with ISH users.

== Characters ==
Amane Todoroki (等々力 あまね, Todoroki Amane)
Voiced by: Aya Uchida
The main character, a girl who possesses ISH. Her power is weak and she cannot control it very well, but she is able to use the power from her twin sister Lilianne, who possesses an extremely powerful ISH. Amane helps put on magic shows in the hopes that people will come to accept ISH users and give Lilianne's existence a sense of purpose.
Lilianne (リリアン, Ririan)
Voiced by: Satomi Satou
Amane's twin sister, who lost her body in her mother's womb. Due to her ISH ability she exists as a spirit form, often residing in the body of a stuffed bear. Despite being one of the most powerful ISH users, she cannot use her abilities by herself as she lacks a proper body. However, she is able to lend her power to Amane and can unleash her full power if she fully merges with her.
Aya (アヤ)
Voiced by: Nao Tōyama
A popular magician from the group IAM. She's an ISH user and is sent to investigate Amane's potential. Her ability allows her to create illusions.
Nanae Fudo (不動 奈々枝, Fudō Nanae)
Voiced by: Yumi Kakazu
The leader of Nought, a group of ISH users who use their powers in magic shows. She is a ISH user but has sealed her powers away. She inspired Amane to become a performer after covering for her when she used Lilianne's full power at a young age.
Hasudou (ハスドウ)
Voiced by: Susumu Chiba
A member of IAM, who is interested in Amane's potential. Unaware that Amane's powerful ISH comes from Lilianne, he believes her to be an archetype, which was thought to have been extinct.
Kazuki (和希)
Voiced by: Hiro Shimono
A performer at Nought who can talk to birds. He wants to excel at magic without using his ISH power.
Hirona (ひろな)
Voiced by: Miyu Matsuki
A performer at Nought who possesses superhuman strength.
Sentimental Takagi (センチメント 高木, Senchimento Takagi)
Voiced by: Ryou Hirohashi
An alcoholic fortune teller whom Amane often comes to for advice. She possesses the ISH ability to communicate with Earth, which she refers to as Gaia.
Kakeru Sennokura (千ノ倉 積, Sennokura Kakeru)
Voiced by: Sayaka Ohara
Amane's patron who is quite doting on Amane.
Kasuka Mochizumi (望月 幽, Mochizumi Kasuka)
Voiced by: Yuko Gibu
A friend of Kakeru.
Kozumi (こずみ)
Voiced by: Ai Kayano
A friend of Amane's and a fan of her magic shows. She comes to learn of Amane and Lilianne's powers after they save her from IAM.
Mana (まな)
Voiced by: Haruka Chisuga
Another fan of Amane's shows who is often seen with Kozumi.
Messiah Lady (メサイアレディ, Mesaia Redi)
Voiced by: Megumi Ogata
A fictional superheroine.

== Episode list ==
No.	Title	Original release date
1	"Welcome to our Show!" "Watashi-tachi no Shō Yōkoso!" (わたしたちのショウへようこそ!)	December 29, 2013(TV); February 26, 2014 (BD/DVD)
Amane Todoroki is a girl who possesses ISH, the ability to use certain supernatural powers. Whilst her own power is fairly weak, she is able to borrow power from Lilianne, her twin sister who was born without a body and now resides in a stuffed bear. Amane has been doing magic shows with a few other ISH users for a performance group called Nought, which has been declining in popularity. One day, Amane is approached by an ISH user named Aya, who comes from another performance group called IAM. Aya brings Amane to a deadly performance to push her ISH abilities to their full potential. Not satisfied, Aya has a man who had been forced to awaken ISH powers to kidnap Amane's friend Kozumi, forcing Amane to chase after her. When his powers start to go berserk, Amane and Lillianne combine into one, allowing Amane to fully use Lilianne's power, defeat the man, and rescue Kozumi safely. After Amane passes out from exhaustion, Lilianne shows her true form to Kozumi, begging her not to hate Amane, to which she responds that she has simply become an even bigger fan of hers.
2	"Welcome to our Dream!" "Watashi-tachi no Yume Yōkoso!" (わたしたちの夢へようこそ!)	May 6, 2014(TV); June 25, 2014 (BD/DVD)
Upon having her ISH abilities analysed, Amane is warned that if she and Lilianne were to keep fusing, Lilianne would disappear. Later, Amane and Lilianne encounter Aya and attempt to get her to change her ways, with no luck. The next day, Aya appears again and attacks Amane with an illusionary monster during a show. With Amane powers alone not enough to win against Aya, Lilianne suggests they should fuse, assuring Amane she will undo the fusion before she disappears. Using an illusionary paper airplane, Amane and Lilianne take to the sky and escapes Aya's illusion, arriving at her house. There they are shown visions of Aya's memories, showing how she was looked down upon in her childhood due to her ISH powers. With Aya's real body shielded by a powerful barrier of emotions, Nought's leader, Nanae Fudo, supported by Amane and Lilianne using their fusion, break her free from her memories. Afterwards, Amane is unable to get a response from Lilianne. Fearing she has disappeared, her cries bring Lilianne back to her bear body. Free from her feelings of hatred, Aya decides to join Amane as a member of Nought, and together they put on a fitting finale to their show.
