= Etotama =

Japanese anime television series

えとたま
- Genre: Comedy, Fantasy
- Created by: Shirogumi; Tablier Communications
- Manga
- Written by: Takashi Hoshi; Tōru Zekū
- Illustrated by: Hiroma Hino
- Published by: ASCII Media Works
- Magazine: Dengeki Daioh
- Original run: January 2014 – January 2016
- Volumes: 3
- Anime television series
- Directed by: Fumitoshi Oizaki; Takamitsu Hirakawa (CG)
- Written by: Deko Akao
- Music by: Azusa Kikuchi
- Studio: Shirogumi; Encourage Films
- Licensed by: NA: Ponycan USA
- Original network: Tokyo MX, Sun TV, BS11, AT-X
- Original run: April 9, 2015 – June 25, 2015
- Episodes: 12
- Original net animation

Etotama ~Nyan-Kyaku Banrai~
- Directed by: Fumitoshi Oizaki
- Written by: Deko Akao
- Music by: Azusa Kikuchi
- Studio: Shirogumi; Encourage Films
- Released: May 25, 2021

Etotama (えとたま; "Chinese Zodiac Spirits") is a Japanese anime television series produced by Encourage Films and Shirogumi, which aired from April 9 to June 25, 2015. A manga adaptation began serialization from December 2013 in ASCII Media Works's shōnen manga magazine Dengeki Daioh. A 30-minute original net animation (ONA) episode titled Etotama ~Nyan-Kyaku Banrai~ premiered on May 25, 2021.

== Plot ==
The anime's story revolves around Nya-tan, the cat of Chinese astrology who wants to become a member of the Chinese zodiac. Nya-tan is simple and suffers from memory loss, and she tries various idiotic ways to become a member. She meets Takeru Tendo, a high school student who lives alone in Akihabara, and becomes a freeloader at his house. Little by little, she gets closer to her goal.

Sol/Lull is the source of the Eto-musume's life force. Sol/Lull is the embodiment of proper human emotions, it's a type of energy only humans possess, like Takeru Amato. Every time a human feels grateful, Sol/Lull appears. And when Sol/Lull collects into an Eto-musume's soul, their Etotama, they transform from adult mode, the form that allows then to exist in the human world, to the form that allows them to fight in the Eto world, pretty mode.

== Characters ==
Nya-tan (にゃ〜たん) (sometimes stylized as Nyaa-tan)
Voiced by: Rie Murakawa
Eto-Musume of the Cat, she's the heroine of the Etotama series. She is part of the Chinese astrology. Her goal is to become one of the twelve Zodiac Gods, and she tries various ways to become a member. She then meets Takeru Amato, a high school student who lives alone in Akihabara, and ends up living is his house and becoming a freeloader. Nya-tan is a girl that has a quite chubby and cute face. She has medium length, straight light brown hair and brown, goldish eyes. She accessorizes her hair with a big yellow ribbon at the back and a yellow star with an upside down happy face on it on the side of her hair. Her clothing consist of a collar that comes with a golden bell, a white shirt with a sailor-like blue ribbon/necktie and a slightly darker blue skirt with another huge ribbon behind it. She also wears blue and white cuffs around her wrists and brown shoes that come with knee-length blue and white stockings with flowers on the side. Like all the other Zodiac Girls, Nya-tan also has two ears - cat ears in her case, and a thin, white tail. "A natural fool with a innocent personality that does not give up." Nya-tan is a very bright and cheerful and kind girl and also quite childish, which explains why she often says jokes and plays around. She can however be shy sometimes and she is sort-of-an airhead, so Takeru has to watch over her. When she finds something she wants to do, she doesn't stop until she has reached it, and she is always straight toward the goal she is aiming for. Cat Gun (苗弾丸(キャット・ガン), Kyatto Gan) is Nya-tan's special attack. It's not a gun, but more like a laser with cat palm on it. It is used in the second episode, against Moo-tan.
Very little is known about Nya-tan's past because she has amnesia (Episode 2), but she always wanted to be a member of the zodiac gods. Although her and Takeru's relationship has not been shown so much, it seems like they are on friendly terms, and Nya-tan called him by his first name when she first met him. She is ranked at the very bottom under her friend, Uri-tan. She must battle and get all 12 seals to become an Eto-shin. She wins Moo-tan's seal in episode 2 and Usa-tan's seal in episode 4. Mei-tan gives her seal in episode 5, while she obtains Shima-tan, Kii-tan and Inu-tan's seals in episode 6 and Shaa-tan gives her seal in episode 7. Piyo-tan gives her seal in Episode 8, but forgets afterwards.

In her battle form, Nya-tan has a white cat-hat, with green ears in it, and also a happy face on it. She also has white boots with flowers on it, instead of brown shoes. She also seems to have a thicker tail. Nya-tan's appearance in the manga is the same as in the anime.

Takeru Amato (天戸 タケル, Amato Takeru)
Voiced by: Hiro Shimono
The main protagonist of the anime, he's a normal high school student who moves to a house in Akihabara and meets Nya-tan and the Eto-Shin. With praise, he gives off "Sol/Lull" which is the life source the Zodiac need. Takeru is a young, tall high school student. He has short black hair that reaches his chin, and he has red glasses that he wears over his amethyst eyes. He wears a white shirt with black sleeves that show a tiny bit of white at the edges and two orange diamonds over-lapping each other, one lighter than the other, and four black-and-white chess-like squares at the bottom of his shirt and at the folded bit at the top. To finish it off he wears a red tie that has the black-and-white squares at the bottom. Then, he finishes the look off again with a pair of black pants and light-gray shoes. Out of all of the free-loaders, Takeru can probably be considered the only 'normal' person in here that holds common sense. Even through this, he takes everything quite nicely and doesn't seem to mind most things. He can also be considered languid by some people. Even though this, he is a quite benevolent. Also, most people would see him as a comedic 'Straight Man' with Nya-tan as his partner. Takeru and Nya-tan get along in a bit of a like-hate relationship. Sometimes, Takeru is grateful for the kind acts she does but once he figures out the hidden meaning, all of his respect immediately goes down the drain. He finds her a bit less than tolerable and always ends up with an anger vein popping out due to her actions. Out of all of the Zodiac Girls, Takeru and Uri-tan enjoy their conversations with each other, and Takeru always relies on her to explain everything that's going on, like the ETM12. He also seems to treat Uri-tan a bit like his younger sister, due to everyone making her the mascot of the Zodiac Gods and doing the same, but it is barely noticeable and he mostly treats her on the same level as everyone else. Takeru tolerates Uri-tan more than everyone else due to knowing her about as long as Nya-tan. Both Dora-tan and Takeru can tolerate each other's presence and have nothing against each other. At first, Takeru had been a little wary of her after he had nearly been hit by her attack but when he realized the plot that Nyaa-tan had created, he eventually felt more comfortable. Dora-tan had commented that he was an 'interesting human' to the other Zodiac Girls, proving that she and Takeru were on good terms.

Chuu-tan (チュウたん)
Voiced by: Sayaka Ohara
Eto-Shin of the Rat. She is ranked at #1. She protects the Southern Kanto region. Chu-tan has long, straight, but somewhat spiky, light purple hair and sharp, dark red eyes. On her forehead, she has light purple crystals. She gives off a menacing look. Being the zodiac's rat, she has two rat-ears, and also a tail. She wears an unzipped purple racing suit, although a short scene in Episode 7 showed her in a white Kimono in one of Nya-tan's memories, and she also wears a yellow necklace. Very little is known about Chu-tan's personality, but she seems to have something against Nya-tan, as she wants to destroy the cat clan. She also seems to be calm and mature, and she also seems to be very strong, wiping out many people in the Eto world. It later revealed that she is a Eto-shin, and the strongest. When she appears in episode 3, she claims that she can not let the cat clan live. She is the most dangerous of all the Eto-shin. One of the four Eto-shin, (Her, Piyo-tan, Usa-tan, and Uma-tan) who is against the Cat joining the Zodiac.
In her battle form, Chu-tan has a black rat-hat, with purple eyes, and she also has slightly shorter hair. Except that, her battle form is the same as her original look.

Moo-tan (モ～たん)
Voiced by: Eriko Matsui
Eto-Shin of the Ox. She is ranked at #2. She protects the Tokai region. Moo-tan is a tall busty girl that has wavy pink hair that falls beneath her hips. She has bright pink eyes and gives off a playful air. Being the zodiac's ox; she has two elf-like ears sticking out from her hair, and she also has a piercing on one of her ears, and she also has an ox's tail. She also wears an ox/cow hat. Moo-tan is a cheerful airhead that doesn't take into account her surroundings as much as the other zodiac girls. However, she is very friendly and gentle. Despite being friendly and gentle, Moo-tan is quite perverted and hyper, but she is also quite strong and clever when it comes down to fighting, shown in episode 2. She loses her seal to the cat in episode 2. As seen in episode 4, she is considered too perverted of an Eto-shin to be included in the Nya-tan issue, having her own category. She seems to be quite attached to Nya-tan. Moo-tan always wants to cuddle with her, and Moo-tan herself said that she loves her. This, however, makes Nya-tan irritated sometimes, but they are on good and friendly terms.
In her battle form, Moo-tan has a cow-hat, that has a piercing on the nose. She also has the same clothing as her original one. Moo-tan's appearance in the manga is the same as in the anime.

Shima-tan (シマたん)
Voiced by: Yuiko Tatsumi
Eto-Shin of the Tiger. Her rank is #3. She protects the Kinki region. She has straight, braided black hair, tied with a red ribbon at the bottom which falls below her shoulders. Shima-tan also has bright red eyes. Being the zodiac's tiger, she has tiger-like clothes, tiger ears and tail. One of the 3 Eto-shin,(Her, Dora-tan, and Uri-tan), who are in favor of the Cat joining the Zodiac, seen in episode 4. At first glance, Shima-tan seems like a friendly and gentle girl (which she really is), but she is rather very playful and hyper, and quite strong, hitting Uri-tan with her hands and leaving damage (despite Uri-tan being fragile). But she is naturally calm.
In her battle form, Shima-tan has a tiger-hat, that seems to have quite an angry face. Also, her shoes are 'rounder'. Besides that, her pretty mode form is like her original look.

Usa-tan (ウサたん)
Voiced by: Yūka Aisaka
Eto-Shin of the Rabbit. She is ranked at #4. She protects the Hokuriku region. Usa-tan has long, straight blonde hair that curls at the bottom and bright teal eyes. She has tall bunny-ears and has on a blue and golden waist coat with a golden clock that hangs off of it. Underneath she wears a type of white women's leotard and grey tights, paired with red flats. Usa-tan is a princess-type and doesn't care if the spotlight is on her or not. She also seems to have a daring side, standing up on top of Takeru's luggage with no care at all. Although this, she prefers to act and talk like a lady and is quite the genius when it comes to business. She has her own Production company. She apparently likes developing the character of the Eto-Shin. She loses to the Cat in episode 4 and gives up her seal. She works in the Maid café like the others. As seen in episode 4, she is shown on a white board in Takeru's house as one of the 4 against the Cat joining the Zodiac.
In her battle form, Usa-tan has a white rabbit-hat, with a yellow ribbon on it. Her pretty mode is quite different from her original look; she has a blue, long dress with white in it. She has a yellow ribbon around her neck. Usa-tan also has knee-long white socks, with black shoes, with small, yellow ribbons on them.

Dora-tan (ドラたん)
Voiced by: Maaya Uchida
Eto-Shin of the Dragon. She is ranked at #5. She protects the Tosan region. Dora-tan is a young girl with light blue hair and teal eyes. Her hair is straight and quite short, reaching up only to her chest; she has her hair tied into two ponytails, laid on her shoulders with white hair-clips at the bottom, and she wears circular glasses. She also has deer-like horns, which is seen pointing out from her head, and at her back, she have a lizards tail.
Her clothing is quite similar to Uma-tan with the only difference being the colours and the pattern. Dora-tan is always seen wearing a dark blue-greenish skirt that has yellow flowers on the bottom right, tied up by a ribbon, and a green kimono underneath. She also wears light brown heels and a darker shade of brown socks.
Dora-tan has a kind personality and always seems to give off an aura of friendliness. She also seems to care for people and has the most 'real' emotions out of all of the Zodiac Girls. Also, she has a knack for teaching which is shown when she explained first-rate Sol/Lull. She also seems to be sly and sneaky, turning Takeru into an auction item.
Considering Dora-tan is Nyaa-tans mentor on the art of Sol/Lull and Mental Strength, both of them are on pretty good terms and have developed a strong bond of friendship. Dora-tan finds Nyaa-tan OK and thinks that she has the most chance of being a Zodiac God.
At first, Takeru was wary of Dora-tan's presence, since she played the 'Enemy' role but once he found out the plan all along, he finds her tolerable. In return, Dora-tan finds Takeru an 'interesting human' and comes through the FukaFuka hole with the other Zodiacs. Is the first Eto-shin to fight Nya-tan, though only to demonstrate their abilities to Takeru in episode 1. One of the 3 Eto-shin who are in favor of the Cat joining the Zodiac, as seen in episode 4.
In her battle form, Dora-tan has a green dragon-hat. She has the same clothing as her original one. However, in her pretty mode, she has yellow hair-clips instead of white ones, and also black laces on her shoes. Dora-tan's appearance in the manga is the same as in the anime.

Shaa-tan (シャアたん)
Voiced by: Hitomi Nabatame
Eto-Shin of the Snake. She is ranked at #6. She protects the Chugoku region. Shaa-tan has long, past waist-length, silver hair, she has a piece of hair pointing up, that curls at the tip, and she also wears a snake-headband which was shown to move and turn Nya-tan into stone in Episode 7. She has golden eyes. She is also usually seen with make-up, and Shaa-tan wears Middle Eastern type clothes. She is a calm, caring person shrouded in mystery, also has a confusing sense of humor. She is one of the 4, (Her, Mei-tan, Kii-tan, and Inu-tan) who "don't mind" if the Cat joins the Zodiac.
In her battle form, Shaa-tan has a very long red-purple snake-hat, going down to her feet. Besides that, her pretty mode is like her original look.

Uma-tan (ウマたん)
Voiced by: Ari Ozawa
Eto-Shin of the Horse. She is ranked at #7. She protects the Kyushu region. Uma-tan has long, purple-black hair that goes well past her waist and is tied up with a horse-shoe and orange eyes. She wears a red skirt which is held up by a light pink ribbon and has a kimono under it. For foot-wear, she wears the traditional sandals and white socks. Also, Uma-tan holds a broom which has a chess piece-like white horse on the top of it and a strawberry key-chain attached to the broom. Since she's a Zodiac Girl, she has two brown horse ears and a tail.
Uma-tan is very sensitive and thinks quite negatively, thinking that she is the reason all of the other zodiacs don't get remembered and becomes hard to deal with. She is also known to be timid due her lacking self-confidence, and she also worries quite a lot and apologizes very often, sometimes even for nothing. She is also a dreamer and tries to live up to it but many times she ends up in failure. She is also a little clumsy and troublesome, but underneath all of that, she is a kind-hearted and very friendly girl who cares for all Zodiac. Is one of the 4 that are against the cat joining the Zodiac, albeit for a yet unknown reason.
In her battle form, Uma-tan has a horse-hat, decorated with yellow and white flowers in various sizes. She also has the same clothing as her original one. However, in her battle-form, she has red sandals instead of golden ones.

Mei-tan (メイたん)
Voiced by: Mai Fuchigami
Eto-Shin of the Sheep. She is ranked at #8. She protects the Hokkaido region. Mei-tan is young girl below average height and build-- with a cute and childish-looking face. She has short, straight pink hair and a pair of big emerald green eyes and fair skin. She wears a nurse uniform. Being the zodiac gods sheep; she has quite fluffy hair, and two elf-like ears sticking out from her hair, and she also has a pair of horns of each side of her head. She's the third Eto-Musume to have no tail. Mei-tan is a very friendly, sweet and gentle girl. She will help anyone in need, and forgives people quickly. She specializes in the recovery system, and is responsible for any healing. She develops a crush for Takeru and is sometimes distracted when thinking about him.
In her battle form, Mei-tan has a white, fluffy sheep hat with another nurse hat on it. Besides that, she has the same clothing as her original look.

Kii-tan (キーたん)
Voiced by: Megumi Toda
Eto-Shin of the Monkey. She is ranked at #9. She protects the Northern Kanto region. (Her name is sometimes spelled "Key-tan") Kii-tan has short, yellow hair, with a piece standing up. Her hair is usually tied up into a pony tail at the side with a pink hawaii flower. She has light-brown amberish eyes and fair skin as well as two monkey ears and a tail. Her clothes consist of a yellow crop top surrounded by a black stripe at the bottom and a yellow skirt with some short black leggings and a pair of black uggs with red fur to finish the look off. Kii-tan is an owner of positive thinking, knowing how to speak and act, so she is well mannered, but she also is a naughty girl who is very curious and pure. Even if she is well-mannered, she has a mischievous side and enjoys fooling around with Inu-tan. She is also very impulsive and naïve but makes up for it with her trait of 'always learning from mistakes. Despite them both arguing and having disagreements, Kii-tan and Inu-tan seem to be like sisters to each other, their antics ranging from messing with each other to unintentionally synchronizing with each other. :They both seem like best friends and both of them seem to have a twin-bond.
In her battle form, Kii-tan has a monkey-hat. She has the same clothing as her original one, however, in her battle-form, she has brown leggings instead of black ones.
Another Eto-shin who "doesn't mind" if the Cat joins the Zodiac as seen in episode 4.

Piyo-tan (ピヨたん)
Voiced by: Mikoi Sasaki
Eto-Shin of the Rooster. She is ranked at #10. She protects Tohoku region. Piyo-tan has long, wavy light blue hair that falls beneath her hips and somewhat sharp, red eyes. Being the zodiac's rooster, Piyo-tan has two wings sticking out from her head, and also a big feather-like in the back, and she also wears a pink ribbon at her neck. Piyo-tan has a calm personality, but she is also very mature. She is however strict and doesn't like when Nyaa-tan teases her because of her short term memory loss after taking three steps. She calls Nya-tan 'stupid cat'. She feels that's it's easy to accumulate negative emotions. Taking 3 steps will cause her to lose memory, only remembering that she doesn't like Nya-tan, so she's always flying. Nya-tan and Piyo-tan have a like-hate relationship. They sometimes do get along, but Nya-tan likes to tease Piyo-tan which results in Piyo-tan getting angry at her.
In her battle form, Piyo-tan has a yellow chicken-hat, that seems to have quite angry face, and she also have much shorter hair. She wears a yellow dress with orange edges, and she also wears a pink, small ribbon around her neck, formed like wings. She wears dark blue pants, and yellow shoes with orange edges, like the dress, light brown wings on each side of the shoe and to finish the look. It's also black at the tip.

Inu-tan (イヌたん)
Voiced by: Mariko Honda
Eto-Shin of the Dog. She is ranked at #11. She protects the Shikoku region. She's always with Kii-tan. One of the Eto-shin who "doesn't mind" if the Cat joins the Zodiac as seen in episode 4. Inu-tan has a quite tomboyish style. She has short, straight brown hair with small caramel highlights and red eyes with a plaster on her cheek. She is almost always seen with an orange shirt with the kanji for 'dog' on it, shorts jeans and long, white stockings as well as light brown shoes. Also, as a reference towards her place as the Dog Zodiac - Inu-tan wears a black collar on her neck and two black cuffs on her wrists. She also bears two dog ears and a tail. "No front or back, she's just honest and pure." Inu-tan is a very kind and energetic girl. She gets along well with Nya-tan. Although she has a temper that can blow up easily, she is honest with her friends and her aura gives off childishness as well as pureness. She also seems to say most things in sync with Kī-tanand when she's not, she is most likely talking to her or fooling around with her. Even if she's down, most of the time she will try to be positive. Despite them both arguing and having disagreements, Ki-tan and Inu-tan seem to be like sisters to each other, their antics ranging from messing with each other to unintentionally synchronizing with each other. They both seem like best friends and both of them seem to have a twin-bond.
In her battle form, Inu-tan has a light brown dog-hat. Also, Inu-tan has red shoes with yellow laces instead of light brown shoes with black laces. Besides that, she has the same clothing as her original look.

Uri-tan (ウリたん)
Voiced by: Yumiri Hanamori
Eto-Shin of the Boar. She is ranked at #12. She protects the Okinawa region. Uri-tan is a small, cute girl with big teal eyes. She has mid-length greyish hair, tied into twin tails with pink-red ribbons on each side. She has a petite build, and can be considered quite short as well. Her clothing consists of a pink dress decorated with flowers and hearts and orange arm-warmers that reach up to somewhere around her triceps. She also wears small black shoes with yellowish-orange socks past her ankles and end with small little pinkish-red ribbons that match the ones in her hair. Also, being the pig zodiac, she has small little orange ears but unlike some of the other Zodiac Girls, she does not bear a tail. In Episode 3, she intervenes in the battle between the Rat and Cat and gets killed, only to be reincarnated in Episode 4. She was given a lecture for intervening in the battle between the Rat and Cat. She is one of 4 who are in favor of the Cat joining the Zodiac.
In her battle form, Uri-tan has an orange boar-hat. She also wears a red ribbon around her neck, and she also wears light pink shorts. Except that, her battle form is the same as her original look.

== Media ==
=== Anime ===
==== Episode list ====
No.	Title	Original release date
1	"The Exuberant Cat Girl"; Transliteration: "Neko yōyō" (Japanese: 猫娘揚々)	April 9, 2015
2	"A Strange and Loving Ox Relationship"; Transliteration: "Aien ki gyū" (Japanese: 愛縁奇牛)	April 16, 2015
3	"Reckless Heart"; Transliteration: "Chototsu mōshin" (Japanese: 亥突猛心)	April 23, 2015
4	"Eyes of a Rabbit, Ears of a Rabbit"; Transliteration: "Tomoku Toji" (Japanese: 兎目兎耳)	April 30, 2015
5	"Nutritious Sheep Fortifacation"; Transliteration: "Jiyō kyōsō" (Japanese: 滋羊強壮)	May 7, 2015
6	"The Three Laughers of the Tiger's Scheme"; Transliteration: "Kokei sanshō" (Japanese: 虎計三笑)	May 14, 2015
7	"A Long, Serpentine Fate"; Transliteration: "En en chōda" (Japanese: 縁縁長蛇)	May 21, 2015
8	"An Equestrian Fit for a Cat"; Transliteration: "Ikkitō nyan" (Japanese: 一騎当猫)	May 28, 2015
9	"The Beauty of Flowers, Bird Steps, and Moon"; Transliteration: "Kachō Fugetsu" (Japanese: 花鳥歩月)	June 4, 2015
10	"Eternal Pervert"; Transliteration: "Eikyū hentai" (Japanese: 永久変態)	June 11, 2015
11	"Cat/Rat Shuffle"; Transliteration: "Byōso idō" (Japanese: 猫鼠異道)	June 18, 2015
12	"Eto In Full Bloom"; Transliteration: "Eto ryōran" (Japanese: 干支繚乱)	June 25, 2015

A spin-off anime called Etotama -Kids was presented at the Content Tokyo 2016 tradeshow.
