= Akuma-kun =

Manga series by Shigeru Mizuki

- First tankōbon volume cover

悪魔くん
- Manga
- Written by: Shigeru Mizuki
- Published by: Toshansha
- Original run: 1963 – 1964
- Volumes: 3
- Manga
- Written by: Shigeru Mizuki
- Published by: Kodansha
- Magazine: Weekly Shōnen Magazine
- Original run: 1966 – 1967
- Volumes: 1
- Manga
- Written by: Shigeru Mizuki
- Published by: Shueisha
- Magazine: Weekly Shōnen Jump
- Original run: 1970 – 1971
- Volumes: 1
- Television drama
- Produced by: Shinichi Yamazaki (NET)
- Music by: Takeo Yamashita
- Studio: Toei Company
- Original network: NET
- Original run: October 6, 1966 – March 30, 1967
- Episodes: 26
- Anime television series

Devil Boy
- Directed by: Junichi Sato
- Music by: Nozomi Aoki
- Studio: Toei Animation
- Original network: ANN (TV Asahi)
- Original run: April 15, 1989 – March 24, 1990
- Episodes: 42
- Original net animation
- Directed by: Junichi Sato (Note: Credited as Chief Director (総監督, Sō Kantoku)); Fumitoshi Oizaki
- Produced by: Daichi Nagatomi
- Written by: Hiroshi Ōnogi
- Music by: Akio Izutsu
- Studio: Encourage Films (animation); Toei Animation (production)
- Licensed by: Netflix
- Released: November 9, 2023
- Runtime: 21–28 minutes
- Episodes: 12

Akuma-kun (悪魔くん; lit. 'Demon-kun') is a Japanese manga series written and illustrated by Shigeru Mizuki. Several versions of the manga exist, one of which was adapted into a live-action television series which aired on NET and its affiliates from October 1966 to March 1967, a television film which aired on Fuji Television in 1985 and an anime television series titled in English as Devil Boy which aired from April 1989 to March 1990 on the same network, by this point renamed to TV Asahi.

In addition, two movies were spawned from the anime television series: Akuma-kun: The Movie released in 1989 and Akuma-kun: Yōkoso Akuma Land e!! released in 1990.

An original net animation (ONA) series was released in November 2023 on Netflix.

== Basic setting ==
In this series, the contents vary from version to version. The common plot points of every adaptation are listed below.

- The protagonist is a child prodigy who appears once every 10,000 years. The protagonist is always nicknamed "Akuma-kun". The works are roughly divided into three series with different protagonists: Ichiro Matsushita in the rental version, Shingo Yamada in the Shonen Magazine version, and Shingo Umoregi in the Comic Bonbon version
- Akuma-kun wants to create a world where all human beings can live happily, and he believes that harnessing the power of demons is necessary for him to achieve that goal. Additionally, the entities referred to as demons in the series are not limited to that of Christian origins, rather the series features various monsters described in myths and folk stories from all around the world.
- At the beginning of the story, Akuma-kun has not yet succeeded in the summoning of demons, and has repeatedly conducted magical research and experiments. However Dr. Faust appears and teaches the secrets of summoning demons to Akuma-kun, and as a result he finally succeeds in invoking demons.
- In addition, Dr. Faust gives Akuma-kun the Solomon Flute. This flute gives Akuma-kun the power to bend demons to his will. The flute was used by King Solomon.
- Akuma-kun has multiple subordinates who follow him. They are often referred to as the "twelve apostles". The twelve apostles also differ from series to series.
- To summon demons, Shingo, standing in front of a magic circle casts a spell, "エロイムエッサイム、我は求め訴えたり". (Eloim, Essaim, frugativi et appelavi.) This is a spell written in a grimoire spread in France during the 18th and 19th century.

== 1989 anime series ==
=== Characters ===
Shingo Umoregi (埋れ木 真吾) is a boy in fifth grade. He was nicknamed "Akuma-kun" by his friends due to his immense knowledge of demons and the occult. His father Shigeru Umoregi is a manga artist who struggles to sell his work. According to Faust, Shingo is said to be the Messiah, who appears once every ten thousand years to bring peace to the world.

=== Episodes ===
No.	Title	Directed by	Written by	Animation directed by	Art directed by	Original release date
1	"Invisible School in the Demon World!!"; Transliteration: "makai no mienai gakkou !!" (Japanese: 魔界の 見えない学校!!)	Junichi Sato	Takao Koyama	Fukuo Yamamoto	Yoshiyuki Shikano	April 15, 1989
2	"The Spell of Justice, Eloim Essaim"; Transliteration: "seigi no jumon, EROIMUESSAIMU" (Japanese: 正義の呪文、 エロイムエッサイム)	Katsumi Minoguchi	Takao Koyama	Masami Abe	Yoshiyuki Shikano	April 22, 1989
3	"Come out to the Magic Square, 12 Apostles"; Transliteration: "mahou jin ni, dedeyo 12 shito" (Japanese: 魔方陣に、 出でよ12使徒)	Shigeyasu Yamauchi	Yoshiyuki Suga	Masahiro Naoi	Ken'ichi Tajiri	April 29, 1989
4	"Kōmori-Neko's Trap"; Transliteration: "koumori neko no WANA" (Japanese: こうもり猫のワナ)	Susumu Ishizaki	Yoshiyuki Suga	Yasuhide Maruyama	Yoshiyuki Shikano	May 6, 1989
5	"Transformation of Wrath - Were-Tiger Makes His Appearance!!"; Transliteration: "ikari no henshin, ayatora no shutsugen !!" (Japanese: 怒りの変身、 妖虎の出現!!)	Masahiro Hosoda	Nobuaki Kishima	Nobuyoshi Sasakado	Ken'ichi Tajiri	May 13, 1989
6	"Why Are You Here, King of the Ancient Magical World?!"; Transliteration: "naze, kodai mahou kai no eiyuu ga !?" (Japanese: なぜ、 古代魔法界の英雄が!?)	Kazuhito Kikuchi	Takao Koyama	Kazue Kinoshita	Yoshiyuki Shikano	May 20, 1989
7	"The Hyakume Family and the Tragedy of the Moon People"; Transliteration: "hyaku moku ichizoku to higeki no tsukijin" (Japanese: 百目一族と 悲劇の月人)	Katsumi Minoguchi	Nobuaki Kishima	Masami Abe	Ken'ichi Tajiri	May 27, 1989
8	"May the Sound of Solomon's Flute Reach Your Heart!"; Transliteration: "kimi no kokoro ni, todoke SOROMON no fue !" (Japanese: 君の心に、 とどけソロモンの笛!)	Shigeyasu Yamauchi	Yoshiyuki Suga	Masahiro Naoi	Yoshiyuki Shikano	June 3, 1989
9	"The 12 Apostles of My Dreams are All Here!"; Transliteration: "yume no 12 shito ga zenin shuugou !!" (Japanese: 夢の12使徒が 全員集合!!)	Susumu Ishizaki	Nobuaki Kishima	Yasuhide Maruyama	Yoshiyuki Shikano	June 10, 1989
10	"Legend of the Witch! Fear Will Ambush You in the Manor of Illusions!"; Transliteration: "majo densetsu ! kyoufu ga machibuseru maboroshi no kan" (Japanese: 魔女伝説!恐怖が 待ち伏せる幻の館)	Masahiro Hosoda	Takao Koyama	Nobuyoshi Sasakado	Yoshiyuki Shikano	June 17, 1989
11	"The Beautiful Girl's Secret Hidden in the Portrait"; Transliteration: "shouzou ga ni kakusare ta bishoujo no himitsu" (Japanese: 肖像画に隠された 美少女の秘密)	Masayuki Akehi	Nobuaki Kishima	Kazue Kinoshita	Yoshiyuki Shikano	June 24, 1989
12	"The Demon Laughs at the Cracks in your Heart!"; Transliteration: "kokoro no sukima wo akuma ga warau" (Japanese: 心のすき間を 悪魔が笑う)	Directed by : Susumu Ishizaki; Storyboarded by : Masayuki Akehi	Yoshiyuki Suga	Masami Abe	Yoshiyuki Shikano	July 8, 1989
13	"Pushed to the Edge! The Super Demon Nanjamonja!"; Transliteration: "zettaizetsumei ! chou kaibutsu nanja monja" (Japanese: 絶体絶命! 超妖怪なんじゃもんじゃ)	Katsumi Minoguchi	Nobuaki Kishima	Masahiro Naoi	Yoshiyuki Shikano	July 15, 1989
14	"The King of Hell! The Twelve Apostles Wounded by Enma's Wrath!"; Transliteration: "jigoku no daiou ENMA no ikari ni kizutsuku 12 shito" (Japanese: 地獄の大王 エンマの怒りに 傷つく12使徒)	Susumu Ishizaki	Toyohiro Andō	Yasuhide Maruyama	Yoshiyuki Shikano	July 22, 1989
15	"The Slumbering Fairy Queen - Titania's Wish"; Transliteration: "nemureru mori no yousei ou TITANIA no negai" (Japanese: 眠れる森の妖精王 ティタニアの願い)	Shigeyasu Yamauchi	Yoshiyuki Suga	Nobuyoshi Sasakado	Yoshiyuki Shikano	July 29, 1989
16	"Kirara the Ice Fairy Sheds Rainbow Colored Tears"; Transliteration: "koori no yousei KIRARA ga nagasu niji shoku no namida" (Japanese: 氷の妖精キララが 流す虹色の涙)	Masahiro Hosoda	Nobuaki Kishima	Kazue Kinoshita	Yoshiyuki Shikano	August 5, 1989
17	"The Legendary Magic Mirror Animamudi's Prophecy?!"; Transliteration: "densetsu no ma kyou ANIMAMUDI no yogen !?" (Japanese: 伝説の魔鏡 アニマムディの予言!?)	Directed by : Susumu Ishizaki; Storyboarded by : Masayuki Akehi	Yoshiyuki Suga	Masami Abe	Yoshiyuki Shikano	August 12, 1989
18	"Time of Revelation! Emperor Dongyue's Secret!!"; Transliteration: "ima, akasareru higashi take taitei no himitsu !!" (Japanese: 今、明かされる 東嶽大帝の秘密!!)	Kazuhito Kikuchi	Toyohiro Andō	Yasuhiro Yamaguchi	Yoshiyuki Shikano	August 19, 1989
19	"Robbed of Solomon's Flute!!"; Transliteration: "ubawareta SOROMON no fue !!" (Japanese: 奪われたソロモンの笛!!)	Susumu Ishizaki	Nobuaki Kishima	Yasuhide Maruyama	Yoshiyuki Shikano	August 26, 1989
20	"Sedona From an Ocean Far Away"; Transliteration: "tooi umi kara kita SEDONA" (Japanese: 遠い海から来たセドナ)	Katsumi Minoguchi	Yoshiyuki Suga	Nobuyoshi Sasakado	Yoshiyuki Shikano	September 2, 1989
21	"The Black Magic Circle and Hedora the Witch"; Transliteration: "kuro mahoujin to majo HEDORA" (Japanese: 黒魔法陣と魔女ヘドラ)	Katsumi Minoguchi	Yoshiyuki Suga	Nobuyoshi Sasakado	Yoshiyuki Shikano	September 9, 1989
22	"Vanishing into the Demon Void Mystery of the Celestial Vessel"; Transliteration: "makuukan e kieru tenkuu sen no nazo" (Japanese: 魔空間へ消える 天空船の謎)	Directed by : Susumu Ishizaki; Storyboarded by : Masayuki Akehi	Yoshiyuki Suga	Masami Abe	Yoshiyuki Shikano	September 23, 1989
23	"Soar, O Wings of Hope!"; Transliteration: "habatake, kibou no tsubasa yo !" (Japanese: 羽ばたけ、希望の翼よ!)	Masahiro Hosoda	Yoshiyuki Suga	Satoru Iriyoshi	Yoshiyuki Shikano	September 30, 1989
24	"The Disappearing Invisible School!"; Transliteration: "kieta mienai gakkou !" (Japanese: 消えた見えない学校!)	Susumu Ishizaki	Nobuaki Kishima	Yasuhide Maruyama	Ken'ichi Tajiri	October 21, 1989
25	"Mischief Panic, Firework Ghosts!"; Transliteration: "itazura PANIKKU, hanabi yuurei !" (Japanese: いたずらパニック、花火幽霊!)	Kazuhito Kikuchi	Yoshiyuki Suga	Eisaku Inoue	Yoshiyuki Shikano	October 28, 1989
26	"Bird-Maiden and the Mystery of Easter Island"; Transliteration: "tori otome to IISUTAA tou no nazo" (Japanese: 鳥乙女とイースター島の謎)	Katsumi Minoguchi	Nobuaki Kishima	Nobuyoshi Sasakado	Ken'ichi Tajiri	November 4, 1989
27	"The House of Spirits! Our First Adventure!"; Transliteration: "seirei no ie, hyaku moku tachi no bouken" (Japanese: 精霊の家、百目たちの冒険)	Directed by : Susumu Ishizaki; Storyboarded by : Masayuki Akehi	Toyohiro Andō	Masami Abe	Minoru Ōkochi	November 11, 1989
28	"The World Navel, Crisis on Mount Penglai"; Transliteration: "sekai no HESO, houraijima no kiki" (Japanese: 世界のヘソ、蓬莢島の危機)	Shigeyasu Yamauchi	Yoshiyuki Suga	Kazue Kinoshita	Yoshiyuki Shikano	November 18, 1989
29	"「クモにされたメフィス2世!!」KUMO ni sareta MEFISUTO 2 sei !!"	Susumu Ishizaki	Nobuaki Kishima	Yasuhide Maruyama	Minoru Ōkochi	December 2, 1989
30	"「生命玉が応える12使徒の夢」seimei dama ga kotaeru 12 shito no yume"	Masayuki Akehi	Yoshiyuki Suga	Satoru Iriyoshi	Yoshiyuki Shikano	December 9, 1989
31	"「悪魔大使トン・フーチン」akuma taishi TON.FUUCHIN"	Kazuhito Kikuchi	Nobuaki Kishima	Eisaku Inoue	Yoshiyuki Shikano	December 16, 1989
32	"「奥様たちは魔女がお好き!?」okusama-tachi wa majo ga wo suki !?"	Directed by : Susumu Ishizaki; Storyboarded by : Junichi Sato	Yoshiyuki Suga	Masami Abe	Yoshiyuki Shikano	December 23, 1989
33	"「狙われたメフィスト2世」nerawareta MEFISUTO 2 sei"	Katsumi Minoguchi	Nobuaki Kishima	Nobuyoshi Sasakado	Minoru Ōkochi	January 13, 1990
34	"「生きかえれ!見えない学校」ikikaere ! mienai gakkou"	Susumu Ishizaki	Yoshiyuki Suga	Yasuhide Maruyama	Yoshiyuki Shikano	January 20, 1990
35	"「死後の世界を見せる 妖怪屋敷の不思議」shi go no sekai wo miseru youkai yashiki no fushigi"	Shigeyasu Yamauchi	Nobuaki Kishima	Kazue Kinoshita	Minoru Ōkochi	January 27, 1990
36	"「ようこそ悪魔博覧会へ」youko so akuma hakuran kai e"	Masayuki Akehi	Yoshiyuki Suga	Satoru Iriyoshi	Yoshiyuki Shikano	February 10, 1990
37	"「奪われた集魔玉、 地獄界の混乱!」ubawareta shuu ma dama, jigoku kai no konran !"	Directed by : Susumu Ichizaki; Storyboarded by : Junichi Sato	Toyohiro Andō	Masami Abe	Minoru Ōkochi	February 17, 1990
38	"「日本を襲う 霊魂爆弾の恐怖」nippon wo osou reikon bakudan no kyoufu"	Kazuhito Kikuchi	Yoshiyuki Suga	Eisaku Inoue	Yoshiyuki Shikano	February 24, 1990
39	"「ソロモンの鍵と 究極の六芒星」SOROMON no kagi to kyuukyoku no roku susuki boshi"	Susumu Ishizaki	Nobuaki Kishima	Yasuhide Maruyama	Minoru Ōkochi	March 3, 1990
40	"「地上に降りた 最強の悪魔軍団」chijou ni ori ta saikyou no akuma gundan"	Katsumi Minoguchi	Nobuaki Kishima	Kazuo Hayashi	Yoshiyuki Shikano	March 10, 1990
41	"「魔空間に突撃! 急げ、見えない学校」ma kuukan ni totsugeki ! isoge, mienai gakkou"	Shigeyasu Yamauchi	Nobuaki Kishima	Kazue Kinoshita	Minoru Ōkochi	March 17, 1990
42	"「最終回 夢よ、とどけ君の心に!」saishuu kai yume yo, todoke kimi no kokoro ni !"	Masayuki Akehi	Yoshiyuki Suga	Eisaku Inoue	Yoshiyuki Shikano	March 24, 1990

=== Movies ===
Both films are written by Yoshiyuki Suga and directed by Junichi Satō.

No.	Title	Animation directed by	Art directed by	Photography directed by	Production managed by	Original release date
1	"Akuma-kun: The Movie"; Transliteration: "Akuma-kun" (Japanese: 悪魔くん)	Kinichirō Suzuki	Iwamitsu Itō	Masahide Okino	Hiroshi Takeda & Munehisa Higuchi	July 15, 1989
2	"Akuma-kun: Welcome to Akuma Land!!"; Transliteration: "Akuma-kun: Yōkoso Akuma Land e!!" (Japanese: 悪魔くん ようこそ悪魔ランドへ!!)	Satoru Iriyoshi	Takamura Mukuo	Tadao Kubota	Hiroshi Meguro	March 10, 1990

== 2023 anime series ==
An original net animation (ONA) series was announced in March 2021, with director Junichi Sato returning from the previous anime series. It can be considered a sequel to the original series. Sato served as the chief director, with Fumitoshi Oizaki serving as the series director and Encourage Films animating the series with Toei Animation handling production duties. Hiroshi Ōnogi oversaw the scripts. The series was released worldwide on Netflix on November 9, 2023.

=== Episodes ===
No.	Title	Original release date
1	"Demons"; Transliteration: "Akuma" (Japanese: 悪魔)	November 9, 2023
2	"Gluttony"; Transliteration: "Donshoku" (Japanese: 貪食)	November 9, 2023
3	"Greed"; Transliteration: "Gōyoku" (Japanese: 強欲)	November 9, 2023
4	"Envy"; Transliteration: "Shitto" (Japanese: 嫉妬)	November 9, 2023
5	"Angel"; Transliteration: "Tenshi" (Japanese: 天使)	November 9, 2023
6	"Love and Hate"; Transliteration: "Aizō" (Japanese: 愛憎)	November 9, 2023
7	"Human"; Transliteration: "Ningen" (Japanese: 人間)	November 9, 2023
8	"True Intentions"; Transliteration: "Shin'i" (Japanese: 真意)	November 9, 2023
9	"Father"; Transliteration: "Chichioya" (Japanese: 父親)	November 9, 2023
10	"Celebration"; Transliteration: "Iwai Koto" (Japanese: 祝事)	November 9, 2023
11	"Play"; Transliteration: "Yūgi" (Japanese: 遊戯)	November 9, 2023
12	"Sacrifice"; Transliteration: "Gisei" (Japanese: 犠牲)	November 9, 2023

== Video game ==
Cover art

Akuma-kun: Makai no Wana (悪魔くん・魔界の罠) is a role-playing video game for the Famicom that was released on February 24, 1990, and is based on the anime. It was developed by Tose and published by Bandai.

The game follows Shingo Umoregi (Akuma-kun), who the player controls, through three different types of areas. The world map allows Akuma-kun to visit different towns and dungeons. The world map is in an overhead perspective and features random encounters, which pit Akuma-kun against randomly appearing enemies. During battles, the perspective switches to first-person and the player selects different types of attacks from a menu. During battle, the player can summon demons to aid Akuma-kun with fighting. The player's party and the enemies then take turns attacking each other, similar to most other turn-based RPGs. When Akuma-kun enters a town, the view switches to that of a side-scrolling video game. By moving up at certain areas, Akuma-kun can enter buildings and shops.

The game begins as a wizard explains to Akuma-kun that the world will be a better place if demons and humans establish contact. Akuma-kun then sets out to establish this connection.

== See also ==
- List of video games based on anime or manga
