= Fumitoshi Oizaki =

Japanese animator

Fumitoshi Oizaki (追崎 史敏, Oizaki Fumitoshi; born October 15, 1975) is a Japanese animator, character designer, storyboard artist and director. He is primarily associated with Gonzo, which animated his series directorial debut, Romeo × Juliet, and with Sunrise, where he served as series character designer of the Sgt. Frog franchise. He is a member of the Japan Animation Creators Association (JAniCA) labor group.

== Works ==
=== Television series ===
- His and Her Circumstances (1998–1999: episode key animator)
- Now and Then, Here and There (1999–2000: episode key animator)
- Final Fantasy: Unlimited (2001; animation director)
- Prétear (2001: episode director (episode 11))
- Kaleido Star (2003: character design (with Hajime Watanabe), chief animation director, animation director (episodes 1, 26), key animator (episodes 1, 3, 17))
- Sgt. Frog (2004: character design, animation supervision)
- Welcome to the N.H.K. (2004: animation director, storyboard artist (ending credits sequence 1, Pururin opening credits))
- Romeo × Juliet (2007: director)
- Astarotte no Omocha! (2011; director)
- Place to Place (2012: director)
- Etotama (2015: director)
- Aokana: Four Rhythm Across the Blue (2016: director)
- A Centaur's Life (2017: chief director)
- Merc Storia: The Apathetic Boy and the Girl in a Bottle (2018: director, series composition)
- Deaimon (2022: director)
- Chillin' in My 30s After Getting Fired from the Demon King's Army (2023: director)
- Akuma-kun (2023: director)
- The Gorilla God's Go-To Girl (2025: director)
- The Daily Life of a Part-time Torturer (2026: director)

=== Original video animation (OVA) ===
- Gate Keepers 21 (2002–2003: episode director)
- Re: Cutie Honey (2004: key animator (episode 3))
- Kaleido Star: New Wings Extra Stage - The Amazing Princess Without a Smile (2004: character designer, chief animation director)
- Kaleido Star: Legend of Phoenix ~Layla Hamilton Story~ (2005; character designer, chief animation Director)
- Kaleido Star: Kaleido Star: Good dayo! Goood!! (2006: character designer)

=== Original net animation (ONA) ===
- Etotama ~Nyan-Kyaku Banrai~ (2021: director)

=== Theatrical films ===
- Princess Arete (2001: key animator)
- Mind Game (2004: key animator)
- Sgt. Frog the Super Movie (2006: character design, chief animation director)
- Sgt. Frog the Super Movie 2: The Deep Sea Princess (2007: character design, chief animation director)
- Afro Samurai: Resurrection (2009: key animator)
- Shin Gekijōban Keroro Gunsō: Fukkatsu Shite Sokkō Chikyū Metsubō no Kiki de Arimasu! (2026: director)
