= Kayleigh McKee =

American voice actress (born 1994)

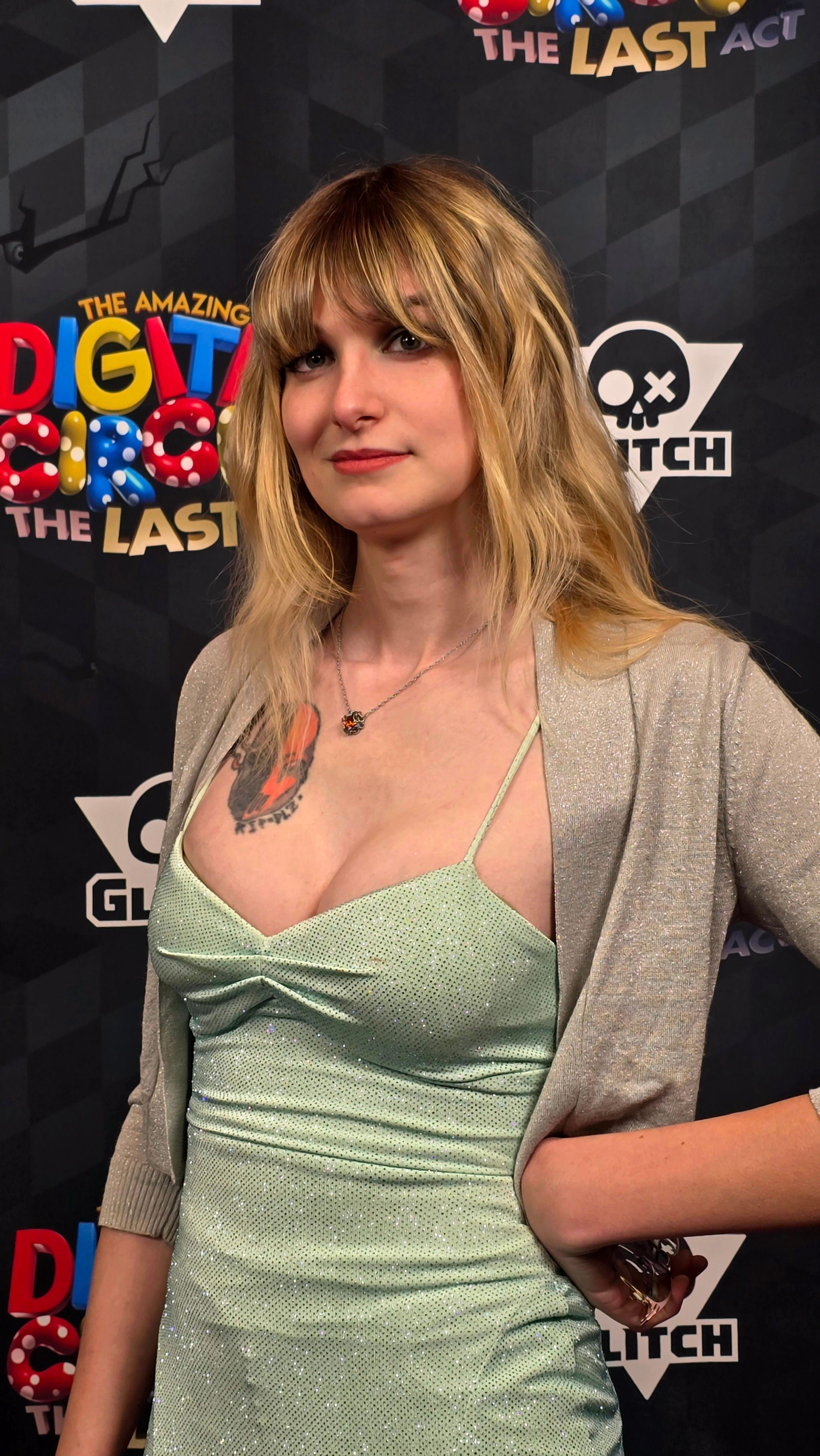
- McKee in 2026
- Born: January 14, 1994 (age 32); Macomb, Illinois, U.S.
- Occupation: Voice actress
- Years active: 2016–present
- Website: kayleigh-mckee.com

Kayleigh Grace Clementine McKee (born January 14, 1994) is an American voice actress, known for providing voices in English dubs of Japanese anime and video games. Some of her noteworthy roles include Matthias Hildesheimer in The Strongest Sage With the Weakest Crest and Yuta Okkotsu in Jujutsu Kaisen 0.

== Early life ==
Kayleigh Grace Clementine McKee was born on January 14, 1994, in Macomb, Illinois. She grew up in Galesburg, Illinois, and graduated from Abingdon High School in nearby Abingdon, Illinois. McKee's father was a fan of anime and tabletop role-playing games like Dungeons & Dragons; he introduced McKee to the medium. At a young age, she was obsessed with animation and participated in theater, choir, and wanted to be a voice actor. She also watched her father's friends draw their comics and she became an artist as a result, later moving to California, working on commercials, and her first video game role was with Hearthstone.

== Career ==
McKee has voiced characters in the English language dub of various anime series and games, including Kiku in One Piece and two characters in the 2020 video game Genshin Impact, Rongshi and Chai Yi. Her role as Kiku was described by Beatrix Kondo of Game Rant as a positive depiction of an LGBTQ character, noted that McKee sharing the news of her casting was "met with earned applause" from One Piece fans, with McKee describing the role as the first time she had voiced a trans female character.

In 2021, McKee provided dubbed voices for various anime characters. Her voice acting for Pina in Beastars was praised by Anime News Network as a "standout" performance, and said to bring a "loveable attitude" to the character's "jaded personality". She also voiced characters including Sei Satomi in Kageki Shojo!!, Bat in The Detective Is Already Dead Varden Dawngrasp in Hearthstone, and two characters (Wolfgang Amadeus Mozart and Randgriz) in Record of Ragnarok. On social media, McKee said that Randgriz's character had importance which could "not be understated" in the series and said people could hear her as many background characters. She also described voicing Testament in Guilty Gear Strive as "so fun" to do and noted that she also voiced their "two little succubi" in the game as well. She later told Game Rant that Varden was one character she identified with the most because she saw the character as a "non-binary Blood Elf" due to her previous experience playing World of Warcraft as a child.

The following year, she provided the dubbed voices for Joan in Requiem of the Rose King, Kuresawa in Sasaki and Miyano, Itaru Saito in The Prince of Tennis II, Kai Harn in Bastard!! Heavy Metal, Dark Fantasy, and Kusunoki in Lycoris Recoil Her voice acting as Kai Harn was praised by Anime News Network columnist Jean-Karlo Lemus as "amazing".

She also voiced three characters (Isamu Tamaru, Takuya's mother, and Mizuki's ex-boyfriend) in Kotaro Lives Alone and two characters in video games: Zepydra in Diablo Immortal and Eel Barnes in Escape Academy. Her voice acting for Isamu Tamaru was praised by Brittany Vincent of Decider as infusing the character with "effervescence and fun" and making the character "extremely memorable" as a result. On social media, McKee described voicing Eel Barnes as "fun" and said she "loved bringing this type of energy to a character."

The same year, McKee dubbed lead characters in two anime productions: The Strongest Sage With the Weakest Crest series (Matthias), and the film Jujutsu Kaisen 0 (Yuta Okkotsu). She was later interviewed by Anime News Network about the film, telling interviewer Jacki Jing that she went through some similar experiences to Yuta and brought that to voicing the character, to determine the voice and the trauma the character had experienced. When interviewed, she told Screen Rant that her favorite part of Yuta's character was that no matter his situation and how he feels about himself, "he wants to help if he can – even when he thinks he can't...[and] he starts to learn that he needs to value himself to value the world and to help it." She also told David Opie of Digital Spy that more anime are coming out with trans and gay characters, saying there is communication with Japanese voices, English dubbing, and that she had written to some studios about their trans characters and "what they should consider, and what they should maybe steer away from." She later said in an interview with Entertainment Weekly's Shania Russell that she was originally unaware of how much Yuta would play in the Jujutsu Kaisen series and noted she had actually auditioned for Yuji after watching season 1.

In 2023, McKee had several voice roles. One was for the dubbed voice for Takaihito in My Happy Marriage and the other was for the lead role in Adventure Time: Fionna and Cake: Scarab, an original character which did not exist in the original Adventure Time series'. She told Game Rant she loved doing the latter role, stating that being part of the Adventure Time universe was a "full-on dream come true" and said she could not even describe what it meant to her. Additional roles she voiced in 2023 included Alpione in Octopath Traveler II and multiple characters in Cassette Beasts, including Dorian and Sunny.

McKee at Animate! Columbus in 2026

The year after, she did the dubbed voices for Yuta Okkotsu in Jujutsu Kaisen Season 2 and Nohmen in Mission: Yozakura Family, and additional voices in the films Digimon Adventure and Digimon Adventure: Our War Game!, and dubbed voices of characters in the 2024 Ranma ½ reboot series. In March of that year, she told Game Rant that she identified with Yuta as a character, noting her similar life experiences, and said that she loved doing the dubbed voice of Charles Augustus Milverton in Moriarty the Patriot because she could use her British accent in a voice role.

In 2025, McKee voiced a character in Tougen Anki. She voices Sparky in Knights of Guinevere, an independent animated series co-created by Dana Terrace, John Bailey Owen, and Zach Marcus, which released its pilot episode on September 19. On social media, McKee noted that she also voices the nurse and Orso, and said the series was "so, so cool to be a part of". Later that same year, McKee collaborated with TeamFourStar, voicing Queen Beryl in Toonami Abridged: Sailor Moon, a comedic retelling of the first season.

In 2026, McKee reprised Yuta Okkotsu in the third season of Jujutsu Kaisen, along with also voicing Kirara Hoshi and Jinichi Zenin, with CBR praising her for a wide vocal range and noting that McKee drops her voice "several octaves" to voice Jinichi and saying that fans could not have asked for anyone better "to translate Yuta and Kirara into English."

== Personal life ==
McKee is a transgender woman. Being inspired by the transgender rock singer Laura Jane Grace, McKee was motivated to pursue a career voice acting in animation. She has been described as using her voice range "as a trans gal to voice women, men, and beyond." McKee later told The Mary Sue, in May 2024, that when she decided to transition, she was not sure she wanted to go into art and entertainment, so she went to school for illustration and acting, afraid if people would respect her, and said that Grace coming out as trans gave her "the courage to pursue what I do today." She also told the publication that sometimes she felt that there was "a drawback" from being openly trans, but other times "people have been very interested in getting representation." Previously she has told an interviewer at Anime Riverside that she did not want to play live-action male roles, but she would "give voice to men, you know, male characters" due to her voice range as a trans woman. She also stated in February 2026 that she portrayed "cis gals, trans girls, transfeminine enbies, genderless beings, monsters, young cis guys, and man's men" because she can perform a wide variety of characters, across genders, and added that she is "100% a woman" who has "more gender than can be quantified."

== Works ==
=== Anime series ===
List of voice performances in anime series
Year	Title	Role	Notes	Source
2019–present	One Piece	Kiku (Funimation Dub)		
2021	Record of Ragnarok	Wolfgang Amadeus Mozart, Randgriz		
2021	Beastars	Pina		
2021	Kageki Shojo!!	Sei Satomi		
2021	The Detective Is Already Dead	Bat		
2021	JoJo's Bizarre Adventure: Stone Ocean	Prison announcement (Episode 5), prisoner in infirmary		
2022	Requiem of the Rose King	Joan		
2022	Sasaki and Miyano	Kuresawa		
2022	The Strongest Sage With the Weakest Crest	Matthias	Lead role	
2022	Kotaro Lives Alone	Isamu Tamaru, Takuya's Mother, Mizuki's Ex-Boyfriend		
2022	The Prince of Tennis II	Itaru Saito		
2022	Bastard!! Heavy Metal, Dark Fantasy	Kai Harn		
2022	Lycoris Recoil	Kusunoki		
2023	My Happy Marriage	Takaihito		
2024–present	Jujutsu Kaisen	Yuta Okkotsu, Kirara Hoshi, Jinichi Zenin		
2024–present	Mission: Yozakura Family	Nohmen		
2025	Tougen Anki	Principal		

=== TV series ===
List of voice performances in television
Year	Title	Role	Notes	Source
2023	Adventure Time: Fionna and Cake	Scarab	Lead role	

=== Web series ===
List of voice performances in online series
Year	Title	Role	Notes	Source
2021–2022	Drawfee Show	Herself	Special guest in two episodes	
2025–present	Knights of Guinevere	Sparky	Lead role	
2025–2026	Toonami Abridged: Sailor Moon	Queen Beryl	Two-Part episode from TeamFourStar	
2025–present	It's Bunlith! The Witch Upstairs	Beatrix/Bunlith	Lead role	
2026	Spooky Month	Aspen Moor	"The Wacky Wicked Woods"	

=== Film ===
List of voice performances in film
Year	Title	Role	Notes	Source
2021	Sword Art Online Progressive: Aria of a Starless Night	Mito (Beta Avatar)		
2022	Jujutsu Kaisen 0	Yuta Okkotsu	Lead role	
2024	Digimon Adventure	Additional Voices		
2024	Digimon Adventure: Our War Game!	Female Employee 2A, Little Boy 2B, Additional Voices		
2026	This Is I	Ai Haruna/Kenji Onishi	English dub	

=== Video games ===
List of voice performances in video games
Year	Title	Role	Notes	Source
2020	Genshin Impact	Rongshi, Chai Yi		
2021	Hearthstone	Varden Dawngrasp		
2021	NEO: The World Ends with You	Eiru, Jo Makita, additional voices		
2021	Guilty Gear Strive	Testament		
2022	Diablo Immortal	Zepydra		
2022	Escape Academy	Eel Barnes		
2023	Octopath Traveler II	Alpione		
2023	Cassette Beasts	Dorian, Sunny, additional voices		
