= Chiharu Sawashiro =

Japanese actor

- 沢城 千春
- Born: December 20, 1987 (age 38); Tokyo, Japan
- Occupation: Voice actor
- Years active: 2013–present
- Agent: Stay Luck
- Notable credits: Love Kome as Nishiki Sasa; Caligula as Ritsu Shikishima; Tribe Nine as Taiga
- Relatives: Miyuki Sawashiro (sister)

Chiharu Sawashiro (Japanese: 沢城千春, Hepburn: Sawashiro Chiharu) (born December 20, 1987) is a Japanese voice actor affiliated with Stay Luck. After working as a stage actor, he used connections from his sister to become a voice actor and made his debut as Masamune Shiga in Tokyo Twilight Ghost Hunters. Since Tokyo Twilight Ghost Hunters, some of his more prominent roles have included Nishiki Sasa in Love Kome, Ritsu Shikishima in Caligula, and Taiga in Tribe Nine.

== Biography ==
Chiharu Sawashiro was born in Tokyo on December 20, 1987. Chiharu is the younger brother of voice actress Miyuki Sawashiro. Miyuki had been voice acting since she was in middle school. At first, Chiharu was a bit skeptical of voice acting, since it was a lot less popular at the time. However, as voice acting got more popular, his peers continued to ask him questions about his sister. Chiharu later became a stage actor during college before he decided to give voice acting a try after voicing additional voices in the Dog & Scissors series with the Dead Stock Unit. Using connections from his sister, he was able to enter vocational school and eventually made his full debut as a voice actor with Masamuse Shiga in Tokyo Twilight Ghost Hunters.

In August 2021, he was diagnosed with COVID-19, but was asymptomatic.

== Filmography ==
=== TV series ===
2016

- Cheer Boys!! as Takeru Andō
- All Out!! as Natsuki Ise
- Show by Rock!! as Argon

2017

- Love Kome as Nishiki Sasa
- Yu-Gi-Oh! VRAINS as Naoki Shima

2018

- Caligula as Ritsu Shikishima
- Mr. Tonegawa as Yūichirō Nagata

2019

- Manaria Friends as Heinlein

2020

- A3! as Banri Settsu

2021

- Sushi Sumo as Yobidashi Gari

2022

- Tribe Nine as Taiga
- The Prince of Tennis II: U-17 World Cup as Elmar Siegfried
- Fuuto PI as Shun Makura

2023

- High Card as Bobby Ball
- The Fruit of Evolution 2 as Demiolos
- Mushoku Tensei: Jobless Reincarnation 2 as Mimir

2024

- Tsukimichi: Moonlit Fantasy 2nd Season as Belda Nortst Limia
- Tower of God 2nd Season as Karaka
- Acro Trip as Tsuki

2025

- Dr. Stone: Science Future as Carlos
- Catch Me at the Ballpark! as Takimoto
- Wind Breaker Season 2 as Takeru Kongo
- Tougen Anki as Shinya Momoiwa

2026

- Hana-Kimi as Kazuma Saga
- The Ghost in the Shell as Police Officers, Scrap Salvagers

=== Films ===
2021

- Mobile Suit Gundam: Hathaway's Flash as Kenji Mitsuda

2024

- Dead Dead Demon's Dededede Destruction as Ojiro-senpai

=== Video games ===
2014

- Tokyo Twilight Ghost Hunters as Masamune Shiga

2016

- The Caligula Effect as the main character
- 7'scarlet as Sosuke Kenpira

2017

- A3! as Banri Settsu

2019

- The King of Fighters for Girls as Joe Higashi

2021

- Neo: The World Ends with You as Fret

=== Dubbing ===
==== Live-action ====
- Doom Patrol (Victor Stone / Cyborg (Joivan Wade))
- Midsommar (Mark (Will Poulter))
- Ride On (Naihua (Guo Qilin))

==== Animation ====
- The Legend of Vox Machina (Scanlan Shorthalt)
