= The Strongest Sage with the Weakest Crest =

Japanese light novel series

- First light novel volume cover

失格紋の最強賢者 〜世界最強の賢者が更に強くなるために転生しました〜 (Shikkakumon no Saikyō Kenja ~Sekai Saikyō no Kenja ga Sara ni Tsuyoku Naru Tame ni Tensei Shimashita~)
- Genre: Adventure, fantasy
- Novel series
- Written by: Shinkoshoto
- Published by: Shōsetsuka ni Narō
- Original run: December 2016 – April 2020
- Light novel
- Written by: Shinkoshoto
- Illustrated by: Huuka Kazabana
- Published by: SB Creative
- Imprint: GA Novel
- Original run: May 14, 2017 – present
- Volumes: 21
- Manga
- Written by: Shinkoshoto
- Illustrated by: LIVER JAM&POPO
- Published by: Square Enix
- English publisher: NA: Square Enix
- Magazine: Manga Up!
- Original run: June 27, 2017 – September 1, 2026
- Volumes: 36
- Light novel

Senmetsu Madō no Saikyō Kenja: Musai no Kenja, Madō wo Kiwame Saikyō e Itaru
- Written by: Shinkoshoto
- Illustrated by: Huuka Kazabana
- Published by: SB Creative
- Imprint: GA Bunko
- Original run: September 11, 2020 – present
- Volumes: 3
- Manga

Senmetsu Madō no Saikyō Kenja: Musai no Kenja, Madō wo Kiwame Saikyō e Itaru
- Written by: Shinkoshoto
- Illustrated by: Yue Ling; Ponjea
- Published by: Square Enix
- Magazine: Manga Up!
- Original run: September 15, 2020 – present
- Volumes: 10
- Anime television series
- Directed by: Noriaki Akitaya
- Produced by: Tadayuki Akita; Tomoko Fujimura; Takumi Itou; Takayuki Matsunaga; Akihiro Narita; Shinya Oota
- Written by: Hiroki Uchida
- Music by: Junpei Fujita; Seima Iwahashi; Ryouta Tomaru
- Studio: J.C.Staff
- Licensed by: Crunchyroll; SA/SEA: Medialink
- Original network: Tokyo MX, BS11, SUN, AT-X
- Original run: January 8, 2022 – March 26, 2022
- Episodes: 12
- icon

The Strongest Sage with the Weakest Crest (失格紋の最強賢者 〜世界最強の賢者が更に強くなるために転生しました〜, Shikkakumon no Saikyō Kenja ~Sekai Saikyō no Kenja ga Sara ni Tsuyoku Naru Tame ni Tensei Shimashita~), also known as Shikkakumon no Saikyō Kenja (失格紋の最強賢者) or simply Shikkakumon (失格紋), is a Japanese light novel series, written by Shinkoshoto and illustrated by Huuka Kazabana. It was serialized online from December 2016 to April 2020 on the user-generated novel publishing website Shōsetsuka ni Narō. It was later acquired by SB Creative, who have published twenty-one volumes since May 2017 under their GA Novel imprint. A manga adaptation with art by LIVER JAM&POPO was serialized online from June 2017 to September 2026 via Square Enix's online manga magazine Manga Up!. It was collected in thirty-six tankōbon volumes. The manga is licensed in North America by Square Enix. An anime television series adaptation by J.C.Staff aired from January to March 2022.

A side story light novel series titled Senmetsu Madō no Saikyō Kenja: Musai no Kenja, Madō wo Kiwame Saikyō e Itaru (殲滅魔導の最強賢者 無才の賢者、魔導を極め最強へ至る; "The Strongest Sage of Annihilation Magic: The Unskilled Sage, Mastering Magic and Becoming the Strongest") has been published by SB Creative since September 2020 under their GA Bunko imprint with two volumes as of March 2024. A manga adaptation of the side story by Yue Ling and Ponjea was also launched at the same time on Manga UP!. It has been collected in ten tankōbon volumes as of December 2025.

== Synopsis ==
In a world of magic, the powers and future of a mage are predetermined at birth through so-called "Crests", four symbols that categorize a human's aptitude for magic. Lamenting the fact that his crest was considered ill-suited for combat and only useful for magic augmentation, an incredibly skilled sage decided to reincarnate thousands of years in the future.

The sage is reborn as Mathias Hildesheimr, a six-year-old boy and the third son of a duke's family. Matthias attains the crest of close combat which he always desired. Unfortunately, it is also discovered that mankind's knowledge of magic and swordsmanship has drastically deteriorated in this era; only shoddy magic equipment can be sporadically found, while even the most basic spells have been forgotten. To add insult to injury, his current crest, once hailed as the most powerful, is now viewed as the worst.

When Mathias becomes 12 years old, his unrivaled swordsmanship lands him in the Second Royal Academy. Shattering prejudices, he promptly makes ripples in the academy and beyond. However, the former sage uncovers signs of dark forces working in the shadows, and with humanity weaker than ever, it is up to Mathias to thwart their evil plans.

== Characters ==
Matthias Hildesheimer (マティアス = ヒルデスハイマー, Matiasu Hirudesuhaimā)
Voiced by: Nina Tamaki (Japanese); Kayleigh McKee (English)
Known as "Gaius" in his previous life around 5000+ years ago, he reincarnated himself as Matthias in order to obtain a new Crest by his Reincarnation magic, which would be better than his "First Crest". He was able to successfully achieve his goal upon reincarnation in the form of "Fourth Crest". His main goal in life is to gain power so that he can challenge and fight against the powerful Monsters in the Outer Space.
Lurie Abendroth (ルリイ = アーベントロート, Rurii Ābentorōto)
Voiced by: Sayumi Suzushiro (Japanese); Amber Connor (English)
A daughter of the Abendroth House. She has a crush on Matthias since the first day they met and bears the "First Crest" just like Matthias's previous reincarnation.
Alma Lepucius (アルマ = レプシウス, Aruma Repushiusu)
Voiced by: Haruka Shiraishi (Japanese); Lizzie Freeman (English)
The third daughter of the Lepucius House. She is a best friend of Lurie and bears the "Second Crest". Although her magic power is lower than Matthias and Lurie, she has been good with her archery skills.
Iris (イリス, Irisu)
Voiced by: Shiori Izawa (Japanese); Brianna Knickerbocker (English)
Also known as the "Black Dragon Iris", she is one of the oldest and strongest Dragons still alive. She is the only one who knows Matthias's true identity after being reunited thousand years later and decided to keep it a secret upon his request. In her human form, she appears as a young girl, and is enrolled in the academy along with the others.

== Media ==
=== Light novels ===
Shinkoshoto began serializing the series on the user-generated novel publishing website Shōsetsuka ni Narō in December 2016. In May 2017, it was acquired by SB Creative, who published the series with illustrations by Huuka Kazabana under their GA Novel imprint.

No.	Japanese release date	Japanese ISBN
1	May 14, 2017	978-4-7973-9236-4
2	August 11, 2017	978-4-7973-9328-6
3	December 15, 2017	978-4-7973-9438-2
4	March 15, 2018	978-4-7973-9588-4
5	June 15, 2018	978-4-7973-9696-6
6	September 15, 2018	978-4-7973-9816-8
7	December 15, 2018	978-4-7973-9990-5
8	March 15, 2019	978-4-7973-9991-2
9	June 15, 2019	978-4-8156-0128-7
10	September 14, 2019	978-4-8156-0130-0
11	January 12, 2020	978-4-8156-0508-7
12	May 15, 2020	978-4-8156-0652-7
13	March 13, 2021	978-4-8156-0970-2
14	January 15, 2022	978-4-8156-1136-1
15	March 15, 2022	978-4-8156-1531-4
16	December 15, 2022	978-4-8156-1911-4
17	May 15, 2023	978-4-8156-2116-2
18	September 15, 2023	978-4-8156-2117-9
19	July 14, 2024	978-4-8156-2589-4
20	December 15, 2024	978-4-8156-2590-0
21	June 15, 2025	978-4-8156-2591-7

=== Manga ===
A manga adaptation of the light novel series by LIVER JAM&POPO began serialization in Square Enix's Manga Up! magazine on June 27, 2017. The manga ended serialization on September 1, 2026. Square Enix Manga & Books licensed the manga for a North American release.

No.	Original release date	Original ISBN	English release date	English ISBN
1	December 13, 2017	978-4-7575-5545-7	July 14, 2020 (digital); August 11, 2020 (physical)	978-1-64609-040-2
2	March 13, 2018	978-4-7575-5662-1	October 13, 2020	978-1-64609-041-9
3	June 13, 2018	978-4-7575-5741-3	January 26, 2021	978-1-64609-045-7
4	September 13, 2018	978-4-7575-5840-3	July 27, 2021	978-1-64609-046-4
5	December 13, 2018	978-4-7575-5939-4	September 28, 2021	978-1-64609-047-1
6	March 13, 2019	978-4-7575-6039-0	November 23, 2021	978-1-64609-048-8
7	June 12, 2019	978-4-7575-6157-1	March 22, 2022	978-1-64609-049-5
8	September 12, 2019	978-4-7575-6294-3	July 26, 2022	978-1-64609-050-1
9	December 12, 2019	978-4-7575-6421-3	November 22, 2022	978-1-64609-095-2
10	March 12, 2020	978-4-7575-6558-6	January 24, 2023	978-1-64609-096-9
11	June 12, 2020	978-4-7575-6687-3	March 28, 2023	978-1-64609-118-8
12	September 12, 2020	978-4-7575-6841-9	May 23, 2023	978-1-64609-127-0
13	December 11, 2020	978-4-7575-6996-6	July 11, 2023	978-1-64609-152-2
14	March 12, 2021	978-4-7575-7146-4	September 12, 2023	978-1-64609-153-9
15	June 11, 2021	978-4-7575-7312-3	November 14, 2023	978-1-64609-170-6
16	September 10, 2021	978-4-7575-7481-6	January 9, 2024	978-1-64609-171-3
17	December 10, 2021	978-4-7575-7634-6	March 12, 2024	978-1-64609-231-4
18	March 11, 2022	978-4-7575-7821-0	May 14, 2024	978-1-64609-232-1
19	June 10, 2022	978-4-7575-7970-5	July 2, 2024	978-1-64609-233-8
20	September 12, 2022	978-4-7575-8146-3	September 10, 2024	978-1-64609-250-5
21	December 12, 2022	978-4-7575-8312-2	November 12, 2024	978-1-64609-255-0
22	March 10, 2023	978-4-7575-8474-7	January 7, 2025	978-1-64609-263-5
23	June 12, 2023	978-4-7575-8617-8	March 11, 2025	978-1-64609-317-5
24	September 12, 2023	978-4-7575-8802-8	May 13, 2025	978-1-64609-318-2
25	December 12, 2023	978-4-7575-8966-7	July 15, 2025	978-1-64609-319-9
26	March 12, 2024	978-4-7575-9110-3	September 2, 2025	978-1-64609-371-7
27	June 12, 2024	978-4-7575-9255-1	November 11, 2025	978-1-64609-394-6
28	September 12, 2024	978-4-7575-9426-5	January 13, 2026	978-1-64609-437-0
29	December 12, 2024	978-4-7575-9576-7	March 10, 2026	978-1-64609-452-3
30	March 12, 2025	978-4-7575-9750-1	May 12, 2026	978-1-64609-493-6
31	June 12, 2025	978-4-7575-9902-4	July 14, 2026	978-1-64609-494-3
32	September 11, 2025	978-4-301-00065-5	September 15, 2026	979-8-89910-038-3
33	December 11, 2025	978-4-301-00230-7	November 10, 2026	979-8-89910-039-0
34	March 12, 2026	978-4-301-00397-7	—	—
35	June 11, 2026	978-4-301-00586-5	—	—
36	September 11, 2026	978-4-301-00769-2	—	—

=== Anime ===
At the "GA Fes 2021" event livestream, it was announced that the series would be receiving an anime television series adaptation produced by NBCUniversal Entertainment Japan and animated by J.C.Staff. The series is directed by Noriaki Akitaya, with Hiroki Uchida overseeing the series' scripts. It aired from January 8 to March 26, 2022, on Tokyo MX, BS11, SUN, and AT-X. The opening theme is "Leap of faith" by fripSide, while the ending theme is "Day of Bright Sunshine" by Yuki Nakashima. Crunchyroll streamed the series in select territories. Medialink licensed the series in South Asia, Southeast Asia, Oceania minus Australia and New Zealand.

On January 13, 2022, Crunchyroll announced that the series will receive an English dub, which premiered on February 19.

No.	Title	Directed by	Written by	Storyboarded by	Original release date
1	"The Strongest Sage Appears."; Transliteration: "Saikyō Kenja, Arawaru." (Japanese: 最強賢者、現る。)	Shūji Miyazaki	Hiroki Uchida	Noriaki Akitaya	January 8, 2022
Genius sorcerer Gaius laments that with the three magical Crests he was born with, Creation, Power, and Rapid Firing, he cannot grow any stronger, so he decides to reincarnate in the future. Reborn 5000 years later as Matthias Hildesheimer, he gains the fourth crest Close Combat which is regarded in this time as the weakest Crest. Deciding to join the Second Royal Academy, Matthias travels to the capital city where he discovers magical knowledge has drastically decreased. He meets fellow academy hopefuls Lurie and Alma and enchants a magical sword for Lurie, who develops a crush on him. After defeating Knight Captain Guile with the sword and showing his advanced combat magic, Matthias is accepted into the academy along with Lurie and Alma. Headmaster Eduard asks him to teach the other students his wordless casting, the ability to cast spells without verbal incantations which is a skill normally rejected in academic circles, in time for the next inter-academy competition. At the competition against the prestigious First Academy, Matthias realizes one of their students, Devilis, is a demon and defeats it after exposing it to the audience. He realises the decline of magical knowledge and wordless casting must have been caused by demons to make humanity weaker after he himself almost drove demons extinct 5000 years ago.
2	"The Strongest Sage Enters the Dungeon."; Transliteration: "Saikyō Kenja, Danjon e." (Japanese: 最強賢者、迷宮(ダンジョン)へ。)	Takuma Suzuki; Kazunori Kunimoto	Hiroki Uchida	Masayuki Takahashi	January 15, 2022
The king personally thanks Matthias for defeating a demon, even though to Matthias it was barely a challenge. For his reward, Matthias requests access to the kingdom's dungeons and the resources within. The king reveals the most powerful sorcerers of the kingdom vanished after the demons' defeat, causing Matthias to realize they must have been demons who infiltrated human society to destabilize it. Now unable to keep hiding, Matthias reasons they will assemble armies to attack the kingdom. He thus gains the king's permission to continue teaching wordless casting while gathering materials necessary to cast a magical barrier of protection over the city. To gather resources Matthias decides to raid a dungeon with Lurie and Alma to increase their combat power, teaching Alma to use a bow and Lurie how to craft and enchant weapons and armor. After reaching floor 10 and increasing their levels, Matthias descends to a much deeper floor alone to gather adamantite for the barrier. While there he also defeats a boss monster, which brings his magical power to the attention of several demons. Matthias learns from Lurie and Alma that his former identity as Gaius is worshipped as a God of Magic.
3	"The Strongest Sage Meets a Dragon."; Transliteration: "Saikyō Kenja, Irisu to Deau." (Japanese: 最強賢者、竜(イリス)と出会う。)	Kai Hasako	Hiroki Uchida	Kai Hasako	January 22, 2022
After selling the boss monster's magi-stone, which Matthias considers too small for the barrier but everyone else considers big enough to be a national treasure, he splits the money equally with Lurie and Alma. Two demons appear in the city to avenge the death of Devilis. Lurie and Alma distract the weaker demon, allowing Matthias to defeat the stronger demon by himself. The king once again rewards them, Matthias with the location of every known dungeon in the kingdom and Lurie and Alma with a cash reward. Matthias realizes a demon is watching the throne room with a surveillance spell and manages to injure the demon on the other side. The king recognizes the demons voice as Erhard, his former Mage Captain. With Erhard's location discovered Matthias decides to find him, but as it would take a year to travel the distance Matthias takes Lurie and Alma into the mountains and introduces them to Iris the Darkness Dragon who, despite being unimaginably scary to the girls, was one of Gaius' defeated enemies. She revealed years previously an accidental magic explosion returned human society to the dark ages, explaining the current lack of magical knowledge and technology, as well as damaging her wings which Matthias then repairs. With Iris carrying them they travel the distance to Erhard in only one day.
4	"The Strongest Sage Infiltrates."; Transliteration: "Saikyō Kenja, Sennyū Suru." (Japanese: 最強賢者、潜入する。)	Makoto Sokuza	Yūji Ōnishi	Kōichi Takada	January 29, 2022
After breaking into Erhard's home Matthias exposes him from behind his spell of invisibility. Refusing to believe Matthias is the one who injured him due to how long it should have taken to travel from the capital to his hidden location, Erhard attacks but is quickly weakened by the magi-toxin on Alma's arrows, severely affecting his magic and making defeating him easy. Matthias also exposes a stronger mist demon hiding in the forest and after a short fight curses the demon with a spell to overload his magic, causing him to explode from the force of his own magic. The explosion uncovers a buried Dragon Vein Pillar, a giant crystal that can tap into the world's natural magic power. The demons had planned to summon an army of monsters just outside the capital. Returning to the academy Matthias offer to vouch for Iris to attend the academy in human form. Due to her unfamiliarity with human behavior, Iris laughably fails the written exam but is accepted after using unusual methods to defeat Guile in a sword duel and her magic almost destroying the academy arena which Matthias promises to repair.
5	"The Strongest Sage Makes Allies."; Transliteration: "Saikyō Kenja, Nakama o Eru." (Japanese: 最強賢者、仲間を得る。)	Shin'ichi Fukumoto	Yūji Kobayashi	Toshinori Fukushima	February 5, 2022
Preparation of the barrier goes slowly with only Second Academy students. The King requests First Academy to offer assistance, but headmaster Facus refuses to associate with their inferiors at Second Academy. Matthias suggests holding a second inter-academy competition and Facus agrees, provided Matthias does not compete. Facus brings 50 First Academy students to compete against 5 Second Academy students but they easily win using wordless casting. The king, who had been observing, sees that Facus had been forcing his students to ignore his order to switch to wordless casting and has Facus arrested. Facus' students, who did not like him much, happily cooperate with Second Academy and learn wordless casting. Still requiring a much larger magi-stone for the barrier, Matthias takes the girls back into the dungeon, much deeper this time, and harnessing Iris' magic summon a dragon. After a long fight and using all their new skills the dragon is defeated and yields a magi-stone of sufficient size for the barrier. Matthias also decides Iris has improved enough to become an official team member. Iris trains to be a better fighter with her human body while Matthias and Lurie use the resources harvested from the dragon to make swords for themselves, a new bow for Alma and a spear for Iris capable of withstanding her power.
6	"The Strongest Sage Leaves the School."; Transliteration: "Saikyō Kenja, Gakuen o Deru." (Japanese: 最強賢者、学園を出る。)	Toshinori Fukushima; Makoto Sokuza	Hiroki Uchida	Masayuki Takahashi	February 12, 2022
As Matthias begins constructing the barrier the demons attack, forcing Matthias to put Lurie and Alma in charge of defending the city while he and Iris begin distributing adamantine to complete the barrier. The students hold back the demons while Lurie crafts an arrow for Alma capable of defeating the first demon to attack. Following his death more demons arrive but Matthias, having finished the barrier in time, defeats them then activates the barrier, preventing demons from being able to enter the city ever again. Unfortunately, while the demons are defeated their army of monsters, summoned using another Dragon Vein Pillar, is still outside the city. The students defeat the first wave of monsters using wordless casting, then retreat so Matthias and his team can take the more powerful monsters. The most powerful, a Void Eater that consumes other monsters to grow, is manipulated by Matthias feeding it certain spells so that it will provide more useful resources once defeated. With the Void Eater defeated Matthias decides he has to leave the academy to find the Dragon Vein Pillars. Eduard lets him leave but keeps him listed as a Scholarship student in case Matthias adventures get him in political trouble the academy can then protect him from. Alma, Lurie and Iris also become scholarship students so they can go with him on his quest.
7	"The Strongest Sage Goes on a Journey."; Transliteration: "Saikyō Kenja, Tabiji o Iku." (Japanese: 最強賢者、旅路を往く。)	Makoto Sokuza	Yūji Ōnishi	Kōichi Takada	February 19, 2022
Matthias decides to explore Melkia dungeon but learns since he reincarnated an adventurer city has been built over it. Alma and Lurie try to avoid passing through a forest on the journey but accidentally make Matthias curious when they mention an intelligent monster that lives there. As usual, Matthias easily defeats the monster. Reaching Melkia the group learn the Melkian lord has been making the city unsafe and controls the adventurer guild, meaning adventurers have to do whatever job he gives them. Most of the adventurers come back from a monster hunt severely injured requiring Matthias to heal them. Matthias learns the previous lord passed away suspiciously, causing him to suspect the new lord is a demon making adventuring as dangerous as possible to kill off strong adventurers. He sends a secret letter to Eduard to pass to the king then plans to spend the next day hunting the monster that injured the adventurers; however, due to the awkwardness of all sharing a room together Matthias and Lurie do not sleep at all. Regardless they defeat the monster easily, drawing the attention of the lord who appears to have spies in the guild and even adventurers working directly for him who begin following them.
8	"The Strongest Sage Saves the City."; Transliteration: "Saikyō Kenja, Machi o Sukuu." (Japanese: 最強賢者、街を救う。)	Naoki Murata	Yūji Kobayashi	Iku Suzuki	February 26, 2022
Matthias easily leads the adventurers into a trap where Iris knocks them out. In response to his letter the King sends his royal proxy, Eik, to order Matthias to take Lord Dokiel into custody. Defeating Dokiel's guards Matthias arrests him and Eik takes him to face the King. Too late, Matthias realizes the demon controlling of Melkia have found the dungeon's Dragon Vein Pillar and summoned a monster horde outside the city. Entering the dungeon Matthias leaves Lurie to cancel the spell placed on the Pillar by the demons, with Iris and Alma guarding her, while he locates the demon in charge. Eavesdropping on the demons' telepathic conversation Matthias determines there is an even higher ranked demon somewhere else advising the demon on how to beat Matthias. It is also revealed the master knows about the sorcerer Gaius, meaning he is very old, smart and powerful but is unsure if Matthias is Gaius' reincarnation or not. Even with his master's help, the demon is overwhelmed by Matthias and beheaded. Lurie restores the Pillar, causing the summoned monsters to vanish. Via the remaining telepathic link, Matthias and the master demon casually threaten each other and decide to meet in the future. Matthias becomes excited at the thought of an actual challenge.
9	"The Strongest Sage Duels."; Transliteration: "Saikyō Kenja, Kettō Suru." (Japanese: 最強賢者、決闘する。)	Kai Hasako	Yūji Kobayashi	Kai Hasako	March 5, 2022
Matthias had captured the demons magical signature in a magistone but requires a device he created thousands of years ago as Gaius to track him. The device is currently across the border in the Radinia Alliance, a group of allied kingdoms, and to cross the border he needs permission from the King. Returning home they find the academy demolished to make way for a new upgraded academy. With permission to cross the border Matthias learns his device is in Folkia Region, an area of such strong magic it is forbidden except for A rank adventurers so Matthias agrees to take the A rank promotion exam. The adventurer, Giluas, is ranked S, higher than A, and is obsessed with fighting. He nonchalantly promotes Iris, Lurie and Alma but insists on fighting Matthias who has become famous as a demon slayer. Giluas proves to be the strongest opponent Matthias has faced, even able to copy Matthias combat moves, yet Matthias is still victorious. After advising Giluas how to get even stronger with spells Giluas is grateful yet irritated at having to read books to learn. He advises them Folkia is dangerous and adventurers frequently vanish. Straight away in Folkia border guards try to secretly place demon tracking spells on them. Bandits attack but are swiftly put to sleep. Unfortunately Lurie and Alma also accidentally fall asleep.
10	"The Strongest Sage Works With a Team."; Transliteration: "Saikyō Kenja, Renkei Suru." (Japanese: 最強賢者、連携する。)	Shin'ichi Fukumoto	Yūji Ōnishi	Kōichi Takada	March 12, 2022
The group continues to Folkia and they immediately sense 32 disguised Devils, a type of demon that is weak at magic and prefer to fight in large groups. Rather than sneak past the town guards Matthias uncovers a concealed tunnel. Emerging into Folkia they see that citizens have all been hypnotized to keep them mindless while they work in a large factory. Protecting themselves from the spell they infiltrate the factory and find they are refining Lankin Demon Ore. One ton of refined ore can make a bomb powerful enough to destroy an entire country, though it is so rare collecting one ton takes decades. Facing Devils is dangerous as they can use Sense Share, so once one Devil is aware of them, all 32 of them will know as well. Using superior strategy, the group begin killing the devils one by one until only 10 remain. The remaining 10 decide to use small pieces of ore to blow up the city, only for Giluas to suddenly appear. With only the Devils leader remaining Giluas duels him alone and Matthias is pleased to see Giluas has already improved his spell casting. After a difficult fight the Devil is defeated but not yet dead.
11	"The Strongest Sage Faces a Powerful Enemy."; Transliteration: "Saikyō Kenja, Kyōteki to Aitai Suru." (Japanese: 最強賢者、強敵と相対する。)	Makoto Sokuza	Hiroki Uchida	Masayuki Takahashi; Toshinori Fukushima	March 19, 2022
The Devil passes on a message he will soon be resurrected, then disintegrates. Matthias realizes the master demon responsible for Melkia was controlling the devil via necromancy to pass on the message. Giluas names the factory's foreman the new Lord of Folkia. Continuing on their journey they reach the ruins hiding the device and Matthias is forced to conceal the fact it was he who built the ruins. Using his device Matthias confirms the master demon's name is Zardias and he was sealed long ago because he was too powerful to be killed. Matthias is certain he is too weak to defeat Zardias, and even if he was strong enough their battle would likely destroy the world and push humanity to extinction. Desperate, Matthias uses the device to search for a sword he forged long ago and finds it is somewhere back home in the king's treasury. Zardias finally resurrects and flies to the kingdom to stop Matthias finding the sword. Alma and Lurie search the treasury while Iris is almost killed instantly. Matthias is able to keep up with Zardias but is also injured and fears that defeating Zardias and saving humanity might just cost his life.
12	"The Strongest Sage Goes on a Journey Again."; Transliteration: "Saikyō Kenja, Futatabi Tabidatsu." (Japanese: 最強賢者、再び旅立つ。)	Noriaki Akitaya; Makoto Sokuza	Hiroki Uchida	Noriaki Akitaya	March 26, 2022
Zardias reveals that all the demons Matthias has defeated have been resurrected inside the barrier to kill Lurie and Alma. Lurie and Alma are saved by Eduard and the academy students and throw the sword to Matthias but Zardias stabs him. Matthias comes back to life, revealing the sword was the most powerful he ever created; if the wielder dies their life force is used to resurrect them. Zardias is defeated but before dying warns Matthias another demon will just replace him. The king once again gives them access to the treasury as a reward. Matthias discovers an adamantine arrow he crafted in his previous life but the matching bow is missing. He tracks the bow to the Isis Company who, not knowing the value of adamantine melted it down so Matthias buys all their scrap metal as well as some magic stones for the girls. Guile informs Matthias of an incident where their neighboring Syhill Empire was attacked by an army of artificial doll soldiers. Due to the complex magic Matthias deduces a demon is responsible and may be in control of Syhill. Later, Lurie suspects Matthias might kiss her but really he just made her a necklace from one of the jewels. Having fully recovered everyone decides to set off to Syhill for their next adventure.

=== Mobile game ===
In December 2021, it was announced that a mobile game based on the series, titled Shikkaku Mon no Saikyō Kenja: The Ultimate Reincarnation, will be released on iOS and Android in 2022.

== Reception ==
Rebecca Silverman from Anime News Network gave the first volume of the manga adaptation a C+. She praised the artwork, the hints the story gives about events that happened prior to the start of the story, and that the characters age properly, while criticizing it for being too generic and the pacing feeling rushed and uneven. The following volume earned a B−, with Rebecca Silverman praising the improvements made to the story and pacing, as well as the consistently good art, while criticizing it for still feeling a bit generic, one character getting less development, and some odd translation decisions.

== See also ==
- My Isekai Life—Another light novel series by the same author and illustrator.
- The World's Strongest Rearguard—Another light novel series by the same illustrator.
