= Caligula (TV series) =

Japanese anime television series

- Promotional art

カリギュラ (Karigyura)
- Created by: Aquria; Takuya Yamanaka
- Anime television series
- Directed by: Jun'ichi Wada
- Produced by: FuRyu
- Written by: Touko Machida
- Music by: Tsukasa Masuko; Yasuharu Takanashi; Funta7; RegaSound; Kenji Iwata
- Studio: Satelight
- Licensed by: Crunchyroll; NA: Discotek Media
- Original network: Tokyo MX, ytv, BS Fuji, AT-X
- Original run: April 8, 2018 – June 24, 2018
- Episodes: 12

Caligula (Japanese: カリギュラ, Hepburn: Karigyura) is a Japanese anime television series adaptation of the video game The Caligula Effect. It is produced by studio Satelight, and aired from April 8 to June 24, 2018.

== Plot ==
The narrative centers on Ritsu Shikishima, a high school student who begins to perceive irregularities in his seemingly perfect world, such as hearing a mysterious voice through his phone and noticing inconsistencies in his environment. These anomalies lead him to the revelation that his reality is, in fact, a virtual construct known as Mobius. This artificial realm was created by the sentient virtual idol μ (Mu) with the intention of rescuing humanity from suffering by confining individuals within a fabricated utopia. Determined to return to the real world, Ritsu joins forces with eight other students to form the "Go-Home Club." Together, they confront various challenges and adversaries, including the "Ostinato Musicians," devotees of μ who strive to maintain the illusion of Mobius. As the group delves deeper into the mysteries of their false reality, they confront their own personal traumas and the reasons that led them to seek refuge in Mobius, all while striving to find a way back to their true lives.

== Characters ==
The voice actors for the cast differ slightly from the game.

Ritsu Shikishima (式島 律, Shikishima Ritsu)
Voiced by: Chiharu Sawashiro
The protagonist. In the video game, the protagonist does not have a name and can be either male or female.
μ (ミュウ, Myū)
Voiced by: Reina Ueda
Izuru Minezawa (峯沢 維弦, Minezawa Izuru)
Voiced by: Yūichirō Umehara, Tomoaki Maeno (Note: Until episode 8; Yūichirō Umehara got ill and is recovering and replaced by Tomoaki Maeno.)
Shougo Satake (佐竹 笙悟, Satake Shōgo)
Voiced by: Shunsuke Takeuchi
Aria (アリア)
Voiced by: Asami Shimoda
Ike-P (イケP)
Voiced by: Soma Saito
Kagi-P (カギP)
Voiced by: Shouta Aoi
Suzuna Kagura (神楽 鈴奈, Kagura Suzuna)
Voiced by: Minami Tanaka
Kotono Kashiwaba (柏葉 琴乃, Kashiwaba Kotono)
Voiced by: Rie Murakawa
Mirei (ミレイ)
Voiced by: Eriko Nakamura
Marie Mizuguchi (水口 茉莉絵, Mizuguchi Marie)
Voiced by: Mai Fuchigami
Naruko Morita (守田 鳴子, Morita Naruko)
Voiced by: Ari Ozawa
Shadow Knife (シャドウナイフ, Shadou Naifu)
Voiced by: Yuma Uchida
Mifue Shinohara (篠原 美笛, Shinohara Mifue)
Voiced by: Rie Takahashi
Shounen Doll (少年ドール, Shōnen Dōru)
Voiced by: Yumiri Hanamori
Thorn (ソーン, Sōn)
Voiced by: Yuka Ōtsubo
Sweet-P (スイートP, Suīto-P)
Voiced by: Emi Nitta
Kotarou Tomoe (巴 鼓太郎, Tomoe Kotarō)
Voiced by: Yoshimasa Hosoya

== Anime ==
FuRyu announced during a livestream presentation that The Caligula Effect was to be adapted into a television anime. It premiered in April 2018. The anime is directed by Junichi Wada at Satelight, with Touko Machida handled the series composition, Kenji Tanabe designed the characters based on Oguchi's original design, and Yasuharu Takanashi alongside Funta7, Tsukasa Masuko, Kenji Iwata, and RegaSound composed the music. The opening theme song is "Paradigm Box" by Chiharu Sawashiro and Shunsuke Takeuchi, while the ending theme song is "Hypno" by Minami Tanaka, Rie Murakawa, Ari Ozawa, and Rie Takahashi. The series ran for 12 episodes. Crunchyroll streamed the series. The series has been licensed for a North American physical release by Discotek Media.

No.	English title Original Japanese title (Note: All English titles are taken from Crunchyroll.)	Original release date
1	"When You Lose Your Composure, You Cannot Reach the Truth or Reality"; Transliteration: "Reiseisa o Miushinau to, Shinjitsu to Shinri ni Tadoritsuku koto wa Dekinai." (Japanese: 冷静さを見失うと, 真実と真理にたどり着くことはできない。)	April 8, 2018
2	"Anxiety, Irritation, and Other Such Negative Emotions Spread to Others"; Transliteration: "Fuan, Shōsō nado to itta Fu no Kanjō wa Tanin o Makikondeiku." (Japanese: 不安, 焦燥などといった負の感情は他人を巻き込んでいく。)	April 15, 2018
3	"Why Do We Live? The Further We Pursue the Meaning of Life, the More Confused We Become"; Transliteration: "Naze, Ikite iru no ka? Jinsei ni tsuite Tsukitsumeteikeba iku hodo, Konran shite shimau." (Japanese: 何故、生きているのか？人生について突き詰めて行けば行くほど、混乱してしまう。)	April 22, 2018
4	"People Who do Not Respect Themselves Will Not be Respected By Others!"; Transliteration: "Jibun no Sonzai o Mitomenai Ningen wa, Tanin kara mo Sonkei sarenai." (Japanese: 自分の存在を認めない人間は、他人からも尊敬されない。)	April 29, 2018
5	"Everyone Gets Hurt, But Those Who Don't Realize They're Hurting Can't be Healed"; Transliteration: "Dare de mo Kizutsuku koto wa aru. Da ga, Kizutsuiteiru koto ni Kizukanai mono wa Iyasarenai." (Japanese: 誰でも傷つくことはある。だが、傷ついていることに気付かない者は癒やされない。)	May 6, 2018
6	"Looking Forward Doesn't Equal Progress On its Own. Understanding One's Situation is Also an Important Step"; Transliteration: "Maemuki na dake ga Zenshin to wa ienai. Jōkyō o shiru koto mo Taisetsu na Ippo da." (Japanese: 前向きなだけが前進とは言えない。状況を知ることも大切な一歩だ。)	May 13, 2018
7	"When You're in a Desperate Situation, It's All the More Important to Keep Smiling"; Transliteration: "Zetsubō-teki na Jōkyō de aru Toki koso, Egao o Tataeru koto ga Hitsuyō da." (Japanese: 絶望的な状況である時こそ、笑顔をたたえることが必要だ。)	May 20, 2018
8	"Your Life Shouldn't be Built from Someone Else's Blueprint. No Matter How Unskilled You May Be You Should Draw It Yourself"; Transliteration: "Jinsei to wa, Tanin no Sekkeizu de Tsukuru mono de wa nai. Donna ni Chisetsu de mo Jibun de Egakubekida." (Japanese: 人生とは、他人の設計図で作るものではない。どんなに稚拙でも自分で描くべきだ。)	May 27, 2018
9	"Even If Something has Already Happened, You Can Still Choose What You Do"; Transliteration: "Nanika ga Okotte shimatta ato de atte mo, Nani o Suru ka wa Jibun de Sentaku dekiru." (Japanese: 何かが起こってしまった後であっても、何をするかは自分で選択できる。)	June 3, 2018
10	"Caligula"	June 10, 2018
11	"People Constantly Seek Out the Right Answer, Yet is Being Right Really All that Matters?"; Transliteration: "Hito wa Tsune ni Seikai o Motomeru. Da ga, Tadashikereba Hontō ni Sore de ī no ka?" (Japanese: 人は常に正解を求める。だが、正しければ本当にそれでいいのか?)	June 17, 2018
12	"Destroy Your Ideals and Self, and Return to Hell and Reality"; Transliteration: "Kimi (Risō) o Kowashite, Jigoku (Genjitsu) e Kaeru――." (Japanese: 理想(きみ)を壊して、現実(じごく)へ帰る――。)	June 24, 2018
