= Nina Tamaki =

Japanese voice actress

- 玉城 仁菜
- Born: 29 February 1996 (age 30)
- Occupation: Voice actress
- Years active: 2017–present
- Employer: Just Pro
- Notable work: Love Kome as Maru Niko; Blue Reflection Ray as Nina Yamada; The Strongest Sage with the Weakest Crest as Matthias Hildesheimer

Nina Tamaki (玉城 仁菜, Tamaki Nina; born 29 February 1996) is a Japanese voice actress from Okinawa Prefecture, affiliated with Just Pro. She is known for voicing Maru Niko in Love Kome, Nina Yamada in Blue Reflection Ray, and Matthias Hildesheimer in The Strongest Sage with the Weakest Crest.

== Biography ==
Nina Tamaki, a native of Okinawa Prefecture, was born on 29 February 1996. Tamaki was educated at Voice Lab Tokyo, allowing her to experience a wide range of auditions.

In January 2017, Tamaki was cast as Maru Niko in Love Kome. In January 2021, she was cast as Matthias Hildesheimer, the main character of The Strongest Sage with the Weakest Crest. In March 2021, she was cast as Nina Yamada in Blue Reflection Ray.

Tamaki recorded a song titled "Nijiyome-chan Hamigami Keikaku" (にじよめちゃん歯みがき計画; lit. 'Nijiyome-chan's Toothbrushing Plan'), and on 15 August 2018, it was released on an independently-published single of the same name, alongside a karaoke version.

Among Tamaki's hobbies are shamisen and the Korean language.

== Filmography ==
=== Animated television ===
2017

- Love Kome, Maru Niko

2018

- Cardfight!! Vanguard, young Aichi Sendou
- Dropkick on My Devil!, Bunsendō clerk

2021

- Blue Reflection Ray, Nina Yamada
- PuraOre! Pride of Orange, Mami Ono's mother

2022

- The Strongest Sage with the Weakest Crest, Matthias Hildesheimer

2025

- Backstabbed in a Backwater Dungeon, Light

=== Video games ===
2017

- Himitsu no Yadoya, Aruno

2018

- Kotodaman, Kōjoyū Chōmiderella, Fumō Zubo Rapunzel

2019

- Eshi-shin no kizuna, Harima
- Senshū Densetsu Senkyō: Kamigami ga Sumu Risōkyō, Bakuya

2021

- Final Gear, Afura
