= Backstabbed in a Backwater Dungeon =

Japanese light novel series

- Backstabbed in a Backwater Dungeon: My Trusted Companions Tried to Kill Me, but Thanks to the Gift of an Unlimited Gacha I Got LVL 9999 Friends and Am Out for Revenge on My Former Party Members and the World
- Cover art of the first light novel

信じていた仲間達にダンジョン奥地で殺されかけたがギフト『無限ガチャ』でレベル9999の仲間達を手に入れて元パーティーメンバーと世界に復讐&『ざまぁ！ 』します！ (Shinjite Ita Nakama-tachi ni Danjon Okuchi de Korosarekaketa ga Gifuto "Mugen Gacha" de Reberu Kyūsenkyūhyakukyūjūkyū no Nakama-tachi o Te ni Irete Moto Pātī Menbā to Sekai ni Fukushū ando "Zamā!" Shimasu!)
- Genre: Fantasy, harem
- Novel series
- Written by: Shisui Meikyō
- Published by: Shōsetsuka ni Narō
- Original run: April 17, 2020 – present
- Light novel
- Written by: Shisui Meikyō
- Illustrated by: tef
- Published by: Hobby Japan
- English publisher: NA: J-Novel Club
- Imprint: HJ Novels
- Original run: May 19, 2021 – present
- Volumes: 15
- Manga
- Written by: Shisui Meikyō
- Illustrated by: Takafumi Ōmae
- Published by: Kodansha
- English publisher: NA: Seven Seas Entertainment
- Imprint: KC Deluxe
- Magazine: Magazine Pocket
- Original run: May 25, 2021 – present
- Volumes: 24
- Anime television series

My Gift Lvl 9999 Unlimited Gacha: Backstabbed in a Backwater Dungeon, I'm Out for Revenge!
- Directed by: Katsushi Sakurabi
- Written by: Hiroshi Ōnogi
- Music by: Ryo Takahashi
- Studio: J.C.Staff
- Licensed by: Sentai Filmworks: SA/SEA: Muse Communication
- Original network: Tokyo MX, MBS, CBC, BS11, AT-X
- Original run: October 3, 2025 – December 19, 2025
- Episodes: 12
- icon

Backstabbed in a Backwater Dungeon: My Trusted Companions Tried to Kill Me, but Thanks to the Gift of an Unlimited Gacha I Got LVL 9999 Friends and Am Out for Revenge on My Former Party Members and the World (Note: Japanese: 信じていた仲間達にダンジョン奥地で殺されかけたがギフト『無限ガチャ』でレベル9999の仲間達を手に入れて元パーティーメンバーと世界に復讐&『ざまぁ！ 』します！, Hepburn: Shinjite Ita Nakama-tachi ni Danjon Okuchi de Korosarekaketa ga Gifuto "Mugen Gacha" de Reberu Kyūsenkyūhyakukyūjūkyū no Nakama-tachi o Te ni Irete Moto Pātī Menbā to Sekai ni Fukushū ando "Zamā!" Shimasu!) is a Japanese light novel series written by Shisui Meikyō and illustrated by tef. The series started serialization on the online platform Shōsetsuka ni Narō in April 2020, and was later acquired by Hobby Japan for a print release in May 2021, with a manga adaptation by Takafumi Ōmae being published by Kodansha since May 2021. Both series were licensed for an English-language release, with J-Novel Club publishing the light novel series and Seven Seas Entertainment publishing the manga series. An anime television series adaptation produced by J.C.Staff aired from October to December 2025.

The series follows Light, a human adventurer who was member of the adventurers group Concord of the Tribes in order to fight discrimination against human race. One day, Light was betrayed by his fellow group members left to die in a dungeon called the Abyss. Infuriated by this act, Light swore to take revenge against them for betraying and leaving him behind.

== Premise ==
The world is inhabited by nine tribes: dragonutes, demons, oni, dwarves, elves and dark elves, beast men, centaurs, and humans, with the last ones being the weakest of all. Despite this, there are humans who receive a special power, known as a "gift", once they reach the age of 10.

Light is a human adventurer bestowed with the gift of "unlimited gacha", allowing him to summon an endless number of cards to support his comrades. He is a member of the Concord of the Tribes, an adventurer group consisting of the dragonute Drago, the elf Sasha, the dark elf Sionne, beast man Garou, the dwarf Naano, the centaur Santor, the ghoul Oboro, and Diablo from the demon race. The group was seemingly formed to fight against the discrimination against humanity.

One day, when Light had to be saved in the world's most dangerous dungeon, known as the "Abyss", the members revealed to Light that he was no longer a member of the adventurers group and the sole purpose of the group was to observe him for being a potential "master" candidate. It is said that the master is a being with the power of overruling the world and destroying civilization. As Light only was able to summon useless cards they decided to classify him not as a threat, to get rid of him and disguise his death as a monster attack. Before Garou was able to deliver the final blow Light managed to activate a teleportation trap by accident, which transported him to the deepest part of the dungeon. As his wounds attracted the attention of numerous monsters he used his gift out of desperation in the hope of summoning something to distract the monsters. He summons the seeker maid Mei, a SUR card, who is able to defeat the monsters with only one blow. Mei reveals to Light that he was able to summon her due to the density of magic in this place and that his summons until now were useless because of the lack of magic on the surface. He responds to her question about how he was able to reach the deepest part of the dungeon to summon her, retelling his story of how he was betrayed and nearly killed by his former comrades. Hearing this, Mei offered to support him in his plans to take revenge on those who betrayed him.

For the next three years, Light spends his time and power building an underground base in the Abyss, and decides to return to the surface of the world to start his revenge against his former comrades. When he visits his hometown he learns that it was completely destroyed and its people were massacred, including his parents. He witnessed other races enslaving humans, using them in horrendous experiments or killing them just for fun. So, Light decides to enlarge his revenge to all the other races to free all the humans from enslavement and discrimination as well as to search for his siblings, who have seemingly survived the attack on his former hometown.

== Characters ==
=== Main characters ===
Light (ライト, Raito)
Voiced by: Nina Tamaki (Japanese); Shannon Emerick (English)
A 12-year-old human boy with gift of "unlimited gacha" which allows him to summon endless amounts of cards for support. He was a member of an adventurer group called the Concord of the Tribes.
One day while investigating the world's most dangerous dungeon called the "Abyss" he was kicked out of the group and revealed that his comrades were observing him and his gift for being a potential "master" candidate by the order of their kingdoms.
His hometown was destroyed while Light was absent. His siblings seemed to have survived the attack, so Light has multiple goals to achieve: Searching for his lost siblings, revenge against his former comrades and finding the truth behind the reason for his attempted murder.

=== Summoned card characters ===
==== SUR cards Lvl. 9999 ====
Light's Royal Quartet who share the rank of his right hand and are the vice-founders of his kingdom.

Mei (メイ)
Voiced by: Ikumi Hasegawa (Japanese); Molly Searcy (English)
SUR card "Lvl 9999 Seeker Maid" (レベル9999 探求者メイド). She is the first SUR card Light has summoned, and the very first summon of them all. She has long, black hair which is tied into a ponytail. Mei is Light's maid and has sworn her loyalty to him.
In the beginning, Mei had trained Light so he was able to raise his own Lvl to 9999 even though it is thought that the level cap for humans was about 100.
Aoyuki (アオユキ)
Voiced by: Shiori Izawa (Japanese); Annie Wild (English)
SUR card "Level 9999 Genius Beast Tamer" (レベル9999 天才モンスターテイマー). Aoyuki is the second SUR card summoned by Light. She has a childlike figure and blue hair. Aoyuki wears a hoodie with cat ears. She loves acting like a cat, being treated as a cat, and speaks in either meows or cat puns. As her name suggests, Aoyuki is capable of controlling monsters regardless of their levels and quantity.
Ellie (エリー, Erī)
Voiced by: Ayumi Mano (Japanese); Ginger Sue (English)
SUR card "Lvl. 9999 Forbidden Witch" (レベル9999 禁忌の魔女エリー). A beautiful woman with long, blonde hair wearing a witch hat. Ellie is the third SUR card which was summoned by Light's gift.
As her title suggests, as a forbidden witch Ellie has mastered magic, wizardry, the dark arts and ghost magic. Ellie is capable of creating new spells and to suppress the magic of her opponents. Under an alias she lives part time in "the Giant Tower" pretending to be the leader of her faction for discretion from Light's enemies that are on hold!
Nazuna (ナズナ)
Voiced by: Hana Hishikawa (Japanese); Chaney Moore (English)
SUR card "Lvl. 9999 True Vampire Knight" (レベル9999 真祖ヴァンパイア騎士(ナイト)). Nazuna is a beautiful young girl with fire-red eyes and long, silver-colored hair. She wears heavy armor and is rumoured to be the strongest warrior in the world. In battle she mostly uses a broadsword which is taller than Nazuna herself.
Nazuna is the fourth and last SUR card summoned by Light which is why she is treated like a daughter by the others. Her unique figure is that she is a half vampire with the strength of pureblood, however she does not nor need to drink the blood of others. She is very immature and light-hearted and can be easily startled when those above her, like Ellie, scold her. Currently when she is not sent on a mission on the surface, she is assigned to be Yume's bodyguard.

=== UR cards ===
==== Lvl. 7777 ====
Suzu (スズ)
Voiced by: Reina Kondō, Kōichi Sōma (Lock)
UR card "Lvl. 7777 All-Rounded Gunner" (レベル7777 両性具有ダブルガンナー). A young girl with violet-colored eyes and hair. She is a gunner carrying a talking musket called "Lock" with her.
As Suzu is a timid and silent person, Lock is the one communicating with others on her behalf. In the English dub, Lock speaks with an American Southern accent. However, when provoked, namely by someone insulting Light, she becomes incredibly bloodthirsty and unreasonable.
Mera (メラ)
Voiced by: Riho Sugiyama
UR card "Lvl. 7777 the Chimera" (レベル7777 キメラ). A tall woman with red-colored eyes and jagged teeth. She is a chimera whose body consists of countless other creatures. Mera can cut off parts of her body and put them back together.
Iceheat (アイスヒート, Aisuhīto)
Voiced by: Hisako Kanemoto
UR card "Lvl. 7777 the Frozen Firestorm Grappler" (レベル7777 炎熱氷結のグラップラー). A young woman with two-colored hair (red and light blue) which are tied to twintails. As her name suggests, she has high affinity using fire and ice magic. She is capable of summoning mythical beasts like Ifrit.
She is trained by Mei to be a maid which is why she sometimes wears a maid dress.
Jack (ジャック, Jakku)
Voiced by: Katsuyuki Konishi (Japanese); Michael Wronski (English)
UR card "Lvl. 7777 Iron-Blooded Barricade" (レベル7777 鋼鉄のボディ). A muscular young man with green eyes, brown-blonde hair and beard roots. Proud of his strength he fights his opponents with his fists instead of using a weapon. He can envelop his body in a suit of material which is stronger than steel.
Jack sees Light as his younger brother and vows to protect him, and in this Light allows jack to address him to him without formals and among the URs is Lights lone left hand man!

==== Lvl. 5000 ====
Gold (ゴールド, Gōrudo)
Voiced by: Katsuya Miyamoto (Japanese); John Gremillion (English)
UR card "Lvl. 5000 the Orich Knight" (レベル5000 黄金の騎士). A warrior wearing a golden armor. Together with Light, who disguised his identity using the pseudonym "Dark" and the assassin Nemumu, Gold forms the adventurer party called the "Masked Clown".
Gold is loyal towards Light and shares his knowledge as a warrior with other adventurers. He and Nemumu tease each other on a regular basis. Giving the impression that Gold and Nemumu can't stand each other, despite this Gold cares for his companions. Gold speaks with a British accent.
Nemumu (ネムム)
Voiced by: Yūko Natsuyoshi (Japanese); Mai Le (English)
UR card "Lvl. 5000 Assassin Blade" (レベル5000 アサシンブレイド). A young woman with short, white hair. As an assassin, Nemumu is capable in sneaking up towards her opponents without being noticed. She has high affinity in using knives and creating the strongest poisons. She can inculcate her surroundings by using a scream in ultrasound range.
Together with Light and Gold she is part of "The Masked Clown" adventurer group which was formed to investigate the surface of the world and the other races in search for clues about the "master". Like Gold, Nemumu is loyal towards Light which she shows by kissing his feet even to his embarrassment. She is often teased by Gold for her figure.
Aneria and Arus (アネリアとアルス)
UR card Lvl. 5000 the Card Guardians"

==== Lvl. 8888 ====
Chaos (カオス)
"Child of Disorder" Chaos is a prideful warrior with the appearance of a young boy who only recognizes and respects those stronger than him. He refuses to follow Light's orders at first but submits after being defeated in combat by him. Since then he acts as one of Light's commanders and occasionally, as his body double because they have a similar height and physical appearance.
Orca (シャチ)
Formally "the Illusionist" retitled "the Phantom Musician" Orca is a bard who dislikes violence and fights by playing his violin, which is capable to power up allies and weaken opponents.

=== Concord of the Tribes ===
Drago (ドラゴ, Dorago)
Voiced by: Daisuke Ono (Japanese); Rob Mungle (English)
A warrior from the race of dragonutes. His level is 512. Drago is the leader of the adventurer group Concord of the Tribes which Light was part of. Even when he looks like a prudent and friendly person, Drago was the one who ordered the others to kill Light and disguise the murder as a monster attack. Light chose to save Drago for his final target of the Concord of tribes.
Sasha (サーシャ, Sāsha)
Voiced by: Ai Kayano (Japanese); Brianna Roberts (English)
An archer from the elven tribe. Her level is 308. She was born as a result of an affair between a nobleman and a commoner which is why she was disowned by her family.
She seemingly had feelings for Light which turned out to be a lie which is why the other members of the Concord of the Tribes mocked her.
After seemingly killing Light and her engagement with a high-ranked elf her reputation within her race and family increased. When she learned that Light was still alive she tried to kill him in order to keep her reputation. Instead she was captured by Light, after she failed to kill him. Although she was Light's second target, she was his personal favorite target and the one he wanted revenge on the most, because he had a crush on the kind person that she was pretending to be, making his first love a false reality, thus robbing something precious from his childhood.
Garou (ガルー, Garū)
Voiced by: Masaya Fukunishi (Japanese); Joe Daniels (English)
A warrior from the beast men tribe, Garou is a wolf man who fights his opponents with his claws. His level is at 151. Garou was ordered by Drago to deal the final blow on Light. Before Garou was able to kill the young boy, Light escaped activating a teleportation trap by accident.
After Light was declared dead, Garou became popular among the beast man tribe. In reality, Garou is a coward and would betray his own friends in order to survive. As his tribe is one of the weakest (second only to humans), he has no information regarding the mission of the Concord of the Tribes or about the master. Garou was the first target that Light defeated and captured.
Sionne (シオン, Shion)
Voiced by: Yurika Kubo (Japanese); Elissa Cuellar (English)
A young woman and researcher from the dark elf tribe at level 304. Sionne is considered a prodigy and was able to graduate at a renowned university where people from all races can study without facing discrimination.
She became a professor at the university and was fired after it was discovered that she used humans for her research about the "gift". Due to the loss of her professorship and her source of income, she decided to work as an adventurer and was soon scouted to become a member of the Concord of the Tribes.
To her, her research has the highest priority which is why she shows no emotions, neither towards humans nor to her own tribe. She is willing to sacrifice each and everyone as long as she can accomplish her goals in her research.
Sionne made a pact with a soul dragon, a monster from another world aspiring to reach her goal. Her character was added in the manga.
Sionne was the third target that Light defeated and captured.
Naano (ナーノ, Nāno)
Voiced by: Atsushi Ono (Japanese); Luis Galindo (English)
A smith from the dwarven tribe whose goal is to create a godlike weapon. His level is 301. Due to his fame he was chosen by the dwarven king to join the Concord of the Tribes to observe Light and his gift.
After the mission was accomplished, Nano became addicted to alcohol because he failed to reach his own goal and was denied a second chance to look for the "master" which he blamed Light for.
Naano tests his forged weapons on humans. One day he received an instruction Manual for smithing a holy weapon by a mysterious merchant.
Naano was the fourth target that Light defeated and captured.
Santor (サントル, Santoru)
Voiced by: Jiro Saito (Japanese); Kyle Colby Jones (English)
A warrior from the centaur tribe whose level is at 152. His character was added in the manga.
Santor it's the seventh target that Light want to defeat and capture.
Oboro (オボロ)
Voiced by: Yōhei Azakami (Japanese); Ty Mahany (English)
A oni warrior at level 419. He is the second strongest member of the Concord of the Tribes right after Drago.
Oboro was the fifth target that Light defeated and captured.
Diablo (ディアブロ, Diaburo)
Voiced by: Yusuke Shirai (Japanese); Jay Hickman (English)
A fighter from the demon race who is at level 403. His character was added in the manga.
Diablo was the sixth target that Light defeated and captured.

=== C's Group ===
C is a mysterious being that made themselves known while Light was dealing with Naano. Not much is known about C, except they know about Light's quest for vengeance, and has an incarnated form of giant devouring dragon's head, due to an ancient religious painting. Later on it is revealed that the dragon like creature was a servant of C, while C's form was a young woman riding the creature. It's implied by Kaava that the other masters are either searching for or working against C.

Kaava
Known as the Level 5000 Flesh Zombie, Kaava is a human with the ability to boost his abilities by eating human flesh. It was revealed later on that he was actually created by a master known as Hisomi merging various humans together.

== Media ==
=== Light novels ===
Written by Shisui Meikyō, the series began as a web novel with its chapters first published on Shōsetsuka ni Narō on April 17, 2020. Japanese publisher Hobby Japan acquired the rights for a print release of the series and started publishing the novel under their HJ Novels imprint. The light novel, written by Meikyō and illustrated by tef, was published in physical format with the first volume released on May 19, 2021. As of July 2026, fifteen volumes have been published.

In July 2022, American publisher J-Novel Club announced to have licensed the novel series for an English-language release.

No.	Original release date	Original ISBN	English release date	English ISBN
1	May 19, 2021	978-4-7986-2499-0	October 20, 2022	978-1-7183-5448-7
2	September 18, 2021	978-4-7986-2587-4	February 16, 2023	978-1-7183-5450-0
3	January 19, 2022	978-4-7986-2715-1	May 4, 2023	978-1-7183-5452-4
4	May 19, 2022	978-4-7986-2840-0	August 4, 2023	978-1-7183-5454-8
5	September 20, 2022	978-4-7986-2931-5	November 9, 2023	978-1-7183-5456-2
6	January 19, 2023	978-4-7986-3053-3	February 19, 2024	978-1-7183-5458-6
7	May 19, 2023	978-4-7986-3188-2	May 13, 2024	978-1-7183-5460-9
8	October 19, 2023	978-4-7986-3314-5	September 26, 2024	978-1-7183-5462-3
9	March 19, 2024	978-4-7986-3466-1	December 19, 2024	978-1-7183-5464-7
10	July 19, 2024	978-4-7986-3589-7	March 27, 2025	978-1-7183-5466-1
11	November 19, 2024	978-4-7986-3679-5	October 10, 2025	978-1-7183-5468-5
12	April 18, 2025	978-4-7986-3815-7	June 12, 2026	978-1-7183-5470-8
13	October 18, 2025	978-4-7986-3985-7	September 15, 2026	978-1-7183-5472-2
14	February 19, 2026	978-4-7986-4089-1	December 1, 2026	978-1-7183-5474-6
15	July 17, 2026	978-4-7986-4223-9	—	—

=== Manga ===
Takafumi Ōmae started a manga adaptation of the series on Kodansha's Magazine Pocket website on May 25, 2021. The first volume of the manga was released in print on August 6, 2021, in tankōbon format. As of November 2026, twenty-four volumes have been released.

In May 2022, Seven Seas Entertainment announced to have licensed the manga for an English-language translation.

No.	Original release date	Original ISBN	English release date	English ISBN
1	August 6, 2021	978-4-06-521299-8	December 27, 2022	978-1-63858-954-9
1. "Unlimited Gacha"; 2. "Dawn of Revenge"; 3. "Garou's Ace in the Hole"; 4. "A Transcendent Level"; 5. "The Journey Begins"
2	November 9, 2021	978-4-06-522356-7	April 18, 2023	978-1-63858-991-4
6. "Operation Adventurer"; 7. "Cutting in Line"; 8. "Into the Dungeon"; 9. "Invasion"; 10. "Amazement"; 11. "The Comforts of Company"; 12. "Treasure"; 13. "Test Subject"; 14. "Prayer"
3	February 9, 2022	978-4-06-523160-9	August 1, 2023	978-1-63858-893-1
15. "True Colors"; 16. "Triumph"; 17. "What Makes a Hero"; 18. "Verdict"; 19. "Descendant"; 20. "Impossibility"; 21. "Just a Loser"; 22. "Thank You"
4	May 9, 2022	978-4-06-524476-0	December 5, 2023	978-1-63858-959-4
23. "Taking Action"; 24. "Obsession"; 25. "White Knights"; 26. "Under the Surface"; 27. "Second Coming"; 28. "The Chase"; 29. "Perfection"; 30. "The Party Begins"
5	August 9, 2022	978-4-06-525988-7	April 16, 2024	979-8-88843-334-8
31. "Interception"; 32. "Dejection"; 33. "Scorching Heat"; 34. "Checkmate"; 35. "Riddled with Bullets"; 36. "Salvation"; 37. "The Ironblooded Barricade"
6	November 9, 2022	978-4-06-529712-4	August 27, 2024	979-8-88843-846-6
38. "The Best!"; 39. "Uwaaaah!"; 40. "Long Time No See"; 41. "Shall I Begin?"; 42. "Despair"; 43. "EX"; 44. "Ah Ha Ha!"; 45. "Shutout"
7	February 9, 2023	978-4-06-530526-3	December 17, 2024	979-8-89160-035-5
46. "Goodbye"; 47. "Horde"; 48. "Surrender"; 49. "Sionne"; 50. "Blade of the Isles"; 51. "Disembarking"; 52. "Contact"; 53. "Presence"
8	May 9, 2023	978-4-06-531556-9	April 15, 2025	979-8-89160-547-3
54. "The Card Repository"; 55. "Ghost"; 56. "Brute"; 57. "Fainting in Agony"; 58. "Different Class"; 59. "Ineffective"; 60. "A Dream?"; 61. "I'm Sorry"
9	August 8, 2023	978-4-06-532601-5	August 12, 2025	979-8-89373-345-7
62. "Thirst for Research"; 63. "Struggle to Understand"; 64. "Unlimited Supply"; 65. "99,999,999 Cards"; 66. "Purification"; 67. "Together Forever"; 68. "Love You"; 69. "Hell's Gate"
10	November 9, 2023	978-4-06-533510-9	December 23, 2025	979-8-89373-397-6
70. "Report"; 71. "The Abyss"; 72. "Leveling Up"; 73. "Orochi"; 74. "Stratagem"; 75. "Building Battle Strength"; 76. "Level 9999"; 77. "Nightmare"
11	February 8, 2024	978-4-06-534547-4	April 21, 2026	979-8-89373-600-7
78. "The Human Kingdom"; 79. "Visiting the Great Tower"; 80. "Shadow Double"; 81. "Ruler of the Abyss"; 82. "Last Resort"; 83. "Top-Secret Meeting"; 84. "Meeting"; 85. "Please Prepare Yourselves"
12	May 9, 2024	978-4-06-535540-4	August 18, 2026	979-8-89561-350-4
86. "Naano"; 87. "Please, Lemme Lick It!"; 88. "Ruins of the Past Civilization"; 89. "...Ah!"; 90. "Please Leave it to Us"; 91. "Stone Golems"; 92. "Ultimate Sticky Web"
13	August 7, 2024	978-4-06-536515-1	December 1, 2026	979-8-89561-351-1
93. "Ocean View"; 94. "Giant Blue Whale"; 95. "I'm Terribly Sorry"; 96. ""Flesh""; 97. "A Bad Vibe"; 98. "Greatsword Prometheus"; 99. "The Strongest in the Abyss"; 100. "Heave Ho!"
14	November 8, 2024	978-4-06-537423-8	—	—
101. "WHOOOOSH!"; 102. "Complete Cooperation"; 103. "Still Not Enough"; 104. "N-No Way!"; 105. "Trash"; 106. "Flesh Zombie"; 107. "Whaaat?!"
15	February 7, 2025	978-4-06-538410-7	—	—
108. "True Despair and Fear"; 109. "World Eater"; 110. "It Tickles"; 111. "I'll Make Your Dream Come True"; 112. "The Avatar Project"; 113. "An Undisclosed Location"; 114. "Humans or Beasts"; 115. "Orders from the Dragonute Empire"
16	May 9, 2025	978-4-06-539456-4	—	—
116. "Mythical Weapon"; 117. "Another Beautiful Day"; 118. "Escort Request"; 119. "Violet Fallen Angel"; 120. "Friends"; 121. "No Escape"; 121. "I Won't Give Up"; 123. "Beastfoooolk!"
17	August 7, 2025	978-4-06-540358-7	—	—
124. "I'm the Only One..."; 125. "Powerful New Military Strength"; 126. "Bout"; 127. "I Win"; 128. "A Pleasant Timbre"; 129. "Survival of the Fittest"; 130. "We're Best Friends, Right?"; 131. "No Right to Live"
18	October 9, 2025	978-4-06-541099-8	—	—
132. "That Voice"; 133. "Annihilation Time"; 134. "Saint Miya"; 135. "Unseemly"; 136. "Yuck Yuck"; 137. "Accept the Consequences"; 138. "Twinblood Magatama"; 139. "Won't Let You"
19	November 7, 2025	978-4-06-541543-6	—	—
140. "The Path You Chose"; 141. "A Cut Above"; 142. "Surely You Didn't Think Think You Could Deceive Me?"; 143. "Great Towerism"; 144. "I'm Gonna Do My Best!"; 145. "Proving Innocence"; 146. "Aftermath of War"; 147. "It's Blasphemous!"
20	December 9, 2025	978-4-06-541897-0	—	—
148. "People Worth Watching"; 149. "The Tower City Rules"; 150. "Got Me Wet"; 151. "A Real Cutie"; 152. "It's My Lucky Day!"; 153. "A Lovely Little Boy"; 154. "Evacuation Drill"; 155. "Mask"
21	February 9, 2026	978-4-06-542620-3	—	—
156. "The Absolute Worst!"; 157. "You're Gonna Gimme EXP!"; 158. "Something I'm Real Good At"; 159. "The Very Deepest Depths"; 160. "Here I Come"; 161. "The Strongest Mythic-class Weapon"; 162. "True Sight"; 163. "Sole Supremacy"
22	May 8, 2026	978-4-06-543607-3	—	—
164. "Unlimited"; 165. "Dammiiiiiit!"; 166. "An Even Greater Power"; 167. "Fifty Percent Power"; 168. "Curse"; 169. "Gimme!♡"; 170. "Two Types of Masters"
23	August 7, 2026	978-4-06-544615-7	—	—
24	November 9, 2026	978-4-06-545698-9	—	—

==== Chapters not yet in tankōbon format ====
These chapters have yet to be published in a tankōbon volume.

- 171. "It is Unbearable!"
- 172. "Important Quest"
- 173. "Holy Princess Yotsuha"
- 174. "You'll Get Eaten"
- 175. "Bright Future"
- 176. "Thinking Out Loud"
- 177. "Reveal the Location!"
- 178. "Onifolk Martial Arts"
- 179. "Full of Holes"
- 180. "As Her Big Sis"
- 181. "Light of Hope"
- 182. "Welcome"
- 183. "What Happens to Me"
- 184. "Ultimate Strength"
- 185. "The Hidden Truth"
- 186. "An Avenging Oni"
- 187. "A Letter from the Holy Princess"
- 188. "Divine Punishment"
- 189. "Pride in Being Strong"
- 190. "Revival"
- 191. "The Ultimate Revenge"
- 192. "Duplication"
- 193. "Unlimited Forms"
- 194. "You Monsters!"
- 195. "Welcome Back"
- 196. "Oboro's Treatment"
- 197. "Fragment of the Undergod"
- 198. "Cosplay Fashion Show"
- 199. "A Favor"

=== Anime ===
An anime adaptation was announced on November 15, 2024, which was later revealed to be a television series that is produced by J.C.Staff and directed by Katsushi Sakurabi, with series composition and scripts written by Hiroshi Ōnogi, characters designed by Yukie Suzuki, and music composed by Ryo Takahashi. The series aired from October 3 to December 19, 2025, on Tokyo MX and other networks. The opening theme song is "Hira-yori Raiya, Sara-riya Takaki" (閃より雷や、更りや高き), performed by Tei, while the ending theme song is "Shirogarasu" (シロガラス), performed by Nowlu. Sentai Filmworks licensed the series in North America, Australia and British Isles for streaming on Hidive under the title My Gift Lvl 9999 Unlimited Gacha: Backstabbed in a Backwater Dungeon, I'm Out for Revenge!. Muse Communication licensed the series in South and Southeast Asia.

==== Episodes ====
No.	Title	Directed by (Note: Production staff information is taken from the ending credits of each episode.)	Storyboarded by	Original release date
1	"Betrayal and Salvation"; Transliteration: "Uragiri to Sukui" (Japanese: 裏切りと救い)	Katsushi Sakurabi	Katsushi Sakurabi	October 3, 2025
Light is a young human boy who has the gift of "Unlimited Gacha", which dispenses an unlimited number of cards that summon various things. Unfortunately, it only ever gives him useless junk. He is invited to join the Concord of the Tribes, an adventuring party consisting of members of every race who claim they plan to oppose anti-human discrimination. They take him to the Abyss, the most dangerous dungeon in the world, where they promptly kick him out of the party, telling him they were just assigned to find out if Light was a "Master" candidate, and now that they've determined that he isn't, they're going to kill him. Garou, the party's Beastman representative, attacks and brutally injures Light. Light accidentally activates a teleportation trap that teleports him to the deepest floor of the Abyss, while the Concord decides to leave him for dead. A huge monster attacks Light, and with no other choice, he activates the Unlimited Gacha, which summons a powerful warrior maid named Mei, who quickly kills the monster and pledges her servitude to Light. Mei explains that the Unlimited Gacha can pull cards of varying rarities depending on the mana density of the place he uses it in. On the surface, where the mana is thin, the Unlimited Gacha can only pull common, weak cards, but down in the Abyss, where the mana is much denser, it pulls rare, much stronger cards like hers. Light tells her how he wound up in the Abyss, and vows to take vengeance against the Concord, with Mei pledging her loyalty to him. He activates the Unlimited Gacha many more times....
2	"The Abyss"; Transliteration: "Naraku" (Japanese: 奈落)	Yoshihiro Mori	Katsushi Sakurabi	October 10, 2025
Three years later, Light has transformed the deepest floor of the Abyss into his own personal empire populated by Unlimited Gacha summoned characters. He decides it's time to begin his campaign of revenge.
3	"The Lord of Destruction"; Transliteration: "Hametsu no Ō" (Japanese: 破滅の王)	Yoshiyuki Nogami	Katsushi Sakurabi	October 17, 2025
Mei finds Garou and lures him back into the Abyss along with a group of Beast men. They are confronted by Light, who demonstrates his new power. Garou is horrified to learn that Light is now level 9999. Mei brutally kills all of Garou's Beastmen companions. Light activates the very same teleportation trap that allowed him to escape that day, which takes them to the center of Light's empire. Light shows Garou his army of summoned characters, who are all much higher leveled than Garou. Garou realizes to his sheer terror that Light is well prepared to wage war on the entire world.
4	"Adventurers"; Transliteration: "Bōkensha" (Japanese: 冒険者)	Momo Shimizu	Katsushi Sakurabi	October 24, 2025
Light discovers to his horror that his home town was destroyed while he was in the Abyss. He holds out hope that his siblings are still alive, as their bodies have not been found. Taking on the alias "Dark", he and his two level 5000 summons, a knight named Gold and a thief named Nemumu, register as an adventuring party in order to gather intel on other nations. They have a run in with a rage-filled Elven prince named Kaito and his assistant, a Dark Elf named Yanaaq. They also meet a team of young, friendly human adventurers.
5	"A Small Wish"; Transliteration: "Chīsana Negai" (Japanese: 小さな願い)	Yoshiyuki Nogami	Katsushi Sakurabi	October 31, 2025
Dark, Gold, and Nemumu defeat a Quadscythe Mantis and build a reputation as adventurers. Meanwhile, Kaito and Yanaaq start hunting humans, as Yanaaq wants to perform experiments on them, though Kaito keeps killing them over Yanaaq's complaints.
6	"The Adventurer Killer"; Transliteration: "Bōkensha Koroshi" (Japanese: 冒険者殺し)	Yoshihiro Mori	Katsushi Sakurabi	November 7, 2025
Kaito attacks the young human adventurer team, killing most of them. One of them, a girl named Miya, barely escapes and reaches Dark. Dark, Gold, and Nemumu confront Kaito and Yanaaq directly before the two can kill Miya’s brother, another member of the team. As they battle, Kaito claims to be a "Sub-Master", a descendant of a Master.
7	"Thank You"; Transliteration: "Arigatō" (Japanese: ありがとう)	Musashi Sakai	Katsushi Sakurabi	November 14, 2025
Dark, Gold, and Nemumu's fight with Kaito and Yanaaq continues, the latter revealing the two other members of the Elves’ party to be two of his monstrous experiments, but Dark’s party defeats them all and teleports the Elves back to the Abyss for brutal interrogation. After Miya and her brother are fully healed, thank Dark and his team for everything and depart, he returns to the Abyss for the interrogation results, which direct his next move to be to capture the Elven white knights, with their vice captain also revealed to be engaged to Sasha, the Concord of the Tribes’ Elven representative.
8	"The White Knights"; Transliteration: "Shiro no Kishidan" (Japanese: 白の騎士団)	Momo Shimizu	Katsushi Sakurabi	November 21, 2025
Ellie creates a large tower near the Elven Queendom. Dark sends Sasha a challenge note telling her to meet him there. Ellie and Aoyuki have a discussion at the tower where it briefly looks like they're about to come to blows. Some of Dark's summons rescue a human slave girl from the elves. Sasha finds Dark and confronts him.
9	"Kick Off"; Transliteration: "Kaien" (Japanese: 開宴)	Shigeru Ueda	Katsushi Sakurabi	November 28, 2025
Dark uses an illusion of a burn scar over his face to hide his identity from Sasha. At the tower, Dark and the summons prepare for a showdown with Sasha. Sasha and the White Knights approach the tower.
10	"The Tower War"; Transliteration: "Kyotō no Tatakai" (Japanese: 巨塔の戦い)	Keisuke Nishijima	Kenichirou Aoki	December 5, 2025
Dark's summons battle the White Knights.
11	"God Requiem Gungnir"; Transliteration: "Shinsou Gunguniiru" (Japanese: 神葬グングニール)	Yoshiyuki Nogami	Yoshiyuki Nogami	December 12, 2025
Nazuna battles the captain of the White Knights. Sasha and her fiancé, Mikhael, confront Dark. As they fight, Dark unleashes a superweapon, God Requiem Gungnir.
12	"Towards a New Path"; Transliteration: "Aratanaru Michi e" (Japanese: 新たなる道へ)	Katsushi Sakurabi	Katsushi Sakurabi	December 19, 2025
With the power of God Requiem Gungnir, Dark utterly defeats Mikhael and Sasha. Mikhael betrays Sasha and the Elven Queendom in an attempt to save his own skin, but Dark lets Ellie deal with him and captures Sasha. Afterwards, he passes out from Gungnir's power. Ellie attacks the Elven Queendom with an army of dragons and orders them to free all their human slaves. The newly freed humans build a village near the tower. After recovering, Light decides to use his newfound powers to protect all humans from discrimination and build a better world.
