= Love Kome =

Japanese anime television series

- Love Kome: We Love Rice
- Anime key visual

ラブ米 -WE LOVE RICE- (Rabu Kome: We Love Rice)
- Genre: Comedy
- Created by: Yuki Takabayashi
- Manga

Love Kome: Rice is Beautiful
- Published by: Comic Smart
- Magazine: Ganma!
- Original run: February 24, 2017 – July 28, 2017
- Anime television series
- Directed by: Yuta Yamazaki
- Produced by: Yoshitada Fukuhara
- Written by: Takashi Ifukube
- Music by: Plus Tsubasa
- Studio: Encourage Films
- Licensed by: Crunchyroll
- Original network: Tokyo MX, SUN, GYT, RNC
- Original run: April 5, 2017 – December 23, 2017
- Episodes: 24
- Manga

Comic Love Kome: The Rice Plant or the Seed
- Illustrated by: Levin Aoi
- Published by: Ichijinsha
- Magazine: Monthly Comic Zero Sum
- Original run: December 7, 2018 – August 16, 2019

Love Kome: We Love Rice (Japanese: ラブ米 -WE LOVE RICE-, Hepburn: Rabu Kome: We Love Rice) is a Japanese anime television series animated by Encourage Films. The series premiered its first season on April 5, 2017, with the second season started airing on October 5, 2017.

== Plot ==
Five rice-inspired students learn at the Kokuritsu Inaho Academy, a school on the verge of shutting down, and they form a new group called "Love Rice". The five handsome boys work hard in an attempt to supplant bread as the popular grain at the school, but their efforts are challenged by the new students form the "Love Rice" unit. They have to perform at the "Harvest Show", showing how delicious rice grains are.

== Voice cast ==
=== Main characters ===
Hikari Hino (ひのひかり)
Voiced by: Mark Ishii
Nishiki Sasa (ささにしき)
Voiced by: Chiharu Sawashiro
Bore Hitome (ひとめぼれ)
Voiced by: Sousuke Souma
Komachi Akita (あきたこまち)
Voiced by: Misae Komori
Maru Niko (にこまる)
Voiced by: Nina Tamaki

=== Supporting characters ===
Ann (アン / ショート)
Voiced by: Junya Enoki
Shock (ショック / ロール)
Voiced by: Yuuto Suzuki
Carry (キャリー / ガトー)
Voiced by: Genki Okawa
Shou (ショウ / こだわり熟成しょうゆこってりラーメン大盛り焦がし葱バター極太メンマ半熟煮卵金華豚の厚切りチャーシュー)
Voiced by: Showtaro Morikubo
Oidemai (おいでまい)
Voiced by: Tetsuya Kakihara

=== Other characters ===
Chinko Bōzu (Priest Chinko) (ちんこ坊主 (CB))
Voiced by: Tomokazu Sugita
Mori no Kuma-san (Forest Bear) (もりのくまさん)
Voiced by: Mafia Kajita
Mana-musume (まなむすめ)
Voiced by: Natsuko Hara
Koshihikari (こしひかり)
Voiced by: Kenjiro Tsuda
Kurowa (クロワ)
Voiced by: Shuta Morishima
Koro-ane (コロ姐)
Voiced by: Miho Masaka
Camembert (カマンベール)
Voiced by: Hipoo
Gurumi (グル美)
Voiced by: Saori Murakita
Guruko (グル子)
Voiced by: Kaori Saitō
Gurue (グル江)
Voiced by: Rico Sasaki

== Media ==
=== Manga ===
A manga adaptation titled Love Kome: Rice is Beautiful launched on Comic Smart's free manga website Ganma!. A second manga by the series' character designer, Levin Aoi, titled Comic Love Kome: The Rice Plant or the Seed began running in Ichijinsha's Monthly Comic Zero Sum.

=== Anime ===
The anime was announced at Tochigi TV's anime song event "Tochi Ani! Special Stage" on November 26, 2016, anthropomorphizing rice into schoolboys. The series was directed by Takashi Horiuchi, and produced by Yoshitada Fukuhara. Takashi Ifukube wrote the scripts and Yuta Yamazaki served as series director respectively. Manga artist Levin Aoi designed the characters, with Tomoyo Sawada adapting the designs for the anime. Plus Tsubasa composed the music, Kogane Fusa was the sound director, and Toru Nakano was the sound producer. The series was planned by Yaoyorozu, with Encourage Films animating the series. Crunchyroll had the license to stream the series worldwide outside of Asia. The series began airing on April 5, 2017, on Tokyo MX and ran for 12 episodes.

A second season was announced during a live stream event on June 30, 2017. It featured a returning staff. Encourage Films, which produced the first season, remained as the production studio, with all voice cast members reprising their roles from the anime. Crunchyroll still streamed the season worldwide outside of Asia.

==== Season 1 (2017) ====
No. overall	No. in season	Title (Note: All English titles are taken from Crunchyroll.)	Original release date
1	1	"The Newest Crop of Students Is Here?"; Transliteration: "Shin Kome Seito wa Tsubuzoroi?" (Japanese: 新米生徒は粒ぞろい？)	April 5, 2017
2	2	"Nikomaru Can't Keep Smiling"; Transliteration: "Nikoniko Egao Jai Rarenai" (Japanese: ニコニコ笑顔じゃいられない)	April 12, 2017
3	3	"I've Had Enough of the Usual Rice Planting"; Transliteration: "Futsū no Taue wa Mō Akita" (Japanese: 普通の田植えはもうあきた)	April 19, 2017
4	4	"Love at First Sight with Hitomebore"; Transliteration: "Sonna Omae ni Hitomebore" (Japanese: そんなお前にひとめぼれ)	April 26, 2017
5	5	"Sasanishiki is Going Home a Hero"; Transliteration: "Kokyō ni Shiki o Kazaru Noda" (Japanese: 故郷に錦を飾るのだ)	May 3, 2017
6	6	"Go, Yeast King"; Transliteration: "Sore Yuke Īsuto Kingu" (Japanese: それゆけイーストキング)	May 10, 2017
7	7	"The Sextuplets"; Transliteration: "Mutsugo-san" (Japanese: 六つ子さん)	May 17, 2017
8	8	"Say Mine! Koshihikari Shines"; Transliteration: "Koshi ga Hikatte Say Mine!" (Japanese: 腰が光ってSay Mine!)	May 24, 2017
9	9	"Some Breads Are Just Indigestible"; Transliteration: "Pan wa Pan demo Kurenai Pan" (Japanese: パンはパンでも食えないパン)	May 31, 2017
10	10	"The Culprit is Koro-nee"; Transliteration: "Hannin wa Koro Ane" (Japanese: 犯人はコロ姐)	June 7, 2017
11	11	"Chinkobozu Finally Has His Turn"; Transliteration: "Yatto De-tachin Ko Bōzu" (Japanese: やっと出たちんこ坊主)	June 14, 2017
12	12	"Romantic Flight Toward Season 2"; Transliteration: "Niki e Roman Hikō" (Japanese: 二期へ浪漫飛行)	June 21, 2017

==== Season 2 (2017) ====
No. overall	No. in season	Title	Original release date
1	13	"Our New Rival Is Noodles"; Transliteration: "Atarashī Raibaru wa Men" (Japanese: 新しいライバルは麺)	October 7, 2017
2	14	"Based on the Original Concept, Love Rice Is Really Meant to Be Aimed at Girls"; Transliteration: "Tōsho no Konseputo da to Rabu Kone wa Ichiō Joshi-Muke" (Japanese: 当初のコンセプトだとラブ米は一応女子向け)	October 14, 2017
3	15	"School HarveStar Love Rice"; Transliteration: "Sukūru Hābesutā・Rabu Raisu" (Japanese: スクールハーベスター・ラブライス)	October 21, 2017
4	16	"The Legendary Six Rice Boys (Mixed Rice)"; Transliteration: "Maboroshi no 6-ri Kome (Shikkusu Raisu)" (Japanese: 幻の6人米（シックスライス）)	October 28, 2017
5	17	"Weakling Rice"; Transliteration: "Yowamushi Raisu" (Japanese: 弱虫ライス)	November 4, 2017
6	18	"The Grain King"; Transliteration: "Koku☆Mono☆Ō" (Japanese: 穀☆物☆王)	November 11, 2017
7	19	"Riceside Shakedown: the Movie"; Transliteration: "Odori! Taki Sōsa-sen The Movie" (Japanese: 踊り！炊き走査線 The Movie)	November 18, 2017
8	20	"Love Rice Needs a Scolding!!"; Transliteration: "Okora Rero Rabu Raisu!!" (Japanese: 怒られろラブライス!!)	November 25, 2017
9	21	"Your Rice Name."; Transliteration: "Kome no Na wa" (Japanese: 米の名は。)	December 2, 2017
10	22	"Go Forth, CaKing!"; Transliteration: "Sore Yuke! Kēkingu!" (Japanese: それゆけ！ケーキング)	December 9, 2017
11	23	"The Fake Sho Is Really a Carbohydrate-Free Diet"; Transliteration: "Nise Shō no Shōtai wa Tansuikabutsu Nuki Daietto" (Japanese: 偽ショウの正体は炭水化物抜きダイエット)	December 16, 2017
12	24	"Romantic Flight Toward the Game"; Transliteration: "Gēmu e no Roman Hikō" (Japanese: ゲームへの浪漫飛行)	December 23, 2017

=== Stage plays ===
The series received several stage plays in 2017 and 2018.

== See also ==
- Cooking manga
