= The Caligula Effect =

2016 video game

- Developers: Aquria; Historia (Overdose) (Note: Ported to Windows and Nintendo Switch by Engine Software BV.)
- Publishers: JP: FuRyu; WW: Atlus (Vita); WW: NIS America (Overdose)
- Director: Takuya Yamanaka
- Artist: Oguchi
- Writer: Tadashi Satomi
- Composer: Tsukasa Masuko
- Engine: Unreal Engine 4 (Overdose)
- Platforms: PlayStation Vita; PlayStation 4; Windows; Nintendo Switch
- Release: June 23, 2016: PlayStation Vita; JP: June 23, 2016; NA: May 2, 2017; EU: May 9, 2017; Overdose; PlayStation 4; JP: May 17, 2018; NA: March 12, 2019; EU: March 15, 2019 Windows, Nintendo Switch; NA: March 12, 2019; JP: March 14, 2019 (Note: Windows version was released on March 13, 2019); EU: March 15, 2019
- Genre: Role-playing

The Caligula Effect (Note: Known in Japan as Caligula (カリギュラ, Karigyura)) is a 2016 role-playing video game developed by Aquria. It was released for the PlayStation Vita in Japan in June 2016, and by Atlus USA in North America and Europe in May 2017. A remake of the game, The Caligula Effect: Overdose, (Note: Known in Japan as Caligula: Overdose (カリギュラ オーバードーズ, Karigyura Ōbādōzu)) was released for the PlayStation 4 in Japan in May 2018, and worldwide by NIS America in March 2019 for the PlayStation 4, Nintendo Switch, and Windows. An anime adaptation of the same name premiered in April 2018.

A sequel, The Caligula Effect 2, was released for the PlayStation 4 and Nintendo Switch in Japan on June 24, 2021.

== Gameplay ==
The Caligula Effect is a role-playing video game featuring turn-based combat in dungeon environments. Combat is triggered upon encountering enemy characters during dungeon exploration. A party can consist of four playable characters maximum. There are 9 main characters that can be used in the party as the story progresses. Any NPC can be recruited into the party after obtaining level 2 or higher association. Three commands can be chained together per turn for each party member and can preview its effect before initiating. Players can raise association with other NPCs by interacting with them. Certain NPCs are not accessible until specific NPC association is gained. After reaching a certain amount of association, side-quests are unlocked for specific NPCs.

== Premise ==
The Caligula Effect is set in a virtual reality program known as "Mobius", created so people can escape pain in their lives within reality and live in an idyllic high school setting, forced to live out their 3 years indefinitely. The main protagonist is one of the group who realizes that they are in a virtual world, and ally with the former keeper of Mobius, "Aria" to form the "Go-Home Club", a group dedicated to escaping from Mobius and its god-like overseer program, a vocal program called "μ". They oppose the "Ostinato Musicians", a group who supports μ and sees the Go-Home Club as traitors.

== Development ==
The Caligula Effect was developed by FuRyu and published worldwide by Atlus USA. It was directed by Takuya Yamanaka, with character designs by Oguchi. It was written by Tadashi Satomi, who had previously worked on the first three games in the Persona series – Revelations: Persona, Persona 2: Innocent Sin and Persona 2: Eternal Punishment. The music was written by former Megami Tensei series composer Tsukasa Masuko, and the theme song is performed by a three-person group: Eriko Nakamura, Emi Nitta and Yuka Ōtsubo. The developers define Caligula as a "next-generation juvenile RPG" focusing on modern pathology and trauma.

The characters were said to violate a variety of taboos, with Satomi specifically creating one that the team were initially wanting to avoid. The title stems from the psychological term "Caligula effect", referring to the want to see and do prohibited things. Despite its prominence and tying into the gameplay experience, the word itself is not mentioned within the game's context.

The game was first announced on February 23, 2016 in that week's issue of Famitsu, along with its release date. At the time it was announced, it was said to be 50% complete. A teaser trailer and the first screenshots was released soon after the initial announcement.

== Release ==
The game was released by FuRyu for the PlayStation Vita in Japan on June 23, 2016, and was released by Atlus USA in North America on May 2, 2017, and in Europe on May 9. An anime adaptation, Caligula, premiered in Japan in April 2018.

In November 2017, a remake titled The Caligula Effect: Overdose was announced. It was released in Japan for the PlayStation 4 on May 18, 2018, and by NIS America for the PlayStation 4, Nintendo Switch, Windows in North America on March 12, 2019, and in Europe on March 15, 2019. The remake, developed by the studio Historia using Unreal Engine 4, features upgraded visuals and gameplay, a new playable female protagonist, new endings, and more supporting characters.

== Reception ==
Reception

Aggregate score
Aggregator	Score
Metacritic	Vita: 58/100; PS4: 64/100; NS: 60/100

Review scores
Publication	Score
Destructoid	4/10
Famitsu	Vita: 30/40; PS4: 33/40

The Caligula Effect received "mixed or average reviews" from critics, according to review aggregator Metacritic. Famitsu scored the original version of the game with a 30 out of 40 rating, with an 8/7/8/7 out of 10 breakdown among the four reviewers. Josh Tolentino from Destructoid gave the game 4/10, praising the fresh idea and the battle system of the game, but criticized the shallow character bonding system, the long length of battles and the poor performance of the game on the PlayStation Vita.

The remake fared better among reviewers, with Famitsu giving it with a higher 33 out of 40 score, consisting of ratings from four critics who individually gave it 9/8/8/8.

It was the second best selling video game in Japan during its opening week, with 31,243 copies sold. During its second week, it dropped to eleventh place, with an additional 7,289 copies sold. The PlayStation 4 version sold 20,399 copies within its first week on sale in Japan, placing it at first on the all format sales chart.
