= Escape Academy =

2022 video game

- Developer: Coin Crew Games
- Publishers: iam8bit; Skybound Games
- Directors: Wyatt Bushnell; Mike Salyh
- Writers: Michael C. Rogers; Blair Lachlan Scott
- Composer: doseone
- Platforms: PlayStation 4; PlayStation 5; Windows; Xbox One; Xbox Series X/S; Nintendo Switch
- Release: Playstation 4, Playstation 5, Windows, Xbox One, Xbox Series X; July 14, 2022; Nintendo Switch; September 12, 2023
- Genres: Adventure, puzzle
- Modes: Single-player, multiplayer

Escape Academy is a 2022 puzzle video game developed by Coin Crew Games and published by iam8bit and Skybound Games. It was released for Windows, PlayStation 4, PlayStation 5, Xbox One and Xbox Series X/S on July 14, 2022, to a generally positive reception.

A sequel, Escape Academy 2: Back 2 School, was released on November 5th, 2026.

== Gameplay ==
In Escape Academy, players assume the role of students who undergo training to become a skilled "Escape Room Master". Its gameplay is patterned after that of real-world escape room activities, where players are supposed to work together to discover clues, solve puzzles, and accomplish tasks in one or more rooms to achieve a specific goal within a finite amount of time. Played from a first-person perspective, players earn grades by solving escape rooms themed after various academic subjects.

== Development and release ==
Escape Academy is developed by Coin Crew Games, a video game development studio founded in 2018, with its production led by studio co-founders Mike Salyh and Wyatt Bushnell. With iam8bit and Skybound Games as publishers, it was launched on July 14, 2022 for Windows, PlayStation 4, PlayStation 5, Xbox One and Xbox Series X/S.

== Reception ==
Reception

Aggregate scores
Aggregator	Score
Metacritic	PC: 79/100; PS5: 79/100; XSXS: 76/100
OpenCritic	88% recommend

Review scores
Publication	Score
Electronic Gaming Monthly	4/5
GameSpot	7/10
Hardcore Gamer	4/5
RPGFan	74/100
Shacknews	8/10

Escape Academy received "generally favorable" reviews from critics, according to review aggregator Metacritic. Fellow review aggregator OpenCritic assessed that the game received strong approval, being recommended by 88% of critics. Jordan Ramée from GameSpot praised the gameplay design behind each escape room which he found rewarding for co-operative play in multiplayer mode, as it allows all players to easily work together and contribute productively, and that the puzzles had enough variety to "challenge both logical and creative thinking". On the other hand, he felt that solo play is much less fulfilling due to the emphasis on collaborative play between players, and that the narrative detracts from the escape room gameplay experience. Kyle LeClair from Hardcore Gamer gave a positive review, and said he was hopeful that Escape Academy would be successful enough to warrant a sequel. Ozzie Mejia from Shacknews lauded Escape Academy as one of the best cooperative gaming experiences of 2022.
