= Nightmare discography =

Japanese visual kei rock band

- Studio albums: 11
- Live albums: 4
- Compilation albums: 12
- Singles: 38
- Video albums: 29
- Music videos: 73

Nightmare is a Japanese visual kei rock band formed in January 2000. They have released eleven studio albums, twelve compilation albums and thirty-eight singles. Most of their albums and singles have been released in three formats—two with bonus DVDs and one CD only (often with bonus tracks).

== Studio albums ==
Year	Album details	Oricon chart position
2003	Ultimate Circus: Released: December 25, 2003; Label: Nippon Crown	115
2004	Livid: Released: November 25, 2004; Label: Nippon Crown	29
2006	Anima: Released: February 22, 2006; Label: Nippon Crown	12
2007	The World Ruler: Released: February 28, 2007; Label: VAP	6
2008	Killer Show: Released: May 21, 2008; Label: VAP	5
2009	Majestical Parade: Released: May 13, 2009; Label: VAP	3
2011	Nightmare: Released: November 23, 2011; Label: Avex	10
2013	Scums: Released: January 30, 2013; Label: Avex	8
2014	TO BE OR NOT TO BE: Released: March 19, 2014; Label: Avex	10
2015	Carpe Diem: Released: March 25, 2015; Label: Avex	7
2022	Nox:Lux: Released: March 16, 2022; Label: Little Hearts Music	15

== Live albums ==
Release date	Album details	Oricon Peak
February 27, 2008	Kyokuto Symphony: The Five Stars Night @Budokan	11
August 25, 2010	Nightmare 10th Anniversary Special Act Vol.1 Gianizm Fukumetsu Tenma (〜天魔覆滅〜)	14
June 6, 2012	Nightmare Tour 2011-2012 Nightmarish Reality Tour Final @Nippon Budokan	61
August 21, 2013	NIGHTMARE TOUR 2013: beautiful SCUMS	7

== Compilation albums ==
Release date	Album details	Oricon Peak
June 21, 2006	Gianism Best Ofs	—
January 30, 2008	Nightmare 2003-2005 Single Collection	25
January 1, 2010	Gianizm	19
October 20, 2010	Historical ~The Highest Nightmare~	14
November 25, 2015	best tracks 2011-2015 (beást)	56
January 16, 2016	best tracks 2006-2010 (vapor)	40
March 23, 2016	best tracks 2000-2005 (ćlowns)	42
March 5, 2020	20th Anniversary NIGHTMARE PERSONAL BEST 柩 Edition	—
June 9, 2020	20th Anniversary NIGHTMARE PERSONAL BEST RUKA Edition	—
June 23, 2020	20th Anniversary NIGHTMARE PERSONAL BEST Ni~ya Edition	—
June 29, 2020	20th Anniversary NIGHTMARE PERSONAL BEST 咲人 Edition	—
July 14, 2020	20th Anniversary NIGHTMARE PERSONAL BEST YOMI Edition	—

== Video albums ==
Release date	Album details	Oricon Peak
June 5, 2002	Gaia -Zenith Side- (ガイア -Zenith Side-)	—
August 21, 2002	Gaia -Nadir Side- (ガイア -Nadir Side-)	—
February 25, 2004	Ultimate Circus Finale	52
December 22, 2004	Love [CLIp]per	85
March 9, 2005	Tour CPU 2004GHz	—
September 21, 2005	Love [CLIIp]per	115
December 21, 2005	Tenka Daibousou (天下大暴走)	107
June 28, 2006	Tour [Anima]lism	47
December 26, 2006	Love [CLIIIp]per	73
January 1, 2007	Tour 2006 Gianism Tsuu (ジャイアニズム痛)	70
September 12, 2007	Vision of the World Ruler	14
February 27, 2008	Kyokuto Symphony: The Five Stars Night @Budokan	11
December 17, 2008	Nightmare Tour 2008 Grand Killer Show	43
March 18, 2009	Love [CLIp]per IV	51
August 26, 2009	Love [CLIp]per V	85
December 2, 2009	Parade Tour Final "Majestic"	24
August 25, 2010	Nightmare 10th Anniversary Special Act Vol.1 Gianizm Fukumetsu Tenma (〜天魔覆滅〜)	22
June 6, 2012	Nightmare Tour 2011-2012 Nightmarish reality Tour Final @Nippon Budokan	11
August 21, 2013	NIGHTMARE TOUR 2013: beautiful SCUMS	4
November 19, 2014	NIGHTMARE TOUR 2014 TO BE OR NOT TO BE: That is the Question.TOUR FINAL	1
October 28, 2015	NIGHTMARE 15th Anniversary Tour CARPE DIEMeme TOUR FINAL	9
November 8, 2016	Historical〜The highest NIGHTMARE〜in Makuhari Messe＆Fury & the Beast TOUR FINAL	—
November 23, 2016	NIGHTMARE TOUR 2016 Awakening of Clowns	—
November 23, 2016	love[CLIP]per VI	—
March 15, 2017	NIGHTMARE FINAL “NOT THE END”	18
March 15, 2017	love[CLIP]per VII	—
July 15, 2020	NIGHTMARE 20th Anniversary SPECIAL LIVE GIANIZM ~ Saiaku ~ (再悪)	15
July 27, 2022	TOUR 2022 NOX:LUX	—
April 4, 2025	Tenka Saibousou (天下再暴走)	15

== Singles ==
	Release date	Title	Oricon Peak	Other Information	Album
1st	unclear	"vice"	—	Limited sale at live venues	
2nd	2001/10/21 (1st press) and 2001/11/11 (2nd press)	"Hankouki (犯行期)"	—	1st and 2nd press limited to 1000 copies	
3rd	2002/02/21	"Jiyuu Honpo Tenshin Ranman (自由奔放天真爛漫)"	—	1st press limited to 2000 copies and 2nd press limited to 3000 copies	
4th	2002/10/31	"Crash!? Nightmare Channel (クラッシュ!?ナイトメアチャンネル)"	—	Limited to mail order 2000 copies	
5th	2003/08/21	"-Believe-"	24		Ultimate Circus
6th	2003/11/21	"Akane (茜)/Hate/Over"	25	Croket! ED theme.	Ultimate Circus
7th	2004/04/21	"Varuna"	29		Livid
8th	2004/07/22	"Tokyo Shounen (東京傷年)"	21		Livid
9th	2004/10/21	"Shian (シアン)"	22		Livid
10th	2005/04/01	"Jibun no Hana (時分ノ花)"	21		Anima
11th	2005/08/10	"Яaven Loud Speeeaker"	23		Anima
12th	2005/12/07	"LivEvil"	29		Anima
13th	2006/10/18	"The World/Alumina (アルミナ)"	5	Death Note OP theme/ED theme.	The World Ruler
14th	2007/06/06	"Raison D'etre (レゾンデートル)"	3	Claymore OP Theme	Killer Show
15th	2007/10/03	"Konoha (このは)"	4	Ongaku Senshi Music Fighter ED Theme	Killer Show
16th	2007/11/07	"Dirty"	8	Majin Tantei Nougami Neuro OP Theme	Killer Show
17th	2008/09/17	"Lost in Blue"	4	Mouryou no Hako OP theme.	Majestical Parade
18th	2008/12/03	"Naked Love"	5	Mouryou no Hako ED theme.	Majestical Parade
19th	2009/09/22	"Rem_"	3	Futtonda ED theme.	Nightmare
20th	2010/06/23	"A:Fantasia"	5		Nightmare
21st	2011/05/18	"Vermilion"	6	V no Ryuugi OP Theme	Nightmare
22nd	2011/09/07	"Sleeper"	7	Tie-in CM song with GemCerey	Nightmare
23rd	2012/02/29	"Mimic"	9	TV Asahi's Break Out OP Track	Scums
24th	2012/11/28	"Deus ex Machina"	11		Scums
25th	2013/8/21	"Dizzy"	13		TO BE OR NOT TO BE
26th	2014/1/8	"Rewrite"	2		TO BE OR NOT TO BE
27th	2014/6/25	"TABOO"	6		Carpe Diem
28th	2015/1/7	"Blur"	8		Carpe Diem
29th	2015/10/28	"Rakuen (落園)"	15		
30th	2016/03/23	"Awakening"	10	"Leave! In Akko" ending theme	
31st	2020/10/07	"ink"	8	TV Asahi's "BREAK OUT" October 2020 OP "Fear (2nd track on single)" featured for Fuji TV's "Tune" November monthly artist	NOX:LUX
32nd	2021/03/03	"cry for the moon"	3	Nippon Television's "Buzz Rhythm 02" March 2021 OP theme	NOX:LUX
33rd	2021/11/17	"Sinners"	13	TV Tokyo's "Duel Masters King!" OP theme	NOX:LUX
34th	2022/11/16	"With"	13	"The Last Summoner" JP Dub OP theme	
35th	2023/03/29	"FAREWELL"	13	Nippon Television's "Buzz Rhythm 02" April 2023 ED theme	
36th	2023/11/08	"Rebel"	13		
37th	2024/08/21	"Kuon (久遠)"	—	Streaming only single	
38th	2024/08/21	"Labyrinth"	—	Streaming only single	

== Music videos ==
1. Jishou (Shounen Terrorist)
2. Gianizm Tsuu (Shougai Minagoroshi)
3. Believe
4. Akane
5. Hate
6. Varuna
7. Tokyo Shounen
8. Tsuki no Hikari, Utsutsu no Yume
9. Sekishoku
10. Shian
11. Jibun no Hana
12. Dasei Boogie
13. Яaven Loud Speeeaker
14. Nazuki
15. Jashin to Bara
16. LivEvil
17. Mary
18. The World
19. Alumina
20. Criminal Baby
21. Gianizm Shichi
22. Dirty
23. Moebius no Yuutsu
24. Raison D'Etre
25. Konoha
26. Cloudy Dayz
27. White Room
28. The Last Show
29. Lost in Blue
30. Kaikou Catharsis
31. Naked Love
32. Mad Black Machine
33. Melody
34. Can you do it?
35. Gianizm Shi
36. Gianizm Ten
37. Rem_
38. Love Addict
39. Vermilion.
40. ByeBye
41. A:Fantasia
42. Romeo
43. Swallowtail
44. Ray of Light
45. Sleeper
46. Star Spangled Breaker
47. mimic
48. Paranoid
49. Deus ex Machina
50. Ugly Duck's Will
51. ASSaulter
52. Owaru Sekai no Hajimari wa Kinari
53. Dizzy
54. I'm high roller
55. Rewrite
56. Isolation
57. Gallows
58. Drastica
59. TABOO
60. Aizou Rondo
61. Blur
62. Buddies
63. Quints
64. Rakuen
65. empty.
66. Awakening.
67. ink
68. cry for the moon
69. Sinners
70. Re:Do
71. With
72. FAREWELL
73. Rebel

== Demotapes & Mini albums ==
=== Demos ===
- "Sabato (サバト)" (2001)
- "Danzai (断罪)"
- "5 + 1 = ?" (2001)
- "Yaen (夜宴)" (April 2001)
- "Untitled" (July 13, 2001)
- "Zange (懺悔)" (August 15, 2001)
- "Akahana no Tonakai (赤鼻のトナカイ)" (December 25, 2001)

=== Mini albums ===
- Outlaw (アウトロー)

- Release Date: November 21, 2002
- Oricon Peak Position: #113

== Omnibus appearances ==
Year	Release date	Album details
2001	December 21, 2001	Sendai City Rock Hero'Z
2002	February, 2002	Band Yarouze (ばんどやろうぜ, Let's do the band)
2002	March 14, 2002	Decadence 2002
2002	October 1, 2002	Shock Jam CD Edition.1
2002	October 21, 2002	Shock Edge 2002
2011	September 14, 2011	V-Rock Disney
