= Carpe diem (disambiguation) =

Carpe diem is a Latin phrase, usually translated "seize the day".

Carpe diem may also refer to:

== Music ==
=== Albums and EPs ===
- Carpe diem (Lara Fabian album), 1994
- Carpe Diem (Will Haven album), 2001
- Carpe Diem (Heavenly album), 2009
- Carpe Diem (Belinda Peregrín album), 2010
- Carpe Diem (Aqua Timez album), 2011
- Carpe Diem (Karyn White album), 2012
- Carpe Diem (Nightmare album), 2015
- Carpe Diem (Hande Yener album), 2020
- Carpe Diem (Olamide album), 2020
- Carpe Diem (Saxon album), 2022
- Carpe Diem, a 2000 album by Pretty Maids
- Carpe Diem, a 2011 album by Josh Dubovie
- Carpe Diem, the 2017 debut EP by Skye

=== Songs ===
- "Carpe Diem" (Joker Out song), 2023
- "Carpe Diem", a song by The Fugs from the 1965 album The Fugs First Album
- "Carpe Diem", the third part of the title track of the 1995 EP A Change of Seasons by Dream Theater
- "Carpe Diem", a song by Nebula from the 2003 album Atomic Ritual
- "Carpe Diem", a song by Counterparts from the 2010 album Prophets
- "Carpe Diem", a song by August Burns Red from the 2011 album Leveler
- "Carpe Diem", a song by Green Day from the 2012 album ¡Uno!
- "Carpe Diem", a song by You Me at Six from the 2014 album Cavalier Youth
- "Carpe Diem", the ending theme of the anime television series The World Ends with You: The Animation

=== Other uses in music ===
- Carpe Diem String Quartet, an American string quartet
- Carpe Diem Tour, a 2012 concert tour by Chris Brown

== Other uses ==
- Carpe Diem (comic strip), a comic strip by Niklas Eriksson
- Carpe Diem (drink), a range of energy and functional soft drinks distributed by Raunch
- The Carpe Diem Trust, a British charitable trust
- Carpe Diem, a 1989 novel in the Agent of Change sequence by Sharon Lee and Steve Miller

== See also ==
- Karpe Diem, a Norwegian hip hop group
- Carpe noctem (disambiguation)
- Seize the Day (disambiguation)
