= Natsuhiko Kyogoku =

Japanese mystery writer

- Born: 26 March 1963 (age 63); Hokkaido, Japan
- Occupation: Writer
- Writing career
- Language: Japanese
- Period: 1994–present
- Genres: Fiction, mystery, horror
- Notable works: The Summer of the Ubume, Requiem from the Darkness
- Notable awards: Mystery Writers of Japan Award (1996); Naoki Prize (2004)

Signature
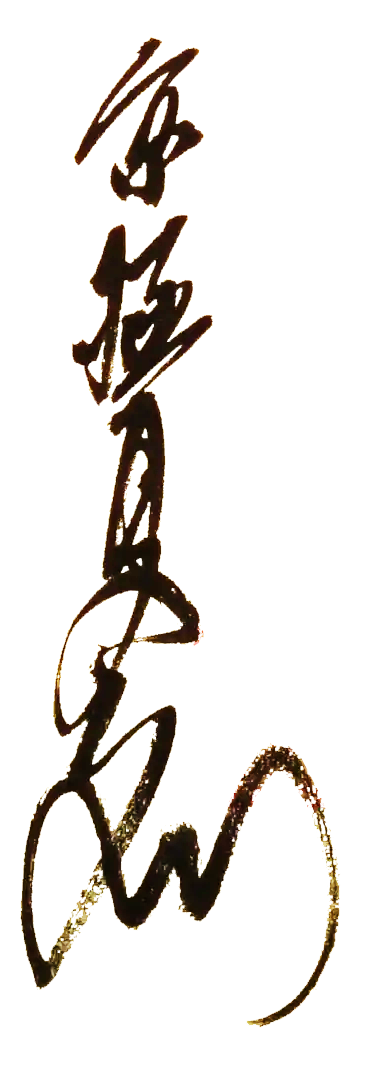

Natsuhiko Kyogoku (京極 夏彦, Kyōgoku Natsuhiko; born March 26, 1963) is a Japanese mystery writer, who is a member of Ōsawa Office. He is a member of the Mystery Writers of Japan and the Honkaku Mystery Writers Club of Japan.

Three of his novels have been turned into feature films; Mōryō no Hako, which won the 1996 Mystery Writers of Japan Award, was also made into an anime television series, as was Kosetsu Hyaku Monogatari, and his book Loups=Garous was adapted into an anime feature film. Vertical have published his debut novel as The Summer of the Ubume.

== Background ==
Kyogoku was born in Otaru, Hokkaido. After dropping out of Kuwasawa Design School, he worked as a publicity agent and established a design company. In 1994, Kodansha published his first novel The Summer of the Ubume (姑獲鳥の夏, Ubume no Natsu). He has since written many novels, and received two Japanese literary prizes; Kyogoku won the 16th Yamamoto Shūgorō Prize for Nozoki Koheiji (覘き小平次) in 2003, and won the 130th Naoki Prize for Nochi no Kōsetsu Hyaku Monogatari (後巷説百物語) in 2004.

Most of his works are concerned with yōkai, creatures from Japanese folklore; he describes himself as a yōkai researcher. This preference was strongly influenced by Shigeru Mizuki (水木しげる), who is an eminent yokai specialist. Kyogoku participates in Mizuki's World Yōkai Association and is a member of the Kanto Mizuki Association and the Research Institute of Mysterious and Marvelous East Asian phenomena.

=== Yōkai ===
Kyogoku considers yōkai folklore to be a form of sublimation and applied this idea to his novels. His works are often advertised as yōkai novels by the publisher, and their covers reflect this. Nevertheless, in his writing, yōkai themselves don't appear, except as fables, which serve to explicate the criminal characters' motives. For example, in The Summer of the Ubume, ubume is introduced as part of a ghostly expectant mother folklore, considered to be an expression of hate. However, ubume doesn't actually appear until the end.

=== Tsukimono-Otoshi ===
In Kyogoku's works, especially the Kyōgokudō (京極堂) Series, the main character Akihiko Chuzenji (中禅寺 秋彦, Chūzenji Akihiko) solves a case by clearing up a possession; this technique is called Tsukimono-Otoshi, the most striking aspect of his novels. This term is from Onmyōdō: the exorcism of yōkai, demons or ghosts. Chuzenji does Tsukimono-Otoshi as part of his rhetoric he uses in exposing the criminal character's hidden pathos, and likens the emotion to a particular yōkai folklore. This often solves the mystery, but this result is only an unexpected by-product for Chuzenji.

=== Book Design ===
Another characteristic of his work is book design: cover, thickness and layout. As explained above, he has founded a design company before, and after he became a novelist, has been working as a designer too. Therefore, remarkably for novelists, he is always concerned with the binding process of his works directly, and sometimes designs other novelists' books, e.g., Gankyū Kitan (眼球綺譚), Yukito Ayatsuji (綾辻行人).

==== Cover ====
Kyogoku's books' covers are elaborately designed to match their themes. In Kyōgokudō Series, the covers always represent yōkai featured in each weird story. In Kodansha Novels version of this series, the covers are illustrations drawn by Shirou Tatsumi (辰巳四郎) and Ayako Ishiguro (石黒亜矢子), and in Kodansha Bunko version, the covers are photographs of paper dolls made by Ryō Arai (荒井良). In Kosetsu Hyaku Monogatari Series, the covers also represent yōkai, and as for the first edition of this series, the reverse sides of covers are fearful ukiyo-e which connect the story, e.g., Ono no Komachi Kyūsōzu (小野小町九相図). On the other hand, unlike these horror works, in Dosukoi Series, because these novels are comedies burlesquing other Japanese novels, the covers always represent funny fat sumo wrestlers.

==== Thickness ====
Almost all Kyogoku's books, especially Kyōgokudō Series, are very thick in comparison with other Japanese novels. For example, Tesso no Ori (鉄鼠の檻) is 826 pages long, Jorōgumo no Kotowari (絡新婦の理) is 829 pages long, Nuribotoke no Utage, Utage no Shitaku (塗仏の宴 宴の支度) and Nuribotoke no Utage, Utage no Shimatsu (塗仏の宴 宴の始末), a novel in two volumes, is 1248 pages long in total. Because of the thickness, his books look like bricks or dice, and are often called "brick books" or "dice books".

==== Layout ====
The layout of Kyogoku's writing is arranged according to his own rules. A sentence never crosses over a page break. Moreover, every time a new version is published, Kyogoku always lays out the work again according to this rule. He explained the intention, "I made it possible for readers to stop reading whenever they want to. If one sentence steps over, readers who are weary of reading must turn over the page. I sense that is contemptible, because not interest to the story but physical factor force readers to read." Second, many kanji characters in his writing are invariably given kana characters alongside. Kyogoku can use DTP software perfectly, so he freely writes old-fashioned characters and ateji characters with the purpose of capturing old Japanese atmosphere in his novels. However, such characters are difficult even for Japanese people to read. Therefore, giving kana characters alongside kanji characters in his writing is essential for readers to be able to understand those characters' meaning. Third, sentences are marked out by entering null lines before and after them on purpose. That technique enables readers to perceive the curious blank where the important sentences are written. In these ways, Kyogoku always keeps readability in mind, and dedicates himself not only to sentences but also the layout. These qualities do not, however, carry over to the English translations of his books.

== Works in English translation ==
Kyōgokudō series

- The Summer of the Ubume (original title: Ubume no Natsu), trans. Alexander O. Smith (Vertical, 2009)

Loups-Garous series

- Loups-Garous (original title: Rū Garū), trans. Anne Ishii (Viz Media, 2010)

The Wicked and the Damned: A Hundred Tales of Karma series

1. "The Bean Washer" (original title: "Azukiarai"), trans. Ian M. MacDonald (Creek & River Co., Ltd, 2015)
2. "The Fox Priest" (original title: "Hakuzōsu"), trans. Ian M. MacDonald (Creek & River Co., Ltd, 2015)
3. "The Flying Heads" (original title: "Maikubi"), trans. Ian M. MacDonald (Creek & River Co., Ltd, 2015)
4. "Shibaemon the Raccoon-Dog" (original title: "Shibaemon Tanuki"), trans. Ian M. MacDonald (Creek & River Co., Ltd, 2016)
5. "Chojiro the Horse-Eater" (original title: "Shio no Choji"), trans. Ian M. MacDonald (Creek & River Co., Ltd, 2016)
6. "The Willow Woman" (original title: "Yanagi Onna"), trans. Ian M. MacDonald (Creek & River Co., Ltd, 2016)
7. "The Corpse at the Crossroads" (original title: "Katabira-ga-Tsuji"), trans. Ian M. MacDonald (Creek & River Co., Ltd, 2016)

Standalone crime novel

- Why Don't You Just Die? (original title: Shineba Ii no ni), trans. Takami Nieda (Kodansha, 2011)

Short story

- Three Old Tales of Terror (original title: Dare ga Tsukutta, Nani ga Shitai, Doko ni Ita), trans. Rossa O'Muireartaigh (Kaiki: Uncanny Tales from Japan, Volume 1: Tales of Old Edo, Kurodahan Press, 2009)

== Awards ==
- 1996 - Mystery Writers of Japan Award for Best Novel: Mōryō no Hako (Box of Goblins)
- 1997 - Izumi Kyōka Prize for Literature: Warau Iemon (Laughing Iemon)
- 2003 - Yamamoto Shūgorō Prize: Nozoki Koheiji (Peeping Koheiji)
- 2004 - Naoki Prize: Nochi no Kōsetsu Hyaku Monogatari (Still More Ghost Stories from About Town)
- 2011 - Shibata Renzaburo Award: Nishi no Kōsetsu Hyaku Monogatari (Ghost Stories from About Town in the West)

== Bibliography ==
=== Kyōgokudō Series ===
Kyōgokudō (京極堂) Series

- Novels
  - Ubume no Natsu (姑獲鳥の夏) (1994) /The Summer of the Ubume, (Natsuhiko Kyogoku, Vertical, 2009)
  - Mōryō no Hako (魍魎の匣) (1995)
  - Kyōkotsu no Yume (狂骨の夢) (1995)
  - Tesso no Ori (鉄鼠の檻) (1996)
  - Jorōgumo no Kotowari (絡新婦の理) (1996)
  - Nuribotoke no Utage, Utage no Shitaku (塗仏の宴 宴の支度) (1998)
  - Nuribotoke no Utage, Utage no Shimatsu (塗仏の宴 宴の始末) (1998)
  - Onmoraki no Kizu (陰摩羅鬼の瑕) (2003)
  - Jyami no Shizuku (邪魅の雫) (2006)
- Short story collections
  - Hyakkiyakō—In (百鬼夜行――陰) (1999)
  - Hyakkitsurezurebukuro—Ame (百器徒然袋――雨) (1999)
  - Konjakuzokuhyakki—Kumo (今昔続百鬼――雲) (2001)
  - Hyakkitsurezurebukuro—Kaze (百器徒然袋――風) (2004)
  - Hyakkiyakō—Yō (百鬼夜行――陽) (2012)

=== Koten Kaisaku Series ===
Koten Kaisaku (古典改作) Series

- Warau Iemon (嗤う伊右衛門) (1997)
- Nozoki Koheiji (覘き子平次) (2002)
- Kazoezu no Ido (数えずの井戸) (2010)

=== Kōsetsu Hyaku Monogatari (A Hundred Tales of Karma) Series ===
Kōsetsu Hyaku Monogatari (A Hundred Tales of Karma) Series

- Kōsetsu Hyaku Monogatari (巷説百物語) (1999) (The Wicked and the Damned: A Hundred Tales of Karma)
- Zoku Kōsetsu Hyaku Monogatari (続巷説百物語) (2001)
- Nochi no Kōsetsu Hyaku Monogatari (後巷説百物語) (2003)
- Saki no Kōsetsu Hyaku Monogatari (前巷説百物語) (2007)
- Nishi no Kōsetsu Hyaku Monogatari (西巷説百物語) (2010)

=== Loup-Garou Series ===
- Loup-Garou: Kihisubeki Ōkami (ルー=ガルー 忌避すべき狼) (2001) /Loups-Garous (Natsuhiko Kyogoku, VIZ Media LLC, 2010)
- Loup-Garou 2: Incubus, Succubus, Aiirenu Muma (ルー=ガルー2 インクブス×スクブス 相容れぬ夢魔) (2011)

=== USO MAKOTO Yōkai Hyaku Monogatari Series ===
- USO MAKOTO Yōkai Hyaku Monogatari: Jo (虚実妖怪百物語 序) (Natsuhiko Kyogoku, KADOKAWA, 2016)
- USO MAKOTO Yōkai Hyaku Monogatari: Ha (虚実妖怪百物語 序) (2016)
- USO MAKOTO Yōkai Hyaku Monogatari: Kyū (虚実妖怪百物語 急) (2016)

=== Standalone novels ===
- Shineba Ii no ni (死ねばいいのに) (2010) / Why Don't You Just Die? (Natsuhiko Kyogoku, Kodansha, 2011)
- Ojīsan (オジいサン) (2011)
- Tono monogatari remix (遠野物語remix) (2013)

=== Short story collections ===
- Dosukoi (どすこい) (2000)
- Nankyoku (南極) (2008)
- Iya na Shōsetsu (厭な小説) (2009)
- Kyogen Shōnen (虚言少年) (2011)

=== Picture book ===
- Iru no Inai no (いるの いないの) (2012)

== TV and film adaptations ==
Films

- Warau Iemon (2004)
- The Summer of the Ubume (2005)
- Mōryō no Hako (2007)

Animated film

- Loups=Garous (2010)

Animated TV series

- Requiem from the Darkness (2003)
- Mōryō no Hako (2008)
