= Requiem from the Darkness =

Anime television series

- Requiem from the Darkness poster featuring Momosuke Yamaoka and the Ongyo.

京極夏彦 巷説百物語 (Kyogoku Natsuhiko Kosetsu Hyaku Monogatari)
- Created by: Natsuhiko Kyogoku
- Anime television series
- Directed by: Hideki Tonokatsu
- Produced by: Hiromichi Ōishi; Yuichi Murata; Takeyuki Okazaki
- Written by: Yoshinobu Fujioka
- Music by: Kuniaki Haishima
- Studio: TMS Entertainment
- Licensed by: AUS: Madman Entertainment; NA: Discotek Media; UK: MVM Films
- Original network: CBC, RKB, RCC, MBS
- English network: CA: G4techTV (Anime Current), Super Channel; US: Syfy
- Original run: October 3, 2003 – December 26, 2003
- Episodes: 13
- icon

Requiem from the Darkness (京極夏彦 巷説百物語, Kyōgoku Natsuhiko Kōsetsu Hyaku Monogatari; lit. 'Natsuhiko Kyogoku's Hundred Stories') is an anime television series produced by TMS Entertainment based on the series of short stories written and collected under the title The Wicked and the Damned: A Hundred Tales of Karma (巷説百物語, Kōsetsu Hyaku Monogatari) by Natsuhiko Kyogoku. The series was initially licensed in English by Geneon USA and now licensed by Discotek Media, and into a series of live action TV specials directed by Yukihiko Tsutsumi.

== Plot ==
Taking place during the Bakumatsu of the Edo period when the foundations of the Tokugawa shogunate have begun to sway, a young writer named Momosuke wishes to write a book of 100 ghost stories.

While researching, he comes across a mysterious group who call themselves the Ongyou. They are detectives who are looking into the legends to uncover the details, and hold those responsible for wrongdoing accountable. Each time Momosuke meets the Ongyou, he must face horrible truths and battle with his morals, and he's seeing things he shouldn't be seeing...

== Characters ==
Momosuke Yamaoka
Voiced by (English): Grant George
Voiced by (Japanese): Toshihiko Seki
The main protagonist of the series. A young writer from Edo who got bored writing a riddle book for kids. He now aspires to write a book of 100 ghost stories. During his adventure to gather them, he encounters the Ongyou and witnesses their methods of imposing justice upon wrongdoers. He wishes to be one of the Ongyou, but each time he asks to join them they talk him out of it. He is called "Author" by the Ongyou. At the end of the series, Momosuke finishes his 100 ghost stories.
Tsutaya
Voiced by: Hiroshi Ōtake
A small creature who is Momosuke's publisher.
Heihachi
Voiced by: Kōji Tsujitani
Heihachi is a co-worker of Momosuke.
Kyogoku Tei
Voiced by: Natsuhiko Kyogoku
The principal antagonist of the series. Kyogoku Tei is a being who serves as the superior to the Ongyō as he provides them their targets and even commissioned Momosuke's death at first to cover their existence until he saw him to be of use to his scheme. Assuming the alias of feudal lord Danjo Kitabayashi, Kyogoku Tei commits many inhuman acts as part of an overall plan to cover the world in darkness with the Flame Lance cannon. He was ultimately defeated by the Ongyou and was devoured by the very darkness of everyone who he used.
Hermits
Voiced by: Masako Nozawa
Two strange hermit ladies that work for Kyogoku Tei, serving as his messengers. On occasion they will change themselves into two young girls to trick the Ongyou into doing what they want them to. They are accidentally destroyed by Kyogoku Tei in the last episode.
Tatsuta
Voiced by: Keiko Toda
Burning her childhood friend Shiragaku to death in a jealous rage with her husband to be, Tatsuta assumes her friend's name and developed a reputation as a rumored Hi-No-Enma as she kills anyone who "loves Shiragaku." She has evaded the Ongyou for a long time. Though the Ongyou attempt to deliver judgement, the Hermits intervene and take Tatsuta to serve under Kyogoku Tei. Unaware of the full plan, she helps him by orchestrating a massacre at Seven Man Point and forcing prisoners into becoming murderous sadists for a reenactment while the Flame Lance was being rebuilt. When Kyogoku Tei is destroyed, Tatsuta is consumed in the resulting inferno.

=== Ongyou ===
The Ongyou are three spiritual beings who are recurring characters in the show. They function as a team that punishes sinners who emit a dark aura about them, most frequently murderers. To that end, they use their talents to set their target up to face his/her crimes before being executed and committing them to the next world.

Mataichi
Voiced by: Ryūsei Nakao
A small cloaked man wrapped in bandages who serves as the leader of the Ongyou. He is a spiritualist who is also referred to as a trickster while posing as a simple monk. He would usually be the one to kill the target sinner with Retributive justice and leaves an Ofuda on the body so the departed can be "sent to the next world." Nagamimi commonly calls him "trickster". At the completion of his task, he uses the phrase "ongyō shitate matsuru (御行奉為、おんぎょうしたてまつる)." The beginning of every next episode preview, except the final episode when it's Momosuke's final line, he begins with the line, "Jyashin yashin wa yami ni chiri, nokoru wa chimata no ayashii uwasa (邪心野心は闇に散り、残るは巷の怪しい噂。)."
Ogin
Voiced by: Sanae Kobayashi
A beautiful, voluptuous and large breasted female puppeteer. She is often seen using a puppet in the form of a young girl with a white powdered face and red lipstick wearing a Japanese Kimono. Fifteen years prior, Ogin and her parents were murdered by Kinzo Sasamori, a corrupt official who posed as her father Giamon of Inarizika to force the homeless people to work for him and created the rumor of Giamon as a Kowai to ensure it. As a spirit, she became a member of Ongyou to ensure that no other child suffers a fate like her own like saving her childhood friend Yae from Kichibe's madness. She often calls Momosuke a pervert due to him accidentally walking into her in a bathing room when they first met. Though she saw Momosuke to be weak for being naive, she eventually adapted his methods.
Nagamimi
Voiced by: Norio Wakamoto
A large shapeshifter and bird caller who is also extremely good at controlling animals. As the anime states, he is over 200 years old and was versed in Kabuki. He would always be the one to try to keep Momosuke from intervening with the Ongyou's targets.

== English translation ==
The Wicked and the Damned: A Hundred Tales of Karma (Kōsetsu Hyaku Monogatari)

1. "The Bean Washer" (original title: "Azukiarai"), trans. Ian M. MacDonald (Creek & River Co., Ltd, 2015)
2. "The Fox Priest" (original title: "Hakuzōsu"), trans. Ian M. MacDonald (Creek & River Co., Ltd, 2015)
3. "The Flying Heads" (original title: "Maikubi"), trans. Ian M. MacDonald (Creek & River Co., Ltd, 2015)
4. "Shibaemon the Raccoon-Dog" (original title: "Shibaemon Tanuki"), trans. Ian M. MacDonald (Creek & River Co., Ltd, 2016)
5. "Chojiro the Horse-Eater" (original title: "Shio no Choji"), trans. Ian M. MacDonald (Creek & River Co., Ltd, 2016)
6. "The Willow Woman" (original title: "Yanagi Onna"), trans. Ian M. MacDonald (Creek & River Co., Ltd, 2016)
7. "The Corpse at the Crossroads" (original title: "Katabira-ga-Tsuji"), trans. Ian M. MacDonald (Creek & River Co., Ltd, 2016)

== Anime ==
The series was animated by TMS Entertainment and directed by Hideki Tonokatsu with Hiromichi Ōishi, Yuichi Murata, and Takeyuki Okazaki as producers, Yoshinobu Fujioka handling series composition, and Kuniaki Haishima composing the music. It aired from October 4 to December 26, 2003. The opening song "The Flame" and the ending song "The Moment of Love" were both performed by Keiko Lee.

| No. | Title | Original release date | English air date |
|---|---|---|---|
| 1 | "Azuki Bean Washer"; Transliteration: "Azukiarai" (Japanese: 小豆洗い) | October 4, 2003 | October 20, 2007 (CAN); July 12, 2010 (USA) |
A writer of riddle books for children, Momosuke Yamaoka's ambition is to compile a book of 100 ghost stories. While traveling on business he is caught in a rain storm and seeks shelter at a local inn on the advice of a spiritualist named Mataichi. At the inn, Momosuke encounters Ogin and a monk named Enkai. Enkai was a former apprentice who apparently suffers delusions in which he hears the sound of azuki beans being washed. Mataichi arrives at the inn during the evening. The innkeeper Tokuemon shares the story of an apprentice boy of his who was murdered by Tokuemon's clerk Tatsugoro. He tells how the spirit of a boy named Yasuke haunts the inn as an Azukiarai. The tale provokes a strong reaction from Enkai, and together Mataichi, Ogin, and Nagamimi (who was Tokuemon in disguise) stoke Enkai's emotions provoking a breakdown. Enkai confesses to murdering the apprentice boy several years earlier in a fit of rage because Tokuemon intended to make the boy his heir rather than himself. He dies soon after and his body ending up in the nearby river as Mataichi commits Enkai's soul to the next world. When Momosuke encounters Mataichi, Ogin, and Nagamimi, he learns that they are the Ongyou. Before the Ongyou disappears, Mataichi warns Momosuke to keep his distance from them.
| 2 | "Willow Woman"; Transliteration: "Yanagi Onna" (Japanese: 柳女) | October 11, 2003 | October 27, 2007 (CAN); July 12, 2010 (USA) |
Momosuke arrives at Kichibe's Willow Inn, hoping to learn about the fabled Willow Woman who is said to haunt the inn. It is claimed that she possessively desires Kichibe, who is soon to be married, and in her jealousy was responsible for the deaths of the innkeeper's previous wives and children. At the inn Momosuke encounters the Ongyo: Mataichi, Ogin, and Nagamimi. The wedding ceremony for Kichibe and his new wife Yae goes ahead as planned, but afterwards the spiritual trio use their talents to force Kichibe to confront the Willow Woman. It transpires that she is in fact a second persona of Kichibe's, created in response to the burden of his family responsibilities and the worrisome prospect of being discarded once he produces an heir to take over the family business. Kichibe is sliced in half by the willow tree's branches soon after as Mataichi commits Kichibe's soul to the next world. Yae gives birth to a son as Momosuke is disgusted at how Kichibe's relatives pressured him to give birth to an heir.
| 3 | "Enchanted White Fox"; Transliteration: "Hakuzōsu" (Japanese: 白蔵主) | October 18, 2003 | November 3, 2007 (CAN); July 19, 2010 (USA) |
Momosuke encounters a hunter named Yasaku while investigating the tale of Hakuzōsu, a legendary fox who posed as a monk to tempt a hunter away from killing foxes. It is revealed that the legend is based on Yasaku's love for killing both animals and people. Yasaku claims that the bandit leader Izou made him kill some people. Despite Momosuke's attempts to save the murderer, Yasaku sends him off the bridge. Yasaku suffers a slow and agonizing death (offscreen) at the hands of the Ongyo before his soul committed to the next world. Momosuke is then saved from death by Nagamimi.
| 4 | "Dancing Head"; Transliteration: "Maikubi" (Japanese: 舞首) | October 25, 2003 | November 10, 2007 (CAN); July 19, 2010 (USA) |
The episode opens with a young girl, Otama, finding her sister (Oyoshi) in the next room, her head "dancing" as she moans. Momosuke arrives at a town where a woman named Oyoshi is being chased by a rōnin named Matajuro Ishikawa. Momosuke intervenes and authorities chase Matajuro away. Momosuke then ends up developing a crush on her. She admits that she is the concubine of Yahei Anzai, the head in the local fisherman's union against her will. Later, Anzai comes to visit, and it is clear that Oyoshi does not want to have sex with him with Otama in the other room. Matajuro comes to take Oyoshi away and Oyoshi has a flashback of Matajuro performing cunnilingus while Otama witnessed. During this scene, his identity as her father is revealed. He attempts to rape her, but he gets distracted by Mataichi. She convinces Matajuro that she will meet him somewhere else. The next scene is of Matajuro raping Oyoshi while Oyoshi tries to distract him into eating poisoned food. Matajuro discovers the ruse when a dog eats the food. Oyoshi claims that Anzai forced her to poison him, so an enraged Matajuro runs off to murder Anzai. Matajuro goes back to tell Oyoshi, but ends up capturing "Otama". When confronted by Momosuke and Oyoshi at Tomoei Point, Matajuro states that he killed Oyoshi's mother upon her request. He forces Oyoshi to admit that she has been caring for and speaking with Otama's corpse. Oyoshi has a flashback revealing that Oyoshi killed Otama for witnessing their incestuous acts. Just then, the authorities arrive and Matajuro dies by dismemberment. Oyoshi has hallucinations of the heads of her father, sister, and Anzai floating around in the air. At Momosuke's request, Mataichi commits Oyoshi to the next world offscreen.
| 5 | "Salty Choji"; Transliteration: "Shio no Chouji" (Japanese: 塩の長司) | November 1, 2003 | November 17, 2007 (CAN); July 26, 2010 (USA) |
Momosuke and the Ongyo are traveling in the mountains when Momosuke becomes separated from the group and reaches the mansion of a wealthy lord named Chojiro. On the verge of death, Momosuke is given horse meat to help regain his strength. This results in some memory loss and Momosuke being cursed by Hayate, the deceased spirit of the horse he ate. After inquiring of its caretaker, Momosuke learns that the lord of the castle is also a victim of the same "Salty Choji" curse. After Chojiro's daughter Osan (who was Ogin's puppet in disguise) appears, Mataichi arrives and offers to exorcise the curse if everyone afflicted will confess everything evil that they have done. When Momosuke is unable to admit anything due to his memory loss, the horse kills him. The alarmed Chojiro then confesses that he is in fact a fraud. Several years earlier, he was Hyakkimaru, a member of a bandit gang called the Mishima Night Riders and an identical twin to the real Chojiro. Chojiro betrayed the Mishima Night Riders after marrying into the wealthy family they were supposed to rob. When the two fell from a cliff during a fight, Hyakkimaru murdered his brother, cannibalised his body to survive, and assumed the real lord's identity. During that time, Osan fell off a cliff into a river and was missing. He then spent the next 11 years trying to find a meat as delicious as human flesh. With the fraud revealed, Hyakkimaru dies of fright as he is brought face to face with the conjured spirits of those he consumed. Mataichi then commits Hyakkimaru's spirit to the next world. Momosuke is actually unharmed as he was playing along in the Ongyo's performance. The Ongyo tells everyone present that the real Osan has been living in a nearby village with Master Tokujiro in Edo with amnesia. She assumes the position of head of the household.
| 6 | "The Shibaemon Raccoon Dog"; Transliteration: "Shibaemon Tanuki" (Japanese: 芝右衛門狸) | November 8, 2003 | November 24, 2007 (CAN); July 26, 2010 (USA) |
Momosuke and the Ongyou encounter a traveling performance troupe which includes a man who claims to be a Tanuki, a Raccoon Dog that assumes human form. Momosuke speaks with the man and learns that he was originally intended to be the stand in for the shōgun in the event of his death due to his perpetually poor health and lack of heir. However, this plan abruptly collapsed when a son was born to the Shogunate who could serve as a rightful heir. Thus to save her own life, the mother tried to poison Shibaemon. However, the boy switched out the drinks and the mother consumed the poison, cursing her son, which caused him to snap and kill his mother. When he joined the troupe, the troupe leader knew of his past deeds but kept him anyway out of sense of sympathy, unaware that Shibaemon killed his granddaughter some time after, as the samurai was driven mad to the point of attacking anything that he sees as a threat to him. During a performance, Momosuke and the Ongyo force Shibaemon to come to terms with his past as he dies upon being mauled by dogs unleashed by Momosuke, becoming the very animal he pretended to be. Momosuke finishes his tale in memory of the Tanuki as Mataichi commits Tanuki's soul to the next world.
| 7 | "Katabira Crossroads"; Transliteration: "Katabiragatsuji" (Japanese: 帷子辻) | November 14, 2003 | December 1, 2007 (CAN); August 2, 2010 (USA) |
Momosuke hears the legend of the Katabira Crossroads where some women have died there. He is told by Sajiro Ogata and Fushimiya that it first happened when the nobleman Genba Sasayama lost his wife to the spirit that lurks there. However, it would turn out that Genba Sasayama, the husband of the woman who first started the rumor, was driven to murder the other women of similar appearance to his wife to commit acts of Necrophilia until the body would rot and he would then dump them at the crossroads. This entire process had been repeating since he first pilfered his dead wife from her casket to again have sex with her, only to come to his senses upon decay, repeating the process indefinitely. Though the Ongyo attempted to punish Genba Sasayama by summoning the spirits of his victims, the defiant nobleman refused to accept of doing anything wrong, as he was perpetually in love with his wife, dead or alive, and took his own life when Mataichi tried to commit him to the next world as a result. Before the group departs, Nagamimi places the corpse of a puppet murderer near Genba's corpse to make it look like that he avenged his wife's death at the cost of his own life when Sajiro Ogata arrives.
| 8 | "Field Gun"; Transliteration: "Nodeppou" (Japanese: 野鉄砲) | November 21, 2003 | December 8, 2007 (CAN); August 2, 2010 (USA) |
Momosuke responds to a supposed letter from his brother Gunhachiro sent to him while at Katabira Crossroads. Gunhachiro calls him over when one of his friends named Kijirou Hamada was found dead after being killed by a stone. Momosuke says it to be a flying squirrel spirit known as a Nobusuma and a badger spirit known as a Nodeppou. They later learn from Matashiro that he used to be in a land pirate gang called The Bats that Tagamimi led. They raided Shimaso's house for a gun called the Nodeppou that shoots rocks with deadly precision. When Shimaso refuses to give it to Matashiro and Kijirou, they kill his granddaughter Otami as Shimaso is killed by Tagamimi. After telling the story, Matashiro is pursued by the Ongyou. While running from them, he falls off a cliff and impales himself on a tree. Shimaso's servant Jihei (who is possessed by Shimaso's ghost) takes Gunhachiro, Tagamimi and the rest of the troop out into the forest unaware that a possessed Jihei is killing everyone in sight except for Gunhachiro. Momosuke arrives to watch the internal battle between the Nodeppou's hatred and Shimaso's spirit. Afterwards, Mataichi sends Shimaso's spirit dwelling within the Nodeppou to rest. Momosuke then takes Jihei home.
| 9 | "Kowai, the Unkillable"; Transliteration: "Kowai" (Japanese: 孤者異) | November 29, 2003 | December 15, 2007 (CAN); August 9, 2010 (USA) |
Hearing about the murderous cutthroat Giamon of Inarizika, rumored to be a Kowai (a ghoul that can survive any fatality), Momosuke learns some of Ogin's past. It then turns out that the culprit is the Head of Public Housing named Kinzo Sasamori who has been masquerading as Giamon of Inarizika. When Kinzo starts developing a strange mole on his head, he sees a masseuse who is actually Nagamimi in disguise. Nagamimi recommends Kinzo to see Momosuke about his mole. Meanwhile, Mataichi approaches some men working for "Giamon" telling them that there is a way to kill a Kowai so that it stay's dead for good. Momosuke leads Kinzo to a spring that would cure him of an illness that is speculated by Nagamimi to turn anyone obsessed with a beast into that beast. Momosuke leads Kinzo to the entrance to the underground spring flowing from the Shrine of Inarizika in order to bathe in it. While washing the mole on his head with the water, he has an encounter with Ogin whom he recognizes as the girl he killed. He ends up attacking Ogin who dodges the attacks. Just then, Kinzo's body starts to be consumed by the mole-like markings on him. Outside, Momosuke is told by Mataichi that Giamon of Inarizika was actually a fictional creation and that the real Giamon is Ogin's father. Mataichi then states that Kinzo has been using the Giamon of Inarizika name to take advantage of the homeless people for his own profit and had poisoned the real Giamon when he found out, murdered Giamon's wife, framed Giamon for his wife's death, and executed Giamon. Just then, Kinzo emerges from the cave as a furry beast who is then impaled and beheaded by the men that Mataichi rallied. Mataichi then throws an Ofuda on Kinzo's severed head to commit him to the next world and then tells the men to burn the remains so that Kinzo can never come back to life.
| 10 | "Hi-No-Enma, Flames of Desire"; Transliteration: "Hinoenma" (Japanese: 飛縁魔) | December 6, 2003 | December 22, 2007 (CAN); August 9, 2010 (USA) |
After arriving in town, Momosuke runs into a man and learns of a missing bride Shiragiku. On his way to find out more he learns from a wayward priest named Ryojin about a tragic friendship a girl named Tatsuta and strange fires. Now while on the search for answers about the strange fires and the missing Shiragiku, Momosuke gets tangled up in a bizarre tale of jealously and stolen identity and the only answer lies on a missing pinky. When Momosuke notices that the culprit has both her pinkies, he interferes in Mataichi's judgement allowing Tatsuta to get away with the Hermits. Mataichi figures out that Kyogoku Tei was behind this and the Ongyou take their leave from Momosuke.
| 11 | "Marine Spirits"; Transliteration: "Funayuurei" (Japanese: 船幽霊) | December 13, 2003 | December 29, 2007 (CAN); August 16, 2010 (USA) |
Momosuke hasn't seen the Ongyou for months. When he asks Tsutaya if he heard any ghostly rumors lately, he tells Momosuke that there are two with one of them being the sea ghosts of Sanuki. While out walking, he comes across the Kyogoku Tavern where he has an encounter with Kyogoku Tei and the Hermits who point Momosuke to Shikoku to help the Ongyou who "vanished" while on an assignment. Momosuke comes across some fishermen who had lost some of their own to these sea ghosts. The fisherman tell Momosuke that the sea ghosts have been appearing near Kabuto Island instead of Twin Island as one of the fisherman tells him that one of the islands that make up Twin Island just vanished. The fishing magistrate Lord Sekiyama appears claiming that the sinking of boats is the work of the Kawakubo Clan and that he has taken action to remove this threat. While trying to get info on them, Momosuke is ambushed by some strange warriors only to be saved by Ogin. Ogin tells Momosuke to turn back and head home. After Ogin leaves, a man approaches Momosuke who tells him that Ogin took a boat out to sea bound for Twin Island. As the man takes Momosuke to Twin Island, he claims that the Kawakubo Clan are a bunch of ghosts of the defeated Taira Clan that clashed with the Minamoto Clan. As the boat approaches Twin Island, the sea ghosts attack. Upon being washed up on Twin Island after surviving the encounter, Momosuke has an encounter with the Kawakubo Clan until their leader Tarumaro and the Ongyou arrive as Tarumaro states that the sea is angry. Mataichi later tells Momosuke that the beaches of Twin Island were stained during the fight between the Taira Clan and the Minamoto Clan. He also states that 20 years ago, dozens of people died when the neighboring island sank. Tarumaro then explains of the Flame Lance that was entrusted to them by their ancestors which would act as a signal which would by of use when the Taira uprising occurred. Mataichi argues with Tarumaro about destroying the Flame Lance as it calls out to the darkness in people's hearts. The island is then visited by Hyogo (a man who once washed up on Twin Island and escaped from it) and some men where one of them Momosuke recognizes as one of the warriors that attacked him. Hyogo demands that the Kawakubo Clan turn themselves in when they return the next day. Mataichi tells Momosuke that Tarumaro had committed the sin of neutrality. When it comes to the next day, Tarumaro has his clan, the Ongyou, and Momosuke evacuate the island. Though Tarumaro stays behind to destroy the Flame Lance, having it sink the island with himself, Hyogo, and his men still on it. Mataichi then throws an Ofuda on the water during Twin Island's sinking committing Tarumaro's spirit to the next world while the Kawakubo Clan say goodbye to Tarumaro. When Mataichi mentions to Momosuke that he had helped in slaying some of the Ongyou's targets, they then noticed that the Hermits have salvaged what remained of the Flame Lance weapon.
| 12 | "The Death Spirits of Seven Man Point (Part 1)"; Transliteration: "Shinigami, or rather the Shichinin Misaki Part 1" (Japanese: 死神或いは七人みさき(前編)) | December 20, 2003 | January 5, 2008 (CAN); August 16, 2010 (USA) |
Strange massacres have been occurring at Seven Man Point. Momosuke encounters the man who he thought drowned helping him get to Twin Island, a ronin named Ukon Shinomore. Ukon reveals how he served under a feudal lord named Danjo Kitabayashi until an unspeakable evil plagued his land when death spirits have been appearing there. But as he journeys with Ukon to the man's homeland expecting the Ongyou to be there, Momosuke learns a horrific revelation. Meanwhile, the Ongyou discovers that Tatsuta is in cahoots with Danjo Kitabayashi.
| 13 | "The Death Spirits of Seven Man Point (Part 2)"; Transliteration: "Shinigami, or rather the Shichinin Misaki Part 2" (Japanese: 死神或いは七人みさき(後編)) | December 27, 2003 | January 12, 2008 (CAN); August 23, 2010 (USA) |
After Ukon ends up captured by Danjo's servant Kaburagi, Momosuke ends up infiltrating the dungeons to rescue him only to be caught by Tatsuta and a female accomplice of hers. While Ogin infiltrates the prison, Mataichi warns the citizens that a tsunami is approaching their land. After most of the citizens and servants have left, Danjo reveals a black panther-like Foreign Beast as part of the reenactment and disposes of Kaburagi who is killed by the Foreign Beast. When the Foreign Beast tries to attack a girl as a sacrifice, Nagamimi takes control of it and the Foreign Beast kills Tatsuta's female accomplice. As Danjo is about to fire the Flame Lance on his own people, his true identity of Kyogoku Tei is revealed as the Ongyou confront him. Kyogoku Tei tries to destroy to Ongyou only to end up accidentally destroying the Hermits. After a terrific encounter, Kyogoku Tei is sent into a pit of darkness while Tatsuta is consumed by the resulting inferno. The Ongyou say their final goodbyes to Momosuke. The series ends with Momosuke working back in his book store, and remembering his past with the ongyou claiming that he sometimes feels like they are still there watching him. The final lines of the series are Momosuke telling how he will always know there is darkness in the world, darkness that can or can not be dealt with.
