= Seize the Day =

"Seize the day" is a traditional translation of the Latin phrase carpe diem ("enjoy the day", literally "pluck (or harvest) the day").

Seize the Day may also refer to:

== Music ==
- Seize the Day (band), a British folk band
- Seize the Day (album), a 2003 album by Damien Dempsey
- "Seize the Day", a song from the 1992 film Newsies
- "Seize the Day" (song), a 2006 song by Avenged Sevenfold
- "Seize the Day", a song by Wax Tailor featuring Charlotte Savary from the 2008 film Paris
- "Seize the Day", a song by Paul McCartney from the 2020 album McCartney III

== Other uses ==
- Seize the Day (film), a 1986 American film
- Seize the Day (novel), a 1956 novel by Saul Bellow
- Seize the Day Inc., an American company

== See also ==
- Carpe diem (disambiguation)
- Seize the Night (disambiguation)
