= Anima (Nightmare album) =

anima

Studio album by Nightmare
- Released: February 22, 2006
- Genre: Gothic rock
- Length: 54:59
- Label: Nippon Crown
- Producer: Nightmare

Nightmare chronology
Livid (2004)	anima (2006)	Gianism Best Ofs (2006)

anima is Nightmare's third full-length studio album, released on February 22, 2006. and arguably, the best known. This album is considered a huge stepping stone in the band's future success. The sound of this album has a lighter and more pop feel than its predecessors, Livid and Ultimate Circus. It peaked at #12 in the Oricon Charts.

== Track listing ==
No.	Title	Length
1.	"Kuyuru (燻-くゆる-)"	4:12
2.	"Neotenii (ネオテニー)"	3:23
3.	"livEVIL"	4:03
4.	"Яaven Loud Speeeaker"	4:28
5.	"Gianism Roku (ジャイアニズム碌)"	4:22
6.	"Jashin To Bara (邪神ト薔薇)"	4:04
7.	"Sessou (雪葬)"	7:59
8.	"Mahora (まほら)"	7:41
9.	"message"	4:25
10.	"Rakuu (落羽)"	6:13
11.	"Jibun no Hana (時分ノ花)"	4:10
Total length:		54:59

== Single information ==
- Jibun no Hana (時分ノ花)

Release Date: April 1, 2005
Oricon Chart peak position: #21

- Яaven Loud Speeeaker

Release Date: August 10, 2005
Oricon Chart peak position: #23

- livEVIL

Release Date: December 7, 2005
Oricon Chart Peak Position: #29

== Personnel ==
- Yomi – vocal
- Sakito (咲人) – guitar
- Hitsugi (柩) – guitar
- Ni~ya – bass
- Ruka – drums
