= Carpe noctem =

Carpe noctem is a Latin phrase meaning "seize the night".

Carpe noctem may also refer to:

- "Carpe Noctem" (Angel), an episode of the television series Angel
- "Carpe Noctem", a song by Jim Steinman for the 1997 musical Dance of the Vampires
- Carpe Noctem, a fictional gothic nightclub in the eleventh episode of the first season of the television series Lost Girl
- Carpe Noctem, a 2020 album by Big Ghost

== See also ==
- Carpe Noctum, a 2017 album by Armored Saint
- Carpe diem (disambiguation)
- Seize the Night (disambiguation)
