= To Be or Not to Be (album) =

Studio album by Nightmare
- Released: March 19, 2014
- Genres: Alternative rock; heavy metal; gothic rock
- Length: 53:15
- Label: Avex, HPQ
- Producer: Nightmare

Nightmare chronology
| Scums (2013) | To Be or Not to Be (2014) | Carpe Diem (2015) |

To Be or Not to Be is Nightmare's ninth full-length studio album. As all of their recent album releases, it came in three different versions, each with different artwork. The two limited editions (Types A & B), each come with different DVD tracks while the standard edition (Type C) came with one extra song. The album peaked #11 in the Oricon charts.

== Track listing ==
Regular Edition (Type C)
| No. | Title | Length |
|---|---|---|
| 1. | "Gallows" | 4:45 |
| 2. | "TO BE OR NOT TO BE" | 2:29 |
| 3. | "Dizzy" | 3:50 |
| 4. | "tokyo-to rasetsu-ku (東京都羅刹区)" | 4:14 |
| 5. | "rewrite (リライト)" | 3:53 |
| 6. | "Melt into blue sky." | 5:06 |
| 7. | "-TRUTH-" | 3:44 |
| 8. | "Lulla[by≠bye]" | 6:00 |
| 9. | "TERMINAL" | 4:23 |
| 10. | "Drastica (ドラスティカ)" | 3:59 |
| 11. | "gokujou noushin rengoku isshiki (極上脳震煉獄・弌式)" | 4:35 |
| 12. | "L.L.B" | 4:01 |
| 13. | "Kenka Drive - instrumental- (Note: Track only included on Type C album)" | 4:11 |
| Total length: | | 53:15 |

=== Limited Edition A ===
Type A Bonus DVD Track
| No. | Title | Length |
|---|---|---|
| 13. | "Gallows PV + Making" |

=== Limited Edition B ===
Type B Bonus DVD Track
| No. | Title | Length |
|---|---|---|
| 13. | "Drastica (ドラスティカ) PV + Making" |

== Single information ==
- Rewrite (リライト)

Released: January 8, 2014
Oricon Chart peak position: #2

- Dizzy

Released: August 21, 2013
Oricon Chart peak position: #13
