= The Summer of the Ubume =

1994 novel by Natsuhiko Kyogoku

- First edition (Japanese)
- Author: Natsuhiko Kyogoku
- Original title: Ubume no Natsu
- Translator: Alexander O. Smith with Elye J. Alexander
- Language: Japanese
- Series: Kyōgokudō
- Genre: Novel
- Publisher: Kodansha
- Publication date: 1994
- Publication place: Japan
- English publication date: 2009
- Media type: Print (Paperback)
- Pages: 320 pp
- ISBN: 978-1-934287-25-5
- Followed by: Mōryō no Hako

The Summer of the Ubume (姑獲鳥の夏, Ubume no Natsu) is a Japanese novel by Natsuhiko Kyogoku. It is Kyogoku’s first novel, and the first entry in his Kyōgōkudō series about atheist onmyōji Akihiko "Kyōgokudō" Chūzenji. It has been turned into a live-action feature film.

== Story ==
The Summer of the Ubume is told from the perspective of freelance writer Tatsumi Sekiguchi, who is investigating rumors of a woman at the Kuonji Clinic who has remained pregnant for twenty months after the disappearance of her husband. He seeks advice and help from his close friend Akihiko Chuzenji, whom Sekiguchi refers to by the name of his bookstore ("Kyōgokudō"). Sekiguchi is further drawn to the case when he meets the pregnant woman's beautiful sister, Ryoko Kuonji, and she asks for his help in solving her brother-in-law's disappearance from a locked, sealed room. With the help of his friends - Kyōgokudō, private eye Reijiro Enokizu, police detective Shujiro Kiba, and fellow reporter Atsuko Chuzenji (Kyōgokudō's sister) - Sekiguchi attempts to discover the disappearing husband's fate, but he soon learns that there is much more to the Kuonji Clinic than meets the eye, and that his own involvement with Makio Kuonji's disappearance may run deeper than he thinks. Only Kyōgokudō's knowledge of Japanese folklore - and specifically the legend of the ubume, often associated with death in childbirth - can make sense of the conflicting evidence, and Kyōgokudō agrees to perform an exorcism that will solve the mystery once and for all.

== Publication ==
The novel was first published in 1994 by Kodansha. In 2009, an English-language edition was published by Vertical.

== Film adaptation ==
The novel was adapted into a live-action feature film in 2005.

== Manga adaptation ==
The novel was adapted into a manga of the same name by Natsuhiko Kyougoku and Aki Shimizu in 2013.

== See also ==
- Tozai Mystery Best 100 (The Top 100 Mystery Novels of the East and the West)
- Mōryō no Hako, the second novel in the Kyōgokudō novel series
