= Majestical Parade =

Studio album by Nightmare
- Released: May 13, 2009
- Genre: Progressive rock; alternative rock
- Length: 49:27
- Label: VAP
- Producer: Nightmare

Nightmare chronology
Killer Show (2008)	Majestical Parade (2009)	Gianizm (2010)

Majestical Parade is Nightmare's sixth full-length studio album. Three different versions of this album were released: one with just the CD; one with a CD+DVD; and one with a CD+DVD and a photo book. The sixth song, MELODY, was released as a limited single download on the DWANGO homepage. The album reached #3 in the Oricon Charts.

== Track listing ==
No.	Title	Length
1.	"Parade"	3:04
2.	"Can you do it?"	4:31
3.	"Mr. Trash music"	2:56
4.	"NAKED LOVE"	4:07
5.	"MASQUERADE"	4:42
6.	"MELODY"	4:34
7.	"Cynical Re:actor"	4:08
8.	"Gianism Kyuu (ジャイアニズム究)"	2:38
9.	"Nothing you lose"	4:33
10.	"Lost in Blue"	4:16
11.	"Simple Life (シンプライフ)"	5:04
12.	"Chronicle (クロニクル)"	4:57
Total length:		49:27

== Single information ==
- Lost in Blue

Released: September 17, 2008
Peak chart position: #4

- NAKED LOVE

Released: December 3, 2008
Peak chart position: #5

- MELODY

Released: April 29, 2009
Internet only release, did not chart.

"Lost in Blue" and "NAKED LOVE" were used as the opening and ending theme to "Moryo no Hako" respectively.

== Musicians ==
- Tomiyasu Tohru - Drums Tuner
- Tooru Yoshida - Keyboards
- Sasaki Shiro - Arrangement Horn, Trumpet
- Kazuki Katsuta - Tenor Sax
- KAWAI Wakaba - Trombone
- Miwa Gardner - Female Vocals
- Shinobu - Manipulator
- Takayuki Kurihara - Manipulator
