= Seize the Night =

"Seize the night" is a traditional translation of the Latin phrase carpe noctem ("enjoy the night", literally "pluck (or harvest) the night").

Seize the Noctem may also refer to:

- Seize the Night (novel), a 1998 novel by Dean Koontz
- "Seize the Night", a song by Meat Loaf from the 2006 album Bat Out of Hell III: The Monster Is Loose
  - The Seize the Night Tour, a 2007 concert tour by Meat Loaf to promote the album
- Seize the Night, a 2015 anthology edited by Christopher Golden

== See also ==
- Carpe noctem (disambiguation)
- Seize the Day (disambiguation)
