= Gianism Best Ofs =

ジャイアニズム

Compilation album by Nightmare
- Released: April 21, 2003 - June 21, 2006
- Genres: Alternative rock; hard rock; gothic rock
- Label: Nippon Crown/VAP
- Producer: Nightmare

Nightmare chronology
anima (2006)	ジャイアニズム (2003)	The WORLD Ruler (2007)

Gianism Best Ofs consists of four best of albums released by Nightmare. The tracks on Gianism ~omae no mono wa ore no mono (ジャイアニズム ～お前の物は俺の物～) and Gianism ~Ore no mono wa ore no mono (ジャイアニズム〜俺の物は俺の物〜) are songs from the band's 'indies' era; they performed these songs during their earlier tours. These two albums were also released as a limited edition double album. The album Gianism ~Nightmare no Kuse ni Namaikidazo~, consists of their best of songs after they went major.

== Track listing ==
Gianism ~Nightmare no Kuse ni Namaikidazo~ the best of NIGHTMARE (ジャイアニズム〜ナイトメアのくせに生意気だぞ〜 the best of NIGHTMARE)
No.	Title	Length
1.	"Believe"	03:03
2.	"Akane (茜)"	03:57
3.	"HATE"	03:43
4.	"Over"	04:07
5.	"M-aria"	04:13
6.	"Mind Ocean"	06:03
7.	"Kyokuto Ranshin Tengoku (極東乱心天国)"	04:07
8.	"Varuna"	04:11
9.	"Flora"
10.	"Tokyo Shounen (東京傷年)"	04:22
11.	"Traumerei (トロイメライ)"
12.	"Cyan (シアン, Shian)"	03:36
13.	"Tsuki no Hikari, Utsutsu no Yume (月の光、うつつの夢)"	04:56
14.	"Travel (トラヴェル)"	03:52
15.	"Jibun no Hana (時分の花)"	04:10
16.	"Dasei Boogie (惰性ブギー)"
17.	"Яaven Loud speeeaker"	04:28
18.	"livEVIL"	04:03

Gianism ~Omae no mono wa ore no mono~ (ジャイアニズム〜お前の物は俺の物〜)
No.	Title	Length
1.	"Jishou (Shounen Terrorist) (自傷（少年テロリスト）)"
2.	"Backstreet Children (バックストリートチルドレン)"
3.	"Nadirecar"
4.	"Tsubasa wo Kudasai (翼をください)"
5.	"Crash! Nightmare Channel (クラッシュ！ナイトメアチャンネル)"
6.	"Gianism San (ジャイアニズム惨)"
7.	"Shinjitsu no Hana (真実の花)"
8.	"M-aria"
9.	"star[K]night"
10.	"Wasurena Kusa (わすれな草)"
11.	"Kadan (華談)"

Gianism ~Ore no mono wa ore no mono~ (ジャイアニズム〜俺の物は俺の物〜)
No.	Title	Length
1.	"Dogma"
2.	"Bildungsroman (ビルドゥングス・ロマン)"
3.	"Wasurenagusa~k no souretsu~ (勿忘草 ～Kの葬列～)"
4.	"Saiyuki (最遊期)"
5.	"Esaragoto (絵空事)"
6.	"Gianism~tsuu minagoroshi~ (ジャイアニズム痛 ～生涯皆殺し～)"
7.	"Hoshi ni negai wo (星に願いを)"
8.	"Shunkashuuto (春夏秋冬)"
9.	"Fly Me to the Zenith"
10.	"Kimi to ita kisetsu (君といた季節)"
11.	"Love Tripper"

== Chart positions ==
Release date	Album	Oricon peak
2003.04.21	Gianism ~omae no mono wa ore no mono (ジャイアニズム ～お前の物は俺の物～)	83
2003.05.21	Gianism ~ore no mono wa ore no mono (ジャイアニズム〜俺の物は俺の物〜)	57
2006.05.10	Gianism ~Nightmare no Kuse ni Namaikidazo~ the best of NIGHTMARE (ジャイアニズム〜ナイトメアのくせに生意気だぞ〜 the best of NIGHTMARE)	19
2006.06.21	Gianism ~omae no mono wa ore no mono~ ~Ore no mono wa ore no mono~ (ジャイアニズム ～お前の物は俺の物～ ～俺の物は俺の物～)	27
