= Seize the Day Inc. =

- Company type: Private
- Industry: Motivational speaking
- Founded: 2010
- Defunct: 2011
- Fate: Unknown
- Headquarters: Winchester, Nevada, U.S.
- Products: Seize the Day seminar
- Services: Self-help, self-improvement, personal development, management consulting, continuing education
- Website: seizetheday.com

Seize the Day was an American conservative motivational seminar company located in Winchester, Nevada.

Motivational speakers included Laura Bush, Bill O'Reilly, Terry Bradshaw, Ben Stein, Phil Town, and others. The seminars were held in major arenas in larger U.S. cities, and the events were titled "Seize the Day + city name" (e.g. "Seize the Day Columbus").

The 2010 unique edition of the event was organized almost at the same time as the very similar event Get Motivated.
