= Scums (album) =

SCUMS

Studio album by Nightmare
- Released: January 30, 2013
- Genres: Alternative rock; progressive rock
- Length: 56:46
- Label: Avex, HPQ

Nightmare chronology
Nightmare (2011)	SCUMS (2013)	To Be or Not to Be (2014)

SCUMS is the eighth studio album from the Japanese band Nightmare. Like all the band's recent releases, this album was released in three different editions, each with different artwork. The 2 limited edition albums (Type A & B) each contain a different bonus DVD track and the standard (Type C) contains two extra tracks. The album peaked at #8 in the Oricon charts.

== Track listing ==
Regular Edition (Type C)
No.	Title	Length
1.	"My Name is SCUM"	1:36
2.	"ASSaulter"	3:43
3.	"mimic"	3:48
4.	"riddle"	3:47
5.	"ame to yoru ni ochite (雨と夜に墜ちて)"	5:43
6.	"DISSEMBLE"	3:30
7.	"ERRORs"	3:40
8.	"owaru sekai no hajimari wa kinari (終わる世界の始まりは奇なり)"	4:22
9.	"-Droid-"	4:31
10.	"404 (Renamed to "Yonmaruyon" for Itunes)"	4:34
11.	"I'm Not"	5:11
12.	"Deus ex machina"	4:24
13.	"BLACK OUT (Note: Track only included on Type C album)"	3:55
14.	"BEHIND THE MASK "	4:02
Total length:		56:46

=== Limited Edition A ===
Type A Bonus DVD Track
No.	Title	Length
13.	"ASSaulter PV"

=== Limited Edition B ===
Type B Bonus DVD Track
No.	Title	Length
13.	"owaru sekai no hajimari wa kinari (終わる世界の始まりは奇なり) PV"

== Single information ==
- Mimic

Released: February 29, 2012
Oricon Chart peak position: #9

- Deus ex Machina

Released: November 28, 2012
Oricon Chart peak position: #11
