= Killer Show =

Studio album by Nightmare
- Released: May 21, 2008
- Genre: Progressive rock; alternative rock
- Label: VAP
- Producer: Nightmare

Nightmare chronology
極東シンフォニー〜the Five Stars Night〜@BUDOKAN (2008)	Killer Show (2008)	Majestical Parade (2009)

Killer Show is Nightmare's fifth studio album. It was released May 21, 2008 in three different versions: one with just a CD; one with a CD+DVD; and a limited edition with a CD+DVD and a photo book. The album peaked at #5 in the Oricon Charts. The eleventh song, White Room, was released as a limited single download on their homepage.

== Track listing ==
No.	Title	Length
1.	"Pandora (パンドラ)"
2.	"Dirty"
3.	"the Last Show"
4.	"TrickStar"
5.	"Mebius no Yūtsu (メビウスの憂鬱)"
6.	"Konoha (このは)"
7.	"Raison d'être (レゾンデートル)"
8.	"Worst"
9.	"Gianism Hachi (ジャイアニズム罰)"
10.	"General (ジェネラル)"
11.	"White Room"
12.	"Cloudy dayz"
13.	"Yasō Kyoku (夜想曲)"

== Single information ==
- Raison d'etre (レゾンデートル)

Released: June 6, 2007
Peak chart position: #3
Used as the opening theme for the anime Claymore.

- Konoha (このは)

Released: October 3, 2007
Peak chart position: #4

- DIRTY

Released: November 7, 2007
Peak chart position: #8
Used as the opening theme for the anime Majin Tantei Nōgami Neuro.
