= Kyokuto Symphony: The Five Stars Night @Budokan =

極東シンフォニー〜the Five Stars Night〜@BUDOKAN

Live album by Nightmare
- Released: March 12, 2008
- Genre: Alternative metal, gothic rock, nu metal
- Label: VAP
- Producer: Nightmare

Nightmare chronology
Nightmare 2003–2005 Single Collection (2006)	極東シンフォニー〜the Five Stars Night〜@BUDOKAN (2008)	Killer Show (2008)

Kyotoku Symphony ~the Five Stars Night~@ Budokan (極東シンフォニー〜the Five Stars Night〜@BUDOKAN) is Nightmare's first live album. This was their first performance at Nippon Budokan on September 23, 2007. It reached #11 in the Oricon charts.

== Track listing ==
CD track list
No.	Title	Length
1.	"dogma"
2.	"theWORLD"
3.	"Varuna"
4.	"Gianism Roku (ジャイアニズム碌)"
5.	"Konoha (このは)"
6.	"Wasurena Kusa (わすれな草)"
7.	"cloudy dayz"
8.	"Criminal baby"
9.	"Gianism Shichi (ジャイアニズム叱)"
10.	"Raison d'être (レゾンデートル)"
11.	"Kyotoku Rashin Tengoku (極東乱心天国)"
12.	"Jojōteki ni Sugita Jikan to Fukakutei na Mirai e no Requiem (叙情的に過ぎた時間と不確定な未来へのレクイエム)"
13.	"Star[K]night"

DVD track list
No.	Title	Length
1.	"dogma"
2.	"theWORLD"
3.	"Gianism Tsuu ~Minagoroshi~ (ジャイアニズム痛～生涯皆殺し～)"
4.	"Varuna"
5.	"Tokyo Shounen (東京傷年)"
6.	"Nadirecar"
7.	"Gianism Roku (ジャイアニズム碌)"
8.	"Konoha (このは)"
9.	"Wasurena Kusa (わすれな草)"
10.	"Cyan (シアン)"
11.	"cloudy dayz"
12.	"Criminal baby"
13.	"HATE"
14.	"Gianism Shichi (ジャイアニズム叱)"
15.	"Raison d'être (レゾンデートル)"
16.	"Яaven Loud Speeeaker"
17.	"Dasei Boogie (惰性ブギー)"
18.	"Gianism San (ジャイアニズム惨)"
19.	"Kyotoku Rashin Tengoku (極東乱心天国)"
20.	"-Believe-"
21.	"Nadzuki (ナヅキ)"
22.	"Jojōteki ni Sugita Jikan to Fukakutei na Mirai e no Requiem (叙情的に過ぎた時間と不確定な未来へのレクイエム)"
23.	"Crash!? Nightmare Channel (クラッシュ！？ナイトメアチャンネル)"
24.	"Jishou (自傷)"
25.	"Rakuu (落羽)"
26.	"Star[K]night"
27.	"-Believe- (en-1)"
28.	"najiki (ナヅキ) (en-2)"
29.	"Jojōteki ni Sugita Jikan to Fukakutei na Mirai e no Requiem (叙情的に過ぎた時間と不確定な未来へのレクイエム)(en-3)"
30.	"Crash!? Nightmare Channel (クラッシュ！？ナイトメアチャンネル) (en-4)"
31.	"Jishou(Shounen Terrorist) (自傷（少年テロリスト）) (en-5)"
32.	"Rakuu (落羽) (en-6)"
33.	"Star[K]night (en-7)"
