= Nightmare 2003–2005 Single Collection =

Nightmare 2003−2005 Single Collection

Compilation album by Nightmare
- Released: January 30, 2008
- Genres: Alternative metal, alternative rock, glam metal, nu metal
- Label: Nippon Crown
- Producer: Nightmare

Nightmare chronology
the WORLD Ruler (2006)	Nightmare 2003−2005 Single Collection (2008)	Kyokuto Symphony: The Five Stars Night @Budokan (2008)

Nightmare 2003–2005 is Nightmare's re-release of their earlier works under Nippon Crown. This collection includes a DVD with their past promotional videos.

== Track listing ==
CD
No.	Title	Length
1.	"Believe"	03:03
2.	"Akane (茜)"	03:57
3.	"HATE"
4.	"Over"	04:07
5.	"Varuna"
6.	"Tokyo Shounen (東京傷年)"
7.	"Cyan (シアン, Shian)"
8.	"Jibun no Hana (時分の花)"	04:10
9.	"Яaven Loud speeeaker"
10.	"livEVIL"
11.	"13th"
12.	"muzzle, muzzle, muzzle"
13.	"to for"
14.	"Flora"
15.	"Gianism Go (ジャイアニズム誤)"
16.	"Traumerei (トロイメライ)"
17.	"Tsuki no Hikari, Utsutsu no Yume (月の光、うつつの夢)"
18.	"Dasei Boogey (惰性ブギー)"
19.	"Nadzuki (ナヅキ)"
20.	"MARY (メアリー)"

DVD - Single PVs
No.	Title	Length
1.	"Believe"	03:03
2.	"Akane (茜)"	03:57
3.	"HATE"
4.	"Over"	04:07
5.	"Varuna"
6.	"Tokyo Shounen (東京傷年)"
7.	"Cyan (シアン, Shian)"
8.	"Jibun no Hana (時分ノ花)"
9.	"Яaven Loud speeeaker"
10.	"livEVIL"
