= Livid (Nightmare album) =

Studio album by Nightmare
- Released: November 25, 2004
- Genre: Alternative rock; hard rock
- Length: 49:12
- Label: Nippon Crown
- Producer: Nightmare

Nightmare chronology
Ultimate Circus (2003)	Livid (2004)	Anima (2006)

Livid (リヴィド, Rivido) is Nightmare's second full-length studio album. It peaked at #29 in the Oricon Charts. In this album, they introduced a small preview of the new sound of Nightmare by adding an extra part for an acoustic guitar in two songs, Travel and Shian/Cyan, and a twist of jazz fusion in Underdog. Due to the spelling and pronunciation of 'livid' in Japanese (ribido) the album has sometimes been incorrectly referred to as Libido.

== Track listing ==
No.	Title	Length
1.	"Sanagi (蛹, Pupa)"	01:29
2.	"Varuna"	04:11
3.	"Sekishoku (赤触, Red Feel)"	03:20
4.	"Underdog"	03:10
5.	"Tokyo Shounen (東京傷年, Tokyo Boys)"	04:22
6.	"Suna (砂, Sand)"	06:42
7.	"Tsuki no hikari, utsutsu no yume (月の光、うつつの夢, Moonlight, a Dream of Reality)"	04:56
8.	"be buried"	03:28
9.	"Gianism Go (ジャイアニズム誤, Mistake)"	02:21
10.	"Shian (シアン, Cyan)"	03:36
11.	"Remembrance"	04:32
12.	"Itsuka no boku he (いつかの僕へ, To Me Sometime)"	03:13
13.	"Travel (トラヴェル, Torabiru)"	03:52
Total length:		49:12

== Single information ==
- Varuna

Release Date: April 21, 2004
Oricon Chart Peak Position: #29

- Tokyo Shounen (東京傷年)

Release Date: July 22, 2004
Oricon Chart Peak Position: #21

- Cyan (シアン, Shian)

Release Date: October 21, 2004
Oricon Chart Peak Position: #22
