= The World Ruler =

the WORLD Ruler

Studio album by Nightmare
- Released: February 27, 2007
- Genre: Alternative rock; gothic rock; hard rock
- Length: 51:27
- Label: VAP
- Producer: Nightmare

Nightmare chronology
| Gianism Best Ofs (2006) | the WORLD Ruler (2007) | Nightmare 2003-2005 Single Collection (2008) |

the WORLD Ruler is Nightmare's fourth full-length studio album. Nightmare's experimentation with the styles of electronica, ambience, and usage of live brass began in this album. Three different versions of this album were released: a CD-only version; a CD+DVD version; and a bonus CD, DVD and photobook pack. It peaked at #6 in the Oricon Charts. The tracks "The World" and "Alumina" were featured in Death Note as the first opening and ending songs, respectively.

== Track listing ==
| No. | Title | Length |
|---|---|---|
| 1. | "BOYS, BE SUSPICIOUS" | 4:03 |
| 2. | "PHANTOM" | 1:33 |
| 3. | "the WORLD" | 3:48 |
| 4. | "Criminal Baby" | 3:34 |
| 5. | "Alice" | 4:15 |
| 6. | "crevasse" | 4:55 |
| 7. | "18Sai (18歳)" | 3:28 |
| 8. | "Black Sick Spider" | 3:32 |
| 9. | "Gianizm Shichi (ジャイアニズム叱)" | 5:06 |
| 10. | "The FOOL" | 0:47 |
| 11. | "Alumina (アルミナ)" | 5:05 |
| 12. | "Morpho" | 5:51 |
| 13. | "～Lulu～ (縷々)" | 5:29 |
| Total length: | | 51:27 |

== Single information ==
- theWORLD/Alumina (アルミナ)

Released: October 18, 2006
Oricon Chart peak position: #5
"The WORLD" and "Alumina" were used as the first opening and ending theme, respectively, for the anime Death Note.

== Covers ==
"the WORLD" was covered by Fantôme Iris, a fictional visual kei band from multimedia franchise Argonavis from BanG Dream! and added in the game started on January 14, 2021. The full version of the song will be featured on Argonavis Cover Collection -Mix- which will be released on November 17, 2021.
