= The Carpe Diem Trust =

The Carpe Diem Trust is a UK-based charitable trust. It was registered on 4 July 2006 with the UK Charity Commission, with the registered number 1115061.

According to the Trust's website its purpose is:

The Carpe Diem Trust is a new charity, due to begin operation in the second half of 2007. It will be a grant awarding body aimed at helping and motivating ordinary people to take control of their lives and to stretch the boundaries of their potential further than they thought possible.
