= Historical ~The Highest Nightmare~ =

Compilation album by Nightmare
- Released: October 20, 2010
- Genre: Rock
- Label: Avex, HPQ

Nightmare chronology
Gianizm (2010)	Historical ~The Highest Nightmare~ (2010)	Nightmare (2011)

Historical ~The Highest Nightmare~ is one of the 10th anniversary albums from Nightmare. The 2-disc album contains 12 re-recorded tracks (from before the band's move to VAP), 11 previously released songs and 1 new track. The album peaked at #14 in the Oricon charts.

== Track listing ==
Disc One (Re-recorded Tracks)
No.	Title	Length
1.	"~Believe~"
2.	"Over"
3.	"HATE"
4.	"Akane (茜)"
5.	"Varuna"
6.	"Tokyo Shounen (東京傷年)"
7.	"Cyan (シアン)"
8.	"Jibun no Hana (時分ノ花)"
9.	"Яaven Loud speeeaker"
10.	"livEVIL"
11.	"Fly me to the Zenith"
12.	"Kyokutou Ranshin Tengoku (極東乱心天国)"

Disc Two
No.	Title	Length
1.	"the WORLD"
2.	"Alumina (アルミナ)"
3.	"Raison D'etre (レゾンデートル)"
4.	"Konoha (このは)"
5.	"DIRTY"
6.	"White Room"
7.	"MELODY"
8.	"Lost in Blue"
9.	"NAKED LOVE"
10.	"the LAST SHOW"
11.	"Can you do it?"
12.	"D Line of Tragedy (D 線上のトラジェディ（未発表新曲）)"
