= Nightmare (Nightmare album) =

NIGHTMARE

Studio album by Nightmare
- Released: November 23, 2011
- Genres: Alternative rock; hard rock
- Label: Avex, HPQ

Nightmare chronology
Historical ~The Highest Nightmare~ (2010)	NIGHTMARE (2011)	SCUMS (2013)

Nightmare is the seventh studio album from the Japanese band Nightmare. Like all the band's recent releases, this album was released in three different editions, each with different artwork. The 2 limited edition albums contain bonus DVD tracks, while the regular edition includes a bonus track titled "Dazzle". The album peaked at #10 in the Oricon charts and sold 16,971 copies in the first week.

== Track listing ==
Regular Edition
No.	Title	Length
1.	"eleven"	02:28
2.	"VERMILION."	04:17
3.	"Fragment"	04:33
4.	"Swallowtail"	04:40
5.	"Q."	03:50
6.	"RAY OF LIGHT"	03:50
7.	"Rem_ -reprint ver.-"	04:26
8.	"Cherish"	02:42
9.	"The sorrow of deceiver"	04:17
10.	"a:FANTASIA -reprint ver.-"	03:44
11.	"Zero -beyond the G.- (零-beyond the G.-, Rei - beyond the G.)"	03:10
12.	"Rinne (輪廻)"	05:20
13.	"$eam"	03:56
14.	"SLEEPER"	03:55
15.	"Dazzle (Note: This track is only included on the regular edition.)"	03:39

=== Limited Edition A ===
Bonus DVD Track
No.	Title	Length
1.	"Swallowtail PV"

=== Limited Edition B ===
Bonus DVD Track
No.	Title	Length
1.	"Ray of Light PV"

== Single information ==
- Rem_

Released: September 22, 2009
Oricon Chart Peak Position: #3
First Week Sales: 18,967

- A:Fantasia

Released: June 23, 2010
Oricon Chart Peak Position: #5
First Week Sales: 16,568

- Vermilion

Released: May 18, 2011
Oricon Chart Peak Position: #6
First Week Sales: 19,242

- Sleeper

Released: September 7, 2011
Oricon Chart Peak Position: #7
