= Nightmare (Japanese band) =

Japanese visual kei rock band

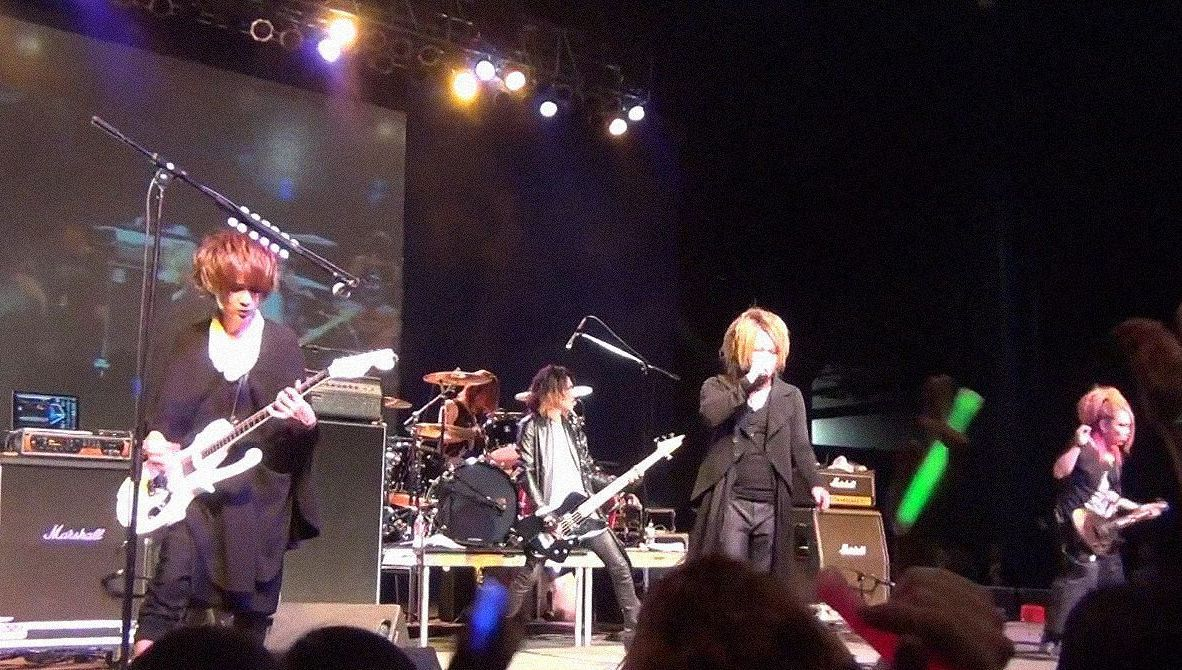
- Nightmare performing in 2014

Background information
- Origin: Sendai, Tōhoku, Japan
- Genres: Alternative rock; gothic rock; progressive rock; hard rock; heavy metal
- Works: Nightmare discography
- Years active: 2000–2016, 2020–present
- Labels: Speed Disk/XXX Records; Nippon Crown; VAP; HPQ; littleHEARTS.Music
- Members: Yomi; Sakito (咲人); Hitsugi (柩); Ni~ya; Ruka
- Past members: Zannin
- Website: nightmare-web.com

Nightmare (ナイトメア, Naitomea) is a Japanese visual kei rock band formed in Sendai, Tōhoku, in 2000. It has consisted of Yomi (lead vocals), Sakito (lead guitar, backing vocals), Hitsugi (rhythm guitar), Ni~ya (bass, backing vocals) and Ruka (drums, percussion) for the majority of their existence. They experienced mainstream success with the inclusion of their songs "The World" and "Alumina" in the Death Note anime and are considered a major act in the visual kei scene.

== History ==
=== Founding and Ultimate Circus (2000–2003) ===
Nightmare formed on January 1, 2000 by Sakito and Hitsugi while most of the members were still in high school. The band name was suggested by Hitsugi, saying he wanted a band name that would scare people to match their visual styles. Soon, Ni~ya was invited by Sakito, Yomi by Hitsugi, and Zannin joined after he heard his classmates were forming a band. They were all influenced by either X Japan or Luna Sea, therefore they started out as a cover band, before they began to write their own material.

Just as the band began getting more recognition at live houses and small concerts in the Sendai region, Zannin left the band for unknown reasons. Eventually, Ruka (formerly of Luinspear) joined the band as a support member at first, but became the permanent drummer after a short time. Since Ruka joined Nightmare officially, their line-up hasn't changed. Shortly after, the band began short tours around the region with other supporting bands.

In 2003, Nightmare signed with Nippon Crown and released their first single "Believe". Three months after their debut, they released a triple A-side single, "Akane/Hate/Over", a first time for any band to release any single with three A-side tracks. Nightmare's song "Over" was used as the ending theme for the anime television series Croket!. Later that year, they released their first studio album, Ultimate Circus and went on their first tour.

=== Livid and Anima (2004–2006) ===
In 2004 Nightmare released three singles; "Varuna", "Tokyo Shounen", and "Cyan", as well as another full album, Livid. Nightmare once more toured around Japan under the name Tour CPU 2004. From 2005 to 2006, Nightmare continued working, releasing more singles and their third full-length album in 2006, Anima, for which the support tour, [Anima]lism, completely sold out. In 2006 they recorded a live record at NHK Hall titled Gianism Tsu. With three albums and several tours under their belt, Nightmare released a series of "greatest hits" albums.

=== The World Ruler and Killer Show (2007–2008) ===
In October 2006, Nightmare released "The World/Alumina", the first single to be released under their new label, VAP. These two songs were used as the first opening and ending themes respectively of the first nineteen episodes of the Death Note anime adaptation. On 27 February 2007, they released their fourth album, "The World Ruler" and toured for three months around Japan. They released their next single, "Raison d'Etre", barely a month after finishing their tour (which was used as the opening theme song for the anime Claymore). In June 2007, they had a three-day concert event titled"The World Ruler Encore.

On September 23, 2007, they performed at Nippon Budokan for the first time. The concert was called Kyokuto Symphony ~The Five Stars Night~ and tickets were all sold out within two weeks. They released two more singles, "Konoha" on October 3, 2007 and "Dirty", (which was the opening theme of Majin Tantei Nougami Neuro) released on November 7. They ended 2007 with the Dirty Influence Tour in selected cities in Japan in December.

2008 began with the release of two more albums. The first, Nightmare 2003-2005 Single Collection, was released under their old label, Nippon Crown and was the latest installment of their greatest hits. The second, Kyokuto Symphony ~The Five Stars Night~ @Budokan, was their first live album, recorded during their tour the previous year. In March, they toured with their 2008 Zepp Tour Six Point Killer Show and released a single titled "White Room". White Room was available only as a limited internet download. On May 21, 2008, they released their fifth original studio album titled "Killer Show", their third album release that year. Following the release, they toured Japan. Another single, "Lost in Blue" was released on September 17. It was used as the opening theme song to the anime adaptation of Mōryō no Hako and another of their songs, "Naked Love", was used as the end theme. This was also released as a single on December 3.

=== Majestical Parade and 10th anniversary (2009–2010) ===
Nightmare started 2009 with a short two-day tour titled "the 9th new departure" and announced the release of their album Majestical Parade. One of the songs from the album, "Melody", was available for a limited internet download on April 29, 2009 through Dwango. Majestical Parade was released in Japan on May 13, 2009 and the band performed the Nightmare Live House Tour 2009 Parade of Nine, a nine-stop tour ending with a show in Toyama on May 31, 2009. During this time, Nightmare collaborated with the internet video company Nico Nico in streaming a live concert on May 17 via Nico Nico Live. The concert lasted for 19 minutes and 34 seconds. Their next tour, titled Nightmare Tour 2009 Parade ~ Start of [X]pest Eve~ began in June. The summer tour was topped off by the band's second appearance at Nippon Budokan on August 29, 2009, in the "Parade Tour Finale "Majestic"". They released their 20th single, "Rem", on September 22, with the B-side track "Love Addict". To finish up 2009, they did a six-show, fan club only live house tour in December.

2010 marked the band's 10th anniversary. To celebrate, Nightmare held a New Year's Eve Countdown show at Zepp Sendai and released Gianizm the next day. This was followed by their first performance at Saitama Super Arena on January 9. The show was called Nightmare 10th Anniversary Special Act. Vol.1 [Gianizm] and the set list contained 27 songs, including all of the songs on the new album. The promotional tour Request of Gianizm the Tour began in April and on June 23, they released their 21st single, A:Fantasia. As part of their celebrations, they toured several times. In July, they began the Nightmare 10th Anniversary Special Act. Vol.2: Re:Start of Tell(All)ism tour, beginning in Saitama and ending in Sendai. The final show of the tour was held at Nippon Budokan, marking their third time at the prestigious venue. In between Vol. 2 and Vol. 3 of the tour, they released another best-of album titled Historical ~The Highest Nightmare~, with several re-recorded tracks and one new song. The last part of the tour was titled Nightmare 10th Anniversary Special Act. Vol.3 Historical ~The Highest Nightmare~. They performed at Makuhari Messe for the first time on December 25.

=== Nightmare and Scums (2011–2016) ===
After a countdown clock appeared on their website, Nightmare announced an unexpected live called Publish! at Shinkiba Studio Coast. However, because of the Sendai earthquake and tsunami on March 11, the show was postponed until March 30 and renamed Publish & Recover!. They also announced a new single would be released on May 18, titled "Vermilion" under Avex Entertainment. They started their Time Rewind to Zero tour on April 15, 2011. Their last show of the tour was on June 27 at Tokyo Kokusai Forum Hall A. On August 1, Nightmare played with Kishidan in a Battle of the Bands show to celebrate Kishidan's 10th anniversary. "Sleeper" was released as a single on September 7, as a collaboration with luxury jewellery brand GemCerey. Following the release of the single was a new tour called Zeppelin, where the band toured through Zepp live houses nationwide in Japan. For Halloween, Hitsugi participated in Hyde's Halloween Junky Orchestra along with several other musicians to produce the song "Halloween Party" and an untitled instrumental track. The single was released October 17, 2012 and followed by a short tour at Kobe World Memorial Hall.

Their self-titled album Nightmare was released on November 23, 2011, following which, they began a three-month tour titled Nightmare Tour 2011–2012 Nightmarish Reality. After the tour, they released "Mimic" on February 29, 2012. In July and August 2012, Nightmare participated in a two-man tour with visual kei band Baroque in Natural Born Errors: Nightmare vs. Baroque. They also participated in Little.Hearts 4-year Anniversary show, My Little Hearts. Special Edition Vol.4 with several other visual kei bands. Their 24th single "Deus ex Machina" was released on November 28, 2012.

On January 30, 2013, the band released a new album titled Scums. The album contained the singles "Mimic" and "Deus ex Machina" alongside 12 other songs. Following the release, they began a 19-show nationwide tour from February 10 titled Beautiful Scums. The tour ended on April 20, 2013 at Hibiya Kokaido theatre. Nightmare also had their first overseas show at Anime Expo 2013 in Paris, France. They performed alongside May'n, Una, and Urbangarde July 6 and had their solo show on July 7 along with a signing session. Their first overseas debut ended successfully. Their next single "Dizzy", released on August 21, 2013, marks their 10th anniversary since becoming a major label band. Alongside the single release, the band will also release a DVD and Blu-ray of their Beautiful Scums final at Nakano Sun Plaza with a tour documentary.

The band abruptly announced an end-of-year hiatus on April 3, 2016, due to Yomi's functional dysphonia.

=== Return from hiatus and NOX:LUX (2020-present) ===
After a 4 year hiatus, the band officially resumed activities on February 11, 2020, with its "20th Anniversary SPECIAL LIVE GIANIZM ~Sai Aku~" at Yokohama Arena. Their first solo overseas performance in Taiwan was scheduled for March 29, 2020, but was cancelled due to the COVID-19 pandemic.

On October 7, 2020, they released their first single in 4 years, titled "ink".

On March 3, 2021, they released their 2° Single after the hiatus, Cry for the moon, and shortly thereafter went on tour, NIGHTMARE TOUR 2021, Cry for the moon

On November 17, 2021, they released another Single that same year, Sinners, which was used as the second opening theme for the anime Duel Masters King!

== Musical style and influences ==
Nightmare's band concept is Gianizm and this word occurs in many of their song titles. Gianizm is derived from the Doraemon character Gian. Gian's motto is "What's yours is mine, what's mine is mine." ("Omae no mono wa ore no mono. Ore no mono wa ore no mono."). Incidentally, this also forms the name of the two 'best of' albums on which Nightmare re-released their indie songs. The band has often ventured into new genres or styles, such as on their 2013 album "Scums" where they experiment with electronica and dubstep or "Masquerade" and "Konoha" where they experiment with ska and reggae also in their album To Be or Not to Be they experimented with elements from metalcore like breakdowns.

X Japan's album "Dahlia" and Luna Sea's album "Style" got Yomi into music, and Yomi covered Luna Sea, X Japan, Laputa, Rouage and La'cryma Christi in his high school days. Sakito cited Sugizo and Steve Vai as his main influences.

== Radio, webisodes and personal columns ==
=== Radio ===
Nightmare had a radio show on NACK5 called Jack in the Box!.Yomi and Hitsugi usually host the show, but other band members occasionally make appearances alongside them. Just recently announced on March 13, 2013, Jack in the Box! had its final airing on March 27, where all five members were on the show. The show is succeeded by Yomi's younger brother, Igaguri Chiba's "Chiba to Issho!"

Until December 2009, they also hosted a show on CBC Radio called Hyper Nightmare, where they featured tongue twisters, adult stories and phone-in sessions with listeners who could mimic interesting sound effects, TV personalities, anime characters, etc. Sakito was also a DJ for InterFM's show, UP's Beat, every Monday night in early January 2008.

On April 8, 2010, a radio-drama Ganbaru Squadron Mare Rangers (ガンバル戦隊メアレンジャー, Ganbaru Sentai Mea Renjaa) began to air. It featured special guests and the opportunity for fans to communicate with the band. The first series ended on October 14, 2010 and was already billed for a second season. The theme for season 2 was "to come in contact with the users/viewers," by which the members are able to call viewers via telephone in Japan.

=== Webisodes ===
Nightmare hosted a 6-episode monthly web show on Nico Nico, called Nightmare in Nightwear, in which the members wore pajamas, chatted, shared photos and anecdotes and interacted with web viewers. The show ended on January 21, 2010.

A new show titled Bakuretsu! Nightmare (爆烈！ナイトメア) began in March 2010 and featured a different punishment game every monthly episode.

=== Magazines ===
For a time, the band members took turns writing a monthly column called "Zozzy" which appeared in Shoxx Magazine. Since then, they have each had their own articles in various music magazines.

- Yomi's articles in Pati Pati, titled Certain Kill!! Gambler]->Taking Correspondence (必殺!! 遊び人]-> お便り募集, hisatsu!! asobinin]->otayori boshuu), focussed on him trying new things suggested by fans, like kick-boxing and sound production mixing. It debuted on September 9, 2008 and continued until March 2011. A collection of his past articles compiled into a book was released on March 25, 2011, along with a DVD that followed him sky-diving.
- Hitsugi had his in Shoxx titled Stepped on a Cat (猫ふんじゃった, neko funjatta) until December 2008.
- Sakito's was in B-Pass titled Where Will the Local Train Take Me? Journey in the Japanese Syllabary (鈍行いくの？~五十音の旅~, donkou iku no? gojuuon no tabi). He released a compilation of his travel articles that were published in B-Pass as a book that goes up to no (の). The book also had an extra article on his trip to Taiwan, along with a short DVD documentary of the trip. The book went on sale June 29, 2009. His recent articles talked about him getting his drivers' license and going to various places around Japan. His last article was printed in the June 2011 issue of B-Pass, with his trip to Sendai in a 2 part series. The second volume of his travel articles began from ha (は). The second volume included a special article on his trip to India, with a DVD documentary included. He also had a free paper column called Disc Garage Issue Free Paper "Di:Ga" Those Who Are Human in Visual Kei (ディスクガレージ発行フリーペーパー「DI:GA」 ヴィジュアル系だって人間だもの, disuku gareiji hakkou furii peipaa 「DI:GA」 Vijuarukei datte ningen damono). He is currently writing a new short story in KERA! Magazine and will be releasing another book titled "Tabisite Vol. 1 Cambodia."
- Ni~ya's was in Zy Magazine titled "Just Freak Out Let It Go." It has since ended.
- Ruka's was featured in Duet Magazine titled Coming out! Coming out! (出てる！出てる！, deteru! deteru!). The last article was published in the September 2009 issue.

== Solo projects ==
- RUKA: The LEGENDARY SIX NINE

The LEGENDARY SIX NINE (L69) is the solo project of Nightmare's RUKA. Each new release, the lineup will change with the exception of RUKA. He started this solo project to experiment with new sounds he is not able to make with Nightmare. The first lineup of artists consisted of HAKUEI from Penicillin on vocals, rapper TWIGGY on vocals, with SHINOBU and Takayama on guitars, Ni~ya on bass as support members, and RUKA on drums. The band debuted on March 24, 2010 with the single "CRUEL." Announced on Nightmare's homepage in July 2013, LSN will be restarting band activities for the little HEARTS.5th Anniversary "MY little HEARTS. Extra Edition Vol.1."

The first lineup was:

- Vocals: Hakuei (PENICILLIN)
- Vocals/Rapper: TWIGY
- Support Guitarists: SHINOBU (Creature Creature), Takayama
- Support Bassist: Ni~ya
- Drums: RUKA

The second lineup is:

- Vocals: Yuusa (THE KIDDIE)
- Guitar: Kei (baroque/ kannivalism)
- Guitar: SHINOBU (Creature Creature)
- Bass: Sugiya (Moi dix Mois)
- Drums: RUKA

The LEGENDARY SIX NINE will be releasing a mini-album titled "BELIAL" on October 16. It will come in two versions; Type A will come with 5 tracks and a DVD. Type B will be the CD only with 6 tracks. It will cost 2,100 yen.

- Hitsugi: GREMLINS

This is Hitsugi's solo project was announced on Nightmare's homepage in July 2013, GREMLINS made their debut at the little HEARTS.5th Anniversary "MY little HEARTS. Extra Edition Vol.1."

The members of GREMLINS are:

- Vocals and Guitar: Hitsugi or Hits
- Drums: Kenzo (ex: AYABIE)
- Support Bassist (alternating): Chiyu (SuG) and Ni~ya
- Support Guitarist: Mizuki (Sadie)

GREMLINS released its debut single titled "the Carnival" on October 16, 2013. This single came in two versions: Type A came with 3 tracks and a DVD. Type B came with a CD with 4 tracks.

== Sendai Kamotsu ==
Sendai Kamotsu is a side project of Nightmare formed in September 2001. It consists of entirely the same members, but they are different compared to their usual image, so much so that one may think them a different assemblage of musicians altogether. Sendai Kamotsu was formed in 2001 before Nightmare became successful. The story goes that Chiba is actually the "younger brother" of Nightmare's vocalist, Yomi. They were first featured in Nightmare's "Jishou -Shounen Terrorist-" PV, minus Chiba. Sendai Kamotsu have released several albums and singles and have toured independently from Nightmare.

== Charity and other work ==
In the summer of 2008, the Iwate-Miyagi Nairiku earthquake hit Nightmare's hometown of Sendai. When they heard about the tragedy, the band held a charity concert on September 26, 2008 at Zepp Sendai. Proceeds of the concert were donated to the victims. During their live house tour and arena tour ("Nightmare Live House Tour 2008 Killer Show" and "Nightmare Tour 2008 Grand Killer Show", respectively), they set up a donation box for proceeds to the earthquake and made a quick appearance on 24 Hour Television. They raised a total of 304,048 yen. They also invited victims of the earthquake to their show in Zepp Sendai as their guests of honour.

In light of the 2011 Tōhoku earthquake and tsunami, Nightmare held a fund-raising event for the victims called "publish and recover!" at Shinkiba Studio Coast on March 30, 2011.

=== Other work ===
- In the 2008 live action film adaptation of the 20th Century Boys manga, the band made a short cameo as the visual kei band playing at Friend's concert.
- Sakito had a small voice acting role in Majin Tantei Nōgami Neuro episode 17, as an electronically controlled bystander bicyclist in the chase scene.
- The band provided the opening theme "Raison d'être" (レゾンデートル, lit. Reason for being) for the anime Claymore.
- Ni~ya was a support bassist for Penicillin's single "Rainbow/Scream" that was released on August 20, 2008. He was also a support musician for Gackt in singles "Setsugekka" and "Ever".
- Hitsugi was a support guitarist for T.M. Revolution in a NHK Japan event, alongside Kenzo from Ayabie and other artists.

== Discography ==
=== Studio albums ===
- Ultimate Circus (December 25, 2003)
- Livid (November 25, 2004)
- Anima (February 22, 2006)
- The World Ruler (February 28, 2007)
- Killer Show (May 21, 2008)
- Majestical Parade (May 13, 2009)
- Nightmare (November 23, 2011)
- Scums (January 30, 2013)
- To Be or Not to Be (March 19, 2014)
- Carpe Diem (March 25, 2015)
- Nox:Lux (March 16, 2022)

== Tours ==
Year	Title
2004	Tour CPU 2004
2006	[Anima]lism
2007	The World Ruler Tour
2007	Dirty Influence Tour
2008	2008 Zepp Tour Six Point Killer Show
2009	Nightmare Live House Tour 2009 Parade of Nine
2009	Nightmare Tour 2009 Parade ~ Start of [X]pest Eve~.
2010	Request of Gianizm the Tour
2010	Nightmare 10th Anniversary Special Act. Vol.2: Re:Start of Tell(All)ism
2010	Nightmare 10th Anniversary Special Act. Vol.3 Historical ~The Highest Nightmare~.
2011	Time Rewind to Zero
2011	Zeppelin.
2011	Nightmare Tour 2011–2012 Nightmarish Reality
2012	To Mimic the Past
2012	Nightmare Premium Live at Shinkiba Studio Coast
2012	Natural Born Errors Nightmare vs. Baroque
2012	Nightmare Tour 2012 Final 'Deus ex Machina'
2013	beautiful SCUMS at Nakano Sun Plaza
2025	‘The WORLD’ European tour 2025

== Bibliography ==
- Nightmare (2008). Revelation［黙示録］photographs and history: BOOK-2 history (in Japanese). ぴあ. ISBN 978-4-8356-1704-6.
