= Gianizm =

Studio album and compilation album by Nightmare
- Released: January 1, 2010
- Genre: Heavy metal; alternative rock
- Length: 39:00
- Label: VAP
- Producer: Nightmare

Nightmare chronology
Majestical Parade (2009)	Gianizm (2010)	Historical ~The Highest Nightmare~ (2010)

Gianizm (ジャイアニズム, Jaianizumu) is one of Nightmare's 10th anniversary albums, released on January 1, 2010. Two different versions were released. One containing only a CD, and the other containing a CD+DVD. The album is a compilation of all the "Gianizm" tracks, including two new Gianizm tracks never before released. All tracks have been re-recorded for the album, excluding Shichi, Hachi, and Kyuu. The DVD included with the limited edition contains a video for each track. The album peaked at #19 in the Oricon chart, selling 18,201 copies in the first week (20,914 total reported sales).

== Track listing ==
CD
No.	Title	Length
1.	"Jishō (Shōnen Terrorist) ~Gianizm~ (自傷 (少年テロリスト) 〜ジャイアニズム〜, Self-mutilation (terrorist boy) ~Gianizm~)"	5:25
2.	"Gianizm Tsū/Two (ジャイアニズム痛, Massacre)"	4:01
3.	"Gianizm San (ジャイアニズム惨, Disaster)"	2:49
4.	"Gianizm Shi (ジャイアニズム死, Death)"	4:11
5.	"Gianizm Go (ジャイアニズム誤, Mistake)"	2:26
6.	"Gianizm Roku (ジャイアニズム碌, Inadequate)"	4:31
7.	"Gianizm Shichi (ジャイアニズム叱, Scold)"	5:04
8.	"Gianizm Hachi (ジャイアニズム罰, Punishment)"	3:12
9.	"Gianizm Kyuu (ジャイアニズム究, Research)"	2:38
10.	"Gianizm Ten (ジャイアニズム天, Heaven)"	4:42
Total length:		39:00

DVD
No.	Title	Length
1.	"自傷（少年テロリスト） from Ultimate Circus Finale 03.12.12 渋谷公会堂"
2.	"ジャイアニズム痛～生涯皆殺し～ from 極東シンフォニー ～the Five Stars Night～@BUDOKAN"
3.	"ジャイアニズム惨 from 極東シンフォニー ～the Five Stars Night～ @BUDOKAN"
4.	"ジャイアニズム死 ＰＶ"
5.	"ジャイアニズム誤 from Nightmare LIVE HOUSE TOUR 2008-killer show- at 新潟Lots"
6.	"ジャイアニズム碌 from TOUR 2006【ジャイアニズム痛】＠NHK HALL"
7.	"ジャイアニズム叱 from VISION OF the WORLD RULER at 東京国際フォーラムA"
8.	"ジャイアニズム罰 from TOUR 2008 Grand killer show＠東京国際フォーラム ホールA"
9.	"ジャイアニズム究 from NIGHTMARE PARADE TOUR FINAL “MAJESTIC”＠日本武道館(type B)"
10.	"ジャイアニズム天 ＰＶ"
