= Ultimate Circus =

Studio album by Nightmare
- Released: December 25, 2003
- Genre: Hard rock; alternative rock
- Length: 52:49
- Label: Nippon Crown
- Producer: Nightmare

Nightmare chronology
Ultimate Circus (2003)	Livid (2004)

Ultimate Circus is Nightmare's debut studio album. This album came in two versions, the regular version (as pictured), and another one in a black slip case. It peaked at #115 in the Oricon Charts.

Most of the songs have a heavy rock element, with the exception of 'Mind Ocean' and 'Aquaria', which are slower rock ballads to balance out the album. The album includes their major label debut single, Believe, as well as their triple A-side single, 茜/HATE/Over.

== Track listing ==
No.	Title	Length
1.	"Promenade"	02:23
2.	"muzzle.muzzle.muzzle"	02:56
3.	"M~aria"	04:13
4.	"Kabuki Logical (カブキロジカル)"	03:15
5.	"Believe"	03:03
6.	"Mind Ocean~Soushitsu wa Yuki to tomoni~ (Ｍｉｎｄ Ｏｃｅａｎ～喪失は雪と共に～)"	06:03
7.	"HATE"	03:43
8.	"Akane (茜)"	03:57
9.	"36.7°"	04:13
10.	"Kyokutou Ranshin Tengoku (極東乱心天国)"	04:07
11.	"loopain"	03:36
12.	"Over"	04:07
13.	"Aquaria (アクアリア, Akuaria)"	04:05
Total length:		49:41

== Single information ==
- Believe

Released: August 21, 2003
Oricon Chart peak position: #24

- 茜 / HATE / Over

Released: November 21, 2003
Oricon Chart peak position: #25
