= Mōryō no Hako =

Japanese novel by Natsuhiko Kyogoku

- Box of Goblins (Moryo no Hako) Vol.1

魍魎の匣
- Genre: Horror, Mystery
- Novel
- Written by: Natsuhiko Kyogoku
- Published by: Kodansha
- Imprint: Kodansha Novels
- Published: January 1995
- Live-action film

The Shadow Spirit
- Directed by: Masato Harada
- Produced by: Satoru Ogura; Issei Shibata; Kiyoshi Inoue
- Written by: Masato Harada
- Music by: Takatsugu Muramatsu
- Studio: Future Planet; Ogura Office
- Released: December 22, 2007
- Runtime: 133 minutes
- Manga
- Written by: Natsuhiko Kyogoku
- Illustrated by: Aki Shimizu
- Published by: Kadokawa Shoten
- Magazine: Comic Kwai
- Original run: August 2007 – April 2010
- Volumes: 5
- Anime television series
- Directed by: Ryōsuke Nakamura
- Produced by: Toshio Nakatani; Manabu Tamura
- Written by: Sadayuki Murai
- Music by: Shūsei Murai
- Studio: Madhouse
- Original network: Nippon TV
- Original run: October 7, 2008 – December 30, 2008
- Episodes: 13

Mōryō no Hako (魍魎の匣; "Box of Spirits and Goblins") is a Japanese novel by Natsuhiko Kyogoku. It is the second novel in the Kyōgokudō series that began with Summer of the Ubume. The novel has been turned into a live action feature film, a manga, an anime television series, and a stage musical.

== Story ==
The story takes place between August and October, 1952. It primarily follows crime fiction writer Tatsumi Sekiguchi and news magazine editor Morihiko Toriguchi as they investigate, with the help of onmyōji Akihiko Chūzenji, a series of unusual crimes that take place in Musashino and Mitaka.

Kanako Yuzuki and Yoriko Kusumoto are friends and middle school students. The two plan to go to Lake Sagami over summer break. On the night they are to leave, Kanako is hit by the train on which Tokyo police detective Shutarō Kiba is traveling. After the hospital stabilizes Kanako, her older sister, Yōko Yuzuki, has Kanako transferred to Kōshirō Mimasaka's research hospital. Several days later, the discovery of a severed arm and two boxed, severed legs catches the attention of Toriguchi, who travels by automobile with Atsuko Chūzenji and Sekiguchi to investigate.

Yoriko tells Kiba that Kanako was pushed into the train by a man wearing gloves. Shortly afterward, Kanako is apparently abducted from the hospital; Mimasaka's assistant, Tarō Suzaki, is murdered; and Kanako's guardian, Noritada Amemiya, also disappears. Witnesses report seeing a gloved man in the area where three other girls are soon abducted. Residents of the surrounding area later discover the girls' boxed, severed limbs.

Noriyuki Masuoka, the lawyer for Kanako's grandfather, hires private investigator Reijirō Enokizu to find Kanako. Masuoka explains that Yōko is actually Kanako's mother. Kanako is unaware of her true parentage, but she is the only heir to the fortune of Yōkō Shibata, who appointed Amemiya as her guardian.

Toriguchi obtains a list, labeled "Onbako-sama", of believers in a local cult led by Hyōei Terada, a self-proclaimed onmyōji. Toriguchi believes Terada is involved with the dismemberment case, because all the dismemberment victims are daughters of Terada's followers. Sekiguchi notices two names on the list: Yoriko's mother, and fiction writer Shunkō Kubo. As a fellow writer for the same publisher, Sekiguchi already knows Kubo, who always wears gloves. After Enokizu and Sekiguchi meet with Yoriko, she meets Kubo, who takes her to an abandoned temple filled with boxes. Later, Yoriko's severed arms are found.

From reading Kubo's latest fiction work, Chūzenji deduces that Kubo is the perpetrator of the dismemberment case. Chūzenji, Sekiguchi, and Enokizu confront Terada, and demonstrate that all of Terada's practices are fake. Terada confesses his swindle to the police, and reveals that Kubo is his son. Meanwhile, Tokyo police detective Bunzō Aoki goes to the abandoned temple that Kubo is using, but Kubo escapes. Later, Kubo's severed limbs are found.

Chūzenji tells Sekiguchi, Toriguchi, and Enokizu that he knew Mimasaka during the war. Mimasaka's research involved replacing biological human body parts with mechanical ones. Meanwhile, Kiba accuses Mimasaka of dismembering girls to further his research, and demands to know what he has done with Kanako. Sekiguchi, Toriguchi, and Enokizu pick up Yōko and arrive at Mimasaka's facility. Yōko tells them Mimasaka is her father. Chūzenji soon arrives with Masuoka, Aoki, and police constable Fukumoto.

Chūzenji recounts the series of events, beginning with Yoriko pushing Kanako onto the train tracks. Suzaki had been blackmailing Yōko, because he knew that Kanako was not Yōkō Shibata's legitimate heir. Since Mimasaka could keep only Kanako's head alive mechanically, Suzaki could easily stage her kidnapping and demand a ransom from Shibata. The first severed limbs found, before Kanako's abduction, were Kanako's. After Suzaki took Kanako's head, Amemiya killed Suzaki and ran away with Kanako's head. Kubo met Amemiya on a train and saw Kanako's head alive inside a box. Kubo himself then tried to keep the heads of other girls alive in a box. Kubo wrote about it all in his fiction. Before he killed Yoriko, she told him about Mimasaka. When he went to Mimasaka, in hopes of learning how to replicate what he saw, Mimasaka instead performed the same procedure on Kubo.

Aoki tries to arrest Mimasaka for what he did to Kubo, but Mimasaka grabs the box with Kubo's head and tries to escape with Yōko. Kubo bites Mimasaka in the neck and kills him, so Yōko kills Kubo. Kiba arrests Yōko for the murder of Kubo.

== Publication ==
The original novel was first published in 1995, and has been reprinted in several bunko editions.

== Adaptations ==
=== Film ===
The novel was turned into a 2007 live action movie, directed by Masato Harada and starring Shinichi Tsutsumi, Hiroshi Abe, Kippei Shiina, Hiroyuki Miyasako, and Rena Tanaka.

Shooting started in 2005 and completed in May 2007. The significant events of the novel are unchanged, but the remainder of the content is a bold alteration. To simulate 1952 Tokyo, exteriors were shot in Shanghai.

Mitsuki Tanimura won Best Supporting Actress at the 2008 Osaka Film Festival for her portrayal of Yoriko Kusumoto.

The DVD was released June 25, 2008.

=== Animated TV series ===
The anime adaptation began airing on October 7, 2008. Produced by Madhouse, Nippon TV, D.N. Dream Partners and VAP, the series was directed by Ryōsuke Nakamura, with Sadayuki Murai handling series composition, Clamp and Asako Nishida designing the characters and Shūsei Murai composing the music. The opening and ending themes of the anime are "Lost in Blue" and "NAKED LOVE" by the Japanese rock group Nightmare.

The series follows the novel, but some of the minor characters are slightly changed, and the series includes some original material. The original material includes:

- The sequences in which Sekiguchi reads his own work and the fiction of Kubo
- The clairvoyance experiments in episode 5
- Additional wartime experimentation ascribed to the research unit where Chūzenji and Mimasaka were staffed, apparently based on Unit 731 and Number Nine Research Laboratory

The anime distributor VAP released the Blu-ray disc of the television series on May 22, 2009, with a 16-minute OVA extra exclusive to the Blu-ray, revealing the investigative notes that Atsuko wrote in episode 6 about the brutal dismembering incidents in the main story.

==== Characters ====
===== Principal characters =====
Akihiko Chūzenji (中禅寺 秋彦, Chuuzenji Akihiko)
Onmyōji and book store owner, also known as Kyōgokudō (京極堂, Kyougokudou).
Tatsumi Sekiguchi (関口 巽, Sekiguchi Tatsumi)
Crime fiction writer.
Morihiko Toriguchi (鳥口 守彦, Toriguchi Morihiko)
Magazine news editor.
Shutarō Kiba (木場 修太郎, Kiba Shutarou)
Tokyo police detective.
Reijirō Enokizu (榎木津 礼二郎, Enokizu Reijirou))
Private investigator with the Rose Cross Detective Agency.

===== Significant characters =====
Kōshirō Mimasaka (美馬坂 幸四郎, Mimasaka Koushirou)
Medical researcher.
Tarō Suzaki (須崎 太郎, Suzaki Tarou)
Mimasaka's assistant.
Shunkō Kubo (久保 竣公, Kubo Shunkou)
Gothic fiction writer, the mysterious gloved man.
Hyōei Terada (寺田 兵衛, Terada Hyouei)
Cult leader and fake onmyōji.

===== Yuzuki family and associates =====
Kanako Yuzuki (柚木 加菜子, Yuzuki Kanako)
Middle school student.
Yōko Yuzuki (柚木 陽子, Yuzuki Youko)
Kanako's "older sister", formerly a film actress with the stage name Kinuko Minami (美波 絹子, Minami Kinuko).
Noriyuki Masuoka (増岡 則之, Masuoka Noriyuki)
Lawyer for Shibata Financial and private lawyer for Kanako's grandfather, Yōkō Shibata (柴田 耀弘, Shibata Youkou).
Noritada Amemiya (雨宮 典匡, Amemiya Noritada)
Kanako's guardian, appointed by Yōkō Shibata.

===== Kusumoto family and associates =====
Yoriko Kusumoto (楠本 頼子, Kusumoto Yoriko)
Middle school student and Kanako's friend.
Kimie Kusumoto (楠本 君枝, Kusumoto Kimie)
Yoriko's mother.
Sasagawa (笹川, Sasagawa)
Kimie's male friend.

===== Police =====
Aoki Bunzō (青木 文蔵, Bunzou Aoki)
Tokyo police detective.
Ishii (石井, Ishii)
Kanagawa police administrator, inspector rank.
Fukumoto (福本, Fukumoto)
Musashino policeman, constable rank.

===== Other characters =====
Atsuko Chūzenji (中禅寺 敦子, Chuuzenji Atsuko)
Akihiko's younger sister, a reporter for Toriguchi's magazine.
Chizuko Chūzenji (中禅寺 千鶴子, Chuuzenji Chizuko)
Akihiko's wife.
Yukie Sekiguchi (関口 雪絵, Sekiguchi Yukie)
Tatsumi's wife.

==== Episode list ====
| No. | Title (Note: There are no official English titles.) | Directed by | Written by | Original release date |
|---|---|---|---|---|
| 1 | "Five Angelic Death Omens Incident"; Transliteration: "Tennin no go sui no koto" (Japanese: 天人五衰の事) | Ryōsuke Nakamura | Sadayuki Murai | 7 October 2008 |
Tatsumi Sekiguchi reads part of a transcript, titled "The Woman inside the Box" by Shunkō Kubo; and imagines himself as the story's protagonist. In it, he is traveling to his grandmother's funeral on a train with another man, who possessed a box containing the live head of a girl. In the main storyline, Kanako Yuzuki chooses classmate Yoriko Kusumoto to be her friend. Yoriko's mother, Kimie, believes Yoriko has been influenced by a mōryō, an evil spirit, when Yoriko begins taking nighttime strolls with Kanako. Kanako and Yoriko plan to go to Lake Sagami over summer break. On the night they leave, Yoriko witnesses Kanako crying, as well as a pimple on the back of her neck; both points perplex Yoriko. Soon after, Kanako is hit by the train on which detective Shutarō Kiba is traveling.
| 2 | "Deceptive Tanuki Incident"; Transliteration: "Tanuki madowashi no koto" (Japanese: 狸惑わしの事) | Hiroshi Tsuruta | Sadayuki Murai | 14 October 2008 |
Sekiguchi reads more of "The Woman inside the Box," imagining himself as the protagonist. In it, he attends his grandmother's burial. Afterward, he continues to think about the girl in the box. In the main storyline, Kiba fails to get a coherent statement from Yoriko. Constable Fukumoto takes him and Yoriko to the hospital treating Kanako. Once there, Noriyuki Masuoka, Noritada Amemiya, and Yōko Yuzuki also arrive. Kiba and Fukumoto recognize Yōko as the former actress Kinuko Minami. After the hospital stabilizes Kanako, Yōko has her transferred to Kōshirō Mimasaka's hospital. Several days later, the discovery of a severed arm and two boxed, severed legs catches the attention of Morihiko Toriguchi, who travels with Atsuko Chūzenji and Sekiguchi to investigate. While driving around lost, they stumble upon Mimasaka's hospital.
| 3 | "Liberation Incident"; Transliteration: "Ukatōsen no koto" (Japanese: 羽化登仙の事) | Tōru Takahashi | Sadayuki Murai | 21 October 2008 |
Kiba thinks about the events of the last few days. In a non-linear flashback, Fukumoto escorts the transfer of Kanako to Mimasaka's hospital, a virtually-windowless box-like building in the middle of a forest. This facility is staffed by only two doctors, Mimasaka himself and Tarō Suzaki, as well as a maintenance engineer. Meanwhile, Kimie has become even more convinced that Yoriko is possessed. She brings Hyōei Terada to her house. He performs an exorcism of the house, and tells her that she can purify herself by giving him her tainted material wealth. Yoriko tells Kiba that Kanako was pushed by a man wearing gloves. Kanako disappears from the hospital, and Kiba later discovers Yōko with a ransom note in her hand.
| 4 | "Kasha Incident"; Transliteration: "Kasha no koto" (Japanese: 火車の事) | Hiromichi Matano | Sadayuki Murai | 28 October 2008 |
Sekiguchi reads more of "The Woman inside the Box", imagining himself as the protagonist. In it, he dismembers girls and wonders why he is unable to keep their heads alive. He resolves to meet the doctor that kept the girl alive in the box. In the main storyline, Kiba continues his flashback. Yōko asks Kiba to investigate, despite the Kanagawa police having jurisdiction. Later, Suzaki is found murdered, and Amemiya disappears. Back in the present, Sekiguchi's editor asks him to review a manuscript from Shunkō Kubo. A gloved man dismembers a prostitute. After Kiba is suspended from the Tokyo police, Bunzō Aoki asks him for help on the Musashino dismemberment case and Kanako's kidnapping. Kiba investigates Yōko and discovers that, during her film career, she was stalked by someone matching Suzaki's description. Kiba also investigates Mimasaka and discovers that he researched the creation of artificial, immortal soldiers during the war.
| 5 | "Clairvoyance Incident"; Transliteration: "Senrigan no koto" (Japanese: 千里眼の事) | migmi | Yoshinobu Fujioka | 4 November 2008 |
Sekiguchi reads a section of his own work titled "Vertigo" and imagines himself as the story's protagonist. In it, he pursues a woman through a large, empty house. In the main storyline, a flashback to 1880 recounts scholars testing Ikuko Nagao and Chizuko Mifune for clairvoyance. In 1911, they test Ikuko for psychic photography. One of the scholars reports to the press that clairvoyance is fake. Back in the present, Masuoka hires Reijirō Enokizu to find Kanako. Masuoka explains that Hiroya Shibata, the only heir to the fortune of Yōkō Shibata, eloped with Yōko Yuzuki before she became an actress. She later gave birth to Kanako. Yōkō agreed to fund all expenses for raising Kanako under the condition that Kanako must never know her true parentage. Amemiya was appointed to monitor that condition. After Hiroya died during the war, Kanako became Yōkō's heir, and Yōkō recently died. Sekiguchi introduces Toriguchi to Akihiko Chūzenji.
| 6 | "Box Incident"; Transliteration: "Hako no koto" (Japanese: 筥の事) | Kōjirō Tsuruoka | Sadayuki Murai | 11 November 2008 |
Atsuko interviews several kids in the area of the crimes. They all report seeing a man in dark clothes with white gloves. Sekiguchi and Toriguchi continue to meet with Chūzenji. Chūzenji describes the differences among espers, diviners, mediums, and priests. In particular, he cautions that people can mistakenly follow mediums as if they were prophets of a religion, but religions are organized by the believers, not the leaders. Toriguchi relates how he obtained a list of believers in a new religion. The list is labeled "Onbako-sama," but Onbako-sama is the name of a box that Hyōei Terada, the leader, has. Previously Terada was a box-maker. Onbako-sama is the source of his spiritual power. Furthermore, Terada's grandmother had a spiritual power that scholars tried to study. She left a box, inside which was a tin vase containing a piece of paper with the word "mōryō" written on it. Terada began gathering religious followers when he discovered the box in an attic after the war.
| 7 | "Mōryō Incident"; Transliteration: "Mōryō no koto" (Japanese: もうりょうの事) | Hiromichi Matano | Yoshinobu Fujioka | 18 November 2008 |
Sekiguchi reads more of "The Woman inside the Box," imagining himself as the protagonist. In it, he remembers being alone is the large house where he grew up. In the main storyline, Sekiguchi and Toriguchi continue to meet with Chūzenji. Toriguchi relates that the teachings of Onbako-sama are that mōryō gather in places that are enclosed. Chūzenji says that Terada has grasped the basic nature of mōryō. Toriguchi explains further that Terada convinces his followers that they must part from their impure materialism. Toriguchi wants to expose Terada as a criminal and believes Terada is involved with the dismemberment case, because all the victims are daughters of followers listed in the Onbako-sama membership registry. Sekiguchi notices that Shunkō Kubo is on the list of followers. Sekiguchi reads more of "The Woman inside the Box," imagining himself as the protagonist. In it, he sells the large house and rents a single room. He proceeds to fill the room with custom-made boxes.
| 8 | "Kotodama Incident"; Transliteration: "Kotodama no koto" (Japanese: 言霊の事) | Atsuko Kase | Sadayuki Murai | 25 November 2008 |
Sekiguchi reads more of "The Woman inside the Box," imagining himself as the protagonist. In it, he finishes filling his room with boxes when he receives notice of his grandmother's death. He takes a train to his grandmother's funeral and finds himself sitting with the man who has a box. In the main storyline, Sekiguchi gives a copy of the Onbako-sama registry to Satomura, the coroner in the dismemberment case. Satomura gives it to Kiba to give to Aoki. Sekiguchi, Toriguchi, and Enokizu meet with Chūzenji. Sekiguchi notices that Yoriko's mother is on the Onbako-sama list. Kiba arrives and overhears Enokizu telling the group that Yōko is Kanako's mother, not her sister. Chūzenji suggests Kiba and they share information. Yoriko finds herself locked out of her house as Enokizu and Sekiguchi arrive to talk to her. She excuses herself to meet the gloved man, who tells her he thinks he knows where Kanako is. The gloved man takes Yoriko to an abandoned temple filled with boxes.
| 9 | "Daughter Doll Incident"; Transliteration: "Musume ningyō no koto" (Japanese: 娘人形の事) | Satoshi Nakagawa | Yoshinobu Fujioka | 2 December 2008 |
Shunkō Kubo is the gloved man. "The Woman inside the Box" is more a diary than a work of fiction. In flashback, Enokizu and Sekiguchi are on their way to talk to Yoriko. Sekiguchi notices he forgot his copy of "The Woman inside the Box" at Chūzenji's. When they meet Kubo by chance in a cafe, they show him Kanako's picture. He is shaken and says he might be able to help find her. After they meet Yoriko and she leaves to meet Kubo, they break into Yoriko's house to find her mother attempting suicide. They tell her that she must protect Yoriko if she returns. Rejoining the timeline, Yōko tells Kiba that Mimasaka tried to cure her mother's myasthenia. Chūzenji has read "The Woman inside the Box." After Sekiguchi tells him that Kubo wears gloves, he deduces that Kubo is the perpetrator of the dismemberment case. Aoki stops by to say that Yoriko's severed arms have just been found.
| 10 | "Demon Incident"; Transliteration: "Oni no koto" (Japanese: 鬼の事) | Hideo Hayashi | Sadayuki Murai | 9 December 2008 |
The story that brought Kubo fame describes the meeting of a priest and mountain ascetic. The priest seals peoples' worries in stone shrines. The ascetic tries to stop it, but ends up joining the priest. Chūzenji believes the story is autobiographical and indicates Kubo is the ringleader behind Onbako-sama. Chūzenji, Sekiguchi, and Enokizu go to confront Terada. Chūzenji says that the box with a tin vase containing the written word "mōryō" was a clairvoyance test for Ikuko Nagao and that Onbako-sama is an iron box that contains the fingers of the man behind Terada. After Chūzenji demonstrates that all of Terada's practices are fake, Terada confesses the swindle to the police and reveals that Kubo is his son. Afterward, Chūzenji tells Sekiguchi and Toriguchi that he knew Yoriko would be the next victim because Kubo just went through the Onbako-sama register alphabetically. Meanwhile, Aoki goes to the abandoned shrine Kubo is using, but Kubo escapes by force. Aoki, injured in Kubo's flight, finds and opens the box containing Yoriko's head. Later, Kubo's severed limbs are found.
| 11 | "Rogue's Den Incident"; Transliteration: "Makutsu no koto" (Japanese: 魔窟の事) | Hiromichi Matano | Yoshinobu Fujioka | 16 December 2008 |
On the way to visit Aoki, Chūzenji tells Sekiguchi, Toriguchi, and Enokizu that he worked with Mimasaka during the war, although on a different project. Mimasaka researched replacing biological human body parts with mechanical ones to create soldiers who could not be killed. The only personal information Chūzenji ever learned about Mimasaka is that his wife's name was Kinuko. In a flashback, Kiba tells Yōko that he knows she is Kanako's mother. Yōko tells Kiba that she intends to claim Kanako's inheritance to pay for Kanako's medical care. In the present, Kiba goes to Mimasaka's hospital to confront him. Sekiguchi, Toriguchi, and Enokizu pick up Yōko and go to stop Kiba. Kiba accuses Mimasaka of dismembering girls to further his research, and demands to know what he has done with Kanako.
| 12 | "Brain Incident"; Transliteration: "Nōzui no Koto" (Japanese: 脳髄の事) | Kōjirō Tsuruoka | Sadayuki Murai | 23 December 2008 |
Sekiguchi reads a section of his own work, titled "Vertigo", and imagines himself as the story's protagonist. In it, an assassin appears to end the story. In the main storyline, Sekiguchi, Toriguchi, Enokizu, and Yōko arrive in time to stop Kiba from killing Mimasaka. Yōko reveals that Mimasaka is her father, and Enokizu hits the stunned Kiba for his foolishness. Chūzenji also arrives with Masuoka, Aoki, and Fukumoto. Chūzenji begins recounting the series of events, beginning with Yoriko pushing Kanako onto the train tracks, then reporting a perpetrator based on the assassin in Sekiguchi's "Vertigo." Mimasaka could only keep Kanako alive mechanically—a very expensive treatment. Suzaki had been blackmailing Yōko, because he knew that Hiroya Shibata and Yōko conspired to make it look like Kanako was Hiroya's child, but Yōko was already pregnant when they met. Since only Kanako's head remained alive, it would have been easy to stage her kidnapping and demand a ransom from Yōkō Shibata. In the present, Chūzenji confirms that Mimasaka is keeping Kubo's head alive, using the "hospital" as a mechanical human body.
| 13 | "Mōryō Box, or Human Incident"; Transliteration: "Mōryō no hako, aruiwa hito no koto" (Japanese: 魍魎の匣、あるいは人の事) | Atsuko Ishizuka; Ryōsuke Nakamura | Sadayuki Murai | 30 December 2008 |
Chūzenji continues recounting the series of events. The first severed limbs found, before Kanako's abduction, were Kanako's. After Suzaki took Kanako's head, Amemiya killed Suzaki and ran away with the head. Kubo met Amemiya on a train and saw Kanako's head alive inside the box. Kubo tried to keep the heads of other girls alive in a box for himself. Before he killed Yoriko, she told him about Mimasaka. Kubo wrote about it in "The Woman inside the Box", then went to Mimasaka, who performed the same procedure on Kubo. Mimasaka's project of implanting a human brain into a machine began when he tried to treat Kinuko's myasthenia. Mimasaka treated Kubo as simply another research subject. When the police try to arrest Mimasaka for what he did to Kubo, he grabs the box with Kubo's head and tries to escape with Yōko. Kubo bites Mimasaka in the neck and kills him, leading Yōko to kill Kubo. Kiba arrests Yōko for the murder of Kubo.
| OVA | "The Case Files of Chūzenji Atsuko: The Case of the Spirits in the Boxes"; Transliteration: "Chūzenji Atsuko no jikenbo hako no yūrei no koto" (Japanese: 中禅寺敦子の事件簿 箱の幽霊の事) | Ryōsuke Nakamura | Sadayuki Murai | 22 May 2009 |
In 1953, after the events surrounding the Musashino dismemberment case, Atsuko reflects on her participation in the investigation. She recalls how the descriptions by the witnesses who reported seeing a white-gloved man reminded her of Kubo and how strange Kubo's story "The Woman inside the Box" was. She also recalls her earlier investigation of a murder of a man by his wife and wonders why she is drawn to bizarre and violent stories. She concludes that writing about them is a kind of act of purification.

=== Manga ===
The manga adaptation features art by Aki Shimizu and a script by Natsuhiko Kyogoku himself, and began serialization in 2007. It is five volumes long.

=== Musical ===
A stage musical was produced in 2021. It has been recorded for TV broadcast. A later book in the series, Tesso no Ori, received a musical adaptation in 2024.

== See also ==
- The Summer of the Ubume, the first novel in the Kyōgokudō novel series
