= Hakuzōsu =

Mythical Japanese creature

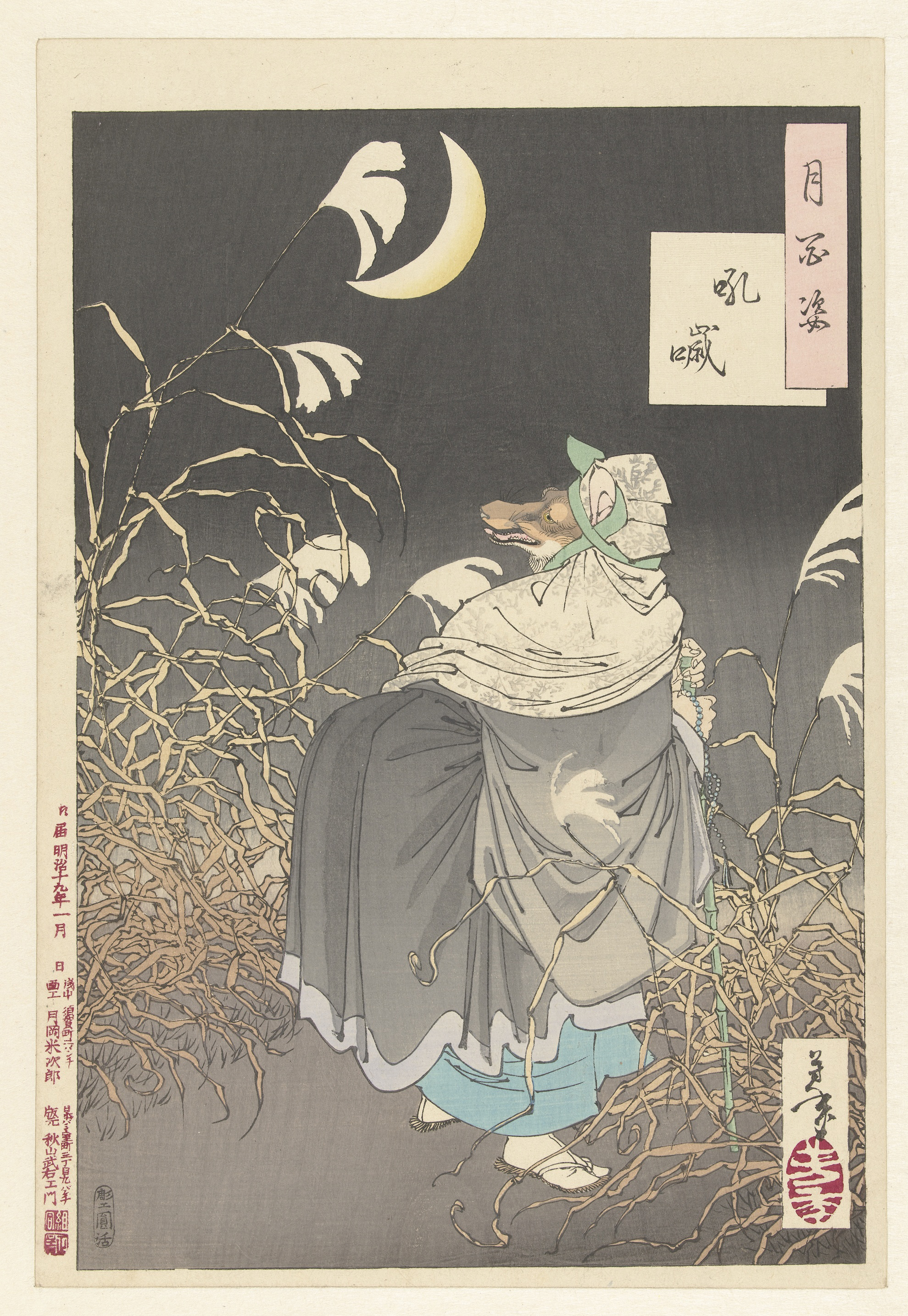
One_Hundred_Aspects_of_the_Moon #13 "Konkai (The Cry of the Fox)". Woodblock print by Tsukioka_Yoshitoshi.

Hakuzōsu (白蔵主), also written Hakuzosu and Hakuzousu, is the name of a popular kitsune character who pretended to be a priest in Japanese folklore.

== Legend ==
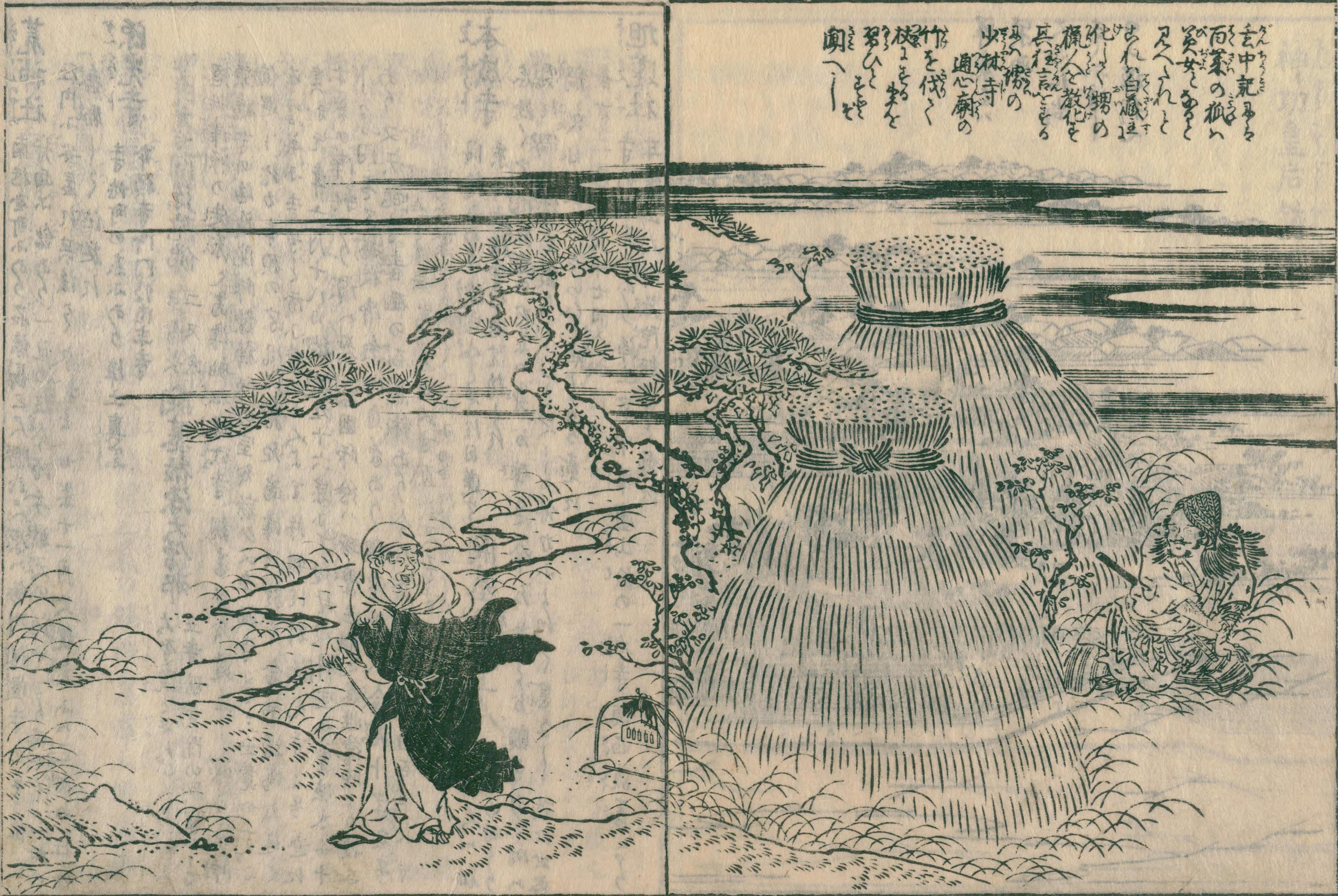
"Hakuzōsu" from Izumi meisho zue, Book 1, illustrated by Takehara Shunchōsai

The better known version of the legend is set in Shōrin-ji (小林寺) of Sakai, Izumi Province (now Osaka Prefecture), summarized in the actor Ōkura Toramitsu (大蔵虎光)'s Kyōgen fushin gami (狂言不審紙) (1823) as well as the engi history of the said temple, (Note: Shōrinji chinju konkai inari dai-myōjin engi (少林寺鎮守喚噦稲荷大明神縁起)).

Due to the late date of both documents, their appended note that this Shōrin-ji version inspired the kyōgen play, (Note: Kyōgen fushin gami (狂言不審紙) (1823): "和泉国大鳥郡東樽屋町小林寺中に、永徳年中耕雲庵と言塔頭有、其住侶を白蔵主と言り。稲荷大明神を信仰し毎日法施怠らず、明神感応有白狐を得る。此狐霊有随仕の用を達、又盗難を避る事あり。或時は蔵王の甥の家に行、殺生の罪を戒めしと、是狂言に作る（後略）") is considered a specious claim. There is no written evidence on this anywhere close to the 16th century when the play Trurigitsune about this fox is already known to have existed (attested in the Tenshō-bon of 1581) Cf. § Tsurigitsune below.

A variant legend is set in Shōraku-ji (勝楽寺) of Ōmi Province (Shiga Prefecture), also summarized in the fushin gami. (Note: Kyōgen fushin gami 狂言不審紙 （1823）: "此勝楽寺、蔵王の住し寺なりと云。又藪の内に釣人の旧地ありと。兄を小兵衛弟を小十郎と云杯、右白蔵主と伯父甥の中成よし。其村五郎右衛門と申者方に伝書ありと云".)

In the adapted Hyaku monogatari version, the setting shifts to Kai Province (cf. § Hyaku monogatari). Some well known elements such as the fox loving fried mouse is not in these legend texts, but are a part of the kyōgen play.

=== Shōrin-ji ===
Shōrin-ji (in what is now Sakai, Osaka) in Izumi Province is said to have been founded Bunna 1/1352, propitiating the Inari dai-myōjin according to the engi history of the temple. According to this document, the temple's own version of its history, Shōrin-ji had attached to it a tacchū or small hall called Kōun-an (耕雲庵), where lived a priest named Hakuzōsu (伯蔵司) during the years 1526–1555 (Note: Tenbun era, during Emperor Go-Nara's reign. which narrows down the year span.) who had no income and destitute, thus praying 7 days and 7 nights, when a three-legged white fox darted out of the altar and curled up before him. The priest interpreted this happenstance to be a gift from the Inari deity, and fostered the fox, and from then, he received plenty of alms from devotees. The fox even transformed into a brave warrior and warded off bandits. The priest had a nephew who hunted foxes for a living, and the white fox also used his shapeshifting to impersonate Priest Hakuzō, but the man was shrewd and guessed it was the fox in disguise, so he tried to use every trick of his hunting trade to trap the fox.

But the aforementioned Kyōgen fushin gami dates the presence of the priest Hakuzōsu (白蔵主) at Kōun-an of Shōrin-ji much earlier, during the Eitoku era years of 1381 onward. He regularly venerated the Inari dai-myōjin and never forgot the daily priestly duty, thereby receiving a white fox, etc., thus otherwise matching the engi's summary.

This version is reprinted in geographical and travel guides of the Edo period such as the Sakai kagami (堺鑑), Senshūshi (泉州志)』, Izuki e]meisho zue (和泉名所図会), the essay Wago renjushū (和語連珠集), and the encyclopedia Wakan sansai zue. (Note: Satake：「狂言不審紙」is quoted/paraphrased in a host of works as; "「堺鑑」以後、「泉州志」「和語連珠集」「和漢三才図会」その他..")

In Sakai kagami (or Wago renjushū) it merely states the priest found a three-legged wild fox in the woods and raised it, adding that its descendants all inherited the three-leggedness and a clan of them still occupied the premises of the same temple.

=== Shōraku-ji ===
Shōraku-ji in Ōmi Province is stated to have been established around the same period as the rival legend temple (before 1385) (Note: It does not state Eitoku era, but for some reason gives "Taian era", which is not an identifiable era in Japan. However, it goes on to state that Tenpō 5 (1835) marked over 450 years since inception".) as a subordinate temple to Kennin-ji in Kyoto. This Shōraku-ji also lays claim to Hakuzōsu (白蔵主) living there, who had two nephews, named Kohei and Kojūrō.

== Adaptations ==
=== Tsurigitsune ===
The legend of Hakuzōsu became a Kyōgen play, Tsurigitsune (‘Fox Trapping’) also known by the title Konkai (‘The Cry of the Fox’).

In this story, a hunter is visited by his uncle, the priest Hakuzōsu, who lectures his nephew on the evils of killing foxes. The hunter is nearly convinced, but after the priest departs, he hears the cry of the fox and realizes it wasn't his uncle after all but a fox in disguise. The fox resumes his natural form and reverts to his wild ways, takes the bait in a trap and is captured.

=== Hyaku monogatari ===
In the Hyaku monogatari version of the story, a hunter named Yasaku made his living trapping foxes for fur at the base of Mt. Yume in Kai Province. An ancient fox lost many offspring, and upon learning that the man's uncle was the priest Hakuzōsu at Hōtōji (宝塔寺), assumed the priest's identity and preached the evils of animal slaying for his "future" (i.e. that the karma would damn him to a wicked reincarnation), and carried away all the traps for a sum of money. But the fox saw the hunter walking towards the temple, and fearing his ploy would be exposed, went ahead and killed the priest, now assuming his identity permanently, and lived on for priest for another 50 years, until it was chewed to death by the dog of one Satō Tarō on the occasion of a village festival.

== Folkloristics ==
In the "A Type and Motif Index of Japanese Folk-Literature" compiled by Hiroko Ikeda, motif "68* The Fox Jeers at the Fox-Trap" lists "Tsuri-gitsune, Konkwai, Hakuzoosu" as representative, with pattern "I. Fox Disguised as Uncle" conforming to these tales.
