= Carpe Diem (Nightmare album) =

Studio album by Nightmare
- Released: March 25, 2015
- Genres: Alternative rock; heavy metal; gothic rock
- Label: Avex, HPQ
- Producer: Nightmare

Carpe Diem is Nightmare's tenth full-length studio album. As with all of their recent album and single releases, it came in three different versions, each with different artwork. The two limited editions (Types A & B), each come with different DVD tracks while the standard edition (Type C) came with one extra song. The album peaked #7 in the Oricon charts.

== Track listing ==
Regular edition (type C)
No.	Title	Length
1.	"Siva"	5:35
2.	"boku no kirai na kimi ga shindara, boku wa warau no darou ka (僕の嫌いな君が死んだら、僕は笑うのだろうか)"	3:39
3.	"TABOO"	3:42
4.	"koukotsu (恍惚)"	4:23
5.	"Quints"	4:23
6.	"Nyuumetsu -entering nirvana- (入滅 -entering nirvana-)"	3:54
7.	"blur"	4:47
8.	"Demand"	3:21
9.	"NAMELESS"	4:00
10.	"fade"	4:26
11.	"the DOOL"	0:43
12.	"Gokujou Noushin Rengoku•Nishiki (極上脳震煉獄・弐式)"	3:50
13.	"Tao (Note: Track only included on Type C album)"	3:58
Total length:		50:41

=== Limited edition A ===
Type A bonus DVD track
No.	Title	Length
13.	"Quints PV"

=== Limited edition B ===
Type B bonus DVD: Nightmare FC Limited Live 2015 @ Ex Theater Roppongi
No.	Title	Length
13.	"blur"
14.	"Buddies"
15.	"Such a Nonsense System"

== Single information ==
- Taboo

Released: June 25, 2014
Oricon chart peak position: #6

- Blur

Released: January 1, 2015
Oricon chart peak position: #8
