= 2024 in anime =

Events in 2024 in anime.

== Releases ==
=== Films ===
A list of anime films that were released in theaters between January 1 and December 31, 2024.

| Release date | Title | Studio | Director(s) | Running time (minutes) | Ref. |
|---|---|---|---|---|---|
| January 5 | Bloody Escape: Jigoku no Tōsō Geki | Polygon Pictures | Gorō Taniguchi | 97 | |
| January 12 | Kizumonogatari: Koyomi Vamp | Shaft | Tatsuya Oishi | 144 | |
| January 26 | Mobile Suit Gundam SEED Freedom | Bandai Namco Filmworks | Mitsuo Fukuda | 124 | |
| January 27 | Given the Movie: Hiiragi Mix | Lerche | Noriko Hashimoto | 70 | |
| February 2 | Ōmuro-ke: Dear Sisters | Passione; Studio Lings | Naoyuki Tatsuwa | 43 | |
| February 16 | Haikyu!! The Dumpster Battle | Production I.G | Susumu Mitsunaka | 85 | |
| March 1 | Paripi Kōmei: Road to Summer Sonia | P.A. Works | Shū Honma | 119 | |
| March 1 | Doraemon: Nobita's Earth Symphony | Shin-Ei Animation | Kazuaki Imai | 120 | |
| March 22 | Dead Dead Demon's Dededede Destruction (part 1) | Production +h. | Tomoyuki Kurokawa | 120 | |
| April 12 | Detective Conan: The Million Dollar Pentagram | TMS Entertainment | Chika Nagaoka | 111 | |
| April 12 | Kuramerukagari | Team OneOne | Shigeyoshi Tsukahara | 62 | |
| April 12 | Kurayukaba | Team OneOne | Shigeyoshi Tsukahara | 62 | |
| April 19 | Blue Lock: Episode Nagi | Eight Bit | Shunsuke Ishikawa | 91 | |
| May 10 | Code Geass: Rozé of the Recapture (part 1) | Bandai Namco Filmworks | Yoshimitsu Ohashi | 74 | |
| May 10 | Trapezium | CloverWorks | Masahiro Shinohara | 94 | |
| May 10 | Umamusume: Pretty Derby – Road to the Top | CygamesPictures | Chengzhi Liao | 98 | |
| May 17 | Iris the Movie: Full Energy!! | Studio Gokumi | Hiroshi Ikehata | 60 | |
| May 24 | My Oni Girl | Studio Colorido | Tomotaka Shibayama | 112 | |
| May 24 | Umamusume: Pretty Derby – Beginning of a New Era | CygamesPictures | Ken Yamamoto | 108 | |
| May 24 | Dead Dead Demon's Dededede Destruction (part 2) | Production +h. | Tomoyuki Kurokawa | 120 | |
| June 7 | Bocchi the Rock! Re: | CloverWorks | Keiichirō Saitō | 92 | |
| June 7 | Code Geass: Rozé of the Recapture (part 2) | Bandai Namco Filmworks | Yoshimitsu Ohashi | 76 | |
| June 14 | A Few Moments of Cheers | 100studio; Hurray! | POPREQ | 68 | |
| June 14 | Rabbits Kingdom the Movie | Studio Sign | Masayoshi Ozaki | 94 | |
| June 21 | Ōmuro-ke: Dear Friends | Passione; Studio Lings | Naoyuki Tatsuwa | 43 | |
| June 28 | Anpanman: Baikinman and Lulun in the Picture Book | TMS Entertainment | Jun Kawagoe | 64 | |
| June 28 | Look Back | Studio Durian | Kiyotaka Oshiyama | 58 | |
| July 5 | Code Geass: Rozé of the Recapture (part 3) | Bandai Namco Filmworks | Yoshimitsu Ohashi | 76 | |
| July 19 | Star Blazers: Space Battleship Yamato 3199 (part 1) | Studio Mother | Harutoshi Fukui (Chief); Naomichi Yamato | 50 | |
| July 19 | Ghost Cat Anzu | Shin-Ei Animation; Miyu Productions | Yōko Kuno; Nobuhiro Yamashita | 90 | |
| July 19 | Gekijōban SutoPuri Hajimari no Monogatari: Strawberry School Festival!!!! | Liden Films | Naoki Matsuura | | |
| July 26 | Mononoke the Movie: Phantom in the Rain | EOTA | Kenji Nakamura | | |
| August 2 | Code Geass: Rozé of the Recapture (part 4) | Bandai Namco Filmworks | Yoshimitsu Ohashi | 74 | |
| August 2 | My Hero Academia: You're Next | Bones | Tensai Okamura | | |
| August 9 | Bocchi the Rock! Re:Re: | CloverWorks | Keiichirō Saitō | 73 | |
| August 9 | Crayon Shin-chan the Movie: Our Dinosaur Diary | Shin-Ei Animation | Shinobu Sasaki | 106 | |
| August 16 | Touken Ranbu Dо̄den: Chikashi Samuraira Umonora | DOMERICA | Kazuya Ichikawa | | |
| August 16 | Zegapain STA | Bandai Namco Filmworks | Masami Shimoda | | |
| August 30 | The Colors Within | Science Saru | Naoko Yamada | | |
| September 6 | Love Live! Nijigasaki High School Idol Club Final Chapter (part 1) | Bandai Namco Filmworks | Tomoyuki Kawamura | | |
| September 13 | Wonderful PreCure! The Movie | Toei Animation | Naoki Miyahara | | |
| September 20 | Given the Movie: To the Sea | Lerche | | | |
| September 20 | Overlord: The Sacred Kingdom | Madhouse | Naoyuki Itō | | |
| September 20 | The Quintessential Quintuplets* | Bibury Animation Studios | Masato Jinbo | | |
| September 27 | BanG Dream! Spring Sunshine, Lost Cat | Sanzigen | Kōdai Kakimoto | | |
| October 4 | Fureru | CloverWorks | Tatsuyuki Nagai | | |
| October 25 | Ganbatte Ikimasshoi | Studio Moe; Reirs | Yūhei Sakuragi | | |
| November 8 | Attack on Titan The Movie: The Last Attack | MAPPA | Yuichiro Hayashi | 145 | |
| November 8 | BanG Dream! Sing, Songs That Become Us & Film Live | Sanzigen | Kōdai Kakimoto | | |
| November 8 | Fuuto PI: The Portrait of Kamen Rider Skull | Studio Kai | Yousuke Kabashima | | |
| November 22 | Star Blazers: Space Battleship Yamato 3199 (part 2) | Studio Mother | Harutoshi Fukui (Chief); Naomichi Yamato | 97 | |
| November 29 | Pui Pui Molcar the Movie: MOLMAX | | Mankyū | | |
| November 29 | Solo Leveling: ReAwakening | A-1 Pictures | Shunsuke Nakashige | | |
| November 29 | Yohane the Parhelion: Sunshine in the Mirror | | | 89 | |
| December 20 | Gekijōban Nintama Rantaro Dokutake Ninjatai Saikyō no Gunshi | Ajia-do Animation Works | Masaya Fujimori | | |

=== Television series ===
A list of anime television series that debuted between January 1 and December 31, 2024.

| First run start and end dates | Title | Episodes | Studio | Director(s) | Original title | Ref. |
|---|---|---|---|---|---|---|
| January 3 – March 20 | Ishura | 12 | Passione; Sanzigen (CGI) | Takeo Takahashi (Chief); Yuki Ogawa | | |
| January 3 – March 27 | Classroom of the Elite (season 3) | 13 | Lerche | Seiji Kishi (Chief); Hiroyuki Hashimoto (Chief); Yoshihito Nishōji | Yōkoso Jitsuryoku Shijō Shugi no Kyōshitsu e | |
| January 3 – March 27 | Bottom-tier Character Tomozaki 2nd Stage | 13 | Project No.9 | Shinsuke Yanagi | Jaku-kyara Tomozaki-kun 2nd Stage | |
| January 3 – March 27 | Gushing over Magical Girls | 13 | Asahi Production | Masato Suzuki; Atsushi Ōtsuki | Mahō Shōjo ni Akogarete | |
| January 4 – March 21 | Chained Soldier | 12 | Seven Arcs | Junji Nishimura (Chief); Gorō Kuji | Mato Seihei no Slave | |
| January 4 – June 13 | Delicious in Dungeon | 24 | Trigger | Yoshihiro Miyajima | Dungeon Meshi | |
| January 5 – March 22 | My Instant Death Ability Is So Overpowered | 12 | Okuruto Noboru | Masakazu Hishida | Sokushi Cheat ga Saikyōsugite, Isekai no Yatsura ga marude Aite ni Naranain Desu ga | |
| January 5 – March 22 | Sasaki and Peeps | 12 | Silver Link | Mirai Minato | Sasaki to Pii-chan | |
| January 6 – March 30 | The Wrong Way to Use Healing Magic | 13 | Studio Add; Shin-Ei Animation | Takahide Ogata | Chiyu Mahō no Machigatta Tsukaikata | |
| January 6 – March 30 | Mashle: Magic and Muscles – The Divine Visionary Candidate Exam Arc | 12 | A-1 Pictures | Tomoya Tanaka | Mashle: Kami Shinkakusha Kōho Senbatsu Shiken-hen | |
| January 6 – March 23 | Pon no Michi | 12 | OLM | Tatsuma Minamikawa | | |
| January 6 – March 23 | Tales of Wedding Rings | 12 | Staple Entertainment | Takashi Naoya | Kekkon Yubiwa Monogatari | |
| January 6 – March 27 | Stick It on Around! Koinu | 12 | Opera House | Ai Ikegaya | Hari Maware! Koinu | |
| January 6 – March 23 | A Sign of Affection | 12 | Ajia-do Animation Works | Yūta Murano | Yubisaki to Renren | |
| January 6 – March 23 | The Demon Prince of Momochi House | 12 | Drive | Bob Shirahata | Momochi-san Chi no Ayakashi Ōji | |
| January 7 – March 24 | 7th Time Loop: The Villainess Enjoys a Carefree Life Married to Her Worst Enemy! | 12 | Studio Kai; Hornets | Kazuya Iwata | Loop 7-kaime no Akuyaku Reijō wa, Moto Tekikoku de Jiyū Kimamana Hanayome Seikatsu o Mankitsu Suru | |
| January 7 – March 24 | The Strongest Tank's Labyrinth Raids | 12 | Studio Polon | Mitsutaka Noshitani | Saikyō Tank no Meikyū Kōryaku | |
| January 7 – March 24 | Banished from the Hero's Party (season 2) | 12 | Studio Flad | Makoto Hoshino (Chief); Satoshi Takafuji | Shin no Nakama janai to Yūsha no Party o Oidasareta node, Henkyō de Slow Life Suru Koto ni Shimashita 2nd | |
| January 7 – March 31 | The Dangers in My Heart (season 2) | 13 | Shin-Ei Animation | Hiroaki Akagi | Boku no Kokoro no Yabai Yatsu | |
| January 7 – March 31 | Solo Leveling | 12 | A-1 Pictures | Shunsuke Nakashige | Ore dake Level Up na Ken | |
| January 7 – March 24 | Blue Exorcist: Shimane Illuminati Saga | 12 | Studio VOLN | Daisuke Yoshida | Ao no Exorcist: Shimane Illuminati-hen | |
| January 7 – March 24 | Fluffy Paradise | 12 | EMT Squared | Jun'ichi Kitamura | Isekai de Mofumofu Nadenade Suru Tameni Ganbattemasu | |
| January 8 – March 25 | High Card (season 2) | 12 | Studio Hibari | Junichi Wada | | |
| January 8 – March 25 | The Unwanted Undead Adventurer | 12 | Connect | Noriaki Akitaya | Nozomanu Fushi no Bōkensha | |
| January 8 – June 24 | Tsukimichi: Moonlit Fantasy (season 2) | 25 | J.C.Staff | Shinji Ishihira | Tsuki ga Michibiku Isekai Dōchū | |
| January 8 – March 25 | Mr. Villain's Day Off | 12 | Shin-Ei Animation; SynergySP | Yoshinori Odaka | Kyūjitsu no Warumono-san | |
| January 9 – March 26 | Synduality: Noir (part 2) | 12 | Eight Bit | Yusuke Yamamoto | | |
| January 9 – March 26 | 'Tis Time for "Torture," Princess | 12 | Pine Jam | Yōko Kanemori | Hime-sama "Gōmon" no Jikan desu | |
| January 9 – March 26 | The Foolish Angel Dances with the Devil | 12 | Children's Playground Entertainment | Itsuro Kawasaki | Oroka na Tenshi wa Akuma to Odoru | |
| January 9 – March 26 | Hokkaido Gals Are Super Adorable! | 12 | Silver Link; Blade | Mirai Minato (Chief); Misuzu Hoshino | Dosanko Gyaru wa Namaramenkoi | |
| January 9 – March 26 | Villainess Level 99 | 12 | Jumondou | Minoru Yamaoka | Akuyaku Reijō Level 99: Watashi wa Ura Boss Desu ga Maō dewa Arimasen | |
| January 10 – March 27 | Doctor Elise | 12 | Maho Film | Kumiko Habara | Gekai Elise | |
| January 10 – April 3 | Shaman King: Flowers | 13 | Bridge | Takeshi Furuta | | |
| January 11 – March 28 | Delusional Monthly Magazine | 12 | OLM Team Yoshioka | Chizuru Miyawaki | Gekkan Mōsō Kagaku | |
| January 11 – April 4 | Sengoku Youko (part 1) | 13 | White Fox | Masahiro Aizawa | Sengoku Yōko: Yonaoshi Kyōdai-hen | |
| January 11 – April 4 | Metallic Rouge | 13 | Bones | Yutaka Izubuchi (Chief); Motonobu Hori | | |
| January 11 – March 28 | Brave Bang Bravern! | 12 | CygamesPictures | Masami Ōbari | Yūki Bakuhatsu Bang Bravern | |
| January 11 – March 28 | Cherry Magic! Thirty Years of Virginity Can Make You a Wizard?! | 12 | Satelight | Yoshiko Okuda | Sanjūsai made Dōtei Da to Mahōtsukai ni Nareru rashii | |
| January 12 – March 29 | Isekai Onsen Paradise | 12 | BloomZ; Wolfsbane | Tomonori Mine | Meitō "Isekai no Yu" Kaitaku-ki: Arafō Onsen Mania Tensei-saki wa, Nonbiri Onsen Tengoku Deshita | |
| January 12 – March 29 | The Weakest Tamer Began a Journey to Pick Up Trash | 12 | Studio Massket | Shigeyasu Yamauchi (Chief); Naoki Horiuchi | Saijaku Tamer wa Gomihiroi no Tabi o Hajimemashita | |
| January 12 – April 5 | The Witch and the Beast | 12 | Yokohama Animation Laboratory | Takayuki Hamana | Majo to Yajū | |
| January 12 – June 21 | Urusei Yatsura (season 2) | 23 | David Production | Takahiro Kamei; Hideya Takahashi; Yasuhiro Kimura | | |
| January 13 – March 30 | Snack Basue | 12 | Studio Puyukai | Minoru Ashina | | |
| January 13 – April 6 | Bucchigiri?! | 12 | MAPPA | Hiroko Utsumi | | |
| January 14 – March 17 | The Fire Hunter (season 2) | 10 | Signal.MD | Junji Nishimura | Hikari no Ō | |
| January 14 – March 17 | Meiji Gekken: 1874 | 10 | Tsumugi Akita Animation Lab | Jin Tamamura | | |
| January 14 – March 31 | Kingdom (season 5) | 13 | Pierrot; Studio Signpost | Kenichi Imaizumi | | |
| February 4 – January 26, 2025 | Wonderful PreCure! | 50 | Toei Animation | Masanori Sato | | |
| February 11 – May 5 | Ninja Kamui | 13 | E&H Production; Sola Entertainment | Sunghoo Park | | |
| April 1 – June 24 | Gods' Games We Play | 13 | Liden Films | Tatsuya Shiraishi | Kami wa Game ni Ueteiru | |
| April 1 – June 24 | Train to the End of the World | 12 | EMT Squared | Tsutomu Mizushima | Shūmatsu Train Doko e Iku? | |
| April 2 – May 21 | Touken Ranbu Kai: Kyoden Moyuru Honnōji | 8 | DOMERICA | Kazuya Ichikawa | | |
| April 2 – September 24 | Spice and Wolf: Merchant Meets the Wise Wolf | 25 | Passione | Takeo Takahashi (Chief); Hijiri Sanpei | Ōkami to Kōshinryō: Merchant Meets the Wise Wolf | |
| April 2 – June 18 | I Was Reincarnated as the 7th Prince so I Can Take My Time Perfecting My Magical Ability | 12 | Tsumugi Akita Animation Lab | Jin Tamamura | Tensei Shitara Dai Nana Ōji Datta no de, Kimama ni Majutsu o Kiwamemasu | |
| April 2 – June 18 | The Banished Former Hero Lives as He Pleases | 12 | Studio Deen; Marvy Jack | Kazuomi Koga | Dekisokonai to Yobareta Moto Eiyū wa, Jikka kara Tsuihōsareta node Suki Katte ni Ikiru Koto ni Shita | |
| April 3 – March 26, 2025 | Chibi Godzilla Raids Again (season 2) | 52 | Pie in the Sky | Taketo Shinkai | Chibi Godzilla no Gyakushū | |
| April 4 – June 20 | A Condition Called Love | 12 | East Fish Studio | Tomoe Makino | Hananoi-kun to Koi no Yamai | |
| April 4 – June 20 | Bartender: Glass of God | 12 | Liber | Ryōichi Kuraya | Bartender: Kami no Glass | |
| April 4 – June 20 | Laid-Back Camp (season 3) | 12 | Eight Bit | Shin Tosaka | Yuru Camp: Season 3 | |
| April 5 – June 21 | Re:Monster | 12 | Studio Deen | Takayuki Inagaki | | |
| April 5 – June 21 | A Salad Bowl of Eccentrics | 12 | SynergySP; Studio Comet | Masafumi Satō | Henjin no Salad Bowl | |
| April 5 – June 21 | Nijiyon Animation (season 2) | 12 | Bandai Namco Filmworks | Yūya Horiuchi | | |
| April 5 – June 21 | Astro Note | 12 | Telecom Animation Film | Shinji Takamatsu (Chief); Haruki Kasugamori | | |
| April 5 – June 21 | An Archdemon's Dilemma: How to Love Your Elf Bride | 12 | Brain's Base | Hiroshi Ishiodori | Maō no Ore ga Dorei Elf o Yome ni Shitanda ga, Dō Medereba Ii? | |
| April 5 – June 28 | The Irregular at Magic High School (season 3) | 13 | Eight Bit | Jimmy Stone | Mahōka Kōkō no Rettōsei | |
| April 5 – June 28 | Wind Breaker | 13 | CloverWorks | Toshifumi Akai | | |
| April 5 – September 27 | That Time I Got Reincarnated as a Slime (season 3) | 24 | Eight Bit | Atsushi Nakayama | Tensei Shitara Slime Datta Ken | |
| April 6 – September 21 | Yatagarasu: The Raven Does Not Choose Its Master | 20 | Pierrot | Yoshiaki Kyōgoku | Karasu wa Aruji o Erabanai | |
| April 6 – June 15 | Studio Apartment, Good Lighting, Angel Included | 12 | Okuruto Noboru | Kenta Ōnishi | One Room, Hiatari Futsū, Tenshi-tsuki | |
| April 6 – June 22 | Highspeed Etoile | 12 | Studio A-Cat | Keitaro Motonaga | | |
| April 6 – June 22 | The Idolmaster Shiny Colors (season 1) | 12 | Polygon Pictures | Mankyū | | |
| April 6 – June 29 | Girls Band Cry | 13 | Toei Animation | Kazuo Sakai | | |
| April 6 – June 29 | Tonbo! (season 1) | 13 | OLM | Jin Gu Oh | Ōi! Tonbo | |
| April 7 – June 16 | Grandpa and Grandma Turn Young Again | 11 | Gekkō | Masayoshi Nishida | Jii-san Baa-san Wakagaeru | |
| April 7 – June 23 | As a Reincarnated Aristocrat, I'll Use My Appraisal Skill to Rise in the World (season 1) | 12 | Studio Mother | Takao Kato | Tensei Kizoku, Kantei Skill de Nariagaru | |
| April 7 – June 23 | Blue Archive the Animation | 12 | Yostar Pictures; Candy Box | Daigo Yamagishi | | |
| April 7 – June 23 | Jellyfish Can't Swim in the Night | 12 | Doga Kobo | Ryōhei Takeshita | Yoru no Kurage wa Oyogenai | |
| April 7 – June 23 | The Duke of Death and His Maid (season 3) | 12 | J.C.Staff | Yoshinobu Yamakawa | Shinigami Bocchan to Kuro Maid | |
| April 7 – June 23 | Vampire Dormitory | 12 | Studio Blanc | Nobuyoshi Nagayama | | |
| April 7 – June 30 | Go! Go! Loser Ranger! | 12 | Yostar Pictures | Keiichi Sato | Sentai Daishikkaku | |
| April 7 – June 30 | Sound! Euphonium 3 | 13 | Kyoto Animation | Tatsuya Ishihara | Hibike! Euphonium 3 | |
| April 7 – June 30 | Tonari no Yōkai-san | 13 | Liden Films | Aimi Yamauchi | | |
| April 7 – | Himitsu no AiPri | | OLM; DongWoo A&E | Junichi Fujisaku; Kentaro Yamaguchi | | |
| April 7 – October 6 | Mission: Yozakura Family | 27 | Silver Link | Mirai Minato | Yozakura-san Chi no Daisakusen | |
| April 7 – February 2, 2025 | Shinkalion: Change the World | 39 | Signal.MD; Production I.G | Kenichiro Komaya | Shinkansen Henkei Robo Shinkarion | |
| April 7 – September 29 | The Fable | 25 | Tezuka Productions | Ryōsuke Takahashi | | |
| April 8 – June 24 | Chillin' in Another World with Level 2 Super Cheat Powers | 12 | J.C.Staff | Yoshiaki Iwasaki | Lv2 kara Cheat datta Moto Yūsha Kōho no Mattari Isekai Life | |
| April 8 – July 1 | Mushoku Tensei: Jobless Reincarnation (season 2, part 2) | 12 | Studio Bind | Ryōsuke Shibuya | Mushoku Tensei II: Isekai Ittara Honki Dasu | |
| April 9 – June 25 | Rinkai! | 12 | TMS Entertainment | Takaaki Ishiyama | | |
| April 9 – June 25 | Tadaima, Okaeri | 12 | Studio Deen | Shinji Ishihira | Tadaima, Okaeri | |
| April 9 – June 25 | Unnamed Memory (season 1) | 12 | ENGI | Kazuya Miura | | |
| April 10 – June 19 | KonoSuba (season 3) | 11 | Drive | Takaomi Kanasaki (Chief); Yujiro Abe | Kono Subarashii Sekai ni Shukufuku o! 3 | |
| April 10 – June 26 | Date A Live V | 12 | Geek Toys | Jun Nakagawa | | |
| April 10 – June 26 | Mysterious Disappearances | 12 | Zero-G | Tomomi Mochizuki | Kaii to Otome to Kamikakushi | |
| April 10 – June 26 | The Many Sides of Voice Actor Radio | 12 | Connect | Hideki Tachibana | Seiyū Radio no Ura Omote | |
| April 10 – July 3 | Oblivion Battery | 12 | MAPPA | Makoto Nakazono | Bōkyaku Battery | |
| April 11 – June 27 | Viral Hit | 12 | Okuruto Noboru | Masakazu Hishida | Kenka Dokugaku | |
| April 12 – July 25 | The Misfit of Demon King Academy (season 2, part 2) | 12 | Silver Link | Shin Oonuma (Chief); Masafumi Tamura | Maō Gakuin no Futekigōsha | |
| April 13 – June 22 | Black Butler: Public School Arc | 11 | CloverWorks | Kenjirou Okada | Kuroshitsuji: Kishuku Gakkō-hen | |
| April 13 – June 29 | Kaiju No. 8 | 12 | Production I.G | Shigeyuki Miya; Tomomi Kamiya | Kaijū 8-gō | |
| April 14 – December 29 | Whisper Me a Love Song | 12 | Cloud Hearts; Yokohama Animation Laboratory | Akira Mano | Sasayaku You ni Koi o Utau | |
| April 14 – June 30 | The New Gate | 12 | Cloud Hearts; Yokohama Animation Laboratory | Tamaki Nakatsu | | |
| May 4 – October 12 | My Hero Academia (season 7) | 21 | Bones | Kenji Nagasaki (Chief); Naomi Nakayama | Boku no Hero Academia 7 | |
| May 12 – June 30 | Demon Slayer: Kimetsu no Yaiba – Hashira Training Arc | 8 | Ufotable | Haruo Sotozaki | Kimetsu no Yaiba: Hashira Geiko-hen | |
| July 2 – September 24 | Shy (season 2) | 12 | Eight Bit | Masaomi Andō | | |
| July 2 – September 17 | My Wife Has No Emotion | 12 | Tezuka Productions | Fumihiro Yoshimura | Boku no Tsuma wa Kanjō ga Nai | |
| July 2 – September 24 | The Ossan Newbie Adventurer, Trained to Death by the Most Powerful Party, Became Invincible | 12 | Yumeta Company | Shin Katagai | Shinmai Ossan Bōkensha, Saikyō Party ni Shinu Hodo Kitaerarete Muteki ni Naru | |
| July 3 – September 18 | Alya Sometimes Hides Her Feelings in Russian | 12 | Doga Kobo | Ryota Itoh | Tokidoki Bosotto Russia-go de Dereru Tonari no Alya-san | |
| July 3 – October 6 | Oshi no Ko (season 2) | 13 | Doga Kobo | Daisuke Hiramaki | | |
| July 3 – December 25 | Tasūketsu: Fate of the Majority | 24 | Satelight | Tatsuo Sato | Tasūketsu | |
| July 3 – September 18 | The Strongest Magician in the Demon Lord's Army Was a Human | 12 | Studio A-Cat | Norihiko Nagahama | Maō-gun Saikyō no Majutsushi wa Ningen Datta | |
| July 4 – September 19 | Days with My Stepsister | 12 | Studio Deen | Souta Ueno | Gimai Seikatsu | |
| July 4 – September 19 | Red Cat Ramen | 12 | E&H Production | Hisatoshi Shimizu | Ramen Aka Neko | |
| July 4 – September 19 | Twilight Out of Focus | 12 | Studio Deen | Toshinori Watanabe | Tasogare Outfocus | |
| July 5 – December 13 | 2.5 Dimensional Seduction | 24 | J.C.Staff | Hideki Okamoto | 2.5-jigen no Lilysa | |
| July 5 – September 27 | Failure Frame: I Became the Strongest and Annihilated Everything with Low-Level Spells | 12 | Seven Arcs | Michio Fukuda | Hazure Waku no "Jōtai Ijō Skill" de Saikyō ni Natta Ore ga Subete o Jūrin Suru made | |
| July 5 – September 20 | I Parry Everything: What Do You Mean I'm the Strongest? I'm Not Even an Adventurer Yet! | 12 | OLM | Dai Fukuyama | Ore wa Subete o "Parry" Suru: Gyaku Kanchigai no Sekai Saikyō wa Bōkensha ni Naritai | |
| July 5 – September 27 | Nier: Automata Ver1.1a (part 2) | 12 | A-1 Pictures | Ryouji Masuyama | | |
| July 5 – September 20 | Pseudo Harem | 12 | Nomad | Toshihiro Kikuchi | Giji Harem | |
| July 5 – September 27 | Senpai Is an Otokonoko | 12 | Project No.9 | Shinsuke Yanagi | Senpai wa Otokonoko | |
| July 5 – September 20 | The Café Terrace and Its Goddesses (season 2) | 12 | Tezuka Productions | Satoshi Kuwabara | Megami no Café Terrace | |
| July 6 – September 21 | A Nobody's Way Up to an Exploration Hero | 12 | Gekkō | Tomoki Kobayashi | Mob kara Hajimaru Tansaku Eiyūtan | |
| July 6 – September 21 | Dahlia in Bloom | 12 | Typhoon Graphics; Imagica Infos | Yōsuke Kubo | Madōgushi Dahlia wa Utsumukanai: Kyō kara Jiyū na Shokunin Life | |
| July 6 – September 28 | Dungeon People | 12 | OLM | Sayaka Yamai | Dungeon no Naka no Hito | |
| July 6 – September 28 | Grendizer U | 13 | Gaina | Mitsuo Fukuda (Chief); Shun Kudō | | |
| July 6 – September 28 | Quality Assurance in Another World | 13 | 100studio; Studio Palette | Kei Umabiki | Kono Sekai wa Fukanzen Sugiru | |
| July 6 – September 28 | Sakuna: Of Rice and Ruin | 13 | P.A. Works | Masayuki Yoshihara | Tensui no Sakuna-hime | |
| July 6 – September 7 | Suicide Squad Isekai | 10 | Wit Studio | Eri Osada | Isekai Suicide Squad | |
| July 6 – September 28 | The Elusive Samurai | 12 | CloverWorks | Yuta Yamazaki | Nige Jōzu no Wakagimi | |
| July 7 – January 5, 2025 | Fairy Tail: 100 Years Quest | 25 | J.C.Staff | Shinji Ishihira (Chief); Toshinori Watanabe | Fairy Tail: 100-nen Quest | |
| July 7 – September 22 | Kinnikuman Perfect Origin Arc | 12 | Production I.G | Akira Sato | Kinnikuman Kanpeki Chо̄jin Shiso-hen | |
| July 7 – September 22 | Head Start at Birth | 12 | | | 0-Saiji Start Dash Monogatari | |
| July 7 – September 15 | Shoshimin: How to Become Ordinary | 10 | Lapin Track | Mamoru Kanbe | Shōshimin Series | |
| July 7 – September 22 | My Deer Friend Nokotan | 12 | Wit Studio | Masahiko Ohta | Shikanoko Nokonoko Koshitantan | |
| July 7 – September 23 | Narenare: Cheer for You! | 12 | P.A. Works | Kōdai Kakimoto | Nanare Hananare | |
| July 7 – September 22 | Plus-Sized Elf | 12 | Elias | Toshikatsu Tokoro | Elf-san wa Yaserarenai | |
| July 7 – December 29 | Tower of God (season 2) | 26 | The Answer Studio | Kazuyoshi Takeuchi (Chief); Akira Suzuki | Kami no Tō | |
| July 7 – September 29 | Wistoria: Wand and Sword | 12 | Actas; Bandai Namco Pictures | Tatsuya Yoshihara | Tsue to Tsurugi no Wistoria | |
| July 8 – September 23 | A Journey Through Another World | 12 | EMT Squared | Atsushi Nigorikawa | Isekai Yururi Kikō: Kosodate Shinagara Bōkensha Shimasu | |
| July 8 – September 23 | Mayonaka Punch | 12 | P.A. Works | Shū Honma | | |
| July 8 – September 23 | VTuber Legend: How I Went Viral After Forgetting to Turn Off My Stream | 12 | TNK | Takuya Asaoka | VTuber Nanda ga Haishin Kiriwasuretara Densetsu ni Natteta | |
| July 9 – September 24 | No Longer Allowed in Another World | 12 | Atelier Pontdarc | Shigeki Kawai | Isekai Shikkaku | |
| July 9 – September 24 | The Magical Girl and the Evil Lieutenant Used to Be Archenemies | 12 | Bones | Akiyo Ohashi | Katsute Mahō Shōjo to Aku wa Tekitai Shiteita | |
| July 10 – September 25 | Love Is Indivisible by Twins | 12 | ROLL2 | Motoki Nakanishi | Koi wa Futago de Warikirenai | |
| July 10 – June 26, 2025 | Our Last Crusade or the Rise of a New World (season 2) | 12 | Silver Link; Studio Palette | Yuki Inaba | Kimi to Boku no Saigo no Senjō, Aruiwa Sekai ga Hajimaru Seisen | |
| July 12 – September 13 | Bye Bye, Earth | 10 | Liden Films | Yasuto Nishikata | | |
| July 13 – September 28 | Why Does Nobody Remember Me in This World? | 12 | Project No.9 | Tatsuma Minamikawa | Naze Boku no Sekai wo Dare mo Oboeteinainoka? | |
| July 14 – October 6 | Atri: My Dear Moments | 13 | Troyca | Makoto Katō | | |
| July 14 – September 29 | Too Many Losing Heroines! | 12 | A-1 Pictures | Shōtarō Kitamura | Make Heroine ga Ōsugiru! | |
| July 18 – December 26 | Sengoku Youko (part 2) | 22 | White Fox | Masahiro Aizawa | Sengoku Yōko | |
| August 8 – November 28 | Delico's Nursery | 13 | J.C.Staff | Hiroshi Nishikiori | | |
| August 16 – October 18 | Rick and Morty: The Anime | 10 | Telecom Animation Film | Takashi Sano | | |
| September 29 – December 22 | As a Reincarnated Aristocrat, I'll Use My Appraisal Skill to Rise in the World (season 2) | 12 | Studio Mother | Takao Kato | Tensei Kizoku, Kantei Skill de Nariagaru | |
| September 29 – October 20 | Uzumaki | 4 | Fugaku | Hiroshi Nagahama | | |
| October 1 – December 24 | I'll Become a Villainess Who Goes Down in History | 13 | Maho Film | Yūji Yanase | Rekishi ni Nokoru Akujo ni Naru zo | |
| October 1 – December 24 | Let This Grieving Soul Retire! | 13 | Zero-G | Masahiro Takata | Nageki no Bōrei wa Intai Shitai | |
| October 2 – December 18 | Acro Trip | 12 | Voil | Ayumu Kotake | | |
| October 2 – March 26, 2025 | Re:Zero − Starting Life in Another World (season 3) | 16 | White Fox | Masahiro Shinohara | Re:Zero kara Hajimeru Isekai Seikatsu | |
| October 2 – March 26, 2025 | Tying the Knot with an Amagami Sister | 24 | Drive | Yujiro Abe | Amagami-san Chi no Enmusubi | |
| October 3 – December 19 | 365 Days to the Wedding | 12 | Ashi Productions | Hiroshi Ikehata | Kekkon Surutte, Hontō desu ka? | |
| October 3 – March 27, 2025 | Blue Box | 25 | Telecom Animation Film | Yuichiro Yano | Ao no Hako | |
| October 3 – December 19 | KamiErabi God.app (season 2) | 12 | Unend | Hiroyuki Seshita | Kamierabi | |
| October 3 – December 19 | Kinokoinu: Mushroom Pup | 12 | C-Station | Kagetoshi Asano | Kinoko Inu | |
| October 3 – December 19 | Negative Positive Angler | 12 | NUT | Yutaka Uemura | Negapoji Angurā | |
| October 3 – December 26 | The Prince of Tennis II: U-17 World Cup Semifinal | 13 | M.S.C | Yoshinobu Tokumoto | Shin Tennis no Ōji-sama U-17 World Cup Semifinal | |
| October 3 –December 20 | Trillion Game | 13 | Madhouse | Yūzō Satō | | |
| October 4 –December 19 | Dandadan | 12 | Science Saru | Fūga Yamashiro | | |
| October 4 – December 20 | Hamidashi Creative | 12 | Hayabusa Film | Hisayoshi Hirasawa (Chief); Shige Fukase | Hamidashi Kurieitibu | |
| October 4 – December 12 | Loner Life in Another World | 12 | Hayabusa Film; Passione | Akio Kazumi | Hitoribotchi no Isekai Kōryaku | |
| October 4 – December 20 | Magilumiere Magical Girls Inc. | 12 | Studio Moe; J.C.Staff | Masahiro Hiraoka | Kabushiki Gaisha Magilumiere | |
| October 4 – December 20 | Mechanical Arms | 12 | TriF Studio | Sae Okamoto | Mecha-Ude | |
| October 4 – March 21, 2025 | Rurouni Kenshin: Kyoto Disturbance | 23 | Liden Films | Hideyo Yamamoto | Rurouni Kenshin Meiji Kenkaku Romantan: Kyoto Dōran | |
| October 5 – December 28 | Bleach: Thousand-Year Blood War (part 3) | 14 | Pierrot Films | Tomohisa Taguchi (Chief); Hikaru Murata | Bleach: Sennen Kessen-hen | |
| October 5 – December 28 | Blue Lock vs. U-20 Japan | 14 | Eight Bit | Yūji Haibara (Chief); Shintarō Inokawa | Burū Rokku | |
| October 5 – December 21 | Demon Lord, Retry! R | 12 | Gekkō | Kazuomi Koga | Maō-sama, Retry! R | |
| October 5 – December 21 | How I Attended an All-Guy's Mixer | 12 | Ashi Productions | Kazuomi Koga | Gōkon ni Ittara Onna ga Inakatta Hanashi | |
| October 5 – March 7, 2025 | Is It Wrong to Try to Pick Up Girls in a Dungeon? (season 5) | 15 | J.C.Staff | Hideki Tachibana | Dungeon ni Deai o Motomeru no wa Machigatteiru Darō ka | |
| October 5 – March 15, 2025 | Orb: On the Movements of the Earth | 25 | Madhouse | Kenichi Shimizu | Chi: Chikyū no Undō ni Tsuite | |
| October 5 – December 21 | Sword Art Online Alternative: Gun Gale Online (season 2) | 12 | A-1 Pictures | Masayuki Sakoi | | |
| October 5 – December 21 | The Idolmaster Shiny Colors (season 2) | 12 | Polygon Pictures | Mankyū; Takeshi Iwata | | |
| October 5 – December 21 | The Stories of Girls Who Couldn't Be Magicians | 12 | J.C.Staff | Takashi Watanabe (Chief); Masato Matsune | Mahō Tsukai ni Narenakatta Onna no Ko no Hanashi | |
| October 5 – April 5, 2025 | Tōhai | 25 | East Fish Studio | Jun Hatori | | |
| October 5 – January 4, 2025 | Tonbo! (season 2) | 13 | OLM | Jin Gu Oh | Ōi! Tonbo | |
| October 6 – March 23, 2025 | Blue Exorcist: Beyond the Snow Saga | 24 | Studio VOLN | Daisuke Yoshida | Ao no Exorcist: Yuki no Hate-hen | |
| October 6 – | Kagaku x Bouken Survival! | 21 | Gallop | Masahiro Hosoda | | |
| October 6 – December 22 | Love Live! Superstar!! (season 3) | 12 | Bandai Namco Filmworks | Takahiko Kyogoku | Rabu Raibu! Sūpāsutā!! | |
| October 6 – December 23 | MF Ghost (season 2) | 12 | Felix Film | Tomohito Naka | MF Gōsuto | |
| October 6 – December 22 | Murai in Love | 12 | J.C.Staff | Yoshiki Yamakawa | Murai no Koi | |
| October 6 – December 23 | Puniru Is a Cute Slime | 12 | Toho Animation Studio | Yūshi Ibe | Puniru wa Kawaii Slime | |
| October 6 – | PuniRunes Puni 2 | | OLM Digital | Kunihiko Yuyama (Chief); Hiroshi Ikehata | | |
| October 6 – December 22 | Ranma ½ | 12 | MAPPA | Kōnosuke Uda | Ranma Nibun-no-Ichi | |
| October 6 – December 22 | The Healer Who Was Banished From His Party, Is, in Fact, the Strongest | 12 | Studio Elle | Keisuke Ōnishi | Party kara Tsuihō Sareta Sono Chiyushi, Jitsu wa Saikyō ni Tsuki | |
| October 6 – December 29 | The Seven Deadly Sins: Four Knights of the Apocalypse (season 2) | 12 | Telecom Animation Film | Maki Odaira | Nanatsu no Taizai: Mokushiroku no Yon-kishi | |
| October 6 – December 22 | TsumaSho | 12 | Studio Signpost | Noriyuki Abe | Tsuma, Shōgakusei ni Naru | |
| October 6 – December 22 | You Are Ms. Servant | 12 | Felix Film | Ayumu Watanabe | Kimi wa Meido-sama | |
| October 7 – October 28 | After School Hanako-kun (season 2) | 4 | Lerche | Masaki Kitamura | Hōkago Shōnen Hanako-kun | |
| October 7 – September 26, 2025 | Haigakura | 13 | Typhoon Graphics | Junichi Yamamoto | | |
| October 7 – September 8, 2025 | Neko ni Tensei Shita Oji-san | 48 | Studio Eight Colors | Rio; Takahiro Kawakoshi | | |
| October 7 – December 30 | Ron Kamonohashi's Forbidden Deductions (season 2) | 13 | Diomedéa | Shōta Ihata | Kamonohashi Ron no Kindan Suiri | |
| October 7 – December 23 | The Most Notorious "Talker" Runs the World's Greatest Clan | 12 | Felix Film; GA-CREW | Yuta Takamura | Saikyō no Shienshoku "Wajutsushi" dearu Ore wa Sekai Saikyō Clan o Shitagaeru | |
| October 7 – December 23 | Yakuza Fiancé: Raise wa Tanin ga Ii | 12 | Studio Deen | Toshifumi Kawase | Raise wa Tanin ga Ii | |
| October 8 – March 25, 2025 | A Terrified Teacher at Ghoul School! | 24 | Satelight | Katsumi Ono | Yōkai Gakkō no Sensei Hajimemashita! | |
| October 8 – December 24 | Natsume's Book of Friends (season 7) | 12 | Shuka | Takahiro Omori (Chief); Hideki Ito | Natsume Yūjin-chō Shichi | |
| October 8 – December 24 | Seirei Gensouki: Spirit Chronicles (season 2) | 12 | TMS Entertainment | Osamu Yamasaki (Chief); Hiroshi Kubo | Seirei Gensōki | |
| October 9 – December 25 | The Do-Over Damsel Conquers the Dragon Emperor | 12 | J.C.Staff | Kentarō Suzuki | Yarinaoshi Reijō wa Ryūtei Heika o Kōryaku-chū | |
| October 10 – December 24 | Nina the Starry Bride | 12 | Signal.MD | Kenichiro Komaya | Hoshifuru Ōkoku no Nina | |
| October 10 – March 28, 2025 | Tono to Inu | 24 | OLM; Live2D Creative Studio | Haruki Kasugamori | | |
| October 11 – February 28, 2025 | Dragon Ball Daima | 20 | Toei Animation | Yoshitaka Yashima; Aya Komaki | | |
| October 11 – December 27 | Goodbye, Dragon Life | 12 | SynergySP; Vega Entertainment | Kenichi Nishida | Sayonara Ryūsei, Konnichiwa Jinsei | |
| October 13 – December 29 | Demon Lord 2099 | 12 | J.C.Staff | Ryō Andō | Maō 2099 | |
| October 13 – March 30, 2025 | Shangri-La Frontier (season 2) | 25 | C2C | Toshiyuki Kubooka | Shangri-La Frontier: Kusogē Hunter, Kamigē ni Idomantosu | |
| October 14 – February 17, 2025 | Arifureta: From Commonplace to World's Strongest (season 3) | 16 | Asread | Akira Iwanaga | Arifureta Shokugyō de Sekai Saikyō | |
| October 19 – March 29, 2025 | Blue Miburo | 24 | Maho Film | Kumiko Habara | Ao no Miburo | |
| November 14 – December 26 | Murder Mystery of the Dead | 6 | Ziine Studio | Tomohiro Ishii | | |

=== Original net animations ===
A list of original net animations that debuted between January 1 and December 31, 2024.

| First run start and end dates | Title | Episodes | Studio | Director(s) | Original title | Ref. |
|---|---|---|---|---|---|---|
| January 21 | Monsters: 103 Mercies Dragon Damnation | 1 | E&H Production | Sunghoo Park | Monsters: Ippaku Sanjō Hiryū Jigoku | |
| January 25 | Chikomaru | 1 | Pie in the sky | Haruka Suzuki | | |
| February 23 – March 15 | Great Pretender: Razbliuto | 4 | Wit Studio | Hiro Kaburagi | | |
| March 20 – May 1 | Sand Land: The Series | 13 | Sunrise; Kamikaze Douga; Anima | Toshihisa Yokoshima | | |
| April 1 – | Rokurō no Dai Bōken | | Planet Studio | Tsutomu Yabuki | | |
| April 17 | The Grimm Variations | 6 | Wit Studio | Various | Grimm Kumikyoku | |
| April 25 – July 18 | Mahjong Soul Kan!! | 13 | Alke | Kazuomi Koga | Jantama Kan!! | |
| May 2 – July 17 | Time Patrol Bon | 24 | Bones | Masahiro Ando | | |
| May 23 | Garouden: The Way of the Lone Wolf | 8 | NAZ | Atsushi Ikariya | | |
| May 24 – September 20 | Dead Dead Demon's Dededede Destruction (series edition) | 18 | Production +h. | Tomoyuki Kurokawa | | |
| June 6 | Baki Hanma vs. Kengan Ashura | 1 | TMS Entertainment | Toshiki Hirano | Hanma Baki vs Kengan Ashura | |
| June 22 – August 6 | Rising Impact | 26 | Lay-duce | Hitoshi Nanba | | |
| July 6 – October 19 | Monogatari Series Off & Monster Season | 14 | Shaft | Akiyuki Shinbo (Chief); Midori Yoshizawa | | |
| July 19 | Chi's Sweet Summer Vacation | 12 | Marza Animation Planet | Kiminori Kusano | Koneko no Chi: Ponponra Natsuyasumi | |
| August 1 | Kimi ni Todoke (season 3) | 5 | Production I.G | Kenichi Matsuzawa | | |
| August 15 | Kengan Ashura (season 2, part 2) | 16 | Larx Entertainment | Seiji Kishi | | |
| August 29 | Terminator Zero | 8 | Production I.G | Masashi Kudō | | |
| October 4 – November 29 | Duel Masters Lost: Tsuioku no Suishō | 4 | J.C.Staff | Riki Fukushima | | |
| October 17 | Gundam: Requiem for Vengeance | 6 | Sunrise; SAFEHOUSE | Erasmus Brosdau | Kidō Senshi Gundam: Fukushū no Requiem | |
| December 4 – | Nights with a Cat (season 3) | | Studio Puyukai | Minoru Ashina | Yoru wa Neko to Issho | |
| December 5 | Beastars (season 3, part 1) | | Orange | Shinichi Matsumi | | |
| December 21 – | Duel Masters Lost: Gekka no Shinigami | | J.C.Staff | Riki Fukushima | | |

=== Original video animations ===
A list of original video animations that debuted between January 1 and December 31, 2024.

| First run start and end dates | Title | Episodes | Studio | Director(s) | Original title | Ref. |
|---|---|---|---|---|---|---|
| March 15 | My Happy Marriage | 1 | Kinema Citrus | Takehiro Kubota | Watashi no Shiawase na Kekkon | |
| April 1 | Shin Yaranai ka | 1 | Anime Tokyo; Studio Kingyoiro | Pierre Itō | | |

== Deaths ==
=== January ===
- January 2: William Samples, Canadian voice actor (voice of Taihei Hiraga in Master Keaton, additional voices in Project ARMS and Inuyasha).
- January 12: Haruo Takahashi, Japanese animator (GeGeGe no Kitarō, Tensai Bakabon, Lupin the Third, Ringing Bell) and manga creator, dies at age 76.
- January 25: Tomohiro Marukawa, Japanese manga creator (The World of Narue), dies from ischemic heart disease at age 53.

=== February ===
- February 1: Greg Finley, American voice actor (voice of Captain Gloval and Anatole Leonard in the Robotech franchise, and Victor Frankenstein in Kyoufu Densetsu Kaiki! Frankenstein), director, and writer, dies at age 76.
- February 8: Bon Ishihara, Japanese voice actor (voice of the Gold-toothed Doctor in Fullmetal Alchemist: Brotherhood, Johnny the Matagi in Samurai Champloo, Sōichirō Shimogamo in The Eccentric Family, Alexandre Bucock in Legend of the Galactic Heroes: Die Neue These, and Kenichi Yamamoto in Shingu: Secret of the Stellar Wars), dies at age 68.
- February 27: Masaaki Maeda, Japanese actor (voice of Carozzo "Iron Mask" Ronah in Mobile Suit Gundam F91), dies from ischemic heart failure at age 91.

=== March ===
- March 1: Akira Toriyama, Japanese manga creator (Dr. Slump, Dragon Ball), dies from acute subdural hematoma at age 68.
- March 8: Tarako, Japanese voice actress (voice of Momoko Sakura in Chibi Maruko-chan, Kirara in Inuyasha, Madge in Castle in the Sky), dies at age 63.
- March 10: Mutsumi Inomata, Japanese illustrator (Utsunomiko, The Weathering Continent) and character designer (Future GPX Cyber Formula, Plawres Sanshiro), dies at age 63.
- March 14: Minori Terada, Japanese voice actor (voice of Colonel Muska in Castle in the Sky), dies at age 81.

=== April ===
- April 6: Dave Underwood, American voice actor (voice of Chief in You're Under Arrest, Talos in Crusher Joe, Akai in Kite, Iga in Blue Submarine No. 6) dies at age 57.
- April 8: Osamu Sōda, Japanese novelist (Bokura no Nanokakan Sensō), dies at age 95 from pneumonia.
- April 11: Yasuo Muramatsu, Japanese voice actor (voice of Tom in One Piece, Pisco in Case Closed, Revil in Mobile Suit Gundam), and founder of Office Kaoru, dies at age 91.
- April 15:
  - Takaaki Seki, Japanese voice actor (voice of Shutaro Kiba in Mōryō no Hako, Zhang Fei in Sōten Kōro, Onizuka in Gallery Fake, Mattis in Ronja, the Robber's Daughter), dies at age 54 from esophegal cancer.
  - Reita, Japanese bassist for the band the GazettE (performed theme song for Black Butler II), dies at age 42.
- April 18: Keiko Yamamoto, Japanese voice actress (voice of Shōta Yamada in Chibi Maruko-chan, Hanako Hanazawa in Sazae-san, Bakabon in Tensai Bakabon, Choromatsu in Osomatsu-kun (1966), Sunakake Baba in the Gegege no Kitaro franchise, Kinkotsu-Obaba and Nachiguron in the Kinnikuman franchise), dies at age 83 from sepsis.

=== May ===
- May 17: Hideyuki Umezu, Japanese voice actor (voice of Diamante in One Piece, Ian Vashti in Mobile Suit Gundam 00, GP02 in Mobile Suit SD Gundam Festival), dies at age 68 from interstitial pneumonia.
- May 20: Eiko Masuyama, Japanese voice actress (voice of Fujiko Mine in Lupin the Third franchise, Honey Kisaragi in Cutie Honey, Mama in Tensai Bakabon, Chappy in Mahōtsukai Chappy, Lady Iyo in Ikkyū-san, Sumire Hoshino / Paako in Perman (1983)), dies at age 89 from pneumonia.
- May 30: Akira Shigino, Japanese animation director (Osomatsu-kun, Dino Girl Gauko, Crayon Shin-chan: Roar! Kasukabe Animal Kingdom, Crayon Shin-chan: Super-Dimension! The Storm Called My Bride, Nanako SOS, Chō Kōsoku Galvion), dies at age 70 from bile duct cancer.

=== June ===
- June 8: Keisuke Yamashita, Japanese voice actor (voice of Dan Araiso in Reideen the Brave, Hiss in Space Battleship Yamato and Space Battleship Yamato, Kazuhiko Sugiyama and Jirō Nōmura in Space Battleship Yamato, Gaulois in Tico of the Seven Seas, Goro in UFO Warrior Dai Apolon), dies at age 83.
- June 16: Hiroyuki Omori, Japanese producer (JoJo's Bizarre Adventure series), dies at age 57.
- June 19: Katsue Miwa, Japanese voice actress (voice of Mitsuo Suwa/Perman No. 1 in Perman, Unico in The Fantastic Adventures of Unico and Unico in the Island of Magic, Hirame Hirayama in Jarinko Chie, Shōta Ōhara in Obake no Q-Tarō, Fukusuke in Robot Carnival), dies at age 80 from pulmonary embolism.
- June 26: Taiki Matsuno, Japanese voice actor (voice of Hajime Kindaichi in The File of Young Kindaichi, Kōga in Inuyasha, Jun Manjōme in Yu-Gi-Oh! GX, Pegasus/Helios in Sailor Moon SuperS, Agumon in Digimon Data Squad, Tart in Fresh Pretty Cure!), dies at age 56 from right cerebral haemorrhage.

=== July ===
- July 10: Tom Wyner, American voice actor (voice of Devimon in Digimon Adventure and Digimon Adventure 02, narrator in Digimon Adventure 02, M. Bison in Street Fighter II: The Animated Movie and the Animaze dub of Street Fighter II V), dies at age 77.
- July 12: Noriko Ohara, Japanese voice actress (voice of Nobita Nobi in the Doraemon (1979) franchise, Conan in Future Boy Conan, Doronjo in the Yatterman franchise, Peter in Heidi, Girl of the Alps, Hiyoshi Goh and Ri Katherine in Voltes V, Claudia LaSalle in the Macross franchise, Oyuki in Urusei Yatsura (1981)), dies at age 88 from an illness.
- July 13: James B. Sikking, American actor and voice actor (voice of Seiya Tsukishima in Whisper of the Heart), dies at age 90 from complications from dementia.
- July 14: Shiro Yadama, Japanese creator (Fair, then Partly Piggy), dies at age 80.
- July 22: Nobuhiro Sakata, Japanese manga creator (Dan Doh!!), dies at age 76.

=== August ===
- August 10: Rachael Lillis, American voice actress (voice of Misty and Jessie in Pokémon franchise, Utena Tenjo in Revolutionary Girl Utena, Micott Bartsch in Mobile Suit Gundam Unicorn, Yuriko Star in The Irresponsible Captain Tylor, Martina in Slayers Next, Kanaka Ohno in Genshiken, Ami Kurimoto in DNA²), dies at age 55 from breast cancer.
- August 20: Atsuko Tanaka, Japanese voice actress (voice of Motoko Kusanagi in Ghost in the Shell, Konan in Naruto, Lisa Lisa in JoJo's Bizarre Adventure), dies at age 61 from an illness.

=== September ===
- September 2: Toshiyuki Manabe, Japanese voice actor (voice of man and zombie in Hensuki), dies at age 32 from heart failure.
- September 8: Emi Shinohara, Japanese voice actress (voice of Makoto Kino/Sailor Jupiter in Sailor Moon, Kushina Uzumaki in Naruto: Shippuden, Kaho Mizuki in Cardcaptor Sakura, B-ko Daitokuji in Project A-ko), dies at age 61 from an illness.
- September 15: Yukihiro Shibutani, Japanese animator (art director for Natsume's Book of Friends, Patlabor, Case Closed, Key the Metal Idol, Sakura Wars, Kamichu!, Big Windup!, Whispered Words, Godzilla: Planet of the Monsters, Godzilla: City on the Edge of Battle, Godzilla: The Planet Eater, Rascal Does Not Dream of Bunny Girl Senpai, Fly Me to the Moon, To Your Eternity, The Yuzuki Family's Four Sons, An Archdemon's Dilemma: How to Love Your Elf Bride) dies at age 63.
- September 20: Sayuri, Japanese singer (performed ending theme songs for Rampo Kitan: Game of Laplace, Erased, Scum's Wish, Fate/Extra Last Encore, My Hero Academia, Edens Zero, Lycoris Recoil), dies at age 28.
- September 29: Nobuyo Ōyama, Japanese voice actress (voice of Doraemon in Doraemon (1979), Katsuo Isono in Sazae-san, Hazedon in Hazedon, Kappei Jin in Invincible Super Man Zambot 3, Monokuma in Danganronpa: The Animation), dies at age 90 from dementia.
- Date unknown: Shinsuke Kurihashi, Japanese manga creator (artist for Infinite Ryvius manga adaptation).

=== October ===
- October 5: Doc Harris, Canadian voice actor (narrated for the Ocean Productions English dub of Dragon Ball Z), dies at age 76.
- October 13: Shigemi Ikeda, Japanese animator (art director for My Hero Academia, Overlord, Gundam, Afro Samurai, Gantz), dies at age 69.
- October 14: Rieko Nakagawa, Japanese author and lyricist (wrote lyrics for songs in My Neighbor Totoro), dies at age 89.
- October 17: Toshiyuki Nishida, Japanese actor and voice actor (voice of Iwa in A Letter to Momo and Kōichi Tabuchi in Ganbare!! Tabuchi-kun!!, portrayed Hikozaemon Tokugawa in Space Battleship Yamato), dies at age 76.
- October 21: Noboru Kimura, Japanese singer (lead vocalist of TALIZMAN, performed theme songs for Ultraman, Barefoot Gen, Lupin the 3rd Part II, Thunderbirds 2086, Sugata Sanshiro, Mirai Keisatsu Urashiman), is announced to have died at the age of 76.
- October 23: Ryō Kōno, Japanese art director (Space Dandy, Mob Psycho 100, Paradise Kiss, Cardcaptor Sakura Movie 2: The Sealed Card), dies from suspected gastrointestinal bleeding.
- October 28: Kazuo Umezu, Japanese manga creator (Cat Eyed Boy, Makoto-chan), dies at age 88.

=== November ===
- November 6:
  - Michie Kita, Japanese voice actress (voice of Nello in Dog of Flanders, Doronpa in Obake no Q-Tarō, Franz Charming in Princess Knight, Nobuhiko Ōbayashi in Don Dracula), dies at age 89.
  - Hiroki Ikeshita, Japanese animator (assistant director for Shangri-La Frontier, Handyman Saitou in Another World, Hitori Bocchi no Marumaru Seikatsu, director of Shachibato! President, It's Time for Battle!), dies at age 47.
- November 12: Eiji Yanagisawa, Japanese voice actor (voice of Danroku in Getter Robo Armageddon, Takayanagi in Genshiken, Genzō in Naruto, Okabe-sensei in The Melancholy of Haruhi Suzumiya, Gunbiker and Zapper Zaku in SD Gundam Force), dies at age 57 from brainstem haemorrhage.
- November 13:
  - Dan Hennessey, American voice actor and voice director (voice directed English dubs of Air Master, Power Stone, Slam Dunk, Interlude, Saint Seiya), dies at age 83 from complications of Parkinson's disease.
  - Shuntarō Tanikawa, Japanese poet and translator (wrote lyrics for Astro Boy, Howl's Moving Castle, Phoenix, Big X), dies at age 92.
- November 14: Shōhei Hino, Japanese actor (voice of Granduncle in The Boy and the Heron), dies at age 75.
- November 18: Junko Hori, Japanese voice actress (voice of the titular characters in Ninja Hattori-kun, Chimpui, Cat Eyed Boy, Ikasama in Gamba no Bouken, Annie in Little Lulu and Her Little Friends, Mack the Stray Dog in Gulliver's Travels Beyond the Moon, Zanelli in Night on the Galactic Railroad), dies at age 89 from dementia.
- November 24: Yōji Kuri, Japanese cartoonist and author (Gokiburi-chan, Clap Vocalism, Au Fou!) dies at age 96.

=== December ===
- December 3: Jan Scott-Frazier, American animator, producer and translator, dies at age 59.
- December 11: Michio Mamiya, Japanese composer (The Great Adventure of Horus, Prince of the Sun, Gauche the Cellist, Grave of the Fireflies), dies at age 95 from pneumonia.
