= The Misfit of Demon King Academy season 1 =

2020 Japanese anime series

The Misfit of Demon King Academy
- Season 1
- Promotional poster for the first season
- No. of episodes: 13

Release
- Original network: Tokyo MX
- Original release: July 4 – September 26, 2020

Season chronology
- Next → Season 2

The Misfit of Demon King Academy is an anime television series based on the light novel series of the same title written by Shu and illustrated by Yoshinori Shizuma. The adaptation was announced at the "Dengeki Bunko Aki no Namahōsō Festival" event on October 6, 2019. The anime was originally set to premiere in April 2020, but it was delayed until July 2020 due to production complications resulting from the COVID-19 pandemic. The series was animated by Silver Link and directed by Masafumi Tamura, with Shin Oonuma serving as chief director. Jin Tanaka handled the series composition, while Kazuyuki Yamayoshi designed the characters, and Keiji Inai composed the music. The 13-episode anime aired from July 4 to September 26, 2020. Civilian performed the opening theme "Seikai Fuseikai" (正解不正解; "Correct Incorrect"), while Tomori Kusunoki performed the ending theme "Hamidashimono" (ハミダシモノ). Crunchyroll streamed the series. On September 4, 2020, Aniplex of America announced that the series would receive an English dub, which premiered the following day.

== Episodes ==
No. overall	No. in season	Title (Note: English translated titles are taken from Crunchyroll.)	Directed by	Written by	Storyboarded by	Original release date	Ref.
1	1	"The Misfit of Demon King Academy"; Transliteration: "Maō Gakuin no Futekigōsha" (Japanese: 魔王学院の不適合者)	Masafumi Tamura	Jin Tanaka	Masafumi Tamura	July 4, 2020	
In present day demon society, the Delzogade Demon King Academy trains young demons descended from the Demon King's bloodline, waiting for the Demon King to reincarnate. Two new students, Anos Voldigoad and Misha Necron, are bullied by Zepes Indu, an arrogant royal. Anos, who is secretly the reincarnated Demon King, easily humiliates him by repeatedly killing and resurrecting Zepes until he surrenders. Anos invites Misha to his home, where it is explained by Anos' parents that he used his magic to rapidly age. Anos is accosted by Zepes and his brother, Leorig, who explains that nobles and royals ensure their supremacy by secretly murdering any hybrids born with powerful magic. Leorig then murders Zepes for humiliating the family. However, Anos is unaffected by Leorig's magic, explaining that as their founding ancestor, he is the origin of their magic. He then defeats Leorig by summoning Zepes as a vengeful zombie. Victorious, Anos fully resurrects Zepes and Leorig and declares he will retake his throne as Demon King. The next day, Anos receives his student crest which identifies him as the most powerful new student, but also a total misfit.
2	2	"The Witch of Destruction"; Transliteration: "Hametsu no Majo" (Japanese: 破滅の魔女)	Junya Koshiba	Jin Tanaka	Masayoshi Nishida	July 11, 2020	
2,000 years ago, Anos, tired of war, made a deal with the human hero Kanon to sacrifice his life to separate the Demon, Human, Spirit and God realms for 1,000 years so peace could flourish. In the present, Anos learns he was deemed a misfit because the history of the Demon King has been grossly misinterpreted. He proves his intelligence by correcting the spell of his teacher, Emilia Ludowell, doubling its power. He then proves his power by overwhelming Sasha Necron, Misha's arrogant sister, with her own spell. Sasha challenges Anos to a duel in the team exam. If Sasha loses, she will join Anos' team, but if Anos loses, he becomes her slave. Anos easily wins using his immense physical strength and overwhelming magic. After Sasha unwillingly agrees to join his team, Anos reveals he went easy on her because Misha loves Sasha and wanted to be on the same team as her, plus he thinks Sasha's demon eyes are beautiful. After introducing Sasha to his parents, who are shocked he brought two girls home, Sasha secretly thanks Anos for helping her reconcile her difficult relationship with Misha, and kisses him.
3	3	"Sasha's True Intentions"; Transliteration: "Sāsha no Shin'i" (Japanese: サーシャの真意)	Yamato Ouchi	Jin Tanaka	Hiroyuki Shimazu	July 18, 2020	
Ivis Necron, one of the seven Elder Demon Emperors Anos created from his blood, now runs the academy as the seven deans. Anos realizes Ivis does not remember him, so he attempts to sends Ivis back in time to retrieve his memories. However, Ivis decides to remain neutral. For the next academy challenge, students are told to collect magic items from a castle which is actually Anos' home from 2,000 years ago. He decides to collect a scepter at the lowest level. After collecting the scepter, he allows Misha to take one of his personal items, the Phoenix Robe, for Sasha's birthday to enhance her flame magic. However, Sasha stabs Misha and claims she was never their ally, but was waiting for a chance to betray them. Anos claims she is lying since her demonic eyes should have activated under intense emotion, but they did not. Sasha flees with the robe and scepter, claiming she hates Misha. Misha admits to Anos that she will disappear the moment she and Sasha turn 15 and that the person he thinks of as Misha does not actually exist.
4	4	"15th Birthday"; Transliteration: "Jū go no Tanjōbi" (Japanese: 十五の誕生日)	Yūsuke Sekine	Jin Tanaka	Masafumi Tamura	July 25, 2020	
When Sasha was a fetus, Ivis split her into two babies so when they turn 15, they would fuse into a single more powerful demon. Anos catches up with Sasha who reveals she actually wants to save Misha. Anos reveals that if he sends them back in time, they can fuse with their unborn fetuses so they will be born as true twin sisters. Anos is then stabbed by Ivis. Anos activates the time spell only to be blocked by Eugo La Raviaz, Guardian God of Time. Fusing himself with Ivis, he seemingly kills Anos. However, Anos reappears unharmed. He sends Sasha and Misha to fuse with their unborn selves. He then destroys Ivis. After resurrecting Ivis, Anos returns all his unaltered memories, revealing Ivis only betrayed him because his memories had been altered by someone working for Avos Dilhevia. Sasha and Misha return, now as true sisters. Despite having saved Misha and altering the past, Anos nonchalantly decides to return his scepter to get a perfect score for the academy challenge. He also gives Misha a ring from his collection to enhance her magic, along with the Phoenix Robe he gave to Sasha.
5	5	"The Transfer Student"; Transliteration: "Ten'nyūsei" (Japanese: 転入生)	Yoshifumi Sueda	Tamaho Ouchi	Yoshifumi Sueda	August 1, 2020	
In the past, a swordsman, Shin Reglia, won a great victory for Anos and was granted the ability to reincarnate. In the present, Emilia announces that a royal student famous for his sword skills is transferring into the academy. Misa Ilioroagu, a classmate, informs Anos she is a Unitarian. Anos is intrigued to learn Melheis Boran, another Elder Demon Emperor, is a Unitarian. Anos learns Misa's royal father has not spoken to her in years. Anos decides to let Misa and her Unitarian classmates join his team if they prove themselves. The academy begins magic sword lessons where Anos and the transfer student, Lay Glanzudlii, are the only ones strong enough to wield magic swords. Lay asks to join Anos' team, disregarding his own royal status. Anos refuses and tells Lay and Misa to challenge him in the next team exam duel. Misha and Sasha defeat Misa and the Unitarians. Anos holds his own against Lay using just a tree branch while Lay starts to remember having dueled Anos before. Anos finally claims victory and suspects Lay is the reincarnation of someone from his former life. Lay promises to defeat Anos at their next duel.
6	6	"Magic Sword Tournament"; Transliteration: "Maken Taikai" (Japanese: 魔剣大会)	Jun Fukuda	Tamaho Ouchi	Masayoshi Nishida	August 8, 2020	
After the duel, Anos invites Lay and Misa to his home along with Sasha and Misha for dinner. There, he welcomes Lay and Misa in his team, while his parents enthusiastically celebrate his victory. At school, Emilia announces that two students have been chosen as competitors for the magic sword tournament: Lay and Anos. Anos suspects there is some kind of ulterior motive. Later, Anos meets Melheis Boran, one of the Seven Elder Demon Emperors, who claims that while he believes that his memories were erased at some point, he is confident Anos is the Demon King of Tyranny. To show his gratitude to Misha, Anos takes her on an outing. During the outing, Ivis, using the disguise of a café cat, tells Anos that someone above Melheis is actually in control of the Unitarians. On the day of the tournament, Ivis tells Anos some more information that he has uncovered. As such, Anos decides to not participate. However, after he realizes how much his parents believe in him, Anos changes his mind and takes on the previous tournament's winner, Krut Ludowell.
7	7	"Mother's Words"; Transliteration: "Haha no Kotoba" (Japanese: 母の言葉)	Masafumi Tamura	Tamaho Ouchi	Masafumi Tamura	August 15, 2020	
Anos easily defeats Krut, which angers Emilia. This is followed by Lay winning his match. Backstage, Anos and Lay confront each other where Anos notices something is wrong. After he wins his next match, Anos gives his mother his sword. He and Misa then head to the hospital. There, they meet Lay's adoptive mother, Sheila, who has Spirit disease. She reveals Lay is being controlled by the Royalists. Afterwards, Misa volunteers to help her. Meanwhile, Emilia attacks Anos' mother and the Unitarian classmates when they refuse to give her the sword. When Anos arrives, he freezes Emilia then heals all the girls and his mother. He angrily teleports Emilia to the arena where he stabs her with a sword before he kills her. He then resurrects her as a hybrid in order to punish her for her prejudice. Back at the hospital, Lay stops Misa to protect her life force. He then has a conversation with Sheila where she tells him to live his life the way he wants to. Lay leaves before Anos can return. The next day, Anos and Lay face each other in the finals.
8	8	"The Final Duel"; Transliteration: "Futari no Kesshōsen" (Japanese: 二人の決勝戦)	Junya Koshiba	Tamaho Ouchi	Mizuka Saito	August 22, 2020	
Before the duel commences, special rules are implemented which impact both Lay and Sheila. Lay praises Anos for his ability to fight despite his magic being drained. However, he decides to fight on his own terms, which allows them to go all out. Ultimately, Anos is victorious. It is then revealed that Melheis was the mastermind behind the tournament. Anos is challenged by Melheis, Gaios Anzem, and Ydol Anzeo. However, Lay takes out Gaios and Ydol. When confronted, Melheis reveals he has Sheila, which causes Lay to leave the Dimensional Prison to save her. A confident Melheis heads to an Absolute Space where he attacks Anos and Lay. Sheila becomes a sword, which Lay uses to slash the Absolute Space. Anos then confronts a stunned Melheis where he frees him from his brainwashing. Returning to the arena, Anos is declared the winner of the tournament. After healing Lay, Anos resurrects Sheila, revealing her true form was a sword. Afterwards, Sasha gives Anos a sword as a commemorative gift.
9	9	"The Mystery of the Hero Academy"; Transliteration: "Yūsha Gakuin no Nazo" (Japanese: 勇者学院の謎)	Yamato Ouchi	Jin Tanaka	Hiroyuki Shimazu	August 29, 2020	
In the past, Anos told Kanon that he wanted to end the war. However, he was forced to injure Jerga during the confrontation. In the present, the students are told they will have inter-academy classes in the Human Realm. Anos, Misha, Sasha, Lay, and Misa have a training match during study hall. Later that day, Anos has a conversation with Melheis. Afterwards, he gives Lay a sword that belonged to someone he knew. Three weeks later, the students head to Gairadite for the inter-academy classes. Anos teleports everyone to the city. He and Sasha then head to Hero Academy Arclaniska. There, they meet Eleonore Bianca, a third-year student. She escorts them inside the academy. When Sasha calls out the inaccuracy of Kanon's victory over the Demon King of Tyranny, Anos stops her. Afterwards, Eleanor tells them about Jerga Kanon, an elite class of reincarnated heroes. They then meet two students, Ledriano Kanon Azeschen and Laos Kanon Jilfor, who claim to be Kanon's reincarnation, which Anos doubts. After he easily defeats Laos, Eleonore tells him Kanon was murdered 2,000 years ago by a human.
10	10	"Inter-Academy Exams"; Transliteration: "Gakuin Betsu Taikō Shiken" (Japanese: 学院別対抗試験)	Yuki Inaba	Jin Tanaka	Yoshifumi Sueda	September 5, 2020	
Inside the Hero Academy, Revest Aynie, a third-year student, confronts Anos about how he does not recognize him as the reincarnated Demon King. During the first day of the inter-academy classes, a demonstration of re-creation is held. The Hero Academy's representative, Ledriano, easily performs the task, while Revest struggles to do so. Anos then reveals that the Hero Academy rigged the demonstration. Later that night, Ivis tells Anos some new information he uncovered during his investigation. Afterwards, Anos heads to a festival with Misha and Sasha where they see Lay and Misa are on a date. The next day, the inter-academy exams commences at Lake Seimei. When Anos offers to take the exam, Revest decides that he wants to do it instead. During the exam, Revest's team struggles against the Hero Academy students. It is revealed that the Hero Academy has cheated by having Holy Water mixed in with the lake water to weaken the demons. Once he rescues Revest's team, Anos uses a spell to evaporate the lake. He then challenges the Hero Academy students.
11	11	"The Glow of Life"; Transliteration: "Inochi no Kagayaki" (Japanese: 命の輝き)	Yoshinobu Tokumoto	Jin Tanaka	Keisuke Inoue, Masafumi Tamura	September 12, 2020	
During the next round of the inter-academy exams, Anos' team notices that the Hero Academy students have put up a barrier that is enhancing their power. Misha decides to build a castle in the center of it. Anos then encounters another student who is supposedly Kanon's reincarnation named Zeshia Kanon Ijaysica. Meanwhile, Sasha and Lay challenge and defeat Laos and Heine Kanon Iorg, respectively. Afterwards, Anos takes on Ledriano and Zeshia where the city gives them their energy in order to empower them. However, Anos counters using the energy of his Unitarian classmates. Everyone then hears a mysterious voice tell the students to kill the demons. Despite Anos' warning, Zeshia unleashes a source explosion. Later, Eleonore asks Anos to head to the shrine. Misha heads to the shrine where she runs into a furious Diego Kanon Ijaysica, director of the Hero Academy. When Anos arrives, he stops Diego from brainwashing the students. After Anos kills Diego, he and Misha meet Eleonore where she reveals that she is magic.
12	12	"Taboo Magic"; Transliteration: "Kinki no Mahō" (Japanese: 禁忌の魔法)	Jun Fukuda	Jin Tanaka	Yoshinobu Tokumoto	September 19, 2020	
Eleonore reveals she was created with a Taboo Magic spell. As such, she is Human Magic. Anos then frees her so she can save the Human Academy students. Afterwards, Eleonore reveals the truth about the creation of the Hero Academy, the students, the origins of the voice he previously heard, her existence, and how Kanon was killed. Just as Anos is about to grant Eleonore's wish, they are confronted by a clone of Diego. Suddenly, three of the Elder Demon Emperors show up with a mysterious figure, who claims to be Avos. Avos taunts Anos before he leaves. A few days later, Avos declares war against humans. Meanwhile, Anos has a meeting with the remaining Elder Demon Emperors. There, his friends vow to help him as well. Later, while his friends take on Avos' forces, Anos decides to confront Avos by himself. When he does, it is revealed that Lay was masquerading as Avos and he is reincarnation of Kanon.
13	13	"Let the World Be Filled with Love"; Transliteration: "Sekai ga Ai ni Michiru Yō ni" (Japanese: 世界が愛に満ちるように)	Masafumi Tamura	Jin Tanaka	Masafumi Tamura	September 26, 2020	
Lay reveals to Anos the truth as to why he rewrote history following his death. Afterwards, Anos challenges Lay to a fight. During the fight, Anos takes out six of Lay's seven sources. However, Anos allows Lay to defeat him in order to stop the humans' hatred of demons. Refusing to accept the outcome, Diego tells the Zeshia clones to self-destruct. When Eleonore tries to reason with him, Jerga arrives in the form of Sacred Magic. He is then confronted by Lay and the fused Misha and Sasha. When Jerga attempts to once again have the Zeshia clones self-destruct, he is stopped by Anos. Jerga decides to forcefully drain the hope of the city in order to transform. While his friends rally behind him, Anos tells Jerga that the world is at peace now. When he refuses to believe this, he is cut down by Lay and Anos. Just before Jerga dies, Anos reincarnates him. After the battle, Anos reunites with Misha and Sasha, Lay reunites with Misa, and Eleonore becomes Anos' magic. Everyone then heads back home to the Demon Realm.
