= Kingdom season 4 =

Fourth season of Kingdom anime television series

Kingdom
- Season 4
- Key visual
- No. of episodes: 26

Release
- Original network: NHK BS Premium, NHK General TV
- Original release: April 10 – October 2, 2022

Season chronology
- ← Previous; Season 3 Next → Season 5

Kingdom is an anime adaptation of a manga series of the same title written and illustrated by Yasuhisa Hara. At the end of the third season's final episode, a fourth season was announced, and aired from April 10 to October 2, 2022. (Note: The fourth season premiered on NHK General TV on April 9 at 24:00 (effectively April 10 at 12:00 a.m.).) The cast returned to reprise their roles. The opening theme is "Rei -ray-" performed by Suiren while the ending theme is "Genyou (Dazzling)" performed by Haku. The second opening theme is "geki" performed by zonji, while the second ending theme is "Believe" performed by Misaki.

== Episodes ==
No. overall	No. in season	Title	Directed by	Written by	Storyboarded by	Original release date
104	1	"Seven Nations, After the War"; Transliteration: "Sengo no Shichi Koku" (Japanese: 戦後の七国)	Taiji Kawanishi	Junichi Miyashita	Yoshihiro Takamoto	April 10, 2022
105	2	"Ominous Shadow"; Transliteration: "Fuon na Kage" (Japanese: 不穏な影)	Natsumi Yasue	Shingo Irie	Toshinori Watanabe	April 17, 2022
106	3	"The Punitive Force Moves Out"; Transliteration: "Tōbatsu-gun Shutsujin" (Japanese: 討伐軍出陣)	Yasuhiro Geshi	Daishiro Tanimura	Toshinori Narita	April 24, 2022
107	4	"Assault on Tunliu"; Transliteration: "Tonryū Kōjō-sen" (Japanese: 屯留攻城戦)	Harume Kosaka	Suzuyuki Kaneko	Kenichi Imaizumi	May 1, 2022
108	5	"Sword and Shield"; Transliteration: "Ken to Tate" (Japanese: 剣と盾)	Taiji Kawanishi	Aya Yoshinaga	Kenichi Imaizumi	May 8, 2022
109	6	"A New Strategic Base"; Transliteration: "Aratana Yōsho" (Japanese: 新たな要所)	Kiyomitsu Satou	Aya Yoshinaga	Yoshihiro Takamoto	May 15, 2022
110	7	"The Call"; Transliteration: "Yobikake" (Japanese: 呼びかけ)	Kiyomitsu Satou	Noboru Takagi	Toshinori Narita	May 22, 2022
111	8	"Ten's Existence"; Transliteration: "Ten no Sonzai" (Japanese: 貂の存在)	Masayuki Iimura	Shingo Irie	Naoki Kotani	May 29, 2022
112	9	"Zi Bai's Name"; Transliteration: "Murasaki Haku no Na" (Japanese: 紫伯の名)	Kazuya Monma	Daishirou Tanimura	Kenichi Imaizumi	June 5, 2022
113	10	"The Eyes of the Middle Kingdom"; Transliteration: "Chūka no Chūmoku" (Japanese: 中華の注目)	Ippei Ichii	Suzuyuki Kaneko	Yoshihiro Takamoto; Kenichi Imaizumi	June 12, 2022
114	11	"Training Days"; Transliteration: "Shūren no Hibi" (Japanese: 修練の日々)	Taiji Kawanishi	Noboru Takagi	Toshinori Narita	June 19, 2022
115	12	"Age of Giants"; Transliteration: "Ketsubutsutachi no Sedai" (Japanese: 傑物達の世代)	Harume Kosaka	Shingo Irie	Yoshihiro Takamoto	June 26, 2022
116	13	"Movement in Xianyang"; Transliteration: "Kan'yō no Ugoki" (Japanese: 咸陽の動き)	Kiyomitsu Satou	Daishirou Tanimura	Kenichi Imaizumi	July 3, 2022
117	14	"A New Nation"; Transliteration: "Atarashī Kuni" (Japanese: 新しい国)	Natsumi Yasue	Junichi Miyashita	Toshinori Narita	July 10, 2022
118	15	"The Man Who Was Nothing"; Transliteration: "Nanimonai Otoko" (Japanese: 何もない男)	Kiyomitsu Satou	Aya Yoshinaga	Kenichi Imaizumi	July 17, 2022
119	16	"The Crowning Ceremony"; Transliteration: "Kaka no Gi" (Japanese: 加冠の儀)	Kazuya Monma	Suzuyuki Kaneko	Kenichi Imaizumi	July 24, 2022
120	17	"Three Sides, Unyielding"; Transliteration: "Sankata Yuzurazu" (Japanese: 三方ゆずらず)	Taiji Kawanishi	Noboru Takagi	Toshinori Narita	July 31, 2022
121	18	"River-Crossing Battle"; Transliteration: "Toka no Tatakai" (Japanese: 渡河の戦い)	Harume Kosaka	Shingo Irie	Kenichi Imaizumi	August 7, 2022
122	19	"A Parting of Ways"; Transliteration: "Tamoto wo Wakatsu" (Japanese: 袂を分かつ)	Kiyomitsu Satou	Daishirou Tanimura	Kenichi Imaizumi	August 14, 2022
123	20	"A Dream Nation"; Transliteration: "Yume no Yōna Kuni" (Japanese: 夢のような国)	Taiji Kawanishi	Junichi Miyashita	Kenichi Imaizumi	August 21, 2022
124	21	"Our Only Shot at Victory"; Transliteration: "Yuiitsu no Shōki" (Japanese: 唯一の勝機)	Natsumi Yasue	Aya Yoshinaga	Kenichi Imaizumi	August 28, 2022
125	22	"Running For Your Lives"; Transliteration: "Inochigake no Tōhi" (Japanese: 命がけの逃避)	Kiyomitsu Satou	Suzuyuki Kaneko	Kenichi Imaizumi	September 4, 2022
126	23	"Reversal Rush"; Transliteration: "Gyakuten no Mōshin" (Japanese: 逆転の猛進)	Taiji Kawanishi	Shingo Irie	Ippei Ichii	September 11, 2022
127	24	"The Rebellion's Conclusion"; Transliteration: "Nairan no Shūchakuten" (Japanese: 内乱の終着点)	Kazuya Monma	Noboru Takagi	Kazuya Monma	September 25, 2022
128	25	"A Time for Venturing Forth"; Transliteration: "Yūhi no Toki" (Japanese: 雄飛の刻)	Ippei Ichii	Noboru Takagi	Ippei Ichii; Kenichi Imaizumi	September 25, 2022
129	26	"The Six Great Generals' Whereabouts"; Transliteration: "Rikushō no Yukue" (Japanese: 六将の行方)	Ippei Ichii	Noboru Takagi	Kenichi Imaizumi	October 2, 2022
