= The Vermilion Mask =

Japanese manga series

- First tankōbon volume cover

朱色の仮面 (Shuiro no Kamen)
- Genre: Action; Fantasy
- Manga
- Written by: Dr.Poro
- Illustrated by: Nabana Naba
- Published by: Shōnen Gahōsha
- English publisher: NA: Orange Inc.
- Imprint: Young King Comics
- Magazine: Young King OURs
- Original run: February 27, 2021 – present
- Volumes: 9
- Anime television series
- Directed by: Tetsuaki Watanabe
- Written by: Daisuke Ōhigashi
- Music by: Arisa Okehazama
- Studio: 100studio
- Licensed by: Crunchyroll; SEA: Medialink
- Original network: NNS (ytv, Nippon TV)
- Original run: October 10, 2026 – present
- Episodes: 4
- icon

The Vermilion Mask (Japanese: 朱色の仮面, Hepburn: Shuiro no Kamen) is a Japanese manga series written by Dr.Poro and illustrated by Nabana Naba. It has been serialized in Shōnen Gahōsha's seinen manga magazine Young King OURs since February 2021 and has been collected in nine tankōbon volumes. An anime television series adaptation produced by 100studio premiered in October 2026.

== Plot ==
Peru is an apprentice mask artisan that can make masks which grant the wearer powerful abilities. One day, Peru puts on one of the most powerful masks made by his master, causing him to go berserk and unintentionally kill his friends and master. Once he calms down, he regrets his actions and decides to destroy every mask his master made to atone.

== Characters ==
Peru d'Arrest (ペル・ダレスト, Peru Daresuto)
Voiced by: Taihi Kimura
Sonarue Maywood (ソナルエ・メイウッド, Sonarue Meiuddo)
Voiced by: Yūki Yamamoto
Mok Sharib (モク・シャリブ, Moku Sharibu)
Voiced by: Kazuki Ura
Gouon (ゴウオン)
Voiced by: Takanori Hoshino
Totoque (トトク, Totoku)
Voiced by: Wataru Komada
Zent (ゼント, Zento)
Voiced by: Junya Enoki
Gaston (ガストン, Gasuton)
Voiced by: Kazuhiko Inoue
Mask of the Warrior God (武神の仮面, Bushin no Kamen)
Voiced by: Akio Otsuka
Hien (ヒエン)
Voiced by: Kenji Nojima
Lasgarl (ラスガール, Rasugāru)
Voiced by: Aoi Koga
Clown (クラウン, Kuraun)
Voiced by: Yuuki Shin
Rinne (リンネ)
Voiced by: Akihisa Wakayama
The Mask of Necromancy (死霊の仮面, Shiryō no Kamen)
Voiced by: Aya Endō
Master (マスター, Masutā)
Voiced by: Yui Horie

== Media ==
=== Manga ===
Written by Dr.Poro and illustrated by Nabana Naba, The Vermilion Mask began serialization in Shōnen Gahōsha's seinen manga magazine Young King OURs on February 27, 2021. Its chapters have been collected into nine tankōbon volumes as of July 2026. The series is licensed digitally in English by Orange Inc.

No.	Release date	ISBN
1	August 30, 2021	978-4-7859-6982-0
2	February 28, 2022	978-4-7859-7089-5
3	November 30, 2022	978-4-7859-7283-7
4	May 30, 2023	978-4-7859-7405-3
5	December 26, 2023	978-4-7859-7573-9
6	May 30, 2024	978-4-7859-7675-0
7	December 26, 2024	978-4-7859-7842-6
8	July 7, 2025	978-4-7859-7970-6
9	July 6, 2026	978-4-7859-8227-0

=== Anime ===
An anime television series adaptation was announced at Anime Expo 2025. The series is being produced by 100studio and directed by Tetsuaki Watanabe, with Gai Hazako serving as assistant director, Daisuke Ōhigashi handling series composition, Hisashi Higashijima designing the characters, and Arisa Okehazama composing the music. The series airs in two split cours on all NNS affiliate stations, including ytv and Nippon TV, with the first cour having premiered on October 10, 2026, and the second cours set to premiere in April 2027. For the first cours, the opening theme song is "Firestarter", performed by Man with a Mission, while the ending theme song is "Koe" (声), performed by Yutori. Crunchyroll is streaming this series. Medialink licensed the series
