= Kaiju Girls =

Japanese ONA series

- Promotional poster

怪獣娘(かいじゅうがーるず) (Kaijū Gāruzu)
- Genre: Comedy
- Created by: Tsuburaya Productions; Norimitsu Kaihō
- Original net animation
- Directed by: Minoru Ashina
- Written by: Minoru Ashina
- Music by: Yasuharu Takanashi
- Studio: Studio Puyukai
- Released: September 27, 2016 – December 13, 2016
- Runtime: 4 minutes
- Episodes: 12
- Original net animation

Kaiju Girls Second Season
- Directed by: Minoru Ashina
- Music by: Yasuharu Takanashi
- Studio: Studio Puyukai
- Released: January 9, 2018 – March 27, 2018
- Runtime: 4 minutes
- Episodes: 12
- Anime film

Kaiju Girls (Black)
- Directed by: Yasutaka Yamamoto
- Written by: Kento Shimoyama
- Music by: Shūji Katayama
- Studio: Yumeta Company
- Licensed by: NA: Sentai Filmworks
- Released: November 23, 2018
- icon

Kaiju Girls (Japanese: 怪獣娘(かいじゅうがーるず), Hepburn: Kaijū Gārūzu) is a Japanese series of web anime shorts that first aired September 27, 2016, provided by the Docomo Anime Store service. These shorts are part of the Ultra Monsters Anthropomorphic Project (ウルトラ怪獣擬人化計画, Ultra Kaijū Gijinka Keikaku), a moe anthropomorphism project made by Tsuburaya Productions based on past monsters/aliens that have appeared in the Ultra Series. Other than the short series, a manga series, a novel series and other projects are being considered in development. A second season premiered in 2018. A sequel film, titled Kaiju Girls (Black), was released on November 23, 2018.

== Synopsis ==
It has been years since the battle between the human race and the monsters has ended, and a new era of peace has started. In the present day, girls who contain the souls of past monsters have appeared and possess the ability to summon their inner monster forms, called Kaiju Girls (怪獣娘, Kaijū Musume). An organization called GIRLS has formed to collect them. The story focuses on the GIRLS rookie members, Agira, Miclas and Windom in their misadventures.

== Characters ==
=== GIRLS ===
The main characters in this series are composed of three rookie members of GIRLS. All of them are 16 years old and based on Ultraseven's Capsule Monsters.

Aki Miyashita (宮下アキ, Miyashita Aki)/Agira (アギラ)
Voiced by: Riho Iida
The main viewpoint character, who is timid among the trio. According to the director Minoru, she is chosen as the main character due to finding her situation of being "sandwiched" in-between energetic and calm characters quite interesting. She is the last to transform into her Kaiju form, which she acquired while saving a kindergartener from a car.
Miku Ushimaru (牛丸ミク, Ushimaru Miku)/Miclas (ミクラス, Mikurasu)
Voiced by: Aina Suzuki
The most energetic member of the team and is a fan of Great Monster Fight (大怪獣ファイト, Dai Kaijū Faito). She is the first to acquire her Kaiju form due to her admiration for Red King.
Reika Shirogane (白銀レイカ, Shirogane Reika)/Windom (ウインダム, Uindamu)
Voiced by: Yurika Endō
A no-nonsense person, who in reality is a yaoi fangirl. She acquired her Kaiju form when reading a yaoi manga.

=== Other characters ===
Zetton (ゼットン)
Voiced by: Emiri Katō
A mysterious woman who is actually the champion of Great Monster Fight matches and is GIRLS' strongest cadet. She views Agira being similar to her past.
Pigmon (ピグモン, Pigumon)
Voiced by: Sora Tokui
GIRLS' main idol, who introduced the Soulrizer that would allow girls with the spirit of an Ultra Kaiju to transform.
Red King (レッドキング, Reddo Kingu)
Voiced by: Hiromi Igarashi
One of the strongest fighters in the Great Monster Fight. Despite her strength, she also has an affinity for cute things. She usually hunts for Kaiju Girls that went on a rampage from the effects of transforming without the use of Soulrizer.
Eleking (エレキング, Erekingu)
Voiced by: Megumi Han
A yaoi fangirl who is adored by Windom. The original monster's tail was located on her right arm, which she uses as a whip.
Mikazuki Kuroda (黒田ミカヅキ, Kuroda Mikazuki)/Gomora (ゴモラ)
Voiced by: Ayaka Suwa
A friendly person who, despite living in Osaka, talks in a Kansai accent. She is also a contestant of Great Monster Fight but was defeated by Red King in a match.
Zandrias (ザンドリアス, Zandoriasu)
Voiced by: Kaede Yuasa
A rebellious middle school student who frequently runs away from home due to an argument with her mother, resulted in the acquirement of her monster form. But due to the lack of a Soulriser, she becomes a rampaging monster until Red King manages to neutralize the situation.
Ambiguous voice (誰かの声, Dareka no koe)
Voiced by: Shinya Takahashi
A mysterious character in Agira's consciousness whose voice call, "I'm counting on you, Agira!" gives her the courage that eventually leads to her acquirement of her monster form. He is theorized to be Dan Moroboshi, Agira's (and by extent, Miclas and Windom's) owner during his show, Ultra Seven.

== Media ==
=== Anime ===
The anime was first announced on March 25, 2016, with the promotional video aired at the AnimeJapan event at Tokyo Big Sight, originally under the title "Kaiju Girls ~Ultra Monster Anthropomorphic Project~ (Tentative)" (怪獣娘 ～ウルトラ怪獣擬人化計画～ （仮）, Kaijū Musume ~ Urutora Kaijū Gijin-ka Keikaku ~ (Kari)). Riho and Yurika are set to be the guest of honors in the annual Ultraman Festival 2016 on July 24.

Three voice actors for the series' main casts were unveiled on June 30, 2016, as Riho Iida, Aina Suzuki and Yurika Endō, who would as well perform the series' theme song. The staff is accepting suggestions for the trio's group name until July 15. The winning entry for the group name is Capsule Girls (かぷせるがーるず, Kapuseru Gāruzu) and the anime's opening theme is Jōjō ￪￪ GAO! ! (上々↑↑GAO !!; Great Roar!!), while the ending theme is Kaiju Heart (KAIJUハート, Kaiju Hāto). On September 27, Crunchyroll announced that they had acquired the rights to simulcast the series except in Asia.

=== Game ===
Kaiju Girls once collaborated with the mobile game Monmusu Harem which, similar to the Ultra Monster Anthropomorphic Plan, features more anthropomorphism of monsters. The cast of Kaiju Girls are featured as extra characters and all of them are reprised by their original voice actors.
