= Studio Puyukai =

Japanese animation studio

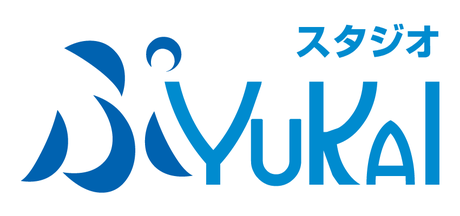
- Native name: スタジオぷYUKAI
- Romanized name: Sutaijo Puyukai
- Type: Kabushiki gaisha
- Industry: Japanese animation
- Website: puyukai.com

Studio Puyukai (Japanese: スタジオぷYUKAI, Hepburn: Sutaijo Puyukai) is a Japanese animation studio that specializes in chibi-style anime.

== Works ==
=== Television series ===
Title	Broadcast Channel	First run start date	First run end date	Eps	Note(s)	Ref(s)
Isekai Quartet	Tokyo MX	April 9, 2019	June 29, 2019	12	A chibi crossover between the light novel series KonoSuba, Overlord, Re:Zero, The Saga of Tanya the Evil, and cameos from The Rising of the Shield Hero.	
Isekai Quartet 2	Tokyo MX	January 15, 2020	April 1, 2020	12	Sequel to Isekai Quartet.	
Nights with a Cat	Tokyo MX	August 4, 2022	January 11, 2023	30	Based on a manga by Kyuryu Z.	
Snack Basue	Tokyo MX	January 13, 2024	April 5, 2024	13	Based on a manga by Forbidden Shibukawa.	
Isekai Quartet 3	Tokyo MX	October 13, 2025	TBA	TBA	Sequel to Isekai Quartet 2.	

=== Films ===
Title	Released	Note(s)	Ref(s)
Isekai Quartet: The Movie – Another World	June 10, 2022	Related to Isekai Quartet.	

=== Original video animations ===
Title	Released	Eps	Note(s)	Ref(s)
Boku, Otaryman.	January 29, 2010	2		
Spelunker-sensei	March 16, 2011	1		
Macross Delta: Delta Shougekijou	July 22, 2016 – July 24, 2017	9	Chibi spin off of Macross Delta.	
Overlord	September 30, 2016	1		

=== Original net animations ===
Title	Released	Eps	Note(s)	Ref(s)
Agukaru: Agriculture Angel Barak	September 17, 2010 – April 1, 2014	5		
Petit Gargantia	April 10, 2013 – July 3, 2013	13	Chibi spin off of Gargantia on the Verdurous Planet.	
Agukaru: Agriculture Angel Baraki - Play with Ibaraki-hen	June 6, 2014 – March 21, 2015	20	Sequel to Agukaru: Agriculture Angel Barak.	
Lord Marksman and Vanadis: Tigre and Vanadish	October 10, 2014 – January 6, 2015	14	Chibi spin off of Lord Marksman and Vanadis.	
Overlord: Ple Ple Pleiades	September 25, 2015 – present	TBA	A chibi-style spin-off of the Overlord anime television series.	
Re:Zero ~Starting Break Time From Zero~	April 8, 2016 – June 17, 2016	11	Chibi spin off of Re:Zero.	
Re:Zero Petit	June 24, 2016 – September 23, 2016	14	Sequel to Re:ZERO ~Starting Break Time From Zero~.	
Kaiju Girls	September 27, 2016 – December 13, 2016	12	Spin-off of the Ultra Series.	
Youjo Senki	January 10, 2017 – April 3, 2017	13	Chibi spin off of The Saga of Tanya the Evil.	
Mahoujin Guruguru Petit Anime Theater	July 14, 2017 – December 22, 2017	24	Chibi spin off of Magical Circle Guru Guru.	
Girls' Weekend Class	October 2, 2017 – December 22, 2017	12	Chibi spin off of Girls' Last Tour.	
Kaiju Girls Season 2	January 9, 2018 – March 27, 2018	12	Sequel to Kaiju Girls.	
Re:Zero ~Starting Break Time From Zero~ 2nd Season	July 10, 2020 – March 24, 2021	25	Sequel to Re:Zero ~Starting Break Time From Zero~.	
ChibiReve	April 12, 2021 – September 20, 2021	24	Chibi spin off of Tokyo Revengers.	
Nights with a Cat 2	March 8, 2023 – November 15, 2023	30	Sequel to Nights with a Cat.	
