= The Misfit of Demon King Academy season 2 =

2023 Japanese anime series

The Misfit of Demon King Academy II
- Season 2
- Promotional poster for the second season
- No. of episodes: 24

Release
- Original network: Tokyo MX
- Original release: January 8, 2023 – July 25, 2024

Season chronology
- ← Previous; Season 1

The second season of The Misfit of Demon King Academy, titled The Misfit of Demon King Academy II, is an anime television series based on the light novel series of the same title written by Shu and illustrated by Yoshinori Shizuma. On March 6, 2021, it was announced that the series would receive a second split-cour season with the staff and cast reprising their respective roles. Yūichirō Umehara replaced Tatsuhisa Suzuki as the voice of Anos Voldigoad for the second season. The first cour aired from January 8 to September 24, 2023. The opening theme is "Seien" by Lenny code fiction, while the ending theme is "Esoa" (エソア) by Momosumomosu. On February 11, 2023, it was announced that the seventh episode of the season and beyond would be postponed due to COVID-19. The season restarted broadcasting from the first episode on July 9, 2023. (Note: Tokyo MX listed the restart at 24:30 on July 8, 2023, which is effectively July 9 at 12:30 a.m.) The second cour aired from April 13 to July 25, 2024. (Note: Tokyo MX listed the premiere of the second cour at 24:00 on April 12, 2024, which is effectively April 13 at 12:00 a.m.) The second opening theme is "Maō" (魔王; "Demon King") by Burnout Syndromes and Nao Tōyama, while the second ending theme is "Shingetsu" (シンゲツ; "New Moon") by Tomori Kusunoki.

== Episodes ==
No. overall	No. in season	Title (Note: English translated titles are taken from Crunchyroll.)	Directed by	Written by	Storyboarded by	Original release date	Ref.
Part 1
14	1	"A Lesson by God"; Transliteration: "Kami no Jugyō" (Japanese: 神の授業)	Junya Koshiba	Jin Tanaka	Masafumi Tamura	January 8, 2023	
A flashback from 2,000 years ago depicts a battle between Anos Voldigoad, his right-hand Shin Reglia, the Mother of Spirits Reno, and the god Nosgalia in the spirit forest of Aharthern. After, Anos orders Shin to guard Reno. In the present, Anos and his friends/classmates return to their everyday school lives and receive a new official homeroom teacher, one of the Four Evil Kings called Erdomaid DittiJohn. In reality, Nosgalia has taken over Erdomaid's body. Meanwhile, another conspiracy to kill Anos is unveiled and an attack begins soon after.
15	2	"The Demon King in a Battle of Wits"; Transliteration: "Maō no chie kurabe" (Japanese: 魔王の知恵比べ)	Masafumi Tamura	Tamaho Ouchi	Masafumi Tamura	January 15, 2023	
Anos and friends battle their separate foes in various different ways, but they do not go down easily. Later, Melhais reports that the humans still hold contempt and fear for Avos Dilhevia despite witnessing what transpired over Azesion and advises Anos announce Avos was a fake at the ceremony to unveil Anos as the true second coming of the Demon King. Anos finally learns who the head of the Unitarians is.
16	3	"The Spirit's School Building"; Transliteration: "Seirei no Gakusha" (Japanese: 精霊の学舎)	Yusuke Onoda	Subaru Yoneyama	Masafumi Tamura	January 22, 2023	
Anos and the team, along with Nosgalia/Erdomaid, make their way to Azesion to open the path to Aharthern to hopefully meet with Shin. In order to get to the forest, Anos makes a deal with an unknown girl, later revealed to be named Lena, to take her with them. After revealing the path, they are guided through the forest by the titi sprites. Upon arriving, they are surprised by the other three of the other Four Evil Kings--Gilysiris Dello, Kyhilam Jiste, and Eges Code--and forced to attend a spirit school in order to meet with the Spirit King.
17	4	"The Spirit's Trial"; Transliteration: "Seirei no Shiren" (Japanese: 精霊の試練)	Junya Koshiba	Jin Tanaka	Koji Sawai, Masafumi Tamura	January 29, 2023	
The students all go through the final trials to meet the Spirit King and Gilysiris continues being shady, which Anos has to find a workaround for. He learns that something is suspicious about the Spirit King. Meanwhile, Lay and Misa make it to the Spirit King first. Back in Dilhade, yet another fake "Demon King" makes a public broadcast.
18	5	"Between Royalty and Mixed Blood"; Transliteration: "Kōzoku to Konketsu no Hazama de" (Japanese: 皇族と混血の狭間で)	Jun Fukuda	Subaru Yoneyama	Yūichi Nihei	February 5, 2023	
Misa is revealed to be the true Avos Dilhevia and she is real cocky and annoying, ordering the eradication of all mixed-blood demons. In order to save them all, Anos and company must escape the spirit school. In Dilhade, a purge perpetrated by demon "elites" begins to hunt down all mixed-bloods, and Anos devises a plan to solve the issue.
19	6	"The Great Mother Spirit and the Demon King's Right-Hand Man"; Transliteration: "Hahanaru dai Seirei to Maō no Migiude" (Japanese: 母なる大精霊と魔王の右腕)	Yusuke Onoda	Tamaho Ouchi	Masayoshi Nishida	February 12, 2023	
Anos and the other members of Team Anos appear in the dungeon in his original castle to infiltrate. They run into Revest Aynie and Ms. Meno, revealing more people who still believe in Anos and not the imposter. Anos goes back in time 2,000 years in order to learn what happened with Shin, Reno, and Misa. They learn Lena is the Love Fairy, Fran.
20	7	"Like a Single Stroke of a Sword"; Transliteration: "Tada Hitofuri no Ken Nogotoku" (Japanese: ただ一振りの剣の如く)	Junya Koshiba	Subaru Yoneyama	Kousaki Nishimoto, Masafumi Tamura	August 20, 2023	
Still in the past, Anos, Shin, Reno, and the others speak to the Great Tree of War before she passes on, and she grants all but Anos a boon. After, they all end up back in the spirit school, and Shin and Reno's relationship grows. Later, the events that transpired between Shin, Reno, Nosgalia, and pre-possession Erdomaid are revealed.
21	8	"The Land of Demons Without a Demon King"; Transliteration: "Maō no Inai Mazoku no Kuni" (Japanese: 魔王のいない魔族の国)	Rokō Ogiwara	Naoki Takahashi, Katsuji Matsumoto, Jiehuan Chen, Chia-Yun Zhao, Sinhua Li, Lan Ma	Shin Oonuma, Masayoshi Nishida	August 27, 2023	
2,000 years ago, a child attempted to see the Demon King but was turned away, as he was already reincarnated. In Aharthern, Anos tries to find a way to destroy Avos without also killing Misa. He also learns about some events that happened in Dilhade after he reincarnated, which leads him to intervene in past events and save Igareth, the child from before and the seventh prince of Azesion. As thanks, Igareth agrees to spread a rumor for Anos to change the future.
22	9	"A Prayer for Two Thousand Years Later"; Transliteration: "Ni Sennen go ni Kotowari o Komete" (Japanese: 二千年後に断りを込めて)	Masafumi Tamura	Tamaho Ouchi	Masafumi Tamura	September 3, 2023	
Still in the past, Anos and Misha eavesdrop on Erdomaid and his henchman discussing Erdomaid's plan to acquire divine power from Nosgalia. Yet more of the past is revealed in a flashback with Kanon, Shin, and Reno. Shin reminisces on his first meeting with Anos and how it changed his life.
23	10	"Send Hatred to the Past"; Transliteration: "Nikushimi wa Kako ni" (Japanese: 憎しみは過去に)	Yusuke Onoda	Subaru Yoneyama	Masayoshi Nishida, Masafumi Tamura	September 10, 2023	
Back in the present, everyone returns, distraught about the past's events but emboldened with new purpose. They begin their invasion to depose Avos. Anos and Lay confront Avos together and Anos's manipulation of the past bears fruit. Shin and Anos finally meet again in the present and have a heart-to-heart.
24	11	"To Sever That Fate"; Transliteration: "Sono Shukumei o Kotowaraki ro Tame ni" (Japanese: その宿命を断らきろために)	Yusuke Sekine	Tamaho Ouchi	Koichi Ohata	September 17, 2023	
Lay and Avos battle, with Lay trying to reach Misa. Nosgalia/Erdomaid interrupts and nearly kills Lay when Anos and Shin arrive in time to help. Reno makes an appearance, helping Shin against Nosgalia, and Avos won't go down without a serious fight.
25	12	"The Misfit"; Transliteration: "Futekigōsha" (Japanese: 不適合者)	Masafumi Tamura	Jin Tanaka	Masafumi Tamura	September 24, 2023	
Avos claims the Demon King's sword, Venuzdonoa, and an all-out fight between her and Anos begins. Nosgalia returns when Anos "defeats" Avos, after his apparent defeat earlier, and claims the prophecy of Anos's downfall is nigh. Erdomaid and Anos form a contract. The tragedy of Shin, Reno, and Misa is reconciled and Anos retakes his rightful throne after 2,000 years. However, he realizes part of his memory is missing.
Part 2
26	13	"Moon of Creation"; Transliteration: "Sōzō no Tsuki" (Japanese: 創造の月)	Shin Oonuma, Yusuke Sekine	Jin Tanaka	Shin Oonuma, Yusuke Sekine	April 13, 2024	
In the past, Anos talked with the Goddess of Creation Militia about how the world functioned on a cycle of mass death and rebirth and that such a system should perish. Over the course of several years, they became friends. In the present, Anos begins attending school as Anosh Poticoal, and Shin becomes a new instructor and proceeds to be an overprotective father. An underground resistance group that opposes Anos's new equality edicts is growing and they have a secret weapon, though Anos does not let it stand.
27	14	"Goddess of Selection"; Transliteration: "Sentei no Megami" (Japanese: 選定の神)	Shigeki Awai	Tamaho Ouchi	Kazuaki Mōri	April 20, 2024	
Dragon sightings and citizen disappearances are reported in Azesion, which Anos intends to deal with by having joint human/demon training with the help of Emilia. Emilia struggles to adjust to her new teaching position at the Hero Academy. Anos and Team have some lakeside fun. A cardinal named Ahid Alovo Agartz from Jirodal, the Kingdom of the Divine Dragon, makes contact with Anos/Anosh, who was apparently selected as a god's Chosen for the Judgement Selection, unbeknownst to him.
28	15	"Institute of the Gods"; Transliteration: "Jindai no Gakufu" (Japanese: 神代の学府)	Yusuke Onoda	Kō Yoneyama	Masafumi Tamura	April 27, 2024	
Erdomaid leads the Hero and Demon Academy students through dragon slaying training. Anos/Anosh shows a surprising dominion over dragons and demands they show him their nest in order to gain more information about Jiordal and the Judgement Selection. Once there, he learns more about the Selected 8, those chosen for the opportunity to become a god.
29	16	"With a Pinch of Courage"; Transliteration: "Chippo Kenayūki o Awasenagara" (Japanese: ちっぽけな勇気を合わせながら)	Junya Koshiba	Tamaho Ouchi	Yūichi Nihei	May 4, 2024	
Anos and Team investigate the Royal Palace in Azesion and classes continue. Lay and Misa infiltrate the palace later under the guise of attending a banquet to honor Kanon, though something is not right. Meanwhile, the Hero students struggle with their self-worth and sense of purpose, as does Emilia.
30	17	"Battle of Pride"; Transliteration: "Hokori no Tatakai" (Japanese: 誇りの戦い)	Shigeki Awai	Jin Tanaka	Kōki Onoue, Masafumi Tamura	May 11, 2024	
Dragons attack Azesion en masse, requiring the Hero students to defend their home, with Ellenore and Zeshia lending a hand since they were originally from the Hero Academy. Emilia finds a bit of herself. Anos, Misha, and Sasha confront more meddlers of the gods. Lay and Misa continue dealing with Azesion's greedy, arrogant king after being lured into a trap.
31	18	"Almighty Demon King"; Transliteration: "Zen'nōnaru Maō" (Japanese: 全能なる魔王)	Naoyoshi Kusaka	Kō Yoneyama	Masafumi Tamura	May 18, 2024	
Ahid threatens Dilhade, Anos plans to free the goddess Arcana, and Ahid and Anos duel. After the duel ends, Arcana professes to Anos that she cannot remember who she was before becoming a Selection God but does remember she wanted to be a kind god. Anos gives her the push she needs to move forward. Emilia is made the new headmaster of the Hero Academy.
32	19	"The Great Demon King Drills"; Transliteration: "Dai Maō Kyōren" (Japanese: 大魔王教練)	Yusuke Onoda	Tamaho Ouchi	Toshinori Narita	June 1, 2024	
Arcana dreams of her childhood, seemingly having a young Anos as her older brother, and begins living with him in reality. The gang seeks to understand the nature of Aisha, the name Anos gives Misha and Sasha's combined form, and Arcana's pre-reincarnated state. Additionally, they discuss finding Anos's missing memories. In order to do so, Anos becomes a temporary substitute teacher for their class, and he and Shin show off the depth of their love for each other.
33	20	"Kingdom of the Dragon God"; Transliteration: "Shin Ryū no Kuni" (Japanese: 神竜の国)	Shigeki Awai	Jin Tanaka	Seiji Okuda, Masafumi Tamura	June 8, 2024	
Anos and his class all descend to Jirodal and investigate the capital, Jiorhaze. Erdomaid unlocks some of his protégé's, Naya, potential and forms a bond with her. Anos intends to meet Jiordal's pope and Ahid makes a return.
34	21	"Demon King Hymn No. 6 'Neighbors'"; Transliteration: "Maō Sanbika Dai Rokuban 'Rinjin'" (Japanese: 魔王讃美歌第6番『隣人』)	Yasushi Sugimura	Tamaho Ouchi	Masafumi Tamura	June 15, 2024	
A religious festival held for sojourners to Jiordal is held but is interrupted by Ahid, only to be rescued by the Anos Fan Club. Anos meets with another Selection candidate, Diedrich Kreizen Agatha, king of Agatha, and they team up to meet the pope, Golroana Delo Jiordal. They duel and part with mututal respect. Anos learns what god chose him for the Judgement Selection.
35	22	"Liebarschend, the God of Vestiges"; Transliteration: "Konseki-shin Rībarushuneddo" (Japanese: 痕跡神リーバルシュネッド)	Yusuke Onoda	Tamaho Ouchi	Yō Nakano	June 29, 2024	
Anos fights Pope Golroana to force him to reveal the location of the God of Vestiges, Liebarschend, in order to discover his and Arcana's lost memories. Anos and Arcana continue their shared dream. The next day, they go after Liebarschend and run into Eges Code and Kyhilam Jiste again. A strange man from the shared dream, Ceris, professes himself to be Ceris Voldigoad, Anos's father from his previous life.
36	23	"The Promise Made in a Dream"; Transliteration: "Yume de Kawashita Yakusoku" (Japanese: 夢で交わした約束)	Naoyoshi Kusaka	Kō Yoneyama	Kazuaki Mōri	July 4, 2024	
Ceris reveals part of his plan to Anos and the rest, then absconds. Anos and Arcana finish their dream, where it is revealed they are not blood related but still see each other as family. The histories of Arcana, the Goddess of Lies and Betrayal Genedonov, and Jiordal are explained by Ceris, and an attack on the surface world begins.
37	24	"The Dream That God Saw"; Transliteration: "Kami no Mita Yume" (Japanese: 神の見た夢)	Junya Koshiba	Jin Tanaka	Masafumi Tamura	July 25, 2024	
The battle to defend the surface proceeds, and Cannibal, Naya's dragon summon, allows Anos to learn the underground world is actually inside a divine dragon. Anos, Liebarschend, and Pope Golroana fight. It is discovered Arcana lied about her memories and she is actually the goddess Genedonov, but Anos does not care and still declares her as his little sister. Meanwhile, Anos is still missing his memories.
