= Nights with a Cat =

Japanese manga series

- Cover of Nights with a Cat volume 1 by Kadokawa Shoten

夜は猫といっしょ (Yoru wa Neko to Issho)
- Genre: Comedy
- Manga
- Written by: Kyuryu Z
- Published by: Kadokawa Shoten
- English publisher: NA: Yen Press
- Magazine: Comic Bridge (jp)
- Original run: December 2019 – present
- Volumes: 9
- Anime television series

TV Edition
- Directed by: Minoru Ashina
- Written by: Minoru Ashina
- Music by: Kana Utatane (jp)
- Studio: Studio Puyukai
- Original network: Tokyo MX, AT-X
- Original run: August 4, 2022 – September 22, 2022
- Episodes: 16
- Original net animation

Web Edition
- Directed by: Minoru Ashina
- Written by: Minoru Ashina
- Music by: Kana Utatane
- Studio: Studio Puyukai
- Released: October 12, 2022 – September 3, 2025
- Episodes: 100
- icon

Nights with a Cat (Japanese: 夜は猫といっしょ, Hepburn: Yoru wa Neko to Issho) is a Japanese manga series written and illustrated by Kyuryu Z. Originally published on the author's Twitter account in December 2019, the series was later acquired by Kadokawa Shoten, who began publishing the series in tankōbon volumes in October 2020. As of July 2026, nine volumes have been released. An anime television series adaptation by Studio Puyukai aired from August to September 2022, and continued as an original net animation (ONA) from October 2022 to January 2023. A second season aired from March to November 2023. A third season aired from December 2024 to September 2025.

== Characters ==
Kyuruga (キュルガ)
Voiced by: Ayahi Takagaki
Kyuruga is a quirky cat who lives with Fuuta and Pi-chan.
Fuuta (フータくん, Fūta-kun)
Voiced by: Satoshi Hino
Fuuta is the brother of Kyuruga's owner Pi-chan. A working adult who used to live alone before his sister moved in.
Pi-chan (ピーちゃん)
Voiced by: Atsumi Tanezaki
Fuuta's younger sister and Kyuruga's owner. She currently lives with Fuuta after both she and Kyuruga moved into his home.
Chikuwa (チクワ) and Konbu (コンブ)
Voiced by: Aoi Yuki
Two pet cats who live with Miyama-senpai.
Miyama-senpai (ミヤマセンパイ)
Voiced by: Takuya Eguchi
Fuuta's colleague and Chikuwa and Konbu's owner.

== Media ==
=== Manga ===
The series began publication on Kyuryu Z's Twitter account in December 2019. It was later acquired by Kadokawa Shoten, who began publishing the series in tankōbon form on October 29, 2020. As of July 2026, nine tankōbon volumes have been released.

At Anime NYC 2021, Yen Press announced that they licensed the series for English publication.

==== Volumes ====
No.	Original release date	Original ISBN	English release date	English ISBN
1	October 29, 2020	978-4-04-064851-4	July 12, 2022	978-1-9753-4169-5
2	May 27, 2021	978-4-04-680431-0	October 18, 2022	978-1-9753-4171-8
3	April 28, 2022	978-4-04-681169-1	March 19, 2024	978-1-9753-8067-0
4	October 27, 2022	978-4-04-681722-8	December 17, 2024	978-1-9753-9116-4
5	July 27, 2023	978-4-04-682342-7	April 22, 2025	979-8-8554-0518-7
6	May 22, 2024	978-4-04-683613-7	September 23, 2025	979-8-8554-1472-1
7	January 22, 2025	978-4-04-683985-5	May 26, 2026	979-8-8554-2557-4
8	November 6, 2025	978-4-04-685151-2	February 23, 2027	979-8-8554-4853-5
9	July 8, 2026	978-4-04-660257-2	—	—

=== Anime ===
An anime adaptation was announced on April 26, 2022. It was later revealed to be a television series produced by Studio Puyukai and directed and written by Minoru Ashina, with Minoru Takehara designing the characters, and Kana Utatane (jp) composing the music. The series aired from August 4 to September 22, 2022, on Tokyo MX and AT-X. (Note: Tokyo MX lists the series premiere at 25:00 on August 3, 2022, which is effectively 1:00 a.m. JST on August 4.) It then continued online as an original net animation (ONA) on YouTube from October 12, 2022, to January 11, 2023. The theme song "Hinata no Kuni" was performed by Kashitarō Itō.

A second season was announced on January 11, 2023. The cast and staff reprised their roles. It aired from March 8 to November 15, 2023. The theme song, "Neko Neko Biyori", is again performed by Kashitarō Itō.

A third season was announced on National Cat Day on February 22, 2024. The cast from the previous seasons are again reprising their roles. It aired from December 4, 2024, to September 3, 2025. The theme song, "Ai Sazu ni wa Irarenai", is again performed by Kashitarō Itō.

A collaboration short anime with the Netflix series Gamera Rebirth was released in September 2023.
