= A Few Moments of Cheers =

2024 Japanese animated film

- Theatrical release poster
- Directed by: Popreq
- Screenplay by: Jukki Hanada
- Starring: Natsuki Hanae; Mariya Ise
- Music by: Tomoyuki Kono
- Production companies: Hurray!; 100studio
- Distributed by: Bandai Namco Filmworks
- Release date: June 14, 2024
- Running time: 68 minutes
- Country: Japan
- Language: Japanese

A Few Moments of Cheers (Japanese: 数分間のエールを, Hepburn: Sūfunkan no Ēru o) is a 2024 Japanese animated film. Produced by Hurray! and 100studio and distributed by Bandai Namco Filmworks, the film is directed by Popreq from a script written by Jukki Hanada. The film premiered in Japanese theaters in June 2024.

== Voice cast ==
Character	Japanese
Asaya Kanata	Natsuki Hanae
Yu Orie	Mariya Ise (speaking voice); Kei Sugawara (vocals)
Daisuke Tonosaki	Yuma Uchida
Emi Nakagawa	Fūka Izumi

== Production ==
The film is produced by Hurray! and 100studio and directed by Popreq, with Ohajiki as assistant director. Jukki Hanada wrote the screenplay, Magotsuki designed the characters, and Tomoyuki Kono composed the music. Natsuki Hanae and Mariya Ise were cast in the lead roles. The film's theme song is "Cyan" performed by rock band Frederic.

=== Release ===
The film was distributed by Bandai Namco Filmworks, which released the film in Japanese theaters on June 14, 2024. The film was released on Blu-ray and DVD on March 26, 2025, via Emotion.
