= 100studio =

Japanese animation studio

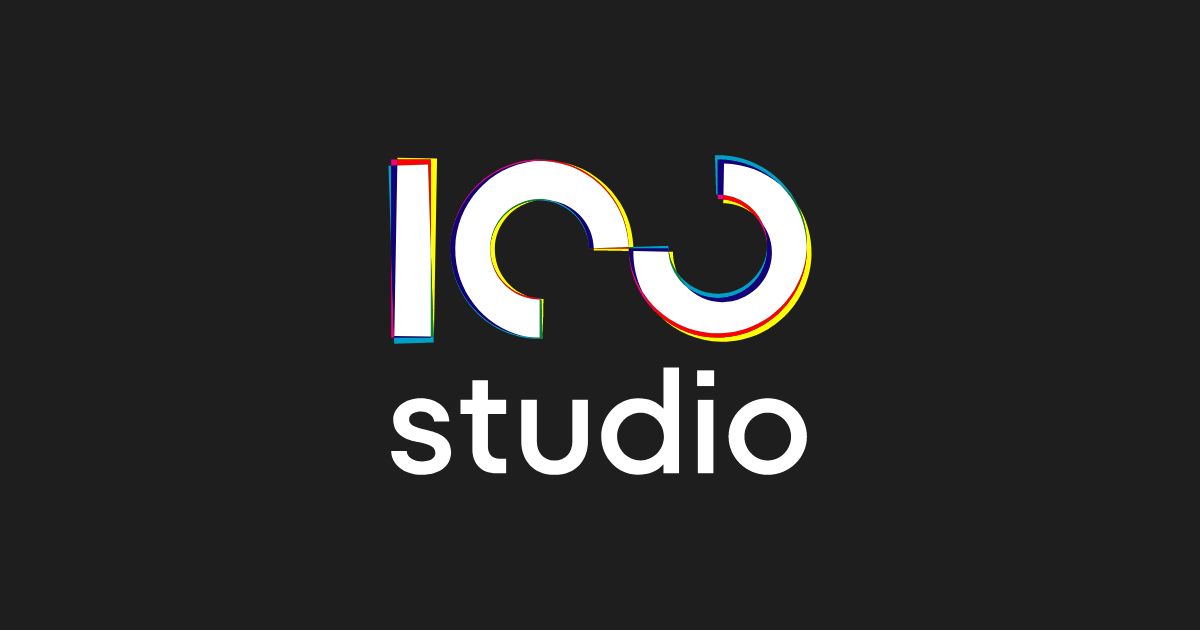
- Native name: 株式会社100studio
- Romanized name: Kabushiki-gaisha Wan Daburu Ō Sutajio
- Type: Kabushiki-gaisha
- Industry: Japanese animation
- Founded: May 31, 2021; 5 years ago
- Headquarters: Suginami, Tokyo, Japan
- Number of locations: 4
- Key people: Kōtarō Horiguchi (CEO)
- Owner: HIKE
- Number of employees: 102 (2025)
- Website: 100studio.jp

100studio Co., Ltd. (Japanese: 株式会社100studio, Hepburn: Kabushiki-gaisha Wan Daburu Ō Sutajio) is a Japanese animation studio based in Suginami founded in 2021. It is a subsidiary of HIKE.

== History ==
In May 2021, HIKE established a new organization under its intellectual property department, focusing on digital animation production. The studio is led by Kōtarō Horiguchi, who previously worked at a video production company and at Graphinica, and served as the head of HIKE's animation department.

As part of its expansion, HIKE established the Nishi-Ogikubo studio in April 2022, and the Taiwan studio in July of the same year.

== Works ==
=== Television series ===
Title	Director(s)	First run start date	First run end date	Eps	Note(s)	Ref(s)
Quality Assurance in Another World	Kei Umabiki	July 6, 2024	September 28, 2024	13	Based on a manga by Masamichi Sato. Co-produced with Studio Palette.	
The Mononoke Lecture Logs of Chuzenji-sensei	Chihiro Kumano	April 7, 2025	June 23, 2025	12	Based on a manga by Aki Shimizu.	
Black Torch	Kei Umabiki	July 4, 2026	September 19, 2026	12	Based on a manga by Tsuyoshi Takaki.	
The Vermilion Mask	Tetsuaki Watanabe	October 10, 2026	TBA	TBA	Based on a manga by Dr.Poro and Nabana Naba.	

=== Films ===
Title	Director(s)	Release date	Runtime	Note(s)	Ref(s)
A Few Moments of Cheers	Popreq	June 14, 2024	68 minutes	Original work. Co-produced with Hurray!	
