= Kingdom season 5 =

Fifth season of Kingdom anime television series

Kingdom
- Season 5
- No. of episodes: 13

Release
- Original network: NHK BS Premium, NHK General TV
- Original release: January 14 – March 31, 2024

Season chronology
- ← Previous; Season 4

Kingdom is an anime adaptation of a manga series of the same title written and illustrated by Yasuhisa Hara. A fifth season was announced at the end of the fourth season. It was originally planned to premiere on January 7, 2024, but was delayed by a week due to the channel coverage of the Noto earthquake, eventually airing from January 14 to March 31 of the same year. (Note: NHK listed the air dates for the series on Saturday at 24:00, which is effectively Sunday at midnight JST.)

The opening theme is "Douka" (導火, lit. Ignition) performed by DeNeel while the ending theme is "Rulers" performed by Novel Core.

== Episodes ==
No. overall	No. in season	Title	Directed by	Written by	Storyboarded by	Original release date
130	1	"Take the Field"; Transliteration: "Bakemono-tachi no Shutsujin" (Japanese: 化物達の出陣)	Taiji Kawanishi	Noboru Takagi	Kenichi Imaizumi	January 14, 2024
131	2	"The Stench of the Battlefield"; Transliteration: "Senjō no Nioi" (Japanese: 戦場の匂い)	Kazuya Monma	Noboru Takagi	Kenichi Imaizumi	January 21, 2024
132	3	"Heiyong at Night"; Transliteration: "Kuro Hitsuji no Yoru" (Japanese: 黒羊の夜)	Kiyomitsu Satou	Aya Yoshinaga	Kenichi Imaizumi	January 28, 2024
133	4	"A Lieutenant's Responsibility"; Transliteration: "Fukuchō no Sekinin" (Japanese: 副長の責任)	Reiko Nozaki	Junichi Miyashita	Kenichi Imaizumi	February 4, 2024
134	5	"A Determined Crossing"; Transliteration: "Shūnen no Toka" (Japanese: 執念の渡河)	Kazuya Monma	Daishirou Tanimura	Kenichi Imaizumi	February 11, 2024
135	6	"Heiyong's Crucial Moment"; Transliteration: "Kokuyō no Ooichiban" (Japanese: 黒羊の大一番)	Ippei Ichii	Aya Yoshinaga	Kenichi Imaizumi	February 18, 2024
136	7	"The Tragedy of Liyan"; Transliteration: "Rigan no Higeki" (Japanese: ライガンの悲劇)	Taiji Kawanishi	Junichi Miyashita	Kenichi Imaizumi	February 25, 2024
137	8	"In an Instant"; Transliteration: "Isshun de" (Japanese: 一瞬で)	Kazuya Monma	Noboru Takagi	Kenichi Imaizumi	March 3, 2024
138	9	"Misfortune"; Transliteration: "Fukō" (Japanese: 不幸)	Kiyomitsu Satou	Daishirou Tanimura	Kenichi Imaizumi	March 10, 2024
139	10	"Roar of Pride"; Transliteration: "Hokori no Hōkō" (Japanese: 誇りの咆哮)	Reiko Nozaki	Aya Yoshinaga	Kenichi Imaizumi	March 17, 2024
140	11	"Wei Ping and the Fei Xin Force"; Transliteration: "Gi Hira to Hishin-gun" (Japanese: 魏平と飛信軍)	Kazuya Monma	Junichi Miyashita	Kenichi Imaizumi	March 24, 2024
141	12	"The Small Hours Before a Showdown"; Transliteration: "Kessen mae no Sūjikan" (Japanese: 決戦前の数時間)	Ippei Ichii	Noboru Takagi	Kenichi Imaizumi	March 31, 2024
142	13	"Cai Ze's Honor"; Transliteration: "Sai Taku no Kyōji" (Japanese: 蔡沢の矜持)	Taiji Kawanishi	Noboru Takagi	Kenichi Imaizumi	March 31, 2024
