= Quality Assurance in Another World =

Japanese manga series and its adaptation(s)

- Cover of the first volume

この世界は不完全すぎる (Kono Sekai wa Fukanzen Sugiru)
- Manga
- Written by: Masamichi Sato
- Published by: Kodansha
- English publisher: NA: Kodansha USA
- Magazine: Comic Days
- Original run: May 30, 2020 – present
- Volumes: 19
- Anime television series
- Directed by: Kei Umabiki
- Written by: Shogo Yasukawa
- Music by: Yuta Kasai; Seima Iwahashi; Daisuke Horikawa
- Studio: 100studio; Studio Palette
- Licensed by: Crunchyroll (streaming); EA/SEA: Medialink
- Original network: MBS, TBS, BS-TBS, AT-X
- Original run: July 6, 2024 – September 28, 2024
- Episodes: 13
- icon

Quality Assurance in Another World (Japanese: この世界は不完全すぎる, Hepburn: Kono Sekai wa Fukanzen Sugiru; lit. "This World Is Too Defective") is a Japanese manga series written and illustrated by Masamichi Sato. It began serialization on Kodansha's Comic Days website in May 2020. As of November 2026, the series' individual chapters have been collected into nineteen volumes. An anime television series adaptation produced by 100studio and Studio Palette aired from July to September 2024.

== Plot ==
During the development of a virtual reality massively multiplayer online role-playing game, the game's quality assurance testers were trapped inside it. One year later, a tester named Haga continues his work by testing the game and submitting bug reports to its developers, while other testers recklessly use their debug mode access and abuse the game's non-player characters (NPCs). After a NPC named Nikola recovers from an event in the game's story that was supposed to kill everyone in her village, she joins Haga in his travels.

== Characters ==
Makoto Haga (ハガ マコト, Haga Makoto)
Voiced by: Kaito Ishikawa (Japanese); Blake McNamara (English)
A debugger who has been working tirelessly to report all the bugs within the game. Unlike the other debuggers who are either incapacitated or are slacking off, he continues to work diligently to report the game's bugs and refuses to use his debug stone that grants him special powers as he wants to see things from a typical gamer's perspective.
Nikola (ニコラ, Nikora; extra2/) Tesla (テスラ, Tesura)
Voiced by: Hinaki Yano (Japanese); Monica Flatley (English)
An NPC who accompanies Haga on his journey. She is killed after first meeting Haga, but is revived. She is also the embodiment of the game's meta AI program called Tesla. As Tesla, she orders Haga to collect the debug stones from the debuggers who abuse them.
Isora Amano (アマノ イソラ, Amano Isora)
Voiced by: Reiji Kawashima
Akira (アキラ)
Voiced by: Rie Takahashi
Jin (ジン)
Voiced by: Daisuke Ono
Sakai (サカイ)
Voiced by: Kishō Taniyama
Suzuki (スズキ)
Voiced by: Nobuhiko Okamoto (Japanese); Ryan Negron (English)
Namiko (ナミコ)
Voiced by: Natsumi Murakami (Japanese); Macy Anne Johnson (English)
Kuro-chan (クロちゃん)
Voiced by: Kentarō Kumagai
Shachō (社長)
Voiced by: Kentarō Itō
Sumida (スミダ)
Voiced by: Kenichirou Matsuda
Kana (カナ)
Voiced by: Chiemi Tanaka
Gödel (ゲーデル, Gēderu)
Voiced by: Yu Kobayashi
Akane Miyazaki (宮崎 アカネ, Miyazaki Akane)
Voiced by: Satomi Arai
Yamanaka (やまなか, Yamanaka)
Voiced by: Tomoaki Maeno
Alba (アルバ, Aruba)
Voiced by: Yoshitsugu Matsuoka
Ren Mizoguchi (溝口 レン, Mizoguchi Ren)
Voiced by: Tomokazu Sugita
Kinoshita (キノシタ)
Voiced by: Aoi Koga

== Media ==
=== Manga ===
Written and illustrated by Masamichi Sato, the series began serialization on Kodansha's Comic Days manga website on May 30, 2020. As of November 2026, the series' individual chapters have been collected into nineteen tankōbon volumes.

In May 2021, Kodansha USA announced that they licensed the series for digital English publication. In July 2022, during their panel at Anime Expo, Kodansha USA announced the print release of the series.

==== Volumes ====
No.	Original release date	Original ISBN	English release date	English ISBN
1	October 9, 2020	978-4-06-520873-1	June 29, 2021 (digital); April 4, 2023 (print)	978-1-63-699167-2 (digital); 978-1-64-651777-0 (print)
2	January 8, 2021	978-4-06-521992-8	July 27, 2021 (digital); June 6, 2023 (print)	978-1-63-699244-0 (digital); 978-1-64-651778-7 (print)
3	April 8, 2021	978-4-06-523041-1	August 24, 2021 (digital); August 8, 2023 (print)	978-1-63-699311-9 (digital); 978-1-64-651779-4 (print)
4	July 8, 2021	978-4-06-523956-8	November 16, 2021 (digital); October 31, 2023 (print)	978-1-63-699471-0 (digital); 978-1-64-651780-0 (print)
5	November 10, 2021	978-4-06-526012-8	May 31, 2022 (digital); December 19, 2023 (print)	978-1-68-491194-3 (digital); 978-1-64-651781-7 (print)
6	March 9, 2022	978-4-06-527333-3	October 11, 2022 (digital); February 20, 2024 (print)	978-1-68-491478-4 (digital); 978-1-64-651782-4 (print)
7	August 29, 2022	978-4-06-528311-0	March 14, 2023 (digital); April 2, 2024 (print)	978-1-68-491848-5 (digital); 978-1-64-651877-7 (print)
8	October 28, 2022	978-4-06-529377-5	June 6, 2023 (digital); June 4, 2024 (print)	978-1-68-491962-8 (digital); 978-1-64-651947-7 (print)
9	April 12, 2023	978-4-06-530845-5	September 12, 2023 (digital); August 13, 2024 (print)	979-8-88-933143-8 (digital); 979-8-88-877062-7 (print)
10	October 11, 2023	978-4-06-532212-3	March 12, 2024 (digital); October 8, 2024 (print)	979-8-88-933411-8 (digital); 979-8-88-877317-8 (print)
11	April 10, 2024	978-4-06-535125-3	September 10, 2024 (digital); March 11, 2025 (print)	979-8-89-478012-2 (digital); 979-8-88-877388-8 (print)
12	July 10, 2024	978-4-06-536214-3	December 10, 2024 (digital); August 19, 2025 (print)	979-8-89-478302-4 (digital); 979-8-88-877468-7 (print)
13	August 9, 2024	978-4-06-536384-3	March 18, 2025 (digital)	979-8-89-478433-5 (digital)
14	December 11, 2024	978-4-06-537862-5	June 17, 2025 (digital)	979-8-89-478555-4 (digital)
15	April 9, 2025	978-4-06-539148-8	October 14, 2025 (digital)	979-8-89-478728-2 (digital)
16	October 8, 2025	978-4-06-541176-6	March 17, 2026 (digital)	979-8-89-830036-4 (digital)
17	April 8, 2026	978-4-06-543285-3	August 18, 2026 (digital)	979-8-89-830208-5 (digital)
18	August 10, 2026	978-4-06-544732-1	December 15, 2026 (digital)	979-8-89-830353-2 (digital)
19	November 11, 2026	978-4-06-546015-3	—	—

=== Anime ===
An anime television series adaptation was announced in March 2023. The series is produced by 100studio and Studio Palette, and directed by Kei Umabiki, with series composition by Shogo Yasukawa, character designs by Shigeo Akahori, and music composed by Yuta Kasai, Seima Iwahashi and Daisuke Horikawa of Elements Garden. It was originally scheduled for April 2024, but was delayed to July, and eventually aired from July 6 to September 28, 2024, on the Animeism programming block on MBS, TBS and BS-TBS. (Note: MBS and TBS listed the series premiere on July 5, 2024, at 26:23, which is effectively July 6 at 2:23 a.m. JST.) The opening theme song is "No Complete" performed by Liyuu, while the ending theme song is "Loop" performed by Nacherry (a voice unit composed of Chiemi Tanaka and Natsumi Murakami). Crunchyroll streamed the series. Medialink licensed the series in East and Southeast Asia (Note: Including Afghanistan and excluding Mainland China, North Korea, and Japan) for streaming on Ani-One Asia's YouTube channel.

==== Episodes ====
No.	Title	Directed by	Written by (Note: Credited under "Scenario")	Storyboarded by	Original release date
1	"Nikola the Servant Girl"; Transliteration: "Shitabataraki no Nikora" (Japanese: 下働きのニコラ)	Kei Umabiki	Shogo Yasukawa	Kei Umabiki	July 6, 2024
Nikola lives in a small village that rarely sees trouble. That is until it gets attacked by Demidragons. However, Nikola is saved by a strange man named Haga. Nikola observes him doing strange things most notably writing things down before using a stone to send a beam of light to the sky. She deduces that he is a Seeker. A special unit of the King sent to observe strange phenomena. Just then the village comes under attack by a massive DemiDragon. Haga attacks it with a massive stockpile of arrows and explosives. With the villagers help he defeats the monster. However, out of nowhere Nikola and the other villagers burst into flames. Haga reveals that Seekers are just another word for debuggers and that the world is a video game called King Seeker's Online. That no matter what he did the village and the villagers still die. A flashback shows that Haga was part of a team sent to look for bugs in the game but were unable to logout and have been stuck for a year. That night Haga is about to send another message to the developers using his debugger stone when Nikola shows up at his tent.
2	"Haga Makato"; Transliteration: "Haga Makoto" (Japanese: 羽賀マコト)	Ippei Ichii	Shogo Yasukawa	Daisuke Shimamura	July 13, 2024
Haga is still confused as to how Nikola came back. Now Nikola says that she wants to join him on his journey and be a Seeker. The two travel to a small town where they repeatedly test the wall by running along it and jumping into it to see if they glitch into it or not. They camp outside the walls when they run into two other debuggers, Sakai and Sumida. Sakai explains that they are part of a group of debuggers who have been using Debug Mode to do whatever they want and they want Haga to join them. This angers Haga and he refuses. So Sumida repeatedly attacks them with his charge skill and using Debug Mode to move through the walls. However, Haga tricks him into falling outside the map as Haga steals his debug stone. Sakai runs away. Haga decides he needs to take Nikola to meet the rest of his team at the Advent Altar.
3	"Tesla"; Transliteration: "Tesura" (Japanese: テスラ)	Studio Palette	Shogo Yasukawa	Tatsushi Yamazaki	July 20, 2024
Haga and Nikola make it to the Advent Altar. Haga uses his experience of repeatedly going to this place to quickly move through it. However Nikola gets distracted by coins on the ground which triggers a trap set by monsters. Haga quickly defeats the monsters. As Nikola sits down she asks where Haga's allies are. He reveals that she is actually sitting on one of them. Flashbacks show that Haga's team started abusing Debug Mode after they could not log out. One got permanently glitched into the floor, another is stuck in an endless death cycle and one flew into the sky never to be seen again. The leader of Haga's team left to finish the game hoping it would allow them to log out while Haga stayed behind to keep debugging and hopefully free the two stuck. Haga says he has decided to move on as he has never been able to save the other two. As they are about to leave, Nikola steals both Haga's and Sumida's debug stones. She has been possessed by the games Meta AI program named Tesla. Tesla tells Haga he must find the other crooked Debuggers and steal their stones so she can destroy them. Thus revoking their debugger status. Otherwise their constant destruction will make it so the game is never finished. As the two continue their journey they come across an unknown village where the NPCs are stuck in T-pose.
4	"Isora Amano"; Transliteration: "Amano Isora" (Japanese: 天野イソラ)	Tetsuaki Watanabe	Shinichi Inozume	Yutaka Kōmi	July 27, 2024
Haga and Nikola go around gathering info on the buggy village before submitting their report. The next day the villagers are fixed but the two run into a small furry creature walking in T-pose. It uses magic to turn invisible but its footprints led them to its house. The creature is revealed as another debugger named Amano. He was part of the crooked debuggers but left them and left his debug stone behind as he was disgusted with their actions. He then stayed with an NPC named Lu who appreciates his work of writing manga. The boss of the crooked debuggers arrives at the village crushing it with a Demidragon. Lu unfortunately dies from her injuries. Amano vows revenge on the crooked debuggers.
5	"Infiltration"; Transliteration: "Sennyū" (Japanese: 潜入)	Hitoshi Moto	Katsuya Ishida	Hitoshi Moto	August 8, 2024 (Note: Episode 5 was delayed to August 7, 2024, due to the 2024 Summer Olympics, with the earliest broadcast on MBS at 26:33, which is effectively August 8 at 2:33 a.m. JST.)
The three begin their journey to the castle where the crooked debuggers have been using as a HQ. Along the way Haga gets Tesla to return to explain the situation to Amano. The three arrive at the castle only to see the bridge destroyed. The team goes to a nearby tower where Haga uses a glitch to launch them all the way to the castle. The three enter the castle through the main gate. This triggers a quest where they are arrested by the guards. They are brought to the cells but find out they are in a separated area from the crooked debuggers. They use this to travel freely through the castle. They end up in the torture chambers where Nikola uncovers chest filled with inappropriate sexual items. They are then confronted by a monster that speaks in English and uses a lot of profanity.
6	"The Mad King"; Transliteration: "Kyōran no Kentei" (Japanese: 狂乱の賢帝)	Ryosuke Izumiyoshi	Shogo Yasukawa	Daisuke Shimamura	August 10, 2024 (Note: This episode aired at 2:53 a.m. JST, 30 minutes after the original air time.)
Haga defeats the monster while having Nikola fill out a report on its profane language. The three move to where the final boss of their quest is but instead use a hole in the ceiling to move up to where the boss of the crooked debuggers is. While also setting a delayed pack of explosives to kill the game boss. That way when the game boss dies they will glitch back into the main game and sneak up on the crooked debuggers. Along the way, they are confronted by a huge knight who disappears in the middle of the fight. Meanwhile Sakai and the other crooked debuggers talk about how they have become tired of following their bosses orders. Haga and the others make it into the bosses room and hide in a chest just as the explosives go off. The boss talks to the others about wanting to complete the campaign in order to log out. Amano peeks outside the chest only to see Sakai and the others stabbing the boss.
7	"The Boss"; Transliteration: "Bosu" (Japanese: ボス)	Hitoshi Moto	Shinichi Inozume	Tatsushi Yamazaki	August 17, 2024
After killing the boss, Sakai and the other crooked debuggers say they want to stay in the game world. They leave and the trio comes out of the chest. Amano is frustrated he did not get his revenge and that it did not bring Lu back. Haga has Tesla devour the boss's debugger stone. As they leave, the tower starts falling apart as the crooked debuggers are removing stones from the boss's tower for a game. The tower falls and Haga and the others come out from the rubble and come face to face with Sakai's team. Haga grabs the others and tries to make it to the gate to trigger the quest again but gets attacked repeatedly and stopped by Sakai and the others. They offer a spot for Amano who appears to accept but instead uses a wind spell to blast the others past the gate. This triggers a bug, freezing all the crooked debuggers permanently which was Haga's actual plan. They destroy all their debugger stones and Haga wants to go back into the castle to fully debug it. However, they are confronted by the Boss. Amano immediately attacks him but the Boss secretly tells him that there is a way to bring Lu back. As they fully confirm the area is now going back to the way it should, Amano contemplates whether he should meet the Boss to find out this secret.
8	"Console Command"; Transliteration: "Konsōru Komando" (Japanese: コンソールコマンド)	Higashio Yamauchi & Maki Kamiya	Katsuya Ishida	Yutaka Kōmi & Tetsuaki Watanabe	August 24, 2024
The trio stays the night at a nearby inn. Haga stays up late filling out reports while Amano leaves to go to the Boss's destroyed tower. He finds his old debugger stone where The Boss said it was and makes a deal with him. The two ride out to Lu's village to bring her back in exchange for Amano helping the Boss beat the game. Amano successfully revives Lu but she has no memory of Amano. Meanwhile, Haga and Nikola go to change Nikola's class. She wants to be a thief like Haga but due to her NPC status she can't be anything other than a villager. Haga lies and says that there's an age requirement. They go to find a weapon for Nikola and come across a magic cannon device that scales in power to the users potential. However since Nikola doesn't have an actual potential it instead bugs out and fires at max power. Meanwhile, Amano is camping out with the Boss when the Boss is killed by the knight Haga fought earlier. Amano returns to the inn with the knight who reveals herself as another debugger named Akira.
9	"Akira Kagami"; Transliteration: "Kagami Akira" (Japanese: 加賀美アキラ)	Shunsuke Kishi	Katsuya Ishida	Yuji Kanzaki	August 31, 2024
Akira tells Haga and Amano that she was investigating the crooked debuggers herself when she ran into them and accidentally got pulled into their quest. She says she wants to live a normal life in the game world and after hearing Haga refuse to use debug mode, she backed off. She also decided to join the team. Haga and Amano accept her but decide to keep Tesla a secret. The next day Haga decides the team should journey to the kingdom of Stamoa to continue their debugging quest. Along the way, they find giants running away in fear and come across a superstrong child NPC named Gaydle. He tells them that a Seeker named Yamanaka made him his apprentice and is the reason he became so strong and has been protecting his village from giants ever since. Gaydle takes them to his village, but Haga, Amano and Akira notice a lot of tension between the other villagers and Gaydle. Haga sneaks out in the middle of the night and spies on the village warriors plotting to kill Gaydler, as they have grown tired of his reckless and destructive behavior.
10	"Gaydle and Yamanaka"; Transliteration: "Gēderu to Yamanaka" (Japanese: ゲーデルとヤマナカ)	Yuki Kadohara	Shogo Yasukawa	100studio	September 7, 2024
Haga is caught by the villagers. He asks them what happened to Gaydle. They say Yamanaka showed up one day and then disappeared with Gaydle for three days. When Gaydle returned he was in his overpowered form. Haga goes to his friends for help but Akira says to just kill him. As they are talking Akira hears fighting. They rush to Gaydle who has already slaughtered the other warriors. Haga decides to track Gaydle as he runs away to find Yamanaka and get him to explain what he did. A flashback shows that Yamanaka wanted to help Gaydle become a fighter but while messing with his stats he made him way overpowered. Gaydle finds Yamanaka in an unfinished dungeon unable to speak. Another flashback shows Yamanaka got stuck as essentially a spirit when he tried free camera mode on his debugger stone. Tesla steps in and devours Yamanaka's debugger stone. Trapping Yamanaka and Gaydle as they are permanently. This sends Gaydle into a rage and he attacks Tesla. Haga and Akira try to fight him but cannot even scratch him. Amano uses Nikola's blaster but only wounded him. Seeing what he has become, Yamanaka comes to regret his decision to make Gaydle superstrong. Haga grabs Akira and Nikola and along with Amano flee the cave.
11	"Alba"; Transliteration: "Aruba" (Japanese: アルバ)	Ippei Ichii	Shogo Yasukawa	100studio	September 14, 2024
Haga and the others retreat to the village to evacuate the villagers, but they refuse to leave. Gaydle storms in and rampages the village. He only stops when he sees kids cowering from him and realizes the monster he has become. Just then, he starts bleeding massively and dies. Akira used her debugger stone to use the kill command on Gaydle. Haga is upset by this, but Akira threatens him saying she has grown tired of his debugging obsession. She's stopped when giants attack the village. With no other option, the heroes flee and watch the village burn. Nikola is still unconscious from Gaydle's attack, so they decide to go to the kingdom of Sai. A month later the team makes it and meets with Akira's allies Ren and Akane. They have Haga and Akira do a ritual to ease their stress by burning papers with complaints on them where Haga writes his name as Makano. Later they meet with Akira's leader, Alba, who awakens Nikola, but she awakens as Tesla and attacks Alba. Tesla reveals Alba is another Meta AI program and that each of the five countries in the game has one. Tesla begins to interrogate Alba as to what he's doing trying to act like the king of this country.
12	"The Diamond"; Transliteration: "Za Daiyamondo" (Japanese: ザ・ダイヤモンド)	Han Yeong-hun	Shogo Yasukawa	Mamoru Kurosawa	September 21, 2024
The team retires for the night when Tesla asks Haga to submit a report on Alba's behavior. Just as Haga is about to hit send, Alba uses his power to send him to a dungeon. The next day Ren talks with Alba revealing the stress relief ritual was part of a trap so Alba could use his powers on Haga. However, Ren states that Amano, Akira, and Akane were part of it as well. So, they too were sent to a different part of the dungeon. Haga explores and finds a library where he meets a crystal creature debugger named Kinoshita. She says she was originally a lizard person until she tried armor on that bugged out and got her stuck in her current form. She too was mysteriously teleported into the dungeon she says is called "The Diamond" and says her and Haga are on the very last floor of it. Meanwhile, Amano and the others find a casino where Akane quickly loses all her money and goes into debt. She tries to leave without paying off her debt but is blocked. She's told the only way to pay off her debt is by letting the casino staff harvest her organs. Haga plans to escape the dungeon by going through the upper floors but Kinoshita reveals that to do that they would have to get past the dungeon's final boss. A giant goat creature named Silence.
13	"Silence"; Transliteration: "Sairensu" (Japanese: 沈黙の悪魔(サイレンス))	Yoshihide Ibata	Shogo Yasukawa	100studio	September 28, 2024
Haga finds out Silence reacts to any sound in his vicinity. Knowing he is unable to fight it on his own, him and Kinoshita retreat to the library hoping one of the books will show a weakness. Meanwhile Amano tries to win Akane's freedom by betting his own organs in a game of poker. He starts to win thanks to a bug in the deck but loses due to another bug that cost him all his chips. Out of nowhere, Haga appears and has the others use a wall clipping bug to escape the casino but the casino AIs turn into monsters and chase them back to the raid boss Silence. Haga tells the others to not say a word when they enter the room and find it covered in books. A flashback shows that Haga found out the books make no sound when struck, so he used them as stepping stones to escape the raid room. The monsters end up getting slaughtered by Silence. Kinoshita triggers a trap to kill Silence. Meanwhile, Ren tells Nikola that Haga and the others left her behind and tell her to go home. She starts traveling back but realizes Ren must have lied and the others are most likely still there. As she starts traveling back, the others soon find out that Silence is a multiple phase type boss.

== Reception ==
Yasushi Kobayashi from Da Vinci offered praise to the story, calling it intense. Masaki Endo from Tsutaya News also offered praise, calling it unique from works in the isekai genre. The reviewer from ITmedia had similar feelings, calling the story fun.
