= 2027 in anime =

Anime-related events during the year of 2027

Events in 2027 in anime.

== Releases ==
=== Films ===
A list of anime films that will be released in theaters between January 1 and December 31, 2027.

Release date	Title	Studio	Director(s)	Running time (minutes)	Ref.
January 15	Mobile Suit Gundam SEED Freedom Zero	Sunrise	Mitsuo Fukuda		
January 29	Pole Princess!!: Croix du Nord	Tatsunoko Production	Hitomi Ezoe	60	
February 5	Love Live! Nijigasaki High School Idol Club Final Chapter (part 3)	Sunrise	Tomoyuki Kawamura		
February 11	Ghost	Madhouse	Shingo Natsume		
February 19	Gekijōban Medalist	ENGI	Yasutaka Yamamoto		
March 5	Doraemon: Nobita's Steam-Powered Time Machine	Shin-Ei Animation	Rushio Moriyama		
March 5	Patlabor EZY: File 3	J.C.Staff	Yutaka Izubuchi		
March 26	Date A Live F Last Date	Fugaku	Junji Nishimura		
May 21	Girls Band Cry: The Movie	Toei Animation	Kazuo Sakai		

=== Television series ===
A list of anime television series that will debut between January 1 and December 31, 2027.

First run start and end dates	Title	Episodes	Studio	Director(s)	Original title	Ref.
January 2 –	In a World Full of Zombies I'm the Only One Who Doesn't Get Attacked		acca effe; Frontier Engine	Kazuya Fujishiro	Zombie no Afureta Sekai de Ore Dake ga Osowarenai	
January 4 –	Magical Buffs: The Support Caster Is Stronger Than He Realized!		J.C.Staff	Hideki Okamoto	Zatsuyō Fuyojutsu-shi ga Jibun no Saikyō ni Kizuku made: Meiwaku o Kakenai Yō ni Shite Kimashitaga, Tsuihō Sareta node Suki ni Ikiru Koto ni Shimashita	
January 4 –	Welcome to Demon School! Iruma-kun: IruMafia Edition	12	Tatsunoko Production	Keiichiro Kawaguchi	Mairimashita! Iruma-kun: If Episode of Mafia	
January 5 –	Mera×Death: The Unusual Love Between Me and the Grim Reaper		Qzil.la; Studio Keel	Kenta Kushitani	Mera×Death: Shinigami to Boku no Ijō na Koi	
January 5 –	Shin Oishinbo		SynergySP; Vega Entertainment	Kenichi Nishida		
January 6 –	Bride of the Barrier Master		Troyca	Tōru Kitahata	Kekkaishi no Ichirinka	
January 6 –	Multi-Mind Mayhem		Studio Deen	Hiroaki Sakurai	Isekai Tensei Sōdōki	
January 6 –	The Reincarnated Elf Left on a Journey to Master His Magic		Studio Palette	Yuki Inaba	Majutsu o Kiwamete Tabi ni Deta Tensei Erufu, Moteamashita Jumyō de Ikeru Densetsu to Naru	
January 6 –	Wanpaku! Touken Ranbu		Fanworks	Gaku Kinoshita		
January 7 –	Are You a Landmine, Chihara-san?		SynergySP	Yasuaki Fujii	Jirai Nandesuka? Chihara-san	
January 7 –	Charisma		Pierrot Films	Jōji Furuta		
January 7 –	Gacha Girls Corps		Zero-G; Saber Works	Masahiro Takata (chief); Takashi Asami	Gacha o Mawashite Nakama o Fuyasu Saikyō no Bishōjo Gundan o Tsukuriagero	
January 8 –	BanG Dream! MyGO!!!!! // Ave Mujica					
January 8 –	Bless		A-1 Pictures	Shōtarō Kitamura		
January 8 –	I Lost My Adventurer's License, but It's Fine Because I Have an Adorable Daughter Now		Studio Palette	Yuki Inaba	Bōkensha License o Hakudatsu Sareta Ossan dakedo, Manamusume ga Dekita node Nonbiri Jinsei o Ōka Suru	
January 8 –	Otherworldly Munchkin: Let's Speedrun the Dungeon with Only 1 HP!		Durandal	Naoya Fukushi	Isekai Munchkin: HP 1 no Mama de Saikyō Saisoku Dungeon Kōryaku	
January 8 –	The Guy She Was Interested in Wasn't a Guy at All		CloverWorks	Masashi Ishihama	Ki ni Natteru Hito ga Otoko Janakatta	
January 9 –	The Eternal Fool's Words of Wisdom		Studio Elle	Keisuke Ōnishi	Yūkyū no Gusha Asley no, Kenja no Susume	
January 9 –	Yaiba: Samurai Legend (season 2)		Wit Studio	Takahiro Hasui	Shin Samurai-den Yaiba	
January 10 –	A Pen, Handcuffs, and a Common-Law Marriage		EMT Squared	Takaaki Ishiyama	Pen to Wappa to Jijitsu Kon	
January 10 –	Love Live! Hasunosora Girls' High School Idol Club	7	Sublimation	Gō Kurosaki	Love Live! Hasunosora Jōgakuin School Idol Club	
January 10 –	Mashle (season 3)		A-1 Pictures	Tomonari Tanaka	Mashle: Sanma Taisō Shinkakusha Saishū Shiken-hen	
January 10 –	Mercedes and the Waning Moon		Teddy	Kunihisa Sugishima	Kaketa Tsuki no Mercedes: Kyūketsuki no Kizoku ni Tensei Shitakedo Suterare Sōnanode Dungeon o Seiha Suru	
January 10 –	Shangri-La Frontier (season 3)		C2C	Toshiyuki Kubooka (chief); Hiro Ōki		
January 10 –	The Fable (season 2)		Tezuka Productions	Ryōsuke Takahashi		
January 10 –	Wound & Bandage		J.C.Staff	Miyuki Ishida	Kizuguchi to Hōtai	
January 19 –	Sakamoto Days (season 2)		TMS Entertainment	Daisuke Nakajima		
January	Akane-banashi (season 2)		Zexcs	Ayumu Watanabe		
January	Aoharu Once More		Imagica Infos; Imageworks Studio	Rikako Machida		
January	Arcanadea		Yokohama Animation Laboratory	Keiichiro Kawaguchi		
January	Because I, the True Saint, Was Banished, That Country Is Done For!		Tsumugi Akita Animation Lab	Tsukasa Sakurai	Shin no Seijo de Aru Watashi wa Tsuihō Saremashita. Dakara Kono Kuni wa Mō Owari Desu	
January	Booty Royale: Never Go Down Without a Fight!		Raiose	Takashi Andō	Hagure Idol: Jigoku-hen	
January	Dengeki Daisy		Studio Deen	Souta Ueno		
January	Everyday Host (sequel)		Fanworks	Rarecho		
January	Giant Ojō-sama		Tatsunoko Production	Hiroshi Ikehata		
January	Hirayasumi		Production +h	Kei Suezawa		
January	Historié		Liden Films			
January	I Got a Cheat Skill in Another World and Became Unrivaled in the Real World, Too (season 2)		Millepensee	Shin Itagaki	Isekai de Cheat Skill o Te ni Shita Ore wa, Genjitsu Sekai o mo Musō Suru: Level Up wa Jinsei o Kaeta	
January	Inherit the Winds		Live2D Creative Studio; Drive	Tomohiro Kawamura	Kaze o Tsugu Mono	
January	Isshiki-san Wants to Know About Love		Sakura Create	Kazuya Komai	Isshiki-san wa Koi o Shiritai	
January	Living It Up in Another World Until I Get Bored				Isekai Dōraku ni Akitara	
January	Marriagetoxin (season 2)		Bones Film	Motonobu Hori		
January	Matsurika Kanriden		Maho Film	Takeshi Mori (chief); Yuichi Nakazawa		
January	Medaka Kuroiwa Is Impervious to My Charms (season 2)		SynergySP	Yoshiaki Okumura	Kuroiwa Medaka ni Watashi no Kawaii ga Tsūjinai	
January	Murciélago		Satelight; Staple Entertainment	Takashi Naoya (chief); Matsuo Asami		
January	My Sword Saint Master Is Too Cute to Live With!		Wolfsbane; Lightbox	Masayoshi Nishida	Dōkyo Shiteiru Kensei no Onna Shishō ga Kawaisugite Mainichi Shiawase Desu	
January	Nabe ni Tama o Ukenagara		J.C.Staff	Masahiro Hiraoka		
January	Now That We Draw		Roll2	Shunsuke Ishikawa	Kakunaru Ue wa	
January	One-Punch Man (season 3, part 2)		J.C.Staff	Shinpei Nagai	Wanpanman	
January	Ore to Yu Nii!		Studio Hibari	Noriko Hashimoto		
January	Red Cat Ramen (season 2)		E&H Production	Hisatoshi Shimizu	Ramen Aka Neko	
January	Red Riding Hood: A Detective Story		Benten Film	Itsuro Kawasaki	Akazukin, Tabi no Tochū de Shitai to Deau	
January	Reincarnation in the Game World Dan-Katsu		Studio Massket	Nagisa Miyazaki	Game Sekai Tensei "Dan-Katsu": Gamer wa "Dungeon Shūkatsu no Susume" o "Hajime kara" Play Suru	
January	Sekiro: No Defeat	8	Qzil.la	Kenichi Kutsuna		
January	Spice and Wolf: Merchant Meets the Wise Wolf (season 2)		Passione	Takeo Takahashi (chief); Hijiri Sanpei (chief); Nobuyoshi Nagayama; Takahiro Majima	Ōkami to Kōshinryō: Merchant Meets the Wise Wolf	
January	SSS-Class Revival Hunter		Studio Fu	Hiroaki Sakurai	Shishite Ikiru SSS-kyū Hunter	
January	The Diary of a Middle-Aged Sage's Carefree Life in Another World		Yanchester	Takayuki Inagaki	Arafō Kenja no Isekai Seikatsu Nikki	
January	The Final-Boss Prince Is Somehow Obsessed with the Chubby Villainess: Reincarnated Me		Studio Lings	Naoyuki Kuzuya	Odebu Akujo ni Tensei Shitara, Naze ka Last Boss Ōji-sama ni Shūchaku Sareteimasu	
January	The Fledgling Demon Lord's Starter Shop		Project No.9	Jun Hira	Sudachi no Maōjō	
January	The Kept Man of the Princess Knight		Blade	Chihiro Kumano	Himekishi-sama no Himo	
January	The World's Finest Assassin Gets Reincarnated in Another World as an Aristocrat (season 2)		Silver Link	Masafumi Tamura	Sekai Saikō no Ansatsusha, Isekai Kizoku ni Tensei Suru	
January	Though I Am an Inept Villainess (part 2)		Doga Kobo	Mitsue Yamazaki	Futsutsuka na Akujo de wa Gozaimasu ga: Sūgū Chōso Torikae Den	
January	Tsugumi Project					
April	Berserk of Gluttony (season 2)		A.C.G.T	Tetsuya Yanagisawa (chief); Kenichi Ishikura	Bōshoku no Berserk	
April	Eleceed		Dandelion Animation Studio	Hiroshi Nishikiori		
April	Everyone's Darling Has a Secret		Gekkou	Hikaru Sato	Hōkago no Idol ni wa Himitsu ga Aru	
April	Fate Rewinder		Bones Film	Rie Matsumoto	Unmei no Makimodoshi	
April	Glasses with a Chance of Delinquent		Studio Flad; Wao World	Makoto Hoshino	Megane, Tokidoki, Yankee-kun	
April	Happy Kanako's Killer Life		Drive	Shinji Takamatsu	Shiawase Kanako no Koroshiya Seikatsu	
April	Kagurabachi		Cypic	Tetsuya Takeuchi		
April	Kindergarten Wars		Sunrise; Felix Film	Shinsuke Gomi	Yōchien Wars	
April	Laid-Back Camp (season 4)		FuRyu Pictures	Shin Tosaka	Yuru Camp: Season 4	
April	LONA		Wit Studio	Takashi Katagiri		
April	Minami-ke: Korekara		Liden Films	Jun'ichi Kitamura		
April	Mobile Suit Gundam RG: XARX-ZERO		Sola Animation	Kenji Kamiyama	Kidō Senki Gundam RG XARX-ZERO	
April	My Crush's Crush		Project No.9	Kazuomi Koga	Boku no Suki na Hito ga Suki na Hito	
April	Rainy Day Serenade		Tezuka Productions	Takashi Kamei	Namidaame to Serenade	
April	Romelia War Chronicle (part 2)		Atra	Kōji Saitō	Romelia Senki	
April	Shōzen		Dangun Pictures; Cannon Code	Itsuro Kawasaki		
April	Skip and Loafer (season 2)		P.A. Works	Kotomi Deai	Skip to Loafer	
April	Tenkaichi: The Greatest Warrior Under the Rising Sun		Fugaku	Masashi Abe	Tenkaichi: Nihon Saikyō Bugeisha Ketteisen	
April	That Time I Got Reincarnated as a Slime: Clayman's Revenge		Eight Bit	Kentarō Sugimoto	Tensei Shitara Slime Datta Ken: Clayman Revenge	
April	The Apothecary Diaries (season 3, part 2)		OLM	Akinori Fudesaka	Kusuriya no Hitorigoto	
April	The Case Files of Biblia Bookstore		CloverWorks	Mamoru Kanbe	Biblia Koshodō no Jiken Techō	
April	The Dangers in My Heart (season 3)		Shin-Ei Animation	Hiroaki Akagi (chief); Chen Dali	Boku no Kokoro no Yabai Yatsu	
April	The Vermilion Mask (part 2)		100studio	Tetsuaki Watanabe	Shuiro no Kamen	
April	Walking Home with You				Hōkago Kitaku Biyori	
April	Witch and Mercenary		Eight Bit	Shinpei Ezaki	Majo to Yōhei	
July	Nue's Exorcist		Studio Hibari	Hiroyuki Hashimoto	Nue no Onmyōji	
July	That Time I Got Reincarnated as a Slime (season 4, part 3)		Eight Bit		Tensei Shitara Slime Datta Ken	
July	The Otome Heroine's Fight for Survival		Studio Clutch; Seven	Noriyoshi Sasaki	Otome Game no Heroine de Saikyō Survival	
October	Delicious in Dungeon (season 2)		Studio Trigger	Yoshihiro Miyajima	Dungeon Meshi	
October	Frieren: Beyond Journey's End (season 3)		Madhouse	Tomoya Kitagawa	Sōsō no Frieren	

=== Original net animations ===
A list of original net animations that will debut between January 1 and December 31, 2027.

First run start and end dates	Title	Episodes	Studio	Director(s)	Original title	Ref.
February	The One Piece		Wit Studio	Masashi Koizuka		
April	Aria the Scarlet Ammo Corto		Bellnox Films	Yoshifumi Sasahara		
