= Pro-Fit =

Japanese talent agency for voice actors

Pro-Fit Inc.
- Native name: 有限会社プロ・フィット
- Romanized name: Yūgen-gaisha Puro Fitto
- Founded: 4 November 2003; 22 years ago
- Defunct: February 2022
- Headquarters: Wakaba, Shinjuku, Tokyo, Japan
- Services: Talent management, casting
- Number of employees: 29
- Website: https://www.pro-fit.co.jp/index.html

Pro-Fit Inc. (有限会社プロ・フィット, Yūgen-gaisha Puro Fitto) was a Japanese voice acting agency. It was founded in 2003 and closed in March 2022.

Following its shutdown, a new agency Raccoon Dog was established and most Pro-Fit talent switched accordingly.

== History ==
The company was founded on 4 November 2003.

In November 2021, representative Makoto Tanimura announced that he would not be able to responsibly manage talent for the next few years. In response to this statement, affiliated voice actor Nobuhiko Okamoto and the Pro-Fit staff jointly established a new company Raccoon Dog, and most of the voice actors transferred to that company and disbanded.

Pro-Fit shut down in March 2022. Thirty-two voice actors transferred to Raccoon Dog in April.

== Attached talent ==
=== Male ===
- Shun Horie
- Yuu Kawada
- Kosuke Kobayashi
- Taro Masuoka
- Kenichi Mine
- Masato Nishino
- Nobuhiko Okamoto
- Koji Seki
- Yoku Shioya
- Kouichi Souma
- Ryo Sugisaki
- Shinya Takahashi
- Takuya Tsuda

=== Female ===
- Rie Haduki
- Ikumi Hasegawa
- Hikaru Iida
- Manaka Iwami
- Akari Kitō
- Manami Komori
- Keiko Manaka
- Nozomi Masu
- Marie Miyake
- Fumi Morisawa
- Juri Nagatsuma
- Kumiko Nakane
- Sachiko Okada
- Misaki Oshima
- Misano Sakai
- Yukina Shuto
- Natsumi Takamori
- Tomoyo Takayanagi
- Tomomi Tanaka
- Hana Hishikawa

== Former talent ==
- Taito Ban (moved to Office Osawa)
- Shizuka Ishigami (moved to Office Osawa)
- Kaito Ishikawa (moved to Stay-Luck)
- Haruki Ishiya (moved to Office Osawa)
- Ai Kayano (moved to Office Osawa)
- Minoru Shiraishi (moved to GadgetLink)
- Hiroshi Watanabe (moved to Kenyu Office)
- Aoi Yūki (moved to Aoni Production)
- Akane Misaka (moved to Crocodile)
- Shou Kiraike (now freelance)
- Fairouz Ai (moved to Mausu Promotion)
