= You Are Ms. Servant =

Japanese manga series

- First tankōbon volume cover, featuring Yuki

君は冥土様。 (Kimi wa Meido-sama)
- Genre: Romantic comedy; Slice of life
- Manga
- Written by: Shotan
- Published by: Shogakukan
- English publisher: SEA: Shogakukan Asia
- Magazine: Sunday Webry
- Original run: June 28, 2020 – present
- Volumes: 11
- Anime television series
- Directed by: Ayumu Watanabe
- Written by: Deko Akao
- Music by: Masahiro Tokuda
- Studio: Felix Film
- Licensed by: Crunchyroll (streaming); SA/SEA: Medialink
- Original network: ANN (TV Asahi); BS Asahi, AT-X
- Original run: October 6, 2024 – December 22, 2024
- Episodes: 12
- icon

You Are Ms. Servant (Japanese: 君は冥土様。, Hepburn: Kimi wa Meido-sama), stylised as You Are Ms. servant, is a Japanese manga series written and illustrated by Shotan. It began serialization on Shogakukan's Sunday Webry manga website in June 2020. An anime television series adaptation produced by Felix Film aired from October to December 2024.

== Plot ==
Yuki is a young woman raised from childhood to believe her only value was her ability to kill. Having known nothing but obedience and violence she seeks to abandon her former life and unexpectedly appears at the home of Hitoyoshi Yokoya, a high school student living alone, where she asks to be hired as a maid. Despite her elegant appearance and calm demeanor, Yuki possesses no domestic skills beyond her expertise as an assassin. After an incident in which she saves Hitoyoshi's life, he agrees to take her in, offering her a place to stay and a chance to start over.

As Yuki adjusts to life in the Yokoya household, she begins encountering ordinary experiences and emotions that were absent from her upbringing. Under Hitoyoshi's encouragement, she learns daily routines, forms connections with others, and gradually sheds the identity imposed on her by her past.

== Characters ==
Hitoyoshi Yokoya (横谷 人好, Yokoya Hitoyoshi)
Voiced by: Tsubasa Yonaga (PV), Toshiki Kumagai (anime) (Japanese); Abi Kumar, Claire Parry (young) (English)
An awkward high school student who lives alone and is often visited by his younger sister Riko. Initially, he is taken aback by Yuki's dark backstory as an assassin, but nevertheless, he hires her as his maid and invites her to live with him. It is later revealed that he had previously confessed his feelings to a girl he used to spend time with when he was younger. However, the girl rejected him, telling him he only confessed because he felt "lonely", and this broke his spirit and confidence. Ever since, he has been wary and dismissive of the idea of falling in love with someone and is scared of being rejected again, but throughout the course of the story, he finds himself developing romantic feelings for Yuki, despite constantly denying them.
Yuki (雪) / Xue (シュエ, Shue)
Voiced by: Reina Ueda (PV, anime) (Japanese); Trina Nishimura (English)
A beautiful and stoic young woman raised as the greatest assassin turned maid. She goes to Hitoyoshi in order to forget her dark past. Due to having had many different names, she can't remember her real name so she goes by Yuki, a name from a memory of her past. It is revealed that Yuki was born as Maria (マリア) and had parents and a little sister. She appeared on a talk show because she had lots of skills as a child prodigy. On her birthday, during christmas time, the family suddenly got a visit from someone and when her parents went to the door they were murdered in order to kidnap Yuki and her little sister. The sisters trained as assassins until the little sister got separated from Maria. The trauma caused Maria to forget her family and her name. She enrolls into Hitoyoshi's high school to learn how to become a normal girl, and immediately becomes popular among all the other students.
Agemochitarō (あげもち太郎)
Voiced by: Eriko Matsui (anime) (Japanese); Kelly Greenshield (English)
A playful dog Hitoyoshi and Yuki take in as a pet after finding it on the front porch of Hitoyoshi's house.
Riko Yokoya (横谷 李恋, Yokoya Riko)
Voiced by: Hikaru Iida (anime)
An outgoing girl and Hitoyoshi's younger sister who takes an immediate liking to both Yuki and Grace, and often bothers her brother.
Grace (グレイス, Gureisu)
Voiced by: Lynn (anime) (Japanese); Mallorie Rodak (English)
An assassin from the same organization like Yuki. She disguised as a teacher under her alias Nitta.
Naka Hikage (日陰 ナカ, Hikage Naka)
Voiced by: Konomi Inagaki (anime) (Japanese); Gillian Lange (English)

== Media ==
=== Manga ===
Written and illustrated by Shotan, You Are Ms. Servant began serialization on Shogakukan's Sunday Webry manga website on June 28, 2020. The first tankōbon volume was released on October 12, 2020. Its chapters have been collected into eleven tankōbon volumes as of March 2026.

The manga is licensed in Southeast Asia by Shogakukan Asia.

No.	Release date	ISBN
1	October 12, 2020	978-4-09-850306-3
2	February 12, 2021	978-4-09-850403-9
3	July 12, 2021	978-4-09-850549-4
4	December 10, 2021	978-4-09-850812-9
5	May 12, 2022	978-4-09-851138-9
6	November 10, 2022	978-4-09-851353-6
7	January 12, 2024	978-4-09-853082-3
8	August 8, 2024	978-4-09-853505-7
9	October 3, 2024	978-4-09-853623-8
10	March 12, 2025	978-4-09-854002-0
11	March 12, 2026	978-4-09-854464-6

=== Anime ===
An anime television series adaptation was announced on December 24, 2023. It is produced by Felix Film and directed by Ayumu Watanabe, with Deko Akao overseeing series scripts, Tomoyasu Kurashima designing the characters and Masahiro Tokuda composing the music. The series aired from October 6 to December 22, 2024, on the NUMAnimation programming block on all ANN affiliates, including TV Asahi. (Note: TV Asahi lists the series premiere on October 5, 2024, at 25:30, which is effectively October 6 at 1:30 a.m. JST.) The opening theme song is "Otozure" (おとずれ; Out of Sync), performed by Tricot, and the ending theme song is "Hyōjō Sabun" (表情差分; Facial Expression), performed by Dustcell. Crunchyroll is streaming the series. Medialink licensed the series in South and Southeast Asia, and Oceania (except Australia and New Zealand) for streaming on Ani-One Asia's YouTube channel.

==== Episodes ====
No.	Title	Directed by (Note: Production staff information is taken from the ending credits of each episode.)	Written by	Storyboarded by	Original release date
1	"My Fateful Encounter with You."; Transliteration: "Kimi to Unmei no Deai." (Japanese: 君と運命の出会い。)	Yū Harima	Deko Akao	Ayumu Watanabe	October 6, 2024
2	"You Want to Know."; Transliteration: "Kimi wa Shiritai." (Japanese: 君は知りたい。)	Tomoe Makino	Deko Akao	Tomoe Makino	October 13, 2024
3	"You are Ms. Yuki."; Transliteration: "Kimi wa Yuki-san." (Japanese: 君は雪さん。)	Yū Nobuta & Shо̄ Hamada	Deko Akao	Yū Nobuta	October 20, 2024
4	"You Won't Miss Out."; Transliteration: "Kimi wa Nogasanai." (Japanese: 君は逃さない。)	Masaharu Tomoda	Deko Akao	Masaharu Tomoda & Haruka Yoshinaga	October 27, 2024
5	"What You Want to Protect."; Transliteration: "Kimi no Mamoritai Mono." (Japanese: 君の護りたいもの。)	Shо̄ Hamada	Tomoko Shinoka	Hatsuki Tsuji	November 3, 2024
6	"You're Lonelier Than I Thought."; Transliteration: "Kimi wa Warito Sabishigariya." (Japanese: 君は割と寂しがりや。)	Sho Hamada	Deko Akao	Kenichi Yatagai	November 10, 2024
7	"You've Finally Figured It Out."; Transliteration: "Kimi wa Tsui ni Soko ni Kizuita." (Japanese: 君は遂にそこに気付いた。)	Yū Yabuuchi	Deko Akao	Hirohide Shikishima	November 17, 2024
8	"The Autumn With You and the Sauce."; Transliteration: "Kimi to Sōsu no Aki." (Japanese: 君と食欲(ソース)の秋。)	Takashi Kobayashi	Tomoko Shinozuka	Takashi Kobayashi	November 24, 2024
9	"You and the Cultural Stage."; Transliteration: "Kimi to Bunka no Dan." (Japanese: 君と文化の段。)	Michita Shiraishi	Tomoko Shinozuka	Hatsuki Tsuji	December 1, 2024 (Note: This episode aired at 2:00 a.m. JST, 30 minutes after the original air time on TV Asahi.)
10	"You and the Forbidden Fruit."; Transliteration: "Kimi to Kindan no Kajitsu." (Japanese: 君と禁断の果実。)	Yū Nobuta, Shō Hamada & Haruka Yoshinaga	Deko Akao	Yū Nobuta	December 8, 2024 (Note: This episode aired at 2:30 a.m. JST, 1 hour after the original air time on TV Asahi.)
11	"Your Prayers are Gods' Prayers."; Transliteration: "Kimi no Inori wa Kami no Inori." (Japanese: 君の祈りは神の祈り。)	Yū Yabūchi	Tomoko Shinozuka	Hatsuki Tsuji	December 15, 2024
12	"The Joyous Tidings You All Bring."; Transliteration: "Kimi-tachi ni Yoru Fukuin." (Japanese: 君たちによる福音。)	Tomomi Umezu	Deko Akao	Tomomi Umezu	December 22, 2024

=== Other media ===
A promotional video and television commercial commemorating the release of the series' third volume was published on Weekly Shōnen Sunday's YouTube channel in July 2021. It featured the voices of Tsubasa Yonaga and Reina Ueda as Hitoyoshi Yokoya and Yuki respectively.
