= I Was Reincarnated as the 7th Prince so I Can Take My Time Perfecting My Magical Ability =

Japanese light novel series

- First light novel volume cover

転生したら第七王子だったので、気ままに魔術を極めます (Tensei Shitara Dai Nana Ōji Datta no de, Kimama ni Majutsu o Kiwamemasu)
- Genre: Fantasy comedy
- Novel series
- Written by: Kenkyo na Circle
- Published by: Shōsetsuka ni Narō
- Original run: October 31, 2019 – present
- Light novel
- Written by: Kenkyo na Circle
- Illustrated by: Meru
- Published by: Kodansha
- Imprint: Kodansha Ranobe Bunko
- Original run: July 2, 2020 – present
- Volumes: 11
- Manga
- Written by: Kenkyo na Circle
- Illustrated by: Yōsuke Kokuzawa
- Published by: Kodansha
- English publisher: NA: Kodansha USA
- Imprint: Shōnen Magazine Comics
- Magazine: Magazine Pocket
- Original run: June 27, 2020 – present
- Volumes: 25
- Manga

Gendai Teni no Daini Ōji
- Written by: Keiri Amamiya
- Published by: Kodansha
- Imprint: Sirius KC
- Magazine: Magazine Pocket
- Original run: February 17, 2024 – November 2, 2024
- Volumes: 3
- Light novel

Gendai Teni no Daini Ōji
- Written by: Kenkyo na Circle
- Illustrated by: Meru
- Published by: Kodansha
- Imprint: Kodansha Ranobe Bunko
- Published: April 2, 2024
- Volumes: 1
- Anime television series
- Directed by: Jin Tamamura
- Produced by: Hirokazu Wakabayashi; Jin Tsuchihashi; Chieko Yamazaki; Kengo Abe (1–5); Kouhei Fukuda (1–7); Makoto Oda (6–); Norio Yamakawa (8–)
- Written by: Naoki Tozuka (Note: Series composition); Tokio Nazuka (Note: Screenplay)
- Music by: R.O.N
- Studio: Tsumugi Akita Animation Lab
- Licensed by: Crunchyroll: SA/SEA: Muse Communication
- Original network: TXN (TV Tokyo) (S1); TV Tokyo, TVO, TVA (S2); AT-X, BS NTV (S1-2)
- Original run: April 2, 2024 – September 25, 2025
- Episodes: 24
- icon

I Was Reincarnated as the 7th Prince so I Can Take My Time Perfecting My Magical Ability (Note: Japanese: 転生したら第七王子だったので、気ままに魔術を極めます, Hepburn: Tensei Shitara Dai Nana Ōji Datta no de, Kimama ni Majutsu o Kiwamemasu) is a Japanese light novel series written by Kenkyo na Circle and illustrated by Meru. It has been published online via the user-generated novel publishing website Shōsetsuka ni Narō since October 2019. It was later acquired by Kodansha, who has eleven volumes since July 2020 under their Kodansha Ranobe Bunko imprint. A manga adaptation illustrated by Yōsuke Kokuzawa has been serialized in Kodansha's Magazine Pocket website and app since June 2020, with its chapters collected into twenty-five tankōbon volumes as of November 2026. An anime television series adaptation produced by Tsumugi Akita Animation Lab aired from April to June 2024. A second season aired from July to September 2025.

== Plot ==
An ordinary sorcerer, lacking in bloodline and aptitude, meets a dumb death in a duel, but when he woke up, he was reincarnated as Lloyd, the seventh prince of the Kingdom of Saloum. In the new environment, he can now learn and master any magic at will, armed with the knowledge and memories of his previous life. As a result, he is now unrivaled in skill and a master of magic.

== Characters ==
Lloyd de Saloum (ロイド=ディ=サルーム, Roido Di Sarūmu)
Voiced by: Makoto Koichi, Jun Fukuyama (previous incarnation) (Japanese); Meg McClain, Travis Mullenix (previous incarnation) (English)
The seventh prince of the royal family that rules the Kingdom of Saloum. Although he is only ten years old, he has an enormous amount of magical knowledge and possesses mana that even terrifies demons (his mana often manifested as a gigantic black blob-like creature with an abyss full of skulls for eyes). He has no interest in the succession to the throne, women, or love, and devotes all of his actions and desires to the study and practice of his beloved magic, which is the main reason why he tried to keep his secret as an extraordinarily powerful sorcerer a secret, since he was worried that nobles would start pestering him and distract him from his research in magic.
Grimoire (グリモワール, Gurimowāru)
Voiced by: Fairouz Ai, Akio Otsuka (original form) (Japanese); Sara Ragsdale, Jim Foronda (original form) (English)
Lloyd's familiar, a demon who manipulates ancient magic that once drove the Kingdom of Saloum to the brink of destruction. He had been sealed away in a forbidden book in the kingdom's sealed archives for several hundred years, but Lloyd freed it and they met. However, he is overwhelmed by Lloyd's unfathomable magical power and sorcery and succumbs. He changes his appearance to that of an adorable small goat and begins to serve Lloyd, although at times of emergencies, he can transform into a human-demon hybrid form called "Grimtaro" to fight.
Sylpha Langlis (シルファ・ラングリス, Shirufa Rangurisu)
Voiced by: Lynn (Japanese); Morgan Berry (English)
Lloyd's personal maid, bodyguard, and swordsmanship teacher. The sole heir to the House of Langlis and a former A-rank adventurer known as the "Silver Blader", she fell in love with Lloyd to the point of obsession and devoted her life for him.
Tao Yuifa (タオ・ユイファ)
Voiced by: Akira Sekine (Japanese); Veronica Laux (English)
An A-rank adventurer and an expert martial artist, who practiced "Hyakkaken" martial arts from her grandfather. Her reason for becoming an adventurer is to "find hot guys to date". She unwittingly taught Lloyd how to use Qi while he was in disguise as "Lloberto".
Ren (レン)
Voiced by: Rie Takahashi (Japanese); Nia Celeste (English)
A member of the Assassins Guild, a group of assassins who kills only evil people that the Adventurer's Guild can't handle, and a Blighted, humans who was born with the ability to innately use magic, but are unable to control it. Her ability as the Poison Blighted allows her to excrete poison from her skin, which takes form as butterflies.
Initially, she can't control the lethality and the amount of poison she released, causing her parents' deaths and forcing her to wear a cloak at all times, but after Lloyd fixes her mana flow alongside the rest of the Assassins Guild, which allows her to reduce the poison's lethality to a mere knockout gas, she developed feelings for him.
Albert de Saloum (アルベルト・ディ・サルーム, Aruberuto Di Sarūmu)
Voiced by: Shun Horie (Japanese); Nasim Benelkour (English)
The second prince of Saloum Kingdom, and Lloyd's older brother. He's generally a charming and handsome prince, but secretly have an intense brocon towards Lloyd that rivals Sylpha's obsession, and the thought of him being harmed is the only thing that will make him lose his cool and fly on a rampage. While his combat skills are average, he makes it up with excellent diplomacy and tactical skills, making him the second favorite by the nobles to be the next king, next to his eldest brother Schneizel.
Dian de Saloum (ディアン・ディ・サルーム, Dian Di Sarūmu)
Voiced by: Yūya Hirose (Japanese); Ryan Negron (English)
The fourth prince of Saloum Kingdom and a blacksmith, owning a large smith behind the kingdom's royal palace. His dream is to create the ultimate Spellbound Sword, so that people with no talent for sorcery can use magic. Outside of smithing, he's a hot-headed meathead who often clashes with his brothers.
Alieze de Saloum (アリーゼ・ディ・サルーム, Arīze Di Sarūmu)
Voiced by: Akane Kumada (Japanese); Trisha Mellon (English)
The sixth princess of Saloum Kingdom and Lloyd's older sister. She loves animals and have an innate ability to subconciously tame and control animals with her mana flow, taming even a Lesser Fenrir. She heavily dotes on Lloyd and even kissed him on the lips at one point, which is why Lloyd is wary of her.
Shiro (シロ)
Voiced by: Eriko Matsui
A Bearwolf who was kidnapped by Pazuzu, a demon, after he killed his parents, and later experimented on him and put a mind control spell on him. After Lloyd freed him from his mind control and killed Pazuzu, Shiro stayed with him and became his pet.
Jade Lordost (ジェイド・ロードスト, Jeido Rōdosuto)
Voiced by: Nobunaga Shimazaki (Japanese); Ethan C. (English)
The leader of the Assassins Guild, and the Phantom Blighted, which allows him to teleport to anywhere in the world with his magic, "Shadow Wolf", but due to him not being able to control it, he would teleport at a random place in a random time, often at very inconvenient moments. He is also a noble and the third son of the Lordost clan.
Babylon (バビロン, Babiron)
Voiced by: Shun'ichi Toki (Japanese); Charles Nguyen (English)
A member of the Assassins Guild and the Wrap Blighted, which allows him to contort and twist every part of his body. He was unable to control which part of his body that he can twist, until Lloyd fixes his mana flow, which allowed him to contort even his heart, allowing him to survive supposedly fatal attacks.
Crow (クロウ, Kurō)
Voiced by: Takuma Nagatsuka (Japanese); Branden Loera (English)
A member of the Assassins Guild and the Curse Blighted, with an ability to materialize anything he says. Initially, he was unable to deactivate this power, causing him to voluntarily become a mute, until Lloyd fixes his mana flow.
Escher (イーシャ, Īsha)
Voiced by: Manaka Iwami (Japanese); Whitney Rodgers (English)
A sister in the Holy Church, and Saria's singing partner. Her singing voice is said to be angelic, to the point where Jihriel would give her his Divine Blessing, allowing her to use Divine Magic with her singing that heals and purifies anyone who hears it.
She joined the church with no other reason than she liked singing.
Saria de Saloum (サリア・ディ・サルーム, Saria Di Sarūmu)
Voiced by: Minami Tsuda
The fourth princess of Saloum Kingdom, and Lloyd's older sister. She's just as obsessed with music as much as Lloyd is obsessed with magic, to the point where she would often forget people's names if they're not a musician, even her own father. Just as Lloyd have an incredible talent in magic, Saria also have an incredible talent with music, where people across the kingdom would come just to see her play, and her music would soothe people in times of chaos.
Jihriel (ジリエル, Jirieru)
Voiced by: Showtaro Morikubo (Japanese); Reagan Murdock (English)
An angel who oversaw the Saloum Kingdom from Paradise, a divine realm separate from the mortal world. He's capable of granting Divine Magic to anyone he deemed worthy, by giving their spirits access to the "Path". Although a supposedly divine being, he is extremely perverted and would find any opportunity to ogle at girls, especially Escher and Saria, only for Grim to straighten him out every time. After witnessing Lloyd's power, he follows him into the mortal realm, transforming into a small yellow bird to avoid suspicion from Lloyd's entourage.
Mysterious Priest (謎神父, Nazo Shinpu)
Voiced by: Mitsuru Miyamoto
A mysterious priest who performs abhorrent experiments on humans and monsters under the Holy Church to create chimeras, who mysteriously have divine magic as well.
In addition to his body being composed of multiple S-rank monster parts that he can control at will, he can also use a type of divine magic called "Unholy Excalibur", which allows him to "purify" anything that he deems "evil", denoted by the symbols on the blades. If the symbol changes to a magic element, it will negate that type of magic, while if it changes to a specific person, it will instantly kill them if they are hit by it.
Lami (ラミィ, Ramyi)
Voiced by: Nako Misaki
A human-snake hybrid chimera, initially mistaken as a Lamia, and one of the mysterious priest's experiments.
Anastasia (アナスタシア, Anasutashia)
Voiced by: Yoko Hikasa
Pope Guitane's personal assistant and an Archbishop of the Holy Church, known as the "Lunar Priestess".

== Media ==
=== Light novels ===
Written by Kenkyo na Circle, I Was Reincarnated as the 7th Prince so I Can Take My Time Perfecting My Magical Ability began publication in the user-generated novel publishing website Shōsetsuka ni Narō on October 31, 2019. The series was later acquired by Kodansha, who began publishing the novels with illustrations by Meru on July 2, 2020, under their Kodansha Ranobe Bunko imprint. As of April 2026, eleven volumes have been released.

A spin-off light novel, titled Gendai Teni no Daini Ōji (現代転移の第二王子; lit. "The Second Prince Reincarnates to the Modern World"), was released on April 2, 2024.

No.	Release date	ISBN
1	July 2, 2020	978-4-06-520642-3
2	December 2, 2020	978-4-06-521533-3
3	May 6, 2021	978-4-06-523459-4
4	October 1, 2021	978-4-06-525020-4
5	July 1, 2022	978-4-06-528780-4
6	December 2, 2022	978-4-06-530455-6
7	December 1, 2023	978-4-06-534094-3
8	July 2, 2024	978-4-06-536480-2
9	April 2, 2025	978-4-06-539462-5
10	July 2, 2025	978-4-06-540225-2
11	April 2, 2026	978-4-06-543345-4
12	December 2, 2026	978-4-06-545975-1

==== Gendai Teni no Daini Ōji ====
No.	Release date	ISBN
1	April 2, 2024	978-4-06-534741-6

=== Manga ===
A manga adaptation illustrated by Yōsuke Kokuzawa began serialization in Kodansha's Magazine Pocket website and app on June 27, 2020. As of November 2026, twenty-five tankōbon volumes have been released. In North America, Kodansha USA licensed the manga for digital English publication. In November 2021, Kodansha USA announced that the series would be released in print in Fall 2022.

A spin-off manga illustrated by Keiri Amamiya, titled Gendai Teni no Daini Ōji (現代転移の第二王子; lit. "The Second Prince Reincarnates to the Modern World"), was serialized in Magazine Pocket from February 17 to November 2, 2024. Three tankōbon volumes were released from June 7, 2024, to January 8, 2025.

No.	Original release date	Original ISBN	English release date	English ISBN
1	November 9, 2020	978-4-06-521298-1	August 3, 2021 (digital); September 13, 2022 (print)	978-1-64-651496-0
2	February 9, 2021	978-4-06-522349-9	September 7, 2021 (digital); November 15, 2022 (print)	978-1-64-651497-7
3	May 7, 2021	978-4-06-523151-7	October 5, 2021 (digital); December 27, 2022 (print)	978-1-64-651498-4
4	August 6, 2021	978-4-06-524473-9	January 4, 2022 (digital); February 28, 2023 (print)	978-1-64-651499-1
5	November 9, 2021	978-4-06-525982-5	April 5, 2022 (digital); April 25, 2023 (print)	978-1-64-651702-2
6	February 9, 2022	978-4-06-526905-3	August 2, 2022 (digital); June 27, 2023 (print)	978-1-64-651703-9
7	May 9, 2022	978-4-06-527830-7	October 11, 2022 (digital); August 29, 2023 (print)	978-1-64-651794-7
8	August 9, 2022	978-4-06-528652-4	February 28, 2023 (digital); October 31, 2023 (print)	978-1-64-651833-3
9	November 9, 2022	978-4-06-529643-1	December 19, 2023	978-1-64-651897-5
10	February 9, 2023	978-4-06-530523-2	February 13, 2024 (digital); February 20, 2024 (print)	979-8-88-877000-9
11	May 9, 2023	978-4-06-531553-8	April 16, 2024	979-8-88-877051-1
12	August 8, 2023	978-4-06-532596-4	June 18, 2024	979-8-88-877052-8
13	November 9, 2023	978-4-06-533502-4	August 20, 2024	979-8-88-877262-1
14	February 8, 2024	978-4-06-534550-4	February 18, 2025 (digital); February 25, 2025 (print)	979-8-88-877331-4
15	April 9, 2024	978-4-06-535152-9	May 20, 2025	979-8-88-877386-4
16	August 7, 2024	978-4-06-536509-0	October 28, 2025	979-8-88-877477-9
17	November 8, 2024	978-4-06-537416-0	—	—
18	February 7, 2025	978-4-06-538402-2	—	—
19	May 9, 2025	978-4-06-539447-2	—	—
20	August 7, 2025	978-4-06-540350-1	—	—
21	November 7, 2025	978-4-06-541531-3	—	—
22	February 9, 2026	978-4-06-542586-2	—	—
23	May 8, 2026	978-4-06-543617-2	—	—
24	August 7, 2026	978-4-06-544614-0	—	—
25	November 9, 2026	978-4-06-545705-4	—	—

==== Gendai Teni no Daini Ōji ====
No.	Original release date	Original ISBN	English release date	English ISBN
1	June 7, 2024	978-4-06-535818-4	—	—
2	September 9, 2024	978-4-06-537228-9	—	—
3	January 8, 2025	978-4-06-537407-8	—	—

=== Anime ===
An anime television series adaptation was announced on November 5, 2022. It is produced by Tsumugi Akita Animation Lab and directed by Jin Tamamura, with scripts written by Naoki Tozuka, characters designed by Shigeru Nishigori, and music composed by R.O.N of Stereo Dive Foundation. The series aired from April 2 to June 18, 2024, on TV Tokyo and its affiliates, as well as other networks. (Note: TV Tokyo listed the series premiere on April 1, 2024 at 24:00, which is effectively April 2 at midnight JST.) The opening theme song is "Kyunrious" (キュンリアス), performed by Kaede Higuchi, while the ending theme song is "The Secret of Happiness" (ハッピーの秘訣, Happy no Hiketsu), performed by Akane Kumada.

After the airing of the final episode of the first season, a second season was announced, and aired from July 10 to September 25, 2025, on TV Tokyo and other networks. (Note: TV Tokyo listed the season premiere on July 9, 2025 at 24:00, which is effectively July 10 at midnight JST.) The opening theme song is "Calling", performed by Kaede Higuchi, while the ending theme song is "Meteor", performed by Nako Misaki.

At Anime Expo 2023, Crunchyroll announced that they had licensed the series outside of Asia. Muse Communication licensed the series in South and Southeast Asia.

==== Episodes ====
===== Season 1 (2024) =====
No. overall	No. in season	Title	Directed by (Note: Production staff information is taken from the ending credits of each episode.)	Storyboarded by	Original release date
1	1	"I Reincarnated as the Seventh Prince"; Transliteration: "Dai-nana Ōji ni Tensei Shimashita" (Japanese: 第七王子に転生しました)	Jin Tamamura; Yūichi Abe (Note: Action parts)	Jin Tamamura; Yūichi Abe	April 2, 2024
A man who died from not having any talent in sorcery was reincarnated as Lloyd, the Seventh Prince of Saloum Kingdom, who was blessed with both a strong magical bloodline and an aptitude for sorcery. One day, he sneaked into a sealed archive and awakened the Demon of the Forbidden Tome.
2	2	"I Encountered an Adventurer"; Transliteration: "Bōkensha ni Sōgū Shimashita" (Japanese: 冒険者に遭遇しました)	Jin Tamamura; Yūichi Abe	Jin Tamamura; Yūichi Abe	April 9, 2024
After the demon Grimoire swore his loyalty and became Lloyd's familiar, they headed into a dungeon. On the way there, they met Tao, a martial artist who uses Qi Technique. Interested in the technique, he joined Tao and headed to the dungeon's innermost depth.
3	3	"Like Qi Techniques and Enchantment Magic"; Transliteration: "Kijutsu Toka Fuyo Majutsu Toka" (Japanese: 気術とか付与魔術とか)	Jin Tamamura; Yūichi Abe	Jin Tamamura; Yūichi Abe	April 16, 2024
What awaits Lloberto and Tao and the depth of the dungeon is a lich that has ended numerous adventurers. After blasting Lloberto to the entrance, Tao tries to buy some time against the lich, but it proves to be too tough for her. As she was about to face her doom...
4	4	"Heading Out for a Monster Hunt"; Transliteration: "Majū-gari ni Mukaimasu" (Japanese: 魔獣狩りに向かいます)	Jin Tamamura; Yūichi Abe	Jin Tamamura; Yūichi Abe	April 23, 2024
In order to see the results of the swords he enchanted, Lloyd goes with Albert, Sylpha, and Tao on a monster hunt. However, they encountered a bearwolf with an abnormally high regeneration rate...
5	5	"The Demon is Angry"; Transliteration: "Majin ga Iradatte Imasu" (Japanese: 魔人が苛立っています)	Jin Tamamura; Yūichi Abe	Jin Tamamura; Yūichi Abe	April 30, 2024
Sylpha seems to have defeated the bearwolves, but after Pazuzu unleashes his miasma, the situation immediately turns into a predicament. As Sylpha and Tao cannot fight back and cornered, Lloyd finally makes his move.
6	6	"Sisters, Monsters, Spellbound Swords, and Brothers"; Transliteration: "Ane to Majū to Maken to Ani to" (Japanese: 姉と魔獣と魔剣と兄と)	Jin Tamamura	Jin Tamamura	May 7, 2024
Lloyd asks his older sister, Alieze the sixth princess of Saloum, to teach him the secret to communicating with monsters. After that, he was reunited with Dian the fourth prince, who seeks to create the ultimate spellbound sword.
7	7	"I'm Going to Battle Some Assassins"; Transliteration: "Ansatsusha-tachi to Batorushimasu" (Japanese: 暗殺者たちとバトルします)	Jin Tamamura; Yūichi Abe	Jin Tamamura; Yūichi Abe	May 14, 2024
After finding out the powers of Ren the Poison Blighted from the Assassins Guild, Lloyd became interested with the other members of the guild. Lloyd followed her and snuck into their base, and the assassins started attacking him.
8	8	"I'm Going to Meet Jade"; Transliteration: "Jeido ni Ai ni Ikimasu" (Japanese: ジェイドに会いに行きます)	Jin Tamamura; Yūichi Abe	Jin Tamamura; Yūichi Abe	May 20, 2024
Having formed a connection with the Assassin's Guild members, Lloyd's curiosity is captured by the teleportation ability of their leader, Jade. Following a letter from the elusive leader, Lloyd and the assassins head to Lordost Manor, where the guild is happy to be reunited with Jade, until...
9	9	"The Cataclysm Named Guisarme"; Transliteration: "Gizarumu to Iu Saiyaku" (Japanese: ギザルムという災厄)	Jin Tamamura; Yūichi Abe	Jin Tamamura; Yūichi Abe	May 27, 2024
Ren is confronted by the demon lord Guisarme, who has stolen Jade's body and teleportation power. Having offered the people of Lordost to his demon retinue as hosts, and taken control of the territory, Guisarme is intent on seizing the bodies of the Assassin's Guild as well, when Lloyd arrives in the nick of time to defend them.
10	10	"Sylpha's Blade"; Transliteration: "Shirufa no Ken" (Japanese: シルファの剣)	Jin Tamamura; Yūichi Abe	Jin Tamamura; Yūichi Abe	June 4, 2024
As Lloyd and Guisarme engage in fierce combat, the members of the Assassin's Guild are cornered by a horde of demons. Using the control of their abilities given to them by Lloyd's spell, the Guild resists, but the overwhelming demonic strength of their enemies gradually overpowers them...
11	11	"Jade's Last Word"; Transliteration: "Jeido no Yuigon" (Japanese: ジェイドの遺言)	Jin Tamamura; Yūichi Abe	Jin Tamamura; Yūichi Abe	June 11, 2024
12	12	"Lloyd's Answer"; Transliteration: "Roido no Kotae" (Japanese: ロイドの答え)	Jin Tamamura; Yūichi Abe	Jin Tamamura; Yūichi Abe	June 18, 2024

===== Season 2 (2025) =====
No. overall	No. in season	Title	Directed by	Storyboarded by	Original release date
13	1	"I'll Join the Church!"; Transliteration: "Nyūshin Shimasu!" (Japanese: 入信します!)	Jin Tamamura; Yūichi Abe	Jin Tamamura; Yūichi Abe	July 10, 2025
14	2	"Jihriel's Miracles"; Transliteration: "Jirieru no Miwaza" (Japanese: ジリエルの御業)	Jin Tamamura; Yūichi Abe	Jin Tamamura; Yūichi Abe	July 17, 2025
15	3	"Ghoul Hunting"; Transliteration: "Gūru Taiji" (Japanese: グール退治)	Jin Tamamura; Yūichi Abe	Jin Tamamura; Yūichi Abe	July 24, 2025
16	4	"Civil War"; Transliteration: "Shibiru Wō" (Japanese: シビル・ウォー)	Jin Tamamura; Yūichi Abe	Jin Tamamura; Yūichi Abe	July 31, 2025
17	5	"The Church's Secret"; Transliteration: "Kyōkai no Himitsu" (Japanese: 教会の秘密)	Jin Tamamura; Yūichi Abe	Jin Tamamura; Yūichi Abe	August 7, 2025
18	6	"Escher's Will"; Transliteration: "Īsha no Omoi" (Japanese: イーシャの想い)	Jin Tamamura; Yūichi Abe	Jin Tamamura; Yūichi Abe	August 14, 2025
19	7	"The Great Advent Festival"; Transliteration: "Dai-seitan-sai" (Japanese: 大聖誕祭)	Jin Tamamura; Yūichi Abe	Jin Tamamura; Yūichi Abe	August 21, 2025
20	8	"Invasion"; Transliteration: "Shūrai" (Japanese: 襲来)	Jin Tamamura; Yūichi Abe	Jin Tamamura; Yūichi Abe	August 28, 2025
21	9	"The moon and Tonkatsu"; Transliteration: "Tsuki to Tonkatsu" (Japanese: 月とトンカツ)	Jin Tamamura; Yūichi Abe	Jin Tamamura; Yūichi Abe	September 4, 2025
22	10	"Black Dragon"; Transliteration: "Kokuryū" (Japanese: 黒竜)	Jin Tamamura; Yūichi Abe	Jin Tamamura; Yūichi Abe	September 11, 2025
23	11	"The Battle Above the Clouds"; Transliteration: "Tenjō Kessen" (Japanese: 天上決戦)	Jin Tamamura; Yūichi Abe	Jin Tamamura; Yūichi Abe	September 18, 2025
24	12	"In the Light"; Transliteration: "Hikari no Naka de" (Japanese: 光の中で)	Jin Tamamura; Yūichi Abe	Jin Tamamura; Yūichi Abe	September 25, 2025

== Reception ==
In 2021, the manga adaptation ranked eighth in the seventh Next Manga Awards in the web manga category. By November 2022, the series had over 2.5 million copies in circulation.
