= Hikaru Iida =

Japanese voice actress and singer

- 飯田 ヒカル
- Born: 28 August
- Occupations: Voice actress; singer
- Years active: 2019–present
- Employer: Raccoon Dog
- Notable work: Gakuen Idolmaster as Kotone Fujita; You Are Ms. Servant as Riko Yokoya

Hikaru Iida (Japanese: 飯田 ヒカル, Hepburn: Iida Hikaru; born 28 August) is a Japanese voice actress and singer from Fukuoka Prefecture, affiliated with Raccoon Dog. She has starred as Kotone Fujita in Gakuen Idolmaster and Riko Yokoya in You Are Ms. Servant.

== Biography ==
Hikaru Iida, a native of Fukuoka Prefecture, was born on 28 August. She decided to become a voice actor because she was known at school for her high-pitched voice and in junior high, received praise from a Japanese class teacher for her reading-aloud skills. A frequent stage actor at her high school where several classmates even auditioned outside of school, she won the runner-up prize at the Cross FM Seiyū Stadium 2017 in Fukuoka while at her third year of high school. She graduated from Pro-Fit Voice Actor Training School and joined the agency.

Iida's first appearance in an anime television series was as Sukashi Masamune in the Tenka Hyakken: Meiji-kan e Yōkoso!, which began airing in October 2019. She was also part of the voice actor unit Hocho Sanshimai for the series. She also voiced Miyuri Yukari in Magia Record. In April 2022, Iida was among 34 voice actors joining Nobuhiko Okamoto's newly-formed agency Raccoon Dog. She also appeared as a guest DJ at Gekirock DJ Party in March 2024.

In March 2024, it was announced Iida would star as Kotone Fujita, a major character of Gakuen Idolmaster, a spinoff of The Idolmaster franchise. Her Idolmaster singles, "Sekaiichi Kawaii Watashi" and "Yellow Big Bang!", charted respectively at #31 and #21 at the Oricon Digital Singles Chart, as well as #37 and #21 at the Billboard Japan Download Songs Chart.

In August 2024, Iida starred as Riko Yokoya in the You Are Ms. Servant anime; this was her first time playing a major character in an anime. She also starred as Dia Nox in the 2026 short anime series I Want You To Show Me Your Panties With a Disgusted Face R.

Iida's special skills are singing and food reporting, and she holds the Japanese Word Processing Proficiency Test Pre-2nd Grade and the Presentation Creation Proficiency Test 2nd Grade qualifications. Her native dialect is the Hakata dialect. She has two older brothers, a fact that helped her relate to her role as Riko.

== Filmography ==
=== Television animation ===
Year	Title	Role	Ref.
2019	Tenka Hyakken: Meiji-kan e Yōkoso!	Sukashi Masamune	
2022	Shikimori's Not Just a Cutie	Schoolgirl	
2024	You Are Ms. Servant	Riko Yokoya	
2026	I Want You To Show Me Your Panties With a Disgusted Face R	Valmina Dia Nox	
2027	Booty Royale: Never Go Down Without a Fight!	Nene Kori	
2027	Reincarnation in the Game World Dan-Katsu	Lana	

=== Video games ===
Year	Title	Role	Ref.
2021	Cookie Run: Kingdom	Chess Choco Cookie	
2021	Magia Record	Miyuri Yukari	
2024	Gakuen Idolmaster	Kotone Fujita	
2025	Silver and Blood	Acappella	
2025	Trails in the Sky 1st Chapter	Tita Russell	
2026	Stella Sora	Tyrant-chan	
2026	BanG Dream! Our Notes	Kanata Sawami	

== Discography ==
Title	Year	Peak chart positions		Album
Title	Year	JPN Dig.	JPN DL	Album
"Sekaiichi Kawaii Watashi" (世界一可愛い私)	2024	31	37	Non-album singles
"Yellow Big Bang!"	2024	21	21	Non-album singles
"—" denotes releases that did not chart or were not released in that region.
