= Masumi Tazawa =

Japanese voice actress

- 田澤 茉純
- Born: November 22, 1993 (age 32); Kanagawa Prefecture, Japan
- Occupation: Voice actress
- Years active: 2013–present
- Agent: Tokyo Actor's Consumer's Cooperative Society
- Height: 149 cm (4 ft 11 in)

Masumi Tazawa (田澤 茉純, Tazawa Masumi; born November 22, 1993) is a Japanese voice actress. She is affiliated with Tokyo Actor's Consumer's Cooperative Society.

== Filmography ==
=== Anime series ===
- Invaders of the Rokujouma!? (2014), Kiriha Kurano
- Monthly Girls' Nozaki-kun (2014), Female Student; Heroine; Senpai
- Food Wars! (2015), Female University Student B
- The Idolmaster Cinderella Girls: 2nd Season (2015), Ayame Hamaguchi
- Mikagura School Suite (2015), Student; Woman
- School-Live! (2015), Female Student B
- Senki Zesshō Symphogear GX (2015), Phara Suyūf
- Tantei Kageki Milky Holmes TD (2015), Nobles
- Valkyrie Drive: Mermaid (2015), Kasumi Shigure
- World Break: Aria of Curse for a Holy Swordsman (2015), Salesperson
- Yamada-kun and the Seven Witches (2015), Rika Saionji, Jun Inose
- Your Lie in April (2015), Nagi's Friend
- Classroom of the Elite (2017), Chiaki Matsushita
- Re:Stage! Dream Days♪ (2019), Mizuha Ichikishima
- Didn't I Say to Make My Abilities Average in the Next Life?! (2019), Pauline
- Is the Order a Rabbit? BLOOM (2020), Rei
- Umamusume: Pretty Derby Season 2 (2021), Ikuno Dictus
- Peach Boy Riverside (2021), Sleep Ogre
- Platinum End (2021), Fuyuko Kohinata
- Shinkalion: Change the World (2024), Shion Goryōkaku
- Nina the Starry Bride (2024), Anne
- My Hero Academia: Vigilantes (2025), East Naruhata High Dance Squad Captain
- Nukitashi the Animation (2025), Tōka Reizeiin
- The Banished Court Magician Aims to Become the Strongest (2025), Clasia Annerose
- Jack-of-All-Trades, Party of None (2026), Luna Flockheart
- Hell Teacher: Jigoku Sensei Nube (2026), Misaki
- Because I, the True Saint, Was Banished, That Country Is Done For! (2027), Eliane

=== Original video animation ===
- Yamada-kun and the Seven Witches (2015), Rika Saionji, Jun Inose, Nene Odagiri Fanclub Member C, Female Student
- Your Lie in April (2015), Sawa

=== Video games ===
- Koi Q Bu! (2014), Ayatsuji Serika
- Onsoku Shōjotai Photon Angels (2015), Judy, Ema
- Fire Emblem if (2015), Belka
- Yomecolle (2015), Kurano Kiriha
- Yuki Yuna Is a Hero: Hanayui no Kirameki (2017), Masuzu Aki
- Alice Gear Aegis (2018), Anna Usamoto
- Onsen Musume (2018), Kei Tamatsukuri
- Guilty Gear Strive (2021), Erica Bartholomew
- Azur Lane (2020), Chapayev
- Heaven Burns Red (2022), Seira Sakuraba
- Bunny Garden 2 (2026), Miuka

=== Web Radio ===
- Radio Dot I Tazawa Masumi no gohan ōmori + 50 yen (AG-ON： June 4 – September 26, 2014)
- "Yamada-kun and the Seven Witches" Web Radio "Listener-kun and the Two Witches" (Animate TV: March 27 – July 3, 2015)
