= Meiji Gekken: 1874 =

Japanese anime television series

- Key visual

明治撃剣－1874－
- Genre: Historical
- Created by: Tsukasa Sakurai; Naoki Tozuka
- Anime television series
- Directed by: Jin Tamamura
- Produced by: Ben Cook
- Written by: Naoki Tozuka
- Music by: Shūji Katayama
- Studio: Tsumugi Akita Animation Lab
- Licensed by: Crunchyroll
- Original network: BS Shochiku Tokyu
- Original run: January 14, 2024 – March 24, 2024
- Episodes: 10

Meiji Gekken: 1874 (明治撃剣－1874－) is an original Japanese anime television series created by Tsukasa Sakurai and Naoki Tozuka and animated by Tsumugi Akita Animation Lab. It is directed by Jin Tamamura and written by Tozuka, with Naru Nishikori and Masayori Komine designing the characters and Shūji Katayama composing the music. It aired from January 14 to March 24, 2024, on BS Shochiku Tokyu. Crunchyroll streamed the series as part of its Crunchyroll Originals label.

== Plot ==
Set against the backdrop of the Boshin War or Japanese Revolution of 1868, the story follows Shizuma Origasa, a young disillusioned samurai who gets caught up in the power play between the Restorationists who want to preserve the old order and the Imperialists who want to drag Japan towards modernisation and industrialisation. Woven into this power struggle are scheming politicians, Western businessmen, double agents, yakuza, disgruntled former samurai, and various other self-interested parties who try to exploit the chaotic situation. Meanwhile, Shizuma joins the ill-equipped and inexperienced police force who try to maintain justice and order.

== Characters ==
Shizuma Origasa (折笠静馬, Origasa Shizuma)
Voiced by: Yuichi Nakamura
An impoverished former samurai of the Aizu Domain who works as a rickshaw puller in the city of Edo. He embarks on a quest to locate his missing fiancée, Sumie Kanomata, after obtaining a position in the newly established Imperial police force.
Kyōshirō Shuragami (修羅神狂死郎, Shuragami Kyōshirō)
Voiced by: Satoshi Mikami
A proficient silver-haired swordsman who wears a patch over one eye. He was a Shounai Domain samurai, formerly known as Ikegami Souichirou. He joins the Moriya Clan to pursue his own agenda and take revenge on Buhei Hiramatsu.
Sumie Kanomata/Hinazuru (鹿又澄江 / 雛鶴, Kanomata Sumie/Hinazuru)
Voiced by: Tomoyo Kurosawa
The sister of Shuragami's best friend who asked him to look after her. The sole survivor of a massacre of women by the samurai-turned Imperial officer Masaomi Kuramoto during the Boshin War, she becomes the geisha "Hinazuru" to bring down those in the Meiji government responsible for such atrocities.
Senri Kuroki (黒木せんり, Kuroki Senri)
Voiced by: Lynn
A biracial red-haired woman and trained kunoichi employed by British Ambassador Parks as a spy using her disguise skills and Eurasian features. Her primary false identity is "Mary Blackwood", an Englishwoman and freelance reporter for an Edo newspaper.
Buhei Hiramatsu (平松武兵衛, Hiramatsu Buhei)
Voiced by: Kazuhiro Yamaji
A fair-haired Western man whose real name is John Henry Schnell. A former Western military advisor to the Aizu clan, he has since become the powerful boss of an opium syndicate in Edo. He is also the secret overlord of the Moriya and Fujishima clans and their criminal enterprises.
Ryūzō Moriya (守屋龍三, Moriya Ryūzō)
Voiced by: Katsuhisa Hōki
The scheming head of the Moriya Clan in business with Hiramatsu but who also tries to cheat him. He employs Shuragami to do his dirty work, which causes friction within his clan.
Toshiyoshi Kawaji (川路利良, Kawaji Toshiyoshi)
Voiced by: Nobuo Tobita
The very principled Chief Superintendent of the Edo police who sees the potential in Shizuma and convinces him to join the police force.
Gorō Fujita (藤田五郎, Fujita Gorō)
Voiced by: Kazuyuki Okitsu
A cold blooded and neatly dressed young man who works undercover for the Metropolitan Police. He is also an excellent swordsman
Koume (小梅)
Voiced by: Miyuki Satō
The innocent friend of Hinazuru who has no knowledge of her past nor current mission.
Koto Nakazawa (中澤琴, Nakazawa Koto)
Voiced by: Mie Sonozaki
A superb Shinchougumi swordswoman who uses a twin blade technique.
Junpei Midorikawa (緑川順平, Midorikawa Junpei)
Voiced by: Daisuke Kasuya
Dario (ダリオ)
Voiced by: Ruriko Aoki
A young christian and highly gifted archer who works for Shuragami.
Genshō (幻丞)
Voiced by: Takashi Matsuyama
An old buddhist man who works for Shuragami.
Guen (愚円)
Voiced by: Takehiro Hasu
A huge man who usually wears a fox mask and works for Shuragami as an enforcer.
Toshimichi Ōkubo (大久保利通, Ōkubo Toshimichi)
Voiced by: Shunsuke Sakuya
Minister of the Interior of Japan, One of the three great nobles of the restoration.

== Episodes ==
No.	Title	Directed by (Note: Information is taken from the ending credits of each episode.)	Written by	Storyboarded by	Original release date
1	"Tokyo"; Transliteration: "Tōkyō" (Japanese: 東京)	Jin Tamamura	Naoki Tozuka	Naomichi Yamato	January 14, 2024
Following victory over their opposition, the new Japanese government tries to hold onto power against pockets of resistance. A group of samurai rebels attack and wound Iwakura Tomomi, the Minister of the Right. Rickshaw puller Shizuma Origasa is accused of being involved because the lead assailant, Takechi, rode in his rickshaw. Meanwhile, Kyoushirou Shuragami, attends a gambling session at the Douyama Clan's premises, also attended by Takechi. Shuragami causes a ruckus when he exposes them for cheating and when he is attacked outside, he and his small band teach the clan a lesson. While trying to clear his name, Shizuma confronts Takechi, impressing Chief Superintendent, Kawaji, who offers Shuragami a job in the police force.
2	"Way of the Streets"; Transliteration: "Tosei" (Japanese: 渡世)	Jin Tamamura	Naoki Tozuka	Naomichi Yamato	January 21, 2024
Shizuma is having trouble settling into the policeman role, and gets involved in an altercation with some bullying Chindai military men. Shuragami looks to join the Moriya Clan but they turn him away. He wipes out the Douyama Clan to earn Moriya's respect and he joins them. A woman calling herself Mary Blackwood, an English reporter, interviews Takechi in jail where she extracts from him that a geisha supplied information about Tomomi's schedule and provided a pistol. In town, the geisha Hinazuru seeks more weaponry. Etou Shinpei, former councilor arrives in town to achieve a peaceful political solution, but the warrior class in Saga have taken up arms hoping he will led them against the government. Meanwhile, Shuragami offers to punish a Chindai who beat up a Moriya worker at the same time as the Chindai attack the police barracks to free one of their own. Shuragami and Shizuma find themselves fighting together against the Chindai.
3	"Hunters"; Transliteration: "Karyūdo" (Japanese: 狩人)	Tomio Yamauchi	Naoki Tozuka	Naomichi Yamato	February 4, 2024 (Note: Episode 3 was released on Crunchyroll a week before its broadcast in Japan, which was postponed on BS Shochiku Tokyu.)
The episode focuses on the well-connected Zenbei Kuraya, formerly known as the samurai Masaomi Kuramoto. He has formed a "hunting club" and makes a pastime of killing women at night. Sumie Kanomata, now calling herself Hinazuru was the sole survivor of a massacre of women by Kuraya and his forces in the past. Shizuma find out about Kuraya's murderous activities and he and his friend Hidenobu Osanai go after Kuraya themselves without authorization. They come across Kuraya and his club hunting Hinazuru's friend Koume. Together with police reinforcements who arrive later, they capture Kuraya and his associates, however Kuraya is later shot and killed from a distance by Hinazuru. To close the chapter on "hunting club's" activities, the Goro Fujita is sent to kill the last remaining member as he flees by train.
4	"Gekken"; Transliteration: "Gekken" (Japanese: 撃剱)	Yuuichi Abe; Michiru Itabisashi	Tokio Nazuka	Yuuichi Abe	February 18, 2024 (Note: Episode 4 was released on Crunchyroll 2 weeks before its broadcast in Japan, which was postponed on BS Shochiku Tokyu.)
Shuragami is formally accepted into the Moriya Clan and is immediately tasked with representing the clan in the Gekkenkai, a fencing tournament using wooden swords. Meanwhile, Shizuma is assigned to collecting stray dogs for disobeying orders, but comes across the body of swordsman Tachibana Youjirou who had been invited to the tournament but was slain by someone with a twin swords technique. Shizuma is assigned to investigate the tournament undercover as a competitor. Hiramatsu is concerned that Moriya is cheating him on his opium export business and decided to punish him. He sends Dario, a young archer and the old man Genjou to ambush a cargo of contraband and frame the Moriya Clan for the attack. After the preliminary rounds of the Gekkenkai, eight contestants remain: Shizuma Origasa, Kyōshirō Shuragami, skilled swordswoman Koto Nakazawa who uses twin swords, the huge Kaijigorou Raigan, the westerner Blaze Miller, the middle-aged Koutarou Takarai, the experienced and fast swordsman Komasa Shimazu and the unassuming Goro Fujita.
5	"Fight to the Death"; Transliteration: "Shitō" (Japanese: 死闘)	Yuuichi Abe	Tokio Nazuka	Yuuichi Abe	February 25, 2024
In the first round of the Gekkenkai, Shizuma faces Kaijigorou Raigan the ex-sumo wrestler, both armed with wooden swords. The swords break and are switched for steel swords with agreement by the contestants. When these are both broken, they fight with bare hands and Shizuma wins. The next match is between Blaze Miller who fights with a jumonji-yari spear and swordswoman Koto Nakazawa. He is overconfident and anxious to win, and is soon defeated by Nakazawa. Rain interrupts the tournament. That night, Hinazuru tries to poison Shuragami, but fails although Shuragami is slightly poisoned. The next day, Koutarou Takarai, armed with a sickle and chain faces swordsman Goro Fujita. Although Takarai has a more versatile weapon, Fujita manages to stab and kill him. Next, a slightly weakened Shuragami faces Komasa Shimazu, who although he is fast, is beaten by Shuragami's twin sword technique. Meanwhile, officer Makino has been hired to kill Shuragami and enlists the aid of Hidenobu Osanai to ambush him. The plan fails and Osanai is wounded by Shuragami but killed by Makino. At the Gekkenkai, Shizuma faces Nakazawa whom she defeats without drawing blood.
6	"Surprise Attack"; Transliteration: "Shūgeki" (Japanese: 襲撃)	Michiru Itabisashi	Tokio Nazuka	Naomichi Yamato	March 3, 2024
Outside the Gekkenkai Nakazawa and Shizuma both admit they held back in the contest, and Shizuma confesses he is a policeman investigating a murder. Makino tells Shizuma of his friend Osanai's death by the sword of Shuragami and Shizuma angrily enters the Gekkenkai arena and attacks Shuragami. Shizuma is wounded but they are interrupted by Goro Fujita who claims Shuragami is his opponent and he eventually wins the bout. Koume finally finds Hinazuru and tells her that Shizuma is alive. Hiramatsu suspects that Shuragami is behind the conflict between the Moriya and Fujishima clans. Kurogi is discovered as she investigates the evacuation of monks who may be know the location a large quantity of gold, but is saved by Fujita. At the peace conference between Moriya and Fujishima, Hiramatsu exposes Shuragami's real identity, provoking an all out battle between Shirugami and Hiramatsu's men. Guen sacrifices himself to save Shirugami, and when Shirugami appears trapped with Dario and Gensho, Fujita bursts into the compound with a horse-drawn wagon to rescue them.
7	"Fateful Bonds"; Transliteration: "Innen" (Japanese: 因縁)	Fumihiro Ueno	Tokio Nazuka	Jin Tamamura	March 10, 2024
After Fujita saves Shirugami, Dario and Gensho, Shirugami invites him to join them against Buhei Hiramatsu. He explains that six years earlier, after the Satchou Alliance defeated the Shogunate, the victors declared war on the Shounai and Aizu to extend their domination of Japan. The Aizu military advisor at the time was a westerner given the name Buhei Hiramatsu who suggested they seek the aid of the Prussian military and pressured Souichirou Ikegami's father into ceding the Enzo region controlled by the Aizu and Shounai in exchange. When they heard news aboard the Prussian ship that both clans had capitulated to the new government, Hiramatsu killed Ikegami and his retainers to keep the agreement secret and wounded Souichirou who fell overboard after losing an eye. He was rescued and later formed a band with Dario, Gensho and Guen. Fujita agrees to join him. Meanwhile, Shizuma learns that Sumie is alive and goes to find her but she has gone to the horse races with a gun, planning to murder Toshimichi Okubo.
8	"Furious Clashes"; Transliteration: "Manjitomoe" (Japanese: 卍巴)	Yuuichi Abe; Kang Tae-Sik; Park Si-Hu	Tokio Nazuka	Yuuichi Abe	March 17, 2024
At the racetrack, Sumie attempts to shoot Okubo in revenge for autrocities committed in "Boshin", but Shizuma leaps in front and is shot instead. There are explosions and Sumie escapes in the confusion. The police learn that Hiramatsu is behind the attack and plans to unite the Satsuma against the government. Meanwhile, Hiramatsu pleads with Katamori Matsudaira, the former Aizu domain lord, to lead a revolt against the government but he is noncommittal. While investigating a minor news story of a disappearing moon and a rain of wooden carp, Senri Kuroki comes across Moriya's drug factory, and finds Gensho inside who was captured while watching the building. Kuroki frees Gensho while Shuragami leads his small band in an attack on the facility. At the same time, Moriya's men take the contraband out in wagons and set the factory alight, attracting the attention of Shizuma and Makino. Shuragami fails to find Hiramatsu and as the survivors flee the burning building Shizuma accuses Shuragami of killing Osanai, but he in turn accuses Makino. When Shizuma confronts Makino, he stabs Shizuma who survives the attack and arrests Makino.
9	"Night Skies"; Transliteration: "Yoruten" (Japanese: 夜天)	Park Jae-Ik	Tokio Nazuka	Yuuichi Abe	March 24, 2024 (Note: Episodes 9 and 10 air back-to-back on BS Shochiku Tokyu.)
Shizuma delivers Makino to police headquarters where Chief Superintendent, Kawaji informs him that Sumie shot at Okubo on orders from Hiramatsu and convinces Shizuma to rejoin the police force. Even though the former Aizu lord does not support him, Hiramatsu proceeds with his plan to overthrow the government. Mary Blackwood meets Fujita and in the woods to give him information about the planned revolt but they are seen by Dario who shoots Fujita with an arrow even though he has lost his right arm following the failed attack on Moriya's factory. Kawaji promotes Shizuma to first officer and Nakazawa decides to go back home and gifts one of her swords to him. Shizuma and a squad of police raid Hiramatsu' camp. Shuragami, Dario, Gensho also arrive, and Gensho uses his hallucinogenic smoke to frighten the troops, but Shizuma resists its effects and cuts Gensho with Nakazawa's sword. The dying Gensho sets off an explosion, killing himself and preventing the troops from following Shuragami. The British Embassy receives information which indicates that there will be an attack at night via hot balloon on the heavily fortified Imperial Palace. As night falls, Shuragami leaps aboard one of the balloons as they take off towards the palace and Shizuma follows them on foot.
10	"The River Never Stops, Nor Carries The Same Water Twice"; Transliteration: "Yuku Kawa no Nagare wa Taezu Shite, Shikamo Moto no Mizu ni Arazu" (Japanese: ゆく河の流れは絶えずして、しかももとの水にあらず)	Pank San-Ho	Tokio Nazuka	Jin Tamamura; Yuuichi Abe	March 24, 2024
Okubo learns that the samurai Saigou was assassinated, presumably by Hiramatsu to stir up anti-government feeling among the Satsuma samurai. Meanwhile, as Hiramatsu's supporters drift towards the Imperial Palace in hot air balloons, Shizuma manages to climb aboard one, and Fujita brings down Moriya's balloon with an arrow. Shuragami forces Moriya to confess that Hiramatsu is waiting on a ship offshore for his men to return with the Emperor. However, the plan is foiled when Shizuma confronts Hiramatsu's men as they land, accompanied by Sumie. Kawaji arrives with more men and Shizuma grabs Sumie and flees with her, insisting that he wants to be with her for who she is. Moriya arrives back home to find only his lieutenant, Ginji Gotou, heavily bandaged from his severe burns, but he kills his disgraced leader. Shizuma and Sumie appeal to Katamori Matsudaira to not seek revenge for the Aizu, but they are interrupted by Hiramatsu's swordsman who fires a shot, killing Sumie just as Shizuma spears his sword into his assailant. Both Shuragami and Shizuma separately board Hiramatsu's ship, with Shuragami being attacked by an opium induced Gotou while Shizuma attacks Hiramatsu. They both defeat their opponents, and Shizuma tries to arrest Shuragami so they fight it out on deck. Hiramatsu's last act is to stagger out and shoot and kill Shuragami. During the closing credits, Koume shows her newborn daughter named Sumie, and Shizuma leaves the police force to find his own peace.

== Easter Egg ==
Each episode contains a code puzzle designed by Nick Tierce, with the last episode requiring the solutions to the 9 preceding episodes.
