= Because I, the True Saint, Was Banished, That Country Is Done For! =

Japanese light novel series

- First light novel volume cover

真の聖女である私は追放されました。だからこの国はもう終わりです (Shin no Seijo de Aru Watashi wa Tsuihō Saremashita. Dakara Kono Kuni wa Mō Owari Desu)
- Genre: Fantasy
- Novel series
- Written by: Shikiso Utsuzawa
- Published by: Shōsetsuka ni Narō
- Original run: June 16, 2020 – present
- Light novel
- Written by: Shikiso Utsuzawa
- Illustrated by: Pukyunosuke
- Published by: Kodansha
- Imprint: Kodansha Ranobe Books
- Original run: February 2, 2021 – present
- Volumes: 7
- Manga
- Written by: Shikiso Utsuzawa
- Illustrated by: Mokuba Matsu
- Published by: Kodansha
- English publisher: NA: Kodansha USA
- Imprint: KCx
- Magazine: Palcy; Artemis by Sirius
- Original run: April 19, 2021 – present
- Volumes: 13
- Anime television series
- Directed by: Tsukasa Sakurai
- Written by: Naoki Tozuka
- Music by: Kanako Hara
- Studio: Tsumugi Akita Animation Lab
- Original run: January 2027 – scheduled
- icon

Because I, the True Saint, Was Banished, That Country Is Done For! (Note: Japanese: 真の聖女である私は追放されました。だからこの国はもう終わりです, Hepburn: Shin no Seijo de Aru Watashi wa Tsuihō Saremashita. Dakara Kono Kuni wa Mō Owari Desu) is a Japanese web novel series written by Shikiso Utsuzawa. It originally began serialization on the online publication platform Shōsetsuka ni Narō in June 2020. Kodansha later began publishing it as a light novel under its Kodansha Ranobe Books imprint in February 2021, with illustrations by Pukyunosuke; seven volumes have been published as of December 2024. A manga adaptation illustrated by Mokuba Matsu began serialization in April 2021, and has been compiled into 13 volumes as of July 2026. An anime television series adaptation produced by Tsumugi Akita Animation Lab is set to premiere in January 2027.

== Plot ==
Eliane, the Kingdom of Belkheim's saint and fiancée to the prince Claude, is suddenly banished from the kingdom after he falls in love with another woman named Leticia. Eliane is disappointed, knowing that Belkheim would likely fall into trouble in her absence, but decides to move to the neighboring kingdom of Linchigham. Along the way, she meets Nigel, a prince of Linchigham, who quickly grows attached to her. Meanwhile, without Eliane and her powers, Belkheim quickly falls into misfortune.

== Characters ==
Eliane (エリアーヌ, Eriānu)
Voiced by: Masumi Tazawa
The Kingdom of Belkheim's saint and Claude's former fiancée. Claude broke off his engagement to her, supposedly due to her ineffectiveness as a saint, but in reality due to his new relationship with Leticia. She ends up leaving for Linchigham while hiding her identity as a former saint. After her departure, the barrier that previously protected Belkheim disappeared, allowing a dragon to invade the kingdom.
Nigel Linchigham (ナイジェル・リンチギハム, Naijeru Rinchigihamu)
Voiced by: Taku Yashiro
The crown prince of the Kingdom of Linchigham, whom Eliane encounters during her departure from Belkheim. He quickly falls for her after she healed him and his party after a behemoth attack, and invites her to stay with him at the royal palace.
Claude (クロード, Kurōdo)
The first prince of the Kingdom of Belkheim and Eliane's fiancé. Despite being in a relationship, he was constantly unfaithful and often bullied her. He broke off his engagement to her in order to commit to his relationship with Leticia, but this leads to the kingdom falling into misfortune.
Leticia (レティシア, Retishia)
Claude's new fiancée, who is declared Belkheim's new saint after Eliane is banished.

== Media ==
=== Light novels ===
Shikiso Utsuzawa originally began serializing the series on the online publication platform Shōsetsuka ni Narō on June 16, 2020. It was later picked up for publication by Kodansha, which began publishing it as a light novel under their Kodansha Ranobe Books imprint with illustrations by Pukyunosuke. The first volume was released on February 2, 2021; seven volumes have been released as of December 26, 2024.

No.	Release date	ISBN
1	February 2, 2021	978-4-06-521825-9
2	July 2, 2021	978-4-06-524526-2
3	March 2, 2022	978-4-06-526876-6
4	August 2, 2022	978-4-06-529271-6
5	May 2, 2023	978-4-06-531811-9
6	May 2, 2024	978-4-06-535654-8
7	December 26, 2024	978-4-06-538204-2

=== Manga ===
A manga adaptation illustrated by Mokuba Matsu began serialization on Kodansha's Palcy service on April 19, 2021. It is also currently serialized in Kodansha's digital Artemis by Sirius magazine following the magazine's launch on May 29, 2025. The first tankōbon volume was released on October 29, 2021; thirteen volumes have been released as of July 30, 2026. The series is licensed in English by Kodansha USA, which released its first digital volume on March 12, 2024, and also began a physical release under its Kodansha Print Club program on March 31, 2026. The manga is also serialized in English on Kodansha's K Manga service.

No.	Original release date	Original ISBN	English release date	English ISBN
1	October 29, 2021	978-4-06-524690-0	March 12, 2024 (digital); March 31, 2026 (print)	978-1-68-491352-7 (digital); 979-8-88-877771-8 (print)
2	January 28, 2022	978-4-06-526370-9	April 9, 2024 (digital); May 26, 2026 (print)	978-1-68-491398-5 (digital); 979-8-88-877772-5 (print)
3	May 30, 2022	978-4-06-527628-0	May 14, 2024 (digital); July 28, 2026 (print)	978-1-68-491530-9 (digital); 979-8-88-877773-2 (print)
4	October 28, 2022	978-4-06-528993-8	July 9, 2024 (digital)	979-8-88-933456-9 (digital)
5	March 30, 2023	978-4-06-530656-7	September 24, 2024 (digital)	979-8-88-933464-4 (digital)
6	August 30, 2023	978-4-06-532524-7	November 12, 2024 (digital)	979-8-88-933521-4 (digital)
7	January 30, 2024	978-4-06-534156-8	March 11, 2025 (digital)	979-8-88-933649-5 (digital)
8	June 28, 2024	978-4-06-535690-6	July 15, 2025 (digital)	979-8-89-478131-0 (digital)
9	November 29, 2024	978-4-06-537387-3	October 14, 2025 (digital)	979-8-89-478464-9 (digital)
10	April 30, 2025	978-4-06-539080-1	January 13, 2026 (digital)	979-8-89-478466-3 (digital)
11	September 30, 2025	978-4-06-540639-7	May 12, 2026 (digital)	979-8-89-478467-0 (digital)
12	February 27, 2026	978-4-06-542393-6	—	—
13	July 30, 2026	978-4-06-544155-8	—	—

=== Anime ===
An anime television series adaptation was announced on July 23, 2026. The series will be produced by Tsumugi Akita Animation Lab and directed by Tsukasa Sakurai, with Naoki Tozuka handling series composition, Naru Nishikori designing the characters, and Kanako Hara composing the music. It is set to premiere in January 2027.
