= Living It Up in Another World Until I Get Bored =

Japanese light novel series

- First light novel volume cover (Hero Bunko edition)

異世界道楽に飽きたら (Isekai Dōraku ni Akitara)
- Genre: Fantasy, isekai
- Novel series
- Written by: Fudaya Sanmongarasu
- Published by: Shōsetsuka ni Narō
- Original run: June 5, 2016 – present
- Light novel
- Written by: Fudaya Sanmongarasu
- Illustrated by: Tomozo
- Published by: Shufunotomo
- English publisher: NA: Hanashi Media
- Imprint: Prime Novels (2017–2018); Hero Bunko (2019–present)
- Original run: June 21, 2017 – present
- Volumes: 2 (Prime Novels); 7 (Hero Bunko)
- Manga
- Written by: Fudaya Sanmongarasu
- Illustrated by: Imageworks Studio
- Published by: Shufunotomo
- Magazine: Hero Comics
- Original run: September 29, 2023 – present
- Manga
- Written by: Fudaya Sanmongarasu
- Illustrated by: SAA
- Published by: Shufunotomo
- Imprint: Hero Comics
- Magazine: Hero Comics
- Original run: July 2, 2025 – present
- Volumes: 1
- Anime television series
- Original run: January 2027 – scheduled

Living It Up in Another World Until I Get Bored (Japanese: 異世界道楽に飽きたら, Hepburn: Isekai Dōraku ni Akitara) is a Japanese light novel series written by Fudaya Sanmongarasu and illustrated by Tomozo. It began serialization online in June 2016 on the user-generated novel publishing website Shōsetsuka ni Narō. It was later acquired by Shufunotomo, who have published seven volumes since June 2017 under their Prime Novels and Hero Bunko imprints. A webtoon adaptation produced by Imageworks Studio has been serialized online via Shufunotomo's Hero Comics manga website since September 2023, and a manga adaptation with art by SAA began serialization on the same website in July 2025 and has been collected in a single digital volume. An anime television series adaptation is set to premiere in January 2027.

== Media ==
=== Light novel ===
Written by Fudaya Sanmongarasu, Living It Up in Another World Until I Get Bored initially began serialization on the user-generated novel publishing website Shōsetsuka ni Narō on June 5, 2016. It was later acquired by Shufunotomo who began publishing the series with illustrations by Tomozo under their Prime Novels light novel imprint on June 21, 2017, and it was later transferred to the Hero Bunko imprint on January 31, 2019. Seven volumes have been released as of October 31, 2024.

In August 2026, Hanashi Media announced that they had licensed the series for English publication.

No.	Original release date	Original ISBN	English release date	English ISBN
1	June 21, 2017 (Prime Novels); January 31, 2019 (Hero Bunko)	978-4-07-424728-8 (Prime Novels); 978-4-07-436849-5 (Hero Bunko)	May 9, 2027	979-8-953136-08-2
2	April 20, 2018 (Prime Novels); February 28, 2019 (Hero Bunko)	978-4-07-429631-6 (Prime Novels); 978-4-07-436921-8 (Hero Bunko)	—	—
3	March 30, 2019	978-4-07-437033-7	—	—
4	September 30, 2020	978-4-07-445618-5	—	—
5	February 28, 2022	978-4-07-450795-5	—	—
6	September 29, 2023	978-4-07-455999-2	—	—
7	October 31, 2024	978-4-07-460983-3	—	—
8	November 30, 2026	978-4-07-465408-6	—	—

=== Webtoon ===
A webtoon adaptation produced by Imageworks Studio began serialization on Shufunotomo's Hero Comics manga website on September 29, 2023.

=== Manga ===
A manga adaptation illustrated by SAA began serialization on the same website on July 2, 2025. The manga's chapters have been compiled into a single digital volume as of September 2026.

No.	Release date	ISBN
1	September 30, 2026	—

=== Anime ===
An anime television series adaptation was announced on November 13, 2026. It is set to premiere in January 2027.
