= Reincarnation in the Game World Dan-Katsu =

Japanese light novel series

- Reincarnation in the Game World Dan-Katsu: Game Addict Plays "Encouragement for Job Hunting in Dungeons" From a "New Game"
- First light novel volume cover

ゲーム世界転生〈ダン活〉～ゲーマーは【ダンジョン就活のススメ】を 〈はじめから〉プレイする～ (Gēmu Sekai Tensei <Dan-Katsu>: Gēmā wa [Dungeon Shūkatsu no Susume] o <Hajime kara> Purei Suru)
- Genre: Isekai
- Novel series
- Written by: Kaede Nishikigi
- Published by: Kakuyomu
- Original run: January 3, 2021 – present
- Light novel
- Written by: Kaede Nishikigi
- Illustrated by: Shuri
- Published by: TO Books
- Imprint: TO Bunko
- Original run: March 10, 2022 – present
- Volumes: 16
- Manga
- Written by: Kaede Nishikigi
- Illustrated by: Hiroshi Asagi
- Published by: TO Books
- Imprint: Corona Comics
- Magazine: Corona EX
- Original run: April 25, 2022 – present
- Volumes: 5
- Anime television series
- Directed by: Nagisa Miyazaki
- Written by: Yūji Kobayashi
- Studio: Studio Massket
- Original run: January 2027 – scheduled
- icon

Reincarnation in the Game World Dan-Katsu: Game Addict Plays "Encouragement for Job Hunting in Dungeons" From a "New Game" (Japanese: ゲーム世界転生〈ダン活〉～ゲーマーは【ダンジョン就活のススメ】を 〈はじめから〉プレイする～, Hepburn: Gēmu Sekai Tensei <Dan-Katsu>: Gēmā wa [Dungeon Shūkatsu no Susume] o <Hajime kara> Purei Suru) is a Japanese light novel series written by Kaede Nishikigi and illustrated by Shuri. It began serialization online in January 2021 on Kadokawa's user-generated novel publishing website Kakuyomu. It was later acquired by TO Books, who have published 16 volumes since March 2022. A manga adaptation with art by Hiroshi Asagi has been serialized online via TO Books' Corona EX manga service since April 2022 and has been collected in five tankōbon volumes. An anime television series adaptation produced by Studio Massket is set to premiere in January 2027.

== Plot ==
Set in the world of the role-playing game Dungeon Job Hunting Recommendation ("DanKatsu"), a game known for its 1,021 job classes and more than 400 possible endings, a dedicated player known by the username Zephyrus is reincarnated into the game as its protagonist. Using his extensive knowledge of the game's mechanics, he enrolls in Labyrinth Academy, the main school where students train and explore dungeons.

With the goal of obtaining the powerful Hero class, Zephyrus quickly advances by selecting optimal classes and acquiring rare items, while also helping his timid childhood friend. Assembling a group of powerful allies, he sets out to conquer dungeons that have never been cleared before.

== Characters ==
Zephyrus (ゼフィルス, Zefirusu)
Voiced by: Yūto Uemura
Hanna (ハンナ, Han'na)
Voiced by: Ayaka Nanase
Sierra (シエラ, Shiera)
Voiced by: Kotone Izumi
Lana (ラナ, Rana)
Voiced by: Hikaru Iida
Ester (エステル, Esuteru)
Voiced by: Chihaya Asakura

== Media ==
=== Light novel ===
Written by Kaede Nishikigi, Reincarnation in the Game World Dan-Katsu: Game Addict Plays "Encouragement for Job Hunting in Dungeons" From a "New Game" began serialization online on Kadokawa's user-generated novel publishing website Kakuyomu on January 3, 2021. It was later acquired by TO Books who began publishing it with illustrations by Shuri under their TO Bunko light novel imprint on March 10, 2022. Sixteen volumes have been released as of August 2026.

No.	Release date	ISBN
1	March 10, 2022	978-4-86699-467-3
2	June 10, 2022	978-4-86699-534-2
3	September 10, 2022	978-4-86699-662-2
4	November 10, 2022	978-4-86699-701-8
5	May 10, 2023	978-4-86699-842-8
6	August 10, 2023	978-4-86699-918-0
7	November 20, 2023	978-4-86794-009-9
8	February 15, 2024	978-4-86794-093-8
9	May 10, 2024	978-4-86794-172-0
10	August 20, 2024	978-4-86794-290-1
11	November 15, 2024	978-4-86794-364-9
12	March 19, 2025	978-4-86794-512-4
13	July 19, 2025	978-4-86794-636-7
14	December 15, 2025	978-4-86794-807-1
15	March 15, 2026	978-4-86794-920-7
16	August 15, 2026	978-4-86854-097-7

=== Manga ===
A manga adaptation illustrated by Hiroshi Asagi began serialization on TO Books' Corona EX manga service on April 25, 2022. The manga's chapters have been compiled into five tankōbon volumes as of October 2025.

No.	Release date	ISBN
1	September 1, 2022	978-4-86699-659-2
2	May 15, 2023	978-4-86699-846-6
3	February 15, 2024	978-4-86794-088-4
4	November 15, 2024	978-4-86794-356-4
5	October 1, 2025	978-4-86794-717-3

=== Anime ===
An anime television series adaptation was announced on March 11, 2026. It will be produced by Studio Massket and directed by Nagisa Miyazaki, with series composition and scripts handled by Yūji Kobayashi. The series is set to premiere in January 2027. The opening theme song is "Play the Play", performed by MindaRyn, and the ending theme song is "My Life Story", performed by Linkl Planet.

== Reception ==
By March 2026, the series has over 3.5 million copies in circulation.
