= Booty Royale =

Japanese manga series

- Booty Royale: Never Go Down Without a Fight!
- First tankōbon volume cover, featuring Misora Haebaru

はぐれアイドル 地獄変 (Hagure Aidoru Jigoku-hen)
- Genre: Comedy; Martial arts
- Manga
- Written by: Rui Takato
- Published by: Nihon Bungeisha
- English publisher: NA: Seven Seas Entertainment
- Magazine: Bessatsu Manga Goraku (2014); Manga Goraku Special (2015–2025); Goraku Web! (2025–present)
- Original run: April 25, 2014 – present
- Volumes: 19
- Live-action film
- Directed by: Tsuyoshi Shōji
- Produced by: Hijiri Hanada; Takahiro Ono
- Written by: Tsuyoshi Akama; Masato Nishi
- Music by: Yu Mamada
- Studio: Sedic Deux
- Released: September 12, 2020
- Runtime: 106 minutes
- Anime television series
- Directed by: Takashi Andō
- Written by: Eeyo Kurosaki
- Music by: ZincP
- Studio: Raiose
- Original run: January 2027 – scheduled
- icon

Booty Royale: Never Go Down Without a Fight!, known in Japan as Hagure Idol: Jigoku-hen (はぐれアイドル 地獄変, Hagure Aidoru Jigoku-hen; 'Stray Idol's Picture of Hell'), is a Japanese ecchi manga series written and illustrated by Rui Takato. It was serialized in Nihon Bungeisha's Bessatsu Manga Goraku in 2014 before being transferred over to Manga Goraku Special, where it ran from 2015 to 2025 and continued on the Goraku Web! manga website. A live-action film adaptation opened in Japan in September 2020. An anime television series adaptation produced by Raiose is set to premiere in January 2027.

== Plot ==
Misora Haebaru is an 18-year-old karate expert from Okinawa who decides to move to Tokyo in order to realize her dream of becoming a famous singer. When she arrives there, however, she discovers that her handlers have tricked her into joining the adult entertainment industry. As such, Misora is forced to participate in a martial arts tournament where she has to fight 100 opponents. If she loses, she must have sex with them.

== Characters ==
Misora Haebaru (南風原 海空, Haebaru Misora)
Voiced by: Hisako Tōjō
Sarah Goujima (豪島 セーラ, Gōjima Sēra)
Voiced by: Nao Shiraki
Chae Yoon-Hee (チェ・ユニ, Che Yuni)
Voiced by: Natsumi Murakami
Nene Kori (桑折 嶺音, Koori Nene)
Voiced by: Hikaru Iida

== Media ==
=== Manga ===
Written and illustrated by Rui Takato, Booty Royale: Never Go Down Without a Fight! was first serialized in Nihon Bungeisha's Bessatsu Manga Goraku from April 25, 2014, to December 25 of that same year, when the magazine ceased its publication. The manga was then transferred over to Manga Goraku Special, where it began serialization on March 10, 2015. The magazine last print issue was released on July 15, 2020, and went online starting on August 15 of that same year. Nihon Bungeisha has collected its chapters into individual tankōbon volumes. The first volume was released on November 19, 2014. As of April 28, 2026, nineteen volumes have been released.

In July 2022, Takato announced on Twitter that he was retiring from drawing manga, though it was unclear whether this was permanent or temporary—his wording suggested both possibilities. He stated that Booty Royale would go on hiatus, citing personal circumstances that made it difficult to continue drawing a manga focused on "boobs and sex." However, he left open the possibility of resuming work if his situation changed. Takato expressed satisfaction with the series as a hybrid "softcore porno" and "battle" manga, noting its consistent sales, but admitted his motivation to continue was low due to production challenges. The last chapter before entering on hiatus was released on September 15, 2022. The series returned from its hiatus on March 15, 2024. Manga Goraku Special ended publication on May 15, 2025, and the series moved to the Goraku Web! manga website starting on June 20 of that same year.

The manga is licensed in North America by Seven Seas Entertainment under their Ghost Ship mature imprint in two-in-one omnibus edition.

A spin-off series, titled Hagure Idol Jigoku-hen Gaiden: Princess Sarah (はぐれアイドル地獄変外伝 プリンセス・セーラ, Hagure Aidoru Jigoku-hen Gaiden Purinsesu Sēra), was serialized on the online platform Goraku Egg in 2015. Its chapters were collected in a single volume released on February 19, 2016.

==== Volumes ====
No.	Original release date	Original ISBN	English release date	English ISBN
1	November 19, 2014	978-4-537-13224-3	July 27, 2021	978-1-64827-491-6
1. "The Gate of the Hell"; 2. "It's A-a-amazon!" (アマゾンダダダ!!, Amazon Dadada!!); 3. "Singing Queen"; 4. "Crimson Red" (朱ーAKA－, Aka); 5. "On a Quiet Night" (静かな夜に, Shizuka na Yoru ni); 6. "Whisper of a Flower" (花のささやき, Hana no Sasayaki); 7. "Active Heart" (アクティブ・ハート, Akutibu Hāto)
2	October 19, 2015	978-4-537-13346-2	July 27, 2021	978-1-64827-491-6
8. "Viva Girls' Alliance" (Viva！おんなのこ同盟, Viva! Onnanoko Dōmei); 9. "The Last Element"; 10. "Hero of the Ring" (土俵の英雄, Dohyō no Eiyū); 11. "You're Like Me" (君は僕に似ている, Kimi wa Boku ni Niteiru); 12. "Naked Mind"; 13. "Pure Girl's Territory" (聖少女領域, Seishōjo Ryōiki); 14. "Green Fruit" (青い果実, Aoi Kajitsu)
3	September 9, 2016	978-4-537-13482-7	November 16, 2021	978-1-64827-495-4
15. "Ci-ne-ma" (シ・ネ・マ, Shi Ne Ma); 16. "Lone Star"; 17. "Lord of the Speed"; 18. "Full Force"; 19. "XTC"; 20. "Glass Doll" (硝子ドール, Garasu Dōru); 21. "The Paints of an Angel" (天使の絵の具, Tenshi no Enogu); Bonus: "Goddess of Boobs Lovers! Ch. 2" (乳神ラヴァーズ！第2話, Chichigami Ravāzu! Dai 2 Wa)
4	January 10, 2017	978-4-537-13532-9	November 16, 2021	978-1-64827-495-4
22. "Angel Addict"; 23. "Love Affair"; 24. "Violence of Flame" (炎のバイオレンス, Honō no Baiorensu); 25. "Samurai"; 26. "Mama, I Love You"; 27. "Heavy Rotation" (ベビーローテンション, Hebī Rōtenshon); 28. "Remember 16"; Bonus: "Goddess of Boobs Lovers! Ch. 3" (乳神ラヴァーズ！第3話, Chichigami Ravāzu! Dai 3 Wa)
5	June 8, 2017	978-4-537-13593-0	March 29, 2022	978-1-64827-507-4
29. "Pretty Gravure Girl"; 30. "Secrets Please~"; 31. "Through The Night"; 32. "0 or ∞ ~Love or Unlimited~"; 33. "Something Like Love"; 34. "Let Me Protect You..."; 35. "Hunter of Justice"
6	January 29, 2018	978-4-537-13685-2	March 29, 2022	978-1-64827-507-4
36. "Boy Heart"; 37. "Women Are Better, After All"; 38. "Be Free"; 39. "-Across The Line-"; 40. "Light Fire To Your Smoldering Heart!"; 41. "Island Where The Wind Sleeps"; 42. "Start. Dash!!"
7	August 18, 2018	978-4-537-13795-8	September 27, 2022	978-1-63858-324-0
43. "War War! Stop It"; 44. "A Moment's Opportunity"; 45. "Pain"; 46. "Farewell, Respectfully Yours."; 47. "Second Flight"; 48. "Beautiful Wolves"; 49. "Dead Set"
8	February 18, 2019	978-4-537-13882-5	September 27, 2022	978-1-63858-324-0
50. "Love Slave"; 51. "Rice is a Side Dish"; 52. "Fall in Love, and You'll be Powerful!"; 53. "Boy"; 54. "Dead or Alive"; 55. "Can't Even Breathe"; 56. "Tale of Passion"
9	July 29, 2019	978-4-537-13949-5	December 13, 2022	978-1-63858-738-5
57. "The Genius Comes at the End"; 58. "Machine Tornader!"; 59. "Waza-Ari!!"; 60. "To the Strong"; 61. "Oh! Miss Tough"; 62. "Jump"; 63. "The Victors' Elegy"
10	March 28, 2020	978-4-537-14223-5	December 13, 2022	978-1-63858-738-5
64. "Fighters"; 65. "You May Dream"; 66. "Love Friend Style"; 67. "Beginning"; 68. "Rock Candy"; 69. "Truth"; 70. "Crimson Loneliness"
11	September 28, 2020	978-4-537-14288-4	March 12, 2024	978-1-68579-503-0
71. "Power"; 72. "Man, God, Machine"; 73. "Rise, Headmaster of Rage!"; 75. "Awaken the Power"; 76. "Passionate Days"; 77. "Storm"; 78. "Can't Get Enough"
12	March 29, 2021	978-4-537-14356-0	March 12, 2024	978-1-68579-503-0
78. "Over The Top!"; 79. "The Invincible!"; 80. "Turnabout Rock 'N' Roll!"; 81. "Black Hole"; 82. "Happiness Always Comes Late"; Bonus Story: "Murai-kun Wants to Fuck Mizuno-kun, Part One"; "Part Two"
13	September 29, 2021	978-4-537-14413-0	July 2, 2024	979-8-88843-054-5
83. "Wonderful World"; 84. "Heart to Heart"; 85. "Black Diamond"; 86. "Can't Stop"; 87. "Across Years"; 88. "Burn, Fighting Spirit, Overcome Cruel Fate"; 89. "The Same Planet"
14	March 28, 2022	978-4-537-14488-8	July 2, 2024	979-8-88843-054-5
90. "Morning of the Trip"; 91. "Labyrinth"; 92. "Secret Ambition"; Side Story 1: "Fallen Angel Blue"; Side Story 2: "Princess Sara Is Back (Just for Now): Get the Win"; Side Story 3: "Do Be Careful, Utako-chan!"; Side Story 4: "Do Be Deranged, Utako-chan!"
15	August 19, 2022	978-4-537-14536-6	October 8, 2024	979-8-88843-410-9
93. "In Endless Desire"; 94. "Lady Fighter!"; 95. "Where Dreams Are"; 96. "A Woman's Fruit"; 97. "Cry No More"; 98. "Superdimensional DNA"
16	November 28, 2022	978-4-537-14573-1	October 8, 2024	979-8-88843-410-9
99. "Flesh-2X9-Rock 'N' Roll"; 100. "Snow Halation"; 101. "Perfect Mission"; 102. "Destiny of Gathering"; 103. "The Future is Like the Wind"; 104. "Take Care"
17	November 28, 2024	978-4-537-14927-2	June 14, 2026	979-8-89561-785-4
18	August 18, 2025	978-4-537-17279-9	June 14, 2026	979-8-89561-785-4
19	April 28, 2026	978-4-537-17389-5	—	—

=== Live-action film ===
A live-action film adaptation, directed by Tsuyoshi Shōji at Sedic Deux and starring Rina Hashimoto as Misora, premiered in Japan on September 12, 2020.

=== Anime ===
An anime television series adaptation produced under WWWave Corporation's Deregula anime label was announced on November 6, 2026. The series will be produced by Raiose and directed by Takashi Andō, with Eeyo Kurosaki writing scripts and handling series composition, Ryūji Iwata designing the characters, and ZincP composing the music. It is set to premiere in January 2027.
