= Tsumugi Akita Animation Lab =

Japanese animation studio

Tsumugi Akita Animation Lab Co., Ltd

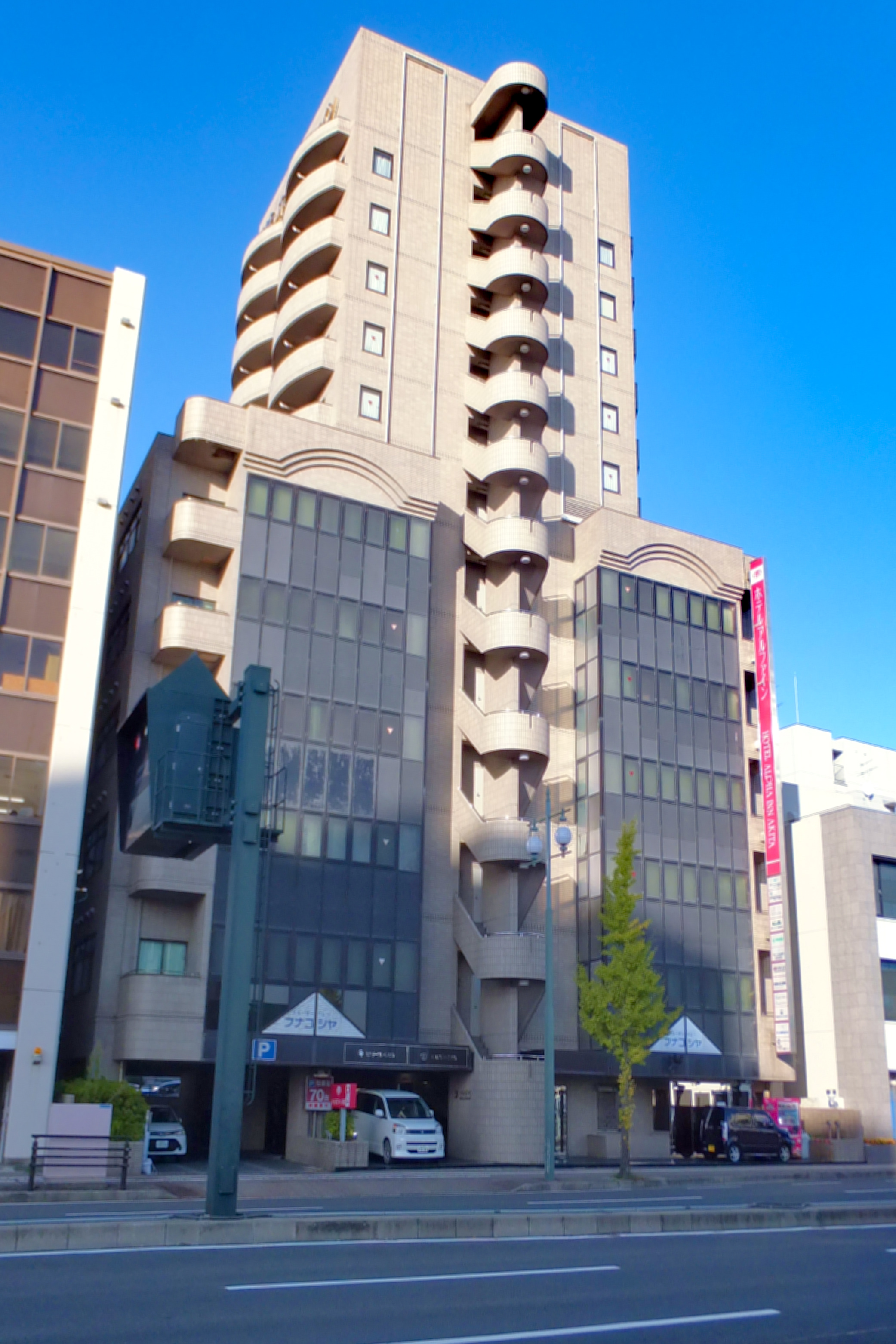
- Headquarters in Asahikita, Akita
- Native name: 株式会社つむぎ秋田アニメLab
- Romanized name: Kabushiki-gaisha Tsumugi Akita Anime Rabu
- Formerly: Tsumugi Animation Research Institute Co., Ltd. (2017-2020)
- Type: Private KK
- Industry: Animation studio
- Founded: April 3, 2017; 9 years ago
- Founder: Tsukasa Sakurai
- Headquarters: Asahikita, Akita City, Akita Prefecture, Japan
- Website: https://www.tsumu-sakuga.com/

Tsumugi Akita Animation Lab Co., Ltd. (株式会社つむぎ秋田アニメLab, Kabushiki-gaisha Tsumugi Akita Anime Rabu) is a Japanese animation studio founded in 2017 by Tsukasa Sakurai, a former animator at Satelight and Graphinica. Its headquarters are in Akita City, Akita Prefecture while having another studio in Minamiguchi, Kawaguchi, Saitama Prefecture.

== Works ==
=== Television series ===
| Title | Director(s) | First run start date | First run end date | Eps | Note(s) | Ref(s) |
|---|---|---|---|---|---|---|
| Meiji Gekken: 1874 | Jin Tamamura | January 14, 2024 | March 24, 2024 | 10 | Original work. | |
| I Was Reincarnated as the 7th Prince so I Can Take My Time Perfecting My Magical Ability | Jin Tamamura | April 2, 2024 | June 18, 2024 | 12 | Based on the light novel series by Kenkyo na Circle. | |
| I Was Reincarnated as the 7th Prince so I Can Take My Time Perfecting My Magical Ability (season 2) | Jin Tamamura | July 10, 2025 | September 25, 2025 | 12 | Second season of I Was Reincarnated as the 7th Prince so I Can Take My Time Perfecting My Magical Ability. | |
| Because I, the True Saint, Was Banished, That Country Is Done For! | Tsukasa Sakurai | January 2027 | TBA | TBA | Based on the light novel series by Shikiso Utsuzawa. | |

=== Films ===
| Title | Director(s) | Release date | Note(s) | Ref(s) |
|---|---|---|---|---|
| Ryūsatsu no Kyōkotsu | Tsukasa Sakurai | March 26, 2021 | Original work Official entry for the Agency of Cultural Affairs' 2021 Anime no Tane program. | |
