= Aoharu Once More =

Japanese manga series

- Cover of the volume

アオハル・ワンスモア (Aoharu Wansumoa)
- Genre: Boys' love
- Manga
- Written by: Toworu Miyata
- Published by: ShuCream
- English publisher: NA: Tokyopop
- Imprint: from RED COMICS
- Magazine: from RED
- Original run: August 16, 2024 – April 18, 2025
- Volumes: 1
- Manga

Aoharu Once More: The Lovers' Arc
- Written by: Toworu Miyata
- Published by: ShuCream
- Magazine: from RED
- Original run: June 17, 2026 – present
- Anime television series
- Directed by: Rikako Machida
- Music by: Morrigan (Wave)
- Studio: Imagica Infos; Imageworks Studio
- Original network: TV Tokyo
- Original run: January 2027 – scheduled

Aoharu Once More (Japanese: アオハル・ワンスモア, Hepburn: Aoharu Wansumoa) is a Japanese manga series written and illustrated by Toworu Miyata. It was serialized in ShuCream's from RED boys' love digital magazine from August 2024 to April 2025 and was collected in a single tankōbon volume released in June 2025. A sequel, titled Aoharu Once More: The Lovers' Arc, began serialization in the same magazine in June 2026. A "light anime" television series adaptation produced by Imagica Infos and Imageworks Studio is set to premiere in January 2027.

== Characters ==
Hayato Kobayashi (小林隼人, Kobayashi Hayato)
Voiced by: Tasuku Kaito
Ritsu Onishi (大西律, Onishi Ritsu)
Voiced by: Kazuki Ura

== Media ==
=== Manga ===
Written and illustrated by Toworu Miyata, Aoharu Once More was serialized in ShuCream's from RED boys' love digital magazine from August 16, 2024 to April 18, 2025. Its chapters were collected into a single tankōbon volume released on June 6, 2025. In March 2026, Tokyopop announced that they had licensed the series for English publication, with the volume being released on September 22, 2026.

A sequel, titled Aoharu Once More: The Lovers' Arc, began serialization in the same magazine on June 17, 2026.

No.	Original release date	Original ISBN	North American release date	North American ISBN
1	June 6, 2025	978-4-910526-79-9	September 22, 2026	978-1-42788-817-4

=== Anime ===
A "light anime" television series adaptation produced by AnimationID under the boys' love label Balloon was announced on September 3, 2026. The series will be animated by Imagica Infos and Imageworks Studio and directed by Rikako Machida, with Morrigan from Wave composing the music. It is set to premiere in January 2027 on TV Tokyo.
