= Laura Marcus (actress) =

English actress

- Born: Laura Alice Marcus
- Education: University of Bristol (BA); Royal Central School of Speech and Drama (MA)
- Years active: 2021–present

Laura Alice Marcus is an English actress. On television, she is known for her roles in the BBC remake of the series Bad Education (2022–2024) and The Jetty (2024).

== Early life and education ==
Laura Alice Marcus grew up in South West London and attended Kingston Grammar School. Her mother was involved in local community theatre at Hampton Hill Playhouse.

Marcus graduated with a Bachelor of Arts (BA) in Theatre Studies from the University of Bristol and a Master of Arts (MA) in Acting from the Royal Central School of Speech and Drama.

== Career ==
In 2020, while at home in the first lockdown implemented during the COVID-19 pandemic in the United Kingdom, Marcus wrote, directed and starred in the short film The Massive F*cking Bender, as part of the aptly named The Indoors Project online film festival; the festival posted the film on 3 May 2020. Marcus won the Best Writer award, at the February 2021 BFI Future Film Festival, for her work in the film.

She appeared as the character Jinx in British comedy series Bad Education. She had a role in 2023 adaptation of the Henry Fielding novel Tom Jones, and in Miss Scarlet and The Duke, a series about the first-ever female detective in Victorian-era London as the younger version of the character Eliza Scarlet, with the older version of the character played by Kate Phillips.

She also appeared in 2023 Michael Caine and Glenda Jackson film The Great Escaper. In 2024, she appeared as Caitlin in BBC One television drama series The Jetty alongside Jenna Coleman and Bo Bragason. That year, she also appeared as the daughter of Catherine de' Medici, portrayed by Samantha Morton in The Serpent Queen, and the second series of Amazon Prime Video drama The Devil's Hour, playing the younger version of the character Lucy (Jessica Raine). Marcus appeared in Disney+ science fiction series Andor.

In 2025, portrayed Mollie Garfield, the daughter of the 20th president of the United States James Garfield in the Netflix historical drama series Death by Lightning. That year, she joined the cast of The Hunger Games: Sunrise on the Reaping, and the live-action adaptation of the Assassin's Creed video game series.

== Filmography ==
Key
†	Denotes works that have not yet been released

=== Film ===
Year	Title	Role	Notes
2020	The Massive F*cking Bender	The Girl	Short film; also writer and director
2021	Girls' Night	Rhododendron	Short animated film
2022	Pull	Este	Short film
2023	The Great Escaper	Young Irene	
2026	Bloodsuckers	Molly	Short film
2026	Borscht	Masha	Short film
2026	The Hunger Games: Sunrise on the Reaping	Silka Sharp	

=== Television ===
Year	Title	Role	Notes
2022–2024	Bad Education	Jinx	Main cast; series 4–5
2022	Silent Witness	Mia Clarke	Episode: "History – Part Three"
2022	The Devil's Hour	Teenage Lucy	Episode: "DI Chambers"
2022	The Serpent Queen	Elisabeth	Recurring role; season 2
2023	Tom Jones	Susan	Limited series; main cast
2024	Miss Scarlet and The Duke	Young Eliza Scarlet	2 episodes
2024	The Jetty	Caitlin	Limited series; main cast
2025	Andor	Beela	3 episodes
2025	Death by Lightning	Mollie Garfield	Miniseries
2026	F**k Ups	Miracle June Jones	Main role; also creator and writer
TBA	Assassin's Creed†	TBA	Lead role; fliming

=== Other ===
Year	Title	Role	Notes
2021	Bomb Factory New Writing Showcase	London	Bush Theatre
2022	Metronomy EU Tour	Performer	With LYNKS
2022	Frank Carter & the Rattlesnakes UK Tour	Performer	With LYNKS
