= Metallic Rouge =

Japanese anime television series

- Key visual

メタリックルージュ (Metarikku Rūju)
- Genre: Mecha
- Created by: Bones; Yutaka Izubuchi
- Anime television series
- Directed by: Motonobu Hori
- Produced by: Naoto Shouji; Masahiko Minami
- Written by: Yutaka Izubuchi; Toshizo Nemoto
- Music by: Taisei Iwasaki; Yuma Yamaguchi; Towa Tei
- Studio: Bones
- Licensed by: Crunchyroll; SEA: Bilibili Medialink
- Original network: Fuji TV (+Ultra)
- Original run: January 11, 2024 – April 4, 2024
- Episodes: 13
- Manga
- Written by: Meika Tokyo; Chita Tsurushima
- Published by: Line Corporation
- Magazine: Line Manga
- Original run: March 7, 2024 – present
- icon

Metallic Rouge (メタリックルージュ, Metarikku Rūju) is a Japanese original anime television series produced by Bones for its 25th anniversary and directed by Motonobu Hori. The series aired on Fuji TV's +Ultra programming block from January to April 2024. A webtoon adaptation with art by Meika Tokyo and Chita Tsurushima began serialization online on Line Corporation's Line Manga website in March 2024.

== Plot ==
In the far future, following a war with aliens referred to as "Usurpers", humanity has colonized the inner Solar System and coexist with androids called "Neans", which were created using technology from another alien race known as "Visitors". However, they do not live equally, with the Neans being forced to live as second-class citizens whilst having Asimov's Laws programmed into them to keep them subservient.

Rouge Redstar, a Proto-Nean not bound by Asimov's Laws, and her human partner, Naomi Orthmann, are sent on a secret mission to assassinate nine other Proto-Neans, known as the "Immortal Nine", some of whom are hostile toward humanity. However, as her mission progresses and she learns more about the world, Rouge begins to question whether she is acting on her own initiative or she is just a pre-programmed "gear in the system".

== Characters ==
=== Ministry of Truth ===
A government institution in charge of the creation and oversight of all Neans; also known as Alethia.

Rouge Redstar (ルジュ・レッドスター, Ruju Reddosutā)
Voiced by: Yume Miyamoto (Japanese); Monica Flatley (English)
A highly advanced Nean, known as a "Proto-Nean", who looks identical to a normal human and lacks Asimov's Laws. She resembles a teenager though she is chronologically 10 years old, and she is somewhat poor at socializing. She is tasked with hunting down the Immortal Nine, with her already having slain two prior to the beginning of the story. Over time however, she questions whether she is truly "free".
Her battle form is a crimson suit of armor called Metal Rouge, dubbed the "Red Gladiator" by the media, and she fights with energy blades, which she can use as both melee and ranged weapons.
Naomi Orthmann (ナオミ・オルトマン, Naomi Orutoman)
Voiced by: Tomoyo Kurosawa (Japanese); Cassie Ewulu (English)
A Ministry of Truth member who was partnered with Rouge and tasked with supporting her mission. Although she has a somewhat troubled relationship with Rouge, who often misunderstands her remarks, she genuinely cares for her and is impressed by her progress as their journey continues. She is later revealed to be a spy for the Guardianship Bureau and the original Nean, codenamed First, created by the Visitors to be their intermediary with humanity.
Jean Yunghart (ジーン・ユングハルト, Jīn Yunguharuto)
Voiced by: Shunsuke Takeuchi
The vice-director of the Ministry of Truth and Rouge and Naomi's superior. He tasked them with hunting down the Immortal Nine, claiming it was revenge for them killing his adoptive father, who raised him and Rouge as siblings. However, in reality, it is to prevent them from sharing their ability to defy Asimov's laws with all Neans, which could result in mass chaos. He is later revealed to be a human-Nean hybrid born from the union of his mother, Eva Cristella, and Immortal Nine member Eden.
Eva Cristella (エヴァ・クリステラ, Eva Kurisutera)
Voiced by: Yoko Hikasa
Jean's mother who disappeared under mysterious circumstances seventeen years before the beginning of the series. She worked alongside Rouge's creator, Roy Yunghart, to invent the Neans and installed them with Asimov's Laws. However, she later came to regret this and created a program to overwrite Asimov's Laws called "Code Eve", hiding it within Rouge and the Immortal Nine members in hopes that they would undo her mistake.

=== Immortal Nine ===
A currently disbanded group of rogue Proto-Neans. While some members have settled down peacefully, others have joined the Nean terrorist organization Alter.

Jaron Fate (ジャロン・フェイト, Jaron Feito)
Voiced by: Hiroyuki Yoshino (Japanese); Landon McDonald (English)
A member of the Immortal Nine who currently works for Alter. He is a manipulative trickster who sets up scenarios to make his former associates fight Rouge for his entertainment. He was also the true culprit behind a string of murders that the public thinks Rouge committed, which he did by disguising himself as her.
His battle form is a yellow suit of armor resembling a jester called Hell Giallon and he wields energy chakrams, which he can control telepathically. He can also disguise himself as others by altering his appearance.
Sara Fitzgerald (サラ・フィッツジェラルド, Sara Fittsujerarudo)
Voiced by: Yū Shimamura (Japanese); Brandi Price (English)
A member of the Immortal Nine who abandoned her former identity and became a famous singer on Mars. However, she is dragged back into her old life when Rouge begins hunting her, unaware that she had unknowingly hired her as her assistant.
Her battle form was a purple suit of armor called Purgatory Viola and she wielded flamethrowers and detachable arms.
Afdal Bashal (アフダル・バシャール, Afudaru Bashāru)
Voiced by: Kenjiro Tsuda
A doctor specializing in treating Neans, known as a 'Tuner'. After meeting Rouge, he invited her to a Nean settlement to show her their impoverished living conditions. He is later revealed to be a member of the Immortal Nine, having grown nihilistic after seeing the Neans' struggles for freedom.
His battle form was a green suit of armor with blades for arms called Phantom Verde and he could produce a nerve gas from his body that induced hallucinations in others.
Eden Vallock (エデン・ヴァロック, Eden Varokku)
Voiced by: Kazuyuki Okitsu
An archeologist studying Usurper ruins, who crosses paths with Rouge and Naomi. He is later revealed to be a member of the Immortal Nine and Jean's biological father.
His battle form is a black suit of armor called Jet Black Noir and he can transform various body parts into laser cannons for him to wield.
Jill Sturgeon (ジル・スタージョン, Jiru Sutājon)
Voiced by: Yui Ogura
A freelance journalist who traveled to Mars to report on the discrimination that Neans face there. While there, she crossed paths with Rouge and Naomi and taught the former to be "free". She was later revealed to be a member of the Immortal Nine currently working for Alter, despising humanity for enslaving Neans using Asimov's Laws and wanting Rouge to join her cause.
Her battle form is a silver suit of armor called Flash Sylvia and her primary weapon is a spear. She can also move at super speed and regenerate lost body parts.
Ace Machias (アエス・マキアス, Aesu Makiasu) & Alice Machias (アリス・マキアス, Arisu Makiasu)
Voiced by: Minami Tsuda
Twins who cross paths with Rouge. Ace is a bookwormish boy while Alice is an athletic girl. They are later revealed to be members of the Immortal Nine who share a body, which Noid 262 likens to dissociative identity disorder. Only wishing to live a normal life, they search for Rouge seeking to come to a compromise.
Their battle form is an orange suit of armor called Double-Headed Aerkos and they have the ability of cryokinesis.
Graufon Berg (グラウフォン・ベルグ, Guraufon Berugu)
Voiced by: Hiroki Yasumoto
A member of the Immortal Nine who currently works for Alter. He possesses a knightly demeanor and favors fair and honorable fights. However, it is later revealed that he never truly believed in Alter's cause and only sided with them because he is in love with Jill.
His battle form is a grey suit of armor. He wields energy arms and can manipulate gravity.

=== Guardianship Bureau ===
Humanity's highest law enforcement agency; also known as Ochrona or the Protection Bureau.

Ash Stahl (アッシュ・スタール, Asshu Sutāru)
Voiced by: Atsushi Miyauchi
An investigator known for his strong intuition. He travels to Mars to pursue the spree of murders committed by the "Red Gladiator". As his investigation progresses, he becomes increasingly suspicious of the Ministry of Truth's secrets and the Bureau's corruption and eventually joins forces with Rouge after she agrees to help him.
Noid 262 (ノイド262, Noido 262)
Voiced by: Chiaki Kobayashi
Ash's Nean colleague. Though his straightforwardness somewhat strained their partnership and the fact that he had not yet grasped certain aspects of humanity, such as metaphors, he and Ash share a strong bond, though the latter refuses to admit it.

=== Carnival ===
A mysterious troupe of traveling performers touring the solar system who have connections to the Usurpers.

Puppet Master (人形遣い師, Ningyōtsukai-shi) / Roy Yunghart (ロイ・ユングハルト, Roi Yunguharuto)
Voiced by: Hiroshi Yanaka (Puppet Master), Yoshimitsu Shimoyama (Roy Yunghart)
The mysterious leader of the Carnival, who claims he seeks to free the Neans from Asimov's Laws. To this end, he seeks out Rouge and gradually makes her question whether she is truly "free". He is later revealed to be Jean's adoptive father and Rouge's creator, who was presumed to have been assassinated by the Immortal Nine, which is what prompted Jean to task Rouge with hunting down his killers; in truth, he faked his death and orchestrated the events of the entire series from the shadows.
Opera (オペラ)
Voiced by: Mariya Ise
The Puppet Master's subordinate. She is later revealed to actually be a Usurper in disguise and the true leader of the Carnival.
Cyan Bluestar (シアン・ブルースター, Shian Burūsutā)
Voiced by: Haruka Shiraishi
A mysterious Proto-Nean girl who targets Rouge and claims to be her younger sister. She is later revealed to be a clone of Rouge created by the Puppet Master. Initially depicted as cold and sadistic, this was actually due to her having been under brainwashing, and her true personality is far more childlike.
Her battle form is a blue suit of armor that strongly resembles Rouge in both appearance and abilities.

== Media ==
=== Anime ===
The original anime series by Bones was announced during the "Fuji TV Anime Lineup Presentation 2023" on March 22, 2023. It is directed by Motonobu Hori, with Yutaka Izubuchi as chief supervisor and in charge of series composition, Toshizo Nemoto as screenplay writer, Toshihiro Kawamoto as character designer, and Taisei Iwasaki, Yuma Yamaguchi, and Towa Tei as music composers. It aired on Fuji TV's +Ultra programming block from January 11 to April 4, 2024. (Note: Fuji TV lists the series premiere on January 10 at 24:55, which is effectively January 11 at 12:55 a.m. JST.) The opening theme song is "Rouge", performed by Yu-ka, while the ending theme song is "Scarlet", performed by Dazbee.

Crunchyroll streamed the series outside of Asia. Bilibili licensed the series in the region. Additionally, it is also streaming on Ani-One YouTube channels.

==== Episodes ====
No.	Title (Note: All English titles are taken from Crunchyroll.)	Directed by	Written by	Storyboarded by	Original release date
1	"Crimson is the Sound of Dawn"; Transliteration: "Kurenai wa Akatsuki ni Kanaderu" (Japanese: 紅は暁に奏でる)	Motonobu Hori	Toshizo Nemoto	Motonobu Hori, Yasushi Muraki	January 11, 2024 (Note: This episode aired at 1:25 a.m. JST, 30 minutes after the original air time on Fuji TV.)
In a Martian city, a mysterious man calling himself "Joker" hijacks a shipment of Nectar, a drug which Neans need to function. Elsewhere in the city, Rouge serves as assistant to famous singer Sarah Fitzgerald to determine if the latter is actually a member of the "Immortal Nine" whom she is tasked to kill. She is aided by a mechanical bird operated by Naomi which catches Sarah injecting herself with nectar, confirming she is indeed Viola Keane of the Immortal Nine. However, the "Joker" then destroys the bird, forcing Naomi to meet Rouge in person to report her findings. Meanwhile the "Joker", revealed to be Immortal Nine member Hell Giallon, warns Viola that Rouge is likely the culprit behind the deaths of two other of their members. Viola tries to lure Rouge into a trap, which results in both women transforming into their combat forms and engaging each other in combat. With data provided by Naomi, Rouge manages to defeat Viola and extract her core, but Giallon manages to escape. With Viola eliminated, Rouge and Naomi head off to their next mission.
2	"Wander in the Labyrinth"; Transliteration: "Tōsōmeiro" (Japanese: 逃走迷路)	Katsuya Shigehara	Kimiko Ueno	Motonobu Hori, Yasushi Muraki, Yutaka Nakamura	January 18, 2024 (Note: This episode aired at 1:10 a.m. JST, 15 minutes after the original air time on Fuji TV.)
Guardianship Bureau investigator Ash and his partner, Noid, travel to Mars to investigate a series of murders that Rouge apparently committed. Meanwhile, Rouge and Naomi board a bus toward the Martian city of Wellstown, joined by, amongst others, children Miquel and Emily, journalist Jill, and doctor Afdal. En route, Naomi tells Miquel and Emily how Neans were created using technology from aliens called "Visitors" to fight a war against another alien race called "Usurpers", but are bound by Asimov's Laws to prevent them from harming humans. However, they are suddenly attacked by mercenaries hired by Viola's wealthy ex-boyfriend to capture Rouge, forcing them to flee. They escape but the bus breaks down in a forest, prompting Naomi to scavenge nearby Usurper ruins for repair parts. Meanwhile, Rouge and Emily explore the forest and come across an archeologist named Eden, who is studying abandoned Usurper war machines. After accidentally reactivating the machines, the repaired bus is once again forced to flee while Rouge stays behind to combat the machines and mercenaries. In the end, Rouge emerges victorious and the bus picks her up afterward as it continues to Wellstown.
3	"Marginal City"; Transliteration: "Kyōkai no Machi" (Japanese: 境界の街)	Masayuki Otsuki	Toshizo Nemoto	Masayuki Otsuki	January 25, 2024
Arriving in Wellstown, Rouge and Naomi hand over Viola's core to their handler. Ministry of Truth vice-director, Jean, then gives the duo their next target, "Phantom Verde", who is hiding in Wellstown's Nean settlement. Meanwhile, Ash and Noid arrive in Wellstown but local police block their investigation, causing the former to suspect the Ministry's involvement. Back with Rouge, she and Naomi get into a fight when the latter states they are both just Ministry tools. Taking this as her independence being insulted, Rouge resolves to complete the mission solo and successfully enters the settlement after running into Afdal and his Nean assistant Rion, who work there. Shocked upon witnessing the settlement's impoverished living conditions, Rouge is then approached by a Nean named Juval, leader of the Council of Free Neans, who knows Rouge's true identity and asks her to become a symbol for their cause. Rouge decides to focus on Verde first but later finds Juval murdered, with other Neans promptly arriving on the scene, causing her to be the top suspect. In response, the police send a force to occupy the settlement while an unknown airship arrives at Wellstown.
4	"Freedom and Phantoms"; Transliteration: "Jiyū to Gen'ei to" (Japanese: 自由と幻影と)	Masamitsu Abe	Toshizo Nemoto	Satoshi Takafuji, Yasushi Muraki	February 1, 2024
The airship is carrying a traveling carnival as it lands in the city. Rouge is held by the CFN on suspicion of killing Juval, but she decides to stay put in order to draw out Phantom Verde. Naomi says she wants to help Rouge of her "free will," saying she isn't a tool of Alethia, and neither is she. In response, Rouge accepts Naomi's assistance. As the CFN interrogates Rouge, the Wellstown security force assaults the building, killing or arresting any CFN members they find. Naomi takes advantage of Ash's authority to enter the settlement, where she confronts Dumas. However, Dumas is actually Giallon in disguise, and he decides to spare Naomi before withdrawing. Rouge escapes the CFN headquarters with Rion, Afdal's Nean assistant, but she has already figured out Rion must be involved in Juval's death. Rion admits that he killed Juval so Afdal wouldn't have to follow Dumas' orders to kill him, only to be killed in turn by Afdal who reveals himself to be Phantom Verde. Rouge is initially at a disadvantage due to a combination of being drugged by Rion and impaired by nerve gas Afdal's body produces. However, she uses a blast to disperse the gas, allowing her to kill Phantom Verde and retrieve his core. Rouge then falls unconscious as a number of carnival members begin to march on the gates to the Nean settlement.
5	"Carnival Dances with Lost Memories"; Transliteration: "Kānibaru wa Bōkyaku to Odoru" (Japanese: カーニバルは忘却と踊る)	Takanori Yano	Noboru Takagi	Motonobu Hori, Masayuki Otsuki, Yasushi Muraki	February 8, 2024
Captured by the Carnival, Rouge has her mind probed by their leader, the Puppetmaster, and relives memories of her past with Jean, who instructed her to hunt down the Immortal Nine as revenge for them killing his father and her creator, Roy Yunghart. However, she begins having second thoughts, since both Viola and Afdal both showed remorse for their actions. The Puppetmaster then lets her go, stating that he wants her to find her own freedom. Meanwhile, Naomi teams up with Eden to infiltrate the Carnival's airship before parting ways. She discovers that the Carnival possesses Usurper technology and recovers Phantom Verde's core before reuniting with Rouge. However, they are then attacked by Puppetmaster's lieutenant, Opera, who demands Verde's core back. In the end, an unknown member of the Immortal Nine arrives and helps the duo by holding off the Carnival's forces, allowing them to escape. Meanwhile, the Carnival's ship takes off to its next destination, with the Puppetmaster being confident that he and Rouge will meet again. Afterward, Rouge and Naomi finally make up for their earlier fight while the Immortal Nine member, revealed to be Eden, watches them from afar.
6	"Nameless Guest"; Transliteration: "Namae ga Nai Marouto" (Japanese: 名前がない客)	Daisuke Chiba	Kimiko Ueno	Taizo Yoshida, Kenta Yokoya	February 15, 2024
Jean meets his superior, Chief Chau, who is aware of the unauthorized mission to kill the Immortal Nine but turns a blind eye and warns him of a Bureau spy within the Ministry. Meanwhile, Rouge and Naomi board a ship back to Earth, taking the opportunity to relax and befriend their cabin neighbors; twins Ace and Alice. However, Giallon has boarded the ship and begins murdering passengers at random using various shape-shifting disguises. Also on the ship, Ash and Noid take charge of the investigation but after Ash is wounded, Naomi takes over and deduces that since Giallon cannot alter his weight she and Rouge can track him down through the ship's manifest. After being discovered, Rouge and Giallon both transform into their combat forms and a fight ensues during which he reveals that he killed her creator, Roy Yunghart, before she throws him off the ship and he appears to burn up in Earth's atmosphere. Unbeknownst to Rouge, however, Ash learns of her true identity after witnessing her transform. Later, Rouge reunites with Naomi but the latter places her under arrest, revealing she is the Bureau spy.
7	"Appropriate Gear"; Transliteration: "Tadashī Haguruma" (Japanese: 正しい歯車)	Ikuro Sato	Tsukasa Kondo	Kentarō Kawajiri, Kenta Yokoya	February 22, 2024
Jean, who was relieved from his position and placed under house arrest, is questioned by Naomi about the Carnival's apparent plans regarding the Venus terraforming project, but he reveals nothing. She then attends a meeting with Chau and Bureau Director Kahn, where she reveals that she was given authority over Rouge's fate. Meanwhile, Rouge is broken out of confinement by Jill, who reveals herself to be "Flash Sylvia" from the Immortal Nine and a member of the Nean terrorist organization "Alter", wanting her to join them. Naomi responds by sending her private forces after them, leaving Rouge unsure whom to trust. Suddenly, she is rescued by the Immortal Nine member "Double-Headed Aerkos" who is revealed to be both Ace and Alice. They are found by Ash and Noid, who continue their investigation despite being dismissed and agree to shelter them in return for their cooperation. However, Ace/Alice leave after Rouge refuses to disobey Jean's orders. As Jean goes to investigate a security breach at his family home he is observed by a girl with blue-green hair. Elsewhere, Giallon is revealed to be alive and found by the Immortal Nine member Graufon.
8	"Nowhere House"; Transliteration: "Dokodemonai Ie" (Japanese: どこでもない家)	Masamitsu Abe	Noboru Takagi	Masamitsu Abe, Yasushi Muraki	February 29, 2024
As Jean arrives at his home, he runs into Rouge, Ash, and Noid, who are investigating Roy Yunghart's death. Jean leads them into a hidden basement housing recordings of Roy's memories where they learn that Rouge was actually created by Roy's assistant, Jean's "mother" Eva Cristella. She also developed a program called "Code Eve", which neutralizes Asimov's Laws, and embedded it in Rouge and the Immortal Nine. Jean then reveals that it was Roy's will that Rouge be sent after the Immortal Nine to prevent them from freeing Neans, which could result in mass chaos. As Rouge ponders this dilemma, she is confronted by the blue-haired girl, who introduces herself as Cyan, Rouge's younger sister, and challenges her but leaves after Rouge refuses to fight. Meanwhile, Alter forces, led by Silvia and Graufon, attack the Ministry of Truth to retrieve the cores of the slain Immortal Nine members. Jean's group arrives to help but Noid is accidentally killed by human forces. Rouge faces Jill and Graufon, disagreeing with their methods, and is soon joined by Eden, who introduces himself as "Jet Black Noir". However, as Rouge and Noir recommence the battle, Aerkos arrives while Cyan watches from nearby.
9	"The Ones Who Visited"; Transliteration: "Otozure Kita Monotachi" (Japanese: 訪れ来た者たち)	Masayuki Otsuki	Mitsuyasu Sakai, Toshizo Nemoto	Masayuki Otsuki, Yasushi Muraki	March 7, 2024 (Note: This episode aired at 1:05 a.m. JST, 10 minutes after the original air time on Fuji TV.)
Aerkos has seemingly sided with Alter and attacks Rouge. Jean attempts to aid her but he is captured by Graufon while Eden has his core removed by Silvia, returning him to human form. Alter then withdraws after giving Rouge an ultimatum: her core for Jean. Rouge attempts to give chase but is intercepted by Cyan. Although they are evenly matched, Rouge hesitantly follows Naomi's advice to synchronize with Cyan, causing a pulse that neutralizes their combat forms. Naomi takes Rouge to meet the Visitors who reveal Naomi is a Nean they created to be their intermediary with humanity. The Visitors reveal that they seek a new homeworld, giving humanity their technology in return for using the Neans to terraform Venus and to fight off their enemies, the Usurpers. Meanwhile, Alter heads for Venus where the Carnival has landed and Usurper forces invade from the outer Solar System. While the Visitors want Rouge to stay in isolation, Naomi convinces them to let her join the fight, prompting Rouge to forgive Naomi for her deceptions. Eden then arrives with Ash in his private spaceship and offers to take Rouge and Naomi to Venus.
10	"Family Portrait"; Transliteration: "Kazuoku no Shōzō" (Japanese: 家族の肖像)	Takanori Yano, Ikuro Sato	Kimiko Ueno	Akira Nishimori	March 14, 2024
Aboard Eden's ship on the way to Venus, Cyan is discovered stowing away. However, her personality has completely changed, with her now behaving like a child and wanting to be sisters with Rouge. Cyan reveals that she is a clone of Rouge that the Puppet Master created and that she only tried to kill her because a mysterious voice ordered her to. Rouge chooses to accept Cyan as she is, and the two girls begin to develop a sisterly bond, with her teaching the latter that she can make her own decisions. As Ash and Eden reminisce about their own pasts, Naomi realizes she is the only one without a "family". Meanwhile, Alter lands on Venus and is welcomed by the Carnaval. The Immortal Nine members then attend a "family" meal with Jean where they reveal their intentions to make him the leader of humanity after the Neans are freed and he later watches on as the Puppet Master extracts the Code Eve fragments from them. As Rouge's group approaches Venus, they detect a barrage of missiles being fired towards their ship.
11	"Target Planet"; Transliteration: "Nerawareta Hoshi" (Japanese: 狙われた星)	Daisuke Chiba, Mitsuyasu Sakai, Masayuki Otsuki	Tsukasa Kondo	Yutaka Kagawa	March 21, 2024
On Earth, Chau dissuades the human leaders from attacking Venus, having faith that Jean and the others will defeat Alter. Eden manages to hard land his ship on Venus, but the group is soon split up: Rouge with Naomi, and Eden and Ash with Cyan. Meanwhile, as Alter and the Carnaval discuss strategy, the Puppet Master claims to Jean that he is a former colleague of his mother. While the others battle Rouge's group, Ace/Alice are made Jean's guards but begin questioning their affiliation upon learning that Silvia ordered Giallon to assassinate Roy Junghart and that Jean tried to reason with Alter before resorting to sending Rouge after the Immortal Nine members. Elsewhere, Cyan hears the mysterious voice again and begins following its directions as Ash gives chase while Eden faces Graufon, who gives him back his core so that they can fight fairly. The voice is revealed to be the Puppet Master controlling Cyan and he manages to escape with her, though not before Ash sees him unmasked. Back with Rouge and Naomi, they are confronted by Giallon disguised as Jean.
12	"Mask Graveyard"; Transliteration: "Kamen no Hakaba" (Japanese: 仮面の墓場)	Ikuro Sato	Toshizo Nemoto	Takuya Igarashi	March 28, 2024
After a fierce battle, Eden kills Graufon while Jean convinces Ace and Alice to switch sides. They soon meet up with Eden and Ash, and Jean requests their help to stop the Puppet Master, referring to Eden as his "father". Elsewhere, Rouge and Naomi see through Giallon's disguise and follow him to Silvia, who seemingly kills Giallon following a disagreement. After once again turning down Silvia's offer to join Alter, Rouge fights her but is defeated and Silvia removes her core. This prompts Naomi to flee and attempt to implement the Visitors' contingency plan: destroying Venus using a self-destruct mechanism. However, after being taunted by Giallon, she finds herself unable to abandon Rouge and rushes back to her before transferring her own core into her to restore her power. Rouge and Naomi then once again confront Silvia and the Puppet Master while Jean and Eden try to stop Code Eve from transmitting. Ash, Ace, and Alice come to Rouge and Naomi's aid, and Ash exposes the Puppet Master's true identity as none other than Rouge's creator, Roy Yunghart.
13	"Code Eve"; Transliteration: "Kōdo Ivu" (Japanese: コード・イヴ)	Motonobu Hori	Toshizo Nemoto	Motonobu Hori, Akira Nishimori, Masayuki Otsuki, Yasushi Muraki	April 4, 2024
Roy Yunghart reveals his current body is a Nean clone into which he transferred his consciousness after masterminding his own assassination. He further reveals that he manipulated the Immortal Nine's memories and actions as part of his master plan for Neans to surpass humans. Angry at his deceptions, Silvia attacks and seemingly kills him. However, he transfers his consciousness into Cyan's body and slays Silvia in return. Rouge then faces Roy but is outmatched because she uses Naomi's core. Naomi decides to sacrifice herself by transferring her consciousness into Rouge, becoming her operating system and upgrading her battle mode. They proceed to kill Roy although this also fatally wounds Cyan, though she and Rouge manage to affirm their sisterhood in her final moments. Rouge decides to free the Neans but Opera, who is revealed to be an Usurper in disguise, hacks Code Eve to turn the Neans against Humanity. Fortunately, Jean already neutralized her sabotage and the program works as intended, prompting Opera to flee. Afterward, as the world adjusts to the freed Neans, Rouge and Naomi set out to hunt down Opera.

=== Webtoon ===
A webtoon adaptation with art by Meika Tokyo and Chita Tsurushima began serialization online on Line Corporation's Line Manga website on March 7, 2024.

== Reception ==
The series had a mixed reception. James Beckett of Anime News Network praised the first episode for an opening that drops viewers into one of the "heroes' missions, and only given...passing clues" to the plot, while criticizing it for lacking character development, but praised the cyberpunk vibes as "pitch perfect" and inspired by Ghost in the Shell and Blade Runner, and said the show was better for the characters who transform into "color-coded, tokusatsu inspired robot fighters." Nicholas Dupree of the same site praised the show designs, direction, animation, and music, the charm of Rouge when with Naomi, but criticized the writing and story for leaving "blank spaces" for the viewers. Rebecca Silverman criticized the plot for lacking, the murkiness of the Immortal Nine, and the risk that the show's story won't have anything "underneath these shiny trappings" while praising the fights as "slick," a story with a lot of "familiar elements" including a "stratified society," and the visuals. Similarly, Richard Eisenbeis argued that the episode purposely leaves viewers "with is a mountain of questions" by the end, praised the "cyberpunk Martian setting" and animation, and said he was willing to see what the show is about. Steve Jones, in reviews of episodes 1–5, praised the series as a "bombastic work" from Studio Bones with "some baroque worldbuilding", its utilization of visuals and subtext, but criticized the "clumsy" handling of tension between Rouge and Naomi, and being "more distant and inconsistent" than he would have liked.

Vrai Kaiser, reviewing the first episode for Anime Feminist, said the series will be "unquestionably be engaging from start to finish," praising the setting, casual racial diversity, action sequences, and engaging cast, but set their bar low for the series, while enjoying the "throwback 2000s sci-fi vibes" and bracing for "eventual narrative disappointment," but hoping the series proves them wrong. In a later post, also on Anime Feminist, the series was described as a cyberpunk series with "cool ladies and a Black co-protagonist" but criticized for using androids as a "discrimination stand-in," saying that "often gets dicey." Writing for the same site, Dee praised the first three episodes as entertaining while "fast-paced and thematically messy," but was critical of the fourth episode for quick plot twists, saying it had strong visuals and was well-staged, but lacked weight, and said she was losing reasons to watch, and gave content warnings for violence, state oppression, and "death/violence towards...adult and child androids...many of them dark-skinned...[and] women".

D. Morris reviewed episodes 1–10, of the series for Comics Beat. He described the first two episodes as "pure cyberpunk fun" and action, while criticizing the lack of character and narrative development. In reviews of episodes three and four, he praised more world-building and character development for Rouge Redstar, and noted the fifth episode felt "indebted to the work of Philip K. Dick." In later reviews, he described the big reveals as satisfying, style changes in the sixth episode which make a "fun diversion," while criticizing the seventh episode for not giving enough time to develop Rouge's character, and the eighth episode for being unsatisfying and answering mysteries through plot rather through characters or themes. In his last two episode reviews for the series, Morris praised the earned reunion between Rouge and Naomi in episode 9, and the "exploration of found family" in episode 10.

Joshua Fox of Screen Rant, reviewing the first few episodes, called the series a "masterpiece in the making," praising the visuals, animation, "fight choreography, and shot composition." Toussaint Egan of Polygon described the series as impressive, combining "a futuristic cyberpunk setting with tokusatsu-inspired action," and for weaving the show universe's specifics into the "dialogue and plot beats of its story," and called it "thoroughly entertaining and visually exhilarating." Reviewing the first episode for CBR, Sayantan Gayen described the series as a neo-noir anime which has "all the ingredients for a dystopian tale, but relies on action," and said it celebrated the spirit of "classic anime," while arguing that the characters endear themselves to the audiences. Julio Vélez wrote an article on Crunchyroll News that the series is a perfect way to celebrate the first 25 years of the animation studio Bones, said the series exceeded his expectations, with the story's composition and visual narrative working in tandem, and praising the voice cast. Matthew Magnus Lundeen, reviewing the first three episodes for Game Rant, said the series had a lot of potential, shared some similarities with Carole and Tuesday and Blade Runner, while criticizing the pacing and the story for falling into cliches, and praising the character interactions as "natural and engaging."
