= Inugami (manga) =

Japanese manga series

- First tankōbon volume cover, featuring 23 (left) and Fumiki Shimazaki (right) with a litter of inugami

犬神
- Genre: Action; Mystery; Science fantasy
- Manga
- Written by: Masaya Hokazono
- Published by: Kodansha
- English publisher: NA: Manga Planet (digital)
- Imprint: Afternoon KC
- Magazine: Monthly Afternoon
- Original run: July 25, 1996 – August 24, 2002
- Volumes: 14
- Manga

Inugami Re
- Written by: Masaya Hokazono
- Illustrated by: Aki Shimizu
- Published by: Line Corporation (digital); Asahi Shimbun Publications (print)
- Magazine: Line Manga
- Original run: October 14, 2020 – September 6, 2022
- Volumes: 4
- icon

Inugami (Japanese: 犬神; lit. 'Dog God') is a Japanese manga series written and illustrated by Masaya Hokazono. It was serialized in Kodansha's seinen manga magazine Monthly Afternoon from July 1996 to August 2002, with its chapters collected in 14 tankōbon volumes. The story is about a boy who finds an inugami, a dog god of Japanese mythology.

A revised and expanded version by Hokazono, titled Inugami Kai (Note: Japanese: 犬神・改), was serialized digitally in Leed Publishing's Leed cafe online platform, with its chapters collected in ten volumes. It was licensed for an English-language translation in North America by Manga Planet.

A remake of Inugami, titled Inugami Re (Note: Japanese: 犬神Re, Hepburn: Inugami rebirth) and illustrated by Aki Shimizu, was serialized digitally through Line Manga from October 2020 to September 2022, with its chapters collected in four volumes.

== Synopsis ==
An inugami dog can scarcely remember his past, only knowing that he has been ordered to spy on humans. Hosting a distinctive "23" tattooed on his ear, he has the ability to not only quickly recover from injuries but also grow spikes on his back. His abilities include, but are not limited to, passing on his power to anyone who happens to touch his blood. Unfortunately, his unusual power also attracts the attention of those interested in acquiring his power.

Having wandered into the city, the inugami finds himself in an abandoned building where Fumiki Shimazaki, a young aspiring poet, frequents. After listening to Fumiki's poetry for some time, the inugami befriends the boy and eventually learns to speak, much to Fumiki's surprise. Through their friendship, the inugami comes to realize that not all humans are bad. However, a pharmaceutical corporation soon learns of the inugami's existence. Realizing that the inugami's regenerating cells could lead to immortality, the corporation attempts and succeeds at acquiring his genes. Soon, the company ends up creating terrifying monsters. The inugami ends up in a fight with one of these monsters and, for a moment, questions the goodness of humans who have created these monsters. In that fleeting moment of doubt, a different inugami, with the intent to kill humans, appears.

== Characters ==
23
One of the main characters and an inugami that befriends Fumiki. Initially silent and animalistic, 23 develops human speech from listening to Fumiki's poetry. 23's exact origins are left ambiguous, but he emerged from the mountains with an internal command to "gaze upon man." Through his interactions with Fumiki and later Mika, 23 develops an appreciation for humanity.
As an inugami, 23 possesses a degree of control over his bodily structure, mostly manifesting in the form of spikes and horns. He is capable of recovering from otherwise fatal wounds, though it takes him longer compared to other inugami; an enormous gash in his stomach heals over in just a week. He is capable of communicating and spreading memories telepathically with other inugami, dogs, and eventually Fumiki, which later develops into a psychic link.
Fumiki Shimazaki (島崎 史樹, Shimazaki Fumiki)
The main human protagonist of the series, a high schooler who loves to read and write poetry. At the beginning of the series he is very shy and introverted, but he grows more confident as time goes on. He forms an emotional and later psychic bond with 23, and is frequently distressed when 23 cannot be located. After coming into contact with 23's blood during an encounter with the inugami Eight, he develops a healing ability similar to but slower than 23's.
Mika Harada (原田 美伽, Harada Mika)
Mika Harada is the childhood friend of Fumiki. In contrast to Fumiki, she's quite bold and extroverted. After following Fumiki to the abandoned building and nearly getting attacked by a mutated rat, Mika learns about 23 and bonds with him alongside Fumiki. Mika frequently feels "out of the loop" due to Fumiki's habit of running off without her to go find 23. At one point, she begins dating another student in her and Fumiki's class, but she quickly ditches him to hang out with Fumiki.
Kiryu (桐生)
The main antagonist of the series. A skilled clairvoyant gifted with powerful telepathy and precognition, Kiryu desires to use the inugami to access the mysterious otherworld Tokoyono for his own means.
Zero (ゼロ)
An inugami with black fur. Like 23, he emerged from the mountains with the instruction to "gaze upon man," though unlike 23 his impression of humanity is quickly soured by interactions with hunters and police officers. After massacring several civilians, 23 and Zero engage in a battle that culminates in Zero being beheaded. Still alive, Zero is taken in by Kiryu who, after pacifying Zero with a psychic projection of a torii gate, desires to use him to access Tokoyono.
Zero possesses body-modifying abilities similar to 23, but rather than horns he attacks with cnidocyte-lined tentacles that he uses to cut people to pieces.

== Publication ==
Written and illustrated by Masaya Hokazono, Inugami was serialized in Kodansha's seinen manga magazine Monthly Afternoon from July 25, 1996, (Note: Debuted in the magazine's September 1996 issue, which was released on July 25.) to August 24, 2002. (Note: Finished in the magazine's October 2002 issue, which was released on August 24.) Kodansha collected its chapters in fourteen tankōbon volumes, published from January 23, 1997, to November 22, 2002. Kodansha republished the series in seven bunkoban volumes from December 12, 2002, to February 8, 2003; a new edition in six volumes from October 10, 2008, to February 7, 2009; and the complete edition in four volumes from December 12, 2012, to March 13, 2013.

Hokazono later drew a revised and expanded version. Titled Inugami Kai, it was serialized digitally in Leed Publishing's Leed cafe online platform, with its chapters collected in ten volumes between March 28, 2017, and July 27, 2018. It was licensed for an English-language translation in North America by Manga Planet. 72 chapters were translated in total, from November 19, 2019, to July 23, 2020.

A remake of Inugami manga, titled Inugami Re and illustrated by Aki Shimizu, was serialized digitally through Line Manga in planned two parts. The first part ran from October 14, 2020, to September 6, 2022. Asahi Shimbun Publications collected its chapters in four volumes, published three tankōbon volumes from October 20, 2020, to March 18, 2022, and released the fourth volume digitally on October 2, 2023.

=== Volumes ===
No.	Release date	ISBN
1	January 23, 1997	978-4-06-314147-4
2	June 23, 1997	978-4-06-314153-5
3	November 21, 1997	978-4-06-314167-2
4	April 23, 1998	978-4-06-314178-8
5	September 22, 1998	978-4-06-314189-4
6	February 22, 1999	978-4-06-314199-3
7	July 22, 1999	978-4-06-314214-3
8	December 16, 1999	978-4-06-314226-6
9	April 21, 2000	978-4-06-314239-6
10	September 22, 2000	978-4-06-314250-1
11	February 22, 2001	978-4-06-314261-7
12	August 23, 2001	978-4-06-314271-6
13	May 23, 2002	978-4-06-314293-8
14	November 22, 2002	978-4-06-314308-9

=== Inugami Kai volumes ===
No.	Release date	ISBN
1	March 28, 2017	978-4-84-584983-3
2	April 28, 2017	978-4-84-584984-0
3	May 29, 2017	978-4-84-584985-7
4	July 28, 2017	978-4-84-584986-4
5	September 28, 2017	978-4-84-584987-1
6	November 29, 2017	978-4-84-585243-7
7	January 29, 2018	978-4-84-585274-1
8	March 28, 2018	978-4-84-585297-0
9	April 28, 2018	978-4-84-585314-4
10	July 27, 2018	978-4-84-585338-0

=== Inugami Re volumes ===
No.	Release date	ISBN
1	October 20, 2020	978-4-02-214289-4
2	March 22, 2021	978-4-02-214315-0
3	March 18, 2022	978-4-02-214338-9
4	October 2, 2023	—

== Reception ==
By 2020, Inugami Re manga had sold over 1.5 million copies in circulation.
