= Bloodsucker (disambiguation) =

A bloodsucker is an animal that practices hematophagy.

Bloodsucker may also refer to:

- Bloodsucker, an alternate term for a vampire
- Bloodsucker lizards, some agamid lizards of the genus Calotes
- The Bloodsucker beetle, Rhagonycha fulva

== Music ==
- Bloodsucker, a 1994 maxi-CD by Paralysed Age
- Bloodsuckers (The Varukers album)
- Bloodsuckers (Vamps album)
- "Bloodsucker", a Deep Purple song from the 1970 album Deep Purple in Rock
  - "Bludsucker", Deep Purple's remake of the song from the 1998 album Abandon
- "Bloodsucker", an Agnostic Front song from the 1998 album Something's Gotta Give
- "Bloodsucker", a song by A Day to Remember from the 2021 album You're Welcome
- "Bloodsuckers", a song by Die Krupps from the 1993 album II - The Final Option
- "Bloodsuckers", a song by Judas Priest from the 2001 album Demolition

== Films ==
- Bloodsuckers, alternative title of I Drink Your Blood
- Bloodsuckers, US title of 1971 film Incense for the Damned
- Bloodsuckers (1989 film), a film by Dejan Šorak
- Bloodsuckers (1997 film), a horror film by Ulli Lommel
- Bloodsuckers (2005 film), a science fiction film starring Joe Lando and A. J. Cook
- Bloodsuckers (2021 film), a German comedy film

== Other ==
- Bloodsuckers (1993 game), by Pangea Software
- Blood Sucker (manga), written by Saki Okuse and drawn by Aki Shimizu
- Bloodsucker, comic book character, see list of Teenage Mutant Ninja Turtles characters
- Bloodsucker, a mutant in the game S.T.A.L.K.E.R.: Shadow of Chernobyl
