= Aki Shimizu =

Japanese manga artist

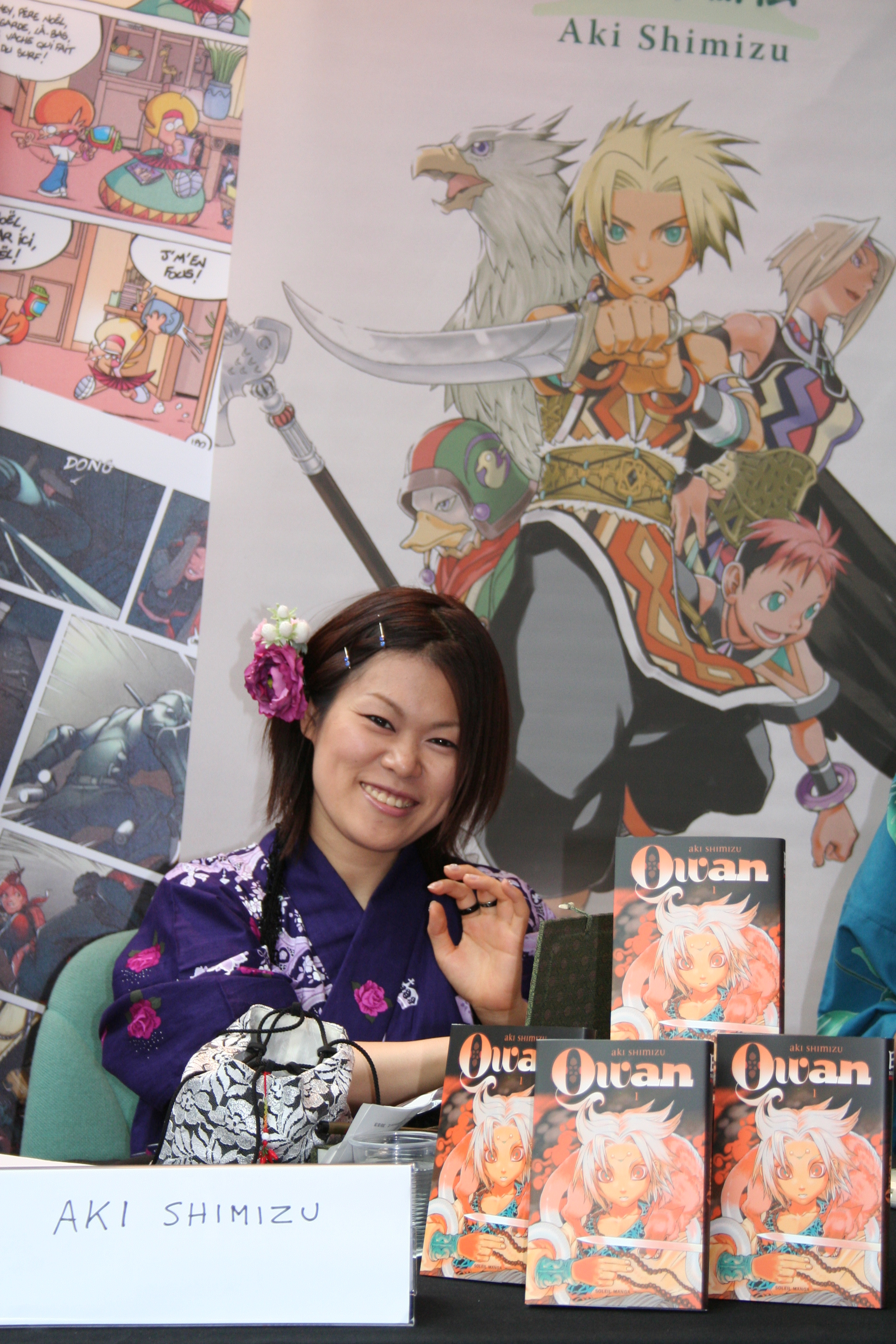
Aki Shimizu during Japan Expo 2006, Paris, July 9th, 2006.

Aki Shimizu (志水 アキ, Shimizu Aki) is a manga artist who hails from Ōmuta, Fukuoka. She contributed the art for Blood Sucker: Legend of Zipangu (2000), and Graduale der Wolken (2001). Shimizu's work includes the manga adaptation of Suikoden III (2002), based on Konami's video game, and a prequel manga to Suikoden STAR LEAP (2025), featuring Shapur, a new character and one of the 108 heroes from the Nameless Lands.

Her own original series, Qwan, was published in 2002.

== Bibliography ==
- 1995: Illustrator for PC Magazine Log In
- 1998: Package art and character designs for Windows game After Devil Force
- 1999: Character illustrations for Windows game First Queen: The New World
- 1999: Legend of Zipangu: Blood Sucker (Yato no Kamitsukai) (Twelve volumes), published in Comic Birz (Art only, written by Saki Okuse)
- 2000: Kumo no Graduale (Four volumes), published in Monthly Comic Flapper (Art only, written by Hirokatsu Kihara)
- 2001: Devil Children card game (Art only)
- 2001: Aquarian Age card game (Art only)
- 2002: Qwan (Seven volumes), published in Monthly Comic Flapper (Writer/artist)
- 2002: Suikoden III (Eleven volumes), published in Monthly Comic Flapper (Writer/artist)
- 2007: Mōryō no Hako (Five volumes), published in Comic Kwai (Art only, written by Natsuhiko Kyogoku)
- 2013: The Summer of the Ubume (Four volumes), published in Comic Kwai (Art only, written by Natsuhiko Kyogoku)
- 2019: The Mononoke Lecture Logs of Chuzenji-sensei (Thirteen volumes, ongoing), published in Shōnen Magazine Edge (2019-2023) and Comic Days (2023-present) (Writer/artist)
- 2020: Inugami Re (Four volumes), published in Line Manga (Art only, written by Masaya Hokazono)
- 2025: Suikoden STAR LEAP - Trails of the Stars
