= Tanzyn Crawford =

Australian actress

- Born: October 25, 2000 (age 26); Perth, Western Australia
- Occupation: Actress
- Years active: 2020–present

Tanzyn Crawford is an Australian and American actress.

== Early life ==
Crawford was born in Perth, Western Australia. Her mother is from Western Australia and her father is African American from Indiana.

== Career ==
Crawford's first job after graduating was in the American television series Servant. She then played main roles in Tiny Beautiful Things (2023) and Swift Street (2024).

Crawford features in the HBO series A Knight of the Seven Kingdoms (2026), playing a puppeteer named Tanselle 'Too-Tall'. Crawford discussed the casting process with online publication Vulture, saying "The character description I initially got just said 'A tall puppeteer.' That might've been it. I was like, 'Wait, I'm tall. This could work out for me.' Physically, I can relate to that" clarifying that she's "a full six feet".

In 2026, Crawford was cast in an undisclosed regular role in the upcoming live-action adaptation of the Assassin's Creed video game series.

== Personal life ==
In an interview with Australian broadcaster SBS, Crawford described herself as gay, and discussed the difficulties of pursuing acting work as a mixed race actor, saying "I was auditioning for stuff [in Australia] and I would get feedback like, 'She's just not the right look,' or 'We don't want to cast two different-race parents'."

== Filmography ==
=== Film ===
Year	Title	Role	Notes
2020	Alexander	Friend	
2025	Under The Lights	Molly	
2025	Souvenir	Keira	Short film

=== Television ===
Year	Title	Role	Notes
2023	Servant	Willow	2 episodes
2023	Tiny Beautiful Things	Rae Kincaid	Main role
2024	Swift Street	Elsie	Main role
2026	A Knight of the Seven Kingdoms	Tanselle	4 episodes
2026	Sheriff Country	Jane Yarrow	1 episode
TBA	Assassin's Creed †	TBA	Main role

Key
Clock	Denotes television productions that have not yet been released
