= Qwan =

Japanese manga series

- First tankōbon volume cover

怪·力·乱·神 クワン (Kai·Riki·Ran·Shin Kuwan)
- Genre: Fantasy; Historical
- Manga
- Written by: Aki Shimizu
- Published by: Media Factory
- English publisher: NA: Tokyopop
- Magazine: Monthly Comic Flapper
- Original run: September 5, 2002 – February 5, 2008
- Volumes: 7

Qwan (怪·力·乱·神 クワン, Kai·Riki·Ran·Shin Kuwan; literally Confused Spirit With Mysterious Powers Kuwan) is a Japanese manga series written and illustrated by Aki Shimizu. It was serialized in Media Factory's Monthly Comic Flapper magazine from September 2002 to February 2008, with its chapters collected in seven tankōbon volumes.

The series is licensed in North America by Tokyopop.

== Story ==
Qwan, a strange boy who can eat demons, travels through Eastern Han dynasty China with his winged companion Teikou, looking for the sutra known as the Essential Arts of Peace which he knows for certain will reveal who he is and what his purpose in life is. But there are other people interested in the sutra, like Yuushi, who will ambush him and try to stop him.

== Characters ==
Some characters in Qwan's story were portrayed from real figures in Chinese history. For example, Aman (aka. Cao Cao), Cao Jie, Jou Kai and Chin Ban.

=== Main characters ===
Qwan (酷王（クワン）, Kùwáng (Kuwan))
A young boy who is able to consume demons. Harbouring amazing strength and the ability to take a stick to the face, Qwan is on a quest to eat as many demons as he can, though even he doesn't know why. Qwan doesn't eat human food and gets frustrated when he gets offered to eat them. After learning of the 'Essential Arts of Peace,' Qwan begins the task of sneaking into the royal palaces of China in order to consume the sutra and discover who he really is and what he's on Earth for. The symbol that prove him to be a dog demon is on his forehead.
Qwan's true form later is revealed as dog demon with snake skinned tail. He was descended to earth in order to cleanse the earth from humans. But he lost his other half and forgot everything. The event in Golden Turtle Island has caused him to lose his power and became an ordinary human. With Ukitsu's help, he and Shaga transported back to earth. Enjoying a bit of peaceful life, Qwan later must face the Yellow Turban's threat which intend to erase his existence. When Teikou ask what wish Qwan wanted, Qwan said he wants to be a normal human, live with Daki and the bugs, laughing with friends, farming, he wants to go back to the place where he was born.
Teikou (テイコウ)
A 'cute' four-winged, six-legged demon that follows Qwan wherever he goes. He has a knack for getting into trouble and seems to enjoy ladies company, sometimes causing problems when he flies away to a pretty girl. Teikou's whereabout is unknown after he transported Qwan and Shaga to Golden Turtle Island.
Daki (ダキ)
A young princess who understands how to talk to bugs and insects, and control them with her will. The serve her as they're leige and adore her pure heart. She often has run ins with Qwan, who constantly mistakes her for a demon and tries to eat her-Once kissing her in the process. Confused by the whole circumstance involving the boy, Daki is always shy around him and threatening him-Then again, she can't be blamed. Every time she meets up with Qwan, he's on top of her ripping her clothes off, trying to constantly 'eat' her, something he can't seem to realize is impossible since she is not a demon.
After the incident with Touda at the palace, her relationship with Qwan is getting better, as Qwan became more friendly towards her. She later returned to the Bug Forest along with Seishigaku and Hakuhiko, only to discover a shocking truth. It was found out later that Daki is Qwan's another half. She also have a symbol like Qwan, but it is located on her stomach. It was last seen by Shaga's adopted son that he saw a young girl and a young boy in the forest. The girl has many butterflies around her and the boy has a tattoo on his forehead. Qwan's wish was granted.
Chikei (チケイ)
An all-around lowlife, Chickei met Qwan when the aforementioned tried selling Teikou for a profit. He joins with Qwan to get money for getting rid of demons, and at times can seem shallow, squandering money that Qwan rightfully earned, (not that Qwan would want it anyway.). Over time, Chikei learns to care for Qwan almost as a little brother.
Shaga (シャガ)
A lady of the night with a lot of knowledge. Meeting Qwan by chance, she stops the boy from consuming Lord Yuushi the first time they met, and afterwards is the one to tell Qwan about the 'Essential Arts of Peace.' There seems to be more than she knows and lets on; She appears to know all about Qwan and his destiny, but speaks nothing of it. As time goes by, she's become affectionate with Qwan, who seems to remind her of her previous child. In volume 3, it is revealed that she's also from another world just like Qwan. Despite her young looks, she actually has lived for hundred years.
Aman (阿瞞（アマン）, A-Man (Aman))
Also known as Sousou (曹操（ソウソウ）, Cao Cao (Sousou)). An intelligent, self-confident young aristocrat of Cao family who aims to become an emperor. Although he is known as the grandson of Eunuch Cao Jie, he actually didn't have any blood connection with him. He is interested in Essential Arts of Peace and helping Qwan to get it. He seems to dislike Chikei, who is only hanging around with him and Qwan just to have an easy life.
After the Golden Turtle Island event, 17 years had passed in human world. He has turning 25 years old and goes by the name "Mengde". In public, he is famously known as Captain Cao. Currently, he is fighting against the Yellow Turban Rebellion.
Yuushi (ユウシ)
Daki's foster father and utter lunatic. He treats Daki more like a tool than a daughter. Able to control bugs as his daughter can, he appears to be a sort of demon, once trying to eat Chikei's desires. Yuushi is constantly getting in Qwan's way of consuming the 'Essential Arts of Peace'. Later, it revealed that his true form is a spider demon. He took interest of Daki's power and took her from Bug Forest (by taking advantage of Touda's favor to cure Daki's illness).
Jou Kai (張闓（ジョウカイ）, Zhang Kai (Joukai))
An aristocrat who also royal fortune teller. Previously, he was Ukitsu's apprentice. He inherited and is able to use Ukitsu's "character manipulation" ability. He had mysterious connection with Yuushi.

=== Supporting characters ===
Sousetsu (曹節（ソウセツ）, Cao Jie (Sousetsu))
Aman's adopted grandfather. He forbids Aman to learn about the Essential Arts of Peace because he doesn't want him to be suspected of committing treason.
Seishigaku (セイガク)
A wasp demon who is Daki's servant. He has been taking care of Daki since she was a little girl and is very protective of her. He and his partner, Hakuhiko, tried to ambush Qwan but were defeated. Later, he told Qwan about Daki's origin.
Hakuhiko (ハクヒコ)
Seishigaku's twin partner. He has also been protecting Daki together with Hakuhiko. He got eaten by Qwan when fighting him. But later, Qwan spits him out after Touda died. Because he is still powerless, Hakuhiko remains in his bug form.
Ukitsu (于吉（ウキツ）, Yu Ji (Ukitsu))
The writer of Essential Arts of Peace. He appears to be laid back and quite a perverted man. Qwan and Shaga met with him when they got teleported to Golden Turtle island by Teikou. He mastered an ability called "Character Manipulation". He's the one who discovered Qwan when he was descended to earth and naming him.
Touda (トウダ)
A giant snake which is Daki's adopted mother. She nursed Daki when she was abandoned in the Bug Forest as a baby. Yuushi manipulated her in an attempt to get rid of Qwan by telling her that Qwan kidnapped Daki.
Ryan (リャ, Liang (Ryan))
An orphaned peasant girl. She has been living with her toddler younger brother in poverty. She was the first person who discovered Qwan and Shaga after they transported back from Golden Turtle Island. She invited them to live with her. Sadly, she later killed by one of Yellow Turban's member who were after Qwan and Shaga.
Huang Que
One of Yellow Turban's assassin that were sent to eliminate Qwan's existence. He met Ryan while searching for Qwan and killed her.

== Publication ==
Written and illustrated by Kei Toume, Qwan started serialization in Media Factory's Monthly Comic Flapper magazine on September 5, 2002. (Note: It started in the magazine's 35th issue (October issue) of 2002 (cover date October 5), released on September 5 of that same year.) The series concluded its serialization on February 5, 2008. Media Factory collected its chapters in seven tankōbon volumes, published from February 22, 2003, to March 22, 2008.

The series is licensed in North America by Tokyopop. The manga is also licensed in France by Soleil Productions, and in Taiwan by Tong Li Publishing.

=== Volumes ===
No.	Original release date	Original ISBN	English release date	English ISBN
1	February 22, 2003	978-4-84-010482-1	August 3, 2005	978-1-59532-534-1
2	August 23, 2003	978-4-84-010497-5	December 7, 2005	978-1-59532-535-8
3	May 22, 2004	978-4-84-010949-9	December 13, 2005	978-1-59532-536-5
4	February 23, 2006	978-4-84-011360-1	May 29, 2007	978-1-42780-235-4
5	February 23, 2007	978-4-84-011674-9		
6	August 23, 2007	978-4-84-011939-9		
7	March 22, 2008	978-4-84-012206-1		
