= Blood Sucker (manga) =

Japanese manga series

- Blood Sucker: Legend of Zipangu
- Cover of the first volume of Tokyopop's English-language release.

夜刀の神つかい (Yato-no-kami Tsukai)
- Genre: Horror, supernatural
- Manga
- Written by: Saki Okuse
- Illustrated by: Aki Shimizu
- Published by: Gentosha
- English publisher: AUS: Madman Entertainment; NA: Tokyopop
- Magazine: Comic Birz
- Original run: 2000 – 2007
- Volumes: 12

Blood Sucker: Legend of Zipangu (夜刀の神つかい, Yato-no-kami Tsukai) is a horror-themed Japanese manga series written by Saki Okuse (奥瀬 サキ, Okuse Saki) and illustrated by Aki Shimizu.

It is twelve volumes long and was serialized in Gentosha Comics' Comic Birz magazine, and licensed by Tokyopop in the West. The manga is rated M (Mature, Age 18+), due to its scenes of intense violence and nudity.

== Plot ==
The story follows main protagonist Yusuke Himukai, on his quest to rescue his beloved Kikuri from the vampire Migiri. With the help of Migiri's loyal servant Kuraha, Migiri has been brought back to life and has taken Kikuri as his new bride. Yusuke races to save her, and he fights Migiri, costing him his hand in the process. Two years later Yusuke is found in a mental institution.

== Reception ==
In Jason Thompson's online appendix to Manga: The Complete Guide, he describes the manga as "super-gory horror drama", but notes that the plot is a "gripping, complicated story which unpeels effortlessly". He notes that the manga artist here is departing from her usual style, but that the manga's style suits the story being told.

== See also ==
- Yato-no-kami
