= Swift Street =

Australian drama television miniseries

- Genre: Comedy; Crime
- Created by: Tig Terera
- Written by: Tig Terera; Sam Carroll; Nicole Reddy; Briar Grace-Smith
- Directed by: Tig Terera; Nicholas Verso
- Starring: Tanzyn Crawford; Cliff Curtis
- Composers: Maria Alfonsine; Damian De Boos-Smith
- Country of origin: Australia
- Original language: English
- No. of series: 1
- No. of episodes: 8

Production
- Executive producers: Lois Randall; Cliff Curtis
- Producers: Ivy Mak; Lois Randall
- Cinematography: Sherwin Akbarzadeh
- Running time: 26 minutes
- Production company: Magpie Pictures

Original release
- Network: SBS
- Release: 24 April 2024

Swift Street is an Australian drama television series broadcast by SBS in 2024. It was created by Tig Terera and stars Tanzyn Crawford and Cliff Curtis.

== Synopsis ==
Set in Melbourne's inner-city northern suburbs, it depicts 21-year-old Elsie trying to help pay back a debt her father, Robert, has with a local crime boss.

== Cast ==
- Tanzyn Crawford as Elsie Masalla
- Cliff Curtis as Robert Masalla
- Bernie Van Tiel as Aisha
- Keiynan Lonsdale as Tom
- Eliza Matengu as The Mechanic
- Daniel Wuol as Ruby
- Alfred Chuol as Tatenda
- Bolude Watson as Moreblessing Masalla

== Production ==
The series was created by Tig Terera. It was produced by Ivy Mak and Lois Randall through Magpie Pictures for SBS Television. Cinematography was by Sherwin Akbarzadeh.

Lois Randall and Cliff Curtis were executive producers.

== Broadcast ==
Swift Street aired on SBS from 24 April 2024.

== Reception ==
Writing in The Guardian, Luke Buckmaster gave it four stars, writing "In terms of its emotional essence, Swift Street is framed from the beginning as a story about a father and daughter – though it’s easy to forget that, given the show’s breakneck pacing and sheer sass. It moves, baby, and it’s an absolute blast." Wenlei Ma of The Nightly says "Swift Street wants to show that it’s not always an easy life with clear moral decisions, but it is an easy series to like."

== Awards ==
- 14th AACTA Awards
  - Best Costume Design in Television - Ntombi Moyo (Episode 1: Thank You Elsie) - nominated
