= Yutaka Nakamura =

Japanese animator

Yutaka Nakamura (中村豊, Nakamura Yutaka) (born December 22, 1967) is a Japanese animator, designer, and storyboard artist. He previously worked for animation studios Ad Cosmo and Art Office Sharaku, and is currently affiliated with Anime ToroToro. He has a desk at Bones, where he usually works from.

His works include key animation on projects such as Cowboy Bebop, Space Dandy, Fullmetal Alchemist, One Punch Man, My Hero Academia, Gachiakuta, and Eureka Seven. He is known for his dynamic and unique action sequences that often make very heavy use of impact frames, and is considered in animation circles as one of the greatest action cinematographers of his generation. Having the freedom to storyboard his own scenes, he mixes unique action cinematography and animation timing to create distinctive action scenes in his animation. He is also known for his very detailed animations of debris, often cubic in nature; this type of debris has become so synonymous with his work that they've been given the name "yutapon cubes" after his nickname "yutapon" within animation circles. His work has been discussed in an animation panel focused on Japanese animators, called: "Yutaka Nakamura: Grandmaster Fight Animator." One of his most notable animation works includes the last action scene in the movie Sword of the Stranger.

== Filmography ==
- Sakigake!! Otokojuku (1988) (key animator)
- Brave Exkaiser (1990) (key animator)
- Getter Robo Go (1991) (key animator)
- Dragon Ball Z: Cooler's Revenge (1991) (key animator)
- The Brave Fighter of Sun Fighbird (1991) (key animator)
- Tekkaman Blade (1992) (key animator)
- Tekkaman Blade II (1994) (key animator)
- Neon Genesis Evangelion (1995) (key animator)
- The Vision of Escaflowne (1996) (key animator)
- Reideen the Superior (1996) (key animator)
- Revolutionary Girl Utena (1997) (key animator)
- Generator Gawl (1998) (assistant mechanical animation director)
- Cowboy Bebop (1998) (key animator)
- Tekkaman Blade: Twin Blood (1998) (mechanical animation director, Tekkaman re-design)
- Escaflowne (2000) (key animator)
- Blood: The Last Vampire (2000) (key animator)
- Cowboy Bebop: The Movie (2001) (key animator, weapons designer)
- RahXephon (2002) (key animator)
- Overman King Gainer (2002) (key animator)
- Animatrix: A Detective Story (2003) (key animator, digital effects)
- Ghost in the Shell: Stand Alone Complex (2003) (key animator)
- Wolf's Rain (2003) (key animator)
- Fullmetal Alchemist (2004) (key animator, animation supervisor)
- Fullmetal Alchemist the Movie: Conqueror of Shamballa (2005) (key animator, action animation supervisor)
- Eureka Seven (2005) (key animator)
- Gaiking: Legend of Daiku-Maryu (2005) (key animator)
- Darker than Black (2007) (key animator)
- Sword of the Stranger (2007) (key animator, action animation supervisor)
- Soul Eater (2008) (key animator)
- Fullmetal Alchemist: Brotherhood (2009) (key animator)
- Star Driver (2010) (key animator)
- Un-Go (2011) (key animator, 2nd key animator)
- Towa no Quon (2011) (key animator)
- Eureka Seven AO (2012) (key animator)
- Space Dandy (2014) (key animator)
- Blood Blockade Battlefront (2015) (key animator)
- Concrete Revolutio (2015) (key animator)
- One-Punch Man (2015) (key animator (ep 12, under a pseudonym))
- Mob Psycho 100 (2016–2022) (key animator, 2nd key animator)
- My Hero Academia (2017–2025) (key animator, 2nd key animator)
- Blood Blockade Battlefront & Beyond (2017) (key animator)
- My Hero Academia: Two Heroes (2018) (key animator)
- My Hero Academia: Heroes Rising (2019) (key animator)
- My Hero Academia: World Heroes' Mission (2021) (key animator)
- Frieren: Beyond Journey's End (2023–2026) (key animator)
- Metallic Rouge (2024) (key animator, storyboard artist)
- My Hero Academia: You're Next (2024) (key animator, storyboard artist, animation supervisor)
- Gachiakuta (2025) (key animator, storyboard artist)
- Cosmic Princess Kaguya! (2026) (key animator)
- My Hero Academia: Vigilantes (2026) (key animator)

== Books ==
- Yutaka Nakamura Animation Key Frame Vol.1 (中村豊 アニメーション原画集 Vol.1). Style, 2019. ISBN 978-4902948288
- Yutaka Nakamura Animation Key Frame Vol.2 (中村豊 アニメーション原画集 Vol.2). Style, 2022. ISBN 978-4902948400
- Yutaka Nakamura Animation Key Frame Vol.3 (中村豊 アニメーション原画集 Vol.3). Style, 2022. ISBN 978-4902948479
