= The Mononoke Lecture Logs of Chuzenji-sensei =

Japanese manga series

- The Mononoke Lecture Logs of Chuzenji-sensei: He Just Solves All the Mysteries
- First tankōbon volume cover

中禅寺先生物怪講義録 先生が謎を解いてしまうから (Chūzenji-sensei Mononoke Kōgiroku: Sensei ga Nazo o Toite Shimaukara)
- Genre: Mystery, supernatural
- Created by: Natsuhiko Kyōgoku
- Manga
- Written by: Aki Shimizu
- Published by: Kodansha
- Imprint: Magazine Edge KC
- Magazine: Shōnen Magazine Edge (October 17, 2019 – October 17, 2023); Comic Days (December 20, 2023 – present)
- Original run: October 17, 2019 – present
- Volumes: 13
- Anime television series
- Directed by: Chihiro Kumano
- Written by: Atsushi Oka
- Music by: Keiichi Hirokawa; Ryūichi Takada
- Studio: 100studio
- Licensed by: SA/SEA: Medialink
- Original network: TV Tokyo, BS TV Tokyo, AT-X
- Original run: April 7, 2025 – June 23, 2025
- Episodes: 12

The Mononoke Lecture Logs of Chuzenji-sensei: He Just Solves All the Mysteries (Japanese: 中禅寺先生物怪講義録 先生が謎を解いてしまうから, Hepburn: Chūzenji-sensei Mononoke Kōgiroku: Sensei ga Nazo o Toite Shimaukara; lit. ' Professor Chuuzenji's Lectures on Monsters: Because the Professor Solves the Mystery') is a Japanese manga series written and illustrated by Aki Shimizu, based on the Rozen Kreuz Series novels created by Natsuhiko Kyōgoku. It began serialization in Kodansha's shōnen manga magazine Shōnen Magazine Edge in October 2019. After the magazine's discontinuation in October 2023, the series was transferred to Kodansha's Comic Days website in December that same year. An anime television series adaptation produced by 100studio aired from April to June 2025.

== Characters ==
Kanna Kusakabe (日下部 栞奈, Kusakabe Kanna)
Voiced by: Kaori Maeda
Akihiko Chuzenji (中禅寺 秋彦, Chūzenji Akihiko)
Voiced by: Katsuyuki Konishi
Reijiro Enokizu (榎木津 礼二郎, Enokizu Reijirō)
Voiced by: Shinnosuke Tachibana
Tatsumi Sekiguchi (関口 巽, Sekiguchi Tatsumi)
Voiced by: Shūya Nishiji
Shutaro Kiba (木場 修太郎, Kiba Shūtarō)
Voiced by: Takanori Hoshino
Atsuko Chuzenji (中禅寺敦子, Chūzenji Atsuko)
Voiced by: Ai Furihata
Chizuko Chuzenji (中禅寺千鶴子, Chūzenji Chizuko)
Voiced by: Ai Kayano
Yukie (雪絵)
Voiced by: Kaoru Sakura
Soichiro Enokizu (榎木津 総一郎, Enokizu Sōichirō)
Voiced by: Mitsuru Miyamoto
Shizue Minoda (蓑田静江, Minoda Shizue)
Voiced by: Saki Ogasawara
Hanayo Renjō (連城花代, Renjō Hanayo)
Voiced by: Yukiyo Fujii
Ryōko Ogawa (小川涼子, Ogawa Ryōko)
Voiced by: Hikaru Akao
Takeshi Kōda (幸田武, Kōda Takeshi) / Take-bō (タケ坊)
Voiced by: Wataru Hatano

== Media ==
=== Manga ===
Written and illustrated by Aki Shimizu, The Mononoke Lecture Logs of Chuzenji-sensei: He Just Solves All the Mysteries began serialization in Kodansha's shōnen manga magazine Shōnen Magazine Edge on October 17, 2019. After the magazine's final issue was published on October 17, 2023, the series was transferred to Kodansha's Comic Days website on December 20 that same year. The series is based on the Rozen Kreuz Series novels created by Natsuhiko Kyōgoku. Its chapters have been collected into thirteen tankōbon volumes as of June 2026.

==== Volumes ====
No.	Release date	ISBN
1	July 17, 2020	978-4-06-520247-0
2	August 17, 2020	978-4-06-520514-3
3	March 17, 2021	978-4-06-522668-1
4	July 15, 2021	978-4-06-524160-8
5	February 17, 2022	978-4-06-526848-3
6	August 17, 2022	978-4-06-528958-7
7	April 17, 2023	978-4-06-531367-1
8	October 17, 2023	978-4-06-533359-4
9	May 9, 2024	978-4-06-535576-3
10	October 8, 2024	978-4-06-537212-8
11	March 7, 2025	978-4-06-538737-5
12	October 9, 2025	978-4-06-541057-8
13	June 9, 2026	978-4-06-543124-5

=== Anime ===
An anime television series adaptation was announced on October 1, 2024. It is produced by 100studio and directed by Chihiro Kumano, with scripts written by Atsushi Oka, characters designed by Masahiko Suzuki, and music composed by Keiichi Hirokawa and Ryūichi Takada. The series aired from April 7 to June 23, 2025, on TV Tokyo and other networks. (Note: TV Tokyo lists the series premiere on April 7, 2025, at 25:30, which is effectively April 8 at 1:30 a.m. JST, though AT-X has the earliest release on April 7.) The opening theme song is "Kanojo wa Ima, Meikyuu no Naka." (彼女は今、迷宮の中。; She Is Now in the Labyrinth), performed by HoneyWorks feat. Kaf, while the ending theme song is "Kimi no Shiranai Koto" (君の知らないこと; What You Don't Know), performed by Sizuk. Medialink licensed the series in South and Southeast Asia for streaming on Ani-One Asia's YouTube channel.

==== Episodes ====
No.	Title	Directed by (Note: Production staff information is taken from the ending credits of each episode.)	Written by	Storyboarded by	Original release date
1	"The New Teacher with a Stern Face"; Transliteration: "Bucchōzura na Shin-nin Kōshi" (Japanese: 仏頂面な新任講師)	Chihiro Kumano	Atsushi Oka	Chihiro Kumano	April 7, 2025
2	"Red Paper, Blue Paper"; Transliteration: "Akai Kami・Aoi Kami" (Japanese: 赤い紙・青い紙)	Fuse Yasuyiki	Atsushi Oka	Chihiro Kumano	April 14, 2025
3	"The Man in the Blue Cloak"; Transliteration: "Ao Manto no Otoko" (Japanese: 青マントの男)	Morita Tarou	Hitotsu Matsudan	Chihiro Kumano	April 21, 2025
4	"The Midsummer God's Prank"; Transliteration: "Manatsu no Kami no Itazura" (Japanese: 真夏の神のいたずら)	Chihiro Kumano	Atsushi Oka	Keiichi Hara	April 28, 2025
5	"Doppelganger"; Transliteration: "Dopperugengā" (Japanese: ドッペルゲンガー)	Ko Seung-Cheol	Yuki Kagami	Kazuya Miura	May 5, 2025
6	"The Wicker Basket That Must Not Be Opened"; Transliteration: "Akete wa Ikenai Tsudzura" (Japanese: 開けてはいけない葛籠)	Kiyoshi Murayama	Hitotsu Matsudan	Jutaro Sekino	May 12, 2025
7	"A Monster Cat is Here"; Transliteration: "Bake Neko no Raihō" (Japanese: 化け猫の来訪)	Takeyuki Sadohara	Atsushi Oka	Keiichi Hara	May 19, 2025
8	"Grim Reaper's Score"; Transliteration: "Sinigami no Gakuhu" (Japanese: 死神の楽譜)	Kazuki Yokoyama, Kai Kimura	Hitotsu Matsudan	Kazuki Yokoyama	May 26, 2025
9	"Rumor of the Haunted House"; Transliteration: "Yūrei Yashiki no Uwasa" (Japanese: 幽霊屋敷の噂)	Rintaro Kitabayashi, Kai Kimura	Hitotsu Matsudan	Chihiro Kumano	June 2, 2025
10	"The Pranks of the Brownie"; Transliteration: "Buraunī no Itazura" (Japanese: ブラウニーのいたずら)	Fuse Yasuyuki	Yuki Kagami	Hiroshi Hara	June 9, 2025
10	"Salome's Head"; Transliteration: "Sarome no Kubi" (Japanese: サロメの首)	Fuse Yasuyuki	Yuki Kagami	Hiroshi Hara	June 9, 2025
11	"The Girl Enjoys Delicacies in Autumn"; Transliteration: "Aki Takaku Otome Hōbaru" (Japanese: 秋高く乙女頬張る)	Kai Hasako	Atsushi Oka	Keiichi Hara	June 16, 2025
12	"Paranormal Detective Kanna"; Transliteration: "Shinrei Tantei Kanna" (Japanese: 心霊探偵 栞奈)	Chihiro Kumano	Atsushi Oka	Chihiro Kumano	June 23, 2025

== See also ==
- The Summer of the Ubume, the first novel in the Kyōgokudō novel series
- Mōryō no Hako, the second novel in the Kyōgokudō novel series
