= Assassin's Creed (TV series) =

Upcoming television series

- Genre: Action-adventure; Historical drama
- Created by: Roberto Patino; David Wiener
- Based on: Assassin's Creed by Ubisoft
- Showrunners: Roberto Patino; David Wiener
- Starring: Toby Wallace; Lola Petticrew; Zachary Hart; Laura Marcus; Tanzyn Crawford; Claes Bang; Nabhaan Rizwan
- Country of origin: United States
- Original language: English

Production
- Executive producers: Roberto Patino; David Wiener; Gerard Guillemot; Margaret Boykin; Austin Dill; Matt O'Toole
- Producer: Genevieve Jones
- Production locations: Rome; Bulgaria
- Production company: Ubisoft Film & Television

Original release
- Network: Netflix

Assassin's Creed is an upcoming American historical action-adventure television series based on the video game franchise published by Ubisoft. It was produced for Netflix by Ubisoft Film & Television, with Roberto Patino and David Wiener serving as co-showrunners and executive producers. The series presents an original story expanding on the universe established in the games, which centers on the centuries-long conflict between Assassins and Templars. It is set in Ancient Rome in 64 AD, a turbulent period marked by the Great Fire of Rome and the reign of Nero.

== Cast ==
=== Main ===
- Toby Wallace
- Lola Petticrew
- Zachary Hart
- Laura Marcus
- Tanzyn Crawford
- Claes Bang
- Nabhaan Rizwan

=== Recurring ===
- Noomi Rapace
- Ramzy Bedia
- Corrado Invernizzi
- Sean Harris
- Sandra Guldberg Kamp
- Youssef Kerkour
- Mirren Mack
- Louis McCartney

== Production ==
=== Development ===
In October 2020, Ubisoft and Netflix entered a content deal to produce multiple adaptations of the Assassin's Creed franchise, including a live-action series, an animated series, and an anime series. Jeb Stuart was initially attached to write the live-action series, but by January 2023, he had departed the project. In July 2025, Netflix greenlit the series with Patino and Wiener set as creators and showrunners. The series was produced by Ubisoft Film & Television, with executive producers including Gerard Guillemot, Margaret Boykin, Jason Altman, and Danielle Kreinik. Johan Renck had been hired to direct episodes of the series.

=== Casting ===
In November and December 2025, Toby Wallace, Lola Petticrew, Zachary Hart, and Laura Marcus were cast as series regulars. In January 2026, Tanzyn Crawford joined the cast as a series regular. In March 2026, Noomi Rapace, Ramzy Bedia, Sean Harris and Corrado Invernizzi joined the cast in recurring roles while Claes Bang and Nabhaan Rizwan were cast as series regulars. Later that month, Sandra Guldberg Kamp, Youssef Kerkour, Mirren Mack and Louis McCartney were also added to the cast, while confirming filming to have begun and the time period of the series.

=== Filming ===
Principal photography began on March 10, 2026, in Italy, the setting for the series. Filming primarily took place at Cinecittà Studios in Rome, and was expected to last seven months, wrapping in mid-October. Filming also took place in Bulgaria.
