= Yato-no-kami =

Snake deities in Japanese folklore

The Yato-no-kami (夜刀の神; "gods of the night-sword") are snake deities in Japanese folklore appearing in the Hitachi no Kuni Fudoki.

== Properties of the gods ==
They lived in Namegata county, in fields near the government office. As a snake, it was an araburu-kami (荒ぶる神; "rough, aggressive kami") which are fierce kami who represent the ferocious side of nature, such as raging rivers and fierce storms - as well as natural disasters. While such things do bring suffering to people, a properly enshrined and worshipped Araburu Kami would also protect the people from these calamities. Yato no kami were rumored to bring familial extermination on anyone who saw them.

== Legends ==
It's told that Yato no Kami were killed and enshrined by a man named Yahazu no uji no Matachi during the time when Emperor Keitai was in reign. The Yato no kami vanished later when a man named Mibunomuroji Maro drove them away from disturbing him and his workers who were building a moat there.
