= Paralysed Age =

German gothic rock band

Paralysed Age are a German gothic rock and darkwave band formed in Hamburg. Its initial lineup consisted of Marco Neumann, Stefan Kirsch, and Michael Knust; and, while it officially coalesced around that trio in 1991, its earliest demo recordings were produced in 1989.

Since 1998, the band has consisted of Michael Knust and Andrea Knust.

The band's latest album was released in 2026, marking 37 years of musical output.

== Discography ==
- 1991: The Last Procession
- 1991: Candledance
- 1992: Christened Child
- 1993: Exile
- 1994: Nocturne
- 1994: Bloodsucker (EP)
- 1999: Empire of the Vampire (compilation)
- 2001: Into the Ice
- 2006: Tragedia Nosferata
- 2019: Intermezzo
- 2026: La Casa Che Soy
