= Line Manga =

Manga and webtoon platform

- Website type: Digital manga, webtoon platform
- Available in: Japanese
- Owner: Webtoon Entertainment
- Website: manga.line.me Official website
- Commercial: Yes
- Registration: Optional
- Launched: 2013
- Current status: Active

Line Manga (LINEマンガ) is a digital manga and webtoons distribution platform launched in 2013 by Line Corporation and operated by Line Digital Frontier since 2018. The service initially offered only licensed manga. In 2019, it merged with XOY, a free webtoon platform operated by Naver Webtoon Corporation in Japan. Following the integration, Japanese-translated versions of webtoons from Webtoon began to be featured on the platform under the label Line Manga Webtoon, making Line Manga the Japanese counterpart to Webtoon.

== Overview ==
Line first launched its manga service in 2013 offering licensed manga titles to purchase. One of the biggest features of the service was its integration with the Line messaging app, users could recommend and share manga titles with friends in the app, collect special stickers that were exclusive to titles bought on the service, and use Line's digital currency to buy titles. In 2017, Line Manga introduced the ability to read some manga chapters for free similar to the webtoon model it had used with its Naver Webtoon service. Naver, Line's Korean owner, in 2018 decided it would close down its Japanese service of Naver Webtoon (known as XOY in Japan) and merge it with Line Manga bringing with it not just its translated webtoons but also its domestic Japanese webtoons to the service. Since its launch, it has grown to be the second most popular manga app in Japan behind Piccoma and has reached over 23 million downloads since its inception.

== Line Digital Frontier ==
Line Digital Frontier Corporation
- Native name: LINE Digital Frontier株式会社
- Type: Subsidiary
- Founded: July 2, 2018; 8 years ago
- Headquarters: Midtown Tower, 9-7-1, Akasaka, Minato, Tokyo, Japan
- Key people: Masamine Takahashi (CEO)
- Services: Line Manga
- Owner: Webtoon Entertainment (70%); Naver Webtoon (30%)

Line Digital Frontier Corporation (LINE Digital Frontier株式会社) is a Japanese digital comic service provider owned by Webtoon Entertainment.

Line Digital Frontier was established in July 2018 as a joint venture between Line Corporation (70%) and Korean Naver Webtoon Corporation (30%), following a capital and business alliance in June 2018. LDF inherited Line Manga and Line comics businesses.

In January 2019, Line Manga integrated with XOY, a free webtoon platform previously operated by Naver Webtoon Corporation in Japan, resulting in the free distribution of Naver Webtoon's original works as Line Manga originals.

On August 3, 2020, Line transferred its entire stake in LDF to Webtoon Entertainment, the parent company of Naver Webtoon Corporation. Consequently, LDF became wholly owned by Webtoon Entertainment (partially via a subsidiary). Line used the proceeds from the transfer to acquire a 33.4% stake in Webtoon Entertainment.

== See also ==
- Naver Webtoon
- Piccoma
